= 1938 Philadelphia Phillies season =

1938 Philadelphia Phillies
- League: National League
- Ballpark: National League Park (April-June 1938), Shibe Park (June 1938-September 1938)
- City: Philadelphia
- Owners: Gerald Nugent
- Managers: Jimmie Wilson
- Radio: WCAU (Bill Dyer)

The 1938 Philadelphia Phillies season was a season in American baseball. The team finished in eighth place – last in an eight-team National League – with a record of 45–105, 43 games behind the first-place Chicago Cubs and 24.5 games behind the seventh-place Brooklyn Dodgers. It was the first of five straight seasons in which the Phillies finished in last place. The Phillies wore blue and yellow on their uniforms in honor of the Tercentenary of New Sweden.

== Offseason ==
- December 8, 1937: Earl Grace was traded by the Phillies to the St. Louis Browns for Cap Clark.

== Regular season ==
The Phillies moved from their old home park, National League Park, to Shibe Park midway through the season. Phillies president Gerald Nugent was eager to cut expenses and he cited the move as an opportunity for the Phillies to cut expenses by sharing stadium upkeep with the Philadelphia Athletics.

=== Season standings ===
National League
Team	W	L	Pct.	GB	Home	Road
Chicago Cubs	89	63	.586	—	44‍–‍33	45‍–‍30
Pittsburgh Pirates	86	64	.573	2	44‍–‍33	42‍–‍31
New York Giants	83	67	.553	5	43‍–‍30	40‍–‍37
Cincinnati Reds	82	68	.547	6	43‍–‍34	39‍–‍34
Boston Bees	77	75	.507	12	45‍–‍30	32‍–‍45
St. Louis Cardinals	71	80	.470	17½	36‍–‍41	35‍–‍39
Brooklyn Dodgers	69	80	.463	18½	31‍–‍41	38‍–‍39
Philadelphia Phillies	45	105	.300	43	26‍–‍48	19‍–‍57

=== Record vs. opponents ===
1938 National League record Sources:
Team	BSN	BRO	CHC	CIN	NYG	PHI	PIT	STL
Boston	—	10–12	12–10	11–9	8–14	14–8	9–13	13–9–1
Brooklyn	10–12	—	9–11–1	9–13	8–14	15–7	9–11	9–12–1
Chicago	12–10	11–9–1	—	11–11	12–10	18–4	12–10	13–9–1
Cincinnati	9–11	13–9	11–11	—	12–9	14–7	10–12	13–9–1
New York	14–8	14–8	10–12	9–12	—	16–5	9–13–1	11–9–1
Philadelphia	8–14	7–15	4–18	7–14	5–16	—	8–12–1	6–16
Pittsburgh	13–9	11–9	10–12	12–10	13–9–1	12–8–1	—	15–7
St. Louis	9–13–1	12–9–1	9–13–1	9–13–1	9–11–1	16–6	7–15	—

=== Game log ===
Legend
	Phillies win
	Phillies loss
	Phillies tie
	Postponement
**Bold**	Phillies team member

1938 Game Log
Overall Record: 45–105–1
April (1–10)

#	Date	Opponent	Score	Win	Loss	Save	Attendance	Record
1	April 19	Dodgers	5–12	Luke Hamlin (1–0)	**Wayne LaMaster** (0–1)	None	10,000	0–1
2	April 20	Dodgers	6–5	**Bucky Walters** (1–0)	Max Butcher (0–1)	None	2,000	1–1
3	April 21	Dodgers	0–9	Tot Pressnell (1–0)	**Hugh Mulcahy** (0–1)	None	2,000	1–2
–	April 22	@ Bees	Postponed (rain); Makeup: July 1 as a traditional double-header					
4	April 23	@ Bees	1–3	Lou Fette (1–0)	**Bill Hallahan** (0–1)	None	10,180	1–3
5	April 24	@ Bees	0–2	Danny MacFayden (1–1)	**Bucky Walters** (1–1)	None	11,216	1–4
–	April 25	@ Giants	Postponed (rain and inclement weather); Makeup: April 27 as a traditional double-header					
6	April 26	@ Giants	8–12	Dick Coffman (1–0)	**Wayne LaMaster** (0–2)	None	5,871	1–5
7	April 27 (1)	@ Giants	3–7	Harry Gumbert (2–0)	**Hugh Mulcahy** (0–2)	None	see 2nd game	1–6
8	April 27 (2)	@ Giants	6–11	Cliff Melton (3–0)	**Syl Johnson** (0–1)	None	21,829	1–7
9	April 28	@ Dodgers	3–6	Luke Hamlin (2–1)	**Bucky Walters** (1–2)	Max Butcher (1)	6,745	1–8
10	April 29	@ Dodgers	4–5 (12)	Tot Pressnell (2–1)	**Bill Hallahan** (0–2)	None	5,123	1–9
11	April 30	Bees	11–16	Johnny Niggeling (1–0)	**Tommy Reis** (0–1)	Ira Hutchinson (1)	2,500	1–10

May (10–11)

#	Date	Opponent	Score	Win	Loss	Save	Attendance	Record
12	May 1	Bees	5–1	**Hugh Mulcahy** (1–2)	Jim Turner (2–1)	None	5,000	2–10
13	May 3	@ Cubs	2–5	Dizzy Dean (3–0)	**Bucky Walters** (1–3)	Charlie Root (2)	8,327	2–11
14	May 4	@ Cubs	6–4	**Claude Passeau** (1–0)	Larry French (1–2)	**Al Smith** (1)	5,048	3–11
15	May 5	@ Cubs	2–21	Al Epperly (1–0)	**Wayne LaMaster** (0–3)	None	1,314	3–12
16	May 6	@ Cardinals	3–4	Curt Davis (1–1)	**Hugh Mulcahy** (1–3)	None	1,858	3–13
–	May 7	@ Cardinals	Postponed (rain); Makeup: July 17 as a traditional double-header					
17	May 8	@ Reds	2–0	**Bucky Walters** (2–3)	Johnny Vander Meer (1–2)	None	11,116	4–13
18	May 9	@ Reds	4–9	Peaches Davis (2–3)	**Claude Passeau** (1–1)	None	540	4–14
19	May 10	@ Reds	3–7	Joe Cascarella (2–0)	**Hugh Mulcahy** (1–4)	None	947	4–15
–	May 11	@ Pirates	Postponed (cold and rain); Makeup: June 12 as a traditional double-header					
–	May 12	@ Pirates	Postponed (cold and rain); Makeup: July 20 as a traditional double-header					
–	May 14	Giants	Postponed (rain); Makeup: June 29 as a traditional double-header					
–	May 15	Giants	Postponed (rain); Makeup: August 13 as a traditional double-header					
20	May 16	Giants	12–3	**Bucky Walters** (3–3)	Hal Schumacher (2–2)	None	1,500	5–15
21	May 17	Reds	1–13	Paul Derringer (5–2)	**Claude Passeau** (1–2)	None	1,500	5–16
–	May 18	Reds	Postponed (rain); Makeup: June 26 as a traditional double-header					
22	May 19	Reds	5–4	**Hugh Mulcahy** (2–4)	Joe Cascarella (2–1)	None	1,000	6–16
23	May 20	Cubs	7–16	Tex Carleton (4–2)	**Bucky Walters** (3–4)	Jack Russell (2)	2,964	6–17
24	May 21	Cubs	1–10	Larry French (2–4)	**Claude Passeau** (1–3)	None	5,000	6–18
25	May 22	Cardinals	2–1	**Pete Sivess** (1–0)	Bill McGee (2–1)	None	5,000	7–18
26	May 23	Cardinals	7–6	**Hugh Mulcahy** (3–4)	Mike Ryba (0–1)	None	1,000	8–18
–	May 24	Pirates	Postponed (rain and wet grounds); Makeup: June 19 as a traditional double-header					
27	May 25	Pirates	2–1	**Bucky Walters** (4–4)	Jim Tobin (3–3)	None	1,000	9–18
–	May 26	Pirates	Postponed (rain); Makeup: September 18 as a traditional double-header					
–	May 27	@ Giants	Postponed (rain and wet grounds); Makeup: May 28 as a traditional double-header					
28	May 28 (1)	@ Giants	4–5	Cliff Melton (7–1)	**Hugh Mulcahy** (3–5)	Dick Coffman (5)	see 2nd game	9–19
29	May 28 (2)	@ Giants	0–11	Carl Hubbell (6–1)	**Pete Sivess** (1–1)	None	26,476	9–20
30	May 29	@ Giants	6–7	Harry Gumbert (4–3)	**Bucky Walters** (4–5)	Jumbo Brown (1)	14,889	9–21
31	May 30 (1)	@ Dodgers	9–5	**Claude Passeau** (2–3)	Vito Tamulis (0–4)	None	see 2nd game	10–21
32	May 30 (2)	@ Dodgers	7–4	**Wayne LaMaster** (1–3)	Van Mungo (2–5)	**Pete Sivess** (1)	18,500	11–21

June (5–20)

#	Date	Opponent	Score	Win	Loss	Save	Attendance	Record
33	June 1	@ Cardinals	4–9	Ray Harrell (2–1)	**Hugh Mulcahy** (3–6)	None	1,471	11–22
34	June 2	@ Cardinals	5–12	Roy Henshaw (1–0)	**Bucky Walters** (4–6)	None	1,635	11–23
35	June 3	@ Cardinals	7–8 (11)	Max Macon (1–4)	**Al Smith** (0–1)	None	1,456	11–24
36	June 4	@ Cubs	1–5	Larry French (4–5)	**Claude Passeau** (2–4)	None	8,505	11–25
37	June 5	@ Cubs	1–7	Tex Carleton (6–3)	**Hugh Mulcahy** (3–7)	None	17,311	11–26
38	June 6	@ Cubs	8–10	Charlie Root (3–1)	**Bucky Walters** (4–7)	Bob Logan (2)	2,906	11–27
–	June 7	@ Reds	Postponed (rain); Makeup: July 22 as a traditional double-header					
39	June 8	@ Reds	5–7	Paul Derringer (8–4)	**Claude Passeau** (2–5)	None	14,898	11–28
40	June 10	@ Pirates	3–2	**Hugh Mulcahy** (4–7)	Russ Bauers (1–4)	None	1,034	12–28
41	June 11	@ Pirates	3–4	Bill Swift (3–2)	**Bucky Walters** (4–8)	None	3,811	12–29
42	June 12 (1)	@ Pirates	5–11	Mace Brown (8–2)	**Claude Passeau** (2–6)	None	4,826	12–30
–	June 12 (2)	@ Pirates	Postponed (rain and Sunday curfew^{^{[a]}}); Makeup: August 25 as a traditional double-header					
43	June 14	Cardinals	3–4	Curt Davis (6–2)	**Hugh Mulcahy** (4–8)	None	1,000	12–31
44	June 15	Cardinals	7–9	Mike Ryba (1–1)	**Syl Johnson** (0–2)	Clyde Shoun (1)	1,500	12–32
45	June 16	Cardinals	3–2	**Claude Passeau** (3–6)	Bill McGee (2–5)	None	975	13–32
46	June 17	Pirates	3–4 (10)	Mace Brown (9–2)	**Al Hollingsworth** (2–3)	None	4,000	13–33
47	June 18	Pirates	5–3	**Hugh Mulcahy** (5–8)	Russ Bauers (1–6)	**Claude Passeau** (1)	3,000	14–33
48	June 19 (1)	Pirates	4–14	Jim Tobin (5–3)	**Pete Sivess** (1–2)	None	see 2nd game	14–34
49	June 19 (2)	Pirates	3–16	Cy Blanton (2–1)	**Wayne LaMaster** (1–4)	None	10,000	14–35
50	June 21	Cubs	3–4	Al Epperly (2–0)	**Claude Passeau** (3–7)	Charlie Root (4)	1,200	14–36
–	June 22	Cubs	Postponed (rain); Makeup: July 31 as a traditional double-header					
–	June 23	Cubs	Postponed (rain); Makeup: September 20 as a traditional double-header					
51	June 24	Reds	4–6	Peaches Davis (4–3)	**Al Hollingsworth** (2–4)	Joe Cascarella (3)	5,000	14–37
52	June 25	Reds	7–6 (12)	**Al Hollingsworth** (3–4)	Joe Cascarella (3–4)	None	2,500	15–37
53	June 26 (1)	Reds	10–3	**Claude Passeau** (4–7)	Jim Weaver (4–3)	None	see 2nd game	16–37
54	June 26 (2)	Reds	5–8	Paul Derringer (10–5)	**Wayne LaMaster** (1–5)	None	8,520	16–38
–	June 28	Giants	Postponed (rain); Makeup: August 14 as a traditional double-header					
55	June 29 (1)	Giants	1–9	Hal Schumacher (7–5)	**Al Hollingsworth** (3–5)	None	see 2nd game	16–39
56	June 29 (2)	Giants	2–6	Cliff Melton (8–5)	**Hugh Mulcahy** (5–9)	None	8,000	16–40
57	June 30	Giants	1–14^{^{[b]}}	Slick Castleman (3–2)	**Claude Passeau** (4–8)	None	1,500	16–41

July (13–19)

#	Date	Opponent	Score	Win	Loss	Save	Attendance	Record
58	July 1 (1)	@ Bees	4–1	**Claude Passeau** (5–8)	Bobby Reis (0–1)	None	see 2nd game	17–41
59	July 1 (2)	@ Bees	5–0	**Wayne LaMaster** (2–5)	Dick Errickson (0–4)	None	2,313	18–41
60	July 2	@ Bees	1–2	Ira Hutchinson (4–4)	**Syl Johnson** (0–3)	None	7,252	18–42
61	July 3 (1)^{^{[c]}}	@ Dodgers	1–3	Vito Tamulis (2–6)	**Al Hollingsworth** (3–6)	None	see 2nd game	18–43
62	July 3 (2)^{^{[c]}}	@ Dodgers	0–2	Bill Posedel (4–4)	**Bill Hallahan** (0–3)	None	10,157	18–44
63	July 4 (1)	Bees	5–10	Bobby Reis (1–1)	**Hugh Mulcahy** (5–10)	None	see 2nd game	18–45
64	July 4 (2)	Bees	10–2	**Claude Passeau** (6–8)	Dick Errickson (0–5)	None	12,000	19–45
–	July 6	**1938 Major League Baseball All-Star Game at Crosley Field in Cincinnati**						
65	July 8	Dodgers	2–13	Vito Tamulis (3–6)	**Hugh Mulcahy** (5–11)	None	2,500	19–46
66	July 9	Dodgers	4–3 (16)	**Claude Passeau** (7–8)	Luke Hamlin (4–6)	None	1,277	20–46
67	July 10 (1)^{^{[d]}}	Dodgers	3–6	Tot Pressnell (7–7)	**Al Hollingsworth** (3–7)	Vito Tamulis (2)	see 2nd game	20–47
68	July 10 (2)^{^{[d]}}	Dodgers	5–3	**Wayne LaMaster** (3–5)	Max Butcher (4–4)	**Pete Sivess** (2)	4,949	21–47
–	July 13	@ Cubs	Postponed (wet grounds and rain); Makeup: July 14 as a traditional double-header					
69	July 14 (1)	@ Cubs	0–3	Clay Bryant (7–7)	**Claude Passeau** (7–9)	None	10,000	21–48
70	July 14 (2)	@ Cubs	1–5	Bill Lee (10–5)	**Hugh Mulcahy** (5–12)	None	9,581	21–49
71	July 15	@ Cubs	1–4	Larry French (6–12)	**Wayne LaMaster** (3–6)	None	5,581	21–50
72	July 16	@ Cardinals	2–1	**Al Hollingsworth** (4–7)	Lon Warneke (6–4)	None	1,781	22–50
–	July 17 (1)	@ Cardinals	Postponed (rain); Makeup: August 30 as a traditional double-header					
–	July 17 (2)	@ Cardinals	Postponed (rain); Makeup: August 31 as a traditional double-header					
73	July 18	@ Cardinals	3–5	Curt Davis (8–2)	**Claude Passeau** (7–10)	Max Macon (2)	95	22–51
74	July 19	@ Pirates	0–8	Ed Brandt (2–2)	**Hugh Mulcahy** (5–13)	None	2,472	22–52
75	July 20 (1)	@ Pirates	11–0	**Al Hollingsworth** (5–7)	Bob Klinger (8–2)	None	see 2nd game	23–52
76	July 20 (2)	@ Pirates	1–4	Russ Bauers (5–7)	**Pete Sivess** (1–3)	None	6,000	23–53
77	July 21	@ Pirates	4–5	Mace Brown (13–3)	**Al Smith** (0–2)	None	10,535	23–54
78	July 22 (1)	@ Reds	2–5	Paul Derringer (12–7)	**Claude Passeau** (7–11)	None	see 2nd game	23–55
79	July 22 (2)	@ Reds	11–10	**Wayne LaMaster** (4–6)	Peaches Davis (5–6)	**Hugh Mulcahy** (1)	5,419	24–55
80	July 23	@ Reds	9–10	Gene Schott (3–2)	**Bill Hallahan** (0–4)	None	3,619	24–56
81	July 24 (1)^{^{[e]}}	@ Reds	5–7	Whitey Moore (2–0)	**Al Hollingsworth** (5–8)	Paul Derringer (1)	see 2nd game	24–57
82	July 24 (2)^{^{[e]}}	@ Reds	5–1	**Syl Johnson** (1–3)	Johnny Vander Meer (11–6)	None	26,630	25–57
83	July 26	Pirates	6–5	**Pete Sivess** (2–3)	Mace Brown (13–4)	None	1,500	26–57
84	July 27	Pirates	2–4	Russ Bauers (6–8)	**Bill Hallahan** (0–5)	None	1,000	26–58
85	July 28	Pirates	2–9	Jim Tobin (9–4)	**Al Hollingsworth** (5–9)	None	2,000	26–59
86	July 29	Cubs	5–4 (12)	**Pete Sivess** (3–3)	Larry French (7–14)	None	3,000	27–59
87	July 30	Cubs	5–4	**Claude Passeau** (8–11)	Larry French (7–15)	None	1,931	28–59
88	July 31 (1)	Cubs	6–5 (12)	**Syl Johnson** (2–3)	Bill Lee (13–6)	None	see 2nd game	29–59
89	July 31 (2)	Cubs	3–4 (7)^{^{[f]}}	Charlie Root (4–2)	**Hugh Mulcahy** (5–14)	None	15,000	29–60

August (9–21)

#	Date	Opponent	Score	Win	Loss	Save	Attendance	Record
90	August 2	Reds	2–3	Johnny Vander Meer (12–6)	**Wayne LaMaster** (4–7)	Paul Derringer (2)	2,000	29–61
91	August 3	Reds	3–6 (10)	Whitey Moore (3–0)	**Claude Passeau** (8–12)	None	1,845	29–62
–	August 4	Reds	Postponed (rain); Makeup: September 16 as a traditional double-header					
92	August 5	Cardinals	0–3	Lon Warneke (9–5)	**Hugh Mulcahy** (5–15)	None	1,246	29–63
93	August 6	Cardinals	6–7	Bob Weiland (11–8)	**Al Hollingsworth** (5–10)	Curt Davis (2)	1,000	29–64
94	August 7 (1)^{^{[g]}}	Cardinals	6–3	**Claude Passeau** (9–12)	Clyde Shoun (2–5)	None	see 2nd game	30–64
95	August 7 (2)^{^{[g]}}	Cardinals	1–5 (7)	Bill McGee (4–9)	**Bill Hallahan** (0–6)	None	3,500	30–65
96	August 9	@ Dodgers	6–9	Tot Pressnell (10–11)	**Syl Johnson** (2–4)	Luke Hamlin (5)	3,268	30–66
97	August 12	Giants	0–1	Harry Gumbert (10–9)	**Al Hollingsworth** (5–11)	None	5,000	30–67
98	August 13 (1)	Giants	1–11	Carl Hubbell (13–9)	**Claude Passeau** (9–13)	None	see 2nd game	30–68
99	August 13 (2)	Giants	4–2	**Max Butcher** (6–4)	Cliff Melton (9–11)	None	10,000	31–68
100	August 14 (1)	Giants	0–11	Hal Schumacher (10–7)	**Hugh Mulcahy** (5–16)	Jumbo Brown (2)	see 2nd game	31–69
101	August 14 (2)	Giants	6–14	Bill Lohrman (7–1)	**Pete Sivess** (3–4)	Dick Coffman (12)	12,000	31–70
102	August 15	Bees	3–5	Dick Errickson (4–5)	**Syl Johnson** (2–5)	None	700	31–71
103	August 16	Bees	7–6 (11)	**Hugh Mulcahy** (6–16)	Milt Shoffner (5–5)	None	1,000	32–71
104	August 17	Bees	0–3 (8)	Ira Hutchinson (5–7)	**Max Butcher** (6–5)	None	1,000	32–72
–	August 18	Bees	Postponed (wet grounds and rain); Makeup: September 11 as a traditional double-header					
105	August 19	@ Giants	2–4	Bill Lohrman (8–1)	**Bill Hallahan** (0–7)	None	10,967	32–73
106	August 20	@ Giants	8–7	**Al Hollingsworth** (6–11)	Jumbo Brown (3–3)	None	6,771	33–73
107	August 21	@ Giants	8–3	**Max Butcher** (7–5)	Cliff Melton (10–12)	None	8,970	34–73
108	August 23	@ Reds	0–3	Whitey Moore (5–1)	**Al Hollingsworth** (6–12)	None	3,010	34–74
109	August 24	@ Reds	1–3	Lee Grissom (2–3)	**Hugh Mulcahy** (6–17)	Jim Weaver (1)	4,156	34–75
110	August 25 (1)	@ Pirates	2–1	**Max Butcher** (8–5)	Cy Blanton (10–4)	None	see 2nd game	35–75
111	August 25 (2)	@ Pirates	2–1 (11)	**Bill Hallahan** (1–7)	Red Lucas (4–3)	None	3,093	36–75
112	August 26	@ Pirates	6–4	**Al Smith** (1–2)	Jim Tobin (11–7)	**Pete Sivess** (3)	3,294	37–75
113	August 27	@ Pirates	1–6	Ed Brandt (5–2)	**Al Hollingsworth** (6–13)	None	5,889	37–76
114	August 28 (1)^{^{[h]}}	@ Cubs	5–6 (11)	Clay Bryant (13–10)	**Pete Sivess** (3–5)	None	see 2nd game	37–77
115	August 28 (2)^{^{[h]}}	@ Cubs	1–3	Vance Page (3–2)	**Syl Johnson** (2–6)	None	26,348	37–78
116	August 30 (1)	@ Cardinals	4–3	**Max Butcher** (9–5)	Max Macon (2–9)	None	see 2nd game	38–78
117	August 30 (2)	@ Cardinals	7–8 (10)	Clyde Shoun (4–5)	**Al Smith** (1–3)	None	2,679	38–79
118	August 31 (1)	@ Cardinals	1–2 (10)	Clyde Shoun (5–5)	**Claude Passeau** (9–14)	None	see 2nd game	38–80
119	August 31 (2)	@ Cardinals	6–7	Lon Warneke (13–5)	**Al Hollingsworth** (6–14)	None	2,449	38–81

September (7–22–1)

#	Date	Opponent	Score	Win	Loss	Save	Attendance	Record
120	September 1	@ Cardinals	5–6	Curt Davis (11–7)	**Al Smith** (1–4)	None	1,134	38–82
121	September 3	@ Bees	0–1	Danny MacFayden (12–6)	**Max Butcher** (9–6)	None	5,276	38–83
122	September 4 (1)	@ Bees	4–2	**Hugh Mulcahy** (7–17)	Jim Turner (12–15)	None	see 2nd game	39–83
123	September 4 (2)	@ Bees	2–6	Dick Errickson (7–6)	**Syl Johnson** (2–7)	None	14,867	39–84
124	September 5 (1)	Giants	0–7	Cliff Melton (11–13)	**Claude Passeau** (9–15)	None	see 2nd game	39–85
125	September 5 (2)	Giants	4–3	**Al Hollingsworth** (7–14)	Bill Lohrman (8–4)	None	10,000	40–85
126	September 6	Dodgers	4–6	Vito Tamulis (9–9)	**Bill Hallahan** (1–8)	None	500	40–86
127	September 7	Dodgers	6–3	**Hugh Mulcahy** (8–17)	Tot Pressnell (11–14)	None	500	41–86
128	September 8	@ Dodgers^{^{[i]}}	0–5	Luke Hamlin (10–12)	**Max Butcher** (9–7)	None	11,908	41–87
129	September 9	Bees	4–2	**Claude Passeau** (10–15)	Lou Fette (11–10)	None	1,000	42–87
130	September 10	Bees	5–6	Johnny Lanning (8–7)	**Al Hollingsworth** (7–15)	None	1,000	42–88
131	September 11 (1)	Bees	11–2	**Hugh Mulcahy** (9–17)	Danny MacFayden (12–8)	None	see 2nd game	43–88
132	September 11 (2)	Bees	2–3	Ira Hutchinson (7–8)	**Max Butcher** (9–8)	Dick Errickson (6)	2,500	43–89
–	September 13	Cardinals	Postponed (rain and wet grounds); Makeup: September 14 as a traditional double-header					
133	September 14 (1)	Cardinals	9–12	Max Macon (4–11)	**Claude Passeau** (10–16)	None	see 2nd game	43–90
134	September 14 (2)	Cardinals	2–3	Mort Cooper (1–0)	**Al Hollingsworth** (7–16)	None	1,000	43–91
135	September 16 (1)	Reds	0–2	Paul Derringer (20–12)	**Max Butcher** (9–9)	None	see 2nd game	43–92
136	September 16 (2)	Reds	2–1	**Hugh Mulcahy** (10–17)	Whitey Moore (6–3)	None	3,000	44–92
–	September 17	Reds	Canceled (rain); No makeup scheduled					
137	September 18 (1)	Pirates	0–1	Russ Bauers (11–13)	**Al Hollingsworth** (7–17)	None	see 2nd game	44–93
138	September 18 (2)	Pirates	1–1 (5)^{^{[j]}}	None	None	None	1,500	44–93–1
–	September 19 (1)	Pirates	Canceled (rain); No makeup scheduled					
–	September 19 (2)	Pirates	Canceled (rain); No makeup scheduled					
–	September 20 (1)	Cubs	Postponed (rain); Makeup: September 21 as a traditional double-header					
–	September 20 (2)	Cubs	Postponed (rain); Makeup: September 22 as a traditional double-header					
–	September 21 (1)	Cubs	Postponed (rain); Makeup: September 23 as a traditional double-header					
–	September 21 (2)	Cubs	Postponed (rain); Makeup: September 23 as a traditional double-header					
139	September 22 (1)	Cubs	0–4	Bill Lee (20–9)	**Max Butcher** (9–10)	None	see 2nd game	44–94–1
140	September 22 (2)	Cubs	1–2	Clay Bryant (18–11)	**Claude Passeau** (10–17)	None	2,000	44–95–1
141	September 23 (1)	Cubs	2–3	Jack Russell (6–1)	**Hugh Mulcahy** (10–18)	None	see 2nd game	44–96–1
142	September 23 (2)	Cubs	6–7	Larry French (10–18)	**Al Hollingsworth** (7–18)	None	1,000	44–97–1
143	September 24	@ Dodgers	1–8	Vito Tamulis (11–9)	**Tom Lanning** (0–1)	None	2,772	44–98–1
144	September 25 (1)^{^{[k]}}	@ Dodgers	1–5	Luke Hamlin (12–14)	**Max Butcher** (9–11)	Tot Pressnell (3)	see 2nd game	44–99–1
145	September 25 (2)^{^{[k]}}	@ Dodgers	5–1 (7)	**Claude Passeau** (11–17)	Lee Rogers (1–3)	None	8,124	45–99–1
146	September 27 (1)^{^{[l]}}	@ Bees	1–2 (11)	Jim Turner (14–17)	**Hugh Mulcahy** (10–19)	None	see 2nd game	45–100–1
147	September 27 (2)^{^{[l]}}	@ Bees	1–4	Tom Earley (1–0)	**Elmer Burkart** (0–1)	None	11,617	45–101–1
148	September 28	@ Bees	1–3	Ira Hutchinson (9–8)	**Pete Sivess** (3–6)	None	952	45–102–1
149	September 29	@ Giants	2–9	Cliff Melton (14–14)	**Max Butcher** (9–12)	None	1,190	45–103–1
–	September 30	@ Giants	Canceled (rain); No makeup scheduled					

October (0–2)

#	Date	Opponent	Score	Win	Loss	Save	Attendance	Record
150	October 2 (1)^{^{[m]}}	Dodgers	3–7	Sam Nahem (1–0)	**Claude Passeau** (11–18)	None	see 2nd game	45–104–1
151	October 2 (2)^{^{[m]}}	Dodgers	2–7	John Gaddy (2–0)	**Hugh Mulcahy** (10–20)	None	500	45–105–1

^{^[a]}The second game on June 12, 1938, was called due to the Pennsylvania Sunday curfew in the middle of the second inning with the score 0–0. Since the game was not yet official, it was replayed from the beginning on August 25.
^{^[b]}The June 30, 1938, game was protested by the Phillies in the bottom of the first inning. The protest is not mentioned in contemporary newspaper accounts.
^{^[c]}The original schedule indicated single games on July 3 and August 10 in Brooklyn which became a double-header on July 3. Contemporary newspaper accounts indicated the August 10 game was postponed due to rain.
^{^[d]}The original schedule indicated single games on July 10 (in Philadelphia) and August 11 (in Brooklyn) with Brooklyn which became a double-header on July 10 (in Philadelphia).
^{^[e]}The original schedule indicated single games on June 9 and July 24 at Cincinnati which became a double-header on July 24.
^{^[f]}The second game on July 31, 1938, ended after seven innings due to the Pennsylvania Sunday curfew law with the score 3–4.
^{^[g]}The original schedule indicated single games on August 7 and September 15 with St. Louis which became a double-header on August 7.
^{^[h]}The original schedule indicated single games on August 28 and 29 at Chicago which became a double-header on August 28.
^{^[i]}The original schedule indicated a home game on September 8 with Brooklyn which became an away game at Brooklyn. This became necessary because the August 11 away game at Brooklyn became the July 10 home game in Philadelphia.^{(See note d above.)}
^{^[j]}The September 18, 1938, game ended after five innings due to darkness with the score tied 1–1, and an additional game was scheduled for September 19.
^{^[k]}The original schedule indicated single games on September 23 and 25 at Brooklyn which became a double-header on September 25. September 23 was used to reschedule home games with Chicago that were postponed due to rain on September 20 and 21.
^{^[l]}The original schedule indicated single games on September 26 and 27 at Boston which became a double-header on September 27.
^{^[m]}The original schedule indicated single games on October 1 and 2 with Brooklyn which became a double-header on October 2.

=== Roster ===
1938 Philadelphia Phillies
**Roster**
**Pitchers**: -- Elmer Burkart; 24 Max Butcher; 19 Bill Hallahan; 21 Ed Heusser; 17 Al Hollingsworth; 22 Syl Johnson; 24 Hal Kelleher; 21 Wayne LaMaster; -- Tom Lanning; 15 Hugh Mulcahy; 13 Claude Passeau; 16 Tommy Reis; 20 Pete Sivess; 18 Al Smith; 17 Bucky Walters	**Catchers**: 11 Bill Atwood; 10 Cap Clark; 28,4 Spud Davis; 12 Jimmie Wilson; **Infielders**: 8 Earl Browne; 23 Gene Corbett; -- Eddie Feinberg; 8 Buck Jordan; 9 Heinie Mueller; 6 George Scharein; -- Justin Stein; 14 Phil Weintraub; 5 Pinky Whitney; 7 Del Young	**Outfielders**: 3 Morrie Arnovich; 16 Gibby Brack; 1 Chuck Klein; 2 Hersh Martin; -- Alex Pitko; 19 Art Rebel; 16 Tuck Stainback; 4 Ray Stoviak; **Other batters**: -- Howie Gorman	**Manager**: 12 Jimmie Wilson; **Coaches**: 22 Syl Johnson; 25 Hans Lobert

== Player stats ==
=== Batting ===
==== Starters by position ====
Note: Pos = Position; G = Games played; AB = At bats; H = Hits; Avg. = Batting average; HR = Home runs; RBI = Runs batted in

Pos	Player	G	AB	H	Avg.	HR	RBI
C	Bill Atwood	102	281	55	.196	3	28
1B	Phil Weintraub	100	351	109	.311	4	45
2B	Heinie Mueller	136	444	111	.250	4	34
SS	Del Young	108	340	78	.229	0	31
3B	Pinky Whitney	102	300	83	.277	3	38
OF	Chuck Klein	129	458	113	.247	8	61
OF	Hersh Martin	120	466	139	.298	3	39
OF	Morrie Arnovich	139	502	138	.275	4	72

==== Other batters ====
Note: G = Games played; AB = At bats; H = Hits; Avg. = Batting average; HR = Home runs; RBI = Runs batted in

Player	G	AB	H	Avg.	HR	RBI
George Scharein	117	390	93	.238	1	29
Buck Jordan	87	310	93	.300	0	18
Gibby Brack	72	282	81	.287	4	28
Spud Davis	70	215	53	.247	2	23
Tuck Stainback	30	81	21	.259	1	11
Gene Corbett	24	75	6	.080	2	7
Cap Clark	52	74	19	.257	0	4
Earl Browne	21	74	19	.257	0	8
Justin Stein	11	39	10	.256	0	2
Eddie Feinberg	10	20	3	.150	0	0
Alex Pitko	7	19	6	.316	0	2
Ray Stoviak	10	10	0	.000	0	0
Art Rebel	7	9	2	.222	0	1
Jimmie Wilson	3	2	0	.000	0	0
Howie Gorman	1	1	0	.000	0	0

=== Pitching ===
==== Starting pitchers ====
Note: G = Games pitched; IP = Innings pitched; W = Wins; L = Losses; ERA = Earned run average; SO = Strikeouts

Player	G	IP	W	L	ERA	SO
Hugh Mulcahy	46	267.1	10	20	4.61	90
Claude Passeau	44	239.0	11	18	4.52	100
Al Hollingsworth	24	174.1	5	16	3.82	80
Max Butcher	12	98.1	4	8	2.93	29
Bucky Walters	12	82.2	4	8	5.23	28

==== Other pitchers ====
Note: G = Games pitched; IP = Innings pitched; W = Wins; L = Losses; ERA = Earned run average; SO = Strikeouts

Player	G	IP	W	L	ERA	SO
Pete Sivess	39	116.0	3	6	5.51	32
Bill Hallahan	21	89.0	1	8	5.46	22
Syl Johnson	22	83.0	2	7	4.23	21
Wayne LaMaster	18	63.2	4	7	7.77	35
Elmer Burkart	2	10.0	0	1	4.50	1
Tom Lanning	3	7.0	0	1	6.43	2

==== Relief pitchers ====
Note: G = Games pitched; W = Wins; L = Losses; SV = Saves; ERA = Earned run average; SO = Strikeouts

Player	G	W	L	SV	ERA	SO
Al Smith	37	1	4	1	6.28	46
Hal Kelleher	6	0	0	0	18.41	4
Tommy Reis	4	0	1	0	19.29	2
Ed Heusser	1	0	0	0	27.00	0

== Farm system ==
Level	Team	League	Manager
B	Montgomery Bombers	Southeastern League	Bud Connolly
D	Centreville Colts	Eastern Shore League	Patsy O'Rourke
D	Jonesboro Giants	Northeast Arkansas League	Pete Cooper, Gus Albright and Fred Millican
