= 1938 Brooklyn Dodgers season =

1938 Brooklyn Dodgers
- League: National League
- Ballpark: Ebbets Field
- City: Brooklyn, New York
- Record: 69–80 (.463)
- League place: 7th
- Owners: James & Dearie Mulvey, Brooklyn Trust Company
- President: Larry MacPhail
- Managers: Burleigh Grimes

The 1938 Brooklyn Dodgers season was their 55th season. The team finished with a record of 69–80, finishing in seventh place in the National League. The 1938 season saw Babe Ruth hired as the first base coach, and lights installed by the team at Ebbets Field on June 15.

== Offseason ==
- March 6, 1938: Eddie Morgan and cash were traded by the Dodgers to the Philadelphia Phillies for Dolph Camilli.

== Regular season ==
- June 15, 1938: Leo Durocher was the final out of the ninth inning as Johnny Vander Meer of the Cincinnati Reds threw the second of his two consecutive no hitters.

=== Season standings ===
National League
Team	W	L	Pct.	GB	Home	Road
Chicago Cubs	89	63	.586	—	44‍–‍33	45‍–‍30
Pittsburgh Pirates	86	64	.573	2	44‍–‍33	42‍–‍31
New York Giants	83	67	.553	5	43‍–‍30	40‍–‍37
Cincinnati Reds	82	68	.547	6	43‍–‍34	39‍–‍34
Boston Bees	77	75	.507	12	45‍–‍30	32‍–‍45
St. Louis Cardinals	71	80	.470	17½	36‍–‍41	35‍–‍39
Brooklyn Dodgers	69	80	.463	18½	31‍–‍41	38‍–‍39
Philadelphia Phillies	45	105	.300	43	26‍–‍48	19‍–‍57

=== Record vs. opponents ===
1938 National League record Sources:
Team	BSN	BRO	CHC	CIN	NYG	PHI	PIT	STL
Boston	—	10–12	12–10	11–9	8–14	14–8	9–13	13–9–1
Brooklyn	10–12	—	9–11–1	9–13	8–14	15–7	9–11	9–12–1
Chicago	12–10	11–9–1	—	11–11	12–10	18–4	12–10	13–9–1
Cincinnati	9–11	13–9	11–11	—	12–9	14–7	10–12	13–9–1
New York	14–8	14–8	10–12	9–12	—	16–5	9–13–1	11–9–1
Philadelphia	8–14	7–15	4–18	7–14	5–16	—	8–12–1	6–16
Pittsburgh	13–9	11–9	10–12	12–10	13–9–1	12–8–1	—	15–7
St. Louis	9–13–1	12–9–1	9–13–1	9–13–1	9–11–1	16–6	7–15	—

=== Notable transactions ===
- April 15, 1938: Ernie Koy was purchased by the Dodgers from the New York Yankees.
- May 2, 1938: Tom Winsett was purchased from the Dodgers by the New York Giants.
- July 9, 1938: Buck Marrow was purchased from the Dodgers by the Cleveland Indians.
- July 11, 1938: Whit Wyatt was purchased by the Dodgers from the Cleveland Indians.
- July 11, 1938: Gibby Brack was traded by the Dodgers to the Philadelphia Phillies for Tuck Stainback.
- July 19, 1938: Johnnie Chambers was purchased by the Dodgers from the St. Louis Cardinals.
- August 8, 1938: Max Butcher was traded by the Dodgers to the Philadelphia Phillies for Wayne LaMaster.
- August 12, 1938: Johnnie Chambers was traded by the Dodgers to the Boston Red Sox for Lee Rogers.
- August 23, 1938: The Dodgers traded cash and a player to be named later to the Washington Senators for Fred Sington. The Dodgers completed the deal by sending Johnnie Chambers to the Red Sox on January 5, 1939.
- September 9, 1938: Jimmy Outlaw was purchased by the Dodgers from the Cincinnati Reds. The purchase was voided on September 14.
- September 14, 1938: Don Ross was purchased by the Dodgers from the Detroit Tigers.

=== Roster ===
1938 Brooklyn Dodgers
Roster
Pitchers: 17 Max Butcher; 14 Freddie Fitzsimmons; 11 Fred Frankhouse; -- John Gaddy; 12 Luke Hamlin; 15 Waite Hoyt; 23 Wayne LaMaster; 24 Buck Marrow; -- Sam Nahem; 16 Van Mungo; 21 Bill Posedel; 23 Dykes Potter; 21 Tot Pressnell; 24 Lee Rogers; 15 Vito Tamulis; -- Jim Winford	Catchers: -- Gilly Campbell; 8 Paul Chervinko; -- Greek George; -- Ray Hayworth; 9 Babe Phelps; 26 Merv Shea; 10 Roy Spencer; 7 Ray Thomas; Infielders: 4 Dolph Camilli; 3 Pete Coscarart; 2 Leo Durocher; 1 Woody English; 6 Johnny Hudson; 5 Cookie Lavagetto; 1 Packy Rogers; 7 Woody Williams	Outfielders: 30 Gibby Brack; 25 Kiki Cuyler; 22 Buddy Hassett; 17 Oris Hockett; 20 Ernie Koy; 26 Heinie Manush; 27 Goody Rosen; 37 Fred Sington; 30 Tuck Stainback; 29 Tom Winsett; Other batters: 28 Bert Haas	Manager: 13 Burleigh Grimes; Coaches: 31 Jesse Haines; 32 Andy High; 35 Babe Ruth; 29 Tom Sheehan

== Player stats ==
=== Batting ===
==== Starters by position ====
Note: Pos = Position; G = Games played; AB = At bats; H = Hits; Avg. = Batting average; HR = Home runs; RBI = Runs batted in

Pos	Player	G	AB	H	Avg.	HR	RBI
C	Babe Phelps	66	208	54	.308	5	46
1B	Dolph Camilli	146	509	128	.251	24	100
2B	Johnny Hudson	135	498	130	.261	2	37
3B	Cookie Lavagetto	137	487	133	.273	6	79
SS	Leo Durocher	141	479	105	.219	1	56
OF	Ernie Koy	142	521	156	.299	11	76
OF	Goody Rosen	138	473	133	.281	4	51
OF	Buddy Hassett	115	335	98	.293	0	40

==== Other batters ====
Note: G = Games played; AB = At bats; H = Hits; Avg. = Batting average; HR = Home runs; RBI = Runs batted in

Player	G	AB	H	Avg.	HR	RBI
Kiki Cuyler	82	253	69	.273	2	23
Gilly Campbell	54	126	31	.246	0	11
Merv Shea	48	120	22	.183	0	12
Tuck Stainback	35	104	34	.327	0	20
Pete Coscarart	32	79	12	.152	0	6
Woody English	34	72	18	.250	0	7
Oris Hockett	21	70	23	.329	1	8
Gibby Brack	40	56	12	.214	1	6
Fred Sington	28	53	19	.358	2	5
Heinie Manush	17	51	12	.235	0	6
Woody Williams	20	51	17	.333	0	6
Roy Spencer	16	45	12	.267	0	6
Packy Rogers	23	37	7	.189	0	5
Tom Winsett	12	30	9	.300	1	7
Paul Chervinko	12	27	4	.148	0	3
Greek George	7	20	4	.200	0	2
Ray Hayworth	5	4	0	.000	0	0
Ray Thomas	1	3	1	.333	0	0
Bert Haas	1	0	0	----	0	0

=== Pitching ===
==== Starting pitchers ====
Note: G = Games pitched; IP = Innings pitched; W = Wins; L = Losses; ERA = Earned run average; SO = Strikeouts

Player	G	IP	W	L	ERA	SO
Luke Hamlin	44	237.1	12	15	3.68	97
Freddie Fitzsimmons	27	202.2	11	8	3.02	38
Van Mungo	24	133.1	4	11	3.92	72
John Gaddy	2	13.0	2	0	0.69	3
Sam Nahem	1	9.0	1	0	3.00	2

==== Other pitchers ====
Note: G = Games pitched; IP = Innings pitched; W = Wins; L = Losses; ERA = Earned run average; SO = Strikeouts

Player	G	IP	W	L	ERA	SO
Tot Pressnell	43	192.0	11	14	3.56	57
Vito Tamulis	38	159.2	12	6	3.83	70
Bill Posedel	33	140.0	8	9	5.66	49
Fred Frankhouse	30	93.2	3	5	4.04	32
Max Butcher	24	72.2	5	4	6.56	21
Lee Rogers	12	23.2	0	2	5.70	11
Waite Hoyt	6	16.1	0	3	4.96	3
Jim Winford	2	5.2	0	1	11.12	4

==== Relief pitchers ====
Note: G = Games pitched; W = Wins; L = Losses; SV = Saves; ERA = Earned run average; SO = Strikeouts

Player	G	W	L	SV	ERA	SO
Buck Marrow	15	0	1	0	4.58	6
Wayne LaMaster	3	0	1	0	4.76	3
Dykes Potter	2	0	0	0	4.50	1

== Awards and honors ==
- 1938 Major League Baseball All-Star Game
  - Leo Durocher starting shortstop
  - Cookie Lavagetto
  - Babe Phelps

== Farm system ==
Level	Team	League	Manager
A1	Nashville Vols	Southern Association	Chuck Dressen
A	Elmira Pioneers	Eastern League	Clyde Sukeforth
B	Winston-Salem Twins	Piedmont League	Walt Van Grofski; Joe Prerost
B	Pensacola Pilots	Southeastern League	Wally Dashiell
B	Clinton Owls	Illinois–Indiana–Iowa League	Oliver Marquardt
C	Greenwood Crackers	Cotton States League	Elmer Yoter
C	Dayton Ducks	Middle Atlantic League	Red Rollings; Howard Holmes; Jim Lindsey
D	Tallahassee Capitols	Georgia–Florida League	Tim Muchison
D	Beatrice Blues	Nebraska State League	Leon Riley
D	Cooleemee Weavers	North Carolina State League	Joe Bird
D	Superior Blues	Northern League	George Treadwell

LEAGUE CHAMPIONS: Elmira, Pensacola, Superior
