= 1938 Pittsburgh Pirates season =

1938 Pittsburgh Pirates
- League: National League
- Ballpark: Forbes Field
- City: Pittsburgh, Pennsylvania
- Owners: Bill Benswanger
- Managers: Pie Traynor
- Radio: KDKA; WWSW; Rosey Rowswell

The 1938 Pittsburgh Pirates season was the 57th season of the Pittsburgh Pirates franchise and their 52nd in the National League. The Pirates maintained a seven-game lead in the NL on September 1, but went 12–16–1 for the rest of the season and relinquished the lead to the Chicago Cubs on September 28, losing to the Cubs on Gabby Hartnett's "Homer in the Gloamin'". The Pirates finished second in the league with an 86–64 record.

== Offseason ==
- February 22, 1938: Tommy Thevenow was signed as a free agent by the Pirates.

== Regular season ==
=== Season standings ===
National League
Team	W	L	Pct.	GB	Home	Road
Chicago Cubs	89	63	.586	—	44‍–‍33	45‍–‍30
Pittsburgh Pirates	86	64	.573	2	44‍–‍33	42‍–‍31
New York Giants	83	67	.553	5	43‍–‍30	40‍–‍37
Cincinnati Reds	82	68	.547	6	43‍–‍34	39‍–‍34
Boston Bees	77	75	.507	12	45‍–‍30	32‍–‍45
St. Louis Cardinals	71	80	.470	17½	36‍–‍41	35‍–‍39
Brooklyn Dodgers	69	80	.463	18½	31‍–‍41	38‍–‍39
Philadelphia Phillies	45	105	.300	43	26‍–‍48	19‍–‍57

=== Record vs. opponents ===
1938 National League record Sources:
Team	BSN	BRO	CHC	CIN	NYG	PHI	PIT	STL
Boston	—	10–12	12–10	11–9	8–14	14–8	9–13	13–9–1
Brooklyn	10–12	—	9–11–1	9–13	8–14	15–7	9–11	9–12–1
Chicago	12–10	11–9–1	—	11–11	12–10	18–4	12–10	13–9–1
Cincinnati	9–11	13–9	11–11	—	12–9	14–7	10–12	13–9–1
New York	14–8	14–8	10–12	9–12	—	16–5	9–13–1	11–9–1
Philadelphia	8–14	7–15	4–18	7–14	5–16	—	8–12–1	6–16
Pittsburgh	13–9	11–9	10–12	12–10	13–9–1	12–8–1	—	15–7
St. Louis	9–13–1	12–9–1	9–13–1	9–13–1	9–11–1	16–6	7–15	—

=== Game log ===
1938 Game Log: 86–64 (Home: 44–33; Away: 42–31)
April: 8–3 (Home: 5–2; Away: 3–1)

#	Date	Opponent	Score	Win	Loss	Save	Attendance	Record
1	April 19	@ Cardinals	4–3	**Klinger** (1–0)	Weiland	—	19,865	1–0
2	April 20	@ Cardinals	9–4	**Tobin** (1–0)	Johnson	—	1,957	2–0
3	April 21	@ Cardinals	6–5	**Brown** (1–0)	Bush	—	—	3–0
4	April 22	Reds	7–4	**Lucas** (1–0)	Vander Meer	**Bauers** (1)	20,500	4–0
5	April 23	Reds	6–2	**Blanton** (1–0)	Schott	—	—	5–0
6	April 24	Reds	2–1	**Tobin** (2–0)	Davis	—	16,012	6–0
7	April 25	Cubs	8–6	**Brown** (2–0)	Logan	—	9,235	7–0
8	April 26	Cubs	3–5 (10)	Carleton	**Swift** (0–1)	—	7,523	7–1
9	April 27	Cubs	6–5	**Brown** (3–0)	French	**Klinger** (1)	9,537	8–1
10	April 28	Cardinals	3–5	Weiland	**Tobin** (2–1)	McGee	8,033	8–2
11	April 30	@ Reds	0–2	Davis	**Bauers** (0–1)	—	—	8–3

May: 9–15 (Home: 5–7; Away: 4–8)

#	Date	Opponent	Score	Win	Loss	Save	Attendance	Record
12	May 1	@ Reds	1–4	Hollingsworth	**Swift** (0–2)	Schott	14,439	8–4
13	May 2	@ Reds	6–8	Vander Meer	**Blanton** (1–1)	Benge	—	8–5
14	May 3	Dodgers	2–7	Pressnell	**Tobin** (2–2)	—	2,266	8–6
15	May 4	Dodgers	9–5	**Bowman** (1–0)	Posedel	—	2,431	9–6
16	May 5	Dodgers	4–2	**Lucas** (2–0)	Hoyt	—	2,031	10–6
17	May 6	Giants	7–11	Melton	**Brown** (3–1)	Coffman	10,648	10–7
18	May 7	Giants	5–6	Brown	**Bowman** (1–1)	—	16,064	10–8
19	May 8	Bees	2–1 (12)	**Brown** (4–1)	Fette	—	7,512	11–8
20	May 9	Bees	5–7 (10)	Hutchinson	**Brandt** (0–1)	Shoffner	1,219	11–9
21	May 13	@ Cubs	4–1 (10)	**Brown** (5–1)	French	—	—	12–9
22	May 15	@ Cubs	4–3 (11)	**Swift** (1–2)	Root	—	15,494	13–9
23	May 17	@ Bees	0–1	Shoffner	**Bauers** (0–2)	—	2,800	13–10
24	May 18	@ Bees	1–2 (14)	Turner	**Brown** (5–2)	—	2,070	13–11
25	May 19	@ Bees	3–4 (11)	Hutchinson	**Sewell** (0–1)	—	2,359	13–12
26	May 20	@ Dodgers	5–7	Mungo	**Lucas** (2–1)	Pressnell	4,749	13–13
27	May 21	@ Dodgers	5–4	**Tobin** (3–2)	Hamlin	—	14,610	14–13
28	May 22	@ Giants	2–18	Hubbell	**Brandt** (0–2)	—	30,343	14–14
29	May 23	@ Giants	4–3	**Brown** (6–2)	Gumbert	**Bauers** (2)	5,364	15–14
30	May 25	@ Phillies	1–2	Walters	**Tobin** (3–3)	—	1,000	15–15
31	May 27	Cubs	0–5	Lee	**Klinger** (1–1)	—	3,010	15–16
32	May 28	Cubs	3–9	Bryant	**Bauers** (0–3)	—	4,014	15–17
33	May 29	Cubs	2–1	**Lucas** (3–1)	French	—	7,050	16–17
34	May 30	Cardinals	5–4 (17)	**Klinger** (2–1)	McGee	—	—	17–17
35	May 30	Cardinals	6–9	Davis	**Bowman** (1–2)	—	20,000	17–18

June: 16–7 (Home: 9–4; Away: 7–3)

#	Date	Opponent	Score	Win	Loss	Save	Attendance	Record
36	June 1	Giants	4–1	**Bauers** (1–3)	Melton	—	4,001	18–18
37	June 3	Giants	6–5	**Klinger** (3–1)	Gumbert	—	8,513	19–18
38	June 4	Dodgers	4–3 (11)	**Swift** (2–2)	Pressnell	—	4,168	20–18
39	June 5	Dodgers	5–10	Posedel	**Bowman** (1–3)	Tamulis	6,800	20–19
40	June 6	Dodgers	4–9	Butcher	**Lucas** (3–2)	—	1,594	20–20
41	June 8	Bees	4–1	**Klinger** (4–1)	Fette	—	2,765	21–20
42	June 9	Bees	5–3	**Brown** (7–2)	Turner	—	4,410	22–20
43	June 10	Phillies	2–3	Mulcahy	**Bauers** (1–4)	—	1,034	22–21
44	June 11	Phillies	4–3	**Swift** (3–2)	Walters	—	3,811	23–21
45	June 12	Phillies	11–5	**Brown** (8–2)	Passeau	—	4,826	24–21
46	June 14	@ Giants	3–5	Schumacher	**Bauers** (1–5)	—	5,334	24–22
47	June 15	@ Giants	2–0	**Tobin** (4–3)	Melton	—	5,874	25–22
48	June 16	@ Giants	10–2	**Klinger** (5–1)	Hubbell	—	6,880	26–22
49	June 17	@ Phillies	4–3 (10)	**Brown** (9–2)	Hollingsworth	—	4,000	27–22
50	June 18	@ Phillies	3–5	Mulcahy	**Bauers** (1–6)	Passeau	—	27–23
51	June 19	@ Phillies	14–4	**Tobin** (5–3)	Sivess	—	—	28–23
52	June 19	@ Phillies	16–3	**Blanton** (2–1)	LaMaster	—	10,000	29–23
53	June 21	@ Dodgers	9–3	**Bauers** (2–6)	Tamulis	—	25,527	30–23
54	June 23	@ Dodgers	1–8	Pressnell	**Swift** (3–3)	—	3,258	30–24
55	June 25	@ Bees	8–7	**Brown** (10–2)	Hutchinson	**Bauers** (3)	5,614	31–24
56	June 28	Reds	2–5	Vander Meer	**Bauers** (2–7)	—	—	31–25
57	June 29	Reds	5–4	**Swift** (4–3)	Cascarella	—	3,470	32–25
58	June 30	Reds	3–1	**Blanton** (3–1)	Walters	—	3,685	33–25

July: 24–7 (Home: 12–5; Away: 12–2)

#	Date	Opponent	Score	Win	Loss	Save	Attendance	Record
59	July 2	Cardinals	5–1	**Klinger** (6–1)	McGee	—	3,892	34–25
60	July 3	Cardinals	6–5 (12)	**Brown** (11–2)	Shoun	—	—	35–25
61	July 3	Cardinals	6–2 (8)	**Bauers** (3–7)	Henshaw	—	20,000	36–25
62	July 4	@ Reds	2–1	**Blanton** (4–1)	Davis	—	—	37–25
63	July 4	@ Reds	3–2	**Swift** (5–3)	Walters	—	22,400	38–25
64	July 8	@ Cardinals	6–2	**Klinger** (7–1)	McGee	—	—	39–25
65	July 9	@ Cardinals	8–7	**Brown** (12–2)	Lanier	—	2,859	40–25
66	July 10	@ Cardinals	5–2	**Blanton** (5–1)	Macon	—	—	41–25
67	July 10	@ Cardinals	4–3	**Bauers** (4–7)	Weiland	**Bowman** (1)	—	42–25
68	July 11	@ Cubs	5–3	**Tobin** (6–3)	French	**Brown** (1)	—	43–25
69	July 12	@ Cubs	14–6	**Brandt** (1–2)	Carleton	**Sewell** (1)	—	44–25
70	July 13	Dodgers	5–10	Pressnell	**Brown** (12–3)	—	5,561	44–26
71	July 14	Dodgers	3–2 (11)	**Tobin** (7–3)	Fitzsimmons	—	7,802	45–26
72	July 15	Dodgers	4–9	Hamlin	**Swift** (5–4)	—	4,512	45–27
73	July 16	Giants	7–3	**Klinger** (8–1)	Melton	—	15,197	46–27
74	July 17	Giants	1–2	Hubbell	**Tobin** (7–4)	—	—	46–28
75	July 17	Giants	7–7			—	43,241	46–28
76	July 18	Giants	7–4	**Blanton** (6–1)	Gumbert	**Swift** (1)	8,638	47–28
77	July 19	Phillies	8–0	**Brandt** (2–2)	Mulcahy	—	2,472	48–28
78	July 20	Phillies	0–11	Hollingsworth	**Klinger** (8–2)	—	—	48–29
79	July 20	Phillies	4–1	**Bauers** (5–7)	Sivess	—	6,000	49–29
80	July 21	Phillies	5–4	**Brown** (13–3)	Smith	—	10,535	50–29
81	July 22	Bees	4–3	**Blanton** (7–1)	Turner	—	4,749	51–29
82	July 23	Bees	2–4	MacFayden	**Bauers** (5–8)	Errickson	—	51–30
83	July 24	Bees	5–4 (15)	**Tobin** (8–4)	Hutchinson	—	—	52–30
84	July 24	Bees	4–2 (6)	**Brandt** (3–2)	Lanning	—	—	53–30
85	July 26	@ Phillies	5–6	Sivess	**Brown** (13–4)	—	1,500	53–31
86	July 27	@ Phillies	4–2	**Bauers** (6–8)	Hallahan	—	—	54–31
87	July 28	@ Phillies	9–2	**Tobin** (9–4)	Hollingsworth	—	2,000	55–31
88	July 29	@ Dodgers	7–6	**Bowman** (2–3)	Pressnell	**Swift** (2)	2,582	56–31
89	July 30	@ Dodgers	9–2	**Blanton** (8–1)	Tamulis	**Brown** (2)	8,523	57–31
90	July 31	@ Dodgers	3–4	Posedel	**Swift** (5–5)	—	27,719	57–32

August: 16–16 (Home: 9–10; Away: 7–6)

#	Date	Opponent	Score	Win	Loss	Save	Attendance	Record
91	August 2	@ Bees	1–3	Lanning	**Tobin** (9–5)	—	2,451	57–33
92	August 3	@ Bees	9–4	**Blanton** (9–1)	Turner	**Brown** (3)	7,844	58–33
93	August 3	@ Bees	5–3	**Bowman** (3–3)	Reis	—	7,844	59–33
94	August 4	@ Bees	3–4	MacFayden	**Brown** (13–5)	—	1,834	59–34
95	August 5	@ Giants	3–5	Brown	**Klinger** (8–3)	—	18,535	59–35
96	August 7	@ Giants	5–1	**Tobin** (10–5)	Gumbert	—	—	60–35
97	August 7	@ Giants	13–3	**Brandt** (4–2)	Hubbell	—	50,468	61–35
98	August 9	Cardinals	1–0	**Bauers** (7–8)	Henshaw	—	5,000	62–35
99	August 10	Cardinals	0–5 (7)	Warneke	**Klinger** (8–4)	—	14,000	62–36
100	August 12	Cubs	3–9	Lee	**Tobin** (10–6)	—	14,962	62–37
101	August 13	Cubs	5–11	Dean	**Blanton** (9–2)	Page	15,332	62–38
102	August 14	Cubs	2–0	**Bauers** (8–8)	Root	**Brown** (4)	24,193	63–38
103	August 15	Reds	2–6	Cascarella	**Brown** (13–6)	Davis	6,143	63–39
104	August 16	Reds	10–0	**Blanton** (10–2)	Davis	—	6,253	64–39
105	August 17	@ Cardinals	4–3 (10)	**Swift** (6–5)	Henshaw	—	2,725	65–39
106	August 18	@ Cardinals	1–5	Weiland	**Bauers** (8–9)	—	—	65–40
107	August 20	@ Cubs	5–2	**Lucas** (4–2)	Dean	**Swift** (3)	—	66–40
108	August 21	@ Cubs	4–6	Lee	**Blanton** (10–3)	Russell	—	66–41
109	August 21	@ Cubs	1–6	Carleton	**Bauers** (8–10)	—	40,402	66–42
110	August 22	@ Cubs	4–2	**Tobin** (11–6)	Bryant	—	—	67–42
111	August 23	Bees	0–6	Lanning	**Klinger** (8–5)	—	12,294	67–43
112	August 23	Bees	4–3 (14)	**Brown** (14–6)	Errickson	—	12,294	68–43
113	August 24	Bees	6–2	**Bauers** (9–10)	Hutchinson	—	4,040	69–43
114	August 25	Phillies	1–2	Butcher	**Blanton** (10–4)	—	—	69–44
115	August 25	Phillies	1–2 (11)	Hallahan	**Lucas** (4–3)	—	3,093	69–45
116	August 26	Phillies	4–6	Smith	**Tobin** (11–7)	Sivess	—	69–46
117	August 27	Phillies	6–1	**Brandt** (5–2)	Hollingsworth	—	5,889	70–46
118	August 28	Dodgers	5–8	Pressnell	**Bauers** (9–11)	—	16,045	70–47
119	August 29	Dodgers	10–1	**Blanton** (11–4)	Posedel	—	3,425	71–47
120	August 30	Giants	7–1	**Tobin** (12–7)	Coffman	—	—	72–47
121	August 31	Giants	5–6	Wittig	**Bauers** (9–12)	—	—	72–48
122	August 31	Giants	12–3	**Lucas** (5–3)	Melton	—	43,586	73–48

September: 13–14 (Home: 4–5; Away: 9–9)

#	Date	Opponent	Score	Win	Loss	Save	Attendance	Record
123	September 1	Giants	6–0	**Klinger** (9–5)	Schumacher	—	28,839	74–48
124	September 2	Cardinals	10–11	Weiland	**Blanton** (11–5)	McGee	4,480	74–49
125	September 3	Cardinals	0–6	Macon	**Tobin** (12–8)	—	7,759	74–50
126	September 4	Cardinals	5–3	**Bauers** (10–12)	Henshaw	—	12,187	75–50
127	September 5	Cubs	0–3	Lee	**Brandt** (5–3)	—	—	75–51
128	September 5	Cubs	3–4	Bryant	**Tobin** (12–9)	—	42,545	75–52
129	September 7	@ Reds	7–1	**Klinger** (10–5)	Derringer	—	8,839	76–52
130	September 8	@ Reds	3–5	Vander Meer	**Blanton** (11–6)	—	29,043	76–53
131	September 10	@ Cardinals	14–7	**Brown** (15–6)	Macon	—	3,632	77–53
132	September 11	@ Cardinals	4–6	Dean	**Bauers** (10–13)	—	15,739	77–54
133	September 14	@ Giants	0–3	Schumacher	**Blanton** (11–7)	—	—	77–55
134	September 14	@ Giants	3–10	Gumbert	**Brandt** (5–4)	—	28,185	77–56
135	September 15	@ Giants	7–2	**Tobin** (13–9)	Melton	—	4,978	78–56
136	September 16	@ Bees	7–6 (11)	**Swift** (7–5)	MacFayden	—	8,296	79–56
137	September 16	@ Bees	4–5	Errickson	**Bowman** (3–4)	—	8,296	79–57
138	September 17	@ Bees	2–1	**Klinger** (11–5)	Shoffner	—	—	80–57
139	September 18	@ Phillies	1–0	**Bauers** (11–13)	Hollingsworth	—	—	81–57
140	September 18	@ Phillies	1–1 (5)			—	1,500	81–57
141	September 22	@ Dodgers	6–0	**Tobin** (14–9)	Fitzsimmons	—	—	82–57
142	September 22	@ Dodgers	11–6	**Klinger** (12–5)	Hamlin	**Brown** (5)	—	83–57
143	September 23	Reds	4–5 (12)	Walters	**Brown** (15–7)	—	7,429	83–58
144	September 24	Reds	4–1	**Bauers** (12–13)	Vander Meer	—	11,318	84–58
145	September 25	Reds	5–3	**Lucas** (6–3)	Derringer	**Swift** (4)	27,147	85–58
146	September 27	@ Cubs	1–2	Dean	**Tobin** (14–10)	Lee	42,238	85–59
147	September 28	@ Cubs	5–6	Root	**Brown** (15–8)	—	34,465	85–60
148	September 29	@ Cubs	1–10	Lee	**Bauers** (12–14)	—	—	85–61
149	September 30	@ Reds	1–7	Derringer	**Tobin** (14–11)	—	—	85–62
150	September 30	@ Reds	4–2	**Bauers** (13–14)	Moore	—	8,361	86–62

October: 0–2 (Home: 0–0; Away: 0–2)

#	Date	Opponent	Score	Win	Loss	Save	Attendance	Record
151	October 1	@ Reds	6–9	Weaver	**Brown** (15–9)	—	6,351	86–63
152	October 2	@ Reds	4–5	Vander Meer	**Tobin** (14–12)	—	14,007	86–64

Legend: = Win = Loss = Tie
Bold = Pirates team member

=== Roster ===
1938 Pittsburgh Pirates
**Roster**
**Pitchers**: 51 Russ Bauers; 46 Cy Blanton; 48 Joe Bowman; 49 Ed Brandt; 47 Mace Brown; 53 Ken Heintzelman; 41 Bob Klinger; 40 Red Lucas; 44 Rip Sewell; 45 Bill Swift; 50 Jim Tobin	**Catchers**: 32 Ray Berres; 30 Al Todd; **Infielders**: 25 Bill Brubaker; 20 Lee Handley; 24 Gus Suhr; 22 Tommy Thevenow; 21 Arky Vaughan; 26 Pep Young	**Outfielders**: 17 Johnny Dickshot; 16 Woody Jensen; 12 Johnny Rizzo; 10 Lloyd Waner; 11 Paul Waner; **Other batters**: 36 Heinie Manush	**Manager**: 35 Pie Traynor; **Coaches**: 36 Jewel Ens; 34 Johnny Gooch; 33 Honus Wagner

== Player stats ==
=== Batting ===
==== Starters by position ====
Note: Pos = Position; G = Games played; AB = At bats; H = Hits; Avg. = Batting average; HR = Home runs; RBI = Runs batted in

Pos	Player	G	AB	H	Avg.	HR	RBI
C	Al Todd	133	491	130	.265	7	75
1B	Gus Suhr	145	530	156	.294	3	64
2B	Pep Young	149	562	156	.278	4	79
SS	Arky Vaughan	148	541	174	.322	7	68
3B	Lee Handley	139	570	153	.268	6	51
OF	Johnny Rizzo	143	555	167	.301	23	111
OF	Lloyd Waner	147	619	194	.313	5	57
OF	Paul Waner	148	625	175	.280	6	69

==== Other batters ====
Note: G = Games played; AB = At bats; H = Hits; Avg. = Batting average; HR = Home runs; RBI = Runs batted in

Player	G	AB	H	Avg.	HR	RBI
Woody Jensen	68	125	25	.200	0	10
Bill Brubaker	45	112	33	.295	3	19
Ray Berres	40	100	23	.230	0	6
Johnny Dickshot	29	35	8	.229	0	4
Tommy Thevenow	15	25	5	.200	0	2
Heinie Manush	15	13	4	.308	0	4

=== Pitching ===
==== Starting pitchers ====
Note: G = Games pitched; IP = Innings pitched; W = Wins; L = Losses; ERA = Earned run average; SO = Strikeouts

Player	G	IP	W	L	ERA	SO
Russ Bauers	40	243.0	13	14	3.07	117
Jim Tobin	40	241.1	14	12	3.47	70
Cy Blanton	29	172.2	11	7	3.70	80
Bob Klinger	28	159.1	12	5	2.99	58
Red Lucas	13	84.0	6	3	3.54	19

==== Other pitchers ====
Note: G = Games pitched; IP = Innings pitched; W = Wins; L = Losses; ERA = Earned run average; SO = Strikeouts

Player	G	IP	W	L	ERA	SO
Bill Swift	36	150.0	7	5	3.24	77
Ed Brandt	24	96.1	5	4	3.46	38

==== Relief pitchers ====
Note: G = Games pitched; W = Wins; L = Losses; SV = Saves; ERA = Earned run average; SO = Strikeouts

Player	G	W	L	SV	ERA	SO
Mace Brown	51	15	9	5	3.80	55
Joe Bowman	17	3	4	1	4.65	25
Rip Sewell	17	0	1	1	4.23	17
Ken Heintzelman	1	0	0	0	9.00	1

== Farm system ==
Level	Team	League	Manager
AA	Montreal Royals	International League	Rabbit Maranville and Alex Hooks
A1	Knoxville Smokies	Southern Association	Neil Caldwell
B	Savannah Indians	Sally League	Chick Autry
C	Hutchinson Larks	Western Association	Hugh McMullen
D	Carthage Pirates	Arkansas–Missouri League	Buzz Arlitt

LEAGUE CHAMPIONS: Carthage
