= 1938 St. Louis Cardinals season =

Major League Baseball season

1938 St. Louis Cardinals
- League: National League
- Ballpark: Sportsman's Park
- City: St. Louis, Missouri
- Record: 71–80 (.470)
- League place: 6th
- Owners: Sam Breadon
- General managers: Branch Rickey
- Managers: Frankie Frisch, Mike González
- Radio: KMOX (France Laux, Jim Alt); KWK (Johnny O'Hara, Allan Anthony)
- Stats: ESPN.com; Baseball Reference

The 1938 St. Louis Cardinals season was the team's 57th season in St. Louis, Missouri, United States, and the 47th season in the National League. The Cardinals went 71–80 during the season and finished sixth in the National League.

== Regular season ==
=== Season standings ===
National League
Team	W	L	Pct.	GB	Home	Road
Chicago Cubs	89	63	.586	—	44‍–‍33	45‍–‍30
Pittsburgh Pirates	86	64	.573	2	44‍–‍33	42‍–‍31
New York Giants	83	67	.553	5	43‍–‍30	40‍–‍37
Cincinnati Reds	82	68	.547	6	43‍–‍34	39‍–‍34
Boston Bees	77	75	.507	12	45‍–‍30	32‍–‍45
St. Louis Cardinals	71	80	.470	17½	36‍–‍41	35‍–‍39
Brooklyn Dodgers	69	80	.463	18½	31‍–‍41	38‍–‍39
Philadelphia Phillies	45	105	.300	43	26‍–‍48	19‍–‍57

=== Record vs. opponents ===
1938 National League record Sources:
Team	BSN	BRO	CHC	CIN	NYG	PHI	PIT	STL
Boston	—	10–12	12–10	11–9	8–14	14–8	9–13	13–9–1
Brooklyn	10–12	—	9–11–1	9–13	8–14	15–7	9–11	9–12–1
Chicago	12–10	11–9–1	—	11–11	12–10	18–4	12–10	13–9–1
Cincinnati	9–11	13–9	11–11	—	12–9	14–7	10–12	13–9–1
New York	14–8	14–8	10–12	9–12	—	16–5	9–13–1	11–9–1
Philadelphia	8–14	7–15	4–18	7–14	5–16	—	8–12–1	6–16
Pittsburgh	13–9	11–9	10–12	12–10	13–9–1	12–8–1	—	15–7
St. Louis	9–13–1	12–9–1	9–13–1	9–13–1	9–11–1	16–6	7–15	—

=== Roster ===
1938 St. Louis Cardinals
Roster
Pitchers: 17 Guy Bush; 30 Mort Cooper; 27 Curt Davis; 19 Paul Dean; 27 Ray Harrell; 31 Roy Henshaw; 12 Si Johnson; 33 Howie Krist; 32 Max Lanier; 16 Max Macon; 29 Bill McGee; 19 Preacher Roe; 19 Mike Ryba; 36 Clyde Shoun; 18 Lon Warneke; 20 Bob Weiland	Catchers: 11 Herb Bremer; 8 Mickey Owen; Infielders: 15 Jimmy Brown; 30 Jim Bucher; 24 Creepy Crespi; 5 Don Gutteridge; 6 Stu Martin; 10 Johnny Mize; 22 Lynn Myers; 17 Joe Stripp	Outfielders: 14 Frenchy Bordagaray; 17 Hal Epps; 1 Pepper Martin; 7 Joe Medwick; 2 Terry Moore; 4 Don Padgett; 9 Enos Slaughter; 34 Tuck Stainback; Other batters: 22 Dick Siebert	Manager: 3 Frankie Frisch; 25 Mike González; Coaches: 25 Mike González; 26 Buzzy Wares

== Player stats ==
= Indicates league leader

=== Batting ===
==== Starters by position ====
Note: Pos = Position; G = Games played; AB = At bats; H = Hits; Avg. = Batting average; HR = Home runs; RBI = Runs batted in

Pos	Player	G	AB	H	Avg.	HR	RBI
C	Mickey Owen	122	397	106	.267	4	36
1B	Johnny Mize	149	531	179	.337	27	102
2B	Stu Martin	114	417	116	.278	1	27
SS	Lynn Myers	70	227	55	.242	1	19
3B	Don Gutteridge	142	552	141	.255	9	64
OF	Joe Medwick	146	590	190	.322	21	122
OF	Enos Slaughter	112	395	109	.276	8	58
OF	Terry Moore	94	312	85	.272	4	21

==== Other batters ====
Note: G = Games played; AB = At bats; H = Hits; Avg. = Batting average; HR = Home runs; RBI = Runs batted in

Player	G	AB	H	Avg.	HR	RBI
Don Padgett	110	388	105	.271	8	65
Jimmy Brown	108	382	115	.301	0	38
Pepper Martin	91	269	79	.294	2	38
Joe Stripp	54	199	57	.286	0	18
Frenchy Bordagaray	81	156	44	.282	0	21
Herb Bremer	50	151	33	.219	2	14
Jim Bucher	17	57	13	.228	0	7
Hal Epps	17	50	15	.300	1	3
Creepy Crespi	7	19	5	.263	0	1
Tuck Stainback	6	10	0	.000	0	0
Dick Siebert	1	1	1	1.000	0	0

=== Pitching ===
==== Starting pitchers ====
Note: G = Games pitched; IP = Innings pitched; W = Wins; L = Losses; ERA = Earned run average; SO = Strikeouts

Player	G	IP	W	L	ERA	SO
Bob Weiland	35	228.1	16	11	3.59	117
Lon Warneke	31	197.0	13	8	3.97	89
Paul Dean	5	31.0	3	1	2.61	14
Mort Cooper	4	23.2	2	1	3.04	11

==== Other pitchers ====
Note: G = Games pitched; IP = Innings pitched; W = Wins; L = Losses; ERA = Earned run average; SO = Strikeouts

Player	G	IP	W	L	ERA	SO
Bill McGee	47	216.0	7	12	3.21	104
Curt Davis	40	173.1	12	8	3.63	36
Roy Henshaw	27	130.0	5	11	4.02	34
Max Macon	38	129.1	4	11	4.11	39
Clyde Shoun	40	117.1	6	6	4.14	37
Si Johnson	6	15.2	0	3	7.47	4

==== Relief pitchers ====
Note: G = Games pitched; W = Wins; L = Losses; SV = Saves; ERA = Earned run average; SO = Strikeouts

Player	G	W	L	SV	ERA	SO
Ray Harrell	32	2	3	1	4.86	32
Max Lanier	18	0	3	0	4.20	14
Guy Bush	6	0	1	1	4.50	1
Mike Ryba	3	1	1	0	5.40	0
Howie Krist	2	0	0	0	0.00	1
Preacher Roe	1	0	0	0	13.50	1

== Awards and honors ==
- Don Gutteridge, Ranked second in National League in triples (15)

== Farm system ==
Level	Team	League	Manager
AA	Columbus Red Birds	American Association	Burt Shotton
AA	Rochester Red Wings	International League	Ray Blades
AA	Sacramento Solons	Pacific Coast League	Bill Killefer
A1	Houston Buffaloes	Texas League	Ira Smith and Johnny Watwood
B	Cedar Rapids Raiders	Illinois–Indiana–Iowa League	Cap Crossley
B	Decatur Commodores	Illinois–Indiana–Iowa League	Tony Kaufmann
B	Asheville Tourists	Piedmont League	Hal Anderson
B	Columbus Red Birds	Sally League	George Payne
B	Mobile Shippers	Southeastern League	Marty Purtell
C	Pine Bluff Judges	Cotton States League	Leroy "Cowboy" Jones
C	Jacksonville Jax	East Texas League	Tony Robello
C	Portsmouth Red Birds	Middle Atlantic League	Benny Borgmann
C	Springfield Cardinals	Western Association	Clay Hopper
D	Union City Red Birds	Alabama–Florida League	Fred Lucas
D	Johnson City Soldiers	Appalachian League	Joe Sims and Phil Clark
D	Albuquerque Cardinals	Arizona–Texas League	Bill DeLancey
D	Monett Red Birds	Arkansas–Missouri League	Heinie Mueller
D	Martinsville Manufacturers	Bi-State League	Arnold Anderson
D	Kinston Eagles	Coastal Plain League	Tommy West
D	Cambridge Cardinals	Eastern Shore League	Joe Davis

Level	Team	League	Manager
D	New Iberia Cardinals	Evangeline League	Harrison Wickel and Jimmie Sanders
D	Daytona Beach Islanders	Florida State League	Jimmie Sanders and Harrison Wickel
D	Albany Travelers	Georgia–Florida League	Johnny Keane
D	Paducah Indians	KITTY League	Pete Mondino
D	Grand Island Cardinals	Nebraska State League	Benny Hassler
D	Shelby/Gastonia Cardinals	North Carolina State League	George Silvey
D	Caruthersville Pilots	Northeast Arkansas League	Bunny Simmons, Al Iezzi and Wilson Koewing
D	Duluth Dukes	Northern League	Dutch Dorman
D	Fostoria Red Birds	Ohio State League	Jack Farmer
D	Midland Cardinals	West Texas–New Mexico League	Fincher Withers

LEAGUE CHAMPIONS: Sacramento, Decatur, Mobile, Portsmouth, Albany, Duluth

Shelby franchise transferred to Gastonia, July 22, 1938
