= 1938 Chicago Cubs season =

1938 Chicago Cubs
- National League champions
- League: National League
- Ballpark: Wrigley Field
- City: Chicago
- Record: 89–63 (.586)
- League place: 1st
- Owners: Philip K. Wrigley
- General managers: Charles Weber
- Managers: Charlie Grimm, Gabby Hartnett
- Radio: WGN (Bob Elson); WBBM (Charlie Grimm, Pat Flanagan, Val Sherman); WCFL (Hal Totten); WIND (Russ Hodges, Jimmy Dudley); WJJD (John Harrington, Jack Drees)

The 1938 Chicago Cubs season was the 67th season of the Chicago Cubs franchise, the 63rd in the National League and the 23rd at Wrigley Field. The Cubs finished first in the National League with a record of 89–63. The team was swept four games to none by the New York Yankees in the World Series.

The team is known for the season of pitcher Dizzy Dean. While pitching for the NL in the 1937 All-Star Game, Dean suffered a big toe fracture. Coming back too soon from the injury, Dean changed his pitching motion to avoid landing too hard on his sore toe enough to affect his mechanics. As a result, he hurt his arm, losing his great fastball. By 1938, Dean's arm was largely gone. Cubs scout Clarence "Pants" Rowland was tasked with the unenviable job of obeying owner Philip K. Wrigley's direct order to buy a washed-up Dean's contract at any cost. Rowland signed the ragged righty for $185,000, one of the most expensive loss-leader contracts in baseball history. Dean still helped the Cubs win the 1938 pennant.

On July 20, Wrigley named 37-year-old Gabby Hartnett as the team's player-manager, replacing Charlie Grimm. When Hartnett took over, the Cubs were in third place, six games behind the first place Pittsburgh Pirates who were led by Pie Traynor. By September 27, with one week left in the season, the Cubs had battled back to within a game and a half game of the Pirates in the National League standings as the two teams met for a crucial three-game series. Dean pitched the opening game of the series and with his ailing arm, relied more on his experience and grit to defeat the Pirates by a score of 2 to 1. Dean would later call it the greatest outing of his career. The Cubs cut the Pirates' lead to a half game and set the stage for one of baseball's most memorable moments.

On September 28, the two teams met for the second game of the series, where Hartnett experienced the highlight of his career. With darkness descending on the lightless Wrigley Field and the score tied at 5 runs apiece, the umpires ruled that the ninth inning would be the last to be played. The entire game would have to be replayed the following day if the score remained tied. Hartnett came to bat with two out in the bottom of the ninth inning. With a count of 0 balls and 2 strikes, Hartnett connected on a Mace Brown pitch, launching the ball into the darkness, before it eventually landed in the left-center field bleachers. The stadium erupted into pandemonium as players and fans stormed the field to escort Hartnett around the bases. Hartnett's walk-off home run became immortalized as the Homer in the Gloamin'. The Cubs were now in first place, culminating a 19–3–1 record in September, and the pennant would be clinched three days later.

It would be 50 years before lights were installed at Wrigley Field.

== Regular season ==
=== Season standings ===
National League
Team	W	L	Pct.	GB	Home	Road
Chicago Cubs	89	63	.586	—	44‍–‍33	45‍–‍30
Pittsburgh Pirates	86	64	.573	2	44‍–‍33	42‍–‍31
New York Giants	83	67	.553	5	43‍–‍30	40‍–‍37
Cincinnati Reds	82	68	.547	6	43‍–‍34	39‍–‍34
Boston Bees	77	75	.507	12	45‍–‍30	32‍–‍45
St. Louis Cardinals	71	80	.470	17½	36‍–‍41	35‍–‍39
Brooklyn Dodgers	69	80	.463	18½	31‍–‍41	38‍–‍39
Philadelphia Phillies	45	105	.300	43	26‍–‍48	19‍–‍57

=== Record vs. opponents ===
1938 National League record Sources:
Team	BSN	BRO	CHC	CIN	NYG	PHI	PIT	STL
Boston	—	10–12	12–10	11–9	8–14	14–8	9–13	13–9–1
Brooklyn	10–12	—	9–11–1	9–13	8–14	15–7	9–11	9–12–1
Chicago	12–10	11–9–1	—	11–11	12–10	18–4	12–10	13–9–1
Cincinnati	9–11	13–9	11–11	—	12–9	14–7	10–12	13–9–1
New York	14–8	14–8	10–12	9–12	—	16–5	9–13–1	11–9–1
Philadelphia	8–14	7–15	4–18	7–14	5–16	—	8–12–1	6–16
Pittsburgh	13–9	11–9	10–12	12–10	13–9–1	12–8–1	—	15–7
St. Louis	9–13–1	12–9–1	9–13–1	9–13–1	9–11–1	16–6	7–15	—

=== Roster ===
1938 Chicago Cubs
Roster
Pitchers: 18 Clay Bryant; 16 Tex Carleton; 22 Dizzy Dean; 56 Al Epperly; 14 Larry French; 29 Kirby Higbe; 26,32 Newt Kimball; 11 Bill Lee; 41 Bob Logan; 41 Vance Page; 17 Charlie Root; 28 Jack Russell	Catchers: 39 Bob Garbark; 2 Gabby Hartnett; 12 Ken O'Dea; Infielders: 3 Ripper Collins; 6 Stan Hack; 4 Billy Herman; 5 Billy Jurges; 15 Tony Lazzeri; 29 Bobby Mattick; 21 Steve Mesner	Outfielders: 30 Jim Asbell; 23 Phil Cavarretta; 9 Frank Demaree; 7 Augie Galan; 8 Joe Marty; 43 Carl Reynolds; 32 Coaker Triplett	Manager: 1 Charlie Grimm; 2 Gabby Hartnett; Coaches: 19 Red Corriden; 2 Gabby Hartnett; 20 Roy Johnson; 15 Tony Lazzeri

=== Schedule ===
1938 Chicago Cubs game log
April

#	Date	Opponent	Score	Win	Loss	Save	Attendance	Record
1	April 19	@Reds	8–7	Grimm (1–0)	McKechnie (0–1)	Logan (1)	34,148	1–0

== Player stats ==
= Indicates team leader

= Indicates league leader

=== Batting ===
==== Starters by position ====
Note: Pos = Position; G = Games played; AB = At bats; H = Hits; Avg. = Batting average; HR = Home runs; RBI = Runs batted in

Pos	Player	G	AB	H	Avg.	HR	RBI
C	Gabby Hartnett	88	299	82	.274	10	59
1B	Ripper Collins	143	490	131	.267	13	61
2B	Billy Herman	152	624	173	.277	1	56
SS	Billy Jurges	137	465	114	.245	1	47
3B	Stan Hack	152	609	195	.320	4	67
OF	Carl Reynolds	125	497	150	.302	3	67
OF	Augie Galan	110	395	113	.286	6	69
OF	Frank Demaree	129	476	130	.273	8	62

==== Other batters ====
Note: G = Games played; AB = At bats; H = Hits; Avg. = Batting average; HR = Home runs; RBI = Runs batted in

Player	G	AB	H	Avg.	HR	RBI
Phil Cavarretta	92	268	64	.239	1	28
Ken O'Dea	86	247	65	.263	3	33
Joe Marty	76	235	57	.243	7	35
Tony Lazzeri	54	120	32	.267	5	23
Bob Garbark	23	54	14	.259	0	5
Coaker Triplett	12	36	9	.250	0	2
Jim Asbell	17	33	6	.182	0	3
Steve Mesner	2	4	1	.250	0	0
Bobby Mattick	1	1	1	1.000	0	1

=== Pitching ===
==== Starting pitchers ====
Note: G = Games pitched; IP = Innings pitched; W = Wins; L = Losses; ERA = Earned run average; SO = Strikeouts

Player	G	IP	W	L	ERA	SO
Bill Lee	44	291.0	22	9	2.66	121
Clay Bryant	44	270.1	19	11	3.10	135
Larry French	43	201.1	10	19	3.80	83
Tex Carleton	33	167.2	10	9	5.42	80
Dizzy Dean	13	74.2	7	1	1.81	22
Kirby Higbe	2	10.0	0	0	5.40	4

==== Other pitchers ====
Note: G = Games pitched; IP = Innings pitched; W = Wins; L = Losses; ERA = Earned run average; SO = Strikeouts

Player	G	IP	W	L	ERA	SO
Charlie Root	44	160.2	8	7	2.86	70
Vance Page	13	68.0	5	4	3.84	18
Al Epperly	9	27.0	2	0	3.67	10

==== Relief pitchers ====
Note: G = Games pitched; W = Wins; L = Losses; SV = Saves; ERA = Earned run average; SO = Strikeouts

Player	G	W	L	SV	ERA	SO
Jack Russell	42	6	1	3	3.34	29
Bob Logan	14	0	2	2	2.78	10
Newt Kimball	1	0	0	0	9.00	1

== 1938 World Series ==
=== Game 1 ===
October 5, 1938 at Wrigley Field (Chicago)
Team	1	2	3	4	5	6	7	8	9	R	H	E
New York (A)	0	2	0	0	0	1	0	0	0	3	12	1
Chicago (N)	0	0	1	0	0	0	0	0	0	1	9	1
WP: Red Ruffing (1–0) LP: Bill Lee (0–1)

=== Game 2 ===
October 6, 1938 at Wrigley Field (Chicago)
Team	1	2	3	4	5	6	7	8	9	R	H	E
New York (A)	0	2	0	0	0	0	0	2	2	6	7	2
Chicago (N)	1	0	2	0	0	0	0	0	0	3	11	0
WP: Lefty Gomez (1–0) LP: Dizzy Dean (0–1) Sv: Johnny Murphy (1); Home runs: Away: Frankie Crosetti (1), Joe DiMaggio (1); Home: None

=== Game 3 ===
October 8, 1938 at Yankee Stadium (New York City)
Team	1	2	3	4	5	6	7	8	9	R	H	E
Chicago (N)	0	0	0	0	1	0	0	1	0	2	5	1
New York (A)	0	0	0	0	2	2	0	1	x	5	7	2
WP: Monte Pearson (1–0) LP: Clay Bryant (0–1); Home runs: Away: Joe Marty (1); Home: Joe Gordon (1), Bill Dickey (1)

=== Game 4 ===
October 9, 1938 at Yankee Stadium (New York City)
Team	1	2	3	4	5	6	7	8	9	R	H	E
Chicago (N)	0	0	0	1	0	0	0	2	0	3	8	1
New York (A)	0	3	0	0	0	1	0	4	x	8	11	1
WP: Red Ruffing (2–0) LP: Bill Lee (0–2); Home runs: Away: Ken O'Dea (1); Home: Tommy Henrich (1)

== Farm system ==
Level	Team	League	Manager
AA	Los Angeles Angels	Pacific Coast League	Truck Hannah
A1	Birmingham Barons	Southern Association	Fresco Thompson
B	Moline Plowboys	Illinois–Indiana–Iowa League	Mike Gazella
B	Portsmouth Cubs	Piedmont League	Dick Luckey
C	Helena Seaporters	Cotton States League	Riggs Stephenson
C	Hot Springs Bathers	Cotton States League	Spike Hunter
C	Ponca City Angels	Western Association	Goldie Holt
D	Greeneville Burley Cubs	Appalachian League	Sam Alexander
D	Bisbee Bees	Arizona–Texas League	Charlie Mogli
D	Eau Claire Bears	Northern League	Ed Garrity

LEAGUE CHAMPIONS: Ponca City, Greeneville
