= Pitko =

Pitko is a surname. Notable people with the surname include:

- Alex Pitko (1914–2011), American baseball player
- Janne Pitko (born 1981), Finnish curler and professional poker player
- Jenni Pitko (born 1986), Finnish politician
