= Oscar Georgy =

American baseball player (1916-1999)

- Pitcher
- Born: November 25, 1916; New Orleans, Louisiana, U.S.
- Died: January 15, 1999 (aged 82); New Orleans, Louisiana, U.S.
- Batted: Right Threw: Right

MLB debut
- June 4, 1938, for the New York Giants

Last MLB appearance
- June 4, 1938, for the New York Giants

MLB statistics
- Games pitched: 1
- Innings pitched: 1
- Win–loss record: 0–0
- Earned run average: 18.00
- Strikeouts: 0
- Stats at Baseball Reference

Teams
- New York Giants (1938)

Oscar John Georgy (November 25, 1916 – January 15, 1999) was an American Major League Baseball pitcher who played in one game for the New York Giants on June 4, 1938. He pitched in one inning in relief, allowing two earned runs in the Giants' 2–11 loss to the Cincinnati Reds at Crosley Field.
