= 1938 New York Giants (MLB) season =

1938 New York Giants
- League: National League
- Ballpark: Polo Grounds
- City: New York City
- Record: 83–67 (.553)
- League place: 3rd
- Owners: Horace Stoneham
- General managers: Bill Terry
- Managers: Bill Terry

The 1938 New York Giants season was the franchise's 56th season. The team finished in third place in the National League with an 83–67 record, 5 games behind the Chicago Cubs.

== Offseason ==
- December 1, 1937: Ed Madjeski was purchased from the Giants by the Louisville Colonels.

== Regular season ==
=== Season standings ===
National League
Team	W	L	Pct.	GB	Home	Road
Chicago Cubs	89	63	.586	—	44‍–‍33	45‍–‍30
Pittsburgh Pirates	86	64	.573	2	44‍–‍33	42‍–‍31
New York Giants	83	67	.553	5	43‍–‍30	40‍–‍37
Cincinnati Reds	82	68	.547	6	43‍–‍34	39‍–‍34
Boston Bees	77	75	.507	12	45‍–‍30	32‍–‍45
St. Louis Cardinals	71	80	.470	17½	36‍–‍41	35‍–‍39
Brooklyn Dodgers	69	80	.463	18½	31‍–‍41	38‍–‍39
Philadelphia Phillies	45	105	.300	43	26‍–‍48	19‍–‍57

=== Record vs. opponents ===
1938 National League record Sources:
Team	BSN	BRO	CHC	CIN	NYG	PHI	PIT	STL
Boston	—	10–12	12–10	11–9	8–14	14–8	9–13	13–9–1
Brooklyn	10–12	—	9–11–1	9–13	8–14	15–7	9–11	9–12–1
Chicago	12–10	11–9–1	—	11–11	12–10	18–4	12–10	13–9–1
Cincinnati	9–11	13–9	11–11	—	12–9	14–7	10–12	13–9–1
New York	14–8	14–8	10–12	9–12	—	16–5	9–13–1	11–9–1
Philadelphia	8–14	7–15	4–18	7–14	5–16	—	8–12–1	6–16
Pittsburgh	13–9	11–9	10–12	12–10	13–9–1	12–8–1	—	15–7
St. Louis	9–13–1	12–9–1	9–13–1	9–13–1	9–11–1	16–6	7–15	—

=== Opening Day lineup ===
- 1 Jo-Jo Moore
- 2 Dick Bartell
- 3 Jimmy Ripple
- 4 Mel Ott
- 5 Hank Leiber
- 6 Johnny McCarthy
- 26 Lou Chiozza
- 9 Harry Danning
- 16 Cliff Melton

=== Roster ===
1938 New York Giants
Roster
Pitchers: 29 Tom Baker; 24 Jumbo Brown; 15 Slick Castleman; 14 Dick Coffman; 18 Oscar Georgy; 10 Harry Gumbert; 11 Carl Hubbell; 12 Bill Lohrman; 16 Cliff Melton; 17 Hal Schumacher; 18 Hy Vandenberg; 23 Johnnie Wittig	Catchers: 9 Harry Danning; 8 Gus Mancuso; Infielders: 2 Dick Bartell; 26 Lou Chiozza; 22 Bill Cissell; 19 Mickey Haslin; 7 Alex Kampouris; 20 Sam Leslie; 6 Johnny McCarthy; 7 George Myatt; 4 Mel Ott; 22 Blondy Ryan	Outfielders: 21 Wally Berger; 5 Hank Leiber; 1 Jo-Jo Moore; 3 Jimmy Ripple; 19 Bob Seeds; Other batters: 28 Les Powers	Manager: 30 Bill Terry; Coaches: 31 Tommy Clarke; 32 Frank Snyder

== Player stats ==
= Indicates league leader

=== Batting ===
==== Starters by position ====
Note: Pos = Position; G = Games played; AB = At bats; H = Hits; Avg. = Batting average; HR = Home runs; RBI = Runs batted in

Pos	Player	G	AB	H	Avg.	HR	RBI
C	Harry Danning	120	448	137	.306	9	60
1B	Johnny McCarthy	134	470	128	.272	8	59
2B	Alex Kampouris	82	268	66	.246	5	37
SS	Dick Bartell	127	481	126	.262	9	49
3B	Mel Ott	150	527	164	.311	36	116
OF	Jimmy Ripple	134	501	131	.261	10	60
OF	Jo-Jo Moore	125	506	153	.302	11	56
OF	Hank Leiber	98	360	97	.269	12	65

==== Other batters ====
Note: G = Games played; AB = At bats; H = Hits; Avg. = Batting average; HR = Home runs; RBI = Runs batted in

Player	G	AB	H	Avg.	HR	RBI
Bob Seeds	81	296	86	.291	9	52
Lou Chiozza	57	179	42	.235	3	17
George Myatt	43	170	52	.306	3	10
Gus Mancuso	52	158	55	.348	2	15
Sam Leslie	76	154	39	.253	1	16
Bill Cissell	38	149	40	.268	2	18
Mickey Haslin	31	102	33	.324	3	15
Wally Berger	16	32	6	.188	0	4
Blondy Ryan	12	24	5	.208	0	0
Les Powers	2	3	0	.000	0	0

=== Pitching ===
==== Starting pitchers ====
Note: G = Games pitched; IP = Innings pitched; W = Wins; L = Losses; ERA = Earned run average; SO = Strikeouts

Player	G	IP	W	L	ERA	SO
Cliff Melton	36	243.0	14	14	3.89	101
Harry Gumbert	38	235.2	15	13	4.01	84
Hal Schumacher	28	185.0	13	8	3.50	54
Carl Hubbell	24	179.0	13	10	3.07	104

==== Other pitchers ====
Note: G = Games pitched; IP = Innings pitched; W = Wins; L = Losses; ERA = Earned run average; SO = Strikeouts

Player	G	IP	W	L	ERA	SO
Bill Lohrman	31	152.0	9	6	3.32	52
Slick Castleman	21	90.2	4	5	4.17	18
Johnnie Wittig	13	39.1	2	3	4.81	14
Hy Vandenberg	6	18.0	0	1	7.50	7

==== Relief pitchers ====
Note: G = Games pitched; W = Wins; L = Losses; SV = Saves; ERA = Earned run average; SO = Strikeouts

Player	G	W	L	SV	ERA	SO
Dick Coffman	51	8	4	12	3.48	21
Jumbo Brown	43	5	3	5	1.80	42
Tom Baker	2	0	0	0	6.75	0
Oscar Georgy	1	0	0	0	18.00	0

== Farm system ==
Level	Team	League	Manager
AA	Jersey City Giants	International League	Travis Jackson and Hank DeBerry
B	Richmond Colts	Piedmont League	Lance Richbourg
C	Fort Smith Giants	Western Association	Frank Brazill
D	Milford Giants	Eastern Shore League	Val Picinich
D	Blytheville Giants	Northeast Arkansas League	Herschel Bobo

LEAGUE CHAMPIONS: Blytheville
