= Dykes Potter =

American baseball player (1910–2002)

- Pitcher
- Born: November 18, 1910; Ashland, Kentucky, U.S.
- Died: February 27, 2002 (aged 91); Greenup, Kentucky, U.S.
- Batted: Right Threw: Right

MLB debut
- April 26, 1938, for the Brooklyn Dodgers

Last MLB appearance
- May 2, 1938, for the Brooklyn Dodgers

MLB statistics
- Win–loss record: 0–0
- Earned run average: 4.50
- Strikeouts: 1
- Stats at Baseball Reference

Teams
- Brooklyn Dodgers (1938)

Maryland Dykes Potter (November 18, 1910 – February 27, 2002) was an American professional baseball pitcher. He played in two Major League Baseball (MLB) games, for the 1938 Brooklyn Dodgers.

== Biography ==
Potter's professional baseball career spanned 1931–1941. He played in the farm system of the St. Louis Cardinals from 1932 to 1937, then in the Brooklyn Dodgers organization from 1938 to 1941. In 11 minor-league seasons, he compiled a 140–97 win–loss record. He mostly played at the lower levels, Class B (114 games) and Class C (145 games).

Potter made his major-league debut on April 26, 1938, pitching a scoreless eighth inning in the Dodgers' 4–1 loss to the Boston Bees. His final major-league appearance came six days later on May 2—again appearing in relief, he surrendered an inside-the-park home run to the first batter he faced, Jo-Jo Moore, in one inning of work in a 7–4 loss to the New York Giants. The only major-league strikeout that Potter recorded was against future Baseball Hall of Fame inductee Mel Ott.

His brother, Squire Potter, pitched in one game for the Washington Senators in 1923.
