= John Gaddy =

American baseball player (1914-1966)

- Pitcher
- Born: February 5, 1914; Wadesboro, North Carolina, U.S.
- Died: May 3, 1966 (aged 52); Albemarle, North Carolina, U.S.
- Batted: Right Threw: Right

MLB debut
- September 27, 1938, for the Brooklyn Dodgers

Last MLB appearance
- October 2, 1938, for the Brooklyn Dodgers

MLB statistics
- Win–loss record: 2–0
- Earned run average: 0.69
- Strikeouts: 3
- Stats at Baseball Reference

Teams
- Brooklyn Dodgers (1938)

John Wilson Gaddy (February 5, 1914 – May 3, 1966), nicknamed "Sheriff", was an American professional baseball player who played pitcher in the Major Leagues (MLB) for the Brooklyn Dodgers. He was the starting pitcher in two games for the Dodgers during the final week of the 1938 season.

Gaddy pitched 4 innings in his MLB debut on September 27 debut to earn the victory, 5–1, in the second game of a doubleheader over the New York Giants at Ebbets Field. His other victory came in the final game of the season, pitching a complete game as the Dodgers defeated the Philadelphia Phillies, 7–2, at Shibe Park on October 2.

Gaddy died in an automobile accident in Albemarle, North Carolina.
