= Tom Lanning =

American baseball player

- Pitcher
- Born: April 22, 1907; Biltmore, North Carolina, U.S.
- Died: November 4, 1967 (aged 60); Marietta, Georgia, U.S.
- Batted: Left Threw: Left

MLB debut
- September 14, 1938, for the Philadelphia Phillies

Last MLB appearance
- October 2, 1938, for the Philadelphia Phillies

MLB statistics
- Win–loss record: 0–1
- Earned run average: 6.43
- Strikeouts: 2
- Stats at Baseball Reference

Teams
- Philadelphia Phillies (1938)

Thomas Newton Lanning (April 22, 1907 – November 4, 1967) was an American professional baseball player. He was a left-handed pitcher for one season (1938) with the Philadelphia Phillies. For his career, he compiled a 0–1 record, with a 6.43 earned run average, and two strikeouts in seven innings pitched.

A single in his only at-bat left Lanning with a rare MLB career batting average of 1.000. His only decision came in the same game when the Phillies lost to the Brooklyn Dodgers, 8–1, on September 24, 1938.

An alumnus of Wake Forest University, Lanning was born in Biltmore, North Carolina, and died in Marietta, Georgia, at the age of 60.

Lanning's younger brother, Johnny, was also an MLB pitcher.
