= Johnny Lanning =

American baseball player (1910–1989)

- Pitcher
- Born: September 6, 1910; Asheville, North Carolina, U.S.
- Died: November 8, 1989 (aged 79); Asheville, North Carolina, U.S.
- Batted: Right Threw: Right

MLB debut
- April 17, 1936, for the Boston Bees

Last MLB appearance
- May 12, 1947, for the Boston Braves

MLB statistics
- Win–loss record: 58–60
- Earned run average: 3.58
- Strikeouts: 295
- Stats at Baseball Reference

Teams
- Boston Bees (1936–1939); Pittsburgh Pirates (1940–1943, 1945–1946); Boston Braves (1947)

John Young Lanning (September 6, 1910 – November 8, 1989) was an American professional baseball pitcher. He played in Major League Baseball (MLB) from 1936 to 1947 for the Boston Bees, Pittsburgh Pirates, and Boston Braves. Lanning's main pitches were a hard curve and a slow curve.

Lanning attended North Carolina State College, where he played college baseball for the Wolfpack.

During World War II, Lanning served in the US Army.

Lanning's older brother, Tom, was a pitcher for the Philadelphia Phillies.
