= 1938 Cincinnati Reds season =

1938 Cincinnati Reds
- League: National League
- Ballpark: Crosley Field
- City: Cincinnati
- Owners: Powel Crosley Jr.
- General managers: Warren Giles
- Managers: Bill McKechnie
- Radio: WCPO (Harry Hartman); WSAI (Red Barber, Dick Bray)

The 1938 Cincinnati Reds season was a season in American baseball. The team finished fourth in the National League with a record of 82–68, 6 games behind the Chicago Cubs.

== Offseason ==
During the off-season, Cincinnati hired Bill McKechnie to manage the club. McKechnie had extensive major league experience as a manager, as he most recently managed the Boston Bees from 1930 to 1937, leading the club to a 560–666 over eight seasons. McKechnie also managed the St. Louis Cardinals from 1928 to 1929, leading the team to a 129–88 record and winning the 1928 National League pennant. McKechnie had his most success as manager with the Pittsburgh Pirates from 1922 to 1926, as he earned a 409–293 record. McKechnie managed the Pirates to the 1925 National League pennant, and won the 1925 World Series as Pittsburgh defeated the Washington Senators in seven games.

On October 4, 1937, the Reds released outfielder Kiki Cuyler following the 1937 season. Cuyler spent three seasons in Cincinnati, where he batted .293 with nine home runs, 128 RBI and 30 stolen bases in 323 games.

The Reds sold centerfielder Hub Walker to the Nashville Volunteers of the Southern Association on December 2. In 78 games with the Reds in 1937, Walker hit .249 with one home run and 19 RBI.

The next day, on December 3, the Reds were involved in a trade with the New York Yankees. Cincinnati sent shortstop Eddie Miller and $40,000 to New York for catcher Willard Hershberger. Hershberger batted .325 with five home runs in 96 games with the Newark Bears of the International League during the 1937 season. Following the acquisition of Hershberger, the Reds sold catcher Gilly Campbell to the Montreal Royals of the International League three days later.

On February 3, the Reds released pitcher Bill Hallahan. Hallahan struggled to a 3–9 record with a 6.14 ERA in 21 games with the Reds during the 1937 season.

The next day, on February 4, Cincinnati purchased second baseman Lonny Frey from the Chicago Cubs. Frey hit .278 with one home run and 22 RBI in 78 games during his only season with Chicago. Previously, Frey played with the Brooklyn Dodgers from 1933 to 1936, where in his best season in 1935, Frey hit .262 with 11 home runs and 77 RBI in 131 games.

In mid-April, the Reds signed pitcher Ray Benge as a free agent. Benge did not play during the 1937 season. In the 1936 season, he earned a record of 8–13 with a 5.49 ERA in 36 games while splitting the season between the Boston Bees and the Philadelphia Phillies. In 1931, Benge enjoyed his best season, as he earned a 14–18 record with a 3.17 ERA in 38 games with the Phillies.

== Regular season ==
On April 19, the Reds opened the 1938 season with a loss to the Chicago Cubs by a score of 8–7 in front of 34,148 fans at Crosley Field. Ernie Lombardi went 3-for-3 for the Reds, while Billy Myers went 3-for-4, while driving in three runs.

The Reds purchased pitcher Jim Weaver from the St. Louis Browns on April 25. Weaver had a 0–1 record with an ERA of 9.00 in one game with the Browns. In 1935 with the Pittsburgh Pirates, Weaver finished tied for the National League lead with four shutouts.

Following a 3–8 start of the season in their first 11 games, Cincinnati would win six of their next seven games, bringing their record to .500 at 9–9 through 18 games. The Reds would stay hot throughout the month of May, as the club finished the month with a record of 15–9, which brought their overall win-loss record to 19–17 heading into June, as the club sat in fourth place in the National League.

On June 6, the Reds acquired outfielder Wally Berger from the New York Giants in exchange for infielder Alex Kampouris. Berger struggled with the Giants in 1938, hitting only .188 with four RBI in 16 games. Earlier in his career, Berger was one of the top sluggers in the National League. In 1930, he set the record for most home runs by a rookie with 38 when he played for the Boston Braves. In the 1933 season, Berger finished in third place in National League MVP voting after he hit .313 with 27 home runs and 106 RBI in 137 games with the Braves. In 1935, Berger led the National League with 34 home runs and 130 RBI.

Johnny Vander Meer became the only pitcher in major league history to pitch two consecutive no-hitters in 1938. On June 11, 1938, he no-hit the Boston Bees at Crosley Field. Four nights later, in the first night game played at Ebbets Field, he no-hit the Brooklyn Dodgers. One of two balls that survives from this historic game is in the Seth Swirsky collection. After his double no-hit achievement, Reds' management wanted Vander Meer to change his uniform number to "00." He politely refused.

On June 13, the Reds were involved in a blockbuster trade, as the team acquired pitcher Bucky Walters from the Philadelphia Phillies in exchange for catcher Spud Davis, pitcher Al Hollingsworth and $50,000. Walters struggled to begin the 1938 season with the Phillies, posting a record of 4–8 with a 5.23 ERA in 12 starts, pitching 82.2 innings and nine complete games.

Cincinnati had a very solid record of 15–10 in the month of June, bringing their overall win-loss record to 35–27 by the end of the month, sitting in a second place tie with the Pittsburgh Pirates, only four games behind the pennant leading New York Giants.

The Reds started off the month of July with a four-game losing streak, which dropped the team into fourth place in the National League and eight games behind the Giants. Cincinnati rebounded from this streak, winning their next seven games, however, the streaky Reds then dropped four games in a row following their winning streak. Overall, Cincinnati had a 15–15 record during the month, as their overall record was 50–42 by the end of July, as they were in fourth place, 8.5 games out of first.

Cincinnati put together a record of 18–14 during the month of August, bumping the club from fourth place into second by the end of the month with an overall record of 68–56, however, the Reds sat 6.5 games behind the pennant leading Pittsburgh Pirates.

The Reds were never able to catch New York for first place, as the team put together a record of 14–12 in their remaining 26 games, dropping the Reds to fourth place in the National League, as Cincinnati finished six games behind the pennant winning Chicago Cubs.

Offensively, outfield Ival Goodman led the club, as he hit .292 with a team leading 30 home runs, and drove in 92 runners in 145 games. Catcher Ernie Lombardi led Cincinnati with a .342 batting average, while he hit 19 home runs and had 95 RBI in 129 games. First baseman Frank McCormick led the Reds with 109 RBI, as he hit .327 and had five home runs in 151 games played. Outfielder Wally Berger, who the Reds acquired in a trade during the season, hit .306 with 16 home runs and 56 RBI in 99 games with the Reds.

The Reds pitching staff was anchored by Paul Derringer, as he led the club with a 21–14 record and a 2.93 ERA in 41 games. Derringer led Cincinnati with 26 complete games, four shutouts, 307 innings pitched, and struck out 132 batters. Johnny Vander Meer had an unforgettable season, throwing back-to-back no-hitters. He posted a record of 15–10 with a 3.12 ERA in 32 games. Bucky Walters posted a record of 11–6 and an ERA of 3.69 in 168.1 innings pitched following his trade to Cincinnati during the season.

The Reds 82–68 record in 1938 was a 26 win improvement over the 1937 season, in which the club finished in last place with a 56–98 record. The 1938 season was the first time Cincinnati finished over .500 since the 1928 season, when the club finished 78–74. The Reds 82 victories was their highest total since the 1926 season, when the Reds finished 87–67. Cincinnati set a club record in attendance, as the team drew 706,756 fans, an improvement of 295,535 from 1937. The Reds previously record high for attendance was in 1926 as the club drew 672,987 fans.

=== Season standings ===
National League
Team	W	L	Pct.	GB	Home	Road
Chicago Cubs	89	63	.586	—	44‍–‍33	45‍–‍30
Pittsburgh Pirates	86	64	.573	2	44‍–‍33	42‍–‍31
New York Giants	83	67	.553	5	43‍–‍30	40‍–‍37
Cincinnati Reds	82	68	.547	6	43‍–‍34	39‍–‍34
Boston Bees	77	75	.507	12	45‍–‍30	32‍–‍45
St. Louis Cardinals	71	80	.470	17½	36‍–‍41	35‍–‍39
Brooklyn Dodgers	69	80	.463	18½	31‍–‍41	38‍–‍39
Philadelphia Phillies	45	105	.300	43	26‍–‍48	19‍–‍57

=== Record vs. opponents ===
1938 National League record Sources:
Team	BSN	BRO	CHC	CIN	NYG	PHI	PIT	STL
Boston	—	10–12	12–10	11–9	8–14	14–8	9–13	13–9–1
Brooklyn	10–12	—	9–11–1	9–13	8–14	15–7	9–11	9–12–1
Chicago	12–10	11–9–1	—	11–11	12–10	18–4	12–10	13–9–1
Cincinnati	9–11	13–9	11–11	—	12–9	14–7	10–12	13–9–1
New York	14–8	14–8	10–12	9–12	—	16–5	9–13–1	11–9–1
Philadelphia	8–14	7–15	4–18	7–14	5–16	—	8–12–1	6–16
Pittsburgh	13–9	11–9	10–12	12–10	13–9–1	12–8–1	—	15–7
St. Louis	9–13–1	12–9–1	9–13–1	9–13–1	9–11–1	16–6	7–15	—

=== Roster ===
1938 Cincinnati Reds
Roster
Pitchers: 61 Red Barrett; 46 Ray Benge; 58 Joe Cascarella; 55 Peaches Davis; 52 Paul Derringer; 53 Lee Grissom; 56 Al Hollingsworth; 59 Ted Kleinhans; 60 Whitey Moore; 54 Gene Schott; 57 Johnny Vander Meer; 56 Bucky Walters; 63 Jim Weaver	Catchers: 36 Spud Davis; 50 Willard Hershberger; 35 Ernie Lombardi; Infielders: 47 Lonny Frey; 38 Alex Kampouris; 46,51 Don Lang; 37 Frank McCormick; 39 Billy Myers; 45 Nolen Richardson; 40 Lew Riggs; 35 Justin Stein	Outfielders: 62 Wally Berger; 49 Nino Bongiovanni; 42 Dusty Cooke; 44 Harry Craft; 48 Kiddo Davis; 43 Lee Gamble; 41 Ival Goodman; Other batters: 45 Buck Jordan; 51 Jimmy Outlaw; 59 Dick West	Manager: 65 Bill McKechnie; Coaches: 66 Hank Gowdy; 67 Edd Roush

== Player stats ==
= Indicates team leader

= Indicates league leader

=== Batting ===
==== Starters by position ====
Note: Pos = Position; G = Games played; AB = At bats; H = Hits; Avg. = Batting average; HR = Home runs; RBI = Runs batted in

Pos	Player	G	AB	H	Avg.	HR	RBI
C	Ernie Lombardi	129	489	167	.342	19	95
1B	Frank McCormick	151	640	209	.327	5	106
2B	Lonny Frey	124	501	133	.265	4	36
SS	Billy Myers	134	442	112	.253	12	47
3B	Lew Riggs	142	531	134	.252	2	55
OF	Ival Goodman	145	568	166	.292	30	92
OF	Harry Craft	151	612	165	.270	15	83
OF	Wally Berger	99	407	125	.307	16	56

==== Other batters ====
Note: G = Games played; AB = At bats; H = Hits; Avg. = Batting average; HR = Home runs; RBI = Runs batted in

Player	G	AB	H	Avg.	HR	RBI
Dusty Cooke	82	233	64	.275	2	33
Willard Hershberger	49	105	29	.276	0	12
Nolen Richardson	35	100	29	.290	0	10
Lee Gamble	53	75	24	.320	0	5
Alex Kampouris	21	74	19	.257	2	7
Don Lang	21	50	13	.220	1	11
Spud Davis	12	36	6	.167	0	1
Kiddo Davis	5	18	5	.278	0	0
Justin Stein	11	18	6	.333	0	1
Buck Jordan	9	7	2	.286	0	0
Nino Bongiovanni	2	7	2	.286	0	0
Dick West	1	1	0	.000	0	0
Jimmy Outlaw	4	0	0	----	0	0

=== Pitching ===
==== Starting pitchers ====
Note: G = Games pitched; IP = Innings pitched; W = Wins; L = Losses; ERA = Earned run average; SO = Strikeouts

Player	G	IP	W	L	ERA	SO
Paul Derringer	41	307.0	21	14	2.93	132
Johnny Vander Meer	32	225.1	15	10	3.12	125
Bucky Walters	27	168.1	11	6	3.69	65
Peaches Davis	29	167.2	7	12	3.97	28

==== Other pitchers ====
Note: G = Games pitched; IP = Innings pitched; W = Wins; L = Losses; ERA = Earned run average; SO = Strikeouts

Player	G	IP	W	L	ERA	SO
Jim Weaver	30	129.1	6	4	3.13	64
Whitey Moore	19	90.1	6	4	3.49	38
Lee Grissom	14	51.0	2	3	5.29	16
Al Hollingsworth	9	34.0	2	2	7.15	13
Red Barrett	6	28.2	2	0	3.14	5

==== Relief pitchers ====
Note: G = Games pitched; W = Wins; L = Losses; SV = Saves; ERA = Earned run average; SO = Strikeouts

Player	G	W	L	SV	ERA	SO
Joe Cascarella	33	4	7	4	4.57	30
Gene Schott	31	5	5	2	4.45	21
Ray Benge	9	1	1	2	4.11	5
Ted Kleinhans	1	0	0	0	9.00	0

== Farm system ==
Level	Team	League	Manager
AA	Syracuse Chiefs	International League	Jim Bottomley and Dick Porter
A	Albany Senators	Eastern League	Bill McCorry
B	Durham Bulls	Piedmont League	Bill Hughes
B	Columbia Reds	Sally League	Johnny Burnett
B	Waterloo Red Hawks	Illinois–Indiana–Iowa League	Lenny Backer
C	El Dorado Lions	Cotton States League	Frank O'Rourke
C	Muskogee Reds	Western Association	Ben Tincup
D	Rogers Reds	Arkansas–Missouri League	Lester "Pat" Patterson
D	Williamston Martins	Coastal Plain League	Art Hauger
D	Union City Greyhounds	KITTY League	Hap Bohl
