= Tot Pressnell =

American baseball player (1906–2001)

- Pitcher
- Born: August 8, 1906; Findlay, Ohio, U.S.
- Died: January 6, 2001 (aged 94); Findlay, Ohio, U.S.
- Batted: Right Threw: Right

MLB debut
- April 21, 1938, for the Brooklyn Dodgers

Last MLB appearance
- August 30, 1942, for the Chicago Cubs

MLB statistics
- Win–loss record: 32–30
- Earned run average: 3.80
- Strikeouts: 157
- Stats at Baseball Reference

Teams
- Brooklyn Dodgers (1938–1940); Chicago Cubs (1941–1942)

Forest Charles Pressnell (August 8, 1906 – January 6, 2001) was an American professional baseball player in the Major Leagues from 1938 to 1942. He pitched for the Brooklyn Dodgers and Chicago Cubs.

Pressnell had to wait until the age of 31 to make his Major League debut, but it was an impressive one. In the third game of the 1938 season for Brooklyn, he pitched a complete-game shutout against the Philadelphia Phillies, scattering nine hits. The Dodgers won 9–0 in a snappy 1 hour, 53 minutes.

On June 15 of that year, Pressnell participated in a history-making game. He pitched in relief on that date for Brooklyn in the first night game of Ebbets Field's history, while Johnny Vander Meer of the visiting Cincinnati Reds that night pitched his second consecutive no-hitter, a feat that has not been duplicated in Major League Baseball.

Pressnell went on to a record of 11–14, the most victories he would have in a single season.

In his nine previous minor-league seasons, Pressnell won 111 games, including one season split between the Wichita Falls Spudders and Longview Cannibals.

Pressnell married Ruth Herge (died 1956) in 1931 and Helen Freese Cramer (died 1997) in 1959. After retirement he worked for Ohio Oil, the precessor to Marathon Oil. He died in the city of his birth, Findlay, Ohio, on January 6, 2001, aged 94.
