= Art Rebel =

American baseball player (1914–2004)

- Outfielder
- Born: March 4, 1914; Cincinnati, Ohio, U.S.
- Died: July 10, 2004 (aged 90); Tampa, Florida, U.S.
- Batted: Left Threw: Left

MLB debut
- April 19, 1938, for the Philadelphia Phillies

Last MLB appearance
- September 30, 1945, for the St. Louis Cardinals

MLB statistics
- Batting average: .333
- Home runs: 0
- Runs batted in: 6
- Stats at Baseball Reference

Teams
- Philadelphia Phillies (1938); St. Louis Cardinals (1945)

Arthur Anthony Rebel (March 4, 1914 – July 10, 2004) was an American professional baseball player. He was an outfielder over parts of two seasons (1938, 1945) with the Philadelphia Phillies and St. Louis Cardinals. For his career, he compiled a .333 batting average in 81 at-bats and drove in six runs. Rebel also played 17 seasons for 18 teams in the minor leagues, hitting .301 with 106 home runs.

He was born in Cincinnati, Ohio and later died in Tampa, Florida at the age of 90.
