= Lynn Myers (baseball) =

American baseball player (1914–2000)

- Shortstop / Third baseman
- Born: February 23, 1914; Enola, Pennsylvania, U.S.
- Died: January 19, 2000 (aged 85); Harrisburg, Pennsylvania, U.S.
- Batted: Right Threw: Right

Major League Baseball debut
- July 13, 1938, for the St. Louis Cardinals

Last appearance
- October 1, 1939, for the St. Louis Cardinals

Career statistics
- Batting average: .241
- RBI: 29
- Runs: 42
- Stats at Baseball Reference

Teams
- St. Louis Cardinals (1938–1939)

Career highlights and awards
- His nine stolen bases in 1938 ranked him ninth in the National League

Lynnwood Lincoln Myers (February 23, 1914 – January 19, 2000) was an American backup infielder in Major League Baseball, playing mainly at shortstop from 1938 through 1939 for the St. Louis Cardinals. Listed at 5 feet 6.5 inches (1.689 m), 145 pounds (66 kg), Myers batted and threw right-handed. He was born in Enola, Pennsylvania. His older brother, Billy Myers, was also a major leaguer.

In a two-season career, Myers was a .241 hitter (83-for-344) with one home run and 29 RBI in 144 games, including 42 runs, 16 doubles, three triples, and 10 stolen bases.

Myers died at the age of 85 in Harrisburg, Pennsylvania.
