= Tommy Reis =

American baseball player

- Pitcher
- Born: August 6, 1914; Newport, Kentucky, U.S.
- Died: November 6, 2009 (aged 95); Ocala, Florida, U.S.
- Batted: Right Threw: Right

MLB debut
- April 27, 1938, for the Philadelphia Phillies

Last MLB appearance
- June 25, 1938, for the Boston Bees

MLB statistics
- Win–loss record: 0–1
- Earned run average: 12.27
- Strikeouts: 6
- Stats at Baseball Reference

Teams
- Philadelphia Phillies (1938); Boston Bees (1938)

Thomas Edward Reis (August 6, 1914 – November 6, 2009) was a relief pitcher who played in Major League Baseball in the 1938 season. He batted and threw right-handed.

Born in Newport, Kentucky, Reis was drafted by the Philadelphia Phillies from the Wilkes-Barre team (Eastern) in the 1937 rule V draft. He debuted with Philadelphia in 1938, then was purchased by the Boston Bees during the midseason. In eight appearances, he posted a 0–1 record with six strikeouts and a 12.27 ERA in 11 innings.

During World War II, Reis served with the US Army in the European Theatre of Operations.

At the time of his death, Reis was recognized as one of the oldest living MLB players. Reis was the last surviving person who played at Baker Bowl, the home ballpark for the Phillies between May 2, 1895, and June 30, 1938, as a member of the Phillies.
