= Ray Stoviak =

American baseball player (1915-1998)

- Outfielder
- Born: June 6, 1915; Scottdale, Pennsylvania, U.S.
- Died: February 23, 1998 (aged 82); Nicoya, Costa Rica
- Batted: Right Threw: Right

MLB debut
- June 5, 1938, for the Philadelphia Phillies

Last MLB appearance
- August 7, 1938, for the Philadelphia Phillies

MLB statistics
- Games played: 10
- At bats: 10
- Hits: 0
- Stats at Baseball Reference

Teams
- Philadelphia Phillies (1938)

Raymond Thomas Stoviak (June 6, 1915 – February 23, 1998) was an American outfielder in Major League Baseball. He played for the Philadelphia Phillies in 1938. He was the last player to be struck out in a major league game at the Baker Bowl in Philadelphia, on June 30, 1938.

Stoviak graduated from Villanova College (now Villanova University) in 1938, where he quarterbacked the Wildcats for three years and led his team to a record of 22–4–2. He played for head coaches Harry Stuhldreher, one of the fabled Four Horsemen of Notre Dame, and Maurice J. "Clipper" Smith. Stoviak led the Wildcats to the Bacardi Bowl in Havana, played on January 1, 1937. There, Villanova battled Auburn to a 7–7 tie. He was inducted into Villanova's Varsity Club Hall of Fame on June 8, 1989.

During World War II, he was a first lieutenant in the United States Navy stationed at Chapel Hill, North Carolina, and Pensacola, Florida, where he coached baseball with Bob Kennedy and Ted Williams. In 1946, Stoviak was the backfield coach at the United States Merchant Marine Academy in Kings Point, New York, serving under head football coach Bill Reinhart. In 1947 he was appointed head football coach at athletic director at Arnold College in Milford, Connecticut. He also coached baseball at Arnold. After Arnold was absorbed by the University of Bridgeport in 1953, Stoviak was appointed football coach and mathematics faculty at Meriden High School in Meriden, Connecticut. He later served as assistant football coach at Yale University under Jordan Olivar.

Stoviak suffered a severe stroke in February 1994 and subsequently moved into the home of his daughter in Costa Rica where he died four years later. He became the first Major League Baseball player known to have died in Costa Rica.

== Head coaching record ==
=== College football ===
Year	Team	Overall	Conference	Standing	Bowl/playoffs
Arnold Terriers (Independent) (1947–1952)
1947	Arnold	3–2–1			
1948	Arnold	6–2–1			
1949	Arnold	2–5–1			
1950	Arnold	3–4			
1951	Arnold	2–5–1			
1952	Arnold	4–4			
Roanoke:		20–22–5			
Total:		20–22–5			
