= Eddie Feinberg =

American baseball player (1917-1986)

- Utility player
- Born: September 29, 1917; Philadelphia, Pennsylvania
- Died: April 20, 1986 (aged 68); Hollywood, Florida
- Batted: Both Threw: Right

MLB debut
- September 11, 1938, for the Philadelphia Phillies

Last MLB appearance
- May 23, 1939, for the Philadelphia Phillies

MLB statistics
- Games played: 16
- At bats: 38
- Hits: 7
- Stats at Baseball Reference

Teams
- Philadelphia Phillies (1938–1939)

Edward Isidore Feinberg (September 29, 1917 – April 20, 1986) was a Major League Baseball player who played for the Philadelphia Phillies in 1938 and 1939. He made his Major League debut on September 11, 1938 pinch running for Pinky Whitney in the ninth inning of the second game of a double header against the Boston Bees at Shine Park.

Feinberg was Jewish, and his parents were Ukrainian Jews who emigrated to the United States. He played on the same team as Morrie Arnovich, another Jewish player.

Feinberg was born in Philadelphia and graduated from South Philadelphia High School.
