= Russ Bauers =

American baseball player (1914–1995)

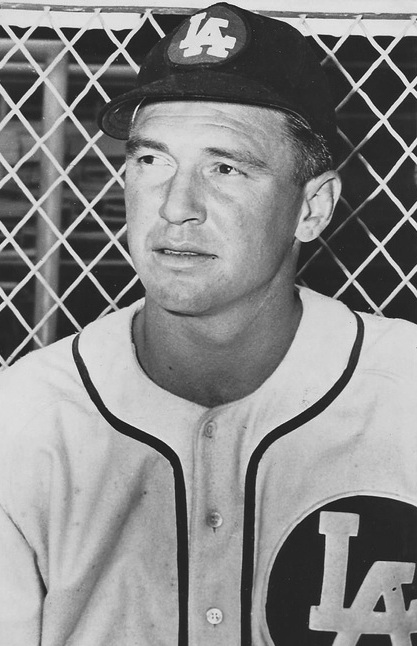
- Pitcher
- Born: May 10, 1914; Townsend, Wisconsin, U.S.
- Died: January 21, 1995 (aged 80); Hines, Illinois, U.S.
- Batted: Left Threw: Right

MLB debut
- August 20, 1936, for the Pittsburgh Pirates

Last MLB appearance
- May 6, 1950, for the St. Louis Browns

MLB statistics
- Win–loss record: 31–30
- Earned run average: 3.53
- Strikeouts: 300
- Stats at Baseball Reference

Teams
- Pittsburgh Pirates (1936–1941); Chicago Cubs (1946); St. Louis Browns (1950)

Russell Lee Bauers (May 10, 1914 – January 21, 1995) was a right-handed pitcher/left-handed batter in Major League Baseball for the Pittsburgh Pirates, Chicago Cubs, and St. Louis Browns during eight different seasons between 1936 and 1950. Signed as a 20-year-old free agent by the Philadelphia Phillies in early 1935, Bauers was released after one year and then signed with the Pirates, the organization for whom he would make his major-league debut.

Bauers was called up from the minors to be the Pirates' starting pitcher on August 20, 1936, but could not make it out of the second inning. In 1 1/3 innings of work, he allowed 5 earned runs on 2 hits and 4 walks for an unflattering ERA of 33.75. He would not return to Pittsburgh until the next season, when he became a regular contributor. Bauers pitched in 35 games, including 19 starts, and posted a 13–6 record. He was able to complete 11 of his starts and even threw 2 shutouts, posting a stellar ERA of 2.88, good enough for fourth-best in the league. Bauers also placed in the league's top ten in strikeouts, winning percentage, and fewest hits allowed per nine innings. His season was good enough to earn him a solid spot in Pittsburgh's starting rotation.

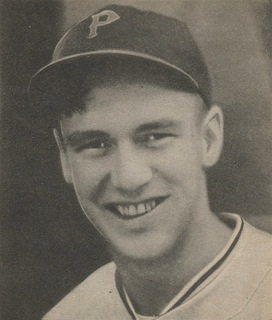
Russ Bauers, circa 1940

Bauers enjoyed another solid season in 1938, though his won-lost record was only 13–14 at year's end. His ERA of 3.07 was still good for seventh-best in the league, and he was in the top ten in innings pitched, strikeouts, games started, and fewest hits allowed per nine innings (where he was second behind only Johnny "Double No-Hit" Vander Meer). After the 1938 season, however, Bauers would become only a part-time major leaguer with oddly lengthy gaps in his career. Over the 1939–1941 seasons combines, he appeared in a total of 38 games, starting only 15, with a won-lost record of 3–9.

From 1943 to 1945 Bauers served in the army during World War II. During this time, he still played baseball while being assigned to the European Theatre of Operations, playing in the ETO World Series.

Although Bauers vanished from the major leagues for four full seasons, he was released by the Pirates before the 1946 season. He was able to sign a contract with the Chicago Cubs in mid-season and made a comeback of sorts, going 2–1 with a save and a nifty 3.53 ERA, but he again vanished from the majors after the season was up. The Cubs released him after the 1948 season, and Bauers was unable to find another suitor until late in the 1949 campaign, when he signed with the St. Louis Browns. In May 1950, the Browns called him up to the major league club at the age of 36. On May 6 he pitched the final two innings of a game against the Philadelphia Athletics. It was his last appearance in the major leagues.

Bauers died on January 21, 1995, in Hines, Illinois.
