= Jim Asbell =

American baseball player (1914–1967)

- Outfielder
- Born: June 22, 1914; Dallas, Texas, U.S.
- Died: July 6, 1967 (aged 53); San Mateo, California, U.S.
- Batted: Right Threw: Right

MLB debut
- May 8, 1938, for the Chicago Cubs

Last MLB appearance
- October 2, 1938, for the Chicago Cubs

MLB statistics
- Batting average: .182
- Home runs: 0
- Runs batted in: 3
- Stats at Baseball Reference

Teams
- Chicago Cubs (1938)

James Marion Asbell (June 22, 1914 – July 6, 1967), nicknamed "Big Train", was an American outfielder in Major League Baseball for the Chicago Cubs. His career was a brief one, consisting of a single season, the Cubs' World Series year of 1938.

After a college career that included stints at both Tulane and Rice, Asbell signed with the New York Giants. After some time in the minors, the Cubs took Asbell in the 1937 Rule 5 draft. He made his major league debut with the Cubs on May 8, 1938. With the Cubs, Asbell appeared in just 17 games, playing only ten in the field. He committed no errors as a defender, but his offense was subpar, as he batted just .182 (6 for 33) with 2 doubles, 3 RBI, and no stolen bases. He played his last game as a Cub, and as a major leaguer, on October 2, 1938. He made no appearances with the club in the World Series.

Asbell died on July 6, 1967, in San Mateo, California.
