= Pete Sivess =

American baseball player (1913-2003)

- Pitcher
- Born: September 23, 1913; South River, New Jersey, U.S.
- Died: June 1, 2003 (aged 89); Candler, North Carolina, U.S.
- Batted: Right Threw: Right

MLB debut
- June 13, 1936, for the Philadelphia Phillies

Last MLB appearance
- October 2, 1938, for the Philadelphia Phillies

MLB statistics
- Win–loss record: 7–11
- Earned run average: 5.38
- Strikeouts: 58
- Stats at Baseball Reference

Teams
- Philadelphia Phillies (1936–1938)

Peter Sivess (September 23, 1913 – June 1, 2003) was an American Major League Baseball pitcher. He pitched all or part of three seasons in the majors, from 1936 until 1938, for the Philadelphia Phillies.

After professional baseball, Sivess worked for a few years at Grumman Aircraft prior to joining the US Navy during World War II. Following the war, he worked for the CIA.

Sivess was raised in South River, New Jersey. He died on June 1, 2003, in Candler, North Carolina, aged 89.
