= Cap Clark =

American baseball player (1906-1957)

- Catcher
- Born: September 19, 1906; Snow Camp, North Carolina, U.S.
- Died: February 16, 1957 (aged 50); Fayetteville, North Carolina, U.S.
- Batted: Left Threw: Right

MLB debut
- April 23, 1938, for the Philadelphia Phillies

Last MLB appearance
- September 16, 1938, for the Philadelphia Phillies

MLB statistics
- Batting average: .257
- Home runs: 0
- Runs batted in: 4
- Stats at Baseball Reference

Teams
- Philadelphia Phillies (1938)

John Carroll "Cap" Clark (September 19, 1906 – February 16, 1957) was an American professional baseball player. He played in Major League Baseball as a catcher for the Philadelphia Phillies. Born in Snow Camp, North Carolina, Clark graduated from Elon University in 1927. In 1938, his only year in Major League Baseball, he played 52 games for the Phillies, 29 of them as the starting catcher. Clark died February 16, 1957, in Fayetteville, North Carolina.
