= Luke Hamlin =

American baseball player (1904–1978)

- Pitcher
- Born: July 3, 1904; Ferris Center, Michigan, U.S.
- Died: February 18, 1978 (aged 73); Clare, Michigan, U.S.
- Batted: Left Threw: Right

MLB debut
- September 18, 1933, for the Detroit Tigers

Last MLB appearance
- September 26, 1944, for the Philadelphia Athletics

MLB statistics
- Win–loss record: 73–76
- Earned run average: 3.77
- Strikeouts: 563
- Stats at Baseball Reference

Teams
- Detroit Tigers (1933–1934); Brooklyn Dodgers (1937–1941); Pittsburgh Pirates (1942); Philadelphia Athletics (1944)

Luke Daniel Hamlin (July 3, 1904 – February 18, 1978) was an American professional baseball pitcher. He played in Major League Baseball (MLB) for the Detroit Tigers (1933–34), Brooklyn Dodgers (1937–41), Pittsburgh Pirates (1942), and Philadelphia Athletics (1944).

Born in Ferris Center, Michigan, Hamlin won the nickname "Hot Potato" because of his tendency to juggle the ball while getting ready to pitch. He pitched two years with the Tigers, going 3–3 in 23 games for the Bengals.

After two years out of the major leagues, Hamlin returned in 1937 with the Dodgers, where he played five seasons from 1937 to 1941. His best year was 1939 when he went 20–13 and had 10 complete games in 269 2/3 innings pitched. Hamlin's 20 wins was 4th best in the National League, his WHIP was 1.146 (3rd in the NL), and he also finished #10 in the National League Most Valuable Player voting in 1939. He had another strong year in 1940 with a 3.06 earned run average for an Adjusted ERA+ of 131 (4th best in the NL). He was also #1 in the National League in 1940 with a strikeout to walk ratio of 2.68.

Hamlin's performance declined after 1940, as his ERA jumped from 3.06 to 4.24 in 1941. Dodgers manager Leo Durocher lost faith in "Hot Potato", who had blown a number of leads over the 1941 season. When Dodgers boss Larry MacPhail sent a messenger between games of a double header telling Durocher to start Hamlin in the second game, Durocher erupted in anger. But Durocher complied with the boss's order and started Hamlin, who gave up 4 runs before getting an out and lasted only 2 innings. After seeing an old political campaign poster for the Abe Lincoln–Hannibal Hamlin ticket, Durocher once quipped: "It proves Lincoln was a great man; he could even win with Hamlin."

Hamlin died in 1978 at age 73 in Clare, Michigan.
