= Gibby Brack =

American baseball player (1908–1960)

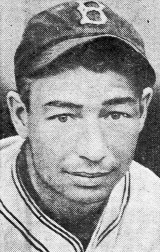
- Outfielder
- Born: March 29, 1908; Chicago, Illinois, U.S.
- Died: January 20, 1960 (aged 51); Greenville, Texas, U.S.
- Batted: Right Threw: Right

MLB debut
- April 23, 1937, for the Brooklyn Dodgers

Last MLB appearance
- September 28, 1939, for the Philadelphia Phillies

MLB statistics
- Batting average: .279
- Home runs: 16
- Runs batted in: 113
- Stats at Baseball Reference

Teams
- Brooklyn Dodgers (1937–1938); Philadelphia Phillies (1938–1939)

Gilbert Herman Brack (March 29, 1908 – January 20, 1960) was an American Major League Baseball outfielder for the Brooklyn Dodgers and Philadelphia Phillies from 1937 to 1939.

In 1933, he passed himself off as 20 years old, when in reality, he was 25. He did this in hopes to have a more successful career.

In 315 games over three seasons, Brack posted a .279 batting average (273-for-980) with 150 runs, 70 doubles, 18 triples, 16 home runs, 113 RBI, 92 bases on balls, .341 on-base percentage and .436 slugging percentage. He finished his major league career with a .969 fielding percentage playing at first base and all three outfield positions.

Brack died of suicide via gunshot at age 51.
