= Jim Tobin =

American baseball player (1912–1969)

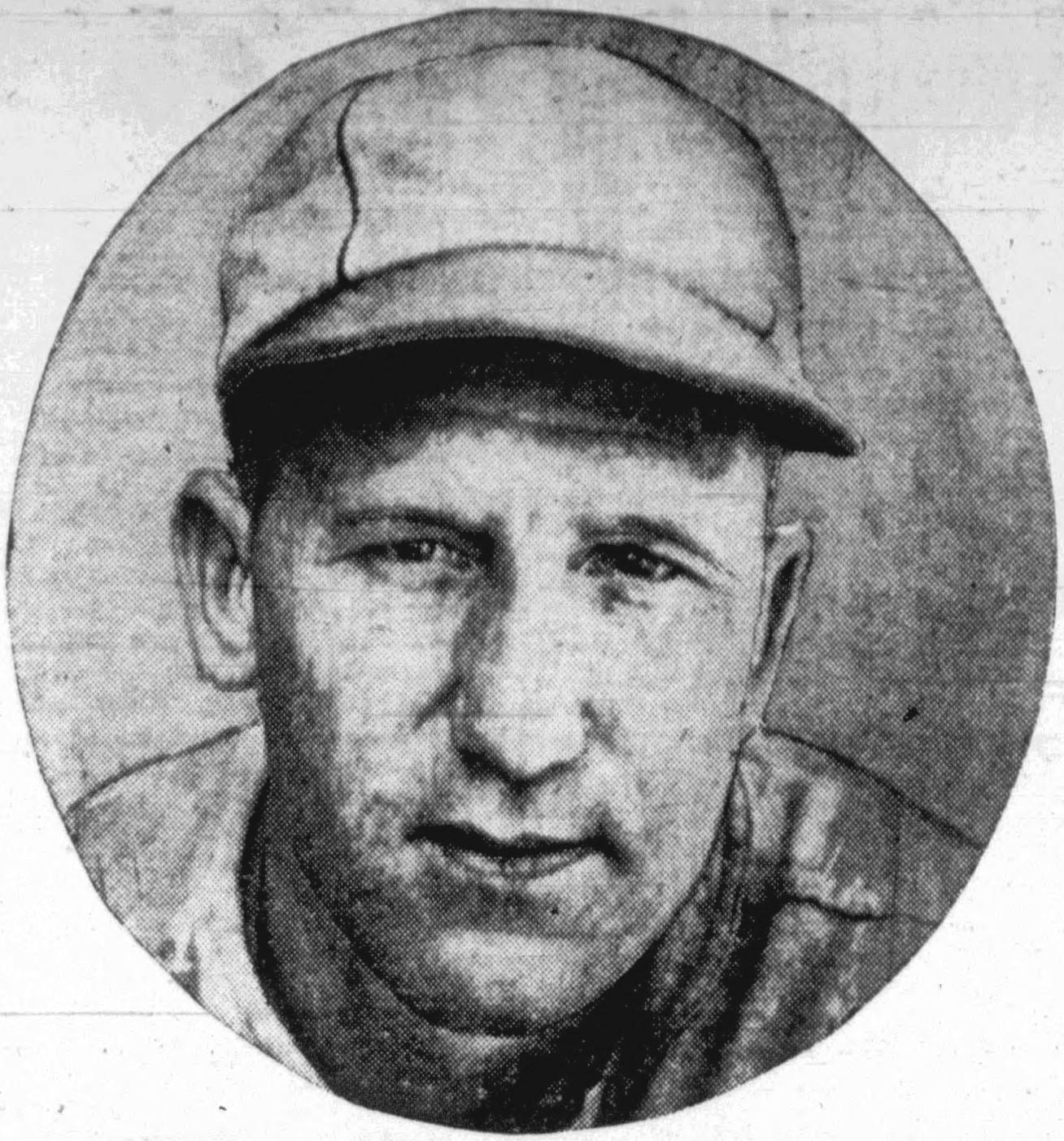
- Tobin, circa 1943
- Pitcher
- Born: December 27, 1912; Oakland, California, U.S.
- Died: May 19, 1969 (aged 56); Oakland, California, U.S.
- Batted: Right Threw: Right

MLB debut
- April 30, 1937, for the Pittsburgh Pirates

Last MLB appearance
- September 23, 1945, for the Detroit Tigers

MLB statistics
- Win–loss record: 105–112
- Earned run average: 3.44
- Strikeouts: 498
- Stats at Baseball Reference

Teams
- Pittsburgh Pirates (1937–1939); Boston Bees / Braves (1940–1945); Detroit Tigers (1945)

Career highlights and awards
- All-Star (1944); World Series champion (1945); Pitched a no-hitter on April 27, 1944

James Anthony Tobin (December 27, 1912 – May 19, 1969), known as "Abba Dabba", was an American right-handed pitcher in Major League Baseball with the Pittsburgh Pirates, Boston Bees/Braves and Detroit Tigers from 1937 to 1945. With the Boston Braves in 1944, he pitched two no-hitters, although one of them was five innings, which was considered a no-hitter until 1991 when the MLB officially defined a no-hitter as having to be nine innings or longer.

== Professional baseball career ==
Tobin was born in Oakland, California, where the hometown Oakland Oaks of the Pacific Coast League picked him up. They sent him to their Bisbee-Douglas farm team in the Arizona–Texas League. The New York Yankees signed him shortly thereafter. He played for them in Binghamton and Wheeling in 1933 and 1934. The Yankees sent him back to Oakland in 1935, where he compiled an 11–8 record before tearing the cartilage in his left knee. Appendicitis kept him off the Yankee roster the following year, and he went 16–8 for the Oaks.

Rather than return to the Oaks in 1937, he arranged a deal with the Pittsburgh Pirates, with whom he made his major league debut on April 30, 1937.

In 1940, Tobin joined the Boston Braves. On May 13, 1942, he became the first pitcher in modern major-league history to hit three home runs in one game, and the only one to date to do so in a regular-season game (Guy Hecker hit three homers in a game in the 19th century, and Shohei Ohtani did so in Game 4 of the 2025 NLCS). He finished the 1942 season with 12 wins and a league leading 21 losses and allowed a league leading 20 home runs to opposing batters. He also hit 6 home runs that year as a pitcher and pinch-hitter.

Still with the Braves in 1944, Tobin began throwing a knuckleball, and that season he threw his two no-hitters. The first was April 27, 1944, when he beat the Brooklyn Dodgers 2–0. The second was a five-inning game on June 22, 1944, in which the Philadelphia Phillies fell 7–0 (officially, this game is no longer considered a true no-hitter, as it lasted fewer than nine innings).

In another interesting event in 1944, Tobin drew a walk against Cincinnati Reds pitcher Clyde Shoun in the third inning of what would otherwise have been a perfect game for Shoun (who settled instead for a no-hitter).

Tobin was with the Tigers in 1945, when they won the American League pennant and the World Series. He pitched in Game 1 of the series, on October 3, which was his final major league game.

He was back in the Pacific Coast League the following year, pitching for the Seattle Rainiers and the San Francisco Seals. He was released in 1947, but the Oaks re-signed him in August 1948. That year he pitched the last out against the Sacramento Solons in a game that clinched the pennant for the Oaks.

Tobin was the brother of Boston Red Sox third baseman Jackie Tobin.

== Career statistics ==
While Tobin played only one major league game at a position other than pitcher -- in 1943, when he played first base -- he pinch-hit over 100 times in his major league career. The fine-hitting hurler batted .230/.303/.345 in the majors. He totaled 35 doubles, 17 homers and 102 RBI in 796 at-bats. He also drew 80 walks.

Tobin went 105–112 in the majors with a 3.44 ERA. He completed 156 of 227 career starts and led the league in complete games twice in 1942 and again in 1944 with 28 games completed each season. In 1942 workhorse Tobin lead the league in innings pitched with 287 2/3. Although not leading the league, he pitched 299 1/3 innings in 1944

In the minors, Tobin won 81 games and lost 51.

== See also ==
- List of Major League Baseball all-time leaders in home runs by pitchers
- List of Major League Baseball no-hitters

Achievements
| Preceded by Lon Warneke | No-hitter pitcher April 27, 1944 | Succeeded by Clyde Shoun |
