= Alex Pitko =

American baseball player (1914-2011)

- Outfield
- Born: November 22, 1914; Burlington, New Jersey, U.S.
- Died: August 1, 2011 (aged 96); Mesa, Arizona, U.S.
- Batted: Right Threw: Right

MLB debut
- September 11, 1938, for the Philadelphia Phillies

Last MLB appearance
- September 21, 1939, for the Washington Senators

MLB statistics
- Batting average: .259
- Hits: 7
- Runs batted in: 3
- Stats at Baseball Reference

Teams
- Philadelphia Phillies (1938); Washington Senators (1939)

Alexander (Alex) "Spunk" Pitko (November 22, 1914 – August 1, 2011) was an American backup outfielder in Major League Baseball who played for the Philadelphia Phillies (1938) and Washington Senators (1939). Born in Burlington, New Jersey, he batted and threw right-handed.

In a two-season career, Pitko was a .259 hitter (7-for-27) with three RBI, two runs, one double, and one stolen base without home runs in 11 games played.
