= Justin Stein =

American baseball player (1911–1992)

- Infielder
- Born: August 9, 1911; St. Louis, Missouri, U.S.
- Died: May 1, 1992 (aged 80); Creve Coeur, Missouri, U.S.
- Batted: Right Threw: Right

MLB debut
- May 28, 1938, for the Philadelphia Phillies

Last MLB appearance
- July 17, 1938, for the Cincinnati Reds

MLB statistics
- Batting average: .281
- Home runs: 0
- Runs batted in: 3
- Stats at Baseball Reference

Teams
- Philadelphia Phillies (1938); Cincinnati Reds (1938)

Justin Marion Stein (August 9, 1911 – May 1, 1992), nicknamed "Ott", was an American infielder in Major League Baseball. He played for the Philadelphia Phillies and Cincinnati Reds.
