= Johnny Vander Meer =

American baseball player (1914–1997)

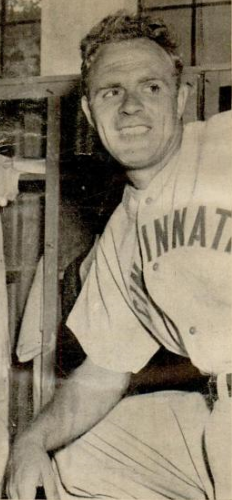
- Vander Meer in 1948
- Pitcher
- Born: November 2, 1914; Prospect Park, New Jersey, U.S.
- Died: October 6, 1997 (aged 82); Tampa, Florida, U.S.
- Batted: Switch Threw: Left

MLB debut
- April 22, 1937, for the Cincinnati Reds

Last MLB appearance
- May 7, 1951, for the Cleveland Indians

MLB statistics
- Win–loss record: 119–121
- Earned run average: 3.44
- Strikeouts: 1,294
- Stats at Baseball Reference

Teams
- Cincinnati Reds (1937–1943, 1946–1949); Chicago Cubs (1950); Cleveland Indians (1951)

Career highlights and awards
- 4× All-Star (1938, 1939, 1942, 1943); World Series champion (1940); 3× NL strikeout leader (1941–1943); Pitched two straight no-hitters on June 11 and 15, 1938; Cincinnati Reds Hall of Fame

John Samuel Vander Meer (November 2, 1914 – October 6, 1997) was an American professional baseball player. He played in Major League Baseball as a left-handed pitcher, most prominently as a member of the Cincinnati Reds, where he became the only pitcher in Major League Baseball history to throw two consecutive no-hitters, an accomplishment which has long been considered to be impossible to replicate. He was a member of the Reds’ 1940 World Series winning team. After the impressive start to his major league career, he experienced problems controlling the accuracy of his pitching, and his later career was marked by inconsistent performances. During his career he was nicknamed "The Dutch Master" and "Double No-Hit".

== Baseball career ==
Born in Prospect Park, New Jersey, he moved with his family to Midland Park, New Jersey in 1918. He had an inauspicious start to his professional baseball career. He was signed by the Brooklyn Dodgers as an amateur free agent in 1933 and assigned to the Dayton Ducks. Dayton then sold his contract to a Boston Bees minor league affiliate, the Scranton Miners of the New York–Pennsylvania League. The Miners found his playing ability to be lacking and sent him to the Cincinnati Reds affiliate, the Nashville Volunteers, in a trade for Tiny Chaplin. From Nashville, he was sent to the Durham Bulls, where the Bulls manager and catcher, Johnny Gooch, was credited with helping control the wildness of Vander Meer's pitching. In 1936, he posted a record of 19 wins against six losses for Durham.

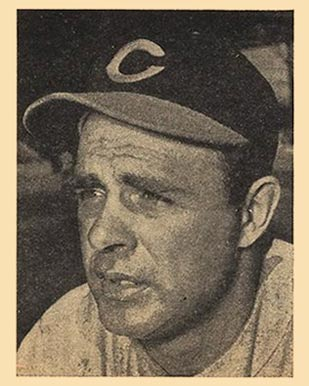
Vander Meer in 1940

Vander Meer made his major league debut with the Cincinnati Reds on April 22, 1937, at the age of 22. He went 3–4 before being sent back to the minor leagues with the Syracuse Chiefs for most of the season when the Reds recalled him in September. The following year on June 11, 1938, Vander Meer pitched a no-hitter against the Boston Bees. Four days later against the Brooklyn Dodgers in what was the first night game ever held at Ebbets Field, he threw another no-hitter, becoming the first and thus far only player in major league history to throw two straight no-hitters. He was nicknamed "The Dutch Master" due to his Dutch heritage, and after the no-hitters was also nicknamed "Two No-Hit".

Vander Meer's performance earned him the role as the starting pitcher for the National League team in the 1938 All-Star game held at Cincinnati's Crosley Field. The American League team – having won four of the previous five All-Star games – was favored to win the game, but Vander Meer pitched three scoreless innings and allowed only one hit, as the National League went on to win 4–1. He ended the season with a 15–10 record and a 3.12 earned run average for the fourth-place Reds. He might have won more games, but spent nearly a month in the hospital being treated for boils late in the season. Following the season, The Sporting News named Vander Meer their MLB Player of the Year for 1938.

After his impressive rookie season, Vander Meer had a disappointing 1939 season, when he fell ill during spring training, and then suffered an injury when he slipped on a wet pitching mound in Pittsburgh. He posted a 5–9 record and an earned run average of 4.67. Early in the 1940 season, he began to experience problems controlling the accuracy of his pitches. In June, the Reds released him back to the minor leagues where he played for the Indianapolis Indians and went 6–4. He returned to the major leagues in September and posted a 3–1 record, including a win for pitching 12 innings against Philadelphia on September 18, a win that clinched the National League pennant for the Reds. Leading off the 13th inning, Vander Meer hit a double, advanced to third on a sacrifice bunt, stayed at third on an infield hit, then scored the winning run on a sacrifice fly. [Note: the Sacrifice Fly was not an official statistic in 1940, so the At Bat by Ival Goodman counted, as did his RBI]. In the 1940 World Series against the Detroit Tigers, Vander Meer made only one appearance when he entered Game 5 in the fifth inning with the Reds trailing 7–0. He pitched three scoreless innings as the Reds lost 8–0. The Reds went on to win the series in seven games. It would be the only post-season appearance of Vander Meer's career.

In 1941, Vander Meer's performance improved somewhat with a 16–12 record and six shutouts while leading the league with 202 strikeouts. On June 6, 1941, in a game against Philadelphia, he allowed only one hit. Vander Meer later recalled that the only hit in the game could have been ruled an error, as shortstop Eddie Joost fielded the ground ball, then dropped it before throwing to first base. He earned his third All-Star selection in the 1942 All-Star Game, and once again threw three scoreless innings in a 3–1 loss to the American League. He finished the 1942 season with a career-high 18 wins against 12 losses and once again led the league in strikeouts. He posted a 15–16 record in 1943 for the second place Reds and led the league in strikeouts for a third consecutive year. On March 3, 1944, Vander Meer joined the United States Navy and was stationed at Sampson Naval Training Station in New York where he would play for the Navy baseball team. He was discharged from the Navy in December 1945, having lost two years of his major league career to his military service, but Vander Meer claimed that his extensive military play made him less wild as a pitcher, which his record partially supports.

The 31-year-old pitcher returned to play for the Reds in 1946 although he was not able to recapture his previous form. Vander Meer was an incidental witness when his Cincinnati teammate Ewell Blackwell almost duplicated his consecutive no-hit feat in 1947, by pitching a no-hitter against the Braves, then in his next appearance held the Dodgers without a hit until the ninth inning when he gave up two hits. He produced one more notable season in 1948 when he went 17–14, before his contract was sold to the Chicago Cubs in February 1950. After an ineffective year with the Cubs, he was released in March 1951 and was signed as a free agent by the Cleveland Indians. He appeared in only one game for the Indians on May 7, 1951, before being released on June 30, 1951, at the age of 36.

Vander Meer returned to the minor leagues where he played for five more seasons until the age of 40. In 1952, 14 years after his consecutive no-hitters, Vander Meer pitched a no-hitter for the Tulsa Oilers against the Beaumont Roughnecks in the Texas League.

== Career statistics ==
A four-time All-Star, Vander Meer compiled a 119–121 record with 1,294 strikeouts and a 3.44 ERA in 2,104 2/3 innings over a 13-year Major League career. He had 29 career shutouts, ranking third on the Reds franchise list. His 1,251 strikeouts with the Reds were the team record at the time of his retirement in 1951. Along with Dizzy Dean (1932–1935), Warren Spahn (1949–1952), Randy Johnson (1999–2002), Tim Lincecum (2008–2010), and Max Scherzer (2016–2018), Vander Meer is one of only six NL pitchers since 1930 to lead the league in strikeouts in three straight seasons (1941–1943).

== Later life ==
After retiring as a player at the age of 40, Vander Meer became a minor league manager in the Cincinnati Reds organization for ten seasons before retiring in 1962. After his retirement from baseball, he worked for a brewing company. He was inducted as part of the inaugural class into the Cincinnati Reds Hall of Fame in 1958. He died of an abdominal aneurysm at his home in Tampa, Florida, on October 6, 1997, at the age of 82.

Achievements
Preceded by Bill Dietrich	No-hitter pitcher June 11, 1938; June 15, 1938	Succeeded by Monte Pearson
