= 1940 Philadelphia Phillies season =

1940 Philadelphia Phillies
- League: National League
- Ballpark: Shibe Park
- City: Philadelphia
- Owners: Gerald Nugent
- Managers: Doc Prothro
- Radio: WCAU (Bill Dyer, Harry McTigue); WIP (By Saam, Stoney McLinn)

The 1940 Philadelphia Phillies season was the 58th season in the history of the franchise. The team, managed by Doc Prothro, began their third season at Shibe Park and were picked by 73 of 76 writers in the pre-season Associated Press poll of baseball writers to finish last. The Phillies lost 103 games and finished last, 50 games behind the pennant-winning Cincinnati Reds.

== Offseason ==
In March 1940, the Phillies, along with the St. Louis Browns and Boston Bees were made outstanding offers of $5,000,000 by attorney Richard Cantillon for one of the teams to move its franchise to Los Angeles. Phillies owner Gerald Nugent quickly dismissed the possibility of the Phillies considering the move.

The 1940 season was the 25th anniversary of the team's 1915 National League pennant, the Phillies' lone to date. Gerry Nugent announced in April 1940 that the organization would welcome back the players from the 1915 team to celebrate the anniversary.

== Regular season ==
=== Season standings ===
National League
Team	W	L	Pct.	GB	Home	Road
Cincinnati Reds	100	53	.654	—	55‍–‍21	45‍–‍32
Brooklyn Dodgers	88	65	.575	12	41‍–‍37	47‍–‍28
St. Louis Cardinals	84	69	.549	16	41‍–‍36	43‍–‍33
Pittsburgh Pirates	78	76	.506	22½	40‍–‍34	38‍–‍42
Chicago Cubs	75	79	.487	25½	40‍–‍37	35‍–‍42
New York Giants	72	80	.474	27½	33‍–‍43	39‍–‍37
Boston Bees	65	87	.428	34½	35‍–‍40	30‍–‍47
Philadelphia Phillies	50	103	.327	50	24‍–‍55	26‍–‍48

=== Record vs. opponents ===
1940 National League record Sources:
Team	BSN	BRO	CHC	CIN	NYG	PHI	PIT	STL
Boston	—	9–13	8–14	9–12	7–15	15–6	9–13	8–14
Brooklyn	13–9	—	10–12	8–14–1	16–5	17–5	15–7–1	9–13–1
Chicago	14–8	12–10	—	6–16	12–10	12–10	11–11	8–14
Cincinnati	12–9	14–8–1	16–6	—	15–7	15–7	16–6	12–10–1
New York	15–7	5–16	10–12	7–15	—	12–10	12–10	11–10
Philadelphia	6–15	5–17	10–12	7–15	10–12	—	6–16	6–16
Pittsburgh	13–9	7–15–1	11–11	6–16	10–12	16–6	—	15–7–1
St. Louis	14–8	13–9–1	14–8	10–12–1	10–11	16–6	7–15–1	—

=== Game log ===
Legend
	Phillies win
	Phillies loss
	Postponement
**Bold**	Phillies team member

1940 Game Log
Overall Record: 50–103
April (3–5)

#	Date	Opponent	Score	Win	Loss	Save	Attendance	Record
1	April 16	@ Giants	3–1	**Kirby Higbe** (1–0)	Carl Hubbell (0–1)	None	14,840	1–0
–	April 17	@ Giants	Postponed (threatening weather, rain, cold and wet grounds); Makeup: July 7 as a traditional double-header					
–	April 18	@ Giants	Postponed (rain, wet grounds); Makeup: August 18 as a traditional double-header					
–	April 19	Bees	Postponed (rain); Makeup: July 3 as a traditional double-header					
–	April 20	Bees	Postponed (rain); Makeup: August 6 as a traditional double-header					
–	April 21	Bees	Postponed (rain); Makeup: September 7 as a traditional double-header					
–	April 22	Giants	Postponed (cold weather, rain, wet grounds); Makeup: June 30 as a traditional double-header					
2	April 23	Giants	0–1	Harry Gumbert (1–0)	**Kirby Higbe** (0–1)	None	5,000	1–1
3	April 24	Giants	2–5	Hy Vandenberg (1–0)	**Hugh Mulcahy** (0–1)	None	3,000	1–2
4	April 25	Dodgers	1–3	Hugh Casey (2–0)	**Ike Pearson** (0–1)	None	1,466	1–3
5	April 26	Dodgers	0–6	Freddie Fitzsimmons (1–0)	**Lefty Smoll** (0–1)	None	1,500	1–4
6	April 27	@ Bees	5–4	**Lefty Smoll** (1–1)	Al Javery (0–1)	**Lloyd Brown** (1)	2,345	2–4
7	April 28	@ Bees	2–3	Joe Sullivan (1–0)	**Kirby Higbe** (1–2)	None	6,417	2–5
8	April 30	@ Pirates	6–2	**Hugh Mulcahy** (1–1)	Bob Klinger (1–2)	None	2,015	3–5

May (9–13)

#	Date	Opponent	Score	Win	Loss	Save	Attendance	Record
–	May 1	@ Pirates	Postponed (rain); Makeup: June 9 as a traditional double-header					
–	May 2	@ Pirates	Postponed (threatening and cold weather, rain, wet grounds); Makeup: August 28 as a traditional double-header					
–	May 3	@ Reds	Postponed (rain, wet grounds, cold weather); Makeup: July 14 as a traditional double-header					
9	May 4	@ Reds	2–3 (11)	Joe Beggs (1–0)	**Kirby Higbe** (1–3)	None	4,530	3–6
10	May 5	@ Cubs	7–5	**Hugh Mulcahy** (2–1)	Bill Lee (2–3)	**Lloyd Brown** (2)	14,676	4–6
11	May 6	@ Cubs	4–5 (11)	Larry French (4–1)	**Lloyd Brown** (0–1)	None	5,293	4–7
12	May 7	@ Cubs	1–0	**Ike Pearson** (1–1)	Claude Passeau (1–3)	None	2,054	5–7
13	May 8	@ Cardinals	4–7	Bill McGee (2–1)	**Lefty Smoll** (1–2)	Clyde Shoun (1)	1,333	5–8
14	May 9	@ Cardinals	4–8	Ernie White (1–0)	**Lloyd Brown** (0–2)	None	1,161	5–9
15	May 11	@ Dodgers	5–4	**Kirby Higbe** (2–3)	Luke Hamlin (2–1)	None	10,870	6–9
16	May 12	@ Dodgers	3–5	Freddie Fitzsimmons (2–0)	**Si Johnson** (0–1)	Tot Pressnell (1)	14,505	6–10
17	May 13	@ Dodgers	3–6	Vito Tamulis (1–0)	**Ike Pearson** (1–2)	None	5,337	6–11
18	May 14	Cardinals	4–0	**Hugh Mulcahy** (3–1)	Ernie White (1–1)	None	1,500	7–11
19	May 15	Cardinals	6–3	**Kirby Higbe** (3–3)	Gene Lillard (0–1)	None	2,000	8–11
–	May 16	Cardinals	Postponed (rain); Makeup: July 25					
20	May 17	Reds	2–7 (11)	Whitey Moore (1–0)	**Lloyd Brown** (0–3)	Elmer Riddle (2)	1,731	8–12
21	May 18	Reds	8–3	**Hugh Mulcahy** (4–1)	Paul Derringer (3–3)	None	8,000	9–12
22	May 19	Pirates	6–5	**Si Johnson** (1–1)	Rip Sewell (0–1)	None	8,981	10–12
23	May 20	Pirates	8–7	**Lefty Hoerst** (1–0)	Dick Lanahan (0–2)	None	1,000	11–12
–	May 21	Pirates	Postponed (rain); Makeup: June 26 as a traditional double-header					
–	May 22	Cubs	Postponed (rain); Makeup: May 23					
24	May 23	Cubs	3–4 (13)	Vern Olsen (2–1)	**Hugh Mulcahy** (4–2)	Vance Page (1)	7,801	11–13
–	May 24	Dodgers	Postponed (rain, cold, threatening weather); Makeup: September 5					
–	May 25	Dodgers	Postponed (rain); Makeup: September 6 as a traditional double-header					
25	May 26	Dodgers	1–2 (10)	Vito Tamulis (2–0)	**Kirby Higbe** (3–4)	None	3,281	11–14
26	May 27	@ Dodgers	0–6	Whit Wyatt (4–2)	**Lefty Smoll** (1–3)	None	3,578	11–15
27	May 28	@ Dodgers	2–4	Freddie Fitzsimmons (4–0)	**Hugh Mulcahy** (4–3)	None	28,918	11–16
28	May 29	@ Bees	1–3	Dick Errickson (2–0)	**Boom-Boom Beck** (0–1)	None	1,143	11–17
29	May 30 (1)	@ Bees	5–1	**Kirby Higbe** (4–4)	Lou Fette (0–2)	None	see 2nd game	12–17
30	May 30 (2)	@ Bees	1–5 (11)	Joe Sullivan (2–4)	**Si Johnson** (1–2)	None	14,738	12–18

June (9–21)

#	Date	Opponent	Score	Win	Loss	Save	Attendance	Record
31	June 1	@ Cardinals	5–4	**Hugh Mulcahy** (5–3)	Jack Russell (2–1)	**Lloyd Brown** (3)	2,027	13–18
32	June 2 (1)^{^{[a]}}	@ Cardinals	4–2	**Boom-Boom Beck** (1–1)	Max Lanier (2–2)	None	see 2nd game	14–18
33	June 2 (2)^{^{[a]}}	@ Cardinals	2–9	Bob Bowman (1–3)	**Lefty Smoll** (1–4)	None	7,061	14–19
34	June 4	@ Cubs	6–12	Charlie Root (1–0)	**Syl Johnson** (0–1)	None	3,433	14–20
35	June 5	@ Cubs	2–3	Larry French (6–4)	**Hugh Mulcahy** (5–4)	None	3,304	14–21
36	June 6	@ Cubs	5–11	Bill Lee (5–7)	**Ike Pearson** (1–3)	Jake Mooty (1)	3,461	14–22
37	June 7	@ Pirates	4–10	Johnny Lanning (1–1)	**Si Johnson** (1–3)	None	1,174	14–23
38	June 8	@ Pirates	5–6	Ken Heintzelman (1–0)	**Si Johnson** (1–4)	Mace Brown (1)	3,055	14–24
39	June 9 (1)	@ Pirates	6–1	**Hugh Mulcahy** (6–4)	Bob Klinger (4–5)	None	see 2nd game	15–24
40	June 9 (2)	@ Pirates	5–11 (8)^{^{[b]}}	Mace Brown (4–4)	**Ike Pearson** (1–4)	None	14,450	15–25
41	June 11	@ Reds	4–1	**Boom-Boom Beck** (2–1)	Bucky Walters (9–2)	None	3,623	16–25
42	June 12	@ Reds	1–2	Paul Derringer (8–4)	**Kirby Higbe** (4–5)	None	17,289	16–26
43	June 14	Cardinals	2–6	Bob Bowman (2–3)	**Hugh Mulcahy** (6–5)	None	3,000	16–27
44	June 15	Cardinals	1–14	Mort Cooper (1–3)	**Boom-Boom Beck** (2–2)	None	1,000	16–28
45	June 16 (1)	Cardinals	3–9	Jack Russell (3–2)	**Kirby Higbe** (4–6)	None	see 2nd game	16–29
46	June 16 (2)	Cardinals	1–3	Lon Warneke (4–6)	**Cy Blanton** (0–1)	None	9,847	16–30
47	June 17	Reds	2–6	Whitey Moore (2–1)	**Boom-Boom Beck** (2–3)	None	1,000	16–31
48	June 18	Reds	3–1	**Hugh Mulcahy** (7–5)	Bucky Walters (9–4)	None	10,381	17–31
49	June 20	Reds	4–3 (12)	**Kirby Higbe** (5–6)	Joe Beggs (3–2)	None	7,421	18–31
50	June 21	Cubs	6–5	**Lloyd Brown** (1–3)	Bill Lee (5–9)	**Ike Pearson** (1)	1,000	19–31
51	June 22	Cubs	2–10	Claude Passeau (6–7)	**Ike Pearson** (1–5)	None	2,500	19–32
52	June 23 (1)	Cubs	2–3	Jake Mooty (4–0)	**Hugh Mulcahy** (7–6)	None	see 2nd game	19–33
53	June 23 (2)	Cubs	2–7	Ken Raffensberger (3–1)	**Boom-Boom Beck** (2–4)	None	12,201	19–34
–	June 24	Pirates	Postponed (rain); Makeup: August 3					
54	June 25	Pirates	7–9	Johnny Lanning (2–2)	**Kirby Higbe** (5–7)	Bob Klinger (1)	1,000	19–35
55	June 26 (1)	Pirates	4–2	**Cy Blanton** (1–1)	Joe Bowman (4–5)	None	see 2nd game	20–35
56	June 26 (2)	Pirates	6–11	Rip Sewell (4–1)	**Boom-Boom Beck** (2–5)	Mace Brown (4)	12,565	20–36
57	June 27	Giants	0–7	Hal Schumacher (5–6)	**Hugh Mulcahy** (7–7)	None	10,985	20–37
58	June 29	Giants	0–5	Bill Lohrman (7–3)	**Kirby Higbe** (5–8)	None	2,000	20–38
59	June 30 (1)	Giants	7–4	**Cy Blanton** (2–1)	Paul Dean (2–2)	None	see 2nd game	21–38
60	June 30 (2)	Giants	3–7	Jumbo Brown (1–2)	**Lefty Smoll** (1–5)	Red Lynn (1)	10,816	21–39

July (11–17)

#	Date	Opponent	Score	Win	Loss	Save	Attendance	Record
61	July 1	Dodgers	3–4	Tot Pressnell (4–2)	**Hugh Mulcahy** (7–8)	Curt Davis (2)	1,516	21–40
62	July 2	Dodgers	1–4	Tex Carleton (4–1)	**Ike Pearson** (1–6)	None	1,067	21–41
63	July 3 (1)	Bees	3–8	Joe Sullivan (5–7)	**Kirby Higbe** (5–9)	None	7,000	21–42
–	July 3 (2)	Bees	Postponed (rain); Makeup: August 8					
64	July 4 (1)	Bees	4–3	**Cy Blanton** (3–1)	Manny Salvo (2–1)	None	see 2nd game	22–42
65	July 4 (2)	Bees	4–5	Dick Coffman (1–2)	**Lefty Smoll** (1–6)	Bill Posedel (1)	5,082	22–43
66	July 5	@ Giants	2–15	Cliff Melton (8–2)	**Hugh Mulcahy** (7–9)	None	4,702	22–44
67	July 6	@ Giants	8–2	**Kirby Higbe** (6–9)	Paul Dean (2–3)	None	5,645	23–44
68	July 7 (1)	@ Giants	4–6	Hal Schumacher (6–7)	**Hugh Mulcahy** (7–10)	Bill Lohrman (1)	see 2nd game	23–45
69	July 7 (2)	@ Giants	4–2	**Si Johnson** (2–4)	Roy Joiner (2–1)	None	16,390	24–45
–	July 9	**1940 Major League Baseball All-Star Game at Sportsman's Park in St. Louis**						
–	July 11	@ Pirates	Postponed (rain); Makeup: August 30					
70	July 12	@ Pirates	6–3	**Hugh Mulcahy** (8–10)	Joe Bowman (4–7)	None	9,042	25–45
71	July 13	@ Pirates	8–9	Danny MacFayden (2–2)	**Si Johnson** (2–5)	Joe Bowman (1)	2,375	25–46
72	July 14 (1)	@ Reds	2–3	Jim Turner (6–3)	**Kirby Higbe** (6–10)	None	see 2nd game	25–47
73	July 14 (2)	@ Reds	1–7	Whitey Moore (3–2)	**Boom-Boom Beck** (2–6)	None	17,251	25–48
74	July 15	@ Reds	2–3	Bucky Walters (13–4)	**Ike Pearson** (1–7)	None	3,015	25–49
–	July 16	@ Reds	Postponed (rain); Makeup: July 28 as a traditional double-header in Philadelphia					
75	July 17	@ Cardinals	3–0	**Hugh Mulcahy** (9–10)	Mort Cooper (5–6)	None	7,113	26–49
76	July 19 (1)^{^{[a]}}	@ Cardinals	2–3	Bill McGee (8–5)	**Kirby Higbe** (6–11)	None	1,680	26–50
77	July 19 (2)^{^{[a]}}	@ Cardinals	3–5^{^{[c]}}	Bob Bowman (3–3)	**Cy Blanton** (3–2)	None	1,630	26–51
78	July 20	@ Cubs	9–3	**Ike Pearson** (2–7)	Larry French (9–8)	None	5,382	27–51
79	July 21 (1)	@ Cubs	8–2	**Hugh Mulcahy** (10–10)	Vern Olsen (6–6)	None	see 2nd game	28–51
80	July 21 (2)	@ Cubs	5–8	Jake Mooty (6–3)	**Si Johnson** (2–6)	None	15,737	28–52
81	July 23	Cardinals	3–7	Bill McGee (9–5)	**Cy Blanton** (3–3)	Ira Hutchinson (1)	4,000	28–53
–	July 24	Cardinals	Postponed (rain); Makeup: September 16 as a traditional double-header					
–	July 25	Cardinals	Postponed (rain); Makeup: September 15 as a traditional double-header					
82	July 26	Reds	5–9	Paul Derringer (14–7)	**Kirby Higbe** (6–12)	Joe Beggs (2)	6,211	28–54
83	July 27	Reds	5–3	**Hugh Mulcahy** (11–10)	Whitey Moore (4–3)	None	3,500	29–54
84	July 28 (1)	Reds	2–7	Jim Turner (8–3)	**Boom-Boom Beck** (2–7)	None	see 2nd game	29–55
85	July 28 (2)	Reds	4–1	**Cy Blanton** (4–3)	Bucky Walters (15–5)	None	10,160	30–55
86	July 29	Cubs	3–7	Claude Passeau (12–9)	**Ike Pearson** (2–8)	None	1,000	30–56
87	July 30	Cubs	7–5	**Kirby Higbe** (7–12)	Bill Lee (7–13)	**Si Johnson** (1)	1,000	31–56
88	July 31	Cubs	7–3	**Hugh Mulcahy** (12–10)	Jake Mooty (6–5)	None	7,500	32–56

August (7–23)

#	Date	Opponent	Score	Win	Loss	Save	Attendance	Record
89	August 2	Pirates	2–5 (10)	Joe Bowman (6–7)	**Si Johnson** (2–7)	Bob Klinger (2)	7,521	32–57
90	August 3	Pirates	0–8	Mace Brown (8–7)	**Kirby Higbe** (7–13)	None	1,000	32–58
91	August 4 (1)	Pirates	1–6	Rip Sewell (9–2)	**Hugh Mulcahy** (12–11)	None	see 2nd game	32–59
92	August 4 (2)	Pirates	4–6	Johnny Lanning (4–2)	**Charlie Frye** (0–1)	Ken Heintzelman (2)	7,182	32–60
93	August 6 (1)	Bees	0–3	Manny Salvo (6–5)	**Si Johnson** (2–8)	None	5,288	32–61
94	August 6 (2)	Bees	2–12	Joe Sullivan (8–12)	**Kirby Higbe** (7–14)	None	5,280	32–62
95	August 7	Bees	3–6	Bill Posedel (7–14)	**Ike Pearson** (2–9)	None	4,929	32–63
96	August 8	Bees	2–6	Jim Tobin (1–0)	**Hugh Mulcahy** (12–12)	None	1,000	32–64
97	August 10	Giants	0–1	Harry Gumbert (9–9)	**Si Johnson** (2–9)	None	1,500	32–65
98	August 11 (1)^{^{[d]}}	Giants	2–0	**Kirby Higbe** (8–14)	Cliff Melton (8–4)	None	see 2nd game	33–65
99	August 11 (2)^{^{[d]}}	Giants	2–8	Hal Schumacher (9–9)	**Hugh Mulcahy** (12–13)	None	6,666	33–66
–	August 13	@ Dodgers	Postponed (rain); Makeup: August 14 as a traditional double-header					
100	August 14 (1)	@ Dodgers	5–6	Freddie Fitzsimmons (12–2)	**Si Johnson** (2–10)	Tex Carleton (2)	see 2nd game	33–67
101	August 14 (2)	@ Dodgers	9–6	**Boom-Boom Beck** (3–7)	Tex Carleton (4–6)	**Kirby Higbe** (1)	24,356	34–67
102	August 15	@ Dodgers	4–2	**Kirby Higbe** (9–14)	Whit Wyatt (12–10)	None	4,840	35–67
103	August 16	@ Giants	3–5	Hal Schumacher (10–9)	**Hugh Mulcahy** (12–14)	None	7,362	35–68
–	August 17	@ Giants	Postponed (rain); Makeup: September 26 as a traditional double-header					
104	August 18 (1)	@ Giants	6–3	**Kirby Higbe** (10–14)	Cliff Melton (8–6)	**Syl Johnson** (1)	see 2nd game	36–68
105	August 18 (2)	@ Giants	8–6	**Si Johnson** (3–10)	Harry Gumbert (9–11)	None	9,502	37–68
106	August 20	@ Cubs	0–4	Claude Passeau (15–11)	**Hugh Mulcahy** (12–15)	None	4,508	37–69
107	August 21	@ Cubs	7–5 (10)	**Lefty Smoll** (2–6)	Ken Raffensberger (5–6)	**Syl Johnson** (2)	4,200	38–69
108	August 22	@ Cardinals	0–9	Mort Cooper (9–8)	**Charlie Frye** (0–2)	None	2,136	38–70
109	August 23	@ Cardinals	2–5	Bob Bowman (5–4)	**Kirby Higbe** (10–15)	None	1,095	38–71
110	August 24	@ Cardinals	0–1	Lon Warneke (13–7)	**Si Johnson** (3–11)	None	2,423	38–72
111	August 25 (1)	@ Reds	2–3	Jim Turner (10–6)	**Boom-Boom Beck** (3–8)	None	see 2nd game	38–73
112	August 25 (2)	@ Reds	5–6	Johnny Hutchings (2–1)	**Hugh Mulcahy** (12–16)	None	23,544	38–74
113	August 26 (1)	@ Reds	2–3	Bucky Walters (18–9)	**Lefty Smoll** (2–7)	None	see 2nd game	38–75
114	August 26 (2)	@ Reds	6–1	**Syl Johnson** (1–1)	Whitey Moore (6–7)	None	7,024	39–75
–	August 27	@ Reds	Postponed (rain); Makeup: August 26 as a traditional double-header					
115	August 28 (1)	@ Pirates	0–5	Rip Sewell (12–3)	**Hugh Mulcahy** (12–17)	None	see 2nd game	39–76
116	August 28 (2)	@ Pirates	2–5	Joe Bowman (7–8)	**Kirby Higbe** (10–16)	None	4,100	39–77
117	August 29	@ Pirates	0–4	Mace Brown (9–8)	**Ike Pearson** (2–10)	Danny MacFayden (2)	2,239	39–78
–	August 30	@ Pirates	Postponed (rain); Makeup: September 10 as a traditional double-header in Philadelphia					
118	August 31	@ Bees	4–9	Joe Sullivan (10–13)	**Charlie Frye** (0–3)	None	3,024	39–79

September (11–24)

#	Date	Opponent	Score	Win	Loss	Save	Attendance	Record
119	September 1 (1)	@ Bees	1–2	Jim Tobin (4–2)	**Hugh Mulcahy** (12–18)	None	see 2nd game	39–80
120	September 1 (2)	@ Bees	0–10	Manny Salvo (9–6)	**Ike Pearson** (2–11)	None	10,986	39–81
121	September 2 (1)	Giants	11–2	**Kirby Higbe** (11–16)	Harry Gumbert (9–12)	None	see 2nd game	40–81
122	September 2 (2)	Giants	6–5 (10)	**Boom-Boom Beck** (4–8)	Roy Joiner (3–2)	None	13,325	41–81
123	September 4	Dodgers	0–3	Luke Hamlin (9–7)	**Charlie Frye** (0–4)	None	18,031	41–82
124	September 5	Dodgers	5–8 (10)	Vito Tamulis (8–4)	**Hugh Mulcahy** (12–19)	None	500	41–83
125	September 6 (1)	Dodgers	0–3	Freddie Fitzsimmons (14–2)	**Kirby Higbe** (11–17)	None	see 2nd game	41–84
126	September 6 (2)	Dodgers	3–14	Hugh Casey (8–7)	**Lefty Smoll** (2–8)	None	8,358	41–85
127	September 7 (1)	Bees	2–3 (10)	Bill Posedel (11–16)	**Syl Johnson** (1–2)	None	see 2nd game	41–86
128	September 7 (2)	Bees	1–3	Al Javery (2–4)	**Ike Pearson** (2–12)	None	1,500	41–87
129	September 8 (1)	Bees	2–1 (12)	**Kirby Higbe** (12–17)	Dick Errickson (11–11)	None	see 2nd game	42–87
130	September 8 (2)	Bees	3–1	**Si Johnson** (4–11)	Jim Tobin (4–3)	None	5,000	43–87
131	September 10 (1)	Pirates	3–11	Joe Bowman (8–9)	**Hugh Mulcahy** (12–20)	None	see 2nd game	43–88
132	September 10 (2)	Pirates	1–11	Rip Sewell (14–3)	**Charlie Frye** (0–5)	None	1,000	43–89
133	September 11	Pirates	3–9	Mace Brown (10–8)	**Ike Pearson** (2–13)	None	2,500	43–90
134	September 12	Cubs	1–5	Larry French (13–13)	**Si Johnson** (4–12)	None	1,000	43–91
135	September 13	Cubs	6–1	**Kirby Higbe** (13–17)	Charlie Root (2–4)	None	500	44–91
136	September 14	Cubs	5–3	**Syl Johnson** (2–2)	Bill Lee (8–16)	None	1,500	45–91
137	September 15 (1)	Cardinals	0–7	Bill McGee (15–9)	**Ike Pearson** (2–14)	None	see 2nd game	45–92
138	September 15 (2)	Cardinals	1–3	Bob Bowman (7–5)	**Johnny Podgajny** (0–1)	None	7,929	45–93
139	September 16 (1)	Cardinals	3–2	**Si Johnson** (5–12)	Mort Cooper (9–12)	None	see 2nd game	46–93
140	September 16 (1)	Cardinals	1–7	Ira Hutchinson (2–2)	**Charlie Frye** (0–6)	None	1,000	46–94
141	September 17	Reds	1–2	Whitey Moore (8–7)	**Kirby Higbe** (13–18)	None	1,197	46–95
142	September 18	Reds	3–4 (13)	Johnny Vander Meer (2–0)	**Hugh Mulcahy** (12–21)	Joe Beggs (7)	2,093	46–96
143	September 19	Reds	1–4	Paul Derringer (20–12)	**Johnny Podgajny** (0–2)	None	1,094	46–97
144	September 21	@ Dodgers	4–2	**Kirby Higbe** (14–18)	Luke Hamlin (9–8)	None	5,727	47–97
145	September 22 (1)^{^{[e]}}	@ Dodgers	2–10	Freddie Fitzsimmons (16–2)	**Si Johnson** (5–13)	None	see 2nd game	47–98
146	September 22 (2)^{^{[e]}}	@ Dodgers	2–5 (8)	Curt Davis (8–11)	**Boom-Boom Beck** (4–9)	None	18,672	47–99
147	September 23 (1)^{^{[f]}}	@ Bees	6–2	**Johnny Podgajny** (1–2)	Manny Salvo (10–9)	None	see 2nd game	48–99
148	September 23 (2)^{^{[f]}}	@ Bees	0–8	Tom Earley (2–0)	**Hugh Mulcahy** (12–22)	None	1,650	48–100
–	September 25	@ Bees	Canceled (rain); No makeup scheduled					
149	September 26 (1)	@ Giants	1–3	Harry Gumbert (12–14)	**Kirby Higbe** (14–19)	None	see 2nd game	48–101
150	September 26 (2)	@ Giants	1–2	Bob Carpenter (2–0)	**Si Johnson** (5–14)	None	1,239	48–102
151	September 27	@ Giants	6–0	**Hugh Mulcahy** (13–22)	Carl Hubbell (11–12)	None	1,128	49–102
152	September 28	Dodgers	5–1	**Ike Pearson** (3–14)	Ed Head (1–2)	None	1,500	50–102
153	September 29	Dodgers	0–5	Lee Grissom (2–5)	**Johnny Podgajny** (1–3)	None	2,000	50–103

^{^[a]}The original schedule indicated single games on June 2 and 3 and July 18 and 19 at St. Louis which became double-headers on June 2 and July 19.
^{^[b]}The second game of a scheduled double-header on June 9, 1940, ended after eight innings due to the Pennsylvania Sunday curfew law with the score 5–11.
^{^[c]}The St. Louis Cardinals turned a double-play in the second game on July 19, 1940. Contemporary newspaper accounts, as well as Retrosheet, indicate that the Phillies protested the game, but Baseball-Reference.com does not indicate that an official protest had occurred.
^{^[d]}The original schedule indicated single games on August 9 and 11 with New York which became a double-header on August 11.
^{^[e]}The original schedule indicated single games on September 20 and 22 at Brooklyn which became a double-header on September 22.
^{^[f]}The original schedule indicated single games on September 23 and 24 at Boston which became a double-header on September 23.

=== Roster ===
1940 Philadelphia Phillies
**Roster**
**Pitchers**: 15 Boom-Boom Beck; 7,6 Cy Blanton; 28 Lloyd Brown; 33 Roy Bruner; 17 Charlie Frye; 14 Kirby Higbe; 22,8 Lefty Hoerst; 34 Si Johnson; 3 Syl Johnson; 27 Paul Masterson; 9 Hugh Mulcahy; 12 Ike Pearson; 22 Johnny Podgajny; 16 Lefty Smoll; 24 Max Wilson	**Catchers**: 5 Bill Atwood; 23 Wally Millies; 26 Bennie Warren; **Infielders**: 20 Bobby Bragan; 6 Sam File; 28 Roy Hughes; 7 George Jumonville; 4 Art Mahan; 18 Hal Marnie; 19 Pinky May; 25 Alex Monchak; 31,22,21 Heinie Mueller; 18 George Scharein; 10 Ham Schulte; 6 Gus Suhr; 17 Del Young	**Outfielders**: 24 Morrie Arnovich; 7 Stan Benjamin; 7 Wally Berger; 29 Chuck Klein; 28,4 Danny Litwhiler; 25 Hersh Martin; 35 Joe Marty; 8 Mel Mazzera; 33 Johnny Rizzo; 25 Neb Stewart; **Other batters**: 8 Ed Levy	**Manager**: 1 Doc Prothro; **Coaches**: 3 Syl Johnson; 2 Hans Lobert

== Player stats ==
=== Batting ===
==== Starters by position ====
Note: Pos = Position; G = Games played; AB = At bats; H = Hits; Avg. = Batting average; HR = Home runs; RBI = Runs batted in

Pos	Player	G	AB	H	Avg.	HR	RBI
C	Bennie Warren	106	289	71	.246	12	34
1B	Art Mahan	146	544	133	.244	2	39
2B	Ham Schulte	120	436	103	.236	1	21
SS	Bobby Bragan	132	474	105	.222	7	44
3B	Pinky May	136	501	147	.293	1	48
OF	Joe Marty	123	455	123	.270	13	50
OF	Chuck Klein	116	354	77	.218	7	37
OF	Johnny Rizzo	103	367	107	.292	20	53

==== Other batters ====
Note: G = Games played; AB = At bats; H = Hits; Avg. = Batting average; HR = Home runs; RBI = Runs batted in

Player	G	AB	H	Avg.	HR	RBI
Heinie Mueller	97	263	65	.247	3	28
Bill Atwood	78	203	39	.192	0	22
Mel Mazzera	69	156	37	.237	0	13
Danny Litwhiler	36	142	49	.345	5	17
Morrie Arnovich	39	141	28	.199	0	12
Hersh Martin	33	83	21	.253	0	5
Wally Millies	26	43	3	.070	0	0
Wally Berger	20	41	13	.317	1	5
Hal Marnie	11	34	6	.176	0	4
George Jumonville	11	34	3	.088	0	0
Del Young	15	33	8	.242	0	1
Neb Stewart	10	31	4	.129	0	0
Gus Suhr	10	25	4	.160	2	5
George Scharein	7	17	5	.294	0	0
Alex Monchak	19	14	2	.143	0	0
Sam File	7	13	1	.077	0	1
Stan Benjamin	8	9	2	.222	0	1
Ed Levy	1	1	0	.000	0	0
Roy Hughes	1	0	0	----	0	0

=== Pitching ===
==== Starting pitchers ====
Note: G = Games pitched; IP = Innings pitched; W = Wins; L = Losses; ERA = Earned run average; SO = Strikeouts

Player	G	IP	W	L	ERA	SO
Kirby Higbe	41	283.0	14	19	3.72	137
Hugh Mulcahy	36	280.0	13	22	3.60	82
Ike Pearson	29	145.1	3	14	5.45	43
Cy Blanton	13	77.0	4	3	4.32	24
Johnny Podgajny	4	35.0	1	3	2.83	12

==== Other pitchers ====
Note: G = Games pitched; IP = Innings pitched; W = Wins; L = Losses; ERA = Earned run average; SO = Strikeouts

Player	G	IP	W	L	ERA	SO
Si Johnson	37	138.1	5	14	4.88	58
Boom-Boom Beck	29	129.1	4	9	4.31	38
Lefty Smoll	33	109.0	2	8	5.37	31
Charlie Frye	15	50.1	0	6	4.65	18

==== Relief pitchers ====
Note: G = Games pitched; W = Wins; L = Losses; SV = Saves; ERA = Earned run average; SO = Strikeouts

Player	G	W	L	SV	ERA	SO
Lloyd Brown	18	1	3	3	6.21	16
Syl Johnson	17	2	2	2	4.20	13
Lefty Hoerst	6	1	0	0	5.25	3
Max Wilson	3	0	0	0	12.86	3
Roy Bruner	2	0	0	0	5.68	4
Paul Masterson	2	0	0	0	7.20	3
Art Mahan	1	0	0	0	0.00	0

== Farm system ==
Level	Team	League	Manager
AA	Baltimore Orioles	International League	Alphonse "Tommy" Thomas
B	Portsmouth Cubs	Piedmont League	Ray Brubaker and Cowboy McHenry
B	Pensacola Fliers	Southeastern League	Wally Dashiell
C	Ottawa/Ogdensburg Senators	Canadian–American League	Cy Morgan
D	Martinsville Manufacturers	Bi-State League	Harry Daughtry
D	Dover Orioles	Eastern Shore League	Cap Clark
D	Moultrie Packers	Georgia–Florida League	Joe Holden and George Jacobs
D	Wausau Timberjacks	Northern League	Wally Gilbert

LEAGUE CHAMPIONS: Martinsville

Ottawa franchise played first half of its schedule in Ogdensburg, New York
