= 1940 Pittsburgh Pirates season =

1940 Pittsburgh Pirates
- League: National League
- Ballpark: Forbes Field
- City: Pittsburgh, Pennsylvania
- Owners: Bill Benswanger
- Managers: Frankie Frisch
- Radio: KDKA; WWSW; Rosey Rowswell, Jack Craddock

The 1940 Pittsburgh Pirates season was the 59th season of the Pittsburgh Pirates franchise; the 54th in the National League. The Pirates finished fourth in the league standings with a record of 78–76.

== Offseason ==
- Prior to 1940 season: Billy Cox was signed as an amateur free agent by the Pirates.

== Regular season ==
=== Season standings ===
National League
Team	W	L	Pct.	GB	Home	Road
Cincinnati Reds	100	53	.654	—	55‍–‍21	45‍–‍32
Brooklyn Dodgers	88	65	.575	12	41‍–‍37	47‍–‍28
St. Louis Cardinals	84	69	.549	16	41‍–‍36	43‍–‍33
Pittsburgh Pirates	78	76	.506	22½	40‍–‍34	38‍–‍42
Chicago Cubs	75	79	.487	25½	40‍–‍37	35‍–‍42
New York Giants	72	80	.474	27½	33‍–‍43	39‍–‍37
Boston Bees	65	87	.428	34½	35‍–‍40	30‍–‍47
Philadelphia Phillies	50	103	.327	50	24‍–‍55	26‍–‍48

=== Record vs. opponents ===
1940 National League record Sources:
Team	BSN	BRO	CHC	CIN	NYG	PHI	PIT	STL
Boston	—	9–13	8–14	9–12	7–15	15–6	9–13	8–14
Brooklyn	13–9	—	10–12	8–14–1	16–5	17–5	15–7–1	9–13–1
Chicago	14–8	12–10	—	6–16	12–10	12–10	11–11	8–14
Cincinnati	12–9	14–8–1	16–6	—	15–7	15–7	16–6	12–10–1
New York	15–7	5–16	10–12	7–15	—	12–10	12–10	11–10
Philadelphia	6–15	5–17	10–12	7–15	10–12	—	6–16	6–16
Pittsburgh	13–9	7–15–1	11–11	6–16	10–12	16–6	—	15–7–1
St. Louis	14–8	13–9–1	14–8	10–12–1	10–11	16–6	7–15–1	—

=== Game log ===
1940 Game Log: 78–76 (Home: 40–34; Away: 38–42)
April: 4–6 (Home: 3–3; Away: 1–3)

#	Date	Opponent	Score	Win	Loss	Save	Attendance	Record
1	April 16	@ Cardinals	6–4	**Klinger** (1–0)	Davis	**Lanahan** (1)	16,600	1–0
2	April 22	Cubs	9–5	**Bowman** (1–0)	Passeau	**Butcher** (1)	10,461	2–0
3	April 23	Cubs	3–2	**Brown** (1–0)	French	—	4,138	3–0
4	April 24	Cubs	4–9	Lee	**Butcher** (0–1)	—	3,809	3–1
5	April 25	Cardinals	9–10	Shoun	**Klinger** (1–1)	Russell	3,394	3–2
6	April 26	Cardinals	10–4	**Brown** (2–0)	Bowman	—	3,912	4–2
7	April 27	@ Reds	0–3	Walters	**Bowman** (1–1)	—	5,950	4–3
8	April 28	@ Reds	2–8	Thompson	**MacFayden** (0–1)	—	19,337	4–4
9	April 29	@ Reds	2–3	Derringer	**Butcher** (0–2)	—	1,549	4–5
10	April 30	Phillies	2–6	Mulcahy	**Klinger** (1–2)	—	2,015	4–6

May: 5–15 (Home: 3–8; Away: 2–7)

#	Date	Opponent	Score	Win	Loss	Save	Attendance	Record
11	May 5	Bees	1–5	Strincevich	**Brown** (2–1)	Coffman	10,992	4–7
12	May 6	Bees	7–10 (12)	Swift	**Swigart** (0–1)	Sullivan	2,142	4–8
13	May 7	Bees	9–11	Earley	**Lanning** (0–1)	Swift	2,098	4–9
14	May 8	Giants	6–10	Melton	**Klinger** (1–3)	Schumacher	3,564	4–10
15	May 9	Giants	6–17	Hubbell	**Butcher** (0–3)	—	3,492	4–11
16	May 10	@ Cubs	8–3	**Brown** (3–1)	Lee	—	3,448	5–11
17	May 11	@ Cubs	5–7	Page	**Bowman** (1–2)	—	7,211	5–12
18	May 12	@ Cubs	5–7	Olsen	**Lanahan** (0–1)	Passeau	17,955	5–13
19	May 14	@ Giants	7–2	**Klinger** (2–3)	Melton	—	4,373	6–13
20	May 15	@ Giants	2–5	Hubbell	**Brown** (3–2)	—	4,324	6–14
21	May 18	@ Bees	5–15	Piechota	**Butcher** (0–4)	—	4,264	6–15
22	May 19	@ Phillies	5–6	Johnson	**Sewell** (0–1)	—	8,981	6–16
23	May 20	@ Phillies	7–8	Hoerst	**Lanahan** (0–2)	—	1,000	6–17
24	May 22	@ Dodgers	1–3	Fitzsimmons	**Klinger** (2–4)	—	3,149	6–18
25	May 25	Cubs	12–7	**Bowman** (2–2)	French	—	2,806	7–18
26	May 26	Cubs	3–2	**Klinger** (3–4)	Lee	—	8,771	8–18
27	May 27	Reds	1–2	Beggs	**Brown** (3–3)	—	—	8–19
28	May 27	Reds	3–7	Turner	**Bauers** (0–1)	—	6,258	8–20
29	May 28	Reds	5–2	**Butcher** (1–4)	Thompson	—	1,359	9–20
30	May 29	Reds	0–4	Walters	**Bowman** (2–3)	—	2,259	9–21

June: 15–13 (Home: 7–7; Away: 8–6)

#	Date	Opponent	Score	Win	Loss	Save	Attendance	Record
31	June 2	Giants	2–1	**Klinger** (4–4)	Schumacher	**MacFayden** (1)	—	10–21
32	June 2	Giants	3–7 (8)	Melton	**Brown** (3–4)	Gumbert	18,634	10–22
33	June 3	Giants	3–4	Lohrman	**Butcher** (1–5)	—	1,987	10–23
34	June 4	Bees	14–2	**Bowman** (3–3)	Callahan	—	20,310	11–23
35	June 6	Bees	7–6	**Sewell** (1–1)	Sullivan	—	1,165	12–23
36	June 7	Phillies	10–4	**Lanning** (1–1)	Johnson	—	1,174	13–23
37	June 8	Phillies	6–5	**Heintzelman** (1–0)	Johnson	**Brown** (1)	3,055	14–23
38	June 9	Phillies	1–6	Mulcahy	**Klinger** (4–5)	—	14,450	14–24
39	June 9	Phillies	11–5 (8)	**Brown** (4–4)	Pearson	—	14,450	15–24
40	June 10	Dodgers	7–8	Fitzsimmons	**Lanahan** (0–3)	—	2,659	15–25
41	June 12	Dodgers	4–5	Wyatt	**Brown** (4–5)	—	20,179	15–26
42	June 14	@ Giants	6–8	Lohrman	**Klinger** (4–6)	Brown	5,955	15–27
43	June 15	@ Giants	1–12	Schumacher	**Bowman** (3–4)	—	5,941	15–28
44	June 16	@ Giants	5–0	**Butcher** (2–5)	Hubbell	—	34,282	16–28
45	June 16	@ Giants	5–3	**Sewell** (2–1)	Gumbert	**Heintzelman** (1)	34,282	17–28
46	June 17	@ Bees	3–5	Posedel	**Lanning** (1–2)	—	—	17–29
47	June 17	@ Bees	1–5	Piechota	**Brown** (4–6)	—	5,224	17–30
48	June 19	@ Bees	5–1	**Bowman** (4–4)	Errickson	—	1,771	18–30
49	June 20	@ Bees	8–7	**Butcher** (3–5)	Fette	**Brown** (2)	1,445	19–30
50	June 21	@ Dodgers	8–10	Fitzsimmons	**Klinger** (4–7)	Tamulis	6,106	19–31
51	June 22	@ Dodgers	7–2	**Sewell** (3–1)	Carleton	—	10,850	20–31
52	June 23	@ Dodgers	8–5	**MacFayden** (1–1)	Wyatt	**Brown** (3)	—	21–31
53	June 23	@ Dodgers	4–4 (13)			—	24,239	21–31
54	June 25	@ Phillies	9–7	**Lanning** (2–2)	Higbe	**Klinger** (1)	1,000	22–31
55	June 26	@ Phillies	2–4	Blanton	**Bowman** (4–5)	—	12,565	22–32
56	June 26	@ Phillies	11–6	**Sewell** (4–1)	Beck	**Brown** (4)	12,565	23–32
57	June 28	Cardinals	2–8	McGee	**Heintzelman** (1–1)	—	20,490	23–33
58	June 30	Cardinals	0–1	Cooper	**Klinger** (4–8)	—	—	23–34
59	June 30	Cardinals	2–0	**Butcher** (4–5)	Shoun	—	25,096	24–34

July: 18–12 (Home: 7–5; Away: 11–7)

#	Date	Opponent	Score	Win	Loss	Save	Attendance	Record
60	July 1	@ Cubs	4–3 (10)	**Brown** (5–6)	Olsen	—	4,335	25–34
61	July 2	@ Cubs	0–10	Lee	**Bowman** (4–6)	—	5,120	25–35
62	July 3	@ Cubs	5–7	Passeau	**Bauers** (0–2)	—	5,678	25–36
63	July 4	@ Reds	1–9	Walters	**Klinger** (4–9)	—	—	25–37
64	July 4	@ Reds	1–3	Thompson	**Butcher** (4–6)	—	19,399	25–38
65	July 5	@ Reds	4–5	Beggs	**MacFayden** (1–2)	—	5,682	25–39
66	July 6	@ Cardinals	15–8	**Klinger** (5–9)	Russell	**Lanning** (1)	—	26–39
67	July 6	@ Cardinals	4–3 (10)	**Brown** (6–6)	Warneke	—	3,537	27–39
68	July 7	@ Cardinals	7–6	**Sewell** (5–1)	Shoun	**Lanahan** (2)	—	28–39
69	July 7	@ Cardinals	4–1	**Heintzelman** (2–1)	Cooper	—	7,303	29–39
70	July 12	Phillies	3–6	Mulcahy	**Bowman** (4–7)	—	9,042	29–40
71	July 13	Phillies	9–8	**MacFayden** (2–2)	Johnson	**Bowman** (1)	2,375	30–40
72	July 14	Dodgers	6–2	**Sewell** (6–1)	Hamlin	—	33,336	31–40
73	July 14	Dodgers	0–2	Fitzsimmons	**Heintzelman** (2–2)	—	33,336	31–41
74	July 15	Dodgers	1–10	Wyatt	**Butcher** (4–7)	—	—	31–42
75	July 15	Dodgers	4–3	**Klinger** (6–9)	Pressnell	—	12,215	32–42
76	July 16	Dodgers	5–3	**Lanning** (3–2)	Pressnell	—	2,271	33–42
77	July 18	Giants	1–6	Hubbell	**Heintzelman** (2–3)	—	25,188	33–43
78	July 19	Giants	2–5	Schumacher	**Sewell** (6–2)	Gumbert	2,481	33–44
79	July 20	Bees	17–6	**Brown** (7–6)	Errickson	—	2,661	34–44
80	July 21	Bees	5–3	**Lanahan** (1–3)	Salvo	**Brown** (5)	—	35–44
81	July 21	Bees	16–2 (8)	**Bowman** (5–7)	Posedel	—	11,071	36–44
82	July 23	@ Giants	1–9	Hubbell	**Klinger** (6–10)	—	12,428	36–45
83	July 25	@ Giants	2–1	**Sewell** (7–2)	Schumacher	—	3,265	37–45
84	July 26	@ Bees	9–0	**Heintzelman** (3–3)	Posedel	—	1,093	38–45
85	July 27	@ Bees	10–4	**MacFayden** (3–2)	Sullivan	—	1,509	39–45
86	July 28	@ Bees	5–2	**Lanahan** (2–3)	Errickson	—	—	40–45
87	July 28	@ Bees	7–3	**Butcher** (5–7)	Javery	—	5,471	41–45
88	July 29	@ Dodgers	6–7	Pressnell	**Brown** (7–7)	—	3,537	41–46
89	July 30	@ Dodgers	8–2	**Sewell** (8–2)	Head	—	19,910	42–46

August: 20–12 (Home: 15–6; Away: 5–6)

#	Date	Opponent	Score	Win	Loss	Save	Attendance	Record
90	August 1	@ Dodgers	3–8	Wyatt	**Heintzelman** (3–4)	—	—	42–47
91	August 1	@ Dodgers	7–8	Casey	**Lanahan** (2–4)	—	19,393	42–48
92	August 2	@ Phillies	5–2 (10)	**Bowman** (6–7)	Johnson	**Klinger** (2)	7,521	43–48
93	August 3	@ Phillies	8–0	**Brown** (8–7)	Higbe	—	1,000	44–48
94	August 4	@ Phillies	6–1	**Sewell** (9–2)	Mulcahy	—	—	45–48
95	August 4	@ Phillies	6–4	**Lanning** (4–2)	Frye	**Heintzelman** (2)	7,182	46–48
96	August 6	Cardinals	3–1	**Heintzelman** (4–4)	Cooper	—	8,582	47–48
97	August 7	Cardinals	10–9	**Klinger** (7–10)	Shoun	**Lanning** (2)	5,640	48–48
98	August 7	Cardinals	12–6	**Butcher** (6–7)	Lanier	**Bowman** (2)	5,640	49–48
99	August 9	Cubs	6–2	**Sewell** (10–2)	Raffensberger	—	29,978	50–48
100	August 10	Cubs	0–1	Olsen	**Klinger** (7–11)	—	4,474	50–49
101	August 11	Cubs	7–3	**Lanning** (5–2)	Raffensberger	—	—	51–49
102	August 11	Cubs	5–1	**Lanahan** (3–4)	Passeau	—	28,968	52–49
103	August 12	Reds	4–2	**Butcher** (7–7)	Walters	—	42,254	53–49
104	August 13	Reds	3–4 (10)	Beggs	**Heintzelman** (4–5)	—	6,810	53–50
105	August 14	@ Cardinals	6–7 (11)	Shoun	**Brown** (8–8)	—	11,077	53–51
106	August 16	@ Cardinals	6–5	**Lanning** (6–2)	McGee	—	4,218	54–51
107	August 16	@ Cardinals	5–9	Warneke	**Butcher** (7–8)	—	4,218	54–52
108	August 17	@ Cubs	5–6 (13)	Passeau	**MacFayden** (3–3)	—	6,003	54–53
109	August 18	@ Cubs	1–9	French	**Sewell** (10–3)	—	7,597	54–54
110	August 19	Bees	0–3	Errickson	**Bowman** (6–8)	—	1,803	54–55
111	August 20	Bees	6–3	**Lanahan** (4–4)	Salvo	—	1,050	55–55
112	August 21	Bees	3–2	**Heintzelman** (5–5)	Coffman	—	2,281	56–55
113	August 22	Giants	4–5 (12)	Dean	**MacFayden** (3–4)	—	—	56–56
114	August 22	Giants	4–0	**Sewell** (11–3)	Melton	—	12,523	57–56
115	August 23	Giants	13–10	**Heintzelman** (6–5)	Hubbell	—	2,562	58–56
116	August 24	Giants	6–7	Hubbell	**Heintzelman** (6–6)	—	7,630	58–57
117	August 25	Dodgers	4–3	**Lanahan** (5–4)	Wyatt	—	22,257	59–57
118	August 25	Dodgers	1–8	Fitzsimmons	**Klinger** (7–12)	—	22,257	59–58
119	August 28	Phillies	5–0	**Sewell** (12–3)	Mulcahy	—	4,100	60–58
120	August 28	Phillies	5–2	**Bowman** (7–8)	Higbe	—	4,100	61–58
121	August 29	Phillies	4–0	**Brown** (9–8)	Pearson	**MacFayden** (2)	2,239	62–58

September: 16–18 (Home: 5–5; Away: 11–13)

#	Date	Opponent	Score	Win	Loss	Save	Attendance	Record
122	September 1	Cardinals	10–0	**Heintzelman** (7–6)	Shoun	—	—	63–58
123	September 1	Cardinals	5–5 (11)			—	20,945	63–58
124	September 2	Cubs	5–2	**Sewell** (13–3)	Root	—	—	64–58
125	September 2	Cubs	1–7	Olsen	**Bowman** (7–9)	—	26,120	64–59
126	September 4	@ Reds	2–3 (12)	Beggs	**Lanahan** (5–5)	—	30,543	64–60
127	September 5	@ Reds	3–6	Vander Meer	**Lanning** (6–3)	—	7,661	64–61
128	September 7	@ Cardinals	14–9	**MacFayden** (4–4)	Doyle	**Brown** (6)	2,065	65–61
129	September 8	@ Cardinals	16–14	**Lanahan** (6–5)	McGee	**Heintzelman** (3)	—	66–61
130	September 8	@ Cardinals	5–4 (5)	**Klinger** (8–12)	Warneke	**Butcher** (2)	10,718	67–61
131	September 10	@ Phillies	11–3	**Bowman** (8–9)	Mulcahy	—	—	68–61
132	September 10	@ Phillies	11–1	**Sewell** (14–3)	Frye	—	1,000	69–61
133	September 11	@ Phillies	9–3	**Brown** (10–8)	Pearson	—	2,500	70–61
134	September 12	@ Dodgers	0–7	Casey	**Heintzelman** (7–7)	—	—	70–62
135	September 12	@ Dodgers	4–7	Casey	**Lanahan** (6–6)	—	10,570	70–63
136	September 13	@ Dodgers	2–8	Head	**Klinger** (8–13)	—	2,769	70–64
137	September 14	@ Dodgers	0–5	Fitzsimmons	**Lanahan** (6–7)	—	—	70–65
138	September 14	@ Dodgers	2–4	Carleton	**Lanning** (6–4)	—	16,278	70–66
139	September 15	@ Giants	10–3	**Sewell** (15–3)	Melton	—	—	71–66
140	September 15	@ Giants	4–3	**Bowman** (9–9)	Gumbert	—	9,240	72–66
141	September 16	@ Giants	7–6	**Butcher** (8–8)	Lohrman	**Klinger** (3)	1,262	73–66
142	September 17	@ Bees	5–10	Errickson	**Lanahan** (6–8)	Strincevich	1,077	73–67
143	September 18	@ Bees	1–4	Tobin	**Bowman** (9–10)	—	2,013	73–68
144	September 19	Cardinals	1–2	McGee	**Sewell** (15–4)	—	—	73–69
145	September 19	Cardinals	2–8	Hutchinson	**Heintzelman** (7–8)	—	5,048	73–70
146	September 21	Reds	1–8	Walters	**Butcher** (8–9)	—	—	73–71
147	September 21	Reds	8–7 (10)	**MacFayden** (5–4)	Riddle	—	6,395	74–71
148	September 22	Reds	1–2	Turner	**Swigart** (0–2)	—	—	74–72
149	September 22	Reds	8–1	**Lanning** (7–4)	Vander Meer	—	14,865	75–72
150	September 23	Reds	12–9	**Heintzelman** (8–8)	Beggs	**Brown** (7)	2,098	76–72
151	September 25	@ Cubs	1–2 (11)	Lee	**Sewell** (15–5)	—	—	76–73
152	September 25	@ Cubs	4–6	Olsen	**Brown** (10–9)	Raffensberger	7,828	76–74
153	September 26	@ Cubs	7–6	**Lanning** (8–4)	Bryant	**Sewell** (1)	1,789	77–74
154	September 27	@ Reds	4–3 (10)	**Sewell** (16–5)	Moore	—	3,173	78–74
155	September 28	@ Reds	5–6	Turner	**Dietz** (0–1)	Moore	6,603	78–75
156	September 29	@ Reds	3–11	Walters	**Rambert** (0–1)	Vander Meer	13,860	78–76

Legend: = Win = Loss = Tie
Bold = Pirates team member

=== Roster ===
1940 Pittsburgh Pirates
**Roster**
**Pitchers**: 31 Russ Bauers; 21 Joe Bowman; 25 Mace Brown; 19 Max Butcher; -- Dutch Dietz; 27 Ray Harrell; 32 Ken Heintzelman; 20 Bob Klinger; 17,28 Dick Lanahan; 29 Johnny Lanning; 22 Danny MacFayden; -- Pep Rambert; 30 Rip Sewell; 26 Oad Swigart	**Catchers**: 12 Ray Berres; 11 Spud Davis; 38 Ed Fernandes; 12 Al López; 14 Ray Mueller; 38 Joe Schultz; **Infielders**: 15 Bill Brubaker; 3,5 Elbie Fletcher; 9,18 Debs Garms; 16 Frankie Gustine; 4,6 Lee Handley; 10 Ed Leip; 21 Arky Vaughan; 4,6 Pep Young	**Outfielders**: 17 Vince DiMaggio; 8,37 Bob Elliott; -- Frank Kalin; 7 Johnny Rizzo; 17,28 Maurice Van Robays; 10 Lloyd Waner; 9,18 Paul Waner; **Other batters**: 37 Fern Bell	**Manager**: 35 Frankie Frisch; **Coaches**: 34 Jake Flowers; 36 Mike Kelly; 33 Honus Wagner

== Player stats ==
=== Batting ===
==== Starters by position ====
Note: Pos = Position; G = Games played; AB = At bats; H = Hits; Avg. = Batting average; HR = Home runs; RBI = Runs batted in

Pos	Player	G	AB	H	Avg.	HR	RBI
C	Spud Davis	99	285	93	.326	5	39
1B	Elbie Fletcher	147	510	139	.273	16	104
2B	Frankie Gustine	133	524	147	.281	1	55
SS	Arky Vaughn	156	594	178	.300	7	95
3B	Lee Handley	98	302	85	.281	1	19
OF	Vince DiMaggio	110	356	103	.289	19	54
OF	Bob Elliott	148	551	161	.292	5	64
OF	Maurice Van Robays	145	572	156	.273	11	116

==== Other batters ====
Note: G = Games played; AB = At bats; H = Hits; Avg. = Batting average; HR = Home runs; RBI = Runs batted in

Player	G	AB	H	Avg.	HR	RBI
Debs Garms	103	358	127	.355	5	57
Paul Waner	89	238	69	.290	1	32
Al López	59	174	45	.259	1	24
Lloyd Waner	72	166	43	.259	0	3
Pep Young	54	136	34	.250	2	20
Bill Brubaker	38	78	15	.192	0	7
Joe Schultz Jr.	16	36	7	.194	0	4
Ed Fernandes	28	33	4	.121	0	2
Ray Berres	21	32	6	.188	0	2
Johnny Rizzo	9	28	5	.179	0	2
Ed Leip	3	5	1	.200	0	0
Ray Mueller	4	3	1	.333	0	1
Frank Kalin	3	3	0	.000	0	1
Fern Bell	6	3	0	.000	0	1

=== Pitching ===
==== Starting pitchers ====
Note: G = Games pitched; IP = Innings pitched; W = Wins; L = Losses; ERA = Earned run average; SO = Strikeouts

Player	G	IP	W	L	ERA	SO
Rip Sewell	33	189.2	16	5	2.80	60
Joe Bowman	32	187.2	9	10	4.46	57
Max Butcher	35	136.1	8	9	6.01	40

==== Other pitchers ====
Note: G = Games pitched; IP = Innings pitched; W = Wins; L = Losses; ERA = Earned run average; SO = Strikeouts

Player	G	IP	W	L	ERA	SO
Mace Brown	48	173.0	10	9	3.49	73
Ken Heintzelman	39	165.0	8	8	4.47	71
Bob Klinger	39	142.0	8	13	5.39	48
Johnny Lanning	38	115.2	8	4	4.05	42
Dick Lanahan	40	108.0	6	8	4.25	45
Danny MacFayden	35	91.1	5	4	3.55	24
Oad Swigart	7	22.1	0	2	4.43	9
Dutch Dietz	4	15.1	0	1	5.87	8
Pep Rambert	3	8.1	0	1	7.56	0

==== Relief pitchers ====
Note: G = Games pitched; W = Wins; L = Losses; SV = Saves; ERA = Earned run average; SO = Strikeouts

Player	G	W	L	SV	ERA	SO
Russ Bauers	15	0	2	0	7.63	11
Ray Harrell	3	0	0	0	8.10	3

== Farm system ==
Level	Team	League	Manager
AA	Syracuse Chiefs	International League	Dick Porter
A	Albany Senators	Eastern League	Specs Toporcer
B	Gadsden Pilots	Southeastern League	Billy Bancroft
B	Harrisburg Senators	Interstate League	Les Bell
C	Gloversville-Johnstown Glovers	Canadian–American League	Steve Yerkes and Buster Blakeney
C	Hutchinson Pirates	Western Association	Jimmy Jordan and Buzz Arlitt
D	Carthage Pirates	Arkansas–Missouri League	Buzz Arlitt
D	Fort Lauderdale Tarpons	Florida East Coast League	Herb Thomas
D	McKeesport Little Braves/Oil City Oilers	Pennsylvania State Association	Elmer Klump
D	London Pirates	PONY League	Mickey LaLange and Jimmy Jordan

LEAGUE CHAMPIONS: Fort Lauderdale
Arkansas–Missouri League folded, July 1, 1940; McKeesport franchise moved to Oil City and renamed, July 1, 1940
