= Steve Rachunok =

American baseball player

- Pitcher
- Born: December 5, 1916; Rittman, Ohio, U.S.
- Died: May 11, 2002 (aged 85); Corona, California, U.S.
- Batted: Right Threw: Right

MLB debut
- September 17, 1940, for the Brooklyn Dodgers

Last MLB appearance
- September 26, 1940, for the Brooklyn Dodgers

MLB statistics
- Win–loss record: 0–1
- Earned run average: 4.50
- Strikeouts: 10
- Stats at Baseball Reference

Teams
- Brooklyn Dodgers (1940)

Stephen Stepanovich Rachunok (a.k.a. "the Mad Russian") (December 5, 1916 – May 11, 2002), was an American professional baseball pitcher in Major League Baseball for the Brooklyn Dodgers.

A native of Rittman, Ohio, Rachunok appeared in two games during the 1940 season, one as a starter, where he pitched a complete game. His Major League Baseball (MLB) debut came on September 17, 1940, where he pitched the top of the ninth inning, surrendering 1 walk while striking out 1 as the Dodgers were defeated 5–0 by the visiting St. Louis Cardinals at Ebbets Field. His only other MLB appearance came 9 days later in the second game of a doubleheader at Ebbets Field when facing the Boston Bees surrendering 5 runs (all earned), striking out 9, while walking 4, en route to a 5–4 loss.

Rachunok died on May 11, 2002, in Corona, California.
