= Clyde Smoll =

American baseball player (1914–1985)

- Pitcher
- Born: April 17, 1914; Quakertown, Pennsylvania
- Died: August 31, 1985 (aged 71); Quakertown, Pennsylvania
- Batted: Both Threw: Left

MLB debut
- April 26, 1940, for the Philadelphia Phillies

Last MLB appearance
- September 12, 1940, for the Philadelphia Phillies

MLB statistics
- Win–loss record: 2–8
- Earned run average: 5.37
- Strikeouts: 31
- Stats at Baseball Reference

Teams
- Philadelphia Phillies (1940)

Clyde Hetrick "Lefty" Smoll (April 17, 1914 – August 31, 1985) was a professional baseball pitcher who played in Major League Baseball (MLB) for the 1940 Philadelphia Phillies.

== Biography ==
On April 26, 1940, Smoll made his major league debut, starting against the Brooklyn Dodgers, whose starting pitcher was Freddie Fitzsimmons. Smoll allowed four runs, two earned, in six innings of work, saddling him with the loss. Smoll made 33 appearances in 1940, starting nine games and going 2–8 with a 5.37 ERA. In 109 innings, he allowed 145 hits and 36 walks while striking out 31 batters. He played his final big league game on September 12.

Smoll also spent 10 seasons pitching in the minor leagues, going 79–94 in 337 games. He pitched in the minors until 1946. He managed in the minor leagues from 1948 to 1950, skippering the Rome Colonels the first two years and the West Palm Beach Indians in the last.

Smoll died in the city of his birth, Quakertown, Pennsylvania, on August 31, 1985. A son, Clyde Jr., bought the minor league Elmira Pioneers in 1986, and owned the team for a decade.
