= 1940 Boston Bees season =

1940 Boston Bees
- League: National League
- Ballpark: The Bee Hive
- City: Boston, Massachusetts
- Record: 65–87 (.428)
- League place: 7th
- Owners: J.A. Robert Quinn
- Managers: Casey Stengel
- Radio: WAAB (Jim Britt, Tom Hussey)

The 1940 Boston Bees season was the 70th season of the franchise. The Bees finished seventh in the National League with a record of 65 wins and 87 losses.

== Regular season ==
=== Season standings ===
National League
Team	W	L	Pct.	GB	Home	Road
Cincinnati Reds	100	53	.654	—	55‍–‍21	45‍–‍32
Brooklyn Dodgers	88	65	.575	12	41‍–‍37	47‍–‍28
St. Louis Cardinals	84	69	.549	16	41‍–‍36	43‍–‍33
Pittsburgh Pirates	78	76	.506	22½	40‍–‍34	38‍–‍42
Chicago Cubs	75	79	.487	25½	40‍–‍37	35‍–‍42
New York Giants	72	80	.474	27½	33‍–‍43	39‍–‍37
Boston Bees	65	87	.428	34½	35‍–‍40	30‍–‍47
Philadelphia Phillies	50	103	.327	50	24‍–‍55	26‍–‍48

=== Record vs. opponents ===
1940 National League record Sources:
Team	BSN	BRO	CHC	CIN	NYG	PHI	PIT	STL
Boston	—	9–13	8–14	9–12	7–15	15–6	9–13	8–14
Brooklyn	13–9	—	10–12	8–14–1	16–5	17–5	15–7–1	9–13–1
Chicago	14–8	12–10	—	6–16	12–10	12–10	11–11	8–14
Cincinnati	12–9	14–8–1	16–6	—	15–7	15–7	16–6	12–10–1
New York	15–7	5–16	10–12	7–15	—	12–10	12–10	11–10
Philadelphia	6–15	5–17	10–12	7–15	10–12	—	6–16	6–16
Pittsburgh	13–9	7–15–1	11–11	6–16	10–12	16–6	—	15–7–1
St. Louis	14–8	13–9–1	14–8	10–12–1	10–11	16–6	7–15–1	—

=== Notable transactions ===
- May 8, 1940: Roy Weir was purchased from the Bees by the Philadelphia Athletics.
- June 15, 1940: Tony Cuccinello was traded by the Bees to the New York Giants for Manny Salvo and Al Glossop.

=== Roster ===
1940 Boston Bees
Roster
Pitchers: 27 George Barnicle; 30 Joe Callahan; 24 Dick Coffman; 26 Tom Earley; 19 Dick Errickson; 18 Lou Fette; 34 Al Javery; 12 Art Johnson; 27,31 Frank LaManna; 28 Al Piechota; 20 Bill Posedel; 23 Manny Salvo; 25 Nick Strincevich; 21 Joe Sullivan; 23 Bill Swift; 22 Jim Tobin; 5,30 Ace Williams	Catchers: 11 Stan Andrews; 29 Ray Berres; 18 Sig Broskie; 8 Al López; 10 Phil Masi; Infielders: 5 Tony Cuccinello; 3 Al Glossop; 30 Buddy Gremp; 2 Buddy Hassett; 7 Eddie Miller; 16 Bama Rowell; 3 Les Scarsella; 1 Sibby Sisti; 12 Rabbit Warstler; 15 Whitey Wietelmann	Outfielders: 9 Johnny Cooney; 17 Bob Loane; 17 Don Manno; 8,14 Gene Moore; 14 Mel Preibisch; 6 Chet Ross; 4 Max West; 31 Claude Wilborn; Other batters: 14 Hank Majeski	Manager: 32 Casey Stengel; Coaches: 9 Johnny Cooney; 33 George Kelly

== Player stats ==
=== Batting ===
==== Starters by position ====
Note: Pos = Position; G = Games played; AB = At bats; H = Hits; Avg. = Batting average; HR = Home runs; RBI = Runs batted in

Pos	Player	G	AB	H	Avg.	HR	RBI
C	Ray Berres	85	229	44	.192	0	14
1B	Buddy Hassett	124	458	107	.234	0	27
2B	Bama Rowell	130	486	148	.305	3	58
SS	Eddie Miller	151	569	157	.276	14	79
3B	Sibby Sisti	123	459	115	.251	6	34
OF	Chet Ross	149	569	160	.281	17	89
OF	Gene Moore	103	363	106	.292	5	39
OF	Max West	139	524	137	.261	7	72

==== Other batters ====
Note: G = Games played; AB = At bats; H = Hits; Avg. = Batting average; HR = Home runs; RBI = Runs batted in

Player	G	AB	H	Avg.	HR	RBI
Johnny Cooney	108	365	116	.318	0	21
Al Glossop	60	148	35	.236	3	14
Phil Masi	63	138	27	.196	1	14
Tony Cuccinello	34	126	34	.270	0	19
Al López	36	119	35	.294	2	17
Les Scarsella	18	60	18	.300	0	8
Rabbit Warstler	33	57	12	.211	0	4
Whitey Wietelmann	35	41	8	.195	0	1
Mel Preibisch	11	40	9	.225	0	5
Stan Andrews	19	33	6	.182	0	2
Bob Loane	13	22	5	.227	0	1
Sig Broskie	11	22	6	.273	0	4
Buddy Gremp	4	9	2	.222	0	2
Don Manno	3	7	2	.286	1	4
Claude Wilborn	5	7	0	.000	0	0
Hank Majeski	3	3	0	.000	0	0

=== Pitching ===
==== Starting pitchers ====
Note: G = Games pitched; IP = Innings pitched; W = Wins; L = Losses; ERA = Earned run average; SO = Strikeouts

Player	G	IP	W	L	ERA	SO
Dick Errickson	34	236.1	12	13	3.16	34
Bill Posedel	35	233.0	12	17	4.13	86
Manny Salvo	21	160.2	10	9	3.08	60
Jim Tobin	15	96.1	7	3	3.83	29

==== Other pitchers ====
Note: G = Games pitched; IP = Innings pitched; W = Wins; L = Losses; ERA = Earned run average; SO = Strikeouts

Player	G	IP	W	L	ERA	SO
Joe Sullivan	36	177.1	10	14	3.55	64
Nick Strincevich	32	128.2	4	8	5.53	54
Al Piechota	21	61.0	2	5	5.75	18
George Barnicle	13	32.2	1	0	7.44	11
Lou Fette	7	32.1	0	5	5.57	2
Tom Earley	4	16.1	2	0	3.86	5
Joe Callahan	6	15.0	0	2	10.20	3
Hank LaManna	5	13.1	1	0	4.73	3
Art Johnson	2	6.0	0	1	10.50	1

==== Relief pitchers ====
Note: G = Games pitched; W = Wins; L = Losses; SV = Saves; ERA = Earned run average; SO = Strikeouts

Player	G	W	L	SV	ERA	SO
Dick Coffman	31	1	5	3	5.40	11
Al Javery	29	2	4	1	5.51	42
Ace Williams	5	0	0	0	16.00	5
Bill Swift	4	1	1	1	2.89	7

== Farm system ==
Level	Team	League	Manager
A	Hartford Bees	Eastern League	Jack Onslow
B	Evansville Bees	Illinois–Indiana–Iowa League	Bob Coleman
B	York Bees	Interstate League	Rudy Hulswitt
D	Owensboro Oilers	KITTY League	Hughie Wise and Harold Sueme
D	Bradford Bees	PONY League	Eddie Onslow and Vic George
