= Claude Wilborn =

American baseball player (1912–1992)

- Right fielder
- Born: September 1, 1912; Woodsdale, North Carolina, U.S.
- Died: November 13, 1992 (aged 80); Roxboro, North Carolina, U.S.
- Batted: Left Threw: Right

MLB debut
- September 8, 1940, for the Boston Bees

Last MLB appearance
- September 29, 1940, for the Boston Bees

MLB statistics
- Batting average: .000
- At-bats: 7
- Stats at Baseball Reference

Teams
- Boston Bees (1940)

Claude Edward Wilborn (September 1, 1912 – November 13, 1992) was an American Major League Baseball right fielder who played for one season. He played for the Boston Bees in five games during the 1940 season.

Wilborn and Sig Broskie were playing for the York White Roses in 1940 when they were signed in September for a trial with the Boston Bees. Manager Casey Stengel said that, during his brief period with the Braves in 1940, Wilborn "couldn't hit a balloon."
