= 1940 Cincinnati Reds season =

1940 Cincinnati Reds
- World Series champions National League champions
- League: National League
- Ballpark: Crosley Field
- City: Cincinnati
- Owners: Powel Crosley Jr.
- General managers: Warren Giles
- Managers: Bill McKechnie
- Radio: WCPO (Harry Hartman); WSAI (Roger Baker, Dick Bray)

The 1940 Cincinnati Reds season was the 58th season for the franchise. Cincinnati entered the season as the reigning National League champion, having been swept by the New York Yankees in the World Series the previous year. They would defeat the Detroit Tigers four games to three to take the World Series title.

== Offseason ==
- October 14, 1939: Hank Sauer was drafted by the Reds from the New York Yankees in the 1939 minor league draft.
- October 19, 1939: Al Simmons was released by the Reds.

== Regular season ==
Cincinnati won 100 games for the first time in franchise history. The team finished first in the National League with a record of 100–53, winning the pennant by 12 games over the Brooklyn Dodgers, and the best record in MLB. They went on to face the Detroit Tigers in the 1940 World Series, beating them in seven games. This was their first championship since 1919.

In August, back up catcher Willard Hershberger, depressed over what he felt was culpability for losing both games of a doubleheader, took his life. Coach Jimmie Wilson was added to the roster as the back up catcher. The Reds players would vote to send Hershberger's share of the World Series winnings to his mother

=== Season standings ===
National League
Team	W	L	Pct.	GB	Home	Road
Cincinnati Reds	100	53	.654	—	55‍–‍21	45‍–‍32
Brooklyn Dodgers	88	65	.575	12	41‍–‍37	47‍–‍28
St. Louis Cardinals	84	69	.549	16	41‍–‍36	43‍–‍33
Pittsburgh Pirates	78	76	.506	22½	40‍–‍34	38‍–‍42
Chicago Cubs	75	79	.487	25½	40‍–‍37	35‍–‍42
New York Giants	72	80	.474	27½	33‍–‍43	39‍–‍37
Boston Bees	65	87	.428	34½	35‍–‍40	30‍–‍47
Philadelphia Phillies	50	103	.327	50	24‍–‍55	26‍–‍48

==== Detailed record ====
Team	Home	Away	Total	Win %
National League
Brooklyn	6–5	8–3–1	14–8–1	.636
Boston	7–4	5–5	12–9	.591
Chicago	9–2	7–4	16–6	.727
New York	8–3	7–4	15–7	.682
Philadelphia	8–2	7–5	15–7	.682
Pittsburgh	10–1	6–5	16–6	.727
St. Louis	7–4–1	5–6	12–10–1	.545
	55–21	46–30	100–53	.654

Month	Games	Won	Lost	Win %
April	9	6	3	.667
May	26	19	7	.731
June	27	16	11	.593
July	28	20	8	.714
August	32	16	16	.500
September	31	23	8	.742
	153	100	53	.654

	Games	Won	Lost	Win %
Home	76	55	21	.724
Away	77	45	32	.584

==== Record vs. opponents ====
1940 National League record Sources:
Team	BSN	BRO	CHC	CIN	NYG	PHI	PIT	STL
Boston	—	9–13	8–14	9–12	7–15	15–6	9–13	8–14
Brooklyn	13–9	—	10–12	8–14–1	16–5	17–5	15–7–1	9–13–1
Chicago	14–8	12–10	—	6–16	12–10	12–10	11–11	8–14
Cincinnati	12–9	14–8–1	16–6	—	15–7	15–7	16–6	12–10–1
New York	15–7	5–16	10–12	7–15	—	12–10	12–10	11–10
Philadelphia	6–15	5–17	10–12	7–15	10–12	—	6–16	6–16
Pittsburgh	13–9	7–15–1	11–11	6–16	10–12	16–6	—	15–7–1
St. Louis	14–8	13–9–1	14–8	10–12–1	10–11	16–6	7–15–1	—

=== Notable transactions ===
- August 23, 1940: Jimmy Ripple was selected off waivers by the Reds from the Brooklyn Dodgers.

=== Roster ===
1940 Cincinnati Reds
Roster
Pitchers: 42 Red Barrett; 43 Joe Beggs; 30 Paul Derringer; 19 Lefty Guise; 40 Johnny Hutchings; 35 Whitey Moore; 41 Elmer Riddle; 37 Milt Shoffner; 39 Junior Thompson; 34 Jim Turner; 33 Johnny Vander Meer; 31 Bucky Walters	Catchers: 6 Bill Baker; 5 Willard Hershberger; 4 Ernie Lombardi; 5 Dick West; 3 Jimmie Wilson; Infielders: 11 Lonny Frey; 17 Eddie Joost; 10 Frank McCormick; 12 Billy Myers; 15 Lew Riggs; 18 Billy Werber	Outfielders: 21 Morrie Arnovich; 23 Harry Craft; 22 Mike Dejan; 21 Vince DiMaggio; 25 Lee Gamble; 24 Ival Goodman; 20 Mike McCormick; 22 Jimmy Ripple; 21 Johnny Rizzo; Other batters: 22 Wally Berger	Manager: 1 Bill McKechnie; Coaches: 2 Hank Gowdy; 3 Jimmie Wilson

== Player stats ==
= Indicates team leader

= Indicates league leader

=== Batting ===
==== Starters by position ====
Note: Pos = Position; G = Games played; AB = At bats; H = Hits; Avg. = Batting average; HR = Home runs; RBI = Runs batted in

Pos	Player	G	AB	H	Avg.	HR	RBI
C	Ernie Lombardi	109	376	120	.319	14	74
1B	Frank McCormick	155	618	191	.309	19	127
2B	Lonny Frey	150	563	150	.266	8	54
SS	Billy Myers	90	282	57	.202	5	30
3B	Billy Werber	143	584	162	.277	12	48
OF	Mike McCormick	110	417	125	.300	1	30
OF	Ival Goodman	136	519	134	.258	12	63
OF	Harry Craft	115	422	103	.244	6	48

==== Other batters ====
Note: G = Games played; AB = At bats; H = Hits; Avg. = Batting average; HR = Home runs; RBI = Runs batted in

Player	G	AB	H	Avg.	HR	RBI
Eddie Joost	88	278	60	.216	1	24
Morrie Arnovich	62	211	60	.284	0	21
Willard Hershberger	48	123	38	.309	0	26
Johnny Rizzo	31	110	31	.282	4	17
Jimmy Ripple	32	101	31	.307	4	20
Lew Riggs	41	72	21	.292	1	9
Bill Baker	27	69	15	.217	0	7
Lee Gamble	38	42	6	.143	0	0
Jimmy Wilson	16	37	9	.243	0	3
Dick West	7	28	11	.393	1	6
Mike Dejan	12	16	3	.188	0	2
Vince DiMaggio	2	4	1	.250	0	0
Wally Berger	2	2	0	.000	0	0

=== Pitching ===
==== Starting pitchers ====
Note: G = Games pitched; IP = Innings pitched; W = Wins; L = Losses; ERA = Earned run average; SO = Strikeouts

Player	G	IP	W	L	ERA	SO
Bucky Walters	36	305.0	22	10	2.48	115
Paul Derringer	37	296.2	20	12	3.06	115
Gene Thompson	33	225.1	16	9	3.32	103
Jim Turner	24	187.0	14	7	2.89	53

==== Other pitchers ====
Note: G = Games pitched; IP = Innings pitched; W = Wins; L = Losses; ERA = Earned run average; SO = Strikeouts

Player	G	IP	W	L	ERA	SO
Whitey Moore	25	116.2	8	8	3.63	60
Johnny Hutchings	19	54.0	2	1	3.50	18
Johnny Vander Meer	10	48.0	3	1	3.75	41

==== Relief pitchers ====
Note: G = Games pitched; W = Wins; L = Losses; SV = Saves; ERA = Earned run average; SO = Strikeouts

Player	G	W	L	SV	ERA	SO
Joe Beggs	37	12	3	7	2.00	25
Milt Shoffner	20	1	0	0	5.63	17
Elmer Riddle	15	1	2	2	1.87	9
Red Barrett	3	1	0	0	6.75	0
Lefty Guise	2	0	0	0	1.17	1

== 1940 World Series ==
=== Game 1 ===
October 2, 1940, at Crosley Field in Cincinnati

Team	1	2	3	4	5	6	7	8	9	R	H	E
Detroit (A)	0	5	0	0	2	0	0	0	0	7	10	1
Cincinnati (N)	0	0	0	1	0	0	0	1	0	2	8	3
W: Bobo Newsom (1–0) L: Paul Derringer (0–1)
HR: DET – Bruce Campbell (1)
Attendance: 31,739

=== Game 2 ===
October 3, 1940, at Crosley Field in Cincinnati

Team	1	2	3	4	5	6	7	8	9	R	H	E
Detroit (A)	2	0	0	0	0	1	0	0	0	3	3	1
Cincinnati (N)	0	2	2	1	0	0	0	0	0	5	9	0
W: Bucky Walters (1–0) L: Schoolboy Rowe (0–1)
HR: CIN – Jimmy Ripple (1)
Attendance: 30,640

=== Game 3 ===
October 4, 1940, at Briggs Stadium in Detroit

Team	1	2	3	4	5	6	7	8	9	R	H	E
Cincinnati (N)	1	0	0	0	0	0	0	1	2	4	10	1
Detroit (A)	0	0	0	1	0	0	4	2	x	7	13	1
W: Tommy Bridges (1–0) L: Jim Turner (0–1)
HR: : DET – Rudy York (1), Pinky Higgins (1)

=== Game 4 ===
October 5, 1940, at Briggs Stadium in Detroit

Team	1	2	3	4	5	6	7	8	9	R	H	E
Cincinnati (N)	2	0	1	1	0	0	0	1	0	5	11	1
Detroit (A)	0	0	1	0	0	1	0	0	0	2	5	1
W: Paul Derringer (1–1) L: Dizzy Trout (0–1)

=== Game 5 ===
October 6, 1940, at Briggs Stadium in Detroit

Team	1	2	3	4	5	6	7	8	9	R	H	E
Cincinnati (N)	0	0	0	0	0	0	0	1	0	0	3	0
Detroit (A)	0	0	3	4	0	0	0	1	x	8	13	0
W: Bobo Newsom (2–0) L: Junior Thompson (0–1)
HR: : DET – Hank Greenberg (1)

=== Game 6 ===
October 7, 1940, at Crosley Field in Cincinnati

Team	1	2	3	4	5	6	7	8	9	R	H	E
Detroit (A)	0	0	0	0	0	0	0	0	0	0	5	0
Cincinnati (N)	2	0	0	0	0	1	0	1	x	4	10	2
W: Bucky Walters (2–0) L: Schoolboy Rowe (0–2)
HR: CIN – Bucky Walters (1)

=== Game 7 ===
October 8, 1940, at Crosley Field in Cincinnati

Team	1	2	3	4	5	6	7	8	9	R	H	E
Detroit (A)	0	0	1	0	0	0	0	0	0	1	7	0
Cincinnati (N)	0	0	0	0	0	0	2	0	x	2	7	1
W: Paul Derringer (2–1) L: Bobo Newsom (2–1)

== Farm system ==
Level	Team	League	Manager
AA	Indianapolis Indians	American Association	Wes Griffin and Jewel Ens
A1	Birmingham Barons	Southern Association	Ira Smith
B	Durham Bulls	Piedmont League	Oscar Roettger
B	Columbia Reds	Sally League	Cap Crossley
C	Tucson Cowboys	Arizona–Texas League	Lester "Pat" Patterson
C	Ogden Reds	Pioneer League	Bill McCorry
D	Troy Trojans	Alabama State League	Ellis Johnson and Harold Fehrenbacher
D	Lenoir Reds	Tar Heel League	Ray Rice

LEAGUE CHAMPIONS: Durham
