= Charlie Frye (baseball) =

American baseball player (1913–1945)

- Pitcher
- Born: July 17, 1913; Hickory, North Carolina, U.S.
- Died: May 25, 1945 (aged 31); Hickory, North Carolina, U.S.
- Batted: right Threw: right

MLB debut
- July 28, 1940, for the Philadelphia Phillies

Last MLB appearance
- September 22, 1940, for the Philadelphia Phillies

Career statistics
- Win–loss record: 0–6
- Earned run average: 4.65
- Strikeouts: 18
- Stats at Baseball Reference

Teams
- Philadelphia Phillies (1940)

Charles Andrew Frye (July 17, 1913 – May 25, 1945) was an American pitcher in Major League Baseball who played for the Philadelphia Phillies during the 1940 season. Listed at 6 ft 1 in (1.85 m), 175 lb (79 kg), he batted and threw right-handed.

Born in Hickory, North Carolina, Charlie Frye was one of many baseball players whose professional career was interrupted during World War II.

Frye started in organized baseball in 1937 for the Mooresville Moors of the Class D level North Carolina State League. He later played for Class-B Evansville (Illinois–Indiana–Iowa League, 1938), returning to Class-D with Snow Hill Billies (Coastal Plain League, 1939) and Martinsville Manufacturers (Bi-State League, 1939–40) before joining the Phillies, appearing for them in July 1940 in a span of fifteen games.

Frye posted a 0–6 record (five starts) and a 4.65 earned run average, allowing 32 runs (26 earned) on 58 hits and 26 walks while striking out 18 in 50 1/3 innings of work.

Following his majors stint, Frye returned to minor league action pitching at Class-B for Allentown (1941) and Wilmington (1942) of the Interstate League and the Statesville team (NCSL, 1942) until he went into the Army. In parts of six minor league seasons, he went 42–36 with a 3.86 ERA in 150 pitching appearances.

Shortly after being discharged in 1945, Frye died at his home of Hickory, North Carolina, at the age of 31.

== See also ==
- 1940 Philadelphia Phillies season
