= 1940 Brooklyn Dodgers season =

1940 Brooklyn Dodgers
- League: National League
- Ballpark: Ebbets Field
- City: Brooklyn, New York
- Record: 88–65 (.575)
- League place: 2nd
- Owners: James & Dearie Mulvey, Brooklyn Trust Company
- President: Larry MacPhail
- Managers: Leo Durocher
- Radio: WOR; Red Barber, Al Helfer

The 1940 Brooklyn Dodgers finished the season in second place. It was their best finish in 16 years.

== Offseason ==
- December 8, 1939: Al Todd was traded by the Dodgers to the Chicago Cubs for Gus Mancuso and Newt Kimball.
- December 26, 1939: Boze Berger was purchased by the Dodgers from the Boston Red Sox.
- February 6, 1940: Herman Franks was purchased by the Dodgers from the St. Louis Cardinals.
- February 12, 1940: Joe Vosmik was purchased by the Dodgers from the Boston Red Sox.
- Prior to 1940 season: Wally Westlake was signed as an amateur free agent by the Dodgers.

== Regular season ==
=== Season standings ===
National League
Team	W	L	Pct.	GB	Home	Road
Cincinnati Reds	100	53	.654	—	55‍–‍21	45‍–‍32
Brooklyn Dodgers	88	65	.575	12	41‍–‍37	47‍–‍28
St. Louis Cardinals	84	69	.549	16	41‍–‍36	43‍–‍33
Pittsburgh Pirates	78	76	.506	22½	40‍–‍34	38‍–‍42
Chicago Cubs	75	79	.487	25½	40‍–‍37	35‍–‍42
New York Giants	72	80	.474	27½	33‍–‍43	39‍–‍37
Boston Bees	65	87	.428	34½	35‍–‍40	30‍–‍47
Philadelphia Phillies	50	103	.327	50	24‍–‍55	26‍–‍48

=== Record vs. opponents ===
1940 National League record Sources:
Team	BSN	BRO	CHC	CIN	NYG	PHI	PIT	STL
Boston	—	9–13	8–14	9–12	7–15	15–6	9–13	8–14
Brooklyn	13–9	—	10–12	8–14–1	16–5	17–5	15–7–1	9–13–1
Chicago	14–8	12–10	—	6–16	12–10	12–10	11–11	8–14
Cincinnati	12–9	14–8–1	16–6	—	15–7	15–7	16–6	12–10–1
New York	15–7	5–16	10–12	7–15	—	12–10	12–10	11–10
Philadelphia	6–15	5–17	10–12	7–15	10–12	—	6–16	6–16
Pittsburgh	13–9	7–15–1	11–11	6–16	10–12	16–6	—	15–7–1
St. Louis	14–8	13–9–1	14–8	10–12–1	10–11	16–6	7–15–1	—

=== Notable transactions ===
- April 3, 1940: Jim Winford was purchased from the Dodgers by the St. Louis Cardinals.
- April 11, 1940: Tony Giuliani was purchased by the Dodgers from the Washington Senators.
- April 11, 1940: Al Hollingsworth was purchased from the Dodgers by the Washington Senators.
- April 28, 1940: Roy Hughes was purchased by the Dodgers from the Philadelphia Phillies.
- May 14, 1940: Goody Rosen was purchased from the Dodgers by the Pittsburgh Pirates.
- May 25, 1940: Jimmy Wasdell was purchased by the Dodgers from the Washington Senators.
- May 27, 1940: Roy Cullenbine was traded by the Dodgers to the St. Louis Browns for Joe Gallagher.
- May 29, 1940: Gene Moore was purchased from the Dodgers by the Boston Bees.
- June 12, 1940: Ernie Koy, Carl Doyle, Sam Nahem, Bert Haas and cash were traded by the Dodgers to the St. Louis Cardinals for Joe Medwick and Curt Davis.
- June 13, 1940: Ira Hutchinson was purchased from the Dodgers by the St. Louis Cardinals.
- July 30, 1940: Tuck Stainback was purchased from the Dodgers by the Detroit Tigers.
- August 2, 1940: Wes Flowers was purchased by the Dodgers from the Boston Red Sox.
- August 23, 1940: Jimmy Ripple was selected off waivers from the Dodgers by the Cincinnati Reds.

=== Roster ===
1940 Brooklyn Dodgers
Roster
Pitchers: 28 Tex Carleton; 25 Hugh Casey; 26 Curt Davis; 26 Carl Doyle; 21 Wes Ferrell; 21 Lou Fette; 14 Freddie Fitzsimmons; 20 Wes Flowers; 21 Lee Grissom; 12 Luke Hamlin; 23 Ed Head; 33 Newt Kimball; 36 Max Macon; 16 Van Mungo; 18 Tot Pressnell; 18 Steve Rachunok; 15 Vito Tamulis; 17 Whit Wyatt	Catchers: 19 Herman Franks; 27 Tony Giuliani; 10 Gus Mancuso; 9 Babe Phelps; Infielders: 4 Dolph Camilli; 3 Pete Coscarart; 2 Leo Durocher; 6 Johnny Hudson; 5 Cookie Lavagetto; 1 Pee Wee Reese; 34 Pete Reiser; 33 Don Ross	Outfielders: 30 Roy Cullenbine; 24 Joe Gallagher; 1,34 Charlie Gilbert; 20 Ernie Koy; 7,77 Joe Medwick; 1,31 Gene Moore; 32 Jimmy Ripple; 8 Joe Vosmik; 11 Dixie Walker; 29 Jimmy Wasdell	Manager: 2 Leo Durocher; Coaches: 7,77 Charlie Dressen; 16 Van Lingle Mungo; 22 Ben Tincup

== Player stats ==
=== Batting ===
==== Starters by position ====
Note: Pos = Position; G = Games played; AB = At bats; R = Runs; H = Hits; Avg. = Batting average; HR = Home runs; RBI = Runs batted in; SB = Stolen bases

Pos	Player	G	AB	R	H	Avg.	HR	RBI	SB
C	Babe Phelps	118	370	40	109	.295	13	61	2
1B	Dolph Camilli	142	512	92	147	.287	23	96	9
2B	Pete Coscarart	143	506	55	120	.237	9	58	5
3B	Cookie Lavagetto	118	448	56	115	.257	4	43	4
SS	Pee Wee Reese	84	312	58	85	.272	5	28	15
OF	Dixie Walker	143	556	75	171	.308	6	66	3
OF	Joe Medwick	106	423	62	127	.300	14	66	2
OF	Joe Vosmik	116	404	45	114	.282	1	42	0

==== Other batters ====
Note: G = Games played; AB = At bats; R = Runs; H = Hits; Avg. = Batting average; HR = Home runs; RBI = Runs batted in; SB = Stolen bases

Player	G	AB	R	H	Avg.	HR	RBI	SB
Jimmy Wasdell	77	230	35	64	.278	3	37	4
Pete Reiser	58	225	34	66	.293	3	20	2
Johnny Hudson	85	179	13	39	.218	0	19	2
Leo Durocher	62	160	10	37	.231	1	14	1
Gus Mancuso	60	144	16	33	.229	0	16	0
Charlie Gilbert	57	142	23	35	.246	2	8	0
Herman Franks	65	131	11	24	.183	1	14	2
Joe Gallagher	57	110	10	29	.264	3	16	1
Roy Cullenbine	22	61	8	11	.180	1	9	2
Ernie Koy	24	48	9	11	.229	1	8	1
Don Ross	10	38	4	11	.289	1	8	1
Gene Moore	10	26	3	7	.269	0	2	0
Jimmy Ripple	7	13	0	3	.231	0	0	0
Tony Giuliani	1	1	0	0	.000	0	0	0

=== Pitching ===
==== Starting pitchers ====
Note: G = Games pitched; GS = Games started; CG = Complete games; IP = Innings pitched; W = Wins; L = Losses; ERA = Earned run average; BB = Bases on balls; SO = Strikeouts

Player	G	GS	CG	IP	W	L	ERA	BB	SO
Whit Wyatt	37	34	16	239.1	15	14	3.46	62	124
Luke Hamlin	33	25	9	182.1	9	8	3.06	34	91
Curt Davis	22	18	9	137.0	8	7	3.81	19	46
Freddie Fitzsimmons	20	18	11	134.1	16	2	2.81	25	35
Lee Grissom	14	10	3	73.2	2	5	2.81	34	56

==== Other pitchers ====
Note: G = Games pitched; GS = Games started; CG = Complete games; IP = Innings pitched; W = Wins; L = Losses; ERA = Earned run average; BB = Bases on balls; SO = Strikeouts

Player	G	GS	CG	IP	W	L	ERA	BB	SO
Hugh Casey	44	10	5	154.0	11	8	3.62	51	53
Vito Tamulis	41	12	4	154.1	8	5	3.09	34	55
Tex Carleton	34	17	4	149.0	6	6	3.81	47	88
Tot Pressnell	24	4	1	68.1	6	5	3.69	17	21
Ed Head	13	5	2	39.1	1	2	4.12	18	13
Wes Flowers	5	2	0	21.0	1	1	3.43	10	8
Steve Rachunok	2	1	1	10.0	0	1	4.50	5	10

==== Relief pitchers ====
Note: G = Games pitched; IP = Innings pitched; W = Wins; L = Losses; SV = Saves; ERA = Earned run average; BB = Bases on balls; SO = Strikeouts

Player	G	IP	W	L	SV	ERA	BB	SO
Newt Kimball	21	33.2	3	1	1	3.21	15	21
Van Mungo	7	22.0	1	0	1	2.45	10	9
Carl Doyle	3	5.2	0	0	1	27.00	6	4
Wes Ferrell	1	4.0	0	0	0	6.75	4	4
Lou Fette	2	3.0	0	0	0	0.00	2	0
Max Macon	2	2.0	1	0	0	22.50	0	1

== Awards and honors ==
- 1940 Major League Baseball All-Star Game
  - Cookie Lavagetto starter
  - Joe Medwick starter
  - Leo Durocher reserve
  - Pete Coscarart reserve
  - Babe Phelps reserve
  - Whit Wyatt reserve

=== League top ten finishers ===
Dolph Camilli

- #3 in NL in slugging percentage (.529)
- #3 in NL in bases on balls (89)
- #4 in NL in home runs (23)
- #4 in NL in on-base percentage (.397)

Whit Wyatt

- #2 in NL in strikeouts (124)

== Farm system ==
Level	Team	League	Manager
AA	Montreal Royals	International League	Clyde Sukeforth
A1	Knoxville Smokies	Southern Association	Larry Gilbert
A	Elmira Pioneers	Eastern League	Bill Killefer
B	Durham Bulls	Piedmont League	Oscar Roettger
B	Macon Peaches	South Atlantic League	Milt Stock
B	Anniston Rams	Southeastern League	Bill Rodda
C	Grand Rapids Dodgers	Michigan State League	Burleigh Grimes
C	Dayton Wings	Middle Atlantic League	Andy Cohen
D	Greenville Lions	Alabama State League	Dick Luckey
D	Fayetteville Angels	Arkansas–Missouri League	Howard Holmes
D	Bassett Furnituremakers	Bi-State League	Einar Sorenson
D	Rayne Rice Birds	Evangeline League	Art Bartelli
D	American Pioneers	Georgia–Florida League	Bernie DeViveiros; Stew Hofferth
D	Bowling Green Barons	Kentucky–Illinois–Tennessee League	Ellis Powers
D	Landis Dodgers	North Carolina State League	Otis Carter
D	Newport Dodgers	Northeast Arkansas League	Cliff Green; Paul Chervinko
D	Superior Blues	Northern League	James Geygan
D	Johnstown Johnnies	Pennsylvania State Association	George Treadwell
D	Olean Oilers	Pennsylvania–Ontario–New York League	Jake Pitler

LEAGUE CHAMPIONS: Knoxville
