= 1940 St. Louis Cardinals season =

Major League Baseball season

1940 St. Louis Cardinals
- League: National League
- Ballpark: Sportsman's Park
- City: St. Louis, Missouri
- Record: 84–69 (.549)
- League place: 3rd
- Owners: Sam Breadon
- General managers: Branch Rickey
- Managers: Ray Blades, Mike González, Billy Southworth
- Radio: KMOX (France Laux); KWK (Johnny O'Hara, Johnny Neblett); KXOK (Alex Buchan, Ray Schmidt, Gabby Street)
- Stats: ESPN.com; Baseball Reference

The 1940 St. Louis Cardinals season was the team's 59th season in St. Louis, Missouri and 49th season in the National League. The Cardinals went 84–69 during the season and finished third in the National League.

== Regular season ==
=== Season standings ===
National League
Team	W	L	Pct.	GB	Home	Road
Cincinnati Reds	100	53	.654	—	55‍–‍21	45‍–‍32
Brooklyn Dodgers	88	65	.575	12	41‍–‍37	47‍–‍28
St. Louis Cardinals	84	69	.549	16	41‍–‍36	43‍–‍33
Pittsburgh Pirates	78	76	.506	22½	40‍–‍34	38‍–‍42
Chicago Cubs	75	79	.487	25½	40‍–‍37	35‍–‍42
New York Giants	72	80	.474	27½	33‍–‍43	39‍–‍37
Boston Bees	65	87	.428	34½	35‍–‍40	30‍–‍47
Philadelphia Phillies	50	103	.327	50	24‍–‍55	26‍–‍48

=== Record vs. opponents ===
1940 National League record Sources:
Team	BSN	BRO	CHC	CIN	NYG	PHI	PIT	STL
Boston	—	9–13	8–14	9–12	7–15	15–6	9–13	8–14
Brooklyn	13–9	—	10–12	8–14–1	16–5	17–5	15–7–1	9–13–1
Chicago	14–8	12–10	—	6–16	12–10	12–10	11–11	8–14
Cincinnati	12–9	14–8–1	16–6	—	15–7	15–7	16–6	12–10–1
New York	15–7	5–16	10–12	7–15	—	12–10	12–10	11–10
Philadelphia	6–15	5–17	10–12	7–15	10–12	—	6–16	6–16
Pittsburgh	13–9	7–15–1	11–11	6–16	10–12	16–6	—	15–7–1
St. Louis	14–8	13–9–1	14–8	10–12–1	10–11	16–6	7–15–1	—

=== Roster ===
1940 St. Louis Cardinals
Roster
Pitchers: 26 Bob Bowman; 31 Harry Brecheen; 25 Mort Cooper; 27 Curt Davis; 22 Murry Dickson; 27 Carl Doyle; 27,30 Ira Hutchinson; 25 Newt Kimball; 23 Max Lanier; 31 Gene Lillard; 29 Bill McGee; 28 Jack Russell; 24 Clyde Shoun; 21 Lon Warneke; 20 Bob Weiland; 2,32 Ernie White	Catchers: 17 Walker Cooper; 15 Bill DeLancey; 14 Mickey Owen; 16 Don Padgett; Infielders: 3 Jimmy Brown; 2 Creepy Crespi; 5 Don Gutteridge; 1 Eddie Lake; 4 Marty Marion; 6 Stu Martin; 10 Johnny Mize; 18 Joe Orengo	Outfielders: 17 Hal Epps; 28 Carden Gillenwater; 12 Johnny Hopp; 19 Red Jones; 19 Ernie Koy; 1 Pepper Martin; 7 Joe Medwick; 8 Terry Moore; 9 Enos Slaughter; 42 Harry Walker	Manager: 37 Ray Blades; 35 Mike González; 40 Billy Southworth; Coaches: 35 Mike González; 36 Buzzy Wares

== Player stats ==
=== Batting ===
==== Starters by position ====
Note: Pos = Position; G = Games played; AB = At bats; H = Hits; Avg. = Batting average; HR = Home runs; RBI = Runs batted in

Pos	Player	G	AB	H	Avg.	HR	RBI
C	Mickey Owen	117	307	81	.264	0	27
1B	Johnny Mize	155	579	182	.314	43	137
2B	Joe Orengo	129	415	119	.287	7	56
SS	Marty Marion	125	435	121	.278	3	46
3B	Stu Martin	112	369	88	.238	4	32
OF	Enos Slaughter	140	516	158	.306	17	73
OF	Ernie Koy	93	348	108	.310	8	52
OF	Terry Moore	136	537	163	.304	17	64

==== Other batters ====
Note: G = Games played; AB = At bats; H = Hits; Avg. = Batting average; HR = Home runs; RBI = Runs batted in

Player	G	AB	H	Avg.	HR	RBI
Jimmy Brown	107	454	127	.280	0	30
Don Padgett	93	240	58	.242	6	41
Pepper Martin	86	228	72	.316	3	39
Joe Medwick	37	158	48	.304	3	20
Johnny Hopp	80	152	41	.270	1	14
Don Gutteridge	69	108	29	.269	3	14
Eddie Lake	32	66	14	.212	2	7
Harry Walker	7	27	5	.185	0	6
Carden Gillenwater	7	25	4	.160	0	5
Walker Cooper	6	19	6	.316	0	2
Bill DeLancey	15	18	4	.222	0	2
Hal Epps	11	15	3	.200	0	1
Red Jones	12	11	1	.091	0	1
Creepy Crespi	3	11	3	.273	0	0

=== Pitching ===
==== Starting pitchers ====
Note: G = Games pitched; IP = Innings pitched; W = Wins; L = Losses; ERA = Earned run average; SO = Strikeouts

Player	G	IP	W	L	ERA	SO
Lon Warneke	33	232.0	16	10	3.14	85
Mort Cooper	38	230.2	11	12	3.63	95
Bill McGee	38	218.0	16	10	3.80	78
Murry Dickson	1	1.2	0	0	16.20	0

==== Other pitchers ====
Note: G = Games pitched; IP = Innings pitched; W = Wins; L = Losses; ERA = Earned run average; SO = Strikeouts

Player	G	IP	W	L	ERA	SO
Clyde Shoun	54	197.1	13	11	3.92	82
Bob Bowman	28	114.1	7	5	4.33	43
Max Lanier	35	105.0	9	6	3.34	49
Carl Doyle	21	81.0	3	3	5.89	44
Curt Davis	14	54.0	0	4	5.17	12
Ernie White	8	21.2	1	1	4.15	15
Newt Kimball	2	14.0	1	0	2.57	6
Gene Lillard	2	4.2	0	1	13.50	2

==== Relief pitchers ====
Note: G = Games pitched; W = Wins; L = Losses; SV = Saves; ERA = Earned run average; SO = Strikeouts

Player	G	W	L	SV	ERA	SO
Jack Russell	26	3	4	1	2.50	16
Ira Hutchinson	20	4	2	1	3.13	19
Harry Brecheen	3	0	0	0	0.00	4
Bob Weiland	1	0	0	0	27.00	0

== Farm system ==
Level	Team	League	Manager
AA	Columbus Red Birds	American Association	Burt Shotton
AA	Rochester Red Wings	International League	Billy Southworth, Estel Crabtree, Mike Ryba and Tony Kaufmann
AA	Sacramento Solons	Pacific Coast League	Benny Borgmann
A1	New Orleans Pelicans	Southern Association	Hal Anderson
A1	Houston Buffaloes	Texas League	Eddie Dyer
B	Decatur Commodores	Illinois–Indiana–Iowa League	Tony Kaufmann, Boyce Morrow and Lou Scoffic
B	Allentown Wings	Interstate League	Val Picinich and Bob Barr
B	Asheville Tourists	Piedmont League	Tommy West
B	Columbus Red Birds	Sally League	Clay Hopper
B	Mobile Shippers	Southeastern League	Johnny Keane
C	Albuquerque Cardinals	Arizona–Texas League	Jack Farmer
C	Kilgore Boomers	East Texas League	Jimmy Dalrymple
C	Lansing Lancers	Michigan State League	Jess Altenburg
C	Portsmouth Red Birds	Middle Atlantic League	Dutch Dorman and Walter Alston
C	Pocatello Cardinals	Pioneer League	Ken Penner
C	Springfield Cardinals	Western Association	George Silvey and Ollie Vanek
D	Johnson City Cardinals	Appalachian League	Ollie Vanek and George Silvey
D	Siloam Springs Cardinals	Arkansas–Missouri League	Herb Moore
D	Cambridge Canners	Eastern Shore League	Hugh Poland

Level	Team	League	Manager
D	Daytona Beach Islanders	Florida State League	Dickey Kerr
D	Albany Cardinals	Georgia–Florida League	Joe Cusick
D	Union City Greyhounds	KITTY League	Charles Martin
D	Williamson Red Birds	Mountain State League	Harrison Wickel
D	Cooleemee Cards	North Carolina State League	Boyce Morrow and Dutch Dorman
D	Caruthersville/Batesville Pilots	Northeast Arkansas League	Ernie Stefani
D	Duluth Dukes	Northern League	Joe Davis
D	Fostoria Red Birds	Ohio State League	Robert Jones
D	Washington Red Birds	Pennsylvania State Association	Bunny Simmons
D	Hamilton Red Wings	PONY League	Fred Lucas
D	Gastonia Cardinals	Tar Heel League	Milt Bocek
D	Worthington Cardinals	Western League	George Payne

LEAGUE CHAMPIONS: Houston, Columbus (Sally), Johnson City, Williamson

Arkansas–Missouri League folded, July 1, 1940; Caruthersville club transferred to Batesville, July 7
