= George Jumonville =

American baseball player (1917-1996)

- Jumonville in 1940
- Shortstop
- Born: May 16, 1917; Mobile, Alabama, U.S.
- Died: December 12, 1996 (aged 79); Mobile, Alabama, U.S.
- Batted: Right Threw: Right

MLB debut
- September 13, 1940, for the Philadelphia Phillies

Last MLB appearance
- May 20, 1941, for the Philadelphia Phillies

MLB statistics
- Batting average: .146
- Home runs: 1
- Runs batted in: 2
- Stats at Baseball Reference

Teams
- Philadelphia Phillies (1940–1941)

George Benedict Jumonville Jr. (May 16, 1917 – December 12, 1996) was an American professional baseball player. He played briefly in Major League Baseball (MLB) for the Philadelphia Phillies in the early 1940s.

== Biography ==
Jumonville was born in 1917 in Mobile, Alabama. His father was a nationally recognized clothing designer.

Jumonville's career in Minor League Baseball spanned 1936 to 1943, during which he played in over 650 games (records of the era are incomplete). He played for farm teams of the Cincinnati Reds, Detroit Tigers, Philadelphia Phillies, St. Louis Cardinals, and Philadelphia Athletics. He played over 250 games each as a shortstop and third baseman, and five games as a pitcher.

Jumonville was a September call-up for the Phillies in 1940, appearing in 11 games primarily as a shortstop while recording an .088 batting average (3-for-34). He was again with the Phillies during May 1941, appearing in six games primarily as a pinch hitter while batting .429 (3-for-7). The only extra-base hit of his short major-league career was a home run in his final major-league at bat, which came during a pinch-hitting appearance against Clyde Shoun of the Cardinals. In June 1941, the Phillies sent Jumonville and cash to the Cardinals organization in exchange for infielder Danny Murtaugh.

Jumonville served in the United States Navy during World War II, from April 1944 through January 1946. He died in 1996 in Mobile.

== See also ==
- List of Major League Baseball players with a home run in their final major league at bat
