= Fern Bell =

American baseball player (1913–2000)

- Outfielder
- Born: January 21, 1913; Ada, Oklahoma, U.S.
- Died: August 29, 2000 (aged 87); Rancho Mirage, California, U.S.
- Batted: Right Threw: Right

MLB debut
- April 17, 1939, for the Pittsburgh Pirates

Last MLB appearance
- May 6, 1940, for the Pittsburgh Pirates

MLB statistics
- Batting average: .283
- Triples: 8
- Runs batted in: 35
- Stats at Baseball Reference

Teams
- Pittsburgh Pirates (1939–1940)

Fernando Jerome Lee Bell (January 22, 1913 – August 29, 2000) was an American Major League Baseball outfielder who played for two seasons. He played for the Pittsburgh Pirates in 89 career games from 1939 to 1940.
