= Art Mahan =

American baseball player (1913–2010)

- First baseman
- Born: June 8, 1913; Somerville, Massachusetts, U.S.
- Died: December 7, 2010 (aged 97); Villanova, Pennsylvania, U.S.
- Batted: Left Threw: Left

MLB debut
- April 30, 1940, for the Philadelphia Phillies

Last MLB appearance
- September 29, 1940, for the Philadelphia Phillies

MLB statistics
- Batting average: .244
- Stolen bases: 4
- Runs batted in: 39
- Stats at Baseball Reference

Teams
- Philadelphia Phillies (1940)

Arthur Leo Mahan (June 8, 1913 – December 7, 2010) was an American professional baseball player, who played as a first baseman in the major leagues for the Philadelphia Phillies during the 1940 season. Born in Somerville, Massachusetts, he batted and threw left-handed.

Mahan played in the Boston Red Sox organization from 1936 until he was sold to the Phillies in April 1940. He played one season for the Phillies, and posted a .244 batting average (133-for-544) with two home runs and 39 RBI in 146 games played, including 55 runs, 24 doubles and five triples. He hit a double off the wall his first time at bat and led the Phillies in stolen bases. During World War II, Mahan served as a training officer in the United States Navy, working in training cadets. After the season, Mahan was sold back to his previous minor league team, the Little Rock Travelers of the Southern Association. He made one last minor league appearance, in 1946 for the Providence Chiefs of the class-B New England League.

A 1936 graduate of Villanova University, Mahan later became their head baseball coach from 1950 until 1972, and athletic director until 1973.

Mahan died on December 7, 2010, in Villanova, Pennsylvania at the age of 97. Up to the time of his death, he had been recognized as the fourth-oldest living Major League baseball player.
