= 1940 New York Giants (MLB) season =

1940 New York Giants
- League: National League
- Ballpark: Polo Grounds
- City: New York City
- Record: 72–80 (.474)
- League place: 6th
- Owners: Horace Stoneham
- General managers: Bill Terry
- Managers: Bill Terry
- Radio: WABC (Mel Allen, Joe Bolton)

The 1940 New York Giants season was the franchise's 58th season. The team finished in sixth place in the National League with a 72–80 record, 37 1/2 games behind the Cincinnati Reds.

== Offseason ==
- December 6, 1939: Tom Hafey was purchased from the Giants by the Atlanta Crackers.

== Regular season ==
=== Season standings ===
National League
Team	W	L	Pct.	GB	Home	Road
Cincinnati Reds	100	53	.654	—	55‍–‍21	45‍–‍32
Brooklyn Dodgers	88	65	.575	12	41‍–‍37	47‍–‍28
St. Louis Cardinals	84	69	.549	16	41‍–‍36	43‍–‍33
Pittsburgh Pirates	78	76	.506	22½	40‍–‍34	38‍–‍42
Chicago Cubs	75	79	.487	25½	40‍–‍37	35‍–‍42
New York Giants	72	80	.474	27½	33‍–‍43	39‍–‍37
Boston Bees	65	87	.428	34½	35‍–‍40	30‍–‍47
Philadelphia Phillies	50	103	.327	50	24‍–‍55	26‍–‍48

=== Record vs. opponents ===
1940 National League record Sources:
Team	BSN	BRO	CHC	CIN	NYG	PHI	PIT	STL
Boston	—	9–13	8–14	9–12	7–15	15–6	9–13	8–14
Brooklyn	13–9	—	10–12	8–14–1	16–5	17–5	15–7–1	9–13–1
Chicago	14–8	12–10	—	6–16	12–10	12–10	11–11	8–14
Cincinnati	12–9	14–8–1	16–6	—	15–7	15–7	16–6	12–10–1
New York	15–7	5–16	10–12	7–15	—	12–10	12–10	11–10
Philadelphia	6–15	5–17	10–12	7–15	10–12	—	6–16	6–16
Pittsburgh	13–9	7–15–1	11–11	6–16	10–12	16–6	—	15–7–1
St. Louis	14–8	13–9–1	14–8	10–12–1	10–11	16–6	7–15–1	—

=== Notable transactions ===
- June 15, 1940: Manny Salvo and Al Glossop were traded by the Giants to the Boston Bees for Tony Cuccinello.
- July 15, 1940: Willis Hudlin was signed as a free agent by the Giants.
- July 28, 1940: Willis Hudlin was released by the Giants.

=== Roster ===
1940 New York Giants
Roster
Pitchers: 20 Jumbo Brown; 22 Bob Carpenter; 21 Paul Dean; 10 Harry Gumbert; 11 Carl Hubbell; -- Willis Hudlin; 19 Roy Joiner; 12 Bill Lohrman; 14 Red Lynn; 15 Cliff Melton; 17 Hal Schumacher; 22 Hy Vandenberg	Catchers: 8 Harry Danning; 9 Ken O'Dea; Infielders: 27 Tony Cuccinello; 27 Al Glossop; 2 Billy Jurges; 18 Johnny McCarthy; 23 Glen Stewart; 7,24 Burgess Whitehead; 6 Mickey Witek; 5 Babe Young	Outfielders: 3 Frank Demaree; 26 Buster Maynard; 1 Jo-Jo Moore; 4 Mel Ott; 26 Johnny Rucker; 29 Bob Seeds; 9 Red Tramback	Manager: 30 Bill Terry; Coaches: 31 Travis Jackson; 32 Frank Snyder

== Player stats ==
=== Batting ===
==== Starters by position ====
Note: Pos = Position; G = Games played; AB = At bats; H = Hits; Avg. = Batting average; HR = Home runs; RBI = Runs batted in

Pos	Player	G	AB	H	Avg.	HR	RBI
C	Harry Danning	140	524	157	.300	13	91
1B	Babe Young	149	556	159	.286	17	101
2B	Tony Cuccinello	88	307	64	.208	5	36
SS	Mickey Witek	119	433	111	.256	3	31
3B	Burgess Whitehead	133	568	160	.282	4	36
OF	Mel Ott	151	536	155	.289	19	79
OF	Frank Demaree	121	460	139	.302	7	61
OF	Jo-Jo Moore	138	543	150	.276	6	46

==== Other batters ====
Note: G = Games played; AB = At bats; H = Hits; Avg. = Batting average; HR = Home runs; RBI = Runs batted in

Player	G	AB	H	Avg.	HR	RBI
Johnny Rucker	86	277	82	.296	4	23
Billy Jurges	63	214	54	.252	2	36
Bob Seeds	56	155	45	.290	4	16
Ken O'Dea	48	96	23	.240	0	12
Al Glossop	27	91	19	.209	4	8
Johnny McCarthy	51	67	16	.239	0	5
Buster Maynard	7	29	8	.276	1	2
Glen Stewart	15	29	4	.138	0	0
Red Tramback	2	4	1	.250	0	0

=== Pitching ===
==== Starting pitchers ====
Note: G = Games pitched; IP = Innings pitched; W = Wins; L = Losses; ERA = Earned run average; SO = Strikeouts

Player	G	IP	W	L	ERA	SO
Harry Gumbert	35	237.0	12	14	3.76	77
Hal Schumacher	34	227.0	13	13	3.25	123
Carl Hubbell	31	214.1	11	12	3.65	86
Bill Lohrman	31	195.0	10	15	3.78	73
Willis Hudlin	1	5.0	0	1	10.80	1

==== Other pitchers ====
Note: G = Games pitched; IP = Innings pitched; W = Wins; L = Losses; ERA = Earned run average; SO = Strikeouts

Player	G	IP	W	L	ERA	SO
Cliff Melton	37	166.2	10	11	4.91	91
Paul Dean	27	99.1	4	4	3.90	32
Bob Carpenter	5	33.0	2	0	2.73	25
Hy Vandenberg	13	32.1	1	1	3.90	17

==== Relief pitchers ====
Note: G = Games pitched; W = Wins; L = Losses; SV = Saves; ERA = Earned run average; SO = Strikeouts

Player	G	W	L	SV	ERA	SO
Jumbo Brown	41	2	4	7	3.42	31
Red Lynn	33	4	3	3	3.83	25
Roy Joiner	30	3	2	1	3.40	25

== Farm system ==
Level	Team	League	Manager
AA	Jersey City Giants	International League	Bert Niehoff
A1	Knoxville Smokies	Southern Association	Neil Caldwell and Freddie Lindstrom
B	Clinton Giants	Illinois–Indiana–Iowa League	Josh Billings
B	Richmond Colts	Piedmont League	Eddie Phillips
C	Fort Smith Giants	Western Association	Herschel Bobo
D	Milford Giants	Eastern Shore League	Bubber Jonnard
D	Salisbury Giants	North Carolina State League	Johnnie Heving
