= 1940 Chicago Cubs season =

1940 Chicago Cubs
- League: National League
- Ballpark: Wrigley Field
- City: Chicago
- Record: 75–79 (.487)
- League place: 5th
- Owners: Philip K. Wrigley
- General managers: Charles Weber
- Managers: Gabby Hartnett
- Radio: WGN (Bob Elson, Jack Brickhouse); WBBM (John Harrington, Pat Flanagan); WJJD (Charlie Grimm, Lew Fonseca); WCFL (Hal Totten, Jimmy Dudley)

The 1940 Chicago Cubs season was the 69th season of the Chicago Cubs franchise, the 65th in the National League and the 25th at Wrigley Field. The Cubs finished fifth in the National League with a record of 75–79.

== Offseason ==
- October 3, 1940: Jake Mooty was drafted by the Cubs from the Syracuse Stars in the 1939 rule 5 draft.

== Regular season ==
=== Season standings ===
National League
Team	W	L	Pct.	GB	Home	Road
Cincinnati Reds	100	53	.654	—	55‍–‍21	45‍–‍32
Brooklyn Dodgers	88	65	.575	12	41‍–‍37	47‍–‍28
St. Louis Cardinals	84	69	.549	16	41‍–‍36	43‍–‍33
Pittsburgh Pirates	78	76	.506	22½	40‍–‍34	38‍–‍42
Chicago Cubs	75	79	.487	25½	40‍–‍37	35‍–‍42
New York Giants	72	80	.474	27½	33‍–‍43	39‍–‍37
Boston Bees	65	87	.428	34½	35‍–‍40	30‍–‍47
Philadelphia Phillies	50	103	.327	50	24‍–‍55	26‍–‍48

=== Record vs. opponents ===
1940 National League record Sources:
Team	BSN	BRO	CHC	CIN	NYG	PHI	PIT	STL
Boston	—	9–13	8–14	9–12	7–15	15–6	9–13	8–14
Brooklyn	13–9	—	10–12	8–14–1	16–5	17–5	15–7–1	9–13–1
Chicago	14–8	12–10	—	6–16	12–10	12–10	11–11	8–14
Cincinnati	12–9	14–8–1	16–6	—	15–7	15–7	16–6	12–10–1
New York	15–7	5–16	10–12	7–15	—	12–10	12–10	11–10
Philadelphia	6–15	5–17	10–12	7–15	10–12	—	6–16	6–16
Pittsburgh	13–9	7–15–1	11–11	6–16	10–12	16–6	—	15–7–1
St. Louis	14–8	13–9–1	14–8	10–12–1	10–11	16–6	7–15–1	—

== Roster ==
1940 Chicago Cubs
Roster
Pitchers: 43 Julio Bonetti; 18,26 Clay Bryant; 22 Dizzy Dean; 14 Larry French; 11 Bill Lee; 25 Jake Mooty; 23 Vern Olsen; 41 Vance Page; 13 Claude Passeau; 16 Ken Raffensberger; 17 Charlie Root	Catchers: 39 Rip Collins; 2 Gabby Hartnett; 21 Clyde McCullough; 10 Al Todd; Infielders: 18 Zeke Bonura; 3 Phil Cavarretta; 6 Stan Hack; 4 Billy Herman; 15 Bobby Mattick; 5 Billy Rogell; 12 Rip Russell; 28 Bobby Sturgeon; 43 Rabbit Warstler	Outfielders: 31 Dom Dallessandro; 7 Augie Galan; 24 Jim Gleeson; 9 Hank Leiber; 8 Bill Nicholson	Manager: 2 Gabby Hartnett; Coaches: 19 Red Corriden; 20 George Uhle

== Player stats ==
=== Batting ===
==== Starters by position ====
Note: Pos = Position; G = Games played; AB = At bats; H = Hits; Avg. = Batting average; HR = Home runs; RBI = Runs batted in

Pos	Player	G	AB	H	Avg.	HR	RBI
C	Al Todd	104	381	97	.255	6	42
1B	Phil Cavarretta	65	193	54	.280	2	22
2B	Billy Herman	135	558	163	.292	5	57
SS	Bobby Mattick	128	441	96	.218	0	33
3B	Stan Hack	149	603	191	.317	8	40
OF	Bill Nicholson	135	491	146	.297	25	98
OF	Jim Gleeson	129	485	152	.313	5	61
OF	Hank Leiber	117	440	133	.302	17	86

==== Other batters ====
Note: G = Games played; AB = At bats; H = Hits; Avg. = Batting average; HR = Home runs; RBI = Runs batted in

Player	G	AB	H	Avg.	HR	RBI
Dom Dallessandro	107	287	77	.268	1	36
Rip Russell	68	215	53	.247	5	33
Augie Galan	68	209	48	.230	3	22
Zeke Bonura	49	182	48	.264	4	20
Rabbit Warstler	45	159	36	.226	1	18
Rip Collins	47	120	25	.208	1	14
Gabby Hartnett	37	64	17	.266	1	12
Billy Rogell	33	59	8	.136	1	3
Clyde McCullough	9	26	4	.154	0	1
Bobby Sturgeon	7	21	4	.190	0	2

=== Pitching ===
==== Starting pitchers ====
Note: G = Games pitched; IP = Innings pitched; W = Wins; L = Losses; ERA = Earned run average; SO = Strikeouts

Player	G	IP	W	L	ERA	SO
Claude Passeau	46	280.2	20	13	2.50	124
Larry French	40	246.0	14	14	3.29	107
Bill Lee	37	211.1	9	17	5.03	70
Dizzy Dean	10	54.0	3	3	5.17	18

==== Other pitchers ====
Note: G = Games pitched; IP = Innings pitched; W = Wins; L = Losses; ERA = Earned run average; SO = Strikeouts

Player	G	IP	W	L	ERA	SO
Vern Olsen	34	172.2	13	9	2.97	71
Ken Raffensberger	43	114.2	7	9	3.38	55
Jake Mooty	20	114.0	6	6	2.92	42
Charlie Root	36	112.0	2	4	3.86	50

==== Relief pitchers ====
Note: G = Games pitched; W = Wins; L = Losses; SV = Saves; ERA = Earned run average; SO = Strikeouts

Player	G	W	L	SV	ERA	SO
Vance Page	30	1	3	2	4.42	22
Clay Bryant	8	0	1	0	4.78	5
Julio Bonetti	1	0	0	0	20.25	0

== Farm system ==
Level	Team	League	Manager
AA	Los Angeles Angels	Pacific Coast League	Jigger Statz
A1	Tulsa Oilers	Texas League	Roy Johnson
B	Moline Plowboys	Illinois–Indiana–Iowa League	Mike Gazella
C	St. Joseph Saints	Western Association	Keith Frazier
D	Greeneville Burley Cubs	Appalachian League	Sam Alexander and Hubert Stolper

LEAGUE CHAMPIONS: St. Joseph
