= Joe Callahan (baseball) =

American baseball player (1916-1949)

- Pitcher
- Born: October 8, 1916; East Boston, Massachusetts, U.S.
- Died: May 24, 1949 (aged 32); South Boston, Massachusetts, U.S.
- Batted: Right Threw: Right

MLB debut
- September 13, 1939, for the Boston Bees

Last MLB appearance
- June 15, 1940, for the Boston Bees

MLB statistics
- Win–loss record: 1–2
- Earned run average: 6.40
- Strikeouts: 11
- Stats at Baseball Reference

Teams
- Boston Bees (1939–1940)

Joseph Thomas Callahan (October 8, 1916 – May 24, 1949) was an American professional baseball pitcher. He played parts of two seasons in Major League Baseball, 1939 and 1940, for the Boston Bees.

Callahan died on May 24, 1949, of cerebral embolism complicated by rheumatic heart disease and pneumonia.
