= Ace Williams =

American baseball player (1917-1999)

- Pitcher
- Born: March 18, 1917; Montclair, New Jersey, U.S.
- Died: September 16, 1999 (aged 82); Fort Myers, Florida, U.S.
- Batted: Right Threw: Left

MLB debut
- July 15, 1940, for the Boston Bees

Last MLB appearance
- April 22, 1946, for the Boston Braves

MLB statistics
- Win–loss record: 0–0
- Earned run average: 16.00
- Strikeouts: 5
- Games played: 6
- Innings pitched: 9
- Stats at Baseball Reference

Teams
- Boston Bees / Braves (1940, 1946)

Robert Fulton "Ace" Williams (March 18, 1917 – September 16, 1999) was an American pitcher in Major League Baseball. He played for the Boston Bees / Braves. From 1943 to 1945 Williams's baseball career was interrupted while he served in World War II with the United States Navy.
