= Frank Kalin =

American baseball player (1917–1975)

- Outfielder
- Born: October 3, 1917; Steubenville, Ohio, U.S.
- Died: January 12, 1975 (aged 57); Weirton, West Virginia, U.S.
- Batted: Right Threw: Right

MLB debut
- September 25, 1940, for the Pittsburgh Pirates

Last MLB appearance
- May 6, 1943, for the Chicago White Sox

MLB statistics
- Games: 7
- At bats: 7
- Hits: 0
- Stats at Baseball Reference

Teams
- Pittsburgh Pirates (1940); Chicago White Sox (1943)

Frank Bruno Kalin ["Fats"] (October 3, 1917 – January 12, 1975) was an American Major League Baseball outfielder. Kalin played for the Pittsburgh Pirates in 1940 and the Chicago White Sox in 1943. In 7 career games, he had no hits in 7 at-bats. He batted and threw right-handed.

From 1943 to 1945 Kalin served in the military during World War.

Kalin was born in Steubenville, Ohio and died in Weirton, West Virginia.
