= Mike Dejan =

American baseball player (1915–1953)

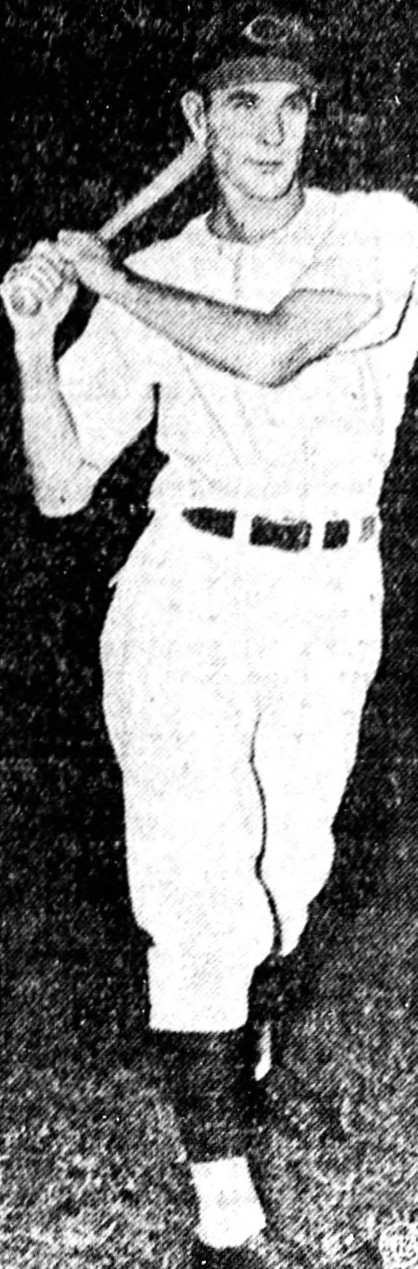
- Dejan, circa 1940
- Outfielder
- Born: January 13, 1915; Cleveland, Ohio
- Died: February 2, 1953 (aged 38); West Los Angeles, California
- Batted: Left Threw: Left

MLB debut
- July 13, 1940, for the Cincinnati Reds

Last MLB appearance
- August 12, 1940, for the Cincinnati Reds

MLB statistics
- Batting average: .188
- Home runs: 0
- Runs batted in: 2
- Stats at Baseball Reference

Teams
- Cincinnati Reds (1940)

Michael Dan Dejan (January 13, 1915 – February 2, 1953) was a professional baseball player. He was an outfielder and pinch hitter for one season (1940) with the Cincinnati Reds. For his career, he compiled a .188 batting average in 16 at-bats, with two runs batted in.

== Personal life ==
Dejan served as a sergeant in the 705th Tank Destroyer Battalion during World War II and received the Bronze Star for service in Europe. He was wounded in the leg by shrapnel in April 1945.
