= Wes Flowers =

American baseball player

- Pitcher
- Born: August 13, 1913; Vanndale, Arkansas, U.S.
- Died: December 31, 1988 (aged 75); Wynne, Arkansas, U.S.
- Batted: Left Threw: Left

MLB debut
- August 8, 1940, for the Brooklyn Dodgers

Last MLB appearance
- June 12, 1944, for the Brooklyn Dodgers

MLB statistics
- Win–loss record: 2–2
- Earned run average: 5.40
- Strikeouts: 11
- Stats at Baseball Reference

Teams
- Brooklyn Dodgers (1940, 1944)

Charles Wesley Flowers (August 13, 1913 – December 31, 1988) was an American knuckleball pitcher in Major League Baseball, appearing in 14 games for the Brooklyn Dodgers during the 1940 and 1944 seasons.

Flowers served in the Navy during World War II.
