= Neb Stewart =

American baseball player (1918-1990)

- Left fielder
- Born: May 21, 1918; South Charleston, Ohio, U.S.
- Died: June 8, 1990 (aged 72); London, Ontario, Canada
- Batted: Right Threw: Right

MLB debut
- September 8, 1940, for the Philadelphia Phillies

Last MLB appearance
- September 29, 1940, for the Philadelphia Phillies

MLB statistics
- Games played: 10
- At bats: 31
- Hits: 4
- Stats at Baseball Reference

Teams
- Philadelphia Phillies (1940)

Walter Nesbitt "Neb" Stewart (May 21, 1918 – June 8, 1990) was an American Major League Baseball left fielder who played for the Philadelphia Phillies in 1940.
