= Dick Lanahan =

American baseball player (1911–1975)

- Pitcher
- Born: September 27, 1911; Washington, D.C.
- Died: March 12, 1975 (aged 63); Rochester, Minnesota
- Batted: Left Threw: Left

MLB debut
- September 15, 1935, for the Washington Senators

Last MLB appearance
- May 12, 1941, for the Pittsburgh Pirates

MLB statistics
- Win–loss record: 6–13
- Earned run average: 5.15
- Strikeouts: 62
- Stats at Baseball Reference

Teams
- Washington Senators (1935, 1937); Pittsburgh Pirates (1940–1941)

Richard Anthony Lanahan (September 27, 1911 – March 12, 1975) was an American professional baseball pitcher. He played in Major League Baseball (MLB) for the Pittsburgh Pirates and Washington Senators in a four-year career varying from 1935 to 1941.

Lanahan's best season was the 1940 season in which he had six wins in 40 games, and a 4.25 earned run average. His forty games played was ninth in the National League.
