= Hugh Mulcahy =

American baseball player (1913–2001)

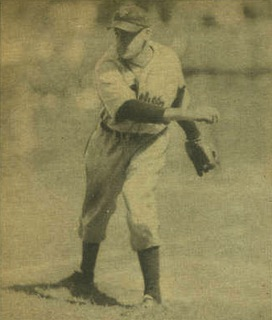
- Pitcher
- Born: September 9, 1913; Brighton, Massachusetts, U.S.
- Died: October 19, 2001 (aged 88); Aliquippa, Pennsylvania, U.S.
- Batted: Right Threw: Right

MLB debut
- July 24, 1935, for the Philadelphia Phillies

Last MLB appearance
- May 8, 1947, for the Pittsburgh Pirates

MLB statistics
- Win–loss record: 45–89
- Earned run average: 4.49
- Strikeouts: 314
- Stats at Baseball Reference

Teams
- Philadelphia Phillies (1935–1940, 1945–1946); Pittsburgh Pirates (1947)

Career highlights and awards
- All-Star (1940)

Hugh Noyes Mulcahy (September 9, 1913 – October 19, 2001), nicknamed Losing Pitcher, was an American professional baseball pitcher, who played in Major League Baseball (MLB) for the Philadelphia Phillies (1935–40 and 1945–46) and Pittsburgh Pirates (1947).

Mulcahy was born in Brighton, Massachusetts. He threw and batted right-handed; during his playing days, Mulcahy stood 6 feet 2 inches (1.88 m) tall, weighing 190 pounds (86 kg).

== Career ==
After short stints in the Class B Northeastern League and the Boston Red Sox and Washington Senators minor league farm systems, Mulcahy was signed by the Philadelphia Phillies and made his big league debut in 1935. He was named to the 1940 National League (NL) All-Star Team.

Mulcahy had the nickname of "Losing Pitcher"; because he lost 20 games in 1938 and 22 in 1940 and never had a full season in the majors in which he recorded more wins than losses. Mulcahy led the NL in earned runs allowed in 1938 and 1939.

Mulcahy also gained national distinction when he became the very first major leaguer to be drafted into United States military service before the U.S. entered World War II, on March 8, 1941. Mulcahy ended up serving over four years.

Mulcahy led the NL in games (56), walks allowed (97), and hit batsmen (7) in 1937. Despite leading the League in losses (20) and earned runs allowed (137) he finished 25th in voting for the 1938 National League Most Valuable Player award for having 10 wins, 46 games pitched in, 34 games started, 15 complete games, 8 games finished, 1 save, 267 1/3 innings pitched, 294 hits allowed, 162 runs allowed, 14 home runs allowed, 120 walks allowed, 90 strikeouts, 6 hit batters, 5 wild pitches, 1,201 batters faced, 1 balk, and a 4.61 earned run average (ERA).

Mulcahy led the NL in earned runs allowed (125), wild pitches (11), and hit batsmen (11) in 1939. Then, despite leading the NL in hits allowed (283) and losses (22), he finished 29th in voting for the 1940 NL MVP. Mulcahy also had 13 wins in 36 games (all starts), three shutouts, 280 innings pitched, and a 3.60 ERA.

In a nine-year MLB career, Mulcahy had a 45–89 win–loss record, 220 games pitched in, 143 games started, 63 complete games, 5 shutouts, 48 games finished, 9 saves, 1,161 2/3 innings pitched, 1,271 hits allowed, 695 runs allowed, 579 earned runs allowed, 69 home runs allowed, 487 walks allowed, 314 strikeouts, 39 hit batters, 36 wild pitches, 5,161 batters faced, 4 balks, and a 4.49 ERA.

In retirement, Mulcahy spent many years as a scout for the Chicago White Sox, and served one season (1970) as their pitching coach.

Mulcahy died at age 88, in Aliquippa, Pennsylvania, on October 19, 2001.

== See also ==
- Van Lingle Mungo (song)

| Preceded by Ray Berres | Chicago White Sox pitching coach 1970 | Succeeded by Johnny Sain |
