= London Pirates =

- 1940–1941; London, Ontario

Minor league affiliations
- Previous classes: Class D
- League: Pennsylvania–Ontario–New York League

Major league affiliations
- Previous teams: Pittsburgh Pirates

Team data
- Previous parks: Labatt Memorial Park

The London Pirates were a Class-D minor league baseball team based in London, Ontario, Canada. The team was a member of the Pennsylvania–Ontario–New York League, which later became the New York–Penn League. The team played for just two seasons, 1940–1941, and were affiliated with the Pittsburgh Pirates throughout its existence.
