= Chet Ross =

American baseball player (1917–1989)

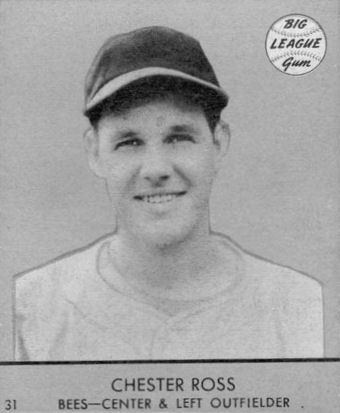
- Left fielder
- Born: April 1, 1917; Buffalo, New York, U.S.
- Died: February 21, 1989 (aged 71); Buffalo, New York, U.S.
- Batted: Right Threw: Right

MLB debut
- September 15, 1939, for the Boston Bees

Last MLB appearance
- August 4, 1944, for the Boston Braves

MLB statistics
- Batting average: .241
- Home runs: 34
- Runs batted in: 170
- Stats at Baseball Reference

Teams
- Boston Bees / Braves (1939–1944)

Chester James Ross (April 1, 1917 – February 21, 1989) was an American Major League Baseball player. He played six seasons with the Boston Bees / Braves from 1939 to 1944.
