= Sam File =

American baseball player

- Shortstop
- Born: May 18, 1922; Chester, Pennsylvania
- Died: September 25, 2008 (aged 86); Ocean Pines, Maryland
- Batted: Right Threw: Right

MLB debut
- September 10, 1940, for the Philadelphia Phillies

Last MLB appearance
- September 29, 1940, for the Philadelphia Phillies

MLB statistics
- Games played: 7
- At bats: 13
- Hits: 1
- Stats at Baseball Reference

Teams
- Philadelphia Phillies (1940)

Samuel Lawrence File (May 18, 1922 – September 25, 2008) was a shortstop in Major League Baseball. He played for the Philadelphia Phillies in 1940.
