= Bill McGee =

American baseball player (1909–1987)

- Pitcher
- Born: November 16, 1909; Batchtown, Illinois, U.S.
- Died: February 11, 1987 (aged 77); St. Louis, Missouri, U.S.
- Batted: Right Threw: Right

MLB debut
- September 29, 1935, for the St. Louis Cardinals

Last MLB appearance
- September 22, 1942, for the New York Giants

MLB statistics
- Win–loss record: 46–41
- Earned run average: 3.74
- Strikeouts: 340
- Stats at Baseball Reference

Teams
- St. Louis Cardinals (1935–1941); New York Giants (1941–1942)

William Henry "Fiddler Bill" McGee (November 16, 1909 – February 11, 1987) was an American pitcher in Major League Baseball. He played for the St. Louis Cardinals and New York Giants. His key pitch was the sinker.
