= 1940 Major League Baseball season =

1940 MLB season
- League: American League (AL); National League (NL)
- Sport: Baseball
- Duration: Regular season: April 16 – September 29, 1940; World Series: October 2–8, 1940
- Games: 154
- Teams: 16 (8 per league)

Regular season
- Season MVP: AL: Hank Greenberg (DET); NL: Frank McCormick (CIN)
- AL champions: Detroit Tigers
- AL runners-up: Cleveland Indians
- NL champions: Cincinnati Reds
- NL runners-up: Brooklyn Dodgers

World Series
- Champions: Cincinnati Reds
- Runners-up: Detroit Tigers

MLB seasons
- ← 1939 1941 →

Locations of teams for the 1940 American League season
American League
Locations of teams for the 1938–1940 National League seasons
National League

The 1940 major league baseball season began on April 16, 1940. The regular season ended on September 29, with the Cincinnati Reds and Detroit Tigers as the regular season champions of the National League and American League, respectively. The postseason began with Game 1 of the 37th World Series on October 2 and ended with Game 7 on October 8. The Reds defeated the Tigers, four games to three, capturing their second championship in franchise history, since their previous in 1919. Going into the season, the defending World Series champions were the New York Yankees from the 1939 season.

The eighth All-Star Game was held on July 9 at Sportsman's Park in St. Louis, Missouri, hosted by the St. Louis Cardinals. The National League won, 4–0.

== Schedule ==
The 1940 schedule consisted of 154 games for all teams in the American League and National League, each of which had eight teams. Each team was scheduled to play 22 games against the other seven teams of their respective league. This continued the format put in place since the 1904 season (except for 1919) and would be used until 1961 in the American League and 1962 in the National League.

Opening Day, April 16, featured all sixteen teams, the first since the 1936 season. The final day of the regular season was on September 29, which also saw all sixteen teams play, the first since the 1938 season. This was the first time since 1934 that all sixteen teams played their first and last games on the same days. The World Series took place between October 2 and October 8.

== Rule changes ==
The 1940 season saw the following rule changes:

- The scoring sacrifice fly, exempting a batter from a time at bat when a runner scored after the putout on a fly ball, was eliminated after being reimplemented the previous season, given that sacrifices nearly doubled. The sacrifice fly would be reimplemented in 1954.
- When a run scores as result of a batter hitting into a double play, he is no longer awarded a run batted in.
- In the American League, a rule attempting to curb the four-consecutive World Series winning New York Yankees was implemented, limiting any defending champion team from trading with other American League teams, except through waivers. A champion team could purchase a player outright only when the other seven teams waived such transaction. The rule would eventually be repealed following the 1941 season.

== Teams ==
An asterisk (*) denotes the ballpark a team played the minority of their home games at

League	Team	City	Ballpark	Capacity	Manager
American League	Boston Red Sox	Boston, Massachusetts	Fenway Park	33,817	Joe Cronin
American League	Chicago White Sox	Chicago, Illinois	Comiskey Park	50,000	Jimmy Dykes
American League	Cleveland Indians	Cleveland, Ohio	Cleveland Stadium	78,811	Ossie Vitt
American League	Cleveland Indians	Cleveland, Ohio	League Park*	22,500*	Ossie Vitt
American League	Detroit Tigers	Detroit, Michigan	Briggs Stadium	58,000	Del Baker
American League	New York Yankees	New York, New York	Yankee Stadium	71,699	Joe McCarthy
American League	Philadelphia Athletics	Philadelphia, Pennsylvania	Shibe Park	33,000	Connie Mack
American League	St. Louis Browns	St. Louis, Missouri	Sportsman's Park	34,023	Fred Haney
American League	Washington Senators	Washington, D.C.	Griffith Stadium	32,000	Bucky Harris
National League	Boston Bees	Boston, Massachusetts	National League Park	45,000	Casey Stengel
National League	Brooklyn Dodgers	New York, New York	Ebbets Field	35,000	Leo Durocher
National League	Chicago Cubs	Chicago, Illinois	Wrigley Field	38,000	Gabby Hartnett
National League	Cincinnati Reds	Cincinnati, Ohio	Crosley Field	29,401	Bill McKechnie
National League	New York Giants	New York, New York	Polo Grounds	56,000	Bill Terry
National League	Philadelphia Phillies	Philadelphia, Pennsylvania	Shibe Park	33,000	Doc Prothro
National League	Pittsburgh Pirates	Pittsburgh, Pennsylvania	Forbes Field	33,537	Frankie Frisch
National League	St. Louis Cardinals	St. Louis, Missouri	Sportsman's Park	34,023	Ray Blades
National League	St. Louis Cardinals	St. Louis, Missouri	Sportsman's Park	34,023	Mike González
National League	St. Louis Cardinals	St. Louis, Missouri	Sportsman's Park	34,023	Billy Southworth

== Standings ==
=== American League ===
American League
Team	W	L	Pct.	GB	Home	Road
Detroit Tigers	90	64	.584	—	50‍–‍29	40‍–‍35
Cleveland Indians	89	65	.578	1	51‍–‍30	38‍–‍35
New York Yankees	88	66	.571	2	52‍–‍24	36‍–‍42
Boston Red Sox	82	72	.532	8	45‍–‍34	37‍–‍38
Chicago White Sox	82	72	.532	8	41‍–‍36	41‍–‍36
St. Louis Browns	67	87	.435	23	37‍–‍39	30‍–‍48
Washington Senators	64	90	.416	26	36‍–‍41	28‍–‍49
Philadelphia Athletics	54	100	.351	36	29‍–‍42	25‍–‍58

=== National League ===
National League
Team	W	L	Pct.	GB	Home	Road
Cincinnati Reds	100	53	.654	—	55‍–‍21	45‍–‍32
Brooklyn Dodgers	88	65	.575	12	41‍–‍37	47‍–‍28
St. Louis Cardinals	84	69	.549	16	41‍–‍36	43‍–‍33
Pittsburgh Pirates	78	76	.506	22½	40‍–‍34	38‍–‍42
Chicago Cubs	75	79	.487	25½	40‍–‍37	35‍–‍42
New York Giants	72	80	.474	27½	33‍–‍43	39‍–‍37
Boston Bees	65	87	.428	34½	35‍–‍40	30‍–‍47
Philadelphia Phillies	50	103	.327	50	24‍–‍55	26‍–‍48

=== Tie games ===
8 tie games (3 in AL, 5 in NL), which are not factored into winning percentage or games behind (and were often replayed again) occurred throughout the season.

==== American League ====
- Chicago White Sox, 1
- Cleveland Indians, 1
- Detroit Tigers, 1
- New York Yankees, 1
- St. Louis Browns, 2

==== National League ====
- Brooklyn Dodgers, 3
- Cincinnati Reds, 2
- Pittsburgh Pirates, 2
- St. Louis Cardinals, 3

== Postseason ==
The postseason began on October 2 and ended on October 8 with the Cincinnati Reds defeating the Detroit Tigers in the 1940 World Series in seven games.

=== Bracket ===
World Series
AL	Detroit Tigers	3
NL	Cincinnati Reds	4

== Managerial changes ==
=== Off-season ===
Team	Former Manager	New Manager
Philadelphia Athletics	Earle Mack	Connie Mack
Pittsburgh Pirates	Pie Traynor	Frankie Frisch

=== In-season ===
Team	Former Manager	New Manager
St. Louis Cardinals	Ray Blades	Mike González
St. Louis Cardinals	Mike González	Billy Southworth

== League leaders ==
=== American League ===
Hitting leaders
Stat	Player	Total
AVG	Joe DiMaggio (NYY)	.352
OPS	Hank Greenberg (DET)	1.103
HR	Hank Greenberg (DET)	41
RBI	Hank Greenberg (DET)	150
R	Ted Williams (BOS)	134
H	Doc Cramer (BOS); Barney McCosky (DET); Rip Radcliff (SLB)	200
SB	George Case (WSH)	35

Pitching leaders
Stat	Player	Total
W	Bob Feller^{1} (CLE)	27
L	George Caster (PHA); Dutch Leonard (WSH)	19
ERA	Bob Feller^{1} (CLE)	2.61
K	Bob Feller^{1} (CLE)	261
IP	Bob Feller (CLE)	320.1
SV	Al Benton (DET)	17
WHIP	Bob Feller (CLE)	1.133

^{1} American League Triple Crown pitching winner

=== National League ===
Hitting leaders
Stat	Player	Total
AVG	Debs Garms (PIT)	.355
OPS	Johnny Mize (STL)	1.039
HR	Johnny Mize (STL)	43
RBI	Johnny Mize (STL)	137
R	Arky Vaughan (PIT)	113
H	Stan Hack (CHC); Frank McCormick (CIN)	191
SB	Lonny Frey (CIN)	22

Pitching leaders
Stat	Player	Total
W	Bucky Walters (CIN)	22
L	Hugh Mulcahy (PHI)	22
ERA	Bucky Walters (CIN)	2.48
K	Kirby Higbe (PHI)	137
IP	Bucky Walters (CIN)	305.0
SV	Joe Beggs (CIN); Jumbo Brown (NYG); Mace Brown (PIT)	7
WHIP	Bucky Walters (CIN)	1.092

== Milestones ==
=== Batters ===
==== Cycles ====
- Harry Craft (CIN):
  - Craft hit for his first cycle and seventh in franchise history, on June 8 against the Brooklyn Dodgers.
- Harry Danning (NYG):
  - Danning hit for his first cycle and 12th in franchise history, on June 15 against the Pittsburgh Pirates.
- Johnny Mize (STL):
  - Mize hit for his first cycle and ninth in franchise history, in game one of a doubleheader on July 13 against the New York Giants.
- Buddy Rosar (NYY):
  - Rosar hit for his first cycle and ninth in franchise history, on July 19 against the Cleveland Indians.
- Joe Cronin (BOS):
  - Cronin hit for his second cycle and seventh in franchise history, on August 2 against the Detroit Tigers.
- Joe Gordon (NYY):
  - Gordon hit for his first cycle and 10th in franchise history, on September 8 against the Boston Red Sox.

==== Other batting accomplishments ====
- Jimmie Foxx (BOS):
  - Became the second player in Major League history to hit 500 home runs in the sixth inning in game one of a doubleheader against the Philadelphia Athletics on September 24.

=== Pitchers ===
==== No-hitters ====
- Bob Feller (CLE):
  - Feller threw his first career no-hitter and sixth no-hitter in franchise history, by defeating the Chicago White Sox 1–0 on April 16. Feller walked five and struck out eight.
- Tex Carleton (BRO):
  - Carleton threw his first career no-hitter and eighth no-hitter in franchise history, by defeating the Cincinnati Reds 3–0 on April 30. Carleton walked two and struck out four.

=== Miscellaneous ===
- Brooklyn Dodgers:
  - Set a major league record for most runs scored in the 20th inning, by scoring four runs against the Boston Bees on July 5.

== Awards and honors ==
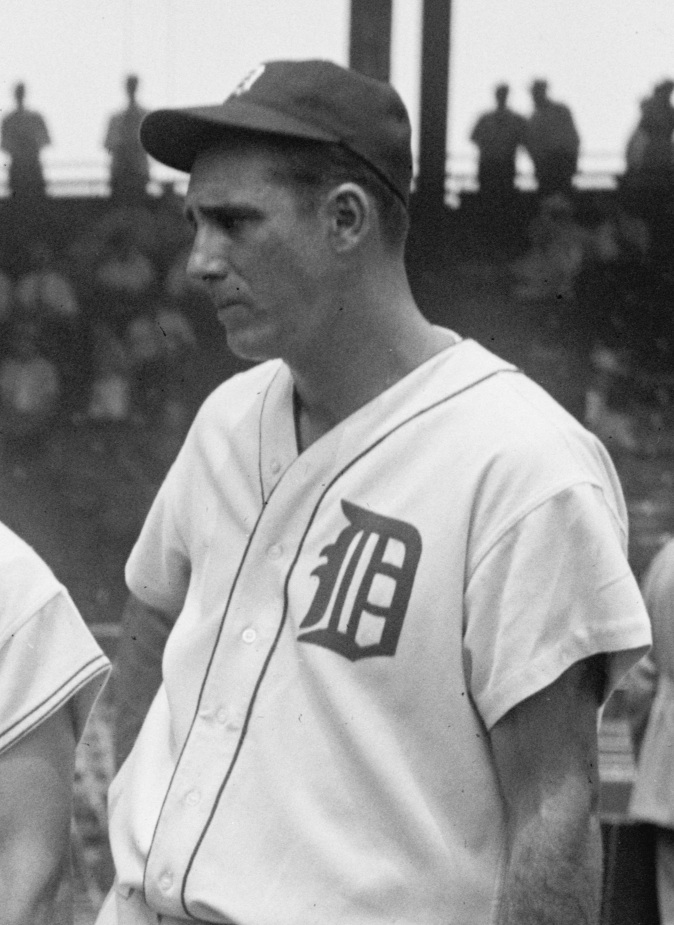
Hank Greenberg, Hall of Famer and 2-time MVP

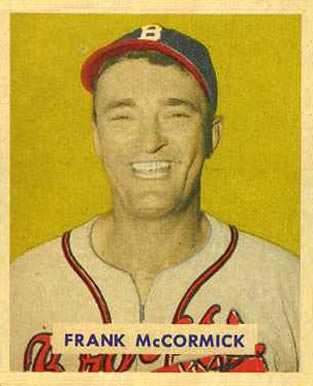
Frank McCormick 1940 NL MVP and 9x All-Star

=== Regular season ===
Baseball Writers' Association of America Awards
BBWAA Award	National League	American League
Most Valuable Player	Frank McCormick (CIN)	Hank Greenberg (DET)

=== Other awards ===
The Sporting News Awards
Award	National League	American League
Most Valuable Player	Frank McCormick (CIN)	Hank Greenberg (DET)
Player of the Year	—	Bob Feller (CLE)
Manager of the Year	Bill McKechnie (CIN)	—
Executive of the Year	—	Walter Briggs Sr. (DET)

== Home field attendance ==
Team name	Wins	%±	Home attendance	%±	Per game
Detroit Tigers	90	11.1%	1,112,693	33.1%	14,085
New York Yankees	88	−17.0%	988,975	15.0%	13,013
Brooklyn Dodgers	88	4.8%	975,978	2.1%	12,049
Cleveland Indians	89	2.3%	902,576	60.1%	11,007
Cincinnati Reds	100	3.1%	850,180	−13.4%	11,041
New York Giants	72	−6.5%	747,852	6.5%	9,840
Boston Red Sox	82	−7.9%	716,234	25.0%	9,066
Chicago White Sox	82	−3.5%	660,336	11.1%	8,466
Chicago Cubs	75	−10.7%	534,878	−26.4%	6,946
Pittsburgh Pirates	78	14.7%	507,934	34.8%	6,772
Philadelphia Athletics	54	−1.8%	432,145	9.4%	6,087
Washington Senators	64	−1.5%	381,241	12.4%	4,951
St. Louis Cardinals	84	−8.7%	324,078	−19.0%	4,209
Boston Bees	65	3.2%	241,616	−15.5%	3,222
St. Louis Browns	67	55.8%	239,591	119.5%	3,112
Philadelphia Phillies	50	11.1%	207,177	−25.5%	2,622

== Venues ==
Over 82 home games, the Cleveland Indians played 49 games at Cleveland Stadium and 33 games at League Park. All Sunday home games took place at Cleveland Stadium. This would be the 6th of 12 seasons since 1932 that saw the Indians play at both venues.

== Retired numbers ==
- Willard Hershberger had his No. 5 retired by the Cincinnati Reds, though his number would enter circulation just two years later. His number would later be re-retired to honor Johnny Bench in 1984. This was the first number retired by the team.

== See also ==
- 1940 in baseball (Events, Births, Deaths)
