= 1939 Philadelphia Phillies season =

1939 Philadelphia Phillies
- League: National League
- Ballpark: Shibe Park
- City: Philadelphia
- Owners: Gerald Nugent
- Managers: Doc Prothro
- Radio: WCAU (Bill Dyer); WIP (By Saam, Stoney McLinn)

The 1939 Philadelphia Phillies season was a season in Major League Baseball. The Phillies finished eighth in the National League with a record of 45 wins and 106 losses.

== Offseason ==
- December 7, 1938: Les Powers was purchased by the Phillies from the New York Giants.

In November 1938, the Philadelphia Phillies agreed to train in New Braunfels, Texas in 1939. New Braunfels offered to underwrite many of the team's training expenses, and the St. Louis Browns in San Antonio offered exhibition game competition. The city sent a prospectus to Phillies president Gerry Nugent which advertised, "The park at which the Phillies will train is known as Landa Park, the prettiest park in Texas." Phillies leadership inspected the town and field on December 1, 1938 and found both the field and clubhouse undergoing upgrades. The Phillies arrived in New Braunfels on February 27, 1939 and found the streets draped in bunting with signs reading, "New Braunfels, training site of the Philadelphia Phillies". The team stayed at the Faust Hotel.

== Regular season ==
=== Season standings ===
National League
Team	W	L	Pct.	GB	Home	Road
Cincinnati Reds	97	57	.630	—	55‍–‍25	42‍–‍32
St. Louis Cardinals	92	61	.601	4½	51‍–‍27	41‍–‍34
Brooklyn Dodgers	84	69	.549	12½	51‍–‍27	33‍–‍42
Chicago Cubs	84	70	.545	13	44‍–‍34	40‍–‍36
New York Giants	77	74	.510	18½	41‍–‍33	36‍–‍41
Pittsburgh Pirates	68	85	.444	28½	35‍–‍42	33‍–‍43
Boston Bees	63	88	.417	32½	37‍–‍35	26‍–‍53
Philadelphia Phillies	45	106	.298	50½	29‍–‍44	16‍–‍62

=== Record vs. opponents ===
1939 National League record Sources:
Team	BSN	BRO	CHC	CIN	NYG	PHI	PIT	STL
Boston	—	10–12–1	6–16	6–16	10–11	13–8	9–12	9–13
Brooklyn	12–10–1	—	11–11–2	10–12	12–10	17–4–1	13–9	9–13
Chicago	16–6	11–11–2	—	10–12	11–11	12–10	14–8	10–12
Cincinnati	16–6	12–10	12–10	—	11–11	19–3	16–6	11–11–2
New York	11–10	10–12	11–11	11–11	—	14–7	11–11	9–12
Philadelphia	8–13	4–17–1	10–12	3–19	7–14	—	8–14	5–17
Pittsburgh	12–9	9–13	8–14	6–16	11–11	14–8	—	8–14
St. Louis	13–9	13–9	12–10	11–11–2	12–9	17–5	14–8	—

=== Notable transactions ===
- April 5, 1939: The destitute Phillies, whose 45–105–1 record was the worst in the majors in 1938, shut down trade talks with other National League teams. Rivals are circling his roster, trying "to pick players off my club and give me cash," said first-year manager Doc Prothro. "I will only swap the equivalent in players."
- April 8, 1939: Pete Sivess and cash was traded by the Phillies to the New York Yankees for Len Gabrielson.

=== Game log ===
Legend
	Phillies win
	Phillies loss
	Phillies tie
	Postponement
**Bold**	Phillies team member

1939 Game Log
Overall Record: 45–106–1
April (4–5–1)

#	Date	Opponent	Score	Win	Loss	Save	Attendance	Record
–	April 18	@ Bees	Postponed (rain); Makeup: July 9 as a traditional double-header					
1	April 19 (1)	@ Bees	6–7 (12)	Bill Posedel (1–0)	**Max Butcher** (0–1)	None	1,501	0–1
–	April 19 (2)	@ Bees	Postponed (rain); Makeup: August 16 as a traditional double-header					
2	April 20	@ Bees	0–2	Lou Fette (1–0)	**Syl Johnson** (0–1)	None	3,166	0–2
3	April 21	Dodgers	2–2 (11)^{^{[a]}}	None	None	None	2,500	0–2–1
4	April 22	Dodgers	5–4	**Elmer Burkart** (1–0)	Red Evans (0–2)	None	3,000	1–2–1
5	April 23	Dodgers	5–4 (12)	**Boom-Boom Beck** (1–0)	Hugh Casey (0–1)	None	8,000	2–2–1
6	April 24	Giants	6–5	**Max Butcher** (1–1)	Slick Castleman (0–1)	**Boom-Boom Beck** (1)	3,000	3–2–1
7	April 25	Giants	8–1	**Claude Passeau** (1–0)	Cliff Melton (0–2)	**Jim Henry** (1)	3,500	4–2–1
–	April 26	Giants	Postponed (rain); Makeup: August 20 as a traditional double-header					
8	April 27	Bees	4–5	Danny MacFayden (2–0)	**Al Hollingsworth** (0–1)	Tom Earley (1)	8,000	4–3–1
–	April 28	Bees	Postponed (rain); Makeup: July 2 as a traditional double-header					
9	April 29	@ Dodgers	0–5	Whit Wyatt (1–0)	**Hugh Mulcahy** (0–1)	None	8,576	4–4–1
10	April 30	@ Dodgers	1–3	Luke Hamlin (3–0)	**Max Butcher** (1–2)	None	20,583	4–5–1

May (8–19)

#	Date	Opponent	Score	Win	Loss	Save	Attendance	Record
11	May 1	@ Dodgers	12–13	Whit Wyatt (2–0)	**Jim Henry** (0–1)	None	8,063	4–6–1
12	May 2	Cubs	6–1	**Syl Johnson** (1–1)	Ray Harrell (0–1)	None	1,500	5–6–1
13	May 3	Cubs	4–1	**Hugh Mulcahy** (1–1)	Earl Whitehill (1–1)	None	1,500	6–6–1
14	May 4	Pirates	4–6	Russ Bauers (1–0)	**Max Butcher** (1–3)	None	3,500	6–7–1
15	May 5	Pirates	7–10	Rip Sewell (2–1)	**Al Hollingsworth** (0–2)	Mace Brown (2)	2,000	6–8–1
16	May 6	Pirates	1–0	**Claude Passeau** (2–0)	Mace Brown (0–2)	None	7,000	7–8–1
17	May 7	Reds	4–13	Paul Derringer (3–0)	**Hugh Mulcahy** (1–2)	None	18,046	7–9–1
18	May 8	Reds	8–7	**Max Butcher** (2–3)	Johnny Vander Meer (0–1)	**Boom-Boom Beck** (2)	2,313	8–9–1
19	May 9	Reds	4–8	Lee Grissom (1–1)	**Hugh Mulcahy** (1–3)	Peaches Davis (1)	2,239	8–10–1
20	May 10	Cardinals	3–4	Lon Warneke (3–1)	**Claude Passeau** (2–1)	Bob Bowman (1)	7,000	8–11–1
–	May 11	Cardinals	Postponed (rain); Makeup: June 10 as a traditional double-header					
21	May 12	@ Giants	10–6	**Syl Johnson** (2–1)	Dick Coffman (1–1)	**Hugh Mulcahy** (1)	5,995	9–11–1
–	May 13	@ Giants	Postponed (rain); Makeup: August 13 as a traditional double-header					
22	May 14	@ Giants	1–2 (10)	Carl Hubbell (1–0)	**Max Butcher** (2–4)	None	22,485	9–12–1
23	May 16	@ Pirates	5–8	Joe Bowman (1–1)	**Claude Passeau** (2–2)	None	1,823	9–13–1
24	May 17	@ Pirates	7–3	**Hugh Mulcahy** (2–3)	Bob Klinger (2–4)	None	2,075	10–13–1
25	May 18	@ Pirates	4–5 (10)	Jim Tobin (3–2)	**Al Hollingsworth** (0–3)	None	2,183	10–14–1
26	May 19	@ Reds	3–4 (12)	Paul Derringer (4–1)	**Max Butcher** (2–5)	None	3,167	10–15–1
27	May 20	@ Reds	2–7	Whitey Moore (4–3)	**Claude Passeau** (2–3)	None	5,608	10–16–1
28	May 21	@ Cardinals	2–5	Bob Bowman (2–1)	**Hugh Mulcahy** (2–4)	None	7,663	10–17–1
29	May 22	@ Cardinals	1–2	Mort Cooper (1–1)	**Al Hollingsworth** (0–4)	Curt Davis (3)	1,065	10–18–1
30	May 23	@ Cardinals	1–6	Bill McGee (3–0)	**Max Butcher** (2–6)	None	1,347	10–19–1
31	May 24	@ Cubs	2–3	Larry French (3–2)	**Claude Passeau** (2–4)	None	4,658	10–20–1
32	May 25	@ Cubs	8–7	**Hugh Mulcahy** (3–4)	Vance Page (2–2)	**Syl Johnson** (1)	5,015	11–20–1
33	May 27	Giants	1–10	Hal Schumacher (3–3)	**Al Hollingsworth** (0–5)	None	2,500	11–21–1
34	May 28	Giants	2–7	Bill Lohrman (2–2)	**Max Butcher** (2–7)	None	4,425	11–22–1
35	May 29	Giants	5–7	Manny Salvo (2–2)	**Al Hollingsworth** (0–6)	None	3,000	11–23–1
36	May 30 (1)	Bees	7–9 (10)	Joe Sullivan (1–1)	**Boom-Boom Beck** (1–1)	None	see 2nd game	11–24–1
37	May 30 (2)	Bees	5–3	**Syl Johnson** (3–1)	Bill Posedel (3–3)	None	19,263	12–24–1

June (7–14)

#	Date	Opponent	Score	Win	Loss	Save	Attendance	Record
38	June 1	Pirates	2–5	Rip Sewell (6–3)	**Kirby Higbe** (2–2)	None	8,000	12–25–1
39	June 3	Pirates	7–10	Mace Brown (1–2)	**Al Hollingsworth** (0–7)	Bill Swift (1)	2,000	12–26–1
40	June 4 (1)	Cubs	4–9	Jack Russell (1–0)	**Hugh Mulcahy** (3–5)	None	4,000	12–27–1
–	June 4 (2)	Cubs	Postponed (rain and Sunday curfew^{^{[b]}}); Makeup: August 27 as a traditional double-header					
41	June 5	Cubs	8–7	**Kirby Higbe** (3–2)	Larry French (4–3)	**Hugh Mulcahy** (2)	1,500	13–27–1
42	June 6	Cubs	9–8	**Boom-Boom Beck** (2–1)	Gene Lillard (2–4)	None	1,000	14–27–1
43	June 7	Reds	4–5	Whitey Moore (7–4)	**Max Butcher** (2–8)	None	3,305	14–28–1
44	June 8	Reds	2–3	Paul Derringer (8–1)	**Hugh Mulcahy** (3–6)	None	16,123	14–29–1
45	June 10 (1)	Cardinals	6–5	**Kirby Higbe** (4–2)	Clyde Shoun (0–1)	None	see 2nd game	15–29–1
46	June 10 (2)	Cardinals	5–3	**Ray Harrell** (1–2)	Bob Weiland (3–5)	**Hugh Mulcahy** (3)	7,000	16–29–1
47	June 11 (1)	Cardinals	5–4 (11)	**Boom-Boom Beck** (3–1)	Bill McGee (5–1)	None	see 2nd game	17–29–1
48	June 11 (2)	Cardinals	1–4	Lon Warneke (7–2)	**Al Hollingsworth** (0–8)	Mort Cooper (3)	17,047	17–30–1
49	June 14	@ Reds	7–10	Gene Thompson (2–1)	**Gene Schott** (0–1)	Whitey Moore (3)	5,175	17–31–1
50	June 15	@ Reds	1–4	Bucky Walters (9–4)	**Hugh Mulcahy** (3–7)	None	26,616	17–32–1
51	June 17	@ Pirates	11–2	**Syl Johnson** (4–1)	Rip Sewell (6–6)	None	3,741	18–32–1
–	June 18 (1)^{^{[c]}}	@ Pirates	Postponed (rain); Makeup: July 26 as a traditional double-header					
–	June 18 (2)^{^{[c]}}	@ Pirates	Postponed (rain); Makeup: September 17 as a traditional double-header					
–	June 20	@ Cardinals	Postponed (rain); Makeup: August 6 as a traditional double-header					
52	June 21	@ Cardinals	2–14	Curt Davis (9–6)	**Hugh Mulcahy** (3–8)	None	1,359	18–33–1
53	June 22	@ Cardinals	5–11	Mort Cooper (2–3)	**Boom-Boom Beck** (3–2)	None	1,025	18–34–1
54	June 23	@ Cubs	3–4	Bill Lee (7–8)	**Max Butcher** (2–9)	None	6,762	18–35–1
55	June 24	@ Cubs	1–0	**Hugh Mulcahy** (4–8)	Charlie Root (0–2)	None	8,574	19–35–1
56	June 25	@ Cubs	3–4	Claude Passeau (5–7)	**Kirby Higbe** (4–3)	None	14,388	19–36–1
57	June 27	@ Giants	5–13	Hal Schumacher (6–5)	**Max Butcher** (2–10)	None	6,139	19–37–1
58	June 28	@ Giants	1–7	Bill Lohrman (6–3)	**Hugh Mulcahy** (4–9)	None	6,556	19–38–1
–	June 29	@ Dodgers	Postponed (rain and wet grounds); Makeup: June 30					
–	June 30	@ Dodgers	Postponed (rain); Makeup: September 6					

July (7–23)

#	Date	Opponent	Score	Win	Loss	Save	Attendance	Record
59	July 1	Bees	0–6	Bill Posedel (7–5)	**Max Butcher** (2–11)	None	1,000	19–39–1
60	July 2 (1)	Bees	7–9	Dick Errickson (2–5)	**Boom-Boom Beck** (3–3)	Milt Shoffner (1)	see 2nd game	19–40–1
61	July 2 (2)	Bees	3–4	Johnny Lanning (3–2)	**Syl Johnson** (4–2)	Fred Frankhouse (3)	7,502	19–41–1
62	July 4 (1)	@ Dodgers	3–6	Tot Pressnell (4–3)	**Al Hollingsworth** (0–9)	None	see 2nd game	19–42–1
63	July 4 (2)	@ Dodgers	6–8	Hugh Casey (4–3)	**Ike Pearson** (0–1)	None	21,299	19–43–1
64	July 5	@ Dodgers	1–7	Freddie Fitzsimmons (2–5)	**Kirby Higbe** (4–4)	None	3,536	19–44–1
65	July 7	@ Bees	3–7	Bill Posedel (8–5)	**Boom-Boom Beck** (3–4)	None	1,768	19–45–1
66	July 8	@ Bees	0–4	Lou Fette (9–3)	**Syl Johnson** (4–3)	None	1,307	19–46–1
67	July 9 (1)	@ Bees	3–1	**Kirby Higbe** (5–4)	Danny MacFayden (6–7)	None	see 2nd game	20–46–1
68	July 9 (2)	@ Bees	7–6	**Al Hollingsworth** (1–9)	Johnny Lanning (3–3)	**Boom-Boom Beck** (3)	10,634	21–46–1
–	July 11	**1939 Major League Baseball All-Star Game at Yankee Stadium in New York**						
69	July 13	Cubs	5–7	Vance Page (4–2)	**Boom-Boom Beck** (3–5)	None	10,714	21–47–1
70	July 15	Cubs	8–5	**Syl Johnson** (5–3)	Bill Lee (9–10)	**Boom-Boom Beck** (4)	3,000	22–47–1
71	July 16 (1)	Pirates	3–2	**Hugh Mulcahy** (5–9)	Mace Brown (4–4)	None	see 2nd game	23–47–1
72	July 16 (2)	Pirates	3–7	Bob Klinger (8–9)	**Max Butcher** (2–12)	Bill Swift (2)	12,958	23–48–1
73	July 17	Pirates	4–7	Joe Bowman (6–5)	**Ray Harrell** (1–3)	None	2,500	23–49–1
74	July 18	Pirates	8–3	**Syl Johnson** (6–3)	Bill Swift (2–2)	None	6,000	24–49–1
75	July 19	Cardinals	2–4	Tom Sunkel (1–1)	**Hugh Mulcahy** (5–10)	Bob Bowman (4)	11,554	24–50–1
76	July 21 (1)^{^{[d]}}	Cardinals	16–2	**Kirby Higbe** (6–4)	Curt Davis (11–11)	None	see 2nd game	25–50–1
77	July 21 (1)^{^{[d]}}	Cardinals	0–7	Mort Cooper (6–3)	**Ike Pearson** (0–2)	None	6,000	25–51–1
78	July 22	Reds	0–2	Paul Derringer (13–4)	**Boom-Boom Beck** (3–6)	None	5,000	25–52–1
79	July 23 (1)	Reds	2–5 (11)	Gene Thompson (4–1)	**Hugh Mulcahy** (5–11)	None	see 2nd game	25–53–1
80	July 23 (2)	Reds	0–4	Whitey Moore (9–6)	**Max Butcher** (2–13)	None	23,840	25–54–1
81	July 25	@ Pirates	4–5 (10)	Bob Klinger (10–10)	**Ike Pearson** (0–3)	None	2,539	25–55–1
82	July 26 (1)^{^{[c]}}	@ Pirates	1–3	Bill Swift (4–2)	**Kirby Higbe** (6–5)	Mace Brown (6)	see 2nd game	25–56–1
83	July 26 (2)^{^{[c]}}	@ Pirates	3–5	Joe Bowman (7–5)	**Boom-Boom Beck** (3–7)	None	10,611	25–57–1
84	July 27	@ Pirates	9–8	**Ray Harrell** (2–3)	Rip Sewell (7–7)	**Kirby Higbe** (1)	2,610	26–57–1
–	July 28	@ Reds	Postponed (rain); Makeup: July 29 as a traditional double-header					
85	July 29 (1)	@ Reds	0–3	Gene Thompson (5–1)	**Hugh Mulcahy** (5–12)	None	see 2nd game	26–58–1
86	July 29 (2)	@ Reds	2–9	Whitey Moore (10–6)	**Ike Pearson** (0–4)	None	10,223	26–59–1
87	July 30 (1)	@ Reds	2–9	Bucky Walters (18–6)	**Kirby Higbe** (6–6)	None	see 2nd game	26–60–1
88	July 30 (2)	@ Reds	1–5	Johnny Vander Meer (5–8)	**Boom-Boom Beck** (3–8)	None	30,298	26–61–1

August (13–17)

#	Date	Opponent	Score	Win	Loss	Save	Attendance	Record
89	August 1	@ Cubs	2–6	Larry French (7–5)	**Kirby Higbe** (6–7)	None	7,290	26–62–1
–	August 2	@ Cubs	Postponed (rain); Makeup: September 14 as a traditional double-header					
90	August 3	@ Cubs	6–9	Bill Lee (12–10)	**Hugh Mulcahy** (5–13)	Jack Russell (3)	6,993	26–63–1
91	August 4	@ Cardinals	8–9 (13)	Bob Bowman (6–4)	**Hugh Mulcahy** (5–14)	None	1,041	26–64–1
92	August 5	@ Cardinals	1–5	Curt Davis (15–11)	**Ike Pearson** (0–5)	None	2,313	26–65–1
93	August 6 (1)	@ Cardinals	0–11	Bob Weiland (7–9)	**Kirby Higbe** (6–8)	None	see 2nd game	26–66–1
94	August 6 (2)	@ Cardinals	3–8	Mort Cooper (8–4)	**Syl Johnson** (6–4)	None	10,430	26–67–1
95	August 8	Dodgers	3–2	**Hugh Mulcahy** (6–14)	Red Evans (1–8)	None	8,250	27–67–1
96	August 10 (1)	Dodgers	0–3	Luke Hamlin (13–9)	**Boom-Boom Beck** (3–9)	None	see 2nd game	27–68–1
97	August 10 (2)	Dodgers	8–3	**Ike Pearson** (1–5)	Freddie Fitzsimmons (4–8)	None	9,000	28–68–1
98	August 11	@ Giants	2–1	**Kirby Higbe** (7–8)	Hal Schumacher (7–8)	None	5,212	29–68–1
99	August 12	@ Giants	4–3	**Hugh Mulcahy** (7–14)	Manny Salvo (4–8)	None	6,998	30–68–1
100	August 13 (1)	@ Giants	2–11	Bill Lohrman (10–8)	**Bill Kerksieck** (0–1)	None	see 2nd game	30–69–1
101	August 13 (2)	@ Giants	2–6	Carl Hubbell (7–5)	**Ray Harrell** (2–4)	None	10,853	30–70–1
102	August 15	@ Bees	4–3	**Boom-Boom Beck** (4–9)	Lou Fette (10–7)	None	1,498	31–70–1
103	August 16 (1)	@ Bees	2–9	Bill Posedel (12–9)	**Syl Johnson** (6–5)	None	see 2nd game	31–71–1
104	August 16 (2)	@ Bees	3–2	**Hugh Mulcahy** (8–14)	Danny MacFayden (7–13)	None	4,322	32–71–1
105	August 18	Giants	5–2	**Kirby Higbe** (8–8)	Bill Lohrman (10–9)	None	5,000	33–71–1
–	August 19	Giants	Postponed (rain); Makeup: September 28 as a traditional double-header					
106	August 20 (1)	Giants	4–8	Hal Schumacher (8–8)	**Boom-Boom Beck** (4–10)	None	see 2nd game	33–72–1
107	August 20 (2)	Giants	3–2	**Hugh Mulcahy** (9–14)	Carl Hubbell (7–6)	None	12,043	34–72–1
108	August 21	Reds	0–7	Johnny Niggeling (2–0)	**Ike Pearson** (1–6)	None	1,000	34–73–1
109	August 22	Reds	4–0	**Kirby Higbe** (9–8)	Gene Thompson (8–3)	None	2,450	35–73–1
110	August 23	Reds	0–3	Paul Derringer (16–7)	**Boom-Boom Beck** (4–11)	None	3,869	35–74–1
111	August 24	Cardinals	6–5	**Syl Johnson** (7–5)	Bob Weiland (8–10)	None	15,000	36–74–1
112	August 26 (1)	Cardinals	0–5	Curt Davis (18–12)	**Kirby Higbe** (9–9)	None	see 2nd game	36–75–1
113	August 26 (2)	Cardinals	4–11	Bob Bowman (10–4)	**Ike Pearson** (1–7)	Clyde Shoun (7)	12,000	36–76–1
114	August 27 (1)	Cubs	4–3	**Boom-Boom Beck** (5–11)	Bill Lee (16–11)	None	see 2nd game	37–76–1
115	August 27 (2)	Cubs	3–2	**Ray Harrell** (3–4)	Claude Passeau (12–10)	None	10,029	38–76–1
116	August 28	Cubs	3–5	Charlie Root (6–7)	**Syl Johnson** (7–6)	None	1,500	38–77–1
–	August 29	Cubs	Postponed (rain); Makeup: September 15 as a traditional double-header in Chicago					
–	August 30	Pirates	Postponed (rain and wet grounds); Makeup: August 31 as a traditional double-header					
117	August 31 (1)	Pirates	0–1	Max Butcher (5–15)	**Kirby Higbe** (9–10)	None	see 2nd game	38–78–1
118	August 31 (2)	Pirates	11–6	**Boom-Boom Beck** (6–11)	Bob Klinger (11–15)	None	8,000	39–78–1

September (6–27)

#	Date	Opponent	Score	Win	Loss	Save	Attendance	Record
119	September 1	Bees	0–6	Bill Posedel (15–9)	**Ray Harrell** (3–5)	None	8,674	39–79–1
120	September 2	Bees	3–2	**Ike Pearson** (2–7)	Hiker Moran (1–1)	**Kirby Higbe** (2)	1,500	40–79–1
121	September 3 (1)	Bees	3–4	Johnny Lanning (5–4)	**Syl Johnson** (7–7)	None	see 2nd game	40–80–1
122	September 3 (2)	Bees	2–6	Joe Sullivan (5–6)	**Hugh Mulcahy** (9–15)	None	8,081	40–81–1
123	September 4 (1)	@ Giants	0–10	Hal Schumacher (10–8)	**Kirby Higbe** (9–11)	Jumbo Brown (6)	see 2nd game	40–82–1
124	September 4 (2)	@ Giants	6–7	Jumbo Brown (4–0)	**Kirby Higbe** (9–12)	None	13,039	40–83–1
125	September 5	@ Giants	0–6	Cliff Melton (11–12)	**Ray Harrell** (3–6)	None	1,864	40–84–1
126	September 6	@ Dodgers	1–2	Luke Hamlin (17–11)	**Ike Pearson** (2–8)	None	20,133	40–85–1
127	September 8 (1)^{^{[e]}}	@ Dodgers	2–11	Bill Crouch (1–0)	**Kirby Higbe** (9–13)	None	see 2nd game	40–86–1
128	September 8 (2)^{^{[e]}}	@ Dodgers	1–3 (5)	Vito Tamulis (8–6)	**Hugh Mulcahy** (9–16)	None	9,801	40–87–1
129	September 9	@ Bees	2–1	**Boom-Boom Beck** (7–11)	Dick Errickson (4–7)	None	1,454	41–87–1
–	September 10	@ Bees	Canceled (rain and cold weather); No makeup scheduled					
130	September 12	@ Cardinals	3–4	Bob Bowman (12–5)	**Ike Pearson** (2–9)	None	1,564	41–88–1
131	September 13	@ Cardinals	9–10	Bill McGee (9–5)	**Ike Pearson** (2–10)	None	1,428	41–89–1
132	September 14 (1)	@ Cubs	1–13	Charlie Root (8–8)	**Boom-Boom Beck** (7–12)	None	see 2nd game	41–90–1
133	September 14 (2)	@ Cubs	2–5	Larry French (13–7)	**Roy Bruner** (0–1)	None	5,004	41–91–1
134	September 15 (1)	@ Cubs	9–6	**Kirby Higbe** (10–13)	Dizzy Dean (6–4)	**Syl Johnson** (2)	see 2nd game	42–91–1
135	September 15 (2)	@ Cubs	1–6	Vance Page (7–7)	**Bill Kerksieck** (0–2)	Claude Passeau (3)	4,481	42–92–1
136	September 16	@ Cubs	2–8	Bill Lee (18–13)	**Ray Harrell** (3–7)	None	4,418	42–93–1
137	September 17 (1)	@ Pirates	7–3	**Syl Johnson** (8–7)	Johnny Gee (0–1)	None	see 2nd game	43–93–1
138	September 17 (2)	@ Pirates	1–10	Bob Klinger (14–16)	**Ike Pearson** (2–11)	None	8,008	43–94–1
139	September 18	@ Pirates	4–7	Mace Brown (9–12)	**Roy Bruner** (0–2)	None	688	43–95–1
140	September 19	@ Reds	13–1	**Kirby Higbe** (11–13)	Johnny Vander Meer (5–9)	None	3,044	44–95–1
141	September 20	@ Reds	2–3	Bucky Walters (26–10)	**Boom-Boom Beck** (7–13)	None	3,581	44–96–1
142	September 21	@ Reds	3–8	Paul Derringer (23–7)	**Ike Pearson** (2–12)	None	3,251	44–97–1
143	September 23 (1)	Dodgers	4–22	Tot Pressnell (9–6)	**Kirby Higbe** (11–14)	None	see 2nd game	44–98–1
144	September 23 (2)	Dodgers	0–8	Carl Doyle (1–0)	**Ray Harrell** (3–8)	None	4,000	44–99–1
145	September 24 (1)	Dodgers	1–3	Ira Hutchinson (5–2)	**Syl Johnson** (8–8)	None	see 2nd game	44–100–1
146	September 24 (2)	Dodgers	1–6	Bill Crouch (3–0)	**Roy Bruner** (0–3)	None	7,000	44–101–1
147	September 26	Bees	5–3	**Kirby Higbe** (12–14)	Jim Turner (4–11)	None	200	45–101–1
–	September 27	Bees	Postponed (rain); Makeup: September 3 as a traditional double-header					
148	September 28 (1)	Giants	3–4	Harry Gumbert (17–11)	**Ike Pearson** (2–13)	None	see 2nd game	45–102–1
149	September 28 (2)	Giants	3–8 (8)	Hal Schumacher (13–10)	**Ray Harrell** (3–9)	None	3,000	45–103–1
–	September 29	Giants	Canceled (rain and threatening weather); No makeup scheduled					
150	September 30 (1)^{^{[f]}}	@ Dodgers	5–14	Bill Crouch (4–0)	**Roy Bruner** (0–4)	None	see 2nd game	45–104–1
151	September 30 (2)^{^{[f]}}	@ Dodgers	1–5 (7)	Luke Hamlin (20–13)	**Boom-Boom Beck** (7–14)	None	9,431	45–105–1

October (0–1)

#	Date	Opponent	Score	Win	Loss	Save	Attendance	Record
152	October 1 (1)^{^{[f]}}	@ Dodgers	2–3	Hugh Casey (15–10)	**Kirby Higbe** (12–15)	Carl Doyle (1)	17,152	45–106–1
–	October 1 (2)^{^{[f]}}	@ Dodgers	Canceled (rain); No makeup scheduled					

^{^[a]}The April 21, 1993, game ended after eleven innings due to darkness with the score tied 2–2, and an additional game was scheduled for September 25 which became October 1 in Brooklyn.
^{^[b]}The second game on June 4, 1939, was called due to the Pennsylvania Sunday curfew at the end of the third inning with the score 0–2. Since the game was not yet official, it was replayed from the beginning on August 27.
^{^[c]}The original schedule indicated single games on June 18 and 19 and July 26 at Pittsburgh. The game on June 19 was changed to a double-header on June 18 which was postponed due to rain and became a double-headers on July 26 and September 17.
^{^[d]}The original schedule indicated single games on June 12 and July 21 with St. Louis which became a double-header on July 21.
^{^[e]}The original schedule indicated single games on September 7 and 8 at Brooklyn which became a double-header on September 8.
^{^[f]}The original schedule indicated single games on September 25 with Brooklyn and September 30 and October 1 at Brooklyn. September 25 became a double-header because of the April 21 tie which became a double-headers on September 30 and October 1 in Brooklyn.

=== Roster ===
1939 Philadelphia Phillies
**Roster**
**Pitchers**: 15 Boom-Boom Beck; 33 Roy Bruner; 35 Elmer Burkart; 8 Max Butcher; 12 Ray Harrell; 12 Jim Henry; 14 Kirby Higbe; 28 Bill Hoffman; 7 Al Hollingsworth; 3 Syl Johnson; 11 Bill Kerksieck; 9 Hugh Mulcahy; 13 Claude Passeau; 5 Ike Pearson; 11 Jennings Poindexter; 34 Gene Schott; 14 Al Smith	**Catchers**: 34,5 Bill Atwood; 10 Dave Coble; 4 Spud Davis; 7 Joe Kracher; 8,23 Wally Millies; 26 Bennie Warren; **Infielders**: 22 Jack Bolling; -- Eddie Feinberg; 34 Len Gabrielson; 28,16 Roy Hughes; 10 Charlie Letchas; 19 Pinky May; 21 Heinie Mueller; 16 Les Powers; 18 George Scharein; 20 Jim Shilling; 6 Gus Suhr; 5 Johnny Watwood; 20 Pinky Whitney; 17 Del Young	**Outfielders**: 24 Morrie Arnovich; 23 Bud Bates; 16 Stan Benjamin; 27 Gibby Brack; 7 Bud Hafey; 26 Chuck Klein; 25 Hersh Martin; 35 Joe Marty; 28 LeGrant Scott	**Manager**: 1 Doc Prothro; **Coaches**: 3 Syl Johnson; 2 Hans Lobert

== Player stats ==
=== Batting ===
==== Starters by position ====
Note: Pos = Position; G = Games played; AB = At bats; H = Hits; Avg. = Batting average; HR = Home runs; RBI = Runs batted in

Pos	Player	G	AB	H	Avg.	HR	RBI
C	Spud Davis	87	202	62	.307	0	23
1B	Gus Suhr	60	198	63	.318	3	24
2B	Roy Hughes	65	237	54	.228	1	16
SS	George Scharein	118	399	95	.238	1	33
3B	Pinky May	135	464	133	.287	2	62
OF	Joe Marty	91	299	76	.254	9	44
OF	Hersh Martin	111	393	111	.282	1	22
OF	Morrie Arnovich	134	491	159	.324	5	67

==== Other batters ====
Note: G = Games played; AB = At bats; H = Hits; Avg. = Batting average; HR = Home runs; RBI = Runs batted in

Player	G	AB	H	Avg.	HR	RBI
Heinie Mueller	115	341	95	.279	9	43
Gibby Brack	91	270	78	.289	6	41
LeGrant Scott	76	232	65	.280	1	26
Del Young	77	217	57	.263	3	20
Jack Bolling	69	211	61	.289	3	13
Wally Millies	84	205	48	.234	0	12
Pinky Whitney	34	75	14	.187	1	6
Bud Bates	15	58	15	.259	1	2
Bennie Warren	18	56	13	.232	1	7
Les Powers	19	52	18	.346	0	2
Bud Hafey	18	51	9	.176	0	3
Stan Benjamin	12	50	7	.140	0	2
Chuck Klein	25	47	9	.191	1	9
Charlie Letchas	12	44	10	.227	1	3
Jim Shilling	11	33	10	.303	0	4
Dave Coble	15	25	7	.280	0	0
Eddie Feinberg	6	18	4	.222	0	0
Len Gabrielson	5	18	4	.222	0	1
Bill Atwood	4	6	0	.000	0	1
Johnny Watwood	2	6	1	.167	0	0
Joe Kracher	5	5	1	.200	0	0

=== Pitching ===
==== Starting pitchers ====
Note: G = Games pitched; IP = Innings pitched; W = Wins; L = Losses; ERA = Earned run average; SO = Strikeouts

Player	G	IP	W	L	ERA	SO
Hugh Mulcahy	38	225.2	9	16	4.99	59
Kirby Higbe	34	187.1	10	14	4.85	79
Max Butcher	20	105.2	2	13	5.79	27
Claude Passeau	8	53.1	2	4	4.22	29
Roy Bruner	4	27.0	0	4	6.67	11

==== Other pitchers ====
Note: G = Games pitched; IP = Innings pitched; W = Wins; L = Losses; ERA = Earned run average; SO = Strikeouts

Player	G	IP	W	L	ERA	SO
Boom-Boom Beck	34	182.2	7	14	4.73	77
Ike Pearson	26	125.0	2	13	5.76	29
Syl Johnson	22	111.0	8	8	3.81	37
Ray Harrell	22	94.2	3	7	5.42	35
Al Hollingsworth	15	60.0	1	9	5.85	24
Jim Henry	9	23.0	0	1	5.09	7

==== Relief pitchers ====
Note: G = Games pitched; W = Wins; L = Losses; SV = Saves; ERA = Earned run average; SO = Strikeouts

Player	G	W	L	SV	ERA	SO
Bill Kerksieck	23	0	2	0	7.18	13
Jennings Poindexter	11	0	0	0	4.15	12
Al Smith	5	0	0	0	4.00	2
Elmer Burkart	5	1	0	0	4.32	2
Gene Schott	4	0	1	0	4.91	1
Bill Hoffman	3	0	0	0	13.50	1
Bud Hafey	2	0	0	0	33.75	1
Joe Marty	1	0	0	0	4.50	1

== Farm system ==
Level	Team	League	Manager
B	Pensacola Fliers	Southeastern League	Wally Dashiell
D	Mayodan Millers	Bi-State League	Harry Daughtry, Ramon Couto and Chink Outen
D	Moultrie Packers	Georgia–Florida League	Joe Holden
D	Johnstown Johnnies	Pennsylvania State Association	Dick Goldberg

LEAGUE CHAMPIONS: Pensacola
