= 1939 Boston Bees season =

1939 Boston Bees
- League: National League
- Ballpark: The Bee Hive
- City: Boston, Massachusetts
- Record: 63–88 (.417)
- League place: 7th
- Owners: J.A. Robert Quinn
- Managers: Casey Stengel
- Radio: WAAB (Frankie Frisch, Tom Hussey)

The 1939 Boston Bees season was the 69th season of the franchise.

== Offseason ==
- December 16, 1938: Ray Mueller was traded by the Bees to the Pittsburgh Pirates for Johnny Dickshot, Al Todd and cash.
- December 29, 1938: Al Simmons was purchased by the Bees from the Washington Senators for $3,000.

== Regular season ==
=== Season standings ===
National League
Team	W	L	Pct.	GB	Home	Road
Cincinnati Reds	97	57	.630	—	55‍–‍25	42‍–‍32
St. Louis Cardinals	92	61	.601	4½	51‍–‍27	41‍–‍34
Brooklyn Dodgers	84	69	.549	12½	51‍–‍27	33‍–‍42
Chicago Cubs	84	70	.545	13	44‍–‍34	40‍–‍36
New York Giants	77	74	.510	18½	41‍–‍33	36‍–‍41
Pittsburgh Pirates	68	85	.444	28½	35‍–‍42	33‍–‍43
Boston Bees	63	88	.417	32½	37‍–‍35	26‍–‍53
Philadelphia Phillies	45	106	.298	50½	29‍–‍44	16‍–‍62

=== Record vs. opponents ===
1939 National League record Sources:
Team	BSN	BRO	CHC	CIN	NYG	PHI	PIT	STL
Boston	—	10–12–1	6–16	6–16	10–11	13–8	9–12	9–13
Brooklyn	12–10–1	—	11–11–2	10–12	12–10	17–4–1	13–9	9–13
Chicago	16–6	11–11–2	—	10–12	11–11	12–10	14–8	10–12
Cincinnati	16–6	12–10	12–10	—	11–11	19–3	16–6	11–11–2
New York	11–10	10–12	11–11	11–11	—	14–7	11–11	9–12
Philadelphia	8–13	4–17–1	10–12	3–19	7–14	—	8–14	5–17
Pittsburgh	12–9	9–13	8–14	6–16	11–11	14–8	—	8–14
St. Louis	13–9	13–9	12–10	11–11–2	12–9	17–5	14–8	—

=== Notable transactions ===
- April 10, 1939: Johnny Dickshot was purchased from the Bees by the New York Giants.
- April 24, 1939: Oliver Hill was purchased from the Bees by the Milwaukee Brewers.
- August 19, 1939: Milt Shoffner was selected off waivers from the Bees by the Cincinnati Reds
- August 31, 1939: Al Simmons was purchased from the Bees by the Cincinnati Reds.

=== Roster ===
1939 Boston Bees
Roster
Pitchers: 20 George Barnicle; 34 Joe Callahan; 11 Tom Earley; 18 Dick Errickson; 16 Lou Fette; 12 Fred Frankhouse; 17 Johnny Lanning; 14 Danny MacFayden; 26 Hiker Moran; 21 Bill Posedel; 15 Milt Shoffner; 19 Joe Sullivan; 23 Jim Turner; 27 Al Veigel; 11 Roy Weir	Catchers: 29 Stan Andrews; 7 Al López; 10 Phil Masi; Infielders: 37 Red Barkley; 3 Tony Cuccinello; 5 Elbie Fletcher; 6 Buddy Hassett; 2,25 Otto Huber; 2 Hank Majeski; 1 Eddie Miller; 36 Bill Schuster; 5,25 Sibby Sisti; 8 Rabbit Warstler; 15 Whitey Wietelmann	Outfielders: 41 Chet Clemens; 24 Johnny Cooney; 9 Debs Garms; 25 Ralph Hodgin; 22 Jimmy Outlaw; 38 Chet Ross; 1 Bama Rowell; 20 Al Simmons; 4 Max West; Other batters: 28 Oliver Hill	Manager: 31 Casey Stengel; Coaches: 32 George Kelly; 33 Mike Kelly

== Player stats ==
=== Batting ===
==== Starters by position ====
Note: Pos = Position; G = Games played; AB = At bats; H = Hits; Avg. = Batting average; HR = Home runs; RBI = Runs batted in

Pos	Player	G	AB	H	Avg.	HR	RBI
C	Al López	131	412	104	.252	8	49
1B	Buddy Hassett	147	590	182	.308	2	60
2B	Tony Cuccinello	81	310	95	.306	2	40
SS	Eddie Miller	77	296	79	.267	4	31
3B	Hank Majeski	106	367	100	.272	7	54
OF	Debs Garms	132	513	153	.298	2	37
OF	Johnny Cooney	118	368	101	.274	2	27
OF	Max West	130	449	128	.285	19	62

==== Other batters ====
Note: G = Games played; AB = At bats; H = Hits; Avg. = Batting average; HR = Home runs; RBI = Runs batted in

Player	G	AB	H	Avg.	HR	RBI
Rabbit Warstler	114	342	83	.243	0	24
Al Simmons	93	330	93	.282	7	43
Sibby Sisti	63	215	49	.228	1	11
Jimmy Outlaw	65	133	35	.263	0	5
Phil Masi	46	114	29	.254	1	14
Elbie Fletcher	35	106	26	.245	0	6
Whitey Wietelmann	23	69	14	.203	0	5
Bama Rowell	21	59	11	.186	0	6
Ralph Hodgin	32	48	10	.208	0	4
Chet Ross	11	31	10	.323	0	0
Stan Andrews	13	26	6	.231	0	1
Chet Clemens	9	23	5	.217	0	1
Otto Huber	11	22	6	.273	0	3
Red Barkley	12	11	0	.000	0	0
Bill Schuster	2	3	0	.000	0	0
Oliver Hill	2	2	1	.500	0	0

=== Pitching ===
==== Starting pitchers ====
Note: G = Games pitched; IP = Innings pitched; W = Wins; L = Losses; ERA = Earned run average; SO = Strikeouts

Player	G	IP	W	L	ERA	SO
Bill Posedel	33	220.2	15	13	3.92	73
Danny MacFayden	33	191.2	8	14	3.90	46
Jim Turner	25	157.2	4	11	4.26	50
Lou Fette	27	146.0	10	10	2.96	35
Al Veigel	2	2.2	0	1	6.75	1

==== Other pitchers ====
Note: G = Games pitched; IP = Innings pitched; W = Wins; L = Losses; ERA = Earned run average; SO = Strikeouts

Player	G	IP	W	L	ERA	SO
Milt Shoffner	25	132.1	4	6	3.13	51
Johnny Lanning	37	129.0	5	6	3.42	45
Dick Errickson	28	128.1	6	9	4.00	33
Joe Sullivan	31	113.2	6	9	3.64	46
Tom Earley	14	40.0	1	4	4.72	9
Hiker Moran	6	20.0	1	1	4.50	4
George Barnicle	6	18.1	2	2	4.91	15
Joe Callahan	4	17.1	1	0	3.12	8

==== Relief pitchers ====
Note: G = Games pitched; W = Wins; L = Losses; SV = Saves; ERA = Earned run average; SO = Strikeouts

Player	G	W	L	SV	ERA	SO
Fred Frankhouse	23	0	2	4	2.61	12
Roy Weir	2	0	0	0	0.00	2

== Farm system ==
Level	Team	League	Manager
A	Hartford Bees	Eastern League	Fresco Thompson
B	Evansville Bees	Illinois–Indiana–Iowa League	Bob Coleman
C	Utica Braves	Canadian–American League	Amby McConnell, Albert Zachary and Mike Diffley
C	Allentown Dukes	Interstate League	Pete Weimer, George Hennessey and Tony Parisse
C	Charleston Senators	Middle Atlantic League	Ed Hall
D	Owensboro Oilers	KITTY League	Hughie Wise
D	Bradford Bees	PONY League	Bunny Roser

LEAGUE CHAMPIONS: Allentown
