= 1939 Pittsburgh Pirates season =

1939 Pittsburgh Pirates
- League: National League
- Ballpark: Forbes Field
- City: Pittsburgh, Pennsylvania
- Owners: Bill Benswanger
- Managers: Pie Traynor
- Radio: KDKA; WWSW; Rosey Rowswell

The 1939 Pittsburgh Pirates season was the 58th season of the Pittsburgh Pirates franchise; the 53rd in the National League. The Pirates finished sixth in the league standings with a record of 68–85.

== Offseason ==
- December 16, 1938: Johnny Dickshot, Al Todd and cash were traded by the Pirates to the Boston Bees for Ray Mueller.

== Regular season ==
=== Season standings ===
National League
Team	W	L	Pct.	GB	Home	Road
Cincinnati Reds	97	57	.630	—	55‍–‍25	42‍–‍32
St. Louis Cardinals	92	61	.601	4½	51‍–‍27	41‍–‍34
Brooklyn Dodgers	84	69	.549	12½	51‍–‍27	33‍–‍42
Chicago Cubs	84	70	.545	13	44‍–‍34	40‍–‍36
New York Giants	77	74	.510	18½	41‍–‍33	36‍–‍41
Pittsburgh Pirates	68	85	.444	28½	35‍–‍42	33‍–‍43
Boston Bees	63	88	.417	32½	37‍–‍35	26‍–‍53
Philadelphia Phillies	45	106	.298	50½	29‍–‍44	16‍–‍62

=== Record vs. opponents ===
1939 National League record Sources:
Team	BSN	BRO	CHC	CIN	NYG	PHI	PIT	STL
Boston	—	10–12–1	6–16	6–16	10–11	13–8	9–12	9–13
Brooklyn	12–10–1	—	11–11–2	10–12	12–10	17–4–1	13–9	9–13
Chicago	16–6	11–11–2	—	10–12	11–11	12–10	14–8	10–12
Cincinnati	16–6	12–10	12–10	—	11–11	19–3	16–6	11–11–2
New York	11–10	10–12	11–11	11–11	—	14–7	11–11	9–12
Philadelphia	8–13	4–17–1	10–12	3–19	7–14	—	8–14	5–17
Pittsburgh	12–9	9–13	8–14	6–16	11–11	14–8	—	8–14
St. Louis	13–9	13–9	12–10	11–11–2	12–9	17–5	14–8	—

=== Game log ===
1939 Game Log: 68–85 (Home: 35–42; Away: 33–43)
April: 1–8 (Home: 0–2; Away: 1–6)

#	Date	Opponent	Score	Win	Loss	Save	Attendance	Record
1	April 17	@ Reds	7–5	**Blanton** (1–0)	Walters	**Brown** (1)	30,644	1–0
2	April 18	Cardinals	2–3	Weiland	**Klinger** (0–1)	Shoun	15,783	1–1
3	April 22	@ Reds	2–4	Derringer	**Blanton** (1–1)	—	—	1–2
4	April 23	@ Reds	2–7	Walters	**Klinger** (0–2)	—	23,339	1–3
5	April 24	@ Cubs	2–6	Whitehill	**Tobin** (0–1)	Russell	15,844	1–4
6	April 25	@ Cubs	3–5	Lee	**Sewell** (0–1)	—	9,913	1–5
7	April 26	@ Cubs	1–3	Lillard	**Blanton** (1–2)	—	9,516	1–6
8	April 27	@ Cardinals	5–6 (11)	McGee	**Brown** (0–1)	—	1,994	1–7
9	April 29	Reds	3–5	Walters	**Tobin** (0–2)	—	5,913	1–8

May: 18–10 (Home: 8–6; Away: 10–4)

#	Date	Opponent	Score	Win	Loss	Save	Attendance	Record
10	May 1	Reds	2–1	**Sewell** (1–1)	Moore	—	2,724	2–8
11	May 2	@ Dodgers	3–2	**Klinger** (1–2)	Fitzsimmons	—	9,269	3–8
12	May 4	@ Phillies	6–4	**Bauers** (1–0)	Butcher	—	3,500	4–8
13	May 5	@ Phillies	10–7	**Sewell** (2–1)	Hollingsworth	**Brown** (2)	2,000	5–8
14	May 6	@ Phillies	0–1	Passeau	**Brown** (0–2)	—	7,000	5–9
15	May 7	@ Bees	9–2	**Klinger** (2–2)	Posedel	—	21,336	6–9
16	May 8	@ Bees	3–2	**Tobin** (1–2)	Frankhouse	—	2,303	7–9
17	May 10	@ Giants	5–0	**Sewell** (3–1)	Gumbert	—	6,030	8–9
18	May 11	@ Giants	1–4	Melton	**Bowman** (0–1)	—	4,041	8–10
19	May 13	Cubs	2–6	Lee	**Klinger** (2–3)	—	6,948	8–11
20	May 14	Cubs	5–2	**Tobin** (2–2)	Lillard	—	15,397	9–11
21	May 15	Cubs	2–6	French	**Sewell** (3–2)	—	3,941	9–12
22	May 16	Phillies	8–5	**Bowman** (1–1)	Passeau	—	1,823	10–12
23	May 17	Phillies	3–7	Mulcahy	**Klinger** (2–4)	—	2,075	10–13
24	May 18	Phillies	5–4 (10)	**Tobin** (3–2)	Hollingsworth	—	2,183	11–13
25	May 19	Bees	2–5	Errickson	**Sewell** (3–3)	—	2,672	11–14
26	May 20	Bees	12–6	**Bowman** (2–1)	Earley	**Brown** (3)	4,643	12–14
27	May 21	Giants	4–1	**Klinger** (3–4)	Hubbell	—	20,976	13–14
28	May 22	Giants	2–9	Schumacher	**Tobin** (3–3)	—	2,886	13–15
29	May 23	Giants	13–4	**Sewell** (4–3)	Melton	—	3,823	14–15
30	May 24	Dodgers	6–3	**Bowman** (3–1)	Tamulis	—	2,490	15–15
31	May 25	Dodgers	2–8	Pressnell	**Klinger** (3–5)	—	5,600	15–16
32	May 26	@ Cubs	14–5	**Tobin** (4–3)	Lee	**Brown** (4)	5,982	16–16
33	May 27	@ Cubs	9–1	**Sewell** (5–3)	Higbe	—	8,035	17–16
34	May 28	@ Cubs	2–6	Dean	**Bowman** (3–2)	—	26,511	17–17
35	May 29	@ Cardinals	7–0	**Klinger** (4–5)	Weiland	—	1,736	18–17
36	May 30	@ Cardinals	2–7	Warneke	**Tobin** (4–4)	—	—	18–18
37	May 30	@ Cardinals	14–8	**Swift** (1–0)	Davis	—	14,178	19–18

June: 8–13 (Home: 4–4; Away: 4–9)

#	Date	Opponent	Score	Win	Loss	Save	Attendance	Record
38	June 1	@ Phillies	5–2	**Sewell** (6–3)	Higbe	—	—	20–18
39	June 3	@ Phillies	10–7	**Brown** (1–2)	Hollingsworth	**Swift** (1)	2,000	21–18
40	June 4	@ Dodgers	7–3	**Tobin** (5–4)	Hamlin	—	—	22–18
41	June 4	@ Dodgers	1–14	Casey	**Klinger** (4–6)	—	24,257	22–19
42	June 5	@ Dodgers	2–6	Tamulis	**Sewell** (6–4)	—	6,680	22–20
43	June 6	@ Dodgers	2–5	Fitzsimmons	**Bowman** (3–3)	—	6,907	22–21
44	June 7	@ Bees	2–0	**Swift** (2–0)	MacFayden	—	2,795	23–21
45	June 8	@ Bees	0–2	Fette	**Tobin** (5–5)	—	1,894	23–22
46	June 9	@ Bees	1–4	Posedel	**Klinger** (4–7)	—	2,062	23–23
47	June 10	@ Giants	2–6	Schumacher	**Sewell** (6–5)	—	6,815	23–24
48	June 11	@ Giants	3–7	Gumbert	**Bowman** (3–4)	—	—	23–25
49	June 11	@ Giants	4–5	Melton	**Klinger** (4–8)	Coffman	34,749	23–26
50	June 15	Bees	5–6 (11)	Lanning	**Tobin** (5–6)	—	2,900	23–27
51	June 16	Bees	4–2	**Klinger** (5–8)	Posedel	**Brown** (5)	2,491	24–27
52	June 17	Phillies	2–11	Johnson	**Sewell** (6–6)	—	3,741	24–28
53	June 21	Giants	4–6	Melton	**Tobin** (5–7)	Hubbell	5,194	24–29
54	June 22	Giants	8–7	**Bowman** (4–4)	Coffman	—	3,869	25–29
55	June 23	Dodgers	2–1	**Bauers** (2–0)	Hamlin	—	2,419	26–29
56	June 24	Dodgers	6–2	**Tobin** (6–7)	Pressnell	—	5,582	27–29
57	June 25	Dodgers	5–6	Hamlin	**Klinger** (5–9)	Fitzsimmons	14,543	27–30
58	June 27	@ Reds	0–6	Derringer	**Bauers** (2–1)	—	5,181	27–31

July: 19–11 (Home: 8–6; Away: 11–5)

#	Date	Opponent	Score	Win	Loss	Save	Attendance	Record
59	July 1	@ Cardinals	4–3	**Brown** (2–2)	Davis	—	2,336	28–31
60	July 2	@ Cardinals	8–5	**Klinger** (6–9)	Weiland	**Bauers** (1)	—	29–31
61	July 2	@ Cardinals	6–3	**Tobin** (7–7)	Warneke	—	10,449	30–31
62	July 4	Reds	4–7	Grissom	**Swift** (2–1)	—	—	30–32
63	July 4	Reds	4–3	**Brown** (3–2)	Vander Meer	—	41,937	31–32
64	July 5	Cubs	10–1	**Bowman** (5–4)	Root	—	2,201	32–32
65	July 6	Cubs	7–2	**Klinger** (7–9)	Dean	—	6,257	33–32
66	July 7	Cubs	4–5 (11)	Lee	**Bauers** (2–2)	—	4,438	33–33
67	July 9	Cardinals	3–7	Cooper	**Brown** (3–3)	—	—	33–34
68	July 9	Cardinals	8–6	**Tobin** (8–7)	Weiland	—	29,000	34–34
69	July 12	@ Dodgers	3–0	**Brown** (4–3)	Wyatt	—	29,481	35–34
70	July 14	@ Dodgers	4–14	Hamlin	**Bowman** (5–5)	—	20,735	35–35
71	July 15	@ Dodgers	2–6	Fitzsimmons	**Tobin** (8–8)	—	6,814	35–36
72	July 16	@ Phillies	2–3	Mulcahy	**Brown** (4–4)	—	—	35–37
73	July 16	@ Phillies	7–3	**Klinger** (8–9)	Butcher	**Swift** (2)	12,958	36–37
74	July 17	@ Phillies	7–4	**Bowman** (6–5)	Harrell	—	2,500	37–37
75	July 18	@ Phillies	3–8	Johnson	**Swift** (2–2)	—	6,000	37–38
76	July 19	@ Giants	10–3	**Brown** (5–4)	Lohrman	—	3,331	38–38
77	July 20	@ Giants	8–4	**Klinger** (9–9)	Gumbert	**Bowman** (1)	4,310	39–38
78	July 21	@ Giants	4–3	**Sewell** (7–6)	Melton	**Swift** (3)	5,355	40–38
79	July 22	@ Bees	9–3	**Swift** (3–2)	MacFayden	—	2,583	41–38
80	July 23	@ Bees	3–2	**Brown** (6–4)	Shoffner	**Sewell** (1)	—	42–38
81	July 23	@ Bees	0–1	Fette	**Klinger** (9–10)	—	15,558	42–39
82	July 25	Phillies	5–4 (10)	**Klinger** (10–10)	Pearson	—	2,539	43–39
83	July 26	Phillies	3–1	**Swift** (4–2)	Higbe	**Brown** (6)	—	44–39
84	July 26	Phillies	5–3	**Bowman** (7–5)	Beck	—	10,611	45–39
85	July 27	Phillies	8–9	Harrell	**Sewell** (7–7)	Higbe	2,610	45–40
86	July 28	Bees	1–7	Turner	**Brown** (6–5)	—	3,137	45–41
87	July 29	Bees	6–5	**Bowman** (8–5)	Shoffner	**Brown** (7)	4,962	46–41
88	July 30	Bees	5–7	Posedel	**Swift** (4–3)	Sullivan	27,099	46–42

August: 8–22 (Home: 4–10; Away: 4–12)

#	Date	Opponent	Score	Win	Loss	Save	Attendance	Record
89	August 1	Dodgers	3–5	Fitzsimmons	**Brown** (6–6)	Tamulis	3,392	46–43
90	August 2	Dodgers	6–0	**Bowman** (9–5)	Hamlin	—	3,240	47–43
91	August 3	Dodgers	1–4	Pressnell	**Butcher** (0–1)	—	3,112	47–44
92	August 4	Giants	3–2 (11)	**Sewell** (8–7)	Melton	—	3,477	48–44
93	August 5	Giants	3–4	Hubbell	**Brown** (6–7)	—	8,932	48–45
94	August 6	Giants	5–9	Schumacher	**Bowman** (9–6)	Melton	—	48–46
95	August 6	Giants	6–0 (8)	**Klinger** (11–10)	Salvo	—	37,665	49–46
96	August 9	@ Cardinals	3–5	Sunkel	**Bauers** (2–3)	Shoun	3,334	49–47
97	August 11	@ Cubs	2–3	Lee	**Sewell** (8–8)	—	7,296	49–48
98	August 12	@ Cubs	4–6	Bryant	**Swift** (4–4)	Passeau	9,223	49–49
99	August 13	@ Cubs	4–5	Dean	**Klinger** (11–11)	—	25,180	49–50
100	August 14	@ Reds	8–9	Thompson	**Brown** (6–8)	—	23,044	49–51
101	August 15	@ Reds	5–6	Niggeling	**Bowman** (9–7)	—	7,941	49–52
102	August 16	Cardinals	3–4	Bowman	**Klinger** (11–12)	Shoun	—	49–53
103	August 16	Cardinals	0–3	McGee	**Butcher** (0–2)	—	7,855	49–54
104	August 17	Cardinals	2–4	Davis	**Brown** (6–9)	—	2,737	49–55
105	August 18	Cardinals	0–3	Bowman	**Bauers** (2–4)	—	2,586	49–56
106	August 19	Cubs	0–5	Lee	**Tobin** (8–9)	—	3,126	49–57
107	August 20	Cubs	5–9	Passeau	**Klinger** (11–13)	—	—	49–58
108	August 20	Cubs	5–0 (6)	**Butcher** (1–2)	Whitehill	—	13,076	50–58
109	August 22	@ Bees	8–2	**Bowman** (10–7)	Fette	**Swift** (4)	1,767	51–58
110	August 23	@ Bees	0–1	Posedel	**Brown** (6–10)	—	4,691	51–59
111	August 23	@ Bees	1–3	MacFayden	**Heintzelman** (0–1)	—	4,691	51–60
112	August 24	@ Giants	4–3	**Butcher** (2–2)	Salvo	—	4,341	52–60
113	August 26	@ Giants	2–6	Schumacher	**Klinger** (11–14)	Brown	—	52–61
114	August 26	@ Giants	0–8	Melton	**Bowman** (10–8)	—	10,756	52–62
115	August 27	@ Dodgers	2–3	Fitzsimmons	**Brown** (6–11)	Tamulis	—	52–63
116	August 27	@ Dodgers	9–5	**Blanton** (2–2)	Hollingsworth	—	20,119	53–63
117	August 31	@ Phillies	1–0	**Butcher** (3–2)	Higbe	—	—	54–63
118	August 31	@ Phillies	6–11	Beck	**Klinger** (11–15)	—	8,000	54–64

September: 13–20 (Home: 10–13; Away: 3–7)

#	Date	Opponent	Score	Win	Loss	Save	Attendance	Record
119	September 2	@ Cardinals	11–3	**Brown** (7–11)	Bowman	—	2,636	55–64
120	September 3	@ Cardinals	6–14	Davis	**Bowman** (10–9)	Shoun	—	55–65
121	September 3	@ Cardinals	0–3	Weiland	**Blanton** (2–3)	—	11,066	55–66
122	September 4	@ Cubs	2–1	**Butcher** (4–2)	Dean	—	—	56–66
123	September 4	@ Cubs	6–3	**Klinger** (12–15)	Page	—	32,974	57–66
124	September 6	Reds	5–4 (11)	**Swift** (5–4)	Johnson	—	—	58–66
125	September 6	Reds	3–4 (10)	Derringer	**Bowman** (10–10)	—	7,548	58–67
126	September 7	Reds	8–7 (11)	**Sewell** (9–8)	Johnson	—	2,484	59–67
127	September 8	Reds	2–5	Walters	**Butcher** (4–3)	—	4,479	59–68
128	September 9	Cardinals	2–12	Weiland	**Brown** (7–12)	—	3,817	59–69
129	September 10	Cardinals	3–9	Davis	**Klinger** (12–16)	—	—	59–70
130	September 10	Cardinals	4–11	Bowman	**Bowman** (10–11)	—	12,588	59–71
131	September 11	Cardinals	8–6	**Tobin** (9–9)	Andrews	—	1,134	60–71
132	September 13	Giants	0–2	Gumbert	**Swift** (5–5)	—	—	60–72
133	September 13	Giants	7–4	**Klinger** (13–16)	Melton	**Sewell** (2)	3,426	61–72
134	September 14	Dodgers	4–3	**Brown** (8–12)	Tamulis	—	—	62–72
135	September 14	Dodgers	4–8	Crouch	**Swigart** (0–1)	—	3,637	62–73
136	September 15	Dodgers	2–4 (10)	Hutchinson	**Butcher** (4–4)	—	1,548	62–74
137	September 16	Dodgers	2–3	Fitzsimmons	**Bowman** (10–12)	Tamulis	2,457	62–75
138	September 17	Phillies	3–7	Johnson	**Gee** (0–1)	—	—	62–76
139	September 17	Phillies	10–1	**Klinger** (14–16)	Pearson	—	8,008	63–76
140	September 18	Phillies	7–4	**Brown** (9–12)	Bruner	—	688	64–76
141	September 19	Bees	5–3	**Sewell** (10–8)	Turner	—	702	65–76
142	September 21	Bees	6–4	**Gee** (1–1)	Veigel	—	1,980	66–76
143	September 21	Bees	7–0	**Swigart** (1–1)	Posedel	—	1,980	67–76
144	September 22	@ Reds	0–6	Thompson	**Brown** (9–13)	—	—	67–77
145	September 22	@ Reds	9–10	Shoffner	**Klinger** (14–17)	—	5,841	67–78
146	September 23	@ Reds	5–6	Walters	**Swift** (5–6)	—	—	67–79
147	September 23	@ Reds	1–6	Grissom	**Bowman** (10–13)	—	20,951	67–80
148	September 24	@ Reds	2–11	Derringer	**Gee** (1–2)	—	19,929	67–81
149	September 27	Cubs	8–9 (10)	French	**Sewell** (10–9)	—	—	67–82
150	September 27	Cubs	5–9 (10)	Russell	**Swift** (5–7)	Whitehill	1,483	67–83
151	September 29	Reds	1–2	Grissom	**Bowman** (10–14)	—	1,477	67–84

October: 1–1 (Home: 1–1; Away: 0–0)

#	Date	Opponent	Score	Win	Loss	Save	Attendance	Record
152	October 1	Reds	1–9	Thompson	**Clemensen** (0–1)	—	—	67–85
153	October 1	Reds	8–0	**Heintzelman** (1–1)	Moore	—	3,859	68–85

Legend: = Win = Loss
Bold = Pirates team member

=== Roster ===
1939 Pittsburgh Pirates
**Roster**
**Pitchers**: 51 Russ Bauers; 46 Cy Blanton; 48 Joe Bowman; 47 Mace Brown; 40 Max Butcher; 40 Bill Clemensen; 24 Johnny Gee; 53 Ken Heintzelman; 41 Bob Klinger; -- Pep Rambert; 44 Rip Sewell; 45 Bill Swift; -- Oad Swigart; 50 Jim Tobin	**Catchers**: 32 Ray Berres; 30 Ray Mueller; -- Joe Schultz; 31 George Susce; **Infielders**: 25 Bill Brubaker; 16 Elbie Fletcher; -- Frankie Gustine; 20 Lee Handley; 22 Red Juelich; 24 Gus Suhr; 21 Arky Vaughan; 26 Pep Young	**Outfielders**: 17 Fern Bell; -- Bob Elliott; 16 Woody Jensen; 14 Chuck Klein; 14 Heinie Manush; 12 Johnny Rizzo; -- Maurice Van Robays; 10 Lloyd Waner; 11 Paul Waner; **Other batters**: -- Eddie Yount	**Manager**: 35 Pie Traynor; **Coaches**: 36 Jewel Ens; 34 Johnny Gooch; 33 Honus Wagner

== Player stats ==
=== Batting ===
==== Starters by position ====
Note: Pos = Position; G = Games played; AB = At bats; H = Hits; Avg. = Batting average; HR = Home runs; RBI = Runs batted in

Pos	Player	G	AB	H	Avg.	HR	RBI
C	Ray Berres	81	231	53	.229	0	16
1B	Elbie Fletcher	102	370	112	.303	12	71
2B	Pep Young	84	293	81	.276	3	29
SS	Arky Vaughn	152	595	182	.306	6	62
3B	Lee Handley	101	376	107	.285	1	42
OF	Johnny Rizzo	94	330	86	.261	6	55
OF	Lloyd Waner	112	379	108	.285	0	24
OF	Paul Waner	125	461	151	.328	3	45

==== Other batters ====
Note: G = Games played; AB = At bats; H = Hits; Avg. = Batting average; HR = Home runs; RBI = Runs batted in

Player	G	AB	H	Avg.	HR	RBI
Bill Brubaker	100	345	80	.232	7	43
Chuck Klein	85	270	81	.300	11	47
Fern Bell	83	262	75	.286	2	34
Gus Suhr	63	204	59	.289	1	31
Ray Mueller	86	180	42	.233	2	18
Bob Elliott	32	129	43	.333	3	19
Maurice Van Robays	27	105	33	.314	2	16
George Susce	31	75	17	.227	1	4
Frankie Gustine	22	70	13	.186	0	3
Red Juelich	17	46	11	.239	0	4
Joe Schultz Jr.	4	14	4	.286	0	2
Heinie Manush	10	12	0	.000	0	1
Woody Jensen	12	12	2	.167	0	1
Eddie Yount	2	2	0	.000	0	0

=== Pitching ===
==== Starting pitchers ====
Note: G = Games pitched; IP = Innings pitched; W = Wins; L = Losses; ERA = Earned run average; SO = Strikeouts

Player	G	IP	W	L	ERA	SO
Bob Klinger	37	225.0	14	17	4.36	64
Joe Bowman	37	184.2	10	14	4.48	58
Jim Tobin	25	145.1	9	9	4.52	43
Max Butcher	14	86.2	4	4	3.43	21
Oad Swigart	3	24.1	1	1	4.44	8
Johnny Gee	3	19.2	1	2	4.12	16

==== Other pitchers ====
Note: G = Games pitched; IP = Innings pitched; W = Wins; L = Losses; ERA = Earned run average; SO = Strikeouts

Player	G	IP	W	L	ERA	SO
Mace Brown	47	200.1	9	13	3.37	71
Rip Sewell	52	176.1	10	9	4.08	69
Bill Swift	36	129.2	5	7	3.89	56
Russ Bauers	15	53.2	2	4	3.35	12
Cy Blanton	10	42.0	2	3	4.29	11

==== Relief pitchers ====
Note: G = Games pitched; W = Wins; L = Losses; SV = Saves; ERA = Earned run average; SO = Strikeouts

Player	G	W	L	SV	ERA	SO
Ken Heintzelman	17	1	1	0	5.05	18
Bill Clemensen	12	0	1	0	7.33	13
Pep Rambert	2	0	0	0	8.82	4

== Farm system ==
Level	Team	League	Manager
A1	Knoxville Smokies	Southern Association	Neil Caldwell
B	Gadsden Pilots	Southeastern League	Yam Yaryan
C	Hutchinson Pirates	Western Association	Jimmy Jordan
D	Carthage Pirates	Arkansas–Missouri League	Buzz Arlitt
D	Valdosta Trojans	Georgia–Florida League	Bill Morrell
D	McKeesport Little Pirates	Pennsylvania State Association	Leo Mackey and Joe Agee
D	Jamestown Jaguars	PONY League	Mickey LaLange

LEAGUE CHAMPIONS: Carthage
