= 1939 New York Giants (MLB) season =

1939 New York Giants
- League: National League
- Ballpark: Polo Grounds
- City: New York City
- Record: 77–74 (.510)
- League place: 5th
- Owners: Horace Stoneham
- General managers: Bill Terry
- Managers: Bill Terry
- Radio: WABC (Arch McDonald, Garnett Marks, Mel Allen)

The 1939 New York Giants season was the franchise's 57th season. The team finished in fifth place in the National League with a 77–74 record, 18½ games behind the Cincinnati Reds.

== Offseason ==
- December 7, 1938: Les Powers was purchased from the Giants by the Philadelphia Phillies.

== Regular season ==
=== Season standings ===
National League
Team	W	L	Pct.	GB	Home	Road
Cincinnati Reds	97	57	.630	—	55‍–‍25	42‍–‍32
St. Louis Cardinals	92	61	.601	4½	51‍–‍27	41‍–‍34
Brooklyn Dodgers	84	69	.549	12½	51‍–‍27	33‍–‍42
Chicago Cubs	84	70	.545	13	44‍–‍34	40‍–‍36
New York Giants	77	74	.510	18½	41‍–‍33	36‍–‍41
Pittsburgh Pirates	68	85	.444	28½	35‍–‍42	33‍–‍43
Boston Bees	63	88	.417	32½	37‍–‍35	26‍–‍53
Philadelphia Phillies	45	106	.298	50½	29‍–‍44	16‍–‍62

=== Record vs. opponents ===
1939 National League record Sources:
Team	BSN	BRO	CHC	CIN	NYG	PHI	PIT	STL
Boston	—	10–12–1	6–16	6–16	10–11	13–8	9–12	9–13
Brooklyn	12–10–1	—	11–11–2	10–12	12–10	17–4–1	13–9	9–13
Chicago	16–6	11–11–2	—	10–12	11–11	12–10	14–8	10–12
Cincinnati	16–6	12–10	12–10	—	11–11	19–3	16–6	11–11–2
New York	11–10	10–12	11–11	11–11	—	14–7	11–11	9–12
Philadelphia	8–13	4–17–1	10–12	3–19	7–14	—	8–14	5–17
Pittsburgh	12–9	9–13	8–14	6–16	11–11	14–8	—	8–14
St. Louis	13–9	13–9	12–10	11–11–2	12–9	17–5	14–8	—

=== Notable transactions ===
- April 10, 1939: Johnny Dickshot was purchased by the Giants from the Boston Bees.
- August 23, 1939: Jimmy Ripple was traded by the Giants to the Brooklyn Dodgers for Ray Hayworth.

=== Roster ===
1939 New York Giants roster
Roster
Pitchers: 20 Jumbo Brown; 15 Slick Castleman; 14 Dick Coffman; 15 Tom Gorman; 10 Harry Gumbert; 11 Carl Hubbell; 12 Bill Lohrman; 26 Red Lynn; 16 Cliff Melton; 18 Manny Salvo; 17 Hal Schumacher; 27 Hy Vandenberg; 19 Johnnie Wittig	Catchers: 8 Harry Danning; 14 Ray Hayworth; 9 Ken O'Dea; Infielders: 5 Zeke Bonura; 21 Lou Chiozza; 2 Al Glossop; 19 Tom Hafey; 7 Billy Jurges; 22 Alex Kampouris; 19 Tony Lazzeri; 23 Johnny McCarthy; 19 George Myatt; 1 Skeeter Scalzi; 2 Burgess Whitehead; 21 Babe Young	Outfielders: 6 Frank Demaree; 28 Johnny Dickshot; 3 Jo-Jo Moore; 4 Mel Ott; 24 Jimmy Ripple; 25 Bob Seeds	Manager: 30 Bill Terry; Coaches: 31 Travis Jackson; 32 Frank Snyder

== Player stats ==
=== Batting ===
==== Starters by position ====
Note: Pos = Position; G = Games played; AB = At bats; H = Hits; Avg. = Batting average; HR = Home runs; RBI = Runs batted in

Pos	Player	G	AB	H	Avg.	HR	RBI
C	Harry Danning	135	520	163	.313	16	74
1B	Zeke Bonura	123	455	146	.321	11	85
2B	Burgess Whitehead	95	335	80	.239	2	24
SS	Billy Jurges	138	543	155	.285	6	63
3B	Tom Hafey	70	256	62	.242	6	26
OF	Mel Ott	125	396	122	.308	27	80
OF	Frank Demaree	150	560	170	.304	11	79
OF	Jo-Jo Moore	138	562	151	.269	10	47

==== Other batters ====
Note: G = Games played; AB = At bats; H = Hits; Avg. = Batting average; HR = Home runs; RBI = Runs batted in

Player	G	AB	H	Avg.	HR	RBI
Alex Kampouris	74	201	50	.249	5	29
Bob Seeds	63	173	46	.266	5	26
Lou Chiozza	40	142	38	.268	3	12
Jimmy Ripple	66	123	28	.228	1	12
Ken O'Dea	52	97	17	.175	3	11
Johnny McCarthy	50	80	21	.263	1	11
Babe Young	22	75	23	.307	3	14
George Myatt	22	53	10	.189	0	3
Tony Lazzeri	13	44	13	.295	1	8
Johnny Dickshot	10	34	8	.235	0	5
Al Glossop	10	32	6	.188	1	3
Skeeter Scalzi	11	18	6	.333	0	0
Ray Hayworth	5	13	3	.231	0	0

=== Pitching ===
==== Starting pitchers ====
Note: G = Games pitched; IP = Innings pitched; W = Wins; L = Losses; ERA = Earned run average; SO = Strikeouts

Player	G	IP	W	L	ERA	SO
Harry Gumbert	36	243.2	18	11	4.32	81
Hal Schumacher	29	181.2	13	10	4.81	58

==== Other pitchers ====
Note: G = Games pitched; IP = Innings pitched; W = Wins; L = Losses; ERA = Earned run average; SO = Strikeouts

Player	G	IP	W	L	ERA	SO
Cliff Melton	41	207.1	12	15	3.56	95
Bill Lohrman	38	185.2	12	13	4.07	70
Carl Hubbell	29	154.0	11	9	2.75	62
Manny Salvo	32	136.0	4	10	4.63	69
Slick Castleman	12	33.2	1	2	4.54	6
Johnnie Wittig	5	16.2	0	2	7.56	4
Hy Vandenberg	2	6.1	0	0	5.68	3

==== Relief pitchers ====
Note: G = Games pitched; W = Wins; L = Losses; SV = Saves; ERA = Earned run average; SO = Strikeouts

Player	G	W	L	SV	ERA	SO
Jumbo Brown	31	4	0	6	4.15	24
Dick Coffman	28	1	2	3	3.08	9
Red Lynn	26	1	0	1	3.08	22
Tom Gorman	4	0	0	0	7.20	2
Johnny McCarthy	1	0	0	0	7.20	0

== Farm system ==
Level	Team	League	Manager
AA	Jersey City Giants	International League	Bert Niehoff
B	Clinton Giants	Illinois–Indiana–Iowa League	Blondy Ryan
C	Fort Smith Giants	Western Association	Herschel Bobo
D	Milford Giants	Eastern Shore League	Earl Smith and Val Picinich
D	Salisbury Giants	North Carolina State League	Dick Luckey and John Cortuzzo
