= 1939 Chicago Cubs season =

1939 Chicago Cubs
- League: National League
- Ballpark: Wrigley Field
- City: Chicago
- Record: 84–70 (.545)
- League place: 4th
- Owners: Philip K. Wrigley
- General managers: Charles Weber
- Managers: Gabby Hartnett
- Radio: WGN (Bob Elson); WBBM (John Harrington, Pat Flanagan); WJJD (Charlie Grimm, Lew Fonseca)

The 1939 Chicago Cubs season was the 68th season of the Chicago Cubs franchise, the 64th in the National League and the 24th at Wrigley Field. The Cubs finished fourth in the National League with a record of 84–70.

== Regular season ==
=== Season standings ===
National League
Team	W	L	Pct.	GB	Home	Road
Cincinnati Reds	97	57	.630	—	55‍–‍25	42‍–‍32
St. Louis Cardinals	92	61	.601	4½	51‍–‍27	41‍–‍34
Brooklyn Dodgers	84	69	.549	12½	51‍–‍27	33‍–‍42
Chicago Cubs	84	70	.545	13	44‍–‍34	40‍–‍36
New York Giants	77	74	.510	18½	41‍–‍33	36‍–‍41
Pittsburgh Pirates	68	85	.444	28½	35‍–‍42	33‍–‍43
Boston Bees	63	88	.417	32½	37‍–‍35	26‍–‍53
Philadelphia Phillies	45	106	.298	50½	29‍–‍44	16‍–‍62

=== Record vs. opponents ===
1939 National League record Sources:
Team	BSN	BRO	CHC	CIN	NYG	PHI	PIT	STL
Boston	—	10–12–1	6–16	6–16	10–11	13–8	9–12	9–13
Brooklyn	12–10–1	—	11–11–2	10–12	12–10	17–4–1	13–9	9–13
Chicago	16–6	11–11–2	—	10–12	11–11	12–10	14–8	10–12
Cincinnati	16–6	12–10	12–10	—	11–11	19–3	16–6	11–11–2
New York	11–10	10–12	11–11	11–11	—	14–7	11–11	9–12
Philadelphia	8–13	4–17–1	10–12	3–19	7–14	—	8–14	5–17
Pittsburgh	12–9	9–13	8–14	6–16	11–11	14–8	—	8–14
St. Louis	13–9	13–9	12–10	11–11–2	12–9	17–5	14–8	—

=== Roster ===
1939 Chicago Cubs
Roster
Pitchers: 18 Clay Bryant; 22 Dizzy Dean; 14 Larry French; 16 Ray Harrell; 25 Kirby Higbe; 11 Bill Lee; 27 Gene Lillard; 41 Vance Page; 13 Claude Passeau; 17 Charlie Root; 28 Jack Russell; 31 Earl Whitehill	Catchers: 39 Bob Garbark; 2 Gabby Hartnett; 12 Gus Mancuso; Infielders: 2,5 Dick Bartell; 3 Phil Cavarretta; 6 Stan Hack; 4 Billy Herman; 15 Bobby Mattick; 15 Steve Mesner; 32 Rip Russell	Outfielders: 7 Augie Galan; 24 Jim Gleeson; 9 Hank Leiber; 8 Joe Marty; 8 Bill Nicholson; 43 Carl Reynolds	Manager: 2 Gabby Hartnett; Coaches: 19 Red Corriden; 20 Roy Johnson

== Player stats ==
=== Batting ===
==== Starters by position ====
Note: Pos = Position; G = Games played; AB = At bats; H = Hits; Avg. = Batting average; HR = Home runs; RBI = Runs batted in

Pos	Player	G	AB	H	Avg.	HR	RBI
C	Gabby Hartnett	97	306	85	.278	12	59
1B	Rip Russell	143	542	148	.273	9	79
2B	Billy Herman	156	623	191	.307	7	70
SS	Dick Bartell	105	336	80	.238	3	34
3B	Stan Hack	156	641	191	.298	8	56
OF	Augie Galan	148	549	167	.304	6	71
OF	Jim Gleeson	111	332	74	.223	4	45
OF	Hank Leiber	112	365	113	.310	24	88

==== Other batters ====
Note: G = Games played; AB = At bats; H = Hits; Avg. = Batting average; HR = Home runs; RBI = Runs batted in

Player	G	AB	H	Avg.	HR	RBI
Carl Reynolds	88	281	69	.246	4	44
Gus Mancuso	80	251	58	.231	2	17
Bill Nicholson	58	220	65	.295	5	38
Bobby Mattick	51	178	51	.287	0	23
Joe Marty	23	76	10	.132	2	10
Phil Cavarretta	22	55	15	.273	0	0
Steve Mesner	17	43	12	.279	0	6
Bob Garbark	24	21	3	.143	0	0

=== Pitching ===
==== Starting pitchers ====
Note: G = Games pitched; IP = Innings pitched; W = Wins; L = Losses; ERA = Earned run average; SO = Strikeouts

Player	G	IP	W	L	ERA	SO
Bill Lee	37	282.1	19	15	3.44	105
Claude Passeau	34	221.0	13	9	3.05	108
Dizzy Dean	19	96.1	6	4	3.36	27
Clay Bryant	4	31.1	2	1	5.74	9

==== Other pitchers ====
Note: G = Games pitched; IP = Innings pitched; W = Wins; L = Losses; ERA = Earned run average; SO = Strikeouts

Player	G	IP	W	L	ERA	SO
Larry French	36	194.0	15	8	3.29	98
Charlie Root	35	167.1	8	8	4.03	65
Vance Page	27	139.1	7	7	3.88	43
Earl Whitehill	24	89.1	4	7	5.14	42
Gene Lillard	20	55.0	3	5	6.55	31
Kirby Higbe	9	22.2	2	1	3.18	16
Ray Harrell	4	17.1	0	2	8.31	5

==== Relief pitchers ====
Note: G = Games pitched; W = Wins; L = Losses; SV = Saves; ERA = Earned run average; SO = Strikeouts

Player	G	W	L	SV	ERA	SO
Jack Russell	39	4	3	3	3.67	32
Vern Olsen	4	1	0	0	0.00	3

== Farm system ==
Level	Team	League	Manager
AA	Milwaukee Brewers	American Association	Mickey Heath
AA	Los Angeles Angels	Pacific Coast League	Truck Hannah
B	Bloomington Bloomers	Illinois–Indiana–Iowa League	Merv Connelly
B	Moline Plowboys	Illinois–Indiana–Iowa League	Mike Gazella
C	Hot Springs Bathers	Cotton States League	Spike Hunter
C	St. Joseph Angels	Western Association	Goldie Holt
D	Bisbee Bees	Arizona–Texas League	Carl Dittmar
D	Hopkinsville Hoppers	KITTY League	Harry Griswold
D	Eau Claire Bears	Northern League	Ivy Griffin
D	Sioux Falls Canaries	Western League	Ralph Brandon
