= 1939 Brooklyn Dodgers season =

1939 Brooklyn Dodgers
- League: National League
- Ballpark: Ebbets Field
- City: Brooklyn, New York
- Record: 84–69 (.549)
- League place: 3rd
- Owners: James & Dearie Mulvey, Brooklyn Trust Company
- President: Larry MacPhail
- Managers: Leo Durocher
- Radio: WHN, WOR; Red Barber, Al Helfer

The 1939 Brooklyn Dodgers started the year with a new manager, Leo Durocher, who became both the team's manager and starting shortstop. They also became the first New York NL team to have a regular radio broadcast, with Red Barber handling the announcers job, and the first team to have a television broadcast (during their August 26 home game doubleheaders against the Reds, both of which WNBT covered for the NBC network). The team finished in third place, showing some improvement over the previous seasons.

== Offseason ==
- December 13, 1938: Fred Frankhouse was traded by the Dodgers to the Boston Bees for Joe Stripp.
- December 13, 1938: Lew Krausse and cash were traded by the Dodgers to the St. Louis Cardinals for Jimmy Outlaw.
- December 13, 1938: Jimmy Outlaw and Buddy Hassett were traded by the Dodgers to the Boston Bees for Gene Moore and Ira Hutchinson.
- December 19, 1938: Luke Sewell was purchased by the Dodgers from the Chicago White Sox.
- February 2, 1939: Tom Lanning was purchased by the Dodgers from the Philadelphia Phillies.
- February 6, 1939: Kemp Wicker and Chris Hartje were purchased by the Dodgers from the New York Yankees.
- February 23, 1939: Woody English was purchased from the Dodgers by the Chicago Cubs.
- March 31, 1939: Bill Posedel was traded by the Dodgers to the Boston Bees for Al Todd.

== Regular season ==
=== Season standings ===
National League
Team	W	L	Pct.	GB	Home	Road
Cincinnati Reds	97	57	.630	—	55‍–‍25	42‍–‍32
St. Louis Cardinals	92	61	.601	4½	51‍–‍27	41‍–‍34
Brooklyn Dodgers	84	69	.549	12½	51‍–‍27	33‍–‍42
Chicago Cubs	84	70	.545	13	44‍–‍34	40‍–‍36
New York Giants	77	74	.510	18½	41‍–‍33	36‍–‍41
Pittsburgh Pirates	68	85	.444	28½	35‍–‍42	33‍–‍43
Boston Bees	63	88	.417	32½	37‍–‍35	26‍–‍53
Philadelphia Phillies	45	106	.298	50½	29‍–‍44	16‍–‍62

=== Record vs. opponents ===
1939 National League record Sources:
Team	BSN	BRO	CHC	CIN	NYG	PHI	PIT	STL
Boston	—	10–12–1	6–16	6–16	10–11	13–8	9–12	9–13
Brooklyn	12–10–1	—	11–11–2	10–12	12–10	17–4–1	13–9	9–13
Chicago	16–6	11–11–2	—	10–12	11–11	12–10	14–8	10–12
Cincinnati	16–6	12–10	12–10	—	11–11	19–3	16–6	11–11–2
New York	11–10	10–12	11–11	11–11	—	14–7	11–11	9–12
Philadelphia	8–13	4–17–1	10–12	3–19	7–14	—	8–14	5–17
Pittsburgh	12–9	9–13	8–14	6–16	11–11	14–8	—	8–14
St. Louis	13–9	13–9	12–10	11–11–2	12–9	17–5	14–8	—

=== Notable transactions ===
- May 3, 1939: Lyn Lary was purchased by the Dodgers from the Cleveland Indians.
- June 15, 1939: Mel Almada was purchased by the Dodgers from the St. Louis Browns.
- July 18, 1939: Pee Wee Reese was purchased by the Dodgers from the Boston Red Sox.
- August 12, 1939: Herman Besse was purchased from the Dodgers by the Philadelphia Athletics.
- August 12, 1939: Al Hollingsworth was purchased by the Dodgers from the New York Yankees.
- August 17, 1939: Rae Blaemire was purchased from the Dodgers by the New York Giants.
- August 23, 1939: Ray Hayworth was traded by the Dodgers to the New York Giants for Jimmy Ripple

=== Roster ===
1939 Brooklyn Dodgers
Roster
Pitchers: 25 Hugh Casey; 24,26 Bill Crouch; 10 Carl Doyle; 22 Red Evans; 14 Freddie Fitzsimmons; 12 Luke Hamlin; 24 Al Hollingsworth; 19 Ira Hutchinson; 42 George Jeffcoat; 16 Van Mungo; 18 Tot Pressnell; 15 Vito Tamulis; 17 Whit Wyatt	Catchers: 23 Chris Hartje; 10 Ray Hayworth; 9 Babe Phelps; 21 Al Todd; Infielders: 4 Dolph Camilli; 3 Pete Coscarart; 2 Leo Durocher; 6 Johnny Hudson; 26 Lyn Lary; 5 Cookie Lavagetto; 11 Tony Lazzeri	Outfielders: 29 Mel Almada; 22 Lindsay Deal; 17 Oris Hockett; 20 Ernie Koy; 1 Gene Moore; 8,32 Art Parks; 17 Jimmy Ripple; 27 Goody Rosen; 34 Gene Schott; 28 Fred Sington; 30 Tuck Stainback; 11 Dixie Walker	Manager: 2 Leo Durocher; Coaches: 7 Charlie Dressen; 31 Bill Killefer

== Player stats ==
=== Batting ===
==== Starters by position ====
Note: Pos = Position; G = Games played; AB = At bats; H = Hits; Avg. = Batting average; HR = Home runs; RBI = Runs batted in

Pos	Player	G	AB	H	Avg.	HR	RBI
C	Babe Phelps	98	323	92	.285	6	42
1B	Dolph Camilli	157	565	164	.290	26	104
2B	Pete Coscarart	115	419	116	.277	4	43
3B	Cookie Lavagetto	153	587	176	.300	10	87
SS	Leo Durocher	116	390	108	.277	1	34
OF	Gene Moore	107	306	69	.225	3	39
OF	Art Parks	71	239	65	.272	1	19
OF	Ernie Koy	125	425	118	.278	8	67

==== Other batters ====
Note: G = Games played; AB = At bats; H = Hits; Avg. = Batting average; HR = Home runs; RBI = Runs batted in

Player	G	AB	H	Avg.	HR	RBI
Johnny Hudson	109	343	87	.254	2	32
Al Todd	86	245	68	.278	5	32
Dixie Walker	61	225	63	.280	2	38
Tuck Stainback	68	201	54	.269	3	19
Goody Rosen	54	183	46	.251	1	12
Mel Almada	39	112	24	.214	0	3
Jimmy Ripple	28	106	35	.330	0	22
Fred Sington	32	84	23	.274	1	7
Tony Lazzeri	14	39	11	.282	3	6
Lyn Lary	29	31	5	.161	0	1
Ray Hayworth	21	26	4	.154	0	1
Chris Hartje	9	16	5	.313	0	5
Oris Hockett	9	13	3	.231	0	1
Lindsay Deal	4	7	0	.000	0	0
Gene Schott	1	0	0	----	0	0

=== Pitching ===
==== Starting pitchers ====
Note: G = Games pitched; IP = Innings pitched; W = Wins; L = Losses; ERA = Earned run average; SO = Strikeouts

Player	G	IP	W	L	ERA	SO
Luke Hamlin	40	269.2	20	13	3.64	88
Freddie Fitzsimmons	27	151.1	7	9	3.87	44
Whit Wyatt	16	109.0	8	3	2.31	52
Van Mungo	14	77.1	4	5	3.26	34

==== Other pitchers ====
Note: G = Games pitched; IP = Innings pitched; W = Wins; L = Losses; ERA = Earned run average; SO = Strikeouts

Player	G	IP	W	L	ERA	SO
Hugh Casey	40	227.1	15	10	2.93	79
Vito Tamulis	39	158.2	9	8	4.37	83
Tot Pressnell	31	156.2	9	7	4.02	43
Red Evans	24	64.1	1	8	5.18	28
Bill Crouch	6	38.1	4	0	2.58	10
Al Hollingsworth	8	27.1	1	2	5.27	11
Carl Doyle	5	17.2	1	2	1.02	7
Boots Poffenberger	3	5.0	0	0	5.40	2

==== Relief pitchers ====
Note: G = Games pitched; W = Wins; L = Losses; SV = Saves; ERA = Earned run average; SO = Strikeouts

Player	G	W	L	SV	ERA	SO
Ira Hutchinson	41	5	2	1	4.34	46
George Jeffcoat	1	0	0	0	0.00	1

== Awards and honors ==
- 1939 Major League Baseball All-Star Game
  - Dolph Camilli reserve
  - Cookie Lavagetto reserve
  - Babe Phelps reserve
  - Whit Wyatt reserve
- TSN Manager of the Year Award
  - Leo Durocher
- TSN Major League Executive of the Year Award
  - Larry MacPhail

=== League top five finishers ===
Dolph Camilli

- #3 in NL in home runs (26)
- #4 in NL in runs batted in (104)
- #4 in NL in runs scored (105)
- #4 in NL in on-base percentage (.409)
- #4 in NL in slugging percentage (.524)

Hugh Casey

- #4 in NL in earned run average (2.93)

Luke Hamlin

- #4 in NL in wins (20)

Cookie Lavagetto

- #4 in NL in stolen bases (14)

== Farm system ==
Level	Team	League	Manager
AA	Montreal Royals	International League	Burleigh Grimes
A1	Memphis Chicks	Southern Association	Frank Brazil
A1	Nashville Vols	Southern Association	Larry Gilbert
A	Elmira Pioneers	Eastern League	Clyde Sukeforth
B	Macon Peaches	South Atlantic League	Milt Stock
C	Gloversville-Johnstown Glovers	Canadian–American League	Elmer Yoter
C	Greenwood Crackers	Cotton States League	Cecil Rhodes
C	Pine Bluff Judges	Cotton States League	Jimmy Sherlin; Andy Cohen
C	Dayton Wings	Middle Atlantic League	Dudley Lee; Andy Cohen
D	Reidsville Luckies	Bi-State League	William Clark
D	Daytona Beach Islanders	Florida State League	Tommy West
D	Americus Pioneers	Georgia–Florida League	Joe Sims
D	Paducah Indians	Kentucky–Illinois–Tennessee League	Ben Tincup
D	Huntington Boosters	Mountain State League	Ellis Powers
D	Superior Blues	Northern League	George Treadwell
D	Olean Oilers	Pennsylvania–Ontario–New York League	Jake Pitler

LEAGUE CHAMPIONS: Greenwood, Pine Bluff
