= 1939 St. Louis Cardinals season =

Major League Baseball season

1939 St. Louis Cardinals
- League: National League
- Ballpark: Sportsman's Park
- City: St. Louis, Missouri
- Record: 92–61 (.601)
- League place: 2nd
- Owners: Sam Breadon
- General managers: Branch Rickey
- Managers: Ray Blades
- Radio: KMOX (France Laux, Cy Casper); KWK (Johnny O'Hara, Jim Bottomley)
- Stats: ESPN.com; Baseball Reference

The 1939 St. Louis Cardinals season was the team's 58th season in St. Louis, Missouri and the 48th season in the National League. The Cardinals went 92–61 during the season and finished second in the National League.

== Regular season ==
=== Season summary ===
Shortly after the end of the 1938 season, owner Sam Breadon appointed former reserve Cardinals outfielder Ray Blades as manager. He had managed many of the organization's top young players in Columbus, Ohio, and Rochester, New York.

A feisty skipper, Blades guided the Cardinals back into the pennant race. The Cincinnati Reds took over first place on May 26 and never fell back. The Cards seized second place at midseason and played at a .708 clip in the final 65 games-including a 29–6 record at home the second half, but never could catch the Reds.

The Redbirds made Cincinnati work down the stretch, though. They took two games from the Reds with the third of the three-game series washed out as a tie, and that pulled the Cards to only 3 and a half games back. Twice the Cardinals drew a game closer in September.

An old trade haunted the Cards: Paul Derringer, a former St. Louis farmhand, went 25–7 for the Reds. That record included a 5–3 victory in September that clinched the pennant for the Reds.

The best offense in the league was at least partially responsible for the Cardinals' dramatic turn. They led the NL in runs and made the most of their speed to head the league in doubles and triples. Their .294 team batting average was 16 points higher than anyone else's.

The trade that sent Dizzy Dean to the Chicago Cubs actually paid some dividends. Curt Davis, one of the two pitchers picked up in the deal, led the Redbirds' staff in almost every category. Clyde Shoun, the other ex-Cub, worked a team-high 51 games out of the bullpen. With rookie Mort Cooper winning 12 games and working more than 200 innings, the Cards pitchers posted the league's second-best ERA.

=== Season standings ===
National League
| Team | W | L | Pct. | GB | Home | Road |
|---|---|---|---|---|---|---|
| Cincinnati Reds | 97 | 57 | .630 | — | 55‍–‍25 | 42‍–‍32 |
| St. Louis Cardinals | 92 | 61 | .601 | 4½ | 51‍–‍27 | 41‍–‍34 |
| Brooklyn Dodgers | 84 | 69 | .549 | 12½ | 51‍–‍27 | 33‍–‍42 |
| Chicago Cubs | 84 | 70 | .545 | 13 | 44‍–‍34 | 40‍–‍36 |
| New York Giants | 77 | 74 | .510 | 18½ | 41‍–‍33 | 36‍–‍41 |
| Pittsburgh Pirates | 68 | 85 | .444 | 28½ | 35‍–‍42 | 33‍–‍43 |
| Boston Bees | 63 | 88 | .417 | 32½ | 37‍–‍35 | 26‍–‍53 |
| Philadelphia Phillies | 45 | 106 | .298 | 50½ | 29‍–‍44 | 16‍–‍62 |

=== Record vs. opponents ===
1939 National League record Sources:
| Team | BSN | BRO | CHC | CIN | NYG | PHI | PIT | STL |
|---|---|---|---|---|---|---|---|---|
| Boston | — | 10–12–1 | 6–16 | 6–16 | 10–11 | 13–8 | 9–12 | 9–13 |
| Brooklyn | 12–10–1 | — | 11–11–2 | 10–12 | 12–10 | 17–4–1 | 13–9 | 9–13 |
| Chicago | 16–6 | 11–11–2 | — | 10–12 | 11–11 | 12–10 | 14–8 | 10–12 |
| Cincinnati | 16–6 | 12–10 | 12–10 | — | 11–11 | 19–3 | 16–6 | 11–11–2 |
| New York | 11–10 | 10–12 | 11–11 | 11–11 | — | 14–7 | 11–11 | 9–12 |
| Philadelphia | 8–13 | 4–17–1 | 10–12 | 3–19 | 7–14 | — | 8–14 | 5–17 |
| Pittsburgh | 12–9 | 9–13 | 8–14 | 6–16 | 11–11 | 14–8 | — | 8–14 |
| St. Louis | 13–9 | 13–9 | 12–10 | 11–11–2 | 12–9 | 17–5 | 14–8 | — |

=== Roster ===
1939 St. Louis Cardinals
Roster
| Pitchers: 22 Nate Andrews; 18 Frank Barrett; 26 Bob Bowman; 25 Mort Cooper; 27 Curt Davis; 22 Paul Dean; 32 Murry Dickson; 30 Max Lanier; 29 Bill McGee; 23 Ken Raffensberger; 24 Clyde Shoun; 28 Tom Sunkel; 21 Lon Warneke; 20 Bob Weiland | Catchers: 13 Herb Bremer; 12,13,15 Herman Franks; 14 Mickey Owen; 16 Don Padgett; Infielders: 3 Jimmy Brown; 19 Creepy Crespi; 5 Don Gutteridge; 19 Johnny Hopp; 2 Lyn Lary; 6 Stu Martin; 10 Johnny Mize; 1 Lynn Myers; 4 Joe Orengo; 23 Bob Repass | Outfielders: 17 Lynn King; 1 Pepper Martin; 7 Joe Medwick; 8 Terry Moore; 9 Enos Slaughter; Other batters: 12 Buster Adams; 4 Johnny Echols | Manager: 37 Ray Blades; Coaches: 35 Mike González; 36 Buzzy Wares |

== Player stats ==
| = Indicates team leader |

| = Indicates league leader |

=== Batting ===
==== Starters by position ====
Note: Pos = Position; G = Games played; AB = At bats; H = Hits; Avg. = Batting average; HR = Home runs; RBI = Runs batted in

| Pos | Player | G | AB | H | Avg. | HR | RBI |
|---|---|---|---|---|---|---|---|
| C | Mickey Owen | 131 | 344 | 89 | .259 | 3 | 35 |
| 1B | Johnny Mize | 153 | 564 | 197 | .349 | 28 | 108 |
| 2B | Stu Martin | 120 | 425 | 114 | .268 | 3 | 30 |
| SS | Jimmy Brown | 147 | 645 | 192 | .298 | 3 | 51 |
| 3B | Don Gutteridge | 148 | 524 | 141 | .269 | 7 | 54 |
| OF | Joe Medwick | 150 | 606 | 201 | .332 | 14 | 117 |
| OF | Enos Slaughter | 149 | 604 | 193 | .320 | 12 | 86 |
| OF | Terry Moore | 130 | 417 | 123 | .295 | 17 | 77 |

==== Other batters ====
Note: G = Games played; AB = At bats; H = Hits; Avg. = Batting average; HR = Home runs; RBI = Runs batted in

| Player | G | AB | H | Avg. | HR | RBI |
|---|---|---|---|---|---|---|
| Pepper Martin | 88 | 281 | 86 | .306 | 3 | 37 |
| Don Padgett | 92 | 233 | 93 | .399 | 5 | 53 |
| Lynn Myers | 74 | 117 | 28 | .239 | 0 | 10 |
| Lynn King | 89 | 85 | 20 | .235 | 0 | 11 |
| Lyn Lary | 34 | 75 | 14 | .187 | 0 | 9 |
| Creepy Crespi | 15 | 29 | 5 | .172 | 0 | 6 |
| Herman Franks | 17 | 17 | 1 | .059 | 0 | 3 |
| Herb Bremer | 9 | 9 | 1 | .111 | 0 | 1 |
| Bob Repass | 3 | 6 | 2 | .333 | 0 | 1 |
| Eddie Lake | 2 | 4 | 1 | .250 | 0 | 0 |
| Johnny Hopp | 6 | 4 | 2 | .500 | 0 | 2 |
| Joe Orengo | 7 | 3 | 0 | .000 | 0 | 0 |
| Buster Adams | 2 | 1 | 0 | .000 | 0 | 0 |
| Johnny Echols | 2 | 0 | 0 | ---- | 0 | 0 |

=== Pitching ===
==== Starting pitchers ====
Note: G = Games pitched; IP = Innings pitched; W = Wins; L = Losses; ERA = Earned run average; SO = Strikeouts

| Player | G | IP | W | L | ERA | SO |
|---|---|---|---|---|---|---|
| Curt Davis | 49 | 248.0 | 22 | 16 | 3.63 | 70 |
| Mort Cooper | 45 | 210.2 | 12 | 6 | 3.25 | 130 |
| Lon Warneke | 34 | 162.0 | 13 | 7 | 3.78 | 59 |
| Bob Weiland | 32 | 146.1 | 10 | 12 | 3.57 | 63 |
| Max Lanier | 7 | 37.2 | 2 | 1 | 2.39 | 14 |

==== Other pitchers ====
Note: G = Games pitched; IP = Innings pitched; W = Wins; L = Losses; ERA = Earned run average; SO = Strikeouts

| Player | G | IP | W | L | ERA | SO |
|---|---|---|---|---|---|---|
| Bob Bowman | 51 | 169.1 | 13 | 5 | 2.60 | 78 |
| Bill McGee | 43 | 156.0 | 12 | 5 | 3.81 | 56 |
| Tom Sunkel | 20 | 85.1 | 4 | 4 | 4.22 | 54 |

==== Relief pitchers ====
Note: G = Games pitched; W = Wins; L = Losses; SV = Saves; ERA = Earned run average; SO = Strikeouts

| Player | G | W | L | SV | ERA | SO |
|---|---|---|---|---|---|---|
| Clyde Shoun | 53 | 3 | 1 | 9 | 3.76 | 50 |
| Paul Dean | 16 | 0 | 1 | 0 | 6.07 | 16 |
| Nate Andrews | 11 | 1 | 2 | 0 | 6.75 | 6 |
| Murry Dickson | 1 | 0 | 0 | 0 | 0.00 | 2 |
| Frank Barrett | 1 | 0 | 1 | 0 | 5.40 | 3 |
| Ken Raffensberger | 1 | 0 | 0 | 0 | 0.00 | 1 |
| Terry Moore | 1 | 0 | 0 | 0 | 0.00 | 1 |

== Awards and honors ==
=== Cardinals in the 1939 All-Star Game ===
- Pitcher Curt Davis
- Outfielder Joe Medwick
- First baseman Johnny Mize
- Outfielder Terry Moore
- Pitcher Lon Warneke

== Farm system ==
| Level | Team | League | Manager |
|---|---|---|---|
| AA | Columbus Red Birds | American Association | Burt Shotton |
| AA | Rochester Red Wings | International League | Billy Southworth |
| AA | Sacramento Solons | Pacific Coast League | Benny Borgmann |
| A1 | Houston Buffaloes | Texas League | Eddie Dyer |
| B | Decatur Commodores | Illinois–Indiana–Iowa League | Tony Kaufmann |
| B | Asheville Tourists | Piedmont League | Hal Anderson |
| B | Columbus Red Birds | Sally League | Clay Hopper |
| B | Mobile Shippers | Southeastern League | Marty Purtell |
| C | Kilgore Boomers | East Texas League | Jimmy Dalrymple |
| C | Portsmouth Red Birds | Middle Atlantic League | Joe Davis |
| C | Pocatello Cardinals | Pioneer League | Tony Robello |
| C | Springfield Cardinals | Western Association | George Silvey |
| D | Johnson City Cardinals | Appalachian League | Ollie Vanek |
| D | Albuquerque Cardinals | Arizona–Texas League | Bill DeLancey |
| D | Monett Red Birds | Arkansas–Missouri League | Fred Hawn |
| D | Martinsville Manufacturers | Bi-State League | Jim Poole, Al Krupski and Harry Daughtry |

| Level | Team | League | Manager |
|---|---|---|---|
| D | Cambridge Cardinals | Eastern Shore League | Fred Lucas |
| D | New Iberia Cardinals | Evangeline League | Jimmie Sanders |
| D | Daytona Beach Islanders | Florida State League | Tommy West |
| D | Albany Cardinals | Georgia–Florida League | Johnny Keane |
| D | Union City Greyhounds | KITTY League | Lee Johnson |
| D | Williamson Red Birds | Mountain State League | Harrison Wickel |
| D | Caruthersville Pilots | Northeast Arkansas League | Bunny Simmons |
| D | Duluth Dukes | Northern League | Dutch Dorman |
| D | Fostoria Cardinals | Ohio State League | Jack Farmer |
| D | Washington Red Birds | Pennsylvania State Association | Bob Scheffing |
| D | Hamilton Red Wings | PONY League | Don Hurst |
| D | Gastonia Cardinals | Tar Heel League | Al Unser |
| D | Worthington Cardinals | Western League | Joe McDermott |

LEAGUE CHAMPIONS: Rochester, Sacramento, Asheville, Kilgore, Springfield, Albuquerque, Cambridge, Albany, Washington, Gastonia
