= Tom Hafey (baseball) =

American baseball player

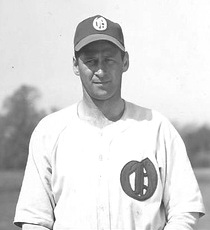
- Hafey, circa 1947
- Third baseman
- Born: July 12, 1913; Berkeley, California
- Died: October 2, 1996 (aged 83); El Cerrito, California
- Batted: Right Threw: Right

MLB debut
- July 21, 1939, for the New York Giants

Last MLB appearance
- July 30, 1944, for the St. Louis Browns

MLB statistics
- Batting average: .248
- Home runs: 6
- Runs batted in: 28
- Stats at Baseball Reference

Teams
- New York Giants (1939); St. Louis Browns (1944)

Thomas Francis Hafey (July 12, 1913 – October 2, 1996) nicknamed "Heave-O", was a Major League Baseball third baseman who played with the New York Giants and the St. Louis Browns in 1939 and 1944. His brother Bud Hafey and cousin Chick Hafey also played in the Major Leagues.
