= Al Veigel =

American baseball player (1917-2012)

- Pitcher
- Born: January 30, 1917; Dover, Ohio, U.S.
- Died: April 8, 2012 (aged 95); Dover, Ohio, U.S.
- Batted: Right Threw: Right

MLB debut
- September 21, 1939, for the Boston Bees

Last MLB appearance
- September 25, 1939, for the Boston Bees

MLB statistics
- Win–loss record: 0–1
- Earned run average: 6.75
- Strikeouts: 1
- Stats at Baseball Reference

Teams
- Boston Bees (1939)

Allen Francis Veigel (January 30, 1917 – April 8, 2012) was an American Major League Baseball starting pitcher, born in Dover, Ohio, who played for the Boston Bees during the 1939 season. Listed at 6 ft 1 in (1.85 m), 180 lb (82 kg), he batted and threw right-handed.

In a one-season career, Veigel posted a 0–1 record with a 6.75 ERA in two appearances, giving up six runs (four unearned) on three hits and five walks while striking out one in 2 2/3 innings of work.

During World War II, Veigel served in the United States Army Air Forces. After the war, he had a career in sales. He continued to be involved in sports as a high school and college basketball referee.

Veigel died in the city of his birth on April 8, 2012, aged 95.

== See also ==
- 1939 Boston Bees season
