= Elmer Burkart =

American baseball player (1917–1995)

- Pitcher
- Born: February 1, 1917; Philadelphia, Pennsylvania, U.S.
- Died: February 6, 1995 (aged 78); Baltimore, Maryland, U.S.
- Batted: Right Threw: Right

MLB debut
- September 14, 1936, for the Philadelphia Phillies

Last MLB appearance
- May 5, 1939, for the Philadelphia Phillies

MLB statistics
- Win–loss record: 1–1
- Earned run average: 4.93
- Strikeouts: 9
- Stats at Baseball Reference

Teams
- Philadelphia Phillies (1936–1939)

Elmer Robert Burkart (February 1, 1917 – February 6, 1995) was an American Major League Baseball (MLB) pitcher. Burkart played for the Philadelphia Phillies from 1936 to 1940. In sixteen career games, he had a 1–1 record with a 4.93 ERA. He batted and threw right-handed.

== Biography ==
Burkart earned his only victory near the end of his MLB career on April 22, 1939. While he pitched the final two innings in relief against the Brooklyn Dodgers, the Phillies scored three runs in the bottom of the ninth inning for a 5–4 walk-off win.

His only loss had come in the previous season when he pitched a complete game in the second game of a double-header at Braves Field as the Boston Bees defeated the Phillies, 4–1.

Burkart was born in Philadelphia, Pennsylvania, and died in Baltimore, Maryland. He was buried at Dulaney Valley Memorial Gardens.
