= Landa Park (Baseball Diamond) =

Former baseball field in New Braunfels, Texas

Coordinates: 29.710386°N 98.133172°W

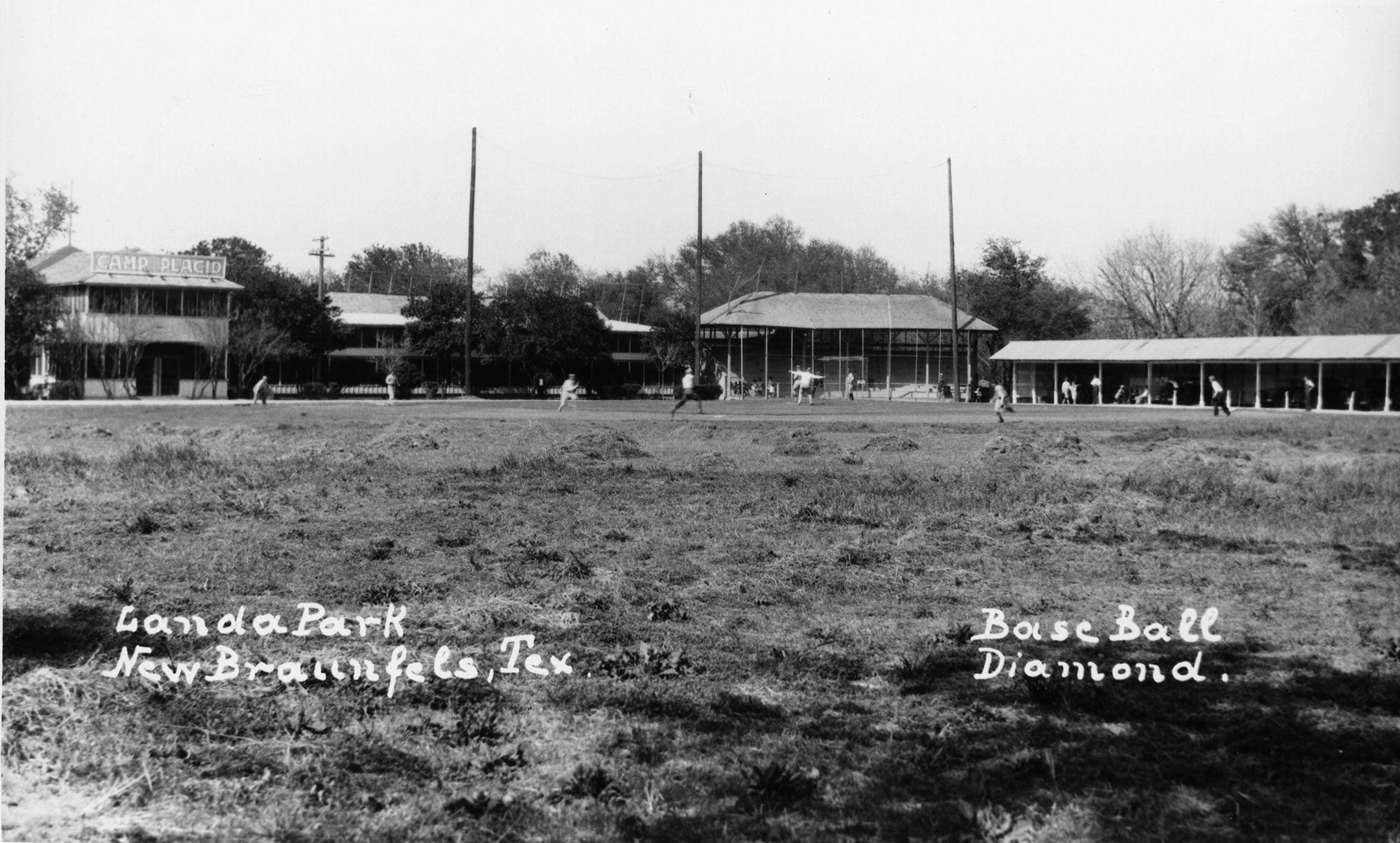
- Landa Park Baseball Diamond
- Interactive map of Landa Park
- Location: Landa Park, New Braunfels, Texas
- Owner: Harry Landa (1890s-1926); Jarrett Investment Company (1927-1936); City of New Braunfels (1936-1952)
- Operator: City of New Braunfels
- Surface: Grass
- Field size: Left Field – ft Center Field – ft Right Field – ft

Construction
- Demolished: 1968

Tenants
- New Braunfels Tigers (semi-Professional) (1909-1952); Minneapolis Millers (AA) (spring training) (1937, 1941-1942); Philadelphia Phillies (NL) (spring training) (1939); Toledo Mud Hens (AA) (spring training) (1940)

Landa Park was the eponymous name of the baseball field in the Landa Park recreation area in New Braunfels, Texas. Opened as Landa's Park to be a destination recreational area to the public in 1898, Landa Park in the present day is a 51-acre city park. A grandstand and baseball diamond were constructed at Landa's Park by 1909 that became home to the semi-professional New Braunfels Tigers, and between 1937 and 1942, hosted professional baseball teams for spring training. The Philadelphia Phillies held spring training at Landa Park in 1939. The grandstand and diamond were razed ahead of the 1968 facilities upgrade and construction of a swimming pool.

== Comal Springs and Landa's Park ==
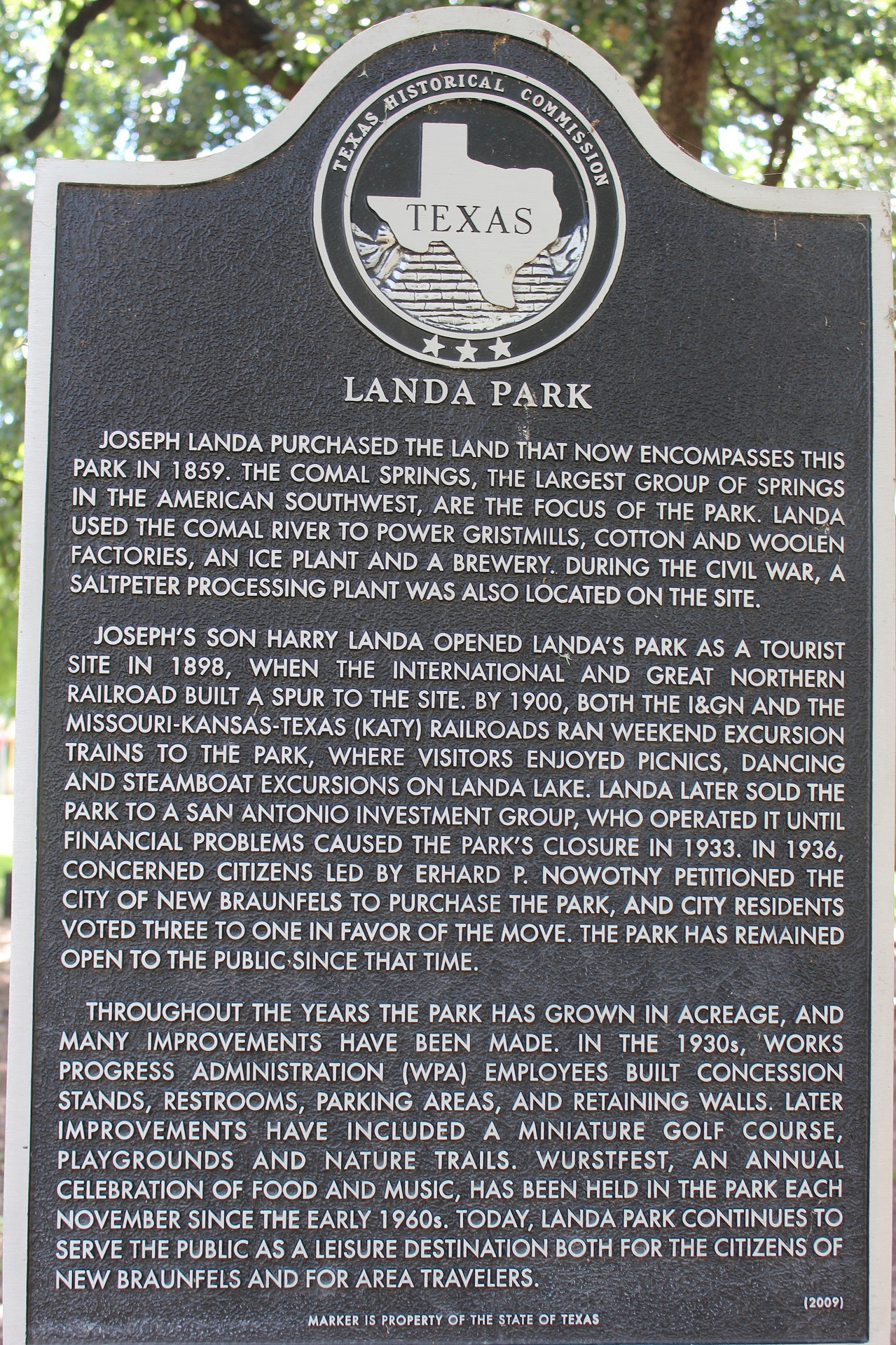
Texas Historical Commission Marker (2016)

The Comal Springs are the largest concentration of naturally occurring freshwater springs in Texas, and located in New Braunfels. The springs had long been visited by indigenous peoples includes the Tonkawa. Spaniard Damián Massanet first visited the area in 1691 and it became home to a Spanish mission. In 1847, William Merriwether purchased 480-acres from Maria de Veramendi Garza which included the Springs and surrounding area. Merriweather sold the land to Joseph Landa in 1860 for $14,000, who passed it to son Harry Landa in 1890.

In 1897, Landa hosted Helen Gould, philanthropist and daughter of railroad magnate Jay Gould who, taken with the area's natural beauty, encouraged Landa to open the area to the general public for recreation. Jay Gould owned the International–Great Northern Railroad (I&GN) which constructed a spur from San Antonio to New Braunfels, and the following year New Braunfels and Landa's Park were marketed as a destination resort. Amenities were built including a Philippine-style gazebo on the lake shore, footbridges, and dining and dance pavilions, and Landa's Park became a popular tourist destination.

Landa's mother's will directed that the estate including Landa's Park be divested. Landa's Park was sold to investors in 1927 who went bankrupt in 1933, and Landa's Park fell into disrepair. The City of New Braunfels passed a bond referendum in 1936, purchased what it now called Landa Park for $80,000, and reopened the park to the public.

== Local Baseball and Spring Training ==
The baseball field and seating were constructed as early as 1909 when the semi-professional New Braunfels Tigers began playing home games at what was called Landa's Park baseball diamond. The Tigers would play until 1952, for many years in the South Texas Semi-Professional League. Games were usually held on Sundays and attracted large crowds.

From its opening to the public in 1898, Landa's Park had become a destination resort for the surrounding area including Austin fifty-miles to the northwest and San Antonio 30-miles to the southeast. The I&GN and Missouri-Kansas-Texas Railroad both had stops in New Braunfels, and families, friend groups, social clubs, and professional associations made weekend and holiday excursions to Landa Park to picnic, swim, play sports, and enjoy the grounds.

On April 21, 1910, University of Texas students held a picnic in Landa Park, and in the afternoon a large crowd saw the Texas baseball team defeat St. Edward's College's 10 to 6 in seven innings.

As early as the 1890s, major league and minor league baseball clubs, still independent and unaffiliated with major league teams, sought warm weather sites for spring training, often at resort destinations. Clubs trained as far west as California, in Arkansas, Oklahoma, Texas, Louisana, the Carolinas, Georgia, Florida, and Cuba. Major League teams held spring training in multiple cities across Texas between 1903 and 1941.

The Western League Des Moines Demons in 1926 were the first professional team to hold spring training in New Braunfels at Landa Park. That spring the St. Louis Cardinals and American Association Minneapolis Millers trained 30 miles to the southeast in San Antonio along with the Texas League San Antonio Bears which offered exhibition game opponents.

Following the 1936 acquisition and renovation of the Park by the City of New Braunfels, the City sought to attract professional baseball teams to the city for spring training.

The Minneapolis Millers held spring training in New Braunfels in 1937. Prior to their arrival, the Landa Park baseball diamond was upgraded to regulation outfield dimensions and improved infield conditions. The American League St. Louis Browns trained in San Antonio and faced the Millers in New Braunfels that spring.

In November 1938, the Philadelphia Phillies agreed to train in New Braunfels in 1939. New Braunfels offered to underwrite many of the team's training expenses, and the St. Louis Browns in San Antonio offered exhibition game competition. The city sent a prospectus to Phillies president Gerry Nugent which advertised, "New Braunfels is the oldest and most picturesque town in Texas ... it has an ideal, temperate climate and for years has been a mecca for tourists. The park at which the Phillies will train is known as Landa Park, the prettiest park in Texas. In addition to the baseball field it embraced two swimming pools and all other accoutrements that go to make up an ideal amusement spot." Phillies leadership inspected the town and field on December 1, 1938, and found both the field and clubhouse undergoing upgrades. The Phillies arrived in New Braunfels on February 27, 1939, to the streets draped in bunting with signs reading, "New Braunfels, training site of the Philadelphia Phillies". The team stayed at the Faust Hotel.

The Toledo Mud Hens trained at Landa Park in 1940. The Millers would return and hold spring training in New Braunfels at Landa Park in 1941 and 1942.

== Renovation and Landa Park Today ==
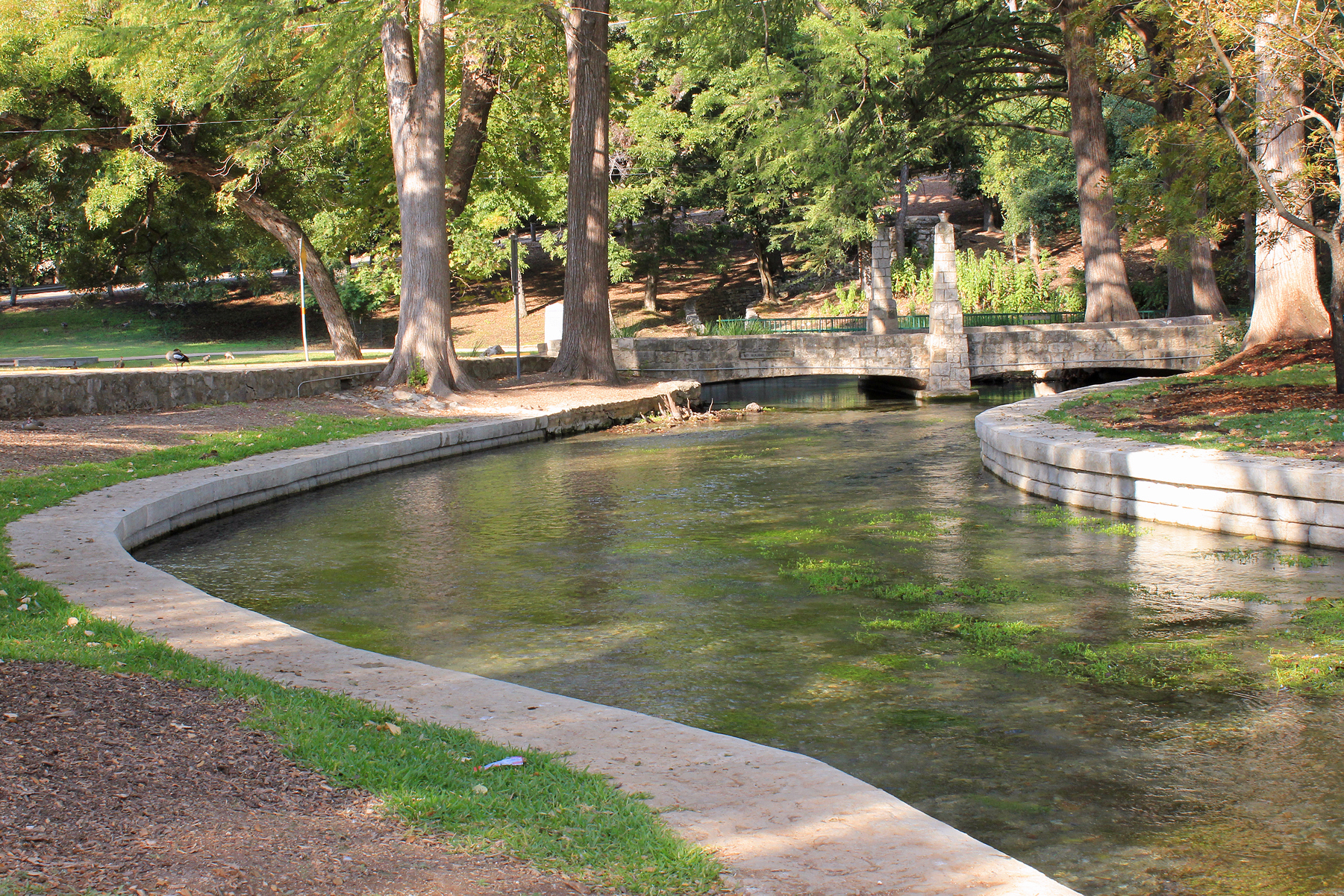
Comal River in Landa Park (2015)

The City of New Braunfels passed a construction bond in 1968 for $90,000 to demolish the antiquated bathhouse, baseball diamond, grandstand, peninsula playhouse, dancehall, and refreshments stand. The new pool, now known as the Bud Dallmann Olympic Pool, opened on Memorial Day, 1969.

In the present day, Landa Park serves New Braunfels citizens and tourists. Facilities include a playground, picnic sites, the original pre-1936 spring-fed pool, an Olympic-sized swimming pool built on the former ballpark site, paddle boats, a miniature train, restaurant, miniature golf, an eighteen-hole golf course, and tennis courts. Landa Park also includes public baseball fields. Landa Park became a registered arboretum in 1981 which includes many trees planted prior to 1927, and the park includes the Harry Landa Tree Trail and Panther Canyon Nature Trail. New Braunfels and Landa Park host annual community events including Wasserfest in June, Wurstfest in November, and Fourth of July fireworks.
