= Roy Bruner =

American baseball player (1917–1986)

- Pitcher
- Born: February 10, 1917; Cecilia, Kentucky
- Died: November 30, 1986 (aged 69); St. Matthews, Kentucky
- Batted: Right Threw: Right

MLB debut
- September 14, 1939, for the Philadelphia Phillies

Last MLB appearance
- June 8, 1941, for the Philadelphia Phillies

MLB statistics
- Win–loss record: 0–7
- Earned run average: 5.74
- Strikeouts: 28
- Stats at Baseball Reference

Teams
- Philadelphia Phillies (1939–1941)

Walter Roy Bruner (February 10, 1917 – November 30, 1986) was a Major League Baseball pitcher. Standing at 6 feet 0 inches (1.83 m) and 165 pounds (75 kg), Bruner played for the Philadelphia Phillies from 1939 to 1941. In 19 career games, he had a 0–7 record with a 5.74 ERA. He batted and threw right-handed.

Bruner left baseball to serve in World War II. He was a bomber pilot in the war and was shot down on at least one occasion. After the war he owned Bruner Aluminum Company, which manufactured storm windows until he closed the business at his retirement.
