= Bill Kerksieck =

American baseball player (1913-1970)

- Pitcher
- Born: December 6, 1913; Ulm, Arkansas
- Died: March 11, 1970 (aged 56); Stuttgart, Arkansas
- Batted: Right Threw: Right

MLB debut
- June 21, 1939, for the Philadelphia Phillies

Last MLB appearance
- September 30, 1939, for the Philadelphia Phillies

MLB statistics
- Win–loss record: 0–2
- Earned run average: 7.18
- Strikeouts: 13
- Stats at Baseball Reference

Teams
- Philadelphia Phillies (1939)

Wayman William Kerksieck (December 6, 1913 – March 11, 1970) was a pitcher in Major League Baseball. He played for the Philadelphia Phillies.
