= Oliver Hill (baseball) =

American baseball player (1909-1970)

- Pinch hitter
- Born: October 16, 1909; Powder Springs, Georgia, U.S.
- Died: September 20, 1970 (aged 60); Decatur, Georgia, U.S.
- Batted: Left Threw: Right

MLB debut
- April 19, 1939, for the Boston Bees

Last MLB appearance
- April 22, 1939, for the Boston Bees

MLB statistics
- Batting average: .500
- At bats: 2
- Doubles: 1
- Stats at Baseball Reference

Teams
- Boston Bees (1939)

Oliver Clinton Hill (October 16, 1909 – September 20, 1970) was an American Major League Baseball player. He appeared in two games for the Boston Bees in 1939, both times as a pinch hitter. In two at bats, he had one hit, a double, for a batting average of .500 and a slugging percentage of 1.000.

Hill had a long minor league career, playing at least from 1935 until 1948, with three seasons missed for World War II. In the minors, he began his career as a catcher, but became a third baseman by 1936. He played four seasons for the Atlanta Crackers of the Southern Association before being acquired by the Bees.

== Sources ==
- Career statistics from Baseball Reference · Baseball Reference (Minors) · Retrosheet · Baseball Almanac
