= LeGrant Scott =

American baseball player (1910-1993)

- Outfielder
- Born: July 25, 1910; Cleveland, Ohio, U.S.
- Died: November 12, 1993 (aged 83); Birmingham, Alabama, U.S.
- Batted: Left Threw: Left

MLB debut
- April 19, 1939, for the Philadelphia Phillies

Last MLB appearance
- August 5, 1939, for the Philadelphia Phillies

MLB statistics
- Batting average: .280
- Home runs: 1
- Runs batted in: 26
- Stats at Baseball Reference

Teams
- Philadelphia Phillies (1939)

LeGrant Edward Scott (July 25, 1910 – November 12, 1993) was an American professional baseball player. He was an outfielder for one season (1939) with the Philadelphia Phillies. For his career, he compiled a .280 batting average in 232 at-bats, with one home run and 26 runs batted in.

An alumnus of the University of Alabama, he was born in Cleveland, Ohio and died in Birmingham, Alabama, at the age of 83.
