= Len Gabrielson (first baseman) =

American baseball player (1915–2000)

- First baseman
- Born: September 8, 1915; Oakland, California, U.S.
- Died: November 14, 2000 (aged 85); Stanford, California, U.S.
- Batted: Left Threw: Left

MLB debut
- April 21, 1939, for the Philadelphia Phillies

Last MLB appearance
- April 25, 1939, for the Philadelphia Phillies

MLB statistics
- Batting average: .222
- Stats at Baseball Reference

Teams
- Philadelphia Phillies (1939)

Leonard Hilburne Gabrielson (September 8, 1915 – November 14, 2000) was an American first baseman in Major League Baseball who appeared in five games for the Philadelphia Phillies during the 1939 season.

Gabrielson's son, also named Len Gabrielson, spent nine seasons in Major League Baseball.
