= Otto Huber =

American baseball player (1914-1989)

- Second baseman / Third baseman
- Born: March 12, 1914; Garfield, New Jersey
- Died: April 9, 1989 (aged 75); Passaic, New Jersey
- Batted: Right Threw: Right

MLB debut
- June 10, 1939, for the Boston Bees

Last MLB appearance
- July 20, 1939, for the Boston Bees

MLB statistics
- Batting average: .273
- Home runs: 0
- Runs batted in: 3
- Stats at Baseball Reference

Teams
- Boston Bees (1939)

Otto Huber (March 12, 1914 – April 9, 1989) was a Major League Baseball player. He played one season with the Boston Bees from June 10 to July 20, 1939.
