= Jim Henry (baseball) =

American baseball player (1910–1976)

- Pitcher
- Born: June 26, 1910; Danville, Virginia, U.S.
- Died: August 15, 1976 (aged 66); Memphis, Tennessee, U.S.
- Batted: Right Threw: Right

MLB debut
- April 23, 1936, for the Boston Red Sox

Last MLB appearance
- May 27, 1939, for the Philadelphia Phillies

MLB statistics
- Win–loss record: 6–2
- Earned run average: 4.79
- Strikeouts: 51
- Stats at Baseball Reference

Teams
- Boston Red Sox (1936–1937); Philadelphia Phillies (1939)

James Francis Henry (June 26, 1910 – August 15, 1976) was an American pitcher in Major League Baseball who played between 1936 and 1939 for the Boston Red Sox (1936–37) and Philadelphia Phillies (1939). Listed at 6 ft 2 in (1.88 m), 175 lb (79 kg), Henry batted and threw right-handed. He was born in Danville, Virginia.

In a three-season career, Henry posted a 6–2 record with a 4.79 ERA in 33 appearances, including 11 starts, three complete games, eight games finished, one save, 51 strikeouts, 59 walks, and 114 2/3 innings of work.

Henry died in Memphis, Tennessee, of cancer at age 66.
