= Chet Clemens =

American baseball player (1917–2002)

- Left fielder
- Born: May 10, 1917; San Fernando, California, U.S.
- Died: February 10, 2002 (aged 84); San Clemente, California, U.S.
- Batted: Right Threw: Right

MLB debut
- September 13, 1939, for the Boston Bees

Last MLB appearance
- June 15, 1944, for the Boston Braves

MLB statistics
- Batting average: .200
- Home runs: 0
- Runs batted in: 3
- Stats at Baseball Reference

Teams
- Boston Bees/Braves (1939, 1944)

Chester Spurgeon Clemens (May 10, 1917 – February 10, 2002) was an American professional baseball player. He played parts of two seasons in Major League Baseball, primarily as an outfielder. He appeared in nine games for the Boston Braves (then known as the Bees) in 1939, then nineteen games in 1944, again for the Braves.
