= Chris Hartje =

American baseball player (1915-1946)

- Catcher
- Born: March 25, 1915; San Francisco, California, U.S.
- Died: June 26, 1946 (aged 31); Seattle, Washington, U.S.
- Batted: Right Threw: Right

MLB debut
- September 9, 1939, for the Brooklyn Dodgers

Last MLB appearance
- September 23, 1939, for the Brooklyn Dodgers

MLB statistics
- Batting average: .313
- Home runs: 0
- Runs batted in: 5
- Stats at Baseball Reference

Teams
- Brooklyn Dodgers (1939)

Christian Henry Hartje (March 25, 1915 – June 26, 1946) was an American professional baseball player, primarily in the minor leagues. Born in San Francisco, he was a catcher and played in nine games for the Brooklyn Dodgers in the major leagues in September during the 1939 baseball season.

After signing with the Spokane Indians of the Western International League in June 1946, Hartje died less than a week later when the team's bus crashed en route to a game. With nine team members killed and six injured, it was the worst accident in U.S. sports history at the time. Seriously injured and badly burned, Hartje was taken to Harborview Hospital in Seattle and died the following day, the ninth fatality.

Hartje served with the U.S. Coast Guard during World War II, and was buried in the Golden Gate National Cemetery in San Bruno, California. USA
