= Charlie Letchas =

American baseball player (1915–1995)

- Infielder
- Born: October 3, 1915; Thomasville, Georgia, U.S.
- Died: March 14, 1995 (aged 79); Tampa, Florida, U.S.
- Batted: Right Threw: Right

MLB debut
- September 16, 1939, for the Philadelphia Phillies

Last MLB appearance
- September 29, 1946, for the Philadelphia Phillies

MLB statistics
- Batting average: .234
- Home runs: 1
- Runs batted in: 37
- Stats at Baseball Reference

Teams
- Philadelphia Phillies (1939, 1944, 1946); Washington Senators (1941)

Charlie Letchas (October 3, 1915 – March 14, 1995) was an American professional baseball player. He was a second baseman, third baseman and shortstop for parts of four seasons (1939, 1941, 1944, 1946) with the Philadelphia Phillies and Washington Senators. For his career, he compiled a .234 batting average, with one home run and 37 runs batted in. In addition, Letchas played 16 seasons for 13 teams in the minor leagues.

He was born in Thomasville, Georgia and later died in Tampa, Florida at the age of 79.
