= Bill Clemensen =

American baseball player (1919–1994)

- Pitcher
- Born: June 20, 1919; New Brunswick, New Jersey, U.S.
- Died: February 18, 1994 (aged 74); Alta, California, U.S.
- Batted: Right Threw: Right

MLB debut
- May 22, 1939, for the Pittsburgh Pirates

Last MLB appearance
- April 21, 1946, for the Pittsburgh Pirates

MLB statistics
- Win–loss record: 1–1
- Earned run average: 5.57
- Strikeouts: 19
- Stats at Baseball Reference

Teams
- Pittsburgh Pirates (1939, 1941, 1946)

William Melville Clemensen (June 20, 1919 – February 18, 1994) was an American pitcher in Major League Baseball. He played for the Pittsburgh Pirates.

He graduated from Santa Cruz High School in 1935, where he was halfback on the football team, a starter on the basketball team, and a pitcher for the baseball team. He graduated when he was sixteen.
