= Red Juelich =

American baseball player (1916–1970)

- Second baseman
- Born: September 20, 1916; St. Louis, Missouri, U.S.
- Died: December 25, 1970 (aged 54); St. Louis, Missouri, U.S.
- Batted: Right Threw: Right

MLB debut
- May 30, 1939, for the Pittsburgh Pirates

Last MLB appearance
- September 27, 1939, for the Pittsburgh Pirates

MLB statistics
- Games played: 17
- Batting average: .239
- Runs batted in: 4
- Stats at Baseball Reference

Teams
- Pittsburgh Pirates (1939)

John Samuel "Red" Juelich (September 20, 1916 – December 25, 1970) was an American second baseman in Major League Baseball. He played for the Pittsburgh Pirates.
