= Hiker Moran =

American baseball player (1912-1998)

- Pitcher
- Born: January 1, 1912; Rochester, New York, U.S.
- Died: January 7, 1998 (aged 86); Saratoga Springs, New York, U.S.
- Batted: Right Threw: Right

MLB debut
- September 29, 1938, for the Boston Bees

Last MLB appearance
- October 1, 1939, for the Boston Bees

MLB statistics
- Win–loss record: 1–1
- Earned run average: 3.91
- Strikeouts: 4
- Stats at Baseball Reference

Teams
- Boston Bees (1938–1939)

Albert Thomas Moran (January 1, 1912 – January 7, 1998) was an American pitcher in Major League Baseball who played from 1938 to 1939 for the Boston Bees.
