= Whit Wyatt =

American baseball player (1907–1999)

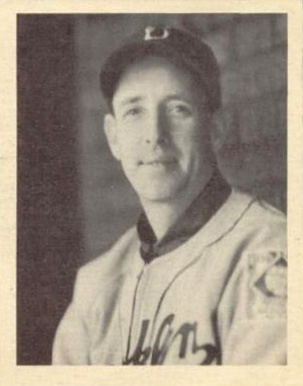
- Pitcher
- Born: September 27, 1907; Kensington, Georgia, U.S.
- Died: July 16, 1999 (aged 91); Carrollton, Georgia, U.S.
- Batted: Right Threw: Right

MLB debut
- September 16, 1929, for the Detroit Tigers

Last MLB appearance
- July 18, 1945, for the Philadelphia Phillies

MLB statistics
- Win–loss record: 106–95
- Earned run average: 3.79
- Strikeouts: 872
- Stats at Baseball Reference

Teams
- Detroit Tigers (1929–1933); Chicago White Sox (1933–1936); Cleveland Indians (1937); Brooklyn Dodgers (1939–1944); Philadelphia Phillies (1945)

Career highlights and awards
- 4× All-Star (1939–1942); NL wins leader (1941)

John Whitlow Wyatt (September 27, 1907 – July 16, 1999) was an American professional baseball pitcher. He played all or part of sixteen seasons in Major League Baseball for the Detroit Tigers (1929–33), Chicago White Sox (1933–36), Cleveland Indians (1937), Brooklyn Dodgers (1939–44), and Philadelphia Phillies (1945). While injuries sidetracked much of Wyatt's early career, he is most famous for his performance in 1941, when his team (the Dodgers) won the National League pennant.

== Early years ==
Wyatt was born in Kensington, Georgia, in 1907. As a high school pitching phenom at Cedartown High School, he once struck out 23 college hitters in a game. He attended the Georgia Institute of Technology in 1927.

== Professional career ==
=== American League ===
In 1928, Wyatt joined the Evansville Hubs in the Three-I League. After nearly two full seasons with Evansville, including a stretch in 1929 where he won sixteen straight games, he was acquired by the major league Detroit Tigers late in the 1929 season. He made four starts that September and October, going 0–1 with a 6.75 earned run average (ERA).

In 1930, Wyatt appeared in 21 games, including seven starts, posting a record of 4–5 with a 3.57 ERA. He spent most of 1931 in the minor leagues, leading the Texas League with a 1.53 ERA.

In 1932, Wyatt managed his first full season, appearing in 43 games, including 22 starts, with a 9–13 record and a 5.03 ERA. In 1933, he was traded in midseason to the White Sox, where he was used mostly in relief for the next several seasons. After spending most of 1936 back in the minor leagues, he was acquired by the Indians in the Rule 5 draft. He pitched in 29 games in 1937, then was back in the minor leagues in 1938. In the midst of an MVP season in the American Association, during which he won 23 games for the Milwaukee Brewers, he was purchased by the Brooklyn Dodgers.

=== National League ===
After going 8–3 in 16 games in 1939, Wyatt went 15–14 in 1940, leading the Dodger staff in innings and strikeouts. His best year was 1941, when he was 22–10 with a league-leading 7 shutouts. He was the winning pitcher in the only Dodgers victory against the New York Yankees in the 1941 World Series. He also pitched well in 1942, winning 19 games and leading the Dodgers in wins again. During his most productive period, 1940–43, Wyatt went 70–36 and led the league in shutouts twice.

In addition to being one of the best pitchers in the league, he also gained notoriety for head-hunting. When a beanball war broke out between frontrunners Brooklyn and St. Louis in 1941, Wyatt was at the forefront. Manager Leo Durocher would leave money on top of his locker after he hit batters. Joe DiMaggio faced Wyatt in only one World Series yet called him "the meanest guy [he] ever saw."

=== Overview ===
In a 16-season career, Wyatt posted a 106–95 record with 872 strikeouts and a 3.79 ERA in 1761 innings pitched, including 17 shutouts and 97 complete games. He was an above-average hitter for a pitcher, batting .219 (133-607) with 7 home runs and 69 runs batted in.

== Post-playing career ==
After retiring from the mound, Wyatt was a successful minor-league manager (his 1954 Atlanta Crackers won the Double-A Southern Association championship and Dixie Series), then spent over a decade as a pitching coach in the majors with the Philadelphia Phillies (1955–57) and the Milwaukee / Atlanta Braves (1958–67), notably serving on the pennant-winning 1958 Milwaukee Braves and as the first pitching coach for the relocated Atlanta Braves of 1966. He died of complications from pneumonia at the Tanner Medical Center in Carrollton, Georgia, at age 91.

== See also ==
- List of Major League Baseball annual shutout leaders

Sporting positions
Preceded by Red Evans	Brooklyn Dodgers Opening Day; Starting pitcher 1940–1941	Succeeded by Curt Davis
Preceded by Cy Perkins	Philadelphia Phillies pitching coach 1955–1957	Succeeded by Bill Posedel
Preceded by Charlie Root	Milwaukee/Atlanta Braves pitching coach 1958–1967	Succeeded by Harry Dorish
