= Ray Harrell =

American baseball player (1912–1984)

- Pitcher
- Born: February 16, 1912; Petrolia, Texas, U.S.
- Died: January 28, 1984 (aged 71); Alexandria, Louisiana, U.S.
- Batted: Right Threw: Right

MLB debut
- April 16, 1935, for the St. Louis Cardinals

Last MLB appearance
- July 22, 1945, for the New York Giants

MLB statistics
- Win–loss record: 9–20
- Earned run average: 5.70
- Strikeouts: 136
- Stats at Baseball Reference

Teams
- St. Louis Cardinals (1935, 1937–1938); Chicago Cubs (1939); Philadelphia Phillies (1939); Pittsburgh Pirates (1940); New York Giants (1945)

Raymond James Harrell (February 16, 1912 – January 28, 1984) was a pitcher in Major League Baseball. He played for the St. Louis Cardinals, Chicago Cubs, Philadelphia Phillies, Pittsburgh Pirates, and New York Giants.
