= Bud Hafey =

American baseball player (1912–1986)

- Outfielder
- Born: August 6, 1912; Berkeley, California, U.S.
- Died: July 27, 1986 (aged 73); Sacramento, California, U.S.
- Batted: Right Threw: Right

MLB debut
- April 21, 1935, for the Chicago White Sox

Last MLB appearance
- September 15, 1939, for the Philadelphia Phillies

MLB statistics
- Batting average: .213
- Home runs: 10
- Runs batted in: 33
- Stats at Baseball Reference

Teams
- Chicago White Sox (1935); Pittsburgh Pirates (1935–1936); Cincinnati Reds (1939); Philadelphia Phillies (1939)

Daniel Albert "Bud" Hafey (August 6, 1912 – July 27, 1986) was an American professional baseball outfielder in Major League Baseball. He played for the Chicago White Sox, Pittsburgh Pirates, Cincinnati Reds, and Philadelphia Phillies.
