= Max Butcher =

American baseball player (1910–1957)

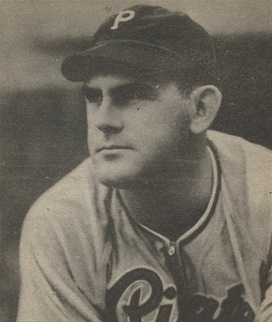
- Pitcher
- Born: September 21, 1910; Holden, West Virginia, U.S.
- Died: September 15, 1957 (aged 46); Logan, West Virginia, U.S.
- Batted: Right Threw: Right

MLB debut
- April 20, 1936, for the Brooklyn Dodgers

Last MLB appearance
- September 11, 1945, for the Pittsburgh Pirates

MLB statistics
- Win–loss record: 95–106
- Earned run average: 3.75
- Strikeouts: 485
- Stats at Baseball Reference

Teams
- Brooklyn Dodgers (1936–1938); Philadelphia Phillies (1938–1939); Pittsburgh Pirates (1939–1945)

Albert Maxwell Butcher (September 21, 1910 – September 15, 1957) was an American Major League Baseball pitcher for the Brooklyn Dodgers, Philadelphia Phillies and Pittsburgh Pirates from 1936 to 1945.

== Career ==
Butcher was the opposing pitcher on June 15, 1938, when left-hander Johnny Vander Meer of the visiting Cincinnati Reds threw a second consecutive no-hitter, a feat never duplicated in Major League Baseball since. Butcher was the starting pitcher for Brooklyn in front of an uncommonly large crowd of 38,748, it also being the first night game played at Ebbets Field.

Butcher bounced back from a 17-loss 1939 season in 1941 with a 17–12 record for the Pirates that included 19 complete games. In 1944, he went 13–11 for Pittsburgh and ranked among the league leaders in shutouts with five.

== Death ==
Butcher died at age 46 in Man, West Virginia, reportedly of a liver disease.
