= Vance Page =

American baseball player (1905–1951)

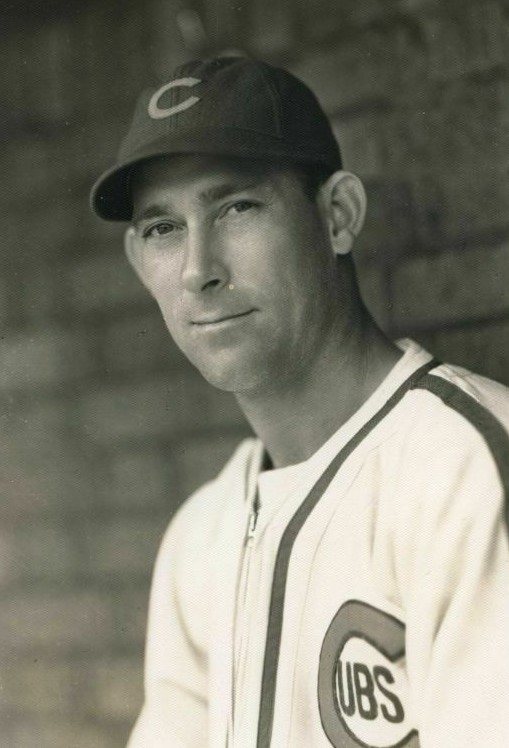
- Pitcher
- Born: September 15, 1905; Elm City, North Carolina, U.S.
- Died: July 14, 1951 (aged 45); Wilson, North Carolina, U.S.
- Batted: Right Threw: Right

MLB debut
- August 6, 1938, for the Chicago Cubs

Last MLB appearance
- August 6, 1941, for the Chicago Cubs

MLB statistics
- Win–loss record: 15–16
- Earned run average: 4.03
- Strikeouts: 100
- Stats at Baseball Reference

Teams
- Chicago Cubs (1938–1941)

Vance Linwood Page (September 15, 1905 – July 14, 1951), was a professional baseball player who played pitcher in the Major Leagues from 1938 to 1941. He played for the Chicago Cubs.

Born in Elm City, North Carolina, Page died from injuries he received when he fell off the roof of a barn in Wilson, North Carolina.

== Professional career ==
=== Major League Debut ===
Before making his debut, the Washington Senators traded Page to the Chicago Cubs on July 30, 1938, for Bob Logan, and cash.

On August 6, 1938, Vance Page made his MLB debut with the Chicago Cubs, playing the Boston Bees. Over 8 innings pitched, he gave up 11 hits, and 1 run, earning the loss.

=== World Series ===
Vance Page was part on the Cubs' World Series roster in 1938. During Game 4 on October 9, 1938, Page came in as a reliever, going 1.1 innings, and giving up 2 runs. It was his first and only World Series appearance.
