= Red Evans =

American baseball player (1906–1982)

- Pitcher
- Born: November 12, 1906; Chicago, Illinois, U.S.
- Died: June 14, 1982 (aged 75); Lakeview, Arkansas, U.S.
- Batted: Right Threw: Right

MLB debut
- April 24, 1936, for the Chicago White Sox

Last MLB appearance
- August 27, 1939, for the Brooklyn Dodgers

MLB statistics
- Win–loss record: 1–11
- Earned run average: 6.21
- Strikeouts: 47
- Stats at Baseball Reference

Teams
- Chicago White Sox (1936); Brooklyn Dodgers (1939)

Russell Edison "Red" Evans (November 12, 1906 – June 14, 1982) was an American professional baseball pitcher who played in Major League Baseball for the Brooklyn Dodgers and Chicago White Sox.

== Career ==
Evans started his professional career in the Mississippi Valley League in 1931. In 1935, he had a good season with the Oklahoma City Indians of the Texas League, going 24–8 with a 2.27 earned run average. This earned him a spot on the American League's White Sox the following season, but he pitched poorly and was sent back down to the minors.

In 1938, Evans had another good season, winning 21 games for the New Orleans Pelicans of the Southern Association. The Brooklyn Dodgers acquired him in the rule 5 draft that fall, and he started opening day for them in 1939. However, he got hammered that day and only started five more games that year, going 1–8 in the process. He was traded to the Boston Red Sox on September 1 and never played in the majors again.

After his baseball career he worked as a testing engineer for the Johnson Motor Company. He lived in Lakeview, Arkansas from 1969 until his death in 1982.

Preceded by Van Mungo	Brooklyn Dodgers Opening Day starting pitcher 1939	Succeeded by Whit Wyatt
