= Dick Errickson =

American baseball player (1912–1999)

- Pitcher
- Born: March 5, 1912; Vineland, New Jersey, U.S.
- Died: November 28, 1999 (aged 87); Vineland, New Jersey, U.S.
- Batted: Left Threw: Right

MLB debut
- April 27, 1938, for the Boston Bees

Last MLB appearance
- September 13, 1942, for the Chicago Cubs

MLB statistics
- Win–loss record: 36–47
- Earned run average: 3.85
- Strikeouts: 176
- Stats at Baseball Reference

Teams
- Boston Bees / Braves (1938–1942); Chicago Cubs (1942)

Richard Merriwell Errickson (March 5, 1912 – November 28, 1999), nicknamed "Lief", was a professional baseball player who played pitcher in the Major Leagues in 1938–42 playing for the Boston Bees/Braves and Chicago Cubs.

A native of Vineland, New Jersey, Errickson attended Vineland High School. He died in Vineland in 1999, aged 87.
