= Les Powers =

American baseball player (1909-1978)

- First baseman
- Born: November 5, 1909; Seattle, Washington
- Died: November 13, 1978 (aged 69); Santa Monica, California
- Batted: Left Threw: Left

MLB debut
- September 17, 1938, for the New York Giants

Last MLB appearance
- June 3, 1939, for the Philadelphia Phillies

MLB statistics
- Batting average: .327
- Home runs: 0
- Runs batted in: 2
- Stats at Baseball Reference

Teams
- New York Giants (1938); Philadelphia Phillies (1939)

Leslie Edwin Powers (November 5, 1909 – November 13, 1978) was a Major League Baseball first baseman. He played parts of two seasons in the majors, 1938 for the New York Giants and 1939 for the Philadelphia Phillies. He played in the minors from 1933 until 1945, including a brief stint as manager of the Bakersfield Badgers in 1941.

== Sources ==
- Career statistics from Baseball Reference · Baseball Reference (Minors) · Retrosheet · Baseball Almanac
