= Tom Earley =

American baseball player

- Pitcher
- Born: February 19, 1917; Boston, Massachusetts, U.S.
- Died: April 5, 1988 (aged 71); Nantucket, Massachusetts, U.S.
- Batted: Right Threw: Right

MLB debut
- September 27, 1938, for the Boston Bees

Last MLB appearance
- June 27, 1945, for the Boston Braves

MLB statistics
- Win–loss record: 18–24
- Earned run average: 3.78
- Strikeouts: 104
- Stats at Baseball Reference

Teams
- Boston Bees / Braves (1938–1942, 1945)

Thomas Francis Aloysius Earley (February 19, 1917 – April 5, 1988) was an American Major League Baseball pitcher. He played six seasons with the Boston Bees / Braves from 1938 to 1942 and 1945.

In between his playing days Earley served in the United States Navy during World War II from 1943 to 1944.
