= 1936 New York Giants (MLB) season =

1936 New York Giants
- National League champions
- League: National League
- Ballpark: Polo Grounds
- City: New York City
- Record: 92–62 (.597)
- Divisional place: 1st
- Owners: Horace Stoneham
- Managers: Bill Terry

The 1936 New York Giants season was the franchise's 54th season. The Giants went 92–62, and won the National League pennant. The team went on to lose to the New York Yankees in the World Series, four games to two.

== Regular season ==
Carl Hubbell became the first player to win two National League MVP Awards.

=== Season standings ===
National League
Team	W	L	Pct.	GB	Home	Road
New York Giants	92	62	.597	—	52‍–‍26	40‍–‍36
St. Louis Cardinals	87	67	.565	5	43‍–‍33	44‍–‍34
Chicago Cubs	87	67	.565	5	50‍–‍27	37‍–‍40
Pittsburgh Pirates	84	70	.545	8	46‍–‍30	38‍–‍40
Cincinnati Reds	74	80	.481	18	42‍–‍34	32‍–‍46
Boston Bees	71	83	.461	21	35‍–‍43	36‍–‍40
Brooklyn Dodgers	67	87	.435	25	37‍–‍40	30‍–‍47
Philadelphia Phillies	54	100	.351	38	30‍–‍48	24‍–‍52

=== Record vs. opponents ===
1936 National League record Sources:
Team	BSN	BRO	CHC	CIN	NYG	PHI	PIT	STL
Boston	—	10–12–2	6–16	13–9	9–13	12–10	8–14–1	13–9
Brooklyn	12–10–2	—	7–15	9–13	9–13	12–10	9–13	9–13
Chicago	16–6	15–7	—	10–12	11–11	16–6	10–12	9–13
Cincinnati	9–13	13–9	12–10	—	9–13	13–9	8–14	10–12
New York	13–9	13–9	11–11	13–9	—	17–5	15–7	10–12
Philadelphia	10–12	10–12	6–16	9–13	5–17	—	7–15	7–15
Pittsburgh	14–8–1	13–9	12–10	14–8	7–15	15–7	—	9–13–1
St. Louis	9–13	13–9	13–9	12–10	12–10	15–7	13–9–1	—

=== Roster ===
1936 New York Giants
Roster
Pitchers: 14 Slick Castleman; 15 Dick Coffman; 12 Freddie Fitzsimmons; 19 Frank Gabler; 10 Harry Gumbert; 11 Carl Hubbell; 16 Firpo Marberry; 17 Hal Schumacher; 18 Al Smith	Catchers: 9 Harry Danning; 8 Gus Mancuso; -- Jim Sheehan; 21 Roy Spencer; Infielders: 2 Dick Bartell; 21 Charlie English; 6 Travis Jackson; 22 Mark Koenig; 26 Sam Leslie; 20 Joe Martin; 20 Eddie Mayo; 25 Johnny McCarthy; 3 Bill Terry; 23 Burgess Whitehead	Outfielders: 24 Kiddo Davis; 5 Hank Leiber; 1 Jo-Jo Moore; 4 Mel Ott; 23 Jimmy Ripple; Other batters: -- Babe Young	Manager: 3 Bill Terry; Coaches: 30 Dolf Luque; 32 Frank Snyder

== Player stats ==
=== Batting ===
==== Starters by position ====
Note: Pos = Position; G = Games played; AB = At bats; H = Hits; Avg. = Batting average; HR = Home runs; RBI = Runs batted in

Pos	Player	G	AB	H	Avg.	HR	RBI
C	Gus Mancuso	139	519	156	.301	9	63
1B	Sam Leslie	117	417	123	.295	6	54
2B	Burgess Whitehead	154	632	176	.278	4	47
SS	Dick Bartell	145	510	152	.298	8	42
3B	Travis Jackson	126	465	107	.230	7	53
OF	Mel Ott	150	534	175	.328	33	135
OF	Jo-Jo Moore	152	649	205	.316	7	63
OF	Hank Leiber	101	337	94	.279	9	67

==== Other batters ====
Note: G = Games played; AB = At bats; H = Hits; Avg. = Batting average; HR = Home runs; RBI = Runs batted in

Player	G	AB	H	Avg.	HR	RBI
Jimmy Ripple	96	311	95	.305	7	47
Bill Terry	79	229	71	.310	2	39
Eddie Mayo	46	141	28	.199	1	8
Harry Danning	32	69	11	.159	0	4
Kiddo Davis	47	67	16	.239	0	5
Mark Koenig	42	58	16	.276	1	7
Roy Spencer	19	18	5	.278	0	3
Johnny McCarthy	4	16	7	.438	1	2
Joe Martin	7	15	4	.267	0	2
Jim Sheehan	1	4	0	.000	0	0
Babe Young	1	1	0	.000	0	0
Charlie English	1	1	0	.000	0	0

=== Pitching ===
==== Starting pitchers ====
Note: G = Games pitched; IP = Innings pitched; W = Wins; L = Losses; ERA = Earned run average; SO = Strikeouts

Player	G	IP	W	L	ERA	SO
Carl Hubbell	42	304.0	26	6	2.31	123
Hal Schumacher	35	215.1	11	13	3.47	75
Al Smith	43	209.1	14	13	3.78	89
Freddie Fitzsimmons	28	141.0	10	7	3.32	35

==== Other pitchers ====
Note: G = Games pitched; IP = Innings pitched; W = Wins; L = Losses; ERA = Earned run average; SO = Strikeouts

Player	G	IP	W	L	ERA	SO
Frank Gabler	43	161.2	9	8	3.12	46
Harry Gumbert	39	140.2	11	3	3.90	52
Slick Castleman	29	111.2	4	7	5.64	54

==== Relief pitchers ====
Note: G = Games pitched; W = Wins; L = Losses; SV = Saves; ERA = Earned run average; SO = Strikeouts

Player	G	W	L	SV	ERA	SO
Dick Coffman	24	7	5	7	3.90	26
Firpo Marberry	1	0	0	0	0.00	0

== 1936 World Series ==
=== Game 1 ===
September 30, 1936, at the Polo Grounds in New York City

Team	1	2	3	4	5	6	7	8	9	R	H	E
New York (A)	0	0	1	0	0	0	0	0	0	1	7	2
New York (N)	0	0	0	0	1	1	0	4	x	6	9	1
W: Carl Hubbell (1–0) L: Red Ruffing (0–1)
HR: NYY George Selkirk (1) – NYG – Dick Bartell (1)

=== Game 2 ===
October 2, 1936, at the Polo Grounds in New York City

Team	1	2	3	4	5	6	7	8	9	R	H	E
New York (A)	2	0	7	0	0	1	2	0	6	18	17	0
New York (N)	0	1	0	3	0	0	0	0	0	4	6	1
W: Lefty Gomez (1–0) L: Hal Schumacher (0–1)
HR: NYY – Tony Lazzeri (1), Bill Dickey (1)

=== Game 3 ===
October 3, 1936, at Yankee Stadium in New York City

Team	1	2	3	4	5	6	7	8	9	R	H	E
New York (N)	0	0	0	0	1	0	0	0	0	1	11	0
New York (A)	0	1	0	0	0	0	0	1	x	2	4	0
W: Bump Hadley (1–0) L: Freddie Fitzsimmons (0–1) S: Pat Malone (1)
HR: NYG – Jimmy Ripple (1) NYY – Lou Gehrig (1)

=== Game 4 ===
October 4, 1936, at Yankee Stadium in New York City

Team	1	2	3	4	5	6	7	8	9	R	H	E
New York (N)	0	0	0	1	0	0	0	1	0	2	7	1
New York (A)	0	1	3	0	0	0	0	1	x	5	10	1
W: Monte Pearson (1–0) L: Carl Hubbell (1–1)
HR: NYY – Lou Gehrig (2)

=== Game 5 ===
October 5, 1936, at Yankee Stadium in New York City

Team	1	2	3	4	5	6	7	8	9	10	R	H	E
New York (N)	3	0	0	0	0	1	0	0	0	1	5	8	3
New York (A)	0	1	1	0	0	2	0	0	0	0	4	10	1
W: Hal Schumacher (1–1) L: Pat Malone (0–1)
HR: NYY – George Selkirk (2)

=== Game 6 ===
October 6, 1936, at the Polo Grounds in New York City

Team	1	2	3	4	5	6	7	8	9	R	H	E
New York (A)	0	2	1	2	0	0	0	1	7	13	17	2
New York (N)	2	0	0	0	1	0	1	1	0	5	9	1
W: Lefty Gomez (2–0) L: Freddie Fitzsimmons (0–2) S: Johnny Murphy (1)
HR: NYY – Jake Powell (1) NYG – Mel Ott (1), Jo-Jo Moore (1)

== Award winners ==
- Carl Hubbell, National League MVP

== Farm system ==
Level	Team	League	Manager
AA	San Francisco Seals	Pacific Coast League	Lefty O'Doul
C	Greenwood Giants	Cotton States League	Frank Brazill
C	Tyler Trojans	West Dixie League	Wally Dashiell
C	Muskogee Tigers	Western Association	David Miner and Carl Kentling
D	Tallahassee Capitols	Georgia–Florida League	Dutch Hofmann
D	Portageville-Owensboro Pirates	KITTY League	Hughie Wise

LEAGUE CHAMPIONS: Tallahassee

Portageville franchise transferred to Owensboro, July 17, 1936
