= Pat Malone =

American baseball player (1902–1943)

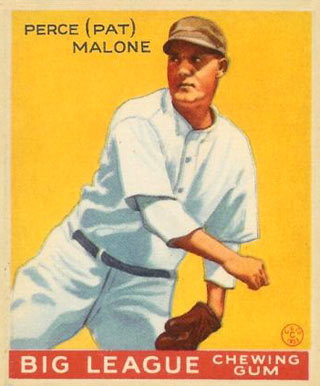
- 1933 baseball card of Malone
- Pitcher
- Born: September 25, 1902; Altoona, Pennsylvania, U.S.
- Died: May 13, 1943 (aged 40); Altoona, Pennsylvania, U.S.
- Batted: Left Threw: Right

MLB debut
- April 12, 1928, for the Chicago Cubs

Last MLB appearance
- September 28, 1937, for the New York Yankees

MLB statistics
- Win–loss record: 134–92
- Earned run average: 3.74
- Strikeouts: 1,024
- Stats at Baseball Reference

Teams
- Chicago Cubs (1928–1934); New York Yankees (1935–1937)

Career highlights and awards
- World Series champion (1936); 2× NL wins leader (1929, 1930); NL strikeout leader (1929)

Perce Leigh "Pat" Malone (September 25, 1902 – May 13, 1943) was an American pitcher in Major League Baseball who played from for the Chicago Cubs (1928–1934) and New York Yankees (1935–1937). Listed at 6 feet 0 inches (1.83 m) and 200 pounds (91 kg), Malone batted left-handed and threw right-handed. He played for four pennant winners and two World Series champions.

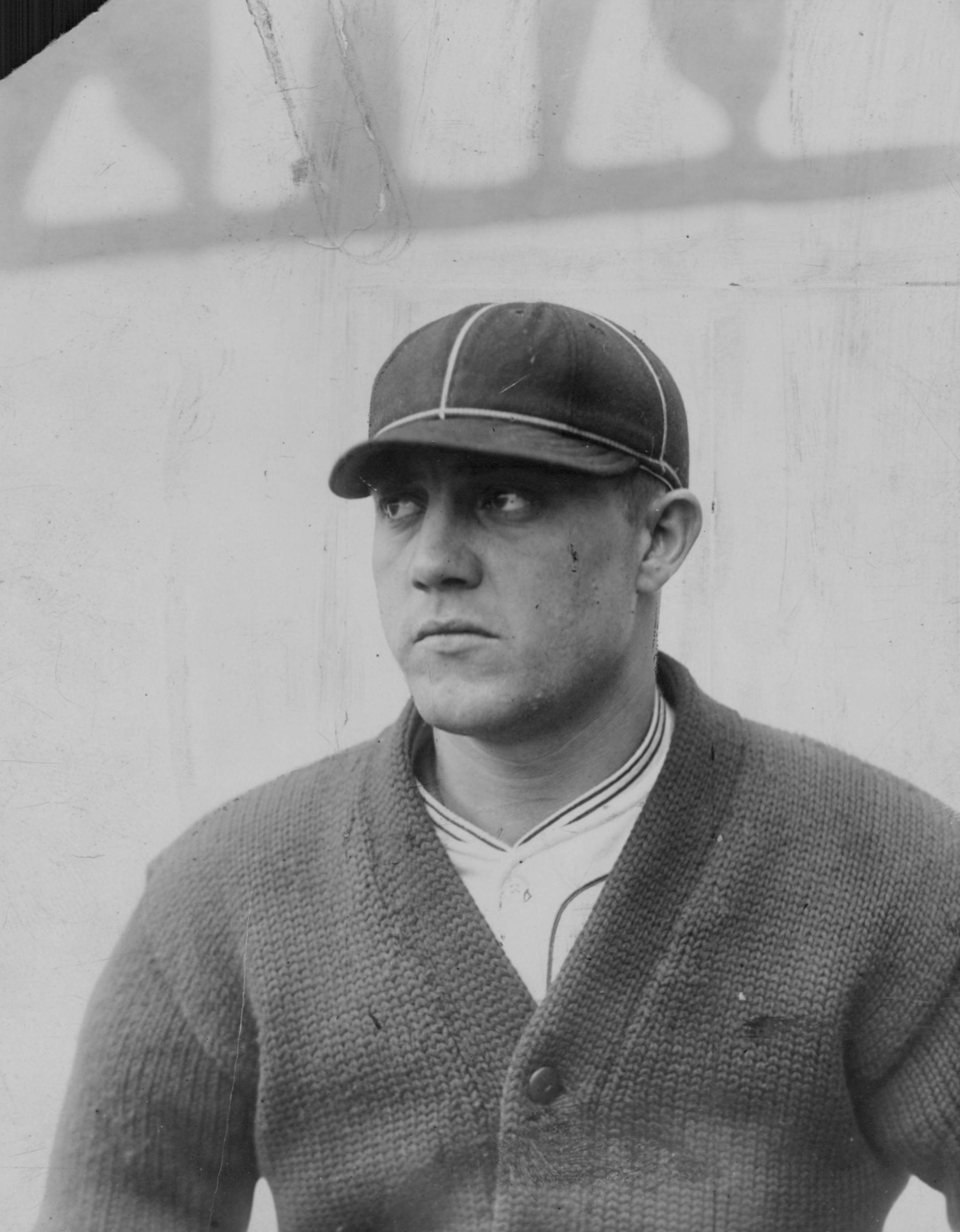
Pat Malone with the Minneapolis Millers, 1920s

Born in Altoona, Pennsylvania, Malone started playing semipro baseball when a teenager. Initially signed by the New York Giants in 1922, his hard-drinking lifestyle brought him in conflict with manager John McGraw, who sold his contract to the minor league Minneapolis Millers after 1924 spring training. Malone would spend six years in the minor leagues, but after successful seasons in 1926 and 1927, was signed by the Cubs before the 1928 season.

As a rookie with the Cubs, Malone won 18 games and finished second to Dazzy Vance in the National League (NL) with 155 strikeouts. In 1929, a year in which the Cubs won the pennant, he led the NL in wins (22), shutouts (5), and strikeouts (166), becoming the league's first strikeout champion besides Vance in seven years. He made two starts in the World Series against the Philadelphia Athletics but lost both, and the Cubs were defeated in five games. In 1930, he led the NL with 20 wins. The 1931 season saw him clash with new Cubs manager Rogers Hornsby; Malone became involved in further trouble in September when he beat up two reporters and was fined $500. He nonetheless posted a 16–9 record. In 1932, Malone had a 15–17 record and 3.38 earned run average (ERA), but was relegated to the bullpen for the World Series against the Yankees when the Cubs selected three other starters. Relieving Charlie Root after the starter gave up Babe Ruth's called shot, Malone pitched 2 2/3 scoreless innings in his only appearance of the series; the Cubs were defeated in four straight games.

Struggles in late 1933 caused Malone to lose his rotation spot in September. He enjoyed a 14–7 record and a 3.53 ERA in 1934 but again lost his rotation spot in September, which he claimed was due to the Cubs not wanting him to gain bonuses for winning 15 or more games. Acquired by the Yankees before the 1935 season, Malone was used mainly as a reliever for the next three years. He led the American League (AL) in saves in 1936 and was on the Yankee roster when they beat the Giants in the World Series. He did less well in 1937, however, and was left off the roster when the Yankees again beat the Giants in the World Series. After one more season in the minor leagues, Malone retired. He returned to Altoona, where he operated a tavern before dying at the age of 40 in 1943 due to acute pancreatitis brought on by his life of heavy drinking.

== Early life ==
Perce Leigh Malone was the second child of Christian and Anna Malone, born on September 25, 1902, in Altoona, Pennsylvania. His father was an assistant yard master for the Pennsylvania Railroad, and his mother and sister, Evelyn, also supported the family through odd jobs. Loathing the name "Perce," Malone insisted on being called "Pat" instead.

A rather wild youth, Malone enjoying participating in fights. He led a gang of local boys who would steal food and carry it to their hideout in a ravine out of town, where they would plan their next move. Malone attended school only until the age of 14, dropping out to take a job with Adam's Express, a package-delivery service. Soon, Malone had begun playing baseball, joining a local semipro team when he was just 15. "I caught the ball and let loose with a peg to first base with such speed that George Quinn, the manager, immediately decided a fellow with an arm like that ought to be a pitcher", Malone later remembered. He started working for the Pennsylvania Railroad as a fireman at age 16, lying about his age to get the job. Then, he served a year in the United States Army, which assigned him to Fort Douglas in Utah. While in the Army, Malone participated in sports such as baseball, football, and boxing.

Returning to Altoona after his military service, Malone resumed his job with the Pennsylvania Railroad, boxed under the name "Kid Williams," and played football in Huntingdon, Pennsylvania, at Juniata College. He also played baseball for the semipro Altoona Independents, with whom he excelled. Pat Blake, a friend of his, recommended the pitcher to the management of the Knoxville Pioneers, a Class D team in the Appalachian League. Knoxville took Blake's advice, and the Pioneers signed Malone to pitch for them in 1921.

== Minor League career ==
In 28 games for Knoxville in 1921, Malone had a 13–12 record, a 2.96 earned run average (ERA), and 183 hits allowed in 219 innings pitched. Dick Kinsella, a scout for the New York Giants, recommended him to the major league team, who purchased Malone's rights before the 1922 season.

Malone attended spring training for the Giants in 1922 but made a disfavorable impression on manager John McGraw, who rebuked him for his heavy drinking and rowdy behavior. He began the year with the Waterbury Brasscos of the Class A Eastern League. In 24 games for the club, he pitched excellently, accruing just a 6–8 record but a 2.31 ERA in 140 innings pitched. Reports of his disorderly behavior got back to McGraw, however, who threatened to suspend Malone on general principles. Instead, Malone told McGraw he was quitting and returned to Altoona to play semipro ball. He refused to return to the Giants unless the organization promoted him to the Toledo Mud Hens of the Class AA American Association. The Giants agreed, and Malone went to Toledo, where he posted an 11.25 ERA in three games before the season ended.

In 1923, Malone again went to spring training for the Giants but was sent to Toledo to start the season. He spent the whole year with the Mud Hens, but did not pitch well. Malone posted a 9–21 record and a 5.64 ERA, ranking among the league leaders with 21 losses (tied with three other pitchers behind Eric Erickson's 25), 120 walks (fourth, behind Dan Tipple's 170, Joe Giard's 153, and Ferdie Schupp's 142), and 151 earned runs allowed (first). He joined the Giants in spring training for a final time in 1924, but he repeatedly violated his curfew, partying at the Watrous Hotel. These violations were the last straw for McGraw, and the Giants sold his contract to the American Association's Minneapolis Millers.

The next two seasons were not good ones for Malone. Spending most of 1924 with Minneapolis, Malone posted a 2–9 record and an 8.30 ERA over 77 innings pitched in 20 games. He also made three appearances for the Beaumont Exporters of the Class A Texas League, with whom he had a 1–1 record and a 6.50 ERA. In 1925, he spent most of the season in the Texas League again, this time with the Shreveport Sports, for whom he pitched in 33 games (25 starts). He had a 12–13 record, a 4.83 ERA, and 219 hits allowed in 190 innings pitched. Also making four appearances for Minneapolis, Malone had an 0–2 record and a 9.33 ERA.

In 1926, Malone joined another Class A team, the Des Moines Demons of the Western League. Improved control of his fastball resulted in a lower number of walks and his most successful season to date. In 52 games for the team, he had a 28–13 record and a 2.84 ERA, finishing second in the league in wins (behind Herb Hall's 29) and innings pitched (349, one shy of Al Pallas's 350). Malone was selected to the league's first All-Star team, and his strong pitching helped Des Moines win the league pennant.

Back in Minneapolis for 1927, Malone finally stuck with the Millers for a full season. He had a 20–18 record and a 3.98 ERA for the ballclub, ranking among the league leaders with 20 wins (tied with Paul Zahniser for fifth), 319 innings pitched (fourth behind Tom Sheehan's 331, Jimmy Zinn's 330, and Roy Meeker's 323), and 53 games (second only to Leo Moon's 55). Most notably, he led the American Association with 214 strikeouts. Team owner Mike Kelley eagerly began offering Malone's contract rights for sale to major league clubs, eventually selling them to the Chicago Cubs, whose manager, Joe McCarthy, was a good friend of Kelley. The Cubs paid Minneapolis $25,000 total, with $15,000 up front and the rest due by the next season's trade deadline of June 15, unless the Cubs were dissatisfied with Malone and wished to return him to the Millers instead.

== Chicago Cubs (1928–1934) ==
=== 1928 ===
The Cubs considered using Malone as a starter to begin 1928, but control issues in spring training caused him to open the season in the bullpen. He made his major league debut on April 12, relieving Percy Jones with one out in the seventh inning in a game against the Cincinnati Reds. Due to errors by his fielders, he allowed six runs, none earned. Malone lost that game, along with his next four decisions. Things turned around for him on May 6, when he struck out eight Philadelphia Phillies over five innings of relief and earned his first win in a 5–4 victory. Getting a start against the Giants on May 12, he "pitched for Chicago in a masterly manner" according to The New York Times, allowing just six hits and two runs in a complete game, 4–2 victory. Five days later, he pitched his first major league shutout, holding the Boston Braves to two hits in a 2–0 victory that was Chicago's 11th straight win.

As the season progressed, Malone was used more and more as a starter. He "proved to be the Cubs’ most successful and consistent pitcher, especially during the pennant race in the last two months of the 1928 season" according to Gregory H. Wolf of the Society for American Baseball Research. Malone won nine of his last 10 decisions, posted a 2.41 ERA in the season's final two months, and completed eight of his final nine starts. Though the Cubs finished the season in third place, they were only four games behind the first-place St. Louis Cardinals. In 42 games (25 starts), Malone had an 18–13 record and a 2.84 ERA. He led the Cubs in wins, games, and innings pitched (250 2/3). Amongst other National League (NL) pitchers, Malone trailed only Dazzy Vance for the league lead with 155 strikeouts and 5.56 strikeouts per nine innings pitched.

=== 1929 ===
Malone got off to a strong start in 1929, this time winning his first five starts, two of which were shutouts. He struck out 12 batters on June 12 in a complete game, 7–3 victory over the Phillies. One week later, in his next start, he struck out 10 batters in a complete game, 7–3 victory over the Cardinals in which the only runs he allowed were unearned. He completed his last five starts of the season, winning four of them. On September 19, he displayed "a rare exhibition of pitching skill" according to sportswriter John Drebinger, allowing just six hits in a 5–0 victory over the Giants, his fifth shutout and 22nd win of the year. He finished the year with a 22–10 record and a 3.57 ERA, leading the NL in wins, shutouts, and strikeouts (166). By winning the strikeout title, he became the first pitcher besides Vance to do so in the NL since 1921. Behind his stellar pitching, the Cubs won the NL pennant.

In the 1929 World Series, the Cubs faced the Philadelphia Athletics, who were heavily favored. After Philadelphia won Game 1, Malone started Game 2 of the series but struggled, allowing six runs (three earned), five hits, and five walks in 3 2/3 innings and taking the loss in the team's 9–3 defeat. With the Cubs down two games to one entering Game 4, Malone came on in relief in the bottom of the seventh inning, with the game tied at eight runs per side. Malone first hit Bing Miller with a pitch to load the bases, then gave up a double to Jimmie Dykes that scored the winning runs in Philadelphia's 10–8 triumph. With the Cubs one loss away from elimination, Malone started Game 5. Staked to a 2–0 lead in the fourth inning, he had allowed only two hits and two runs going to the ninth. After striking out Walter French to start the inning, however, he gave up a single to Max Bishop, followed by a two-run home run by Mule Haas which tied the game. He then allowed two more baserunners and took the loss when Miller recorded an RBI double, giving the Athletics the championship in five games.

=== 1930 ===
On April 25, 1930, Malone pitched 12 innings against the Cincinnati Reds; he lost the lead in the top of the inning when he allowed an unearned run, but won after the Cubs scored two runs in the bottom of the inning to secure a 6–5 victory. In early May, he was arrested for disorderly conduct in a café on Chicago's South Side, though he paid the bill for the damages upon his release from jail. He won four straight starts from June 14 through June 28, then won eight straight decisions from July 16 through August 29. The last of these, a two-inning relief stint in a game the Cubs won in walk-off fashion over the Cardinals in the bottom of the 13th inning, gave Chicago a 5 1/2 game lead over St. Louis for first place. The Cubs slumped in September, however, starting the month 9–13. Malone lost his first three decisions of the month, though he won his last three. It was not enough for the pennant, though, as St. Louis won 21 of its final 25 games to take first place in the league.

Malone was "the NL's most dominant pitcher" in 1930, according to Wolf. He led the league with 20 wins and finished in third place with 142 strikeouts, surpassed only by Bill Hallahan (177) and Vance (173). He also tied Erv Brame for the lead in complete games, with 22. Malone's record was 20–9, and his ERA was 3.94.

=== 1931 ===
With four games remaining in 1930, the Cubs fired McCarthy, replacing him as their manager with Rogers Hornsby. Blaming the poor conditioning of the pitchers for the team's struggles that September, Hornsby tried to get the pitchers in better shape in 1931 spring training. Malone, however, was unable to pitch much because of shoulder problems. By the end of May, he had only three wins, though he also had only two losses. On June 26, after he lasted only 1/3 of an inning against Boston and allowed four runs, Hornsby suggested that the pitcher was overrated, calling his performance "distasteful".

During his time with the Cubs, Malone had become best friends with star hitter Hack Wilson, who shared the pitcher's love of heavy drinking. They got into trouble together on September 5 when the team was on a road trip. Aboard a passenger coach in Cincinnati, the two ran across Wayne K. Otto of the Herald Examiner and Harold Johnson of the Chicago American. According to the players, the writers were criticizing them for their poor performance and out-of-control alcohol consumption. The reporters maintained that Wilson was in a bad mood, as Hornsby had recently benched him. Whatever the case, a fight broke out, resulting in Malone thoroughly pounding both reporters. The Cubs fined Malone $500 for his behavior and suspended Wilson. Said teammate Gabby Hartnett, "Everybody in the league knows not to mess with either of them. Hack is as strong as they come, and Pat, with that Irish temper of his, he wouldn't hesitate to punch a bull right between the eyes. They really should have known better."

The fight did not bother Malone's pitching, as he won his final three starts and his final four appearances of the season. In 36 games (30 starts), he had a 16–9 record and a 3.90 ERA. Though he struck out only 112 batters, that was good enough to tie him with Ed Brandt for eighth in the NL. He also tied Bill Walker and teammate Guy Bush for ninth in the NL in victories.

=== 1932 ===
Before the 1932 season, the Cubs traded Wilson, hoping that this would help Malone stop partying so much. On May 7, Malone struck out a season-high eight batters in a 3–0 shutout win over the Brooklyn Dodgers. His record was just 10–10 through July, and the rest of the ballclub was playing mediocrely. At that point, the Cubs replaced Hornsby as manager with Charlie Grimm, who was far more easygoing with the players. The ballclub won 23 of its next 28 games and took over first place in the NL. The first of these wins was a complete game thrown by Malone against the Phillies on August 4; though he struck out only one batter, he allowed only one run. Facing the Phillies again on August 23, Malone tied his season high with eight strikeouts in a 5–1 win. Though he won only five games under Grimm, the Cubs continued to play well and finished the season as NL champions for the second time in Malone's duration with the team. In 37 games (32 starts), he had a 15–17 record and a 3.38 ERA. His 17 losses tied Red Lucas for second in the NL (behind Ownie Carroll's 19), but his 15 wins tied Flint Rhem and teammate Charlie Root for eighth, and his 120 strikeouts were third (behind Dizzy Dean's 191 and Carl Hubbell's 137).

In the World Series against the Yankees, Malone saw little action, as Grimm went with a three-man starting rotation of Bush, Lon Warneke, and Root. His only appearance in that series came after Root surrendered back-to-back home runs to Babe Ruth and Lou Gehrig in Game 3, the former of which was Babe Ruth's called shot. After Gehrig's home run, the Cubs brought in Malone, who threw 2 2/3 innings of scoreless relief, including a called third strike against Gehrig. The Cubs nonetheless lost the game 7–5 and were swept by the Yankees in four games.

=== 1933 ===
Malone started the 1933 season still a Cub, despite rumors that the Phillies, Reds, and Braves were all interested in signing him. Shoulder problems plagued him all season, leading to inconsistent pitching. He won four consecutive complete games from May 21 through June 4, one of which (on May 25) was a two-hit shutout of the Braves. Later, he won three starts in a row from July 23 through August 6. He lost three decisions in a row from April 25 through May 16, however, six decisions in a row from June 9 through July 16, and five decisions in a row from August 12 through September 1. During the last stretch, his ERA was 8.49. He made no starts after September 1, serving the rest of the year out of the bullpen and appearing in just three more games, though two of these were wins. In 31 games (26 starts) and 186 1/3 innings pitched, he had a 10–14 record and a 3.91 ERA. He recorded just 72 strikeouts during the season, and his 3.5 strikeouts per nine innings pitched would be the lowest in any of his seasons.

=== 1934 ===
Malone was late reporting to 1934 spring training as he sought more money, causing Edward Burns of the Chicago Daily Tribune to call him "hard to handle” and “frivolous in nature". He was moved to the bullpen after four starts, but rejoined the rotation in June when Bush was sidelined with a rib injury. From July 19 through August 18, Malone won six decisions in a row; the Cubs won all seven of his starts during the streak. The last game of the streak, against the Phillies, was what Wolf called "arguably the most dominant game in his career". Malone allowed just two hits and no runs, tying his career high with 12 strikeouts in a 2–0 victory. He gave up six runs in his next start against the Dodgers on August 24, however, and was used only twice more all year, both times in relief. The Cubs never explained why they stopped using Malone, but the pitcher claimed the team was ensuring he would not receive contractual bonuses that he would have become eligible with each win starting with his 15th. When The Sporting News inquired on October 25 where he would be pitching next year, he responded, "Anywhere will do just as long as it isn't with the Cubs." In 34 games (21 starts) and 191 innings pitched, he had a 14–7 record and a 3.53 ERA. His 111 strikeouts ranked eighth in the NL.

On October 26, 1934, Malone was traded with cash to the St. Louis Cardinals for Ken O'Dea. The Cardinals wanted him to take a 50 percent pay cut, but he refused, even after no team claimed him on waivers. He eventually reached an agreement with the Cardinals, but he would never pitch for them, as his contract was sold to the Yankees on March 26, 1935.

During his time with the Cubs, Malone (along with Bush and Root) formed part of what Wolf called "the NL’s most successful and durable pitching trio from 1928 to 1934". Each of the starters won at least 100 games over that span, and they combined to win 336 total in 4,776 innings pitched. The team reached the World Series twice during those years.

== New York Yankees (1935–1937) ==
=== 1935 ===
The trade to New York reunited Malone with McCarthy, who had been trying to acquire the pitcher since the previous season. McCarthy expected that Malone could win 15 games but was disappointed to discover that the pitcher had shoulder issues. Malone made only two starts in 1935, both losses in which he allowed five runs, and he spent most of the season in the bullpen. His ERA was 3.92 through August 7, but he posted a 7.79 ERA in his final eight games and pitched only once in September. In 29 games (two starts) and 56 1/3 innings pitched, he had a 3–5 record, a 5.43 ERA, and 25 strikeouts.

=== 1936 ===
Despite Malone's lackluster performance the previous season, the Yankees gave Malone another chance in 1936. "I am going to pitch Malone into winning form or run him out of the league", promised McCarthy. Though his weight had ballooned from 200 to 230 pounds, Malone fixed one source of bad health, replacing his rotten teeth, which had been giving him headaches. On April 25, after Monte Pearson allowed four runs in the first two innings and allowed the first two batters of the third to reach base, Malone entered and pitched six innings without giving up an earned run against the Boston Red Sox. Though the Yankees lost 7–2, it was Malone's best outing since his shutout of the Phillies two years earlier. McCarthy gave him a start against the St. Louis Browns on May 5, and "the burly right-hander came through with a sparkling eight-hit performance", according to sportswriter Louis Effrat. Malone struck out nine in a complete game, 8–2 triumph. A week later, however, Malone gave up seven runs to the Browns in a 7–0 loss. He then gave up at least six runs for three starts in a row, from May 23 through June 2, though he was 2–0 in them. His record was 8–2 at the All-Star break, despite a 5.54 ERA. In the second half of the year, he "played an important role as a fireman", according to Wolf. In 68 innings pitched out of the bullpen, his ERA was 2.12. Used as a starter in his final two games of the year, he gave up 11 and 15 hits respectively but only four and three runs. Both outings were complete game victories. In 35 games (nine starts) for the pennant winners, he had a 12–4 record, a 3.81 ERA, and 72 strikeouts in 134 2/3 innings pitched. His .750 winning percentage made him one of three Yankees to finish atop the AL in that category, along with Bump Hadley (.778) and Pearson (.731). Malone also led the league with nine saves, though this was not yet an official statistic.

The Yankees faced the Giants in the 1936 World Series, the first time since 1923 the series involved exclusively New York teams. Malone recorded a save in Game 3, relieving starting pitcher Hadley at the start of the ninth inning and throwing a scoreless inning to cement a 2–1 win. In Game 5, he was the hard-luck loser. He worked four innings of one-hit relief, but the hit, an RBI double by Bill Terry, came in the top of the 10th inning and resulted in the Giants staving off elimination. The Yankees then won Game 6 and the series, giving Malone his first World Series championship.

=== 1937 ===
Prior to the 1937 season, The Sporting News portrayed Malone as a "stout-hearted has-been of another era". In his first outing, on April 25, Malone relieved Hadley with two outs in the fifth inning with two outs and the bases loaded after the starter had issued three straight walks, the latter two forcing in runs to trim a 5–0 lead over the Red Sox to 5–2. Malone struck out Fabian Gaffke to end the inning, then issued one run in the remaining four innings, earning the victory in a 9–3 triumph. The April 25 outing would be a rare bright spot, as according to Wolf, he was "unable to duplicate the magic from the previous season". His final appearance of the year came in the second game of a doubleheader against the Washington Senators on September 28, when he allowed two hits but no runs in one inning of a 2–1 defeat. In 28 games (nine starts), he had a 4–4 record, six saves, a 5.48 ERA, and 49 strikeouts in a mere 92 innings pitched. He was left off the roster for the 1937 World Series, in which the Yankees again defeated the Giants.

== Final professional season (1938) ==
Malone's tenure with the Yankees ended when he was released on January 20, 1938. The McCarthy-Kelley friendship proved helpful again, as the Yankee manager convinced Minneapolis to reacquire him. Malone drew a suspension from the team before the start of the season due to a drunken fight he was involved in at the team's hotel, and after pitching just one game for the Millers, he quit the team in April.

When the Baltimore Orioles of the Class AA International League bought his contract, Malone reported to them, splitting the rest of the season between them and the Chattanooga Lookouts of the Class A1 Southern Association. At Chattanooga, his manager was Hornsby, whom Malone had clashed with during his time in Chicago. In 19 games (11 starts) with Baltimore, he had a 3–8 record and a 5.24 ERA in 79 innings pitched. His record was also 3–8 in 16 games with Chattanooga, where he had a 3.83 ERA in 94 innings. The Orioles sold his contract to the Oakland Oaks of the Class AA Pacific Coast League after the season, but Malone retired on February 20, 1939.

== Career statistics ==
In a 10-season major league career, Malone posted a 134–92 record with 1,024 strikeouts and a 3.74 ERA in 357 appearances, including 220 starts, 115 complete games, 15 shutouts, 26 saves, and 1,915 innings pitched. "One can only wonder what he could have accomplished if he had not had such a love affair with the bottle and the nightlife", wrote baseball historian Frank Russo.

As a hitter, Malone recorded a .188 batting average (129 for 688) with nine home runs and 61 RBI. He is one of four pitchers in the modern era to hit at least one home run in his first five major league seasons, along with Claude Hendrix, Dontrelle Willis, and Travis Wood.

== Pitching style ==
Malone was not afraid to intimidate hitters, standing out among other pitchers with the amount of brushback pitches he threw. "Malone never had problems busting one inside, especially if he thought the batter was getting too comfortable up there. He'd throw one high and tight, and if you didn't move, he'd throw another one", recalled Cubs teammate and manager Charlie Grimm. Teammate Billy Jurges claimed, while all Chicago's pitchers during that era were tough, Malone was the toughest. Malone only hit 45 batters during his major league career, however, owing to his good control. Standing at 6 feet 0 inches (1.83 m) and 200 pounds (91 kg), Malone's build and hard fastball caused people to compare him to Vance. In 1929, the Associated Press wrote that Malone possessed "probably the fastest ball in the major leagues". He also threw a curveball.

== Personal ==
Malone quickly gained a reputation as a prankster upon reaching the major leagues. He enjoyed doling out hot feet, and towel-whipping unsuspecting teammates while they showered. During his rookie season, he caught some pigeons on a hotel ledge and put them in roommate Jones's bed while he slept. An irritated Jones promptly requested a new roommate.

In 1926, Malone married Marion Seeley. He credited her influence on his personal life with his improvement in 1926. The couple would have one daughter, Patricia. When Malone's teams were in the offseason, they lived in Marion's hometown of Milan, Ohio; Altoona, or Los Angeles. After Malone's career, he and his family returned to Altoona, where the pitcher opened up a tavern. Malone enjoyed golf, hunting, and fishing as hobbies.

On May 13, 1943, at his father's home in Hollidaysburg, Pennsylvania, Malone was attacked by severe abdominal pain. After consulting a local physician, he checked into Mercy Hospital in Altoona. At 11:45 that evening, he died from acute pancreatitis that had resulted from his hard-drinking lifestyle. He was 40 years old. His body was cremated in Pittsburgh, then delivered to Milan, where it was buried in the Milan Cemetery at Section HO, Lot 28, Grave 3.

== See also ==
- List of Major League Baseball annual wins leaders
- List of Major League Baseball annual strikeout leaders
- List of Major League Baseball annual shutout leaders
- List of Major League Baseball annual saves leaders
