= Sam Leslie =

American baseball player

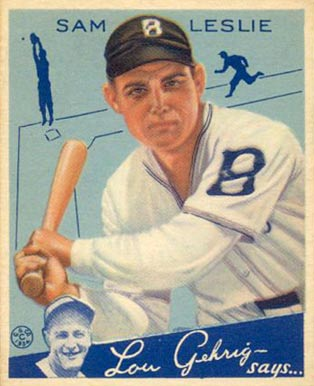
- First baseman
- Born: July 26, 1905; Moss Point, Mississippi, U.S.
- Died: January 21, 1979 (aged 73); Pascagoula, Mississippi, U.S.
- Batted: Left Threw: Left

MLB debut
- October 6, 1929, for the New York Giants

Last MLB appearance
- September 27, 1938, for the New York Giants

MLB statistics
- Batting average: .304
- Home runs: 36
- Runs batted in: 389
- Stats at Baseball Reference

Teams
- New York Giants (1929–1933); Brooklyn Dodgers (1933–1935); New York Giants (1936–1938)

Samuel Andrew Leslie (July 26, 1905 – January 21, 1979), nicknamed "Sambo", was an American first baseman for Major League Baseball's New York Giants and Brooklyn Dodgers from 1929 to 1938.

A left-hander, Leslie played ten years in the Major League as a first baseman, from his debut on October 6, 1929, until his final game on September 27, 1938. He first played for the New York Giants (1929–33), during the 1933 season was traded to the Brooklyn Dodgers (1933–35), and then sent back to the Giants (1936–38) where he finished out his career.

== Early life ==
Sam Leslie was born on July 26, 1905, to Darling Bodden Leslie and Mary Anna Hamilton in Moss Point, Mississippi. He was the oldest of three children having a younger sister named Thelma and brother named Cecil. He also had a half sister, Alpha, for whom they shared the same mother.

== Baseball career ==
Sam began his professional baseball career with the Memphis Chicks in 1927 and was the league's batting champion in 1929 with a .376 average. His Major League career began on October 6, 1929, when he joined the New York Giants, managed by Hall of Famer John McGraw. During his first years with the club, he was primarily used as a pinch hitter and reserve player having the misfortune of playing behind long time Giants first baseman and Hall of Famer Bill Terry.

During the 1932 season, Leslie gained recognition by establishing a single season Major League Baseball record by collecting 22 pinch hits. While the record was broken in 1961, it remains the Giants' franchise single season record to this day. He also ranks second on the team's all-time pinch hit list with 57, just one behind the team record. Leslie's breakout year came in 1933 when he batted .295 with 148 hits and 73 RBIs in 136 games while playing stints for both the Giants and the Brooklyn Dodgers.

In June 1933, Leslie was traded to the Brooklyn Dodgers in exchange for Lefty O'Doul and Watson Clark. He became the starting first baseman and continued to excel at the plate, batting .332 with 181 hits and 102 RBIs during the 1934 season with a rare inside the park grand slam on July 6. In 1935, he batted .308 with 160 hits and 93 RBIs.

In February 1936, Leslie returned to the New York Giants in exchange for cash and proceeded to split time at first base with player/manager Bill Terry. He was the only player to hit for the cycle in 1936 (on May 24) and was instrumental in the Giants winning the National League pennant in both the 1936 and 1937 seasons. The team, however, lost to their cross-town rivals, the New York Yankees, in the World Series both years, in six games and five games, respectively. During his final tenure with the Giants, Leslie batted .290 with 221 hits and 100 RBIs from 1936 to 1938.

Leslie retired from professional baseball after the 1938 season due to an injury and returned home to the Mississippi Gulf Coast to help raise his family. He closed out his Major League career with a lifetime .304 batting average including 749 hits in 2,460 at-bats, 389 RBIs, and 36 home runs in 822 games. Defensively, he recorded a .989 fielding percentage. During his 10 years in the Major Leagues, he had the fortune of playing with many of baseball's legends including Hall of Fame teammates Mel Ott, Carl Hubbell, Bill Terry, and Travis Jackson with the Giants, as well as Hack Wilson and Al López with the Dodgers. For his accomplishments on the field, Leslie was inducted into the Mississippi Sports Hall of Fame in 1968.

== Personal life ==
In 1927, Leslie married Etta Katherine Bosarge and had three children: Sam Jr., Dorothy Lou, and Carl. After retiring from baseball, he worked at Ingalls Shipbuilding in Pascagoula, Mississippi, for 26 years. He and Etta had 13 grandchildren. In his later years, he was instrumental in starting the summer youth baseball league in Pascagoula.

Leslie died on January 21, 1979, after a lengthy illness at the age of 73.

== See also ==
- List of Major League Baseball players to hit for the cycle

Achievements
Preceded by Joe Medwick	Hitting for the cycle May 24, 1936	Succeeded by Gee Walker
