= Bill Terry =

American baseball player and manager (1898-1989)

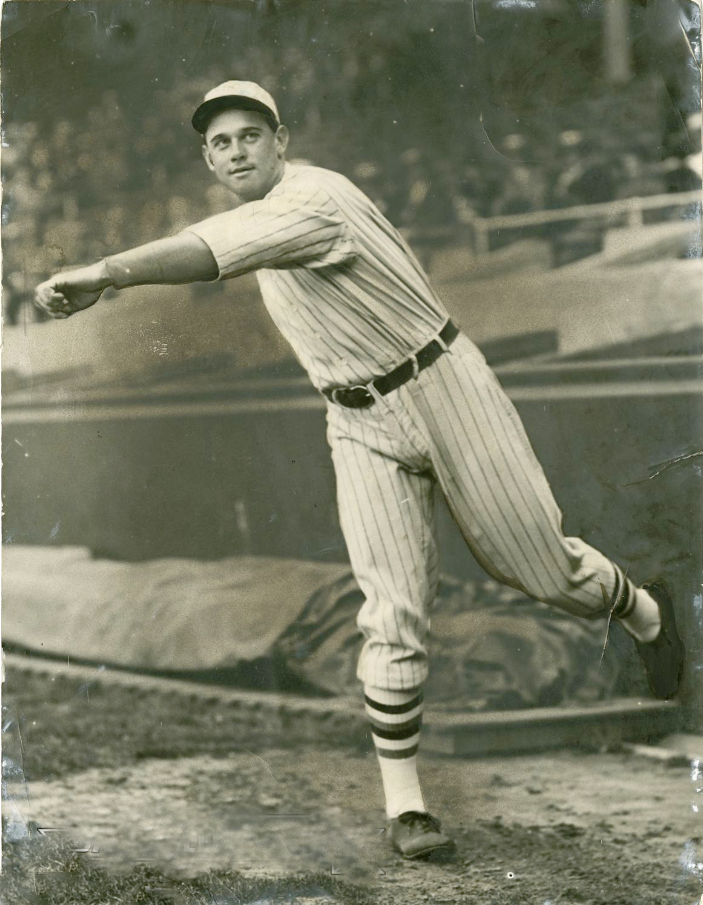
- Terry with the New York Giants, c. 1927
- First baseman / Manager
- Born: October 30, 1898; Atlanta, Georgia, U.S.
- Died: January 9, 1989 (aged 90); Jacksonville, Florida, U.S.
- Batted: Left Threw: Left

MLB debut
- September 24, 1923, for the New York Giants

Last MLB appearance
- September 22, 1936, for the New York Giants

MLB statistics
- Batting average: .341
- Hits: 2,193
- Home runs: 154
- Runs batted in: 1,078
- Managerial record: 823–661
- Winning %: .555
- Stats at Baseball Reference
- Managerial record at Baseball Reference

Teams
- As player: New York Giants (1923–1936); As manager: New York Giants (1932–1941)

Career highlights and awards
- 3× All-Star (1933–1935); World Series champion (1933); NL batting champion (1930); San Francisco Giants No. 3 retired

Member of the National

Baseball Hall of Fame
- Induction: 1954
- Vote: 77.4% (14th ballot)

William Harold Terry (October 30, 1898 – January 9, 1989) was an American professional baseball first baseman and manager. He played in Major League Baseball (MLB) for the New York Giants from 1923 to 1936 and managed the Giants from 1932 to 1941. Terry was inducted into the Baseball Hall of Fame in 1954. In 1999, he ranked number 59 on The Sporting News list of the 100 Greatest Baseball Players, and was a nominee for the Major League Baseball All-Century Team. The Giants retired Terry's uniform number 3 in 1984; it is posted on the facade of the upper deck in the left field corner of Oracle Park. Nicknamed "Memphis Bill", he is most remembered for being the last National League player to hit .400, a feat he accomplished by batting .401 in 1930.

== Playing career ==
=== Early years ===
Born in Atlanta, Terry made his professional baseball debut in 1915 at the age of 16. He began his career as a pitcher, playing for two separate minor league teams, the Newnan Cowetas of the Georgia–Alabama League and the Dothan, Alabama based Dothan club of the FLAG League. With Newnan, he had a win–loss record of 7–1, with an 0.60 earned run average in eight games.

After starting 1916 with Newnan, by the end of the year he had moved up to the class-B Shreveport Gassers of the Texas League. He again compiled impressive statistics for his new team, putting up a record of 6–2 with a 1.07 earned run average in 11 games with Shreveport. Terry spent all of 1917 with Shreveport, with a record of 14–11 and an earned run average of 3.00. By this time, he was also beginning to play more in the field, pitching in 40 games and appearing in 55 other games.

After spending several years playing semi-professionally, Terry was picked up by the Toledo Mud Hens of the American Association in 1922. He was now playing in double-A, the highest minor league level at that time. While he was still pitching, putting up a 9–9 record in 26 games, his hitting was also starting to pick up. In 88 games with Toledo, Terry batted .336 with 14 home runs.

In 1923, Terry had been converted into a full-time first baseman. In 109 games with Toledo that year, Terry batted .377 with 15 home runs. This gained the notice of the major league New York Giants, and on September 18 they purchased his contract from the Mud Hens. In an interesting coincidence, Freddie Lindstrom, another future Hall of Fame player, was also purchased by the Giants from the Mud Hens on the same day.

=== Starting out in the majors ===
Terry made his major league debut with the Giants on September 24, 1923 in a game against the Cincinnati Reds. In that game, he pinch-hit for Giants pitcher Rosy Ryan, going 0-for-1. Terry did not play again until September 30, when he made his first appearance in the starting lineup against the Boston Braves. Terry got his first major league hit in that game, going 1-for-3 and scoring his first major league run. Terry finished the season with one hit in seven at bats in three games.

Terry played all of 1924 with the Giants, backing up fellow future Hall of Famer George Kelly at first base for the pennant-winning team. Terry played in 77 games, 35 at first base and the rest as a pinch-hitter. He batted .239 with 5 home runs and 24 runs batted in. In the World Series against the Washington Senators, he batted .429, including a Game 1 home run off Walter Johnson.

=== Into and out of the starting lineup ===
In 1925, Giants starting third baseman Heinie Groh suffered an injury early in the season, forcing the team to juggle its lineup a bit. Starting second baseman Frankie Frisch was tried at third but wound up spending most of the season shifting around the infield when Lindstrom was made the starter. Kelly was moved from first base to second, and Terry was installed as the starting first baseman. He hit .319 in 133 games, with 11 homers and 70 runs batted in.

In 1926, with Lindstrom established as the starter at third, Frisch was reinstated at second and Kelly moved back to first, sending Terry back into a reserve role. In addition to backing up Kelly, Terry played in 14 games in the outfield. This was the only season in which he played more than one game at a position other than first base. Overall, Terry played 98 games, batting .289 with 5 home runs and 43 runs batted in.

=== 1927: Breakout year ===
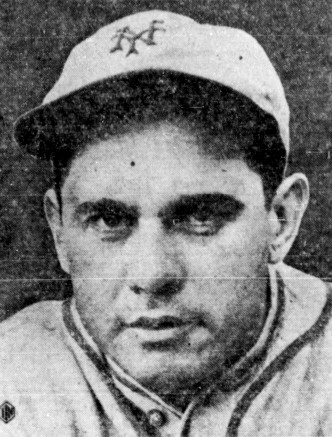
Terry in 1933

During the following offseason, the Giants made some major changes to their starting lineup. On December 20, 1926, they traded Frisch and pitcher Jimmy Ring to the St. Louis Cardinals for Rogers Hornsby. Then, on February 9, they traded Kelly to the Reds for outfielder Edd Roush, opening a spot once more for Terry in the starting lineup. Terry batted .326 in 1927, with 20 home runs and 121 runs batted in. He finished 13th in the voting for the Major League Baseball Most Valuable Player Award, and his days of being a backup were behind him for good.

=== History in the making ===
Over the next two seasons, Terry continued to produce for the Giants, batting .326 again in 1928 with 101 runs batted in, and then .372 in 1929 with 117 runs batted in. In both years, he finished in the top ten in the National League in a number of statistical categories and in 1929 he finished third in the Most Valuable Player Award voting. This led to what is generally considered Terry's best season ever, 1930.

In 1930, Terry had an historic season. He finished first in the National League with a .401 batting average, the first player to hit over .400 since Rogers Hornsby in 1925. It is also the last time to date that anyone in the National League has hit .400. Only Ted Williams of the American League's Boston Red Sox in 1941 has hit .400 since. Terry also led the league with 254 hits, which is tied for the most in NL history with the Phillies' Lefty O'Doul's 254 in 1929. He also finished 5th in the league in on-base percentage (.452), 7th in slugging percentage (.619), 6th in runs scored with 139 runs, and led the league in putouts and assists by a first baseman. While there was no official league most valuable player award in 1930, Terry won The Sporting News Most Valuable Player Award.

=== Player-manager ===
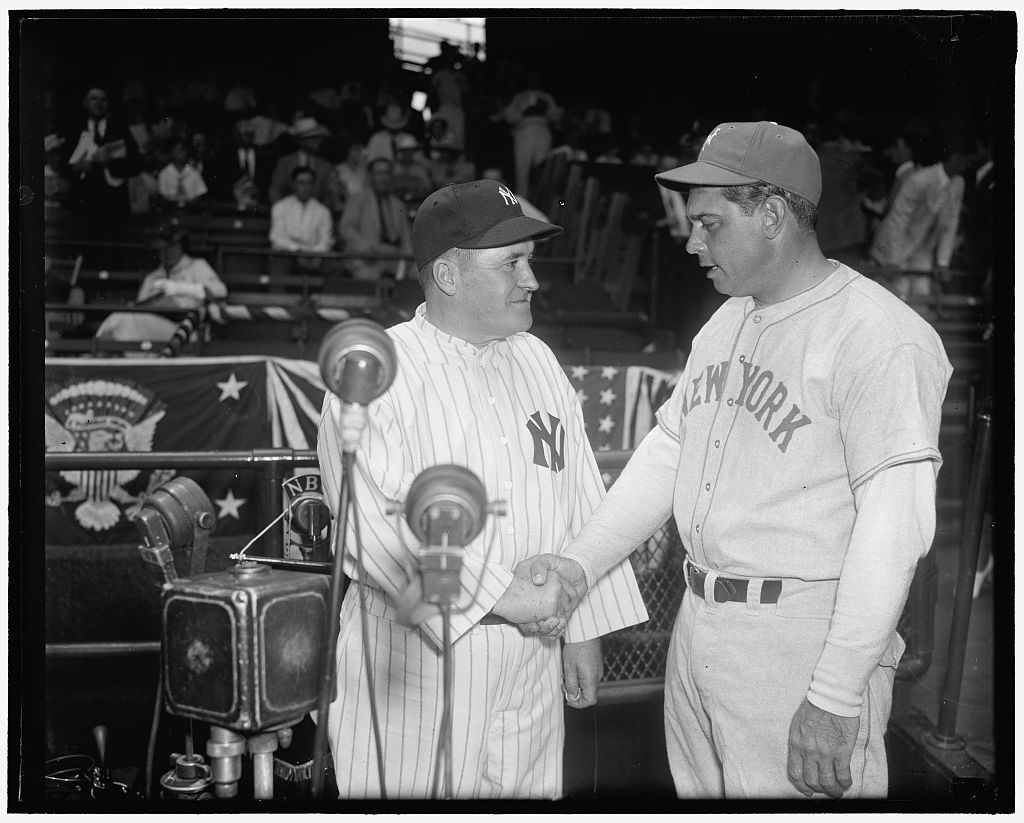
Terry (right) with Joe McCarthy at the 1937 All-Star Game.

While Terry never again reached the lofty heights of 1930, he had another excellent season in 1931. He led the league in runs scored with 121 and in triples with 20 while batting .349 with 112 runs batted in, and he finished third in the new Baseball Writers' Association of America National League Most Valuable Player Award voting. He became the only Giants player (as of 2014) to hit two doubles and two triples in a game when he did so against the Cincinnati Reds on September 13, 1931. In 1932, Terry set his career high in home runs with 28, batting .350 with 117 runs batted in. He was also named the team's manager in early June, replacing the legendary John McGraw. He hit three home runs in a game in a losing effort against the Brooklyn Dodgers. The team finished in sixth place, going 55–59 under Terry.

=== 1933: World Series championship ===
In 1933, Terry's first full season as manager, the team won the National League pennant and the World Series. Although, as a player, Terry missed a month early in the season with an injury, he still hit .322. It was also the first season of the All-Star Game, for which Terry was chosen as a starter and in which he got two hits. The Giants once again faced the Senators in the 1933 World Series, which they won four games to one. Terry went 6-for-22, hitting a home run in Game 4 off Monte Weaver. Despite an off-year, Terry still finished fourth in the MVP voting, perhaps gaining votes for managing the team to the championship, the Giants' first since 1922, the year before Terry's MLB debut.

=== Career winding down ===
In 1934 Terry came back to put up big numbers once more, finishing second in the NL in batting at .354 and in hits with 213 while finishing seventh in the Most Valuable Player Award voting. Terry managed the team to a seven-game lead in the National League on September 6, but the Giants lost 13 of their final 21 games and fell to second place at season's end, just two games behind the pennant-winning St. Louis Cardinals "Gashouse Gang". In 1935, Terry again got over 200 hits with 203, and batted .341 while finishing sixth in the Most Valuable Player Award voting, and managed the team to a third-place finish. In both years he was again selected to start in the All-Star game. As manager, Terry became an advocate of platooning, as Hank Leiber and Jimmy Ripple split playing time in center field.

1936 was Terry's last year as a player. Before the season started, the team had purchased Sam Leslie from the Brooklyn Dodgers. Terry split time at first base with Leslie, with the newcomer getting the lion's share. It worked out well for the team, as they again won the pennant, beating the Cardinals by five games. In the World Series, Terry started all six games, but batted just .240 with no extra base hits. He had five runs batted in, but that was not enough, as the Giants lost to the New York Yankees, four games to two.

== Remaining managerial career ==
Terry retired as a player after the 1936 season, but continued to manage the Giants until 1941. He also held the title of general manager of the Giants from September 7, 1937, through the end of the 1942 season. The Giants won another pennant in 1937, but they lost another World Series to the New York Yankees, four games to one. The team finished third in 1938, but never again finished in the first division under Terry, finishing fifth, sixth, and fifth in his last three years as manager. Terry resigned as manager after the 1941 season and named Mel Ott, his teammate since 1926, as his successor.

=== Managerial record ===
Team	Year	Regular season					Postseason			
Team	Year	Games	Won	Lost	Win %	Finish	Won	Lost	Win %	Result
NYG	1932	114	55	59	.482	6th in NL	–	–	–	–
NYG	1933	156	91	61	.599	1st in NL	4	1	.800	Won World Series (WAS)
NYG	1934	153	93	60	.608	2nd in NL	–	–	–	–
NYG	1935	156	91	62	.595	3rd in NL	–	–	–	–
NYG	1936	154	92	62	.597	1st in NL	2	4	.333	Lost World Series (NYY)
NYG	1937	152	95	57	.625	1st in NL	1	4	.200	Lost World Series (NYY)
NYG	1938	152	83	67	.553	2nd in NL	–	–	–	–
NYG	1939	151	77	74	.510	5th in NL	–	–	–	–
NYG	1940	152	72	80	.474	6th in NL	–	–	–	–
NYG	1941	156	74	79	.463	5th in NL	–	–	–	–
NYG total		1,496	823	661	.555		7	9	.438	
Total		1,496	823	661	.555		7	9	.438	

== Ownership career ==
After retiring from playing and managing, Terry settled in Jacksonville, Florida, where he owned a successful Buick automobile dealership and purchased the Jacksonville Braves double-A team in 1958.

== Career summary ==
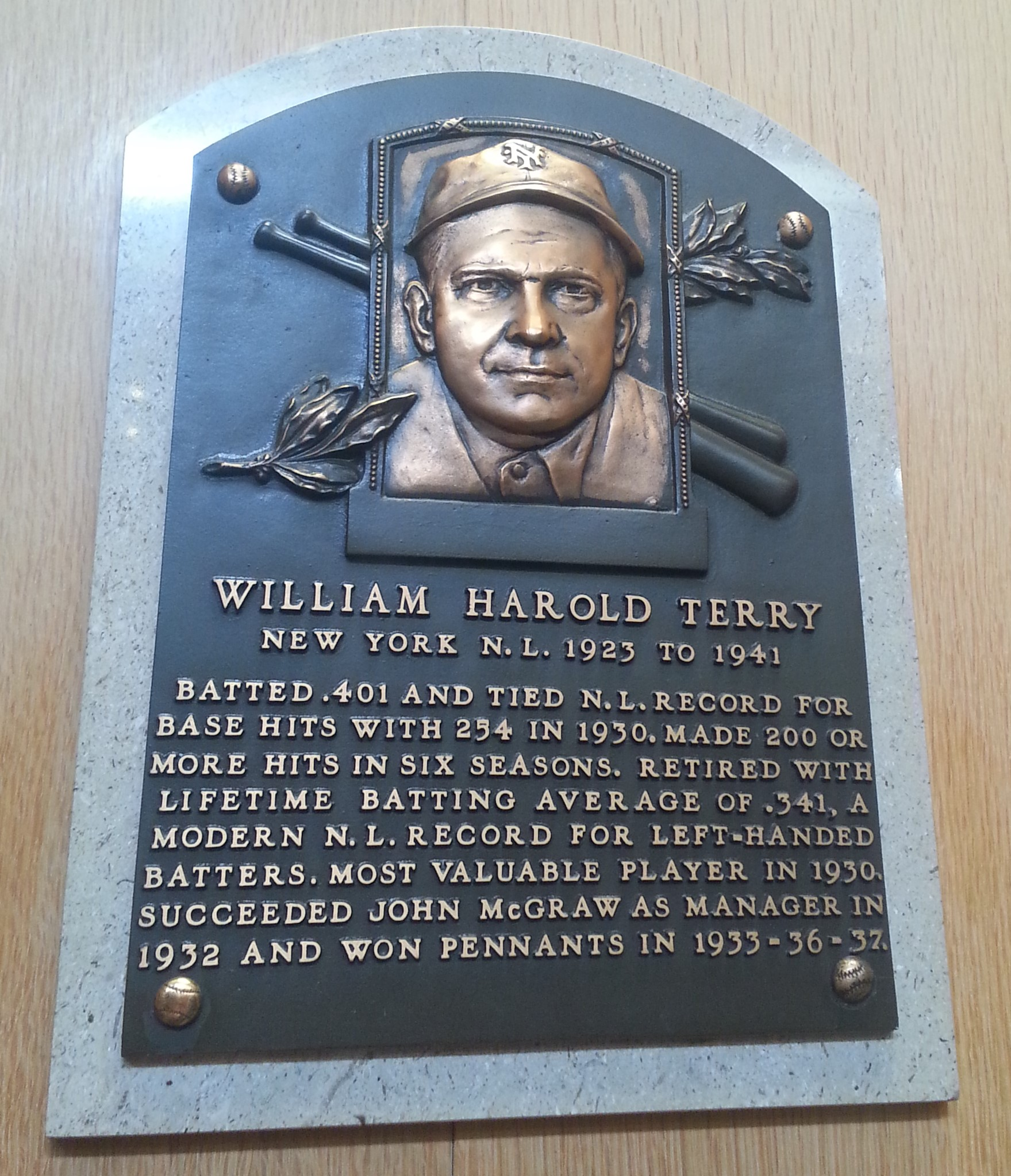
Plaque of Bill Terry at the Baseball Hall of Fame

Over his 14-year career, Terry posted seven seasons with 100 or more runs, six seasons with 100 or more runs batted in, six seasons with at least 200 hits, and nine consecutive seasons batting .320 or higher, from 1927 through 1935; additionally he posted three seasons with at least 20 home runs, including a career high of 28 in 1932. Terry retired with 1120 runs scored, 154 home runs, 1078 runs batted in and a .341 batting average. He also currently holds the record for the highest career batting average for a left-handed hitter in the National League at .341. Terry was also one of the best fielding first baseman of his era, compiling a career .992 fielding percentage.

Terry accumulated 7 five-hit games and 40 four-hit games in his MLB career.

As a manager, he led the Giants to three National League pennants and a world championship. In nine full seasons as a manager, he only had a losing season twice while finishing in the top three of the League six times. No Giants manager would lead them to three league pennants until Bruce Bochy did so nearly seventy years later.

== Baseball honors ==
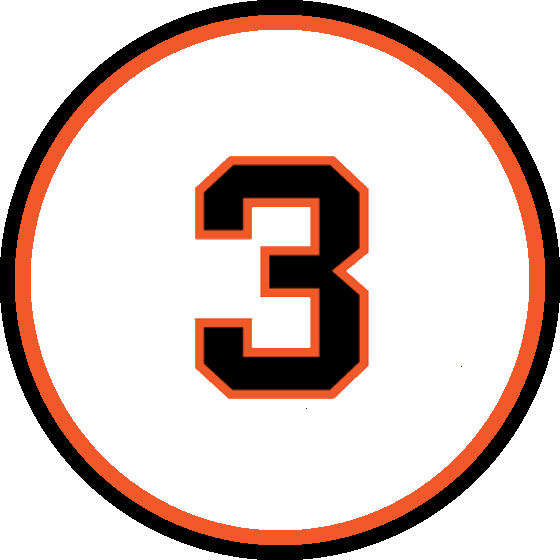
Bill Terry's number 3 was retired by the San Francisco Giants in 1984.

Terry was inducted into the Baseball Hall of Fame in 1954. In 1999, he ranked number 59 on The Sporting News' list of the 100 Greatest Baseball Players, and was a nominee for the Major League Baseball All-Century Team. The Giants retired Terry's uniform no. 3 in 1984; it is posted on the facade of the upper deck in the left field corner of Oracle Park.

Bill Terry is mentioned in the 1949 poem "Line-Up for Yesterday" by Ogden Nash:

Line-Up for Yesterday

T is for Terry
The Giant from Memphis
Whose .400 average
You can't overemphis.

— Ogden Nash, Sport magazine (January 1949)

== See also ==
- List of Major League Baseball career hits leaders
- List of Major League Baseball career triples leaders
- List of Major League Baseball career runs scored leaders
- List of Major League Baseball career runs batted in leaders
- List of Major League Baseball players to hit for the cycle
- List of Major League Baseball batting champions
- List of Major League Baseball annual runs scored leaders
- List of Major League Baseball annual triples leaders
- List of Major League Baseball player-managers
- List of Major League Baseball players who spent their entire career with one franchise

Sporting positions
Preceded by Cy Williams	Hitting for the cycle May 29, 1928	Succeeded by Bob Meusel
