= 1935 Major League Baseball All-Star Game =

1935 American baseball competition

	1	2	3	4	5	6	7	8	9	R	H	E
National League	0	0	0	1	0	0	0	0	0	1	4	1
American League	2	1	0	0	1	0	0	0	X	4	8	0
- Date: July 8, 1935
- Venue: Cleveland Stadium
- City: Cleveland, Ohio
- Managers: Frankie Frisch (STL); Mickey Cochrane (DET)
- Attendance: 69,812
- Radio: CBS; NBC; Mutual
- Radio announcers: Jack Graney and France Laux (CBS); Tom Manning and Graham McNamee (NBC); Bob Elson and Ellis VanderPyl (Mutual)

The 1935 Major League Baseball All-Star Game was the third playing of the mid-summer classic between the all-stars of the American League (AL) and National League (NL), the two leagues comprising Major League Baseball. The game was held on July 8, 1935, at Cleveland Stadium in Cleveland, Ohio, hosted by the Cleveland Indians of the American League. The game resulted in the American League defeating the National League 4–1.

== Rosters ==
Players in italics have since been inducted into the National Baseball Hall of Fame.

=== National League ===
Starters
Position	Player	Team	All-Star Games
P	Bill Walker	Cardinals	1
C	Jimmie Wilson	Phillies	2
1B	Bill Terry	Giants	3
2B	Billy Herman	Cubs	2
3B	Pepper Martin	Cardinals	3
SS	Arky Vaughan	Pirates	2
LF	Joe Medwick	Cardinals	2
CF	Wally Berger	Braves	3
RF	Mel Ott	Giants	2

Pitchers
Position	Player	Team	All-Star Games
P	Dizzy Dean	Cardinals	2
P	Paul Derringer	Reds	1
P	Carl Hubbell	Giants	3
P	Hal Schumacher	Giants	2
P	Van Mungo	Dodgers	2

Reserves
Position	Player	Team	All-Star Games
C	Gabby Hartnett	Cubs	3
C	Gus Mancuso	Giants	1
1B	Ripper Collins	Cardinals	1
2B	Frankie Frisch	Cardinals	3
2B	Burgess Whitehead	Cardinals	1
OF	Jo-Jo Moore	Giants	2
OF	Paul Waner	Pirates	3

=== American League ===
Starters
Position	Player	Team	All-Star Games
P	Lefty Gomez	Yankees	3
C	Rollie Hemsley	Browns	1
1B	Lou Gehrig	Yankees	3
2B	Charlie Gehringer	Tigers	3
3B	Jimmie Foxx	Athletics	3
SS	Joe Cronin	Red Sox	3
LF	Bob Johnson	Athletics	1
CF	Al Simmons	White Sox	3
RF	Joe Vosmik	Indians	1

Pitchers
Position	Player	Team	All-Star Games
P	Tommy Bridges	Tigers	2
P	Lefty Grove	Red Sox	2
P	Mel Harder	Indians	2
P	Schoolboy Rowe	Tigers	1

Reserves
Position	Player	Team	All-Star Games
C	Mickey Cochrane	Tigers	2
C	Rick Ferrell	Red Sox	3
2B	Buddy Myer	Senators	1
SS	Ossie Bluege	Senators	1
OF	Earl Averill	Indians	3
OF	Ben Chapman	Yankees	3
OF	Doc Cramer	Athletics	1
OF	Sam West	Browns	3

== Game ==
=== Umpires ===
Position	Umpire	League
Home Plate	Red Ormsby	American
First Base	George Magerkurth	National
Second Base	Harry Geisel	American
Third Base	Ziggy Sears	National

The umpires rotated positions clockwise in the middle of the fifth inning, with Magerkurth moving behind the plate.

=== Starting lineups ===
National League				American League			
Order	Player	Team	Position	Order	Player	Team	Position
1	Pepper Martin	Cardinals	3B	1	Joe Vosmik	Indians	RF
2	Arky Vaughan	Pirates	SS	2	Charlie Gehringer	Tigers	2B
3	Mel Ott	Giants	RF	3	Lou Gehrig	Yankees	1B
4	Joe Medwick	Cardinals	LF	4	Jimmie Foxx	Athletics	3B
5	Bill Terry	Giants	1B	5	Bob Johnson	Athletics	LF
6	Wally Berger	Braves	CF	6	Al Simmons	White Sox	CF
7	Billy Herman	Cubs	2B	7	Rollie Hemsley	Browns	C
8	Jimmie Wilson	Phillies	C	8	Joe Cronin	Senators	SS
9	Bill Walker	Cardinals	P	9	Lefty Gomez	Yankees	P

=== Game summary ===
Monday, July 8, 1935 1:30 pm (ET) at Cleveland Stadium in Cleveland, Ohio
Team	1	2	3	4	5	6	7	8	9	R	H	E
National League	0	0	0	1	0	0	0	0	0	1	4	1
American League	2	1	0	0	1	0	0	0	-	4	8	0
WP: Lefty Gomez (1–0) LP: Bill Walker (0–1) Sv: Mel Harder (1); Home runs: NL: None; AL: Jimmie Foxx (1)

Lefty Gomez of the Yankees pitches six innings, gives up three hits and is the winning pitcher. Jimmie Foxx drives in three with a two-run homer and a single. Bill Walker is the losing pitcher.
