= 1937 World Series =

1937 Major League Baseball championship series

Team (Wins)	Managers	Season
New York Yankees (4)	Joe McCarthy	102–52, .662, GA: 13
New York Giants (1)	Bill Terry	95–57, .625, GA: 3
- Dates: October 6–10
- Venue(s): Yankee Stadium (New York Yankees); Polo Grounds (New York Giants)
- Umpires: Red Ormsby (AL), George Barr (NL); Steve Basil (AL), Bill Stewart (NL)
- Hall of Famers: Yankees: Joe McCarthy (mgr.); Bill Dickey; Joe DiMaggio; Lou Gehrig; Lefty Gomez; Tony Lazzeri; Red Ruffing; Giants: Carl Hubbell; Travis Jackson; Mel Ott; Bill Terry‡ (mgr.) ‡ Elected as a player

Broadcast
- Radio: NBC; CBS; Mutual
- Radio announcers: NBC: Tom Manning; Red Barber; Warren Brown; George Hicks; CBS: France Laux; Bill Dyer; Paul Douglas; Mutual: Bob Elson; Johnny O'Hara; David Driscoll

The 1937 World Series was the championship series in Major League Baseball for the 1937 season. The 34th edition of the World Series, it featured the defending champion New York Yankees and the New York Giants in a rematch of the 1936 Series. The Yankees won in five games, for their second championship in a row and their sixth in 15 years (1923, 1927–28, 1932, 1936).

This was the Yankees' third Series win over the Giants (1923, 1936), finally giving them an overall edge in Series wins over the Giants with three Fall Classic wins to the Giants' two (after they lost the 1921 and 1922 Series to the Giants). Currently, the St. Louis Cardinals are the only "Classic Eight" National League (1900–1961) team to hold a Series edge over the Bronx Bombers, with three wins to the Yankees' two. The 1937 victory by the Yankees also broke a three-way tie among themselves, the Philadelphia Athletics and the Boston Red Sox for the most World Series wins all-time (five each). By the time the Athletics and Red Sox each won their sixth World Series (in 1972 and 2004, respectively), the Yankees had far outpaced both teams in world championships with 20 in 1972 and 26 in 2004.

The 1937 Series was the first in which a team (in this case, the Yankees) did not commit a single error, handling 179 total chances (132 putouts, 47 assists) perfectly. Game 4 ended with the final World Series innings ever pitched by Hall of Famer Carl Hubbell, who during the ninth inning gave up Hall of Famer Lou Gehrig's final Series home run.

== Summary ==
AL New York Yankees (4) vs. NL New York Giants (1)

Game	Date	Score	Location	Time	Attendance
1	October 6	New York Giants – 1, New York Yankees – 8	Yankee Stadium	2:20	60,573
2	October 7	New York Giants – 1, New York Yankees – 8	Yankee Stadium	2:11	57,675
3	October 8	New York Yankees – 5, New York Giants – 1	Polo Grounds	2:07	37,385
4	October 9	New York Yankees – 3, New York Giants – 7	Polo Grounds	1:57	44,293
5	October 10	New York Yankees – 4, New York Giants – 2	Polo Grounds	2:06	38,216

== Matchups ==
=== Game 1 ===
Wednesday, October 6, 1937 1:30 pm (ET) at Yankee Stadium in Bronx, New York
Team	1	2	3	4	5	6	7	8	9	R	H	E
New York (NL)	0	0	0	0	1	0	0	0	0	1	6	2
New York (AL)	0	0	0	0	0	7	0	1	X	8	7	0
WP: Lefty Gomez (1–0) LP: Carl Hubbell (0–1); Home runs: NYG: None; NYY: Tony Lazzeri (1)

The Series opener was a battle of aces, as the Giants sent their "Mealticket", screwballer Carl Hubbell, who had won 22 games during the season, to the mound against the Bombers' Lefty Gomez, who had won 21. Hubbell and Gomez matched zeroes until the top of the fifth inning, when Jimmy Ripple singled, moved to third on another single by Johnny McCarthy, and scored the only Giant run of the game when Gus Mancuso hit into a double play.

Hubbell kept the Yankees at bay in the bottom half of the inning, but the wheels came off for him in the sixth. A walk and two singles loaded the bases with one out before Joe DiMaggio's two-run single put the Yankees up 2–1. An intentional walk reloaded the bases before Bill Dickey's RBI single increased the lead to 3–1, then George Selkirk's two-run single following a force out at home chased King Carl. An error on Tony Lazzeri's ground ball made it 6–1 Yankees, then Giant pitcher Dick Coffman issued two walks, including one to Red Rolfe that forced in a run before DiMaggio flew out to end the inning. Tony Lazzeri added a home run in the eighth inning off Al Smith, while Gomez stymied the Giants, holding them to one run and six hits in a complete game, 8–1 victory for a 1–0 Yankee lead in the Series.

=== Game 2 ===
Thursday, October 7, 1937 1:30 pm (ET) at Yankee Stadium in Bronx, New York
Team	1	2	3	4	5	6	7	8	9	R	H	E
New York (NL)	1	0	0	0	0	0	0	0	0	1	7	0
New York (AL)	0	0	0	0	2	4	2	0	X	8	12	0
WP: Red Ruffing (1–0) LP: Cliff Melton (0–1)

For Game 2, the Yankees started veteran Red Ruffing against Giant rookie Cliff Melton. Ruffing would give Melton a rude welcome to postseason play with both his arm and his bat.

The Giants touched Ruffing for a run in the first, as Dick Bartell doubled and Mel Ott drove him in with a single with one out. This did not faze Ruffing, who whiffed the next three batters to end the inning. As in Game 1, this would be the only Giant run of the day. Melton was able to neutralize the potent Bombers for the next four innings, giving up only two hits and striking out two. In the fifth, however, the Yankees chased the youngster from the game when they took a 2–1 lead on a leadoff double by Myril Hoag, then RBI singles by George Selkirk and Ruffing.

Just as in Game 1, the pinstripers opened up the game in the sixth, when Selkirk and Ruffing came through again, this time with two-run doubles after two leadoff singles off Harry Gumbert. In the seventh, the Yankees tacked on two more runs off Dick Coffman with leadoff single and walk, followed by a Bill Dickey single that scored Joe DiMaggio and a fly ball by Myril Hoag that plated Lou Gehrig. Ruffing held the fort the rest of the way, scattering seven hits with one run and eight strikeouts. For the second straight game the Yankees won 8–1, for a 2–0 Series lead as the teams moved a few miles south to the Polo Grounds.

=== Game 3 ===
Friday, October 8, 1937 1:30 pm (ET) at Polo Grounds in Manhattan, New York
Team	1	2	3	4	5	6	7	8	9	R	H	E
New York (AL)	0	1	2	1	1	0	0	0	0	5	9	0
New York (NL)	0	0	0	0	0	0	1	0	0	1	5	4
WP: Monte Pearson (1–0) LP: Hal Schumacher (0–1) Sv: Johnny Murphy (1)

The Yankees struck first in Game 3 on Tony Lazzeri's RBI single with two on in the second off Hal Schumacher. Next inning, Lou Gehrig hit a one out single, and scored on a triple by Bill Dickey, who then scored on a single by George Selkirk. Gehrig added a sacrifice fly next inning with runners on first and third. The Yankees got one more run in the fifth when Selkirk reached second on an error and scored on Myril Hoag's single. The Giants scored their only run in the seventh when Jimmy Ripple singled with one out and scored on Johnny McCarthy's double. Monte Pearson needed last-out help from Johnny Murphy after loading the bases in the bottom of the ninth, inducing Harry Danning, the tying run at the plate, to fly out to centerfield. The Yankees now had a 3–0 lead in the series.

=== Game 4 ===
Saturday, October 9, 1937 1:30 pm (ET) at Polo Grounds in Manhattan, New York
Team	1	2	3	4	5	6	7	8	9	R	H	E
New York (AL)	1	0	1	0	0	0	0	0	1	3	6	0
New York (NL)	0	6	0	0	0	0	1	0	X	7	12	3
WP: Carl Hubbell (1–1) LP: Bump Hadley (0–1); Home runs: NYY: Lou Gehrig (1); NYG: None

This is the second time in World Series history that a team that has lost the first three games has won a World Series game. This was Carl Hubbell's last World Series appearance. Hubbell allowed only six hits and walked one. Everyone in the NY Giants lineup except Hubbell hit safely. The Yankees scored the game's first run in the first when Red Rolfe hit a leadoff triple and scored on Joe DiMaggio's sacrifice fly, but in the bottom of the second, three consecutive leadoff singles tied the game. Carl Hubbell's fielder's choice and Jo-Jo Moore's single scored a run each. Ivy Andrews relieved Bump Hadley and allowed an RBI single to Dick Bartell. A two-out walk loaded the bases before Hank Leiber's two-run single capped the inning's scoring. The Yankees scored a run in the third without a hit aided by three errors. The Giants added a run in the seventh on Harry Danning's RBI double with two on. Lou Gehrig homered in the ninth for the Yankees, who could get nothing else as the Giants' 7–3 win forced a Game 5.

=== Game 5 ===
Sunday, October 10, 1937 2:00 pm (ET) at Polo Grounds in Manhattan, New York
Team	1	2	3	4	5	6	7	8	9	R	H	E
New York (AL)	0	1	1	0	2	0	0	0	0	4	8	0
New York (NL)	0	0	2	0	0	0	0	0	0	2	10	0
WP: Lefty Gomez (2–0) LP: Cliff Melton (0–2); Home runs: NYY: Myril Hoag (1), Joe DiMaggio (1); NYG: Mel Ott (1)

Myril Hoag's home run leading off the second inning and a Joe DiMaggio blast in the third gave Lefty Gomez a 2–0 lead. Mel Ott's two-run home run in the bottom of the third tied it. The Yankees got the game-winning (and Series-winning) runs they needed in the fifth on a Tony Lazzeri triple, an RBI single by Gomez and an RBI double by Lou Gehrig.

== Composite line score ==
1937 World Series (4–1): New York Yankees (A.L.) over New York Giants (N.L.)

Team	1	2	3	4	5	6	7	8	9	R	H	E
New York Yankees	1	2	4	1	5	11	2	1	1	28	42	0
New York Giants	1	6	2	0	1	0	2	0	0	12	40	9
Total attendance: 238,142 Average attendance: 47,628; Winning player's share: $6,471 Losing player's share: $4,490

== See also ==
- Subway Series / Giants–Yankees rivalry
