= 1936 World Series =

1936 Major League Baseball championship series

Team (Wins)	Managers	Season
New York Yankees (4)	Joe McCarthy	102–51, .667, GA: 19 1/2
New York Giants (2)	Bill Terry (player/manager)	92–62, .597, GA: 5
- Dates: September 30 – October 6
- Venue(s): Polo Grounds (New York Giants); Yankee Stadium (New York Yankees)
- Umpires: Cy Pfirman (NL), Harry Geisel (AL), George Magerkurth (NL), Bill Summers (AL)
- Hall of Famers: Yankees: Joe McCarthy (mgr.); Bill Dickey; Joe DiMaggio; Lou Gehrig; Lefty Gomez; Tony Lazzeri; Red Ruffing; Giants: Carl Hubbell; Travis Jackson; Mel Ott; Bill Terry

Broadcast
- Radio: NBC; CBS; Mutual
- Radio announcers: NBC: Tom Manning; Ty Tyson; Red Barber; Warren Brown; CBS: France Laux; Bill Dyer; Boake Carter; Mutual: Bob Elson; Tony Wakeman; Gabriel Heatter

World Series program

The 1936 World Series was the championship series in Major League Baseball for the 1936 season. The 33rd edition of the World Series, it matched the New York Yankees against the New York Giants, with the Yankees winning in six games to earn their fifth championship.

The Yankees played their first World Series without Babe Ruth and their first with Joe DiMaggio, Ruth having been released by the Yankees after the 1934 season. He retired in 1935 as a member of the Boston Braves.

== Summary ==
AL New York Yankees (4) vs. NL New York Giants (2)

Game	Date	Score	Location	Time	Attendance
1	September 30	New York Yankees – 1, New York Giants – 6	Polo Grounds	2:40	39,419
2	October 2†	New York Yankees – 18, New York Giants – 4	Polo Grounds	2:49	43,543
3	October 3	New York Giants – 1, New York Yankees – 2	Yankee Stadium	2:01	64,842
4	October 4	New York Giants – 2, New York Yankees – 5	Yankee Stadium	2:12	66,669
5	October 5	New York Giants – 5, New York Yankees – 4 (10)	Yankee Stadium	2:45	50,024
6	October 6	New York Yankees – 13, New York Giants – 5	Polo Grounds	2:50	38,427

== Matchups ==
=== Game 1 ===
Wednesday, September 30, 1936 1:30 pm (ET) at Polo Grounds in Manhattan, New York
Team	1	2	3	4	5	6	7	8	9	R	H	E
New York (AL)	0	0	1	0	0	0	0	0	0	1	7	2
New York (NL)	0	0	0	0	1	1	0	4	X	6	9	1
WP: Carl Hubbell (1–0) LP: Red Ruffing (0–1); Home runs: NYY: George Selkirk (1); NYG: Dick Bartell (1)

Carl Hubbell won Game 1, allowing only one run on George Selkirk's home run and seven hits. After Dick Bartell's fifth inning home run off Red Ruffing tied the game, an RBI single by Gus Mancuso scoring Mel Ott, who doubled to lead off, in the sixth inning put the Giants up 2–1. They padded their lead in the eighth inning. Two singles and a walk loaded the bases before a walk to Burgess Whitehead and sacrifice fly by Travis Jackson scored a run each. Hubbell's two-run single capped the game's scoring. He pitched a perfect ninth as the Giants took a 1–0 series lead.

=== Game 2 ===
Friday, October 2, 1936 1:30 pm (ET) at Polo Grounds in Manhattan, New York
Team	1	2	3	4	5	6	7	8	9	R	H	E
New York (AL)	2	0	7	0	0	1	2	0	6	18	17	0
New York (NL)	0	1	0	3	0	0	0	0	0	4	6	1
WP: Lefty Gomez (1–0) LP: Hal Schumacher (0–1); Home runs: NYY: Tony Lazzeri (1), Bill Dickey (1); NYG: None

The Yankees won Game 2 at the Polo Grounds by an 18–4 count, setting Series records for the biggest margin of victory in a World Series game (14 runs) and the most runs scored in one game with 18. They loaded the bases with no outs in the first off Hal Schumacher on two singles and a walk before sacrifice flies by Lou Gehrig and Bill Dickey put them up 2–0. Two walks and a wild pitch by Lefty Gomez in the second inning allowed the Giants to cut the lead to 2–1, but the Yankees blew the game open in the third inning. A single, walk and error loaded the bases with no outs. Al Smith relieved Schumacher and allowed a two-run single to Gehrig and RBI single to Dickey. A one-out walk reloaded the bases before Tony Lazzeri's grand slam off Dick Coffman made it 9–1 Yankees. The Giants scored their last three runs in the fourth inning on a bases loaded walk to Dick Bartell followed by a two-run single by Bill Terry. The Yankees added a run in the sixth on Joe DiMaggio's sacrifice fly with two on off Frank Gabler, then loaded the bases in the seventh on a walk and two singles before Lazzeri's flyout and Gomez's groundout scored a run each. In the ninth, Jake Powell drew a leadoff walk off Harry Gumbert, stole second, moved to third on a groundout, and scored on Gomez's single. After another single, back-to-back RBI singles by Red Rolfe and DiMaggio made it 15–4 Yankees. One out later, Dickey's three-run home run capped the scoring.

DiMaggio made a tremendous play in Game 2. With two outs in the bottom of the ninth inning, Hank Leiber drove the ball 490 feet (150 m) deep into dead center, and Joe caught the ball running up the steps of the clubhouse. This remarkable catch was at least 40 feet (12 m) further than Willie Mays' far more celebrated catch of Vic Wertz's drive to deep straightaway center in Game 1 of the 1954 World Series. After DiMaggio's game-ending grab, President Roosevelt, who was in attendance, saluted Joe for his great catch as he rode off in the presidential limousine. All three ninth-inning outs were made by DiMaggio.

Yankee second baseman Tony Lazzeri became only the second player ever to hit a grand slam home run in the World Series. Elmer Smith of the Cleveland Indians had been the sole achiever of that feat in World Series play, doing so in Game 5 of the 1920 World Series.

After seeing the score of this game, legendary Dodgers broadcaster Vin Scully (then 9 years old) became a Giants fan as he felt bad for the losing side. He credited this game as the game that made him fall in love with the game of baseball.

=== Game 3 ===
Saturday, October 3, 1936 1:30 pm (ET) at Yankee Stadium in Bronx, New York
Team	1	2	3	4	5	6	7	8	9	R	H	E
New York (NL)	0	0	0	0	1	0	0	0	0	1	11	0
New York (AL)	0	1	0	0	0	0	0	1	X	2	4	0
WP: Bump Hadley (1–0) LP: Freddie Fitzsimmons (0–1) Sv: Pat Malone (1); Home runs: NYG: Jimmy Ripple (1); NYY: Lou Gehrig (1)

Hard luck-loser Freddie Fitzsimmons allowed only two hits over seven innings, one of them a tremendous home run by Gehrig in the second inning, but after the Giants tied the game in the fifth inning on Jimmy Ripple's home run off Bump Hadley, Frankie Crosetti's single with the count 0–2 and two outs scored Jake Powell with the decisive run in the eighth inning. Pat Malone pitched a scoreless ninth for the save.

=== Game 4 ===
Sunday, October 4, 1936 2:00 pm (ET) at Yankee Stadium in Bronx, New York
Team	1	2	3	4	5	6	7	8	9	R	H	E
New York (NL)	0	0	0	1	0	0	0	1	0	2	7	1
New York (AL)	0	1	3	0	0	0	0	1	X	5	10	1
WP: Monte Pearson (1–0) LP: Carl Hubbell (1–1); Home runs: NYG: None; NYY: Lou Gehrig (2)

The Yankees struck first in the second when Jake Powell reached on an error and scored on George Selkirk's single off Carl Hubbell. Next inning, Frank Crosetti hit a leadoff double and scored on Red Rolfe's single, then Lou Gehrig's two-run home run gave the Yankees a 4–0 lead. Jimmy Ripple's RBI single in the fourth off Monte Pearson put the Giants on the board. Bill Terry's groundout with runners on first and third in the eighth cut the Yankees' lead to two, but they got that run back in the bottom half when Gehrig hit a leadoff double off Frank Gabler and scored on Powell's single. Pearson won his first World Series game (he won three more, in 1937, 1938, and 1939).

=== Game 5 ===
Monday, October 5, 1936 1:30 pm (ET) at Yankee Stadium in Bronx, New York
Team	1	2	3	4	5	6	7	8	9	10	R	H	E
New York (NL)	3	0	0	0	0	1	0	0	0	1	5	8	3
New York (AL)	0	1	1	0	0	2	0	0	0	0	4	10	1
WP: Hal Schumacher (1–1) LP: Pat Malone (0–1); Home runs: NYG: None; NYY: George Selkirk (2)

The Giants struck first with back-to-back leadoff doubles by Jo-Jo Moore and Dick Bartell off Red Ruffing. RBI singles by Jimmy Ripple and Burgess Whitehead made it 3–0 Giants. George Selkirk's home run off Hal Schumacher in the second put the Yankees on the board. Next inning, with runners on second and third, an error on Frank Crosetti's groundball allowed another run to score. A similar situation in the sixth on Burgess Whitehead's groundball allowed the Giants to pad their lead to 4–2, but in the bottom half, three consecutive two-out singles allowed the Yankees to tie the game. Bill Terry's sacrifice fly in the top of the tenth inning off Pat Malone, scoring Jo-Jo Moore, who doubled to leadoff and moved to third on a sacrifice bunt, helped the Giants win Game 5, 5–4, to extend the series to a Game Six.

=== Game 6 ===
Tuesday, October 6, 1936 1:30 pm (ET) at Polo Grounds in Manhattan, New York
Team	1	2	3	4	5	6	7	8	9	R	H	E
New York (AL)	0	2	1	2	0	0	0	1	7	13	17	2
New York (NL)	2	0	0	0	1	0	1	1	0	5	9	1
WP: Lefty Gomez (2–0) LP: Freddie Fitzsimmons (0–2) Sv: Johnny Murphy (1); Home runs: NYY: Jake Powell (1); NYG: Mel Ott (1), Jo-Jo Moore (1)

The Giants loaded the bases in the first off Lefty Gomez on a single and two walks before Mel Ott drove in two with a double, but Jake Powell's home-run after a two-out triple off Freddie Fitzsimmons tied the game in the second. Next inning, Lou Gehrig's sacrifice fly after two one-out singles put the Yankees up 3–2. They extended their lead to 5–2 in the fourth on four singles, two of which (by Gomez and Red Rolfe) scored a run each. Ott's home run in the fifth cut the lead to 5–3, then in the seventh, Dick Bartell hit a leadoff double and scored on Bill Terry's single to make it a one-run game. Tony Lazzeri's RBI single in the eighth off Slick Castleman made it 6–4 Yankees, but the Giants again cut the lead to one on Jo-Jo Moore's home run in the bottom half off Johnny Murphy. The Yankees, though, blew it open in the ninth. After two leadoff singles off Dick Coffman, an error on Bill Dickey's fielder's choice allowed one run to score. A walk loaded the bases before Powell drove in two more runs for the Yankees with a single. Harry Gumbert relieved Coffman and after a walk loaded the bases, Murphy's single, Crosetti's walk, Rolfe's groundout, and Joe DiMaggio's single scored a run each to make it 13–5 Yankees. It was the first time in history that a team would score seven runs in the 9th inning of a postseason game. No team has surpassed this mark, although five have tied it (the next one to occur after this one took place 34 years later). Murphy retired the Giants in order in the bottom of the ninth to give the Yankees the championship.

== Composite line score ==
1936 World Series (4–2): New York Yankees (A.L.) over New York Giants (N.L.)

Team	1	2	3	4	5	6	7	8	9	10	R	H	E
New York Yankees	2	5	13	2	0	3	2	3	13	0	43	65	6
New York Giants	5	1	0	4	3	2	1	6	0	1	23	50	7
Total attendance: 302,924 Average attendance: 50,487; Winning player's share: $6,431 Losing player's share: $4,656

== Aftermath ==
The Yankees' fifth championship tied the record at that time, which was shared by the Boston Red Sox and the Philadelphia Athletics, who also had five World Series titles. The Yankees also tied the American League record at that time for the most World Series appearances with eight, also shared with the Athletics. They broke both records the following year. The Giants appeared in their 11th World Series, extending the record they already held at that time, and their seventh World Series defeat also extended the record they already owned.

DiMaggio would go on to be the only person to play on four World Championship teams in his first four years in the big leagues, the 1936–39 Yankees.

The Yankee left fielder Jake Powell began the 1936 season with the Washington Senators before being traded to the New York Yankees in exchange for Ben Chapman. During the 1936 World Series, Powell led all hitters with 10 hits, a .455 batting average, eight runs, and four walks, while also recording a home run, five runs batted in, and the Yankees' only stolen base. His performance declined over the following seasons, and he was released by the Yankees in 1940. His tenure with the team was marked by a 1938 controversy in which he made racist remarks during a live radio interview, stating that he used physical violence against Black people while working as a police officer in the off-season. In 1948, after being arrested for passing bad checks, Powell died by suicide inside a police station at the age of 40.

== See also ==
- Subway Series / Giants–Yankees rivalry
