= Hal Schumacher =

American baseball player (1910-1993)

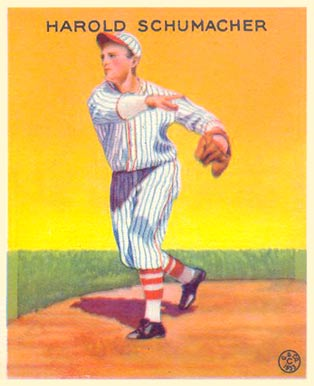
- Pitcher
- Born: November 23, 1910; Hinckley, New York, U.S.
- Died: April 21, 1993 (aged 82); Cooperstown, New York, U.S.
- Batted: Right Threw: Right

MLB debut
- April 15, 1931, for the New York Giants

Last MLB appearance
- September 25, 1946, for the New York Giants

MLB statistics
- Win–loss record: 158–121
- Earned run average: 3.36
- Strikeouts: 906
- Stats at Baseball Reference

Teams
- New York Giants (1931–1942, 1946)

Career highlights and awards
- 2× All-Star (1933, 1935); World Series champion (1933)

Harold Henry Schumacher (November 23, 1910 – April 21, 1993), nicknamed "Prince Hal", was an American professional baseball player and right-handed pitcher who appeared in 391 games pitched (and 450 games in all) in Major League Baseball for the New York Giants in two different stints from 1931 to 1942 before coming back for one more season in 1946. A native of Hinckley, a village in Trenton, New York, he was listed as 6 feet (1.83 m) tall and 190 pounds (86 kg).

== Career ==
Schumacher was still an undergraduate at St. Lawrence University when he first signed with the Giants in 1931. He required only eight games of minor league seasoning before earning a place on the Giants' pitching staff in 1932. The following year (during which he received his degree from St. Lawrence), Schumacher helped pitch the Giants to the 1933 National League pennant and World Series championship. Early in that season, Schumacher finished his Bachelor of Science degree, then played in an exhibition game between the Giants and the St. Lawrence University Larries following his commencement ceremony. Schumacher's 19 victories, 2582/3 innings pitched, 21 complete games, seven shutouts and 2.16 earned run average were second on the staff only to Carl Hubbell, the future Baseball Hall of Fame left-hander. During the 1933 fall classic, he started two games against the Washington Senators and won Game 2, 6–1, turning in a complete game, five-hit effort and driving in three runs himself. He also started the clinching Game 5, and departed in the sixth inning with the score tied, 3–3. Adolfo Luque came on in relief and was the winning pitcher, as the Giants triumphed 4–3 in extra innings.

Schumacher won 23 games in 1934, his best season. From 1933 to 1935, he was 61–31 with 12 shutouts, but after their 1933 title, the Giants finished in arrears of the St. Louis Cardinals (1934) and Chicago Cubs (1935). Then the Giants won back-to-back NL pennants in 1936 and 1937. Schumacher's regular-season record was only 24–25, but he drew three more starting assignments in World Series play. In 1936, he started two games against the heavy-hitting New York Yankees. He dropped Game 2, exiting with none out in the third inning and charged with four runs against in an eventual 18–4 Yankee rout. Then he started Game 5 and held the Yanks to three earned runs in ten innings. His 5–4 victory kept the Giants' hopes alive, but they were eliminated in Game 6 by the Yankees, who were en route to four straight world championships. A year later, Schumacher started Game 3 of the 1937 World Series and lost a 5–1 decision.

He continued to take a turn in the Giants' starting rotation from 1938 to 1942, then entered the United States Navy, serving in the Pacific Theatre of Operations, and missed three full seasons during World War II.

Schumacher came back briefly in 1946 and won his first two starts, pitching complete games in each. But he worked infrequently after mid-June and retired at the close of the season.

During his pitching career, Schumacher posted a 158–121 won-lost record, with 329 starting assignments. He registered 137 complete games and 26 shutouts and added seven saves during his infrequent bullpen appearances. In 2,4821/3 innings pitched, he allowed 2,424 hits and 902 bases on balls. He fanned 906 and compiled a lifetime ERA of 3.36. In World Series action, he went 2–2 (4.13), allowing 35 hits and 19 walks in 322/3 innings pitched; he struck out 17. An accomplished batsman and baserunner among pitchers, Schumacher appeared in 61 MLB games as a pinch runner, pinch hitter or centerfielder, hitting .202 (181-for-896) with 15 home runs lifetime, six of them in 1934. Defensively he was also above average, recording a .971 fielding percentage which was 11 points higher than the league average at his position.

Schumacher was selected to the National League squad for two of the first three All-Star games ever played, including the inaugural edition in 1933. He did not appear in that contest, but returned to the NL All-Star team in 1935 and hurled four innings of one-run ball in the American League's 4–1 victory at Cleveland Stadium.

== Later life ==
Schumacher died of stomach cancer on April 21, 1993, in Cooperstown, New York.

== See also ==
- List of Major League Baseball all-time leaders in home runs by pitchers
- List of Major League Baseball players who spent their entire career with one franchise
