= Joe Martin (third baseman) =

American baseball player (1911–1960)

- Third baseman
- Born: July 28, 1911; Seymour, Missouri, U.S.
- Died: September 28, 1960 (aged 49); Buffalo, New York, U.S.
- Batted: Right Threw: Right

MLB debut
- April 21, 1936, for the New York Giants

Last MLB appearance
- April 19, 1938, for the Chicago White Sox

MLB statistics
- Batting average: .267
- Home runs: 0
- Runs batted in: 2
- Stats at Baseball Reference

Teams
- New York Giants (1936); Chicago White Sox (1938)

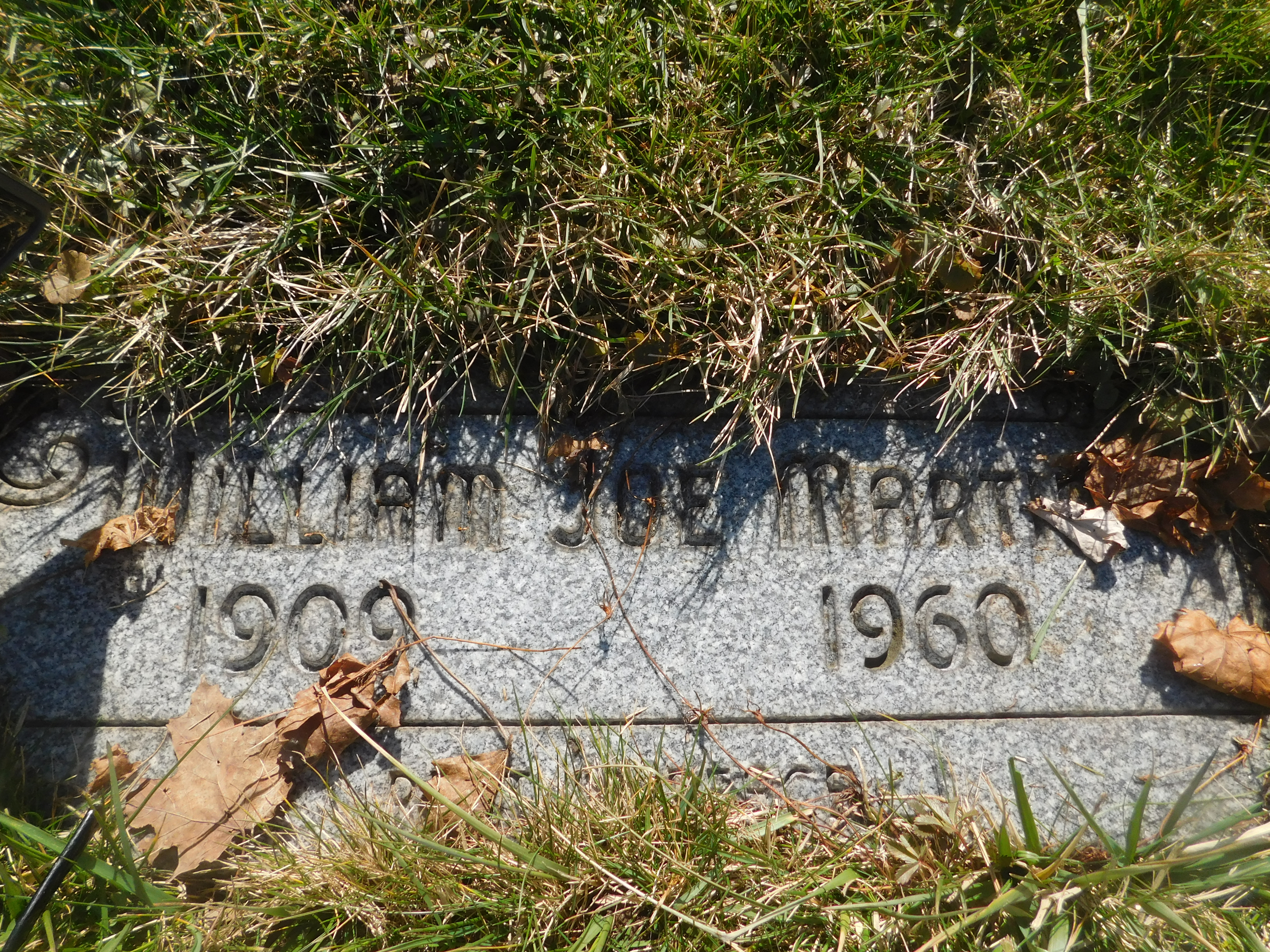
Martin's grave in Ridge Lawn Cemetery, Cheektowaga, New York (headstone states 1909 instead of 1911).

William Joseph "Smokey Joe" Martin (July 28, 1911 – September 28, 1960) was an American professional baseball third baseman in Major League Baseball. Martin played for the New York Giants in 1936 and the Chicago White Sox in 1938.
