= Jim Sheehan (baseball) =

American baseball player (1913-2003)

- Catcher
- Born: June 3, 1913; New Haven, Connecticut
- Died: December 2, 2003 (aged 90); New Haven, Connecticut
- Batted: Right Threw: Right

MLB debut
- September 26, 1936, for the New York Giants

Last MLB appearance
- September 26, 1936, for the New York Giants

MLB statistics
- Games played: 1
- At bats: 4
- Hits: 0
- Stats at Baseball Reference

Teams
- New York Giants (1936)

James Thomas Sheehan (June 3, 1913 – December 2, 2003), nicknamed "Big Jim", was a catcher in Major League Baseball. He played for the New York Giants.
