= Kiddo Davis =

American baseball player (1902–1983)

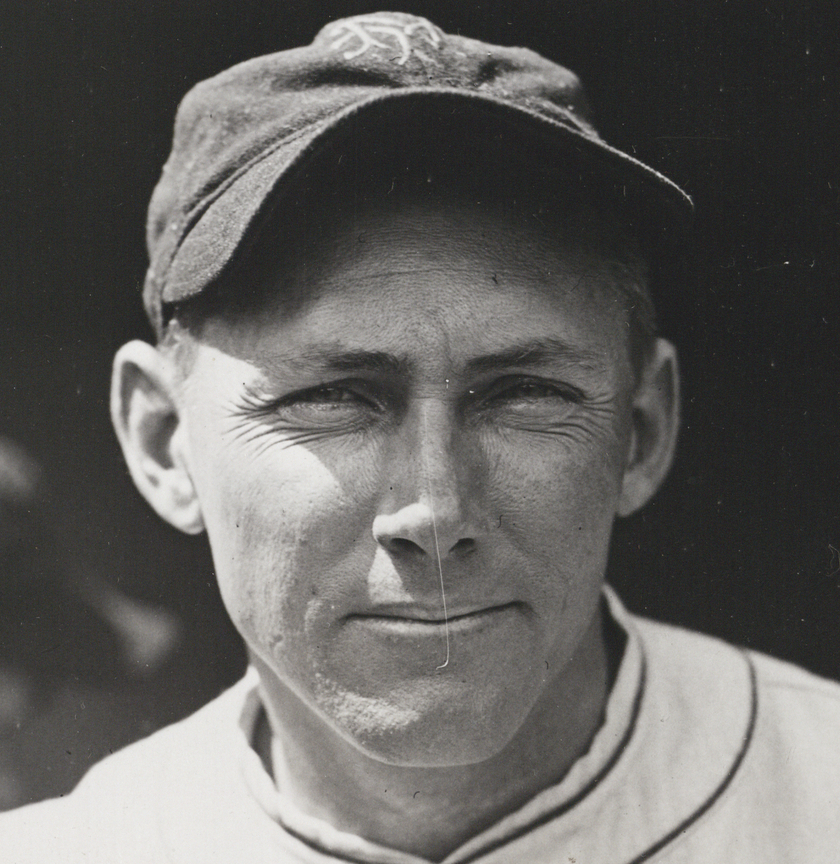
- Center fielder
- Born: February 12, 1902; Bridgeport, Connecticut, U.S.
- Died: March 4, 1983 (aged 81); Bridgeport, Connecticut, U.S.
- Batted: Right Threw: Right

MLB debut
- June 15, 1926, for the New York Yankees

Last MLB appearance
- May 7, 1938, for the Cincinnati Reds

MLB statistics
- Batting average: .282
- Home runs: 19
- Runs batted in: 171
- Stats at Baseball Reference

Teams
- New York Yankees (1926); Philadelphia Phillies (1932); New York Giants (1933); St. Louis Cardinals (1934); Philadelphia Phillies (1934); New York Giants (1935–1937); Cincinnati Reds (1937–1938)

Career highlights and awards
- World Series champion (1933)

George Willis "Kiddo" Davis (February 12, 1902 – March 4, 1983) was an American Major League Baseball outfielder. He played all or part of eight seasons in the majors, 1926 and 1932-1938. He played for the St. Louis Cardinals, Cincinnati Reds, New York Giants, New York Yankees, and Philadelphia Phillies.

== Biography ==
Born in Bridgeport, Connecticut, Davis acquired the nickname “Kiddo” because he typically played baseball with children who were a few years older than he was. Davis attended Bridgeport High School before beginning his professional baseball career. He attended New York University where he also played baseball, batting .486 as an outfielder.

In an eight-year major league career, Davis batted .282 (515-1824) with 281 runs scored, 19 home runs and 171 RBI. His on-base percentage was .336 and slugging percentage was .393. He compiled a .980 fielding percentage at all three outfield positions. In nine World Series games (1933 and 1936), he hit .381 (8-21).

Davis died in Bridgeport in 1983.
