= Monte Pearson =

American baseball player (1908–1978)

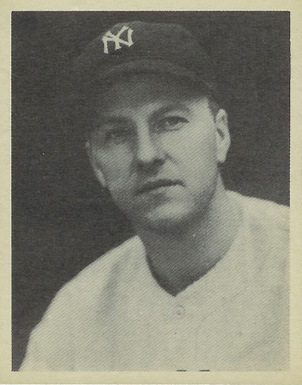
- Pitcher
- Born: September 2, 1908; Oakland, California, U.S.
- Died: January 27, 1978 (aged 69); Fowler, California, U.S.
- Batted: Right Threw: Right

MLB debut
- April 22, 1932, for the Cleveland Indians

Last MLB appearance
- August 5, 1941, for the Cincinnati Reds

MLB statistics
- Win–loss record: 100–61
- Earned run average: 4.00
- Strikeouts: 703
- Stats at Baseball Reference

Teams
- Cleveland Indians (1932–1935); New York Yankees (1936–1940); Cincinnati Reds (1941)

Career highlights and awards
- 2× All-Star (1936, 1940); 4× World Series champion (1936–1939); Pitched a no-hitter on August 27, 1938

Montgomery Marcellus Pearson (September 2, 1908 – January 27, 1978) was an American professional baseball pitcher who played ten seasons in Major League Baseball (MLB). Nicknamed "Hoot", he played for the Cleveland Indians, New York Yankees and Cincinnati Reds from 1932 to 1941. He batted and threw right-handed and served primarily as a starting pitcher.

Pearson played minor league baseball for three different teams until 1932, when he signed with the Cleveland Indians. After spending four seasons with the organization, Pearson was traded to the New York Yankees, where he spent the next five years. At the conclusion of the 1940 season, he was traded to the Cincinnati Reds, with whom he played his last game on August 5, 1941. A four-time World Series champion, Pearson holds the MLB record for lowest walks plus hits per inning pitched (WHIP) in the postseason. He is noted for pitching the first no-hitter at the original Yankee Stadium.

== Early life ==
Pearson was born on September 2, 1908, in Oakland, California. He was raised as a member of the Church of Jesus Christ of Latter-day Saints and was one of the first Mormons to find success in the major leagues. He later moved to Fresno, California and studied at Fresno High School, where he started playing baseball at catcher and third base and was a letterman in four sports. After graduating, he attended college at the University of California, Berkeley, where he played two seasons of baseball for the California Golden Bears from 1928 to 1929. He worked as a mechanic as one of his first jobs, and his ability to sing and play the guitar helped develop his reputation as a positive influence on the clubhouse throughout his major league career.

== Professional career ==
=== Minor leagues ===
Pearson began his professional baseball career in 1929 with the Bakersfield Bees, a Minor League Baseball team that were members of the California State League. He was signed by the Oakland Oaks of the Pacific Coast League the following year, and was optioned to the Arizona State League's Phoenix Senators after recording a 5.77 earned run average (ERA) in 24 games pitched. However, he established himself in the Oaks' pitching rotation in 1931 and compiled a 17–16 win–loss record and a 4.46 ERA in 234 innings pitched. His performance that year, coupled with his heavy-breaking curveball, caught the attention of the Cleveland Indians, who promptly bought his contract after the season ended.

=== Cleveland Indians (1932–1935) ===
Pearson made his major league debut for the Indians on April 22, 1932, at the age of 23, relieving Pete Appleton in the eighth inning and giving up 6 earned runs in 1 2/3 innings in a 16–3 loss against the Detroit Tigers. His subsequent games were disappointing and, after compiling a 10.13 ERA in 8 innings from 8 games pitched, he was demoted back to the minor leagues. He played the rest of the season for the Toledo Mud Hens of the American Association (AA), where continued his dismal performance with a 3–9 record and 3.99 ERA. However, he improved significantly the following year, posting an 11–5 record and 3.41 ERA in 148 innings with the Mud Hens, as well as leading the AA in strikeouts at the time he was called back up to the majors. His pitching during the first half of the season prompted the Indians to bring him back up to the first team in early July. He continued to pitch well in the majors and finished the season with a 10–5 record; his 2.33 ERA was the lowest in the American League (AL) that year and although he pitched only 135 1/3 innings, he is recognized as the AL ERA champion by Baseball-Reference.com.

Pearson followed up his impressive 1933 season with another strong showing in 1934. That year, he finished second in the AL in games started (33), fifth in strikeouts (140) and complete games (19) and sixth in wins (18). In spite of 13 losses, a 4.52 ERA, 130 walks (the second-highest in the AL) and 15 wild pitches (the most in MLB), this was considered one of his best seasons. However, his poor performance in 1935—where he went 8–13 with a 4.90 ERA—convinced the Indians to cut their losses with their once-promising prospect. Pearson was traded at the end of the season to the New York Yankees with Steve Sundra in exchange for Johnny Allen.

=== New York Yankees (1936–1940) ===
Pearson's trade to the New York Yankees was initially unpopular among fans, with Joe McCarthy receiving heavy criticism for dealing Allen—who had a 13–6 record in 1935—for Pearson. However, Pearson repaid his manager's faith in him by churning out the best statistical year in his career. His .731 winning percentage (19–7 record) was third best in the AL; he finished fifth in ERA (3.71) and strikeouts (118) and sixth in wins, though he also recorded the third-highest number of walks in the AL with 135. His performance during the first half of the season resulted in him being selected for the 1936 All-Star Game, though he did not pitch in it. In the postseason, the Yankees advanced to the World Series, where they defeated the New York Giants 4–2. In Game 4, Pearson—who insisted on being included in the rotation even after falling ill with pleurisy just before the Series—limited the Giants to just two runs while striking out seven in a complete game win. Offensively, he managed to get two hits, including a double. The 5–2 victory ended Carl Hubbell's streak of 17 consecutive regular and postseason wins. (Note: This streak combines both regular season and postseason statistics. Hubbell extended his regular season winning streak to 24 games, a major league record that still stands.)

During spring training of 1937, Pearson injured his right ankle after accidentally stepping onto a rolling ball. He was still able recover in time for the start the season and pitched solidly. In arguably his best start of the year, he threw a one-hit shutout against the Chicago White Sox on May 10; he also recorded three hits and drove in two runs in the 7–0 win. However, other health problems and injuries—most notably a sore arm—began to affect him, limiting his season to just 144 2/3 innings pitched in 20 games started and 2 games finished in relief. Despite his many ailments, he still came up clutch in Game 3 of the 1937 World Series. Facing a familiar foe in the New York Giants, Pearson stymied them to a solitary run in 8 2/3 innings pitched and received the win as the Yankees cruised to a 5–1 victory, taking a commanding 3–0 lead in the Series. The Yankees eventually triumphed in 5 games, giving Pearson his second World Series ring in as many years with the team.

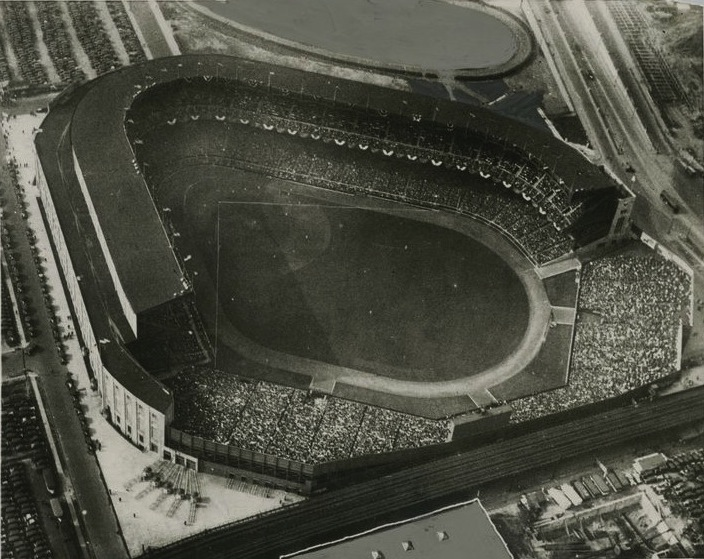
Pearson was the first pitcher to throw a no-hitter at the original Yankee Stadium.

The 1938 season saw Pearson rebound in his regular season numbers. He had the fifth-highest winning percentage (.696), the sixth most wins (16) and the seventh most complete games (17) in the AL, but he struggled with his control, ending the season with 9 wild pitches (second-highest in the AL) and 113 walks (fifth most). During a June 26 road game at Briggs Stadium, he held the Detroit Tigers to three runs in a complete game, 10–3 Yankees win. By not giving up any home runs in the game, he halted the Tigers' quest of breaking the MLB record for most consecutive games with a home run for a team. The highlight of his season came on August 27, when he pitched a no-hitter against the Cleveland Indians in the second game of a doubleheader. Facing his former team on only two days of rest, Pearson struck out seven, allowed just two baserunners through walks and retired the last 18 consecutive batters in a 13–0 victory, marking his 13th win of the season and 10th consecutive win. This was the first Yankee no-hitter in fifteen years (pitched by Sad Sam Jones), as well as first no-hitter at Yankee Stadium.

"Where does that guy get all that stuff? I've seen some pretty good curveball pitchers, but that fellow can certainly make the ball duck over the corners."

— Gabby Hartnett, manager of the Chicago Cubs, after his team was defeated by Pearson in Game 3 of the 1938 World Series.

In October, Pearson suffered from a dead arm. Doctors advised him to undergo surgery after X-rays revealed a spur on his elbow. However, he was able to overcome injury once again and pitched in Game 3 of the 1938 World Series. Up against the Chicago Cubs, he kept them to two runs (one earned) while striking out nine in a complete game, 5–2 win. The Yankees completed their Series sweep over the Cubs in the next game, giving them their third straight championship.

During the 1938–39 offseason, Pearson became a contract holdout after he rejected the Yankees' initial offer. Reportedly the same amount he had earned the season before ($10,000), he described the contract offer as "not up to [his] expectations." The two sides eventually agreed to a contract worth $13,500. He kept up his good pitching, garnering the seventh-highest winning percentage (.706) in the AL that year, though his ERA ballooned to 4.49. Throughout the season, problems in his pitching arm flared up again, restricting him to just 146 1/3 innings pitched and 20 games started. As a result, his inclusion on the postseason roster was not guaranteed; in late September, McCarthy appeared resigned to the fact that Pearson would not "be able to help [him] in this series." However, he managed to shrug off his injury woes and was penciled into the starting rotation for Game 2 of the 1939 World Series. Facing the Cincinnati Reds, he held them hitless through 7 1/3 innings pitched—eventually giving up just two singles—while striking out eight and walking one in a complete game, 4–0 victory. Pearson's sublime pitching performance is considered one of the greatest in World Series history; with a game score of 90, it is one of only eight Fall Classic starts to record a game score of 90 or above. The Yankees proceeded to sweep the Reds two games later, resulting in their fourth consecutive championship and giving Pearson the distinction of winning a World Series ring in every season of his Yankees tenure.

In 1940, Pearson's pitching during the first half of the season earned him his second All-Star Game selection, but he was not called upon to pitch in it. About a week after the game, on July 17, (Note: The Biographical Dictionary of American Sports incorrectly lists the date of the game in which Pearson was injured in as July 15, 1940. He did not pitch on that day. The game in which he faced Bob Feller was on July 17, as confirmed by Baseball-Reference.com.) he tore his shoulder ligament which prematurely shortened his playing career. After pitching 13 innings against Bob Feller and his former team, Pearson eventually won the game but the injury—discovered after a full physical examination on his sore arm a few weeks after the game—ended his season; he finished with a 7–5 record and 3.69 ERA in only 109 2/3 innings pitched and 16 games started. He received treatment at the Union Memorial Hospital in Baltimore, and at the end of the season, he was placed on waivers and traded to the Cincinnati Reds in exchange for Don Lang and $20,000.

=== Cincinnati Reds and back to the minors (1941) ===
Pearson's final major league team was the one he pitched his World Series two-hitter against. Due to his history of injuries, the Yankees refused to offer a guarantee and thus, no other team was willing sign him. However, Reds manager Bill McKechnie made the gamble, remarking how Pearson "showed [the Reds] more that day than any National League right-hander showed [them] that season" when he threw the two-hitter against them. Pearson expressed his delight at the trade and looked forward to working with McKechnie. However, he was unable to rediscover his pre-injury form; in his first start for the Reds, Pearson was battered by the opposing team, giving up six earned runs and five walks to the Chicago Cubs before being pulled out of the game after only 1 1/3 innings. In a total of 7 games pitched–4 starts and 3 games finished—for the Reds, he pitched poorly, posting a 1–3 record with a 5.18 ERA in just 24 1/3 innings pitched. This dismal showing convinced the Reds to cut ties with Pearson, and he was sold to the Hollywood Stars of the Pacific Coast League on August 21.

Pearson's sojourn in the minor leagues was brief, lasting just one game. In his only start for the Stars, he pitched a complete game, giving up six hits and three walks in five innings. He announced his retirement from baseball the following year on August 27.

== Personal life ==
Pearson married Cleo Wimer in January 1931. They had two sons and a daughter. He remained with Cleo for thirty-two years, before she filed for divorce in 1962. One son, Larry, was signed by the Washington Senators in 1959. Pearson remarried to Nellie.

During the 1939 offseason, Pearson was nearly killed while hunting with William Rudolph, a 15-year-old high school baseball player from Fresno. Rudolph accidentally fired his shotgun at the same time as Pearson. The shot penetrated Pearson's cap and knocked it from his head. Pearson, who escaped uninjured, described the incident as "the thrill of [his] life." In 1942, during a leave of absence away from baseball to recover from injury, Pearson worked at the Fresno Air National Guard Base as a firefighter. After his Major League career ended, he planned on switching to a career in boxing, but returned to Fresno State College and graduated with a degree in chemistry. He became the chief sanitarian of Madera County. He unsuccessfully ran for a seat on the Fresno County Board of Supervisors in 1952.

On May 15, 1962, Pearson was arrested and charged with accepting bribes in exchange for approving shoddy septic tanks. In November of that year, he was found guilty of one count of bribery involving $200. The court sentenced him to eight months imprisonment and placed him on probation for three years. After a long battle with cancer, Pearson died on January 27, 1978 in Fowler, California. He was 69 years old and cremated.

== Legacy ==
Twice an All-Star with a 100–61 record in the regular season, Pearson excelled in the postseason. He won all four of his World Series starts, finishing with a 4–0 win–loss record. His 0.729 walks plus hits per inning pitched (WHIP) is the lowest of all time in the postseason, while he also has the second-lowest hits per nine innings (4.794) and seventh-lowest ERA (1.01). Opposing batters hit only .151 (19-126) against him. Together with teammate Red Ruffing, they held a combined 8–1 record and a 1.79 ERA spanning from the 1936–39 World Series, and the two are viewed as one of the most dominant postseason pitching duos of all time.

Pearson appeared on the Baseball Hall of Fame ballot in 1958. He received just one vote—0.4% of the vote—and was not included on any subsequent ballots. He was inducted into the Fresno Athletic Hall of Fame in 1967.

Pearson was a better than average hitting pitcher in his 10-year major league career, compiling a .228 batting average (117-for-513) with 58 runs, 24 doubles, 2 home runs, 62 runs batted in (RBIs) and 39 base on balls. For the 1939 Yankees, he hit .321 (17-for-53), his best year for average. He had 10 RBIs for the Indians in 1934 and 20 RBIs in 1936 for the Yankees. In the post-season, in 4 World Series games, he batted .250 (3-for-12) with a run scored.

== See also ==
- List of Major League Baseball no-hitters

== Notes ==
Achievements
Preceded by Johnny Vander Meer	No-hitter pitcher August 27, 1938	Succeeded by Bob Feller
