= Hank Leiber =

American baseball player (1911–1993)

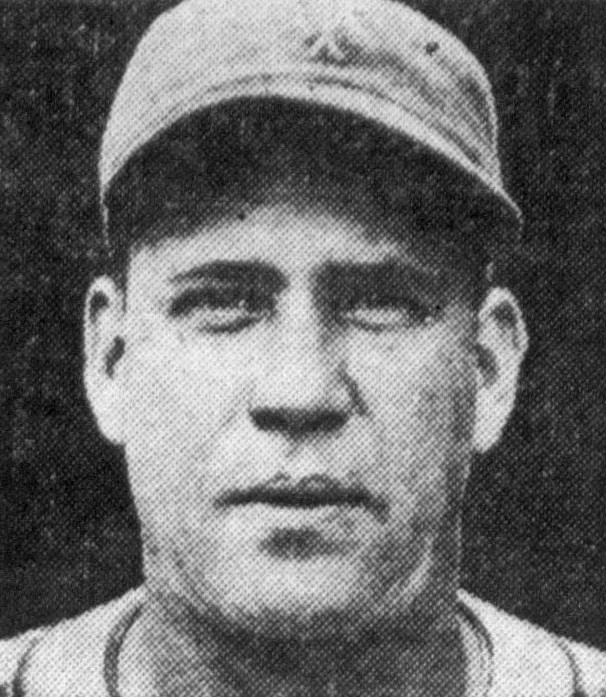
- Leiber, circa 1943
- Center fielder
- Born: January 17, 1911; Phoenix, Arizona, U.S.
- Died: November 8, 1993 (aged 82); Tucson, Arizona, U.S.
- Batted: Right Threw: Right

MLB debut
- April 16, 1933, for the New York Giants

Last MLB appearance
- September 25, 1942, for the New York Giants

MLB statistics
- Batting average: .288
- Home runs: 101
- Runs batted in: 518
- Stats at Baseball Reference

Teams
- New York Giants (1933–1938); Chicago Cubs (1939–1941); New York Giants (1942)

Career highlights and awards
- 3× All-Star (1938, 1940, 1941)

Henry Edward Leiber (January 17, 1911 – November 8, 1993) was an American professional baseball player. He played as an outfielder in Major League Baseball from 1933 to 1942 with the New York Giants and Chicago Cubs.

== Early life ==
Leiber was born in Phoenix, Arizona in 1911. He attended Phoenix Union High School and the University of Arizona and was a pitcher for the Arizona Wildcats baseball team. He began his professional baseball career in 1932. He hit .362 with the Winston-Salem Twins of the Class B level Piedmont League and debuted in the majors the following April, with the Giants. However, he spent most of 1933 with the Memphis Chickasaws of the Southern Association, where he hit .358. In 1934, he started the season with the Nashville Volunteers. He was hitting .424 through 45 games when he was again called up by the Giants, this time for good.

== Major league career ==
Leiber came up to the major leagues at the beginning of the 1933 season, and batted .200 over 6 games and 10 at-bats. However, he was reassigned to the minor leagues for the rest of the season. Leiber batted just .241 over 63 games and 187 at-bats with the Giants in 1934. The following season, he broke out, hitting .331 with 22 home runs and 107 runs batted in. He finished 11th in the 1935 National League Most Valuable Player Award voting; this would remain his best season in the majors. Leiber was a hold-out the following spring. He eventually played in 101 games, but his numbers dropped and he only batted .279. Leiber platooned with Jimmy Ripple, who played in the games Leiber did not play.

Leiber is remembered for hitting one of the longest fly ball outs in major league history. On October 2, 1936, during Game 2 of the 1936 World Series at the Polo Grounds, Leiber hit a long fly ball to deep, center field that traveled an estimated 490 feet from home plate, before being caught by Joe DiMaggio for the final out of the game.

Leiber had a tendency to crowd the plate while hitting. During spring training in 1937, he was beaned by one of the fastest pitchers in history, Bob Feller. Leiber suffered a concussion and was bothered by dizziness for the rest of the season. However, he eventually recovered enough to play in the 1937 World Series, hitting for a .364 average in three games.

Leiber was named to the All-Star team in 1938. That December, he was traded to the Chicago Cubs, and he responded with two good seasons — hitting over .300 in 1939 and 1940 and being named to his second All-Star team. On July 4, 1939, he hit 3 home runs in a game in a losing effort against the St. Louis Cardinals.

On June 23, 1941, Leiber was beaned again, this time by Cliff Melton. He missed the rest of the season and was traded back to the New York Giants. He did play in 1942 but suffered a calf injury, and his production suffered. Although he had never pitched at the major league level, in the final game of his MLB career, Leiber took the mound in a game against the Phillies on September 25, 1942. Leiber was able to pitch a complete game in a 9–1 loss. With World War II going on, Leiber went back to his home in Arizona. He did not return to the majors when the war ended.

In a 10-year major league career, Leiber played in 813 games, accumulating 808 hits in 2,805 at bats for a .288 career batting average along with 101 home runs, 518 runs batted in and an on-base percentage of .356. He retired with a .974 fielding percentage.

== Later life ==
Leiber managed the Tucson Cowboys of the Arizona–Texas League for one season (1950). He eventually became a successful real-estate developer.

In 1963, Leiber was inducted into the Arizona Sports Hall of Fame. He died in Tucson, Arizona at the age of 82.
