= Jo-Jo Moore =

American baseball player (1908-2001)

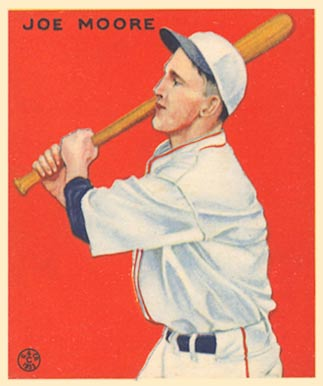
- Left fielder
- Born: December 25, 1908; Gause, Texas, U.S.
- Died: April 1, 2001 (aged 92); Gause, Texas, U.S.
- Batted: Left Threw: Right

MLB debut
- September 17, 1930, for the New York Giants

Last MLB appearance
- September 21, 1941, for the New York Giants

MLB statistics
- Batting average: .298
- Home runs: 79
- Runs batted in: 513
- Stats at Baseball Reference

Teams
- New York Giants (1930–1941)

Career highlights and awards
- 6× All-Star (1934–1938, 1940); World Series champion (1933)

Joe Gregg Moore, Sr. (December 25, 1908 – April 1, 2001) was an American left fielder in Major League Baseball who played his entire career with the New York Giants from 1930 through 1941. Moore batted left-handed and threw right-handed. He was born in Gause, Texas, and nicknamed the "Gause Ghost." He was 5' 11" and weighed 155 pounds.

Moore was an intimidating, left-handed-hitting leadoff man, a line-drive hitter who hit over .300 five times in his major league career and led the National League in at-bats in 1935. The free-swinging Moore never struck out more than 37 times in a season, collecting only 247 SO in 5427 at-bats (4.6%).

In 1932, Moore enjoyed a 20-game hitting-streak despite appearing in just 86 games. His most productive season came in 1934, when he collected a career-high .331 batting average with 106 runs, 192 hits, 15 home runs and 37 doubles. A year later he fell to .295, but collected 201 hits with 108 runs, nine triples and 71 RBI, all career numbers, while adding 15 home runs. During the next three seasons Moore hit .316, .310 and .302, with a career-high 205 hits in 1936.

Underrated because he was overshadowed by more colorful teammates, Moore was a fixture for the Giants in left field. He appeared in three World Series (1933, 1936–37), and six times was named to the National League All-Star team (1934–38 and 1940). In the 1933 Series Moore had two hits in one inning, and in the 1937 Series he tied a record of the time by collecting nine hits in a five-game series.

In a 12-season career, Moore was a .298 hitter with 79 home runs and 513 RBI in 1335 games. Defensively, he recorded a .975 fielding percentage as an outfielder. In 16 World Series games, he hit .274 with one home run and three RBI.

After the 1941 season, Moore was sold to the Cincinnati Reds. He played full-time in the 1942 and 1943 seasons for the Indianapolis Indians of the Minor League Baseball American Association. After his baseball career, he returned to Gause, Texas and raised cattle.

Moore died in his hometown of Gause at the age of 92. He was the last surviving member of the 1933 World Champion New York Giants.

== See also ==
- List of Major League Baseball players who spent their entire career with one franchise

== Sources ==
- Career statistics from Baseball Reference · Retrosheet · Baseball Almanac
- Baseball Almanac
- The Deadball Era
