= Jimmy Ripple =

American baseball player (1909–1959)

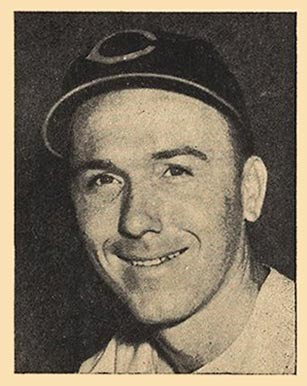
- Outfielder
- Born: October 14, 1909; Export, Pennsylvania, U.S.
- Died: July 16, 1959 (aged 49); Greensburg, Pennsylvania, U.S.
- Batted: Left Threw: Right

MLB debut
- April 20, 1936, for the New York Giants

Last MLB appearance
- September 12, 1943, for the Philadelphia Athletics

MLB statistics
- Batting average: .282
- Home runs: 28
- Runs batted in: 251
- Stats at Baseball Reference

Teams
- New York Giants (1936–1939); Brooklyn Dodgers (1939–1940); Cincinnati Reds (1940–1941); Philadelphia Athletics (1943)

Career highlights and awards
- World Series champion (1940)

James Albert Ripple (October 14, 1909 – July 16, 1959) was an American professional baseball player who played as an outfielder in Major League Baseball for seven seasons, from 1936 to 1943. Ripple appeared for the New York Giants (1936–1939), Brooklyn Dodgers (1939–1940), Cincinnati Reds (1940–1941) and Philadelphia Athletics (1943). He had a .282 career batting average, with 28 home runs and 251 RBIs in 554 games played. He played in three World Series, two with the Giants (1936–1937), and one with the Reds in 1940, the last of which won the championship.

In addition to his major league playing time, Ripple had a twelve-season minor league baseball career. He played eight seasons for the Montreal Royals, parts of two for the Rochester Red Wings, and the same for the Toronto Maple Leafs, all of the International League. In 1956, he was elected into the International League Hall of Fame.

== Career ==
=== Minor leagues ===
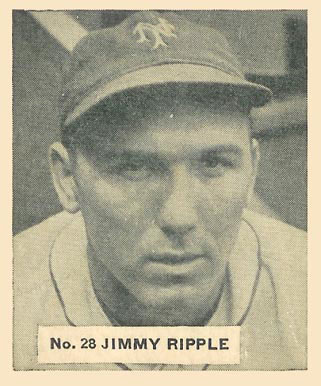
Baseball card of Ripple

James Albert Ripple was born on October 14, 1909, in Export, Pennsylvania. He made his first appearance in professional baseball at the age of 19 for the class-C Jeannette Jays of the Middle Atlantic League for the start of the 1929 minor league baseball season. He played in 104 games for the Jays, hitting 24 triples, and 14 home runs, while batting .336, before being promoted to the Montreal Royals of the Class-AA International League for the remainder of the season. For the next six years, through the 1935 season, he remained with the Royals, playing as a starting outfielder. During that span, he appeared in at least 130 games each season, hitting for career highs with 21 home runs in 1932, and a .333 batting average in 1935.

=== Major Leagues ===
==== New York Giants ====
On June 22, 1935, Ripple was sold by Montreal to the New York Giants of the National League and made his first appearance for the major league team on April 20, 1936. Platooning with Hank Leiber, Ripple started 74 games in center field for the Giants and appeared in 96 games total in 1936, and had a .305 batting average, seven home runs, and 47 RBIs. The Giants won the National League pennant and met the New York Yankees of the American League in the 1936 World Series. Although the Yankees won the series four games to two, Ripple played in five of the six games played, starting four in center field and had a batting average of .333. In game three, he hit a home run in the fifth inning off Bump Hadley to score the Giants only run in a 2–1 defeat.

In 1937, Ripple's playing time increased to 121 games, and his 100 starts were split between center and right field, and with the expanded role, he established career highs in all major batting categories except for home runs, which dipped to five. After the 1937 season, the Giants won the National League pennant and met the New York Yankees again in the World Series. The Yankees defeated the Giants for the second consecutive year, winning four games to one in this series. Ripple played in right field for all five games, collecting five hits in 17 at bats for a .294 batting average.

Ripple's playing time in 1938 increased further for the 1938 season, up to 134 games, most of which were in the right field. Although his role was expanded, his offensive output significantly dropped compared to his first two seasons with the Giants. His batting average dipped to .261, and he surpassed just one statistical career high with 10 home runs.

==== Brooklyn Dodgers ====
Ripple's play suffered more in 1939, and he was batting only .228 after playing in just 66 games for the Giants; he was traded to the Brooklyn Dodgers on September 8 for a player to be named later, which was later revealed to be Ray Hayworth. However, this move improved his play, and he had a .330 batting average in 28 games to close out the season. For the 1940 season, the Dodgers assigned Ripple to their class-AA International League team, the Montreal Royals. His return to the Royals resulted in another successful minor league season as he had a .305 batting average in 110 games played. In August, the Dodgers promoted him to the majors for a seven-game stretch, then placed him on waivers.

==== Cincinnati Reds ====
The Cincinnati Reds claimed Ripple off waivers from the Dodgers on August 28, 1940, and they made him their regular left fielder for the remainder of the pennant run. In 32 games for the Reds that season, he batted .307 while helping the team win the 1940 National League pennant. Following the regular season, the Reds met the Detroit Tigers in the 1940 World Series, who they defeated in four games to three in a seven-game series. In game two, he hit a two-run home run off Schoolboy Rowe to give the Reds a two-run lead in their eventual 5–3 win to tie the series at one game win each.

==== Later career ====
Ripple began the 1941 season with the Reds, playing in 38 games. However, he was hitting just .216, so the Reds sold him to the St. Louis Cardinals on June 21, who then designated him to their International League team, the Rochester Red Wings. He played in 52 games to complete the season, batted .378, hit five home runs, and had 22 RBIs. In 1942, his batting average dropped to .249 through 78 games, and he was transferred to the Toronto Maple Leafs who were unaffiliated with a major league team.

He remained with the Maple Leafs into the 1943 season, who were now affiliated with the Pittsburgh Pirates, his contract was later bought by the Philadelphia Athletics of the American League, and they promoted him to their major league club. He appeared in 32 games for the Athletics that season, batted .238, and played his last major league game on September 12, 1943. His major league career hitting totals include a .282 batting average, 28 home runs, 236 RBIs, and 510 hits in 554 games played. Defensively, Ripple recorded a .984 fielding percentage. After committing an error on September 11, 1938, against the Brooklyn Dodgers at the Polo Grounds, he went the next 204 games to the end of his major league career in 1943 without another miscue, handling 241 total chances (238 putouts, 3 assists). His last minor league season occurred in 1944 when he played for several class-AA teams: the Louisville Colonels of the American Association (an affiliate of the Boston Red Sox), the San Francisco Seals and Seattle Rainiers of the Pacific Coast League. After 12 minor league seasons, and 1412 games, Ripple totaled 1507 hits, with 128 home runs and a .301 batting average.

== Post-career ==
For his high level of play during his minor league baseball career, he was named to the International League Hall of Fame in 1956. He died at the age of 49 in Greensburg, Pennsylvania of acute hemorrhagic pancreatitis, and is interred at Eastview Cemetery in Delmont, Pennsylvania.
