= Burgess Whitehead =

American baseball player (1910–1993)

- Second baseman
- Born: June 29, 1910; Tarboro, North Carolina, U.S.
- Died: November 25, 1993 (aged 83); Windsor, North Carolina, U.S.
- Batted: Right Threw: Right

MLB debut
- April 30, 1933, for the St. Louis Cardinals

Last MLB appearance
- September 29, 1946, for the Pittsburgh Pirates

MLB statistics
- Batting average: .266
- Home runs: 17
- Runs batted in: 245
- Stats at Baseball Reference

Teams
- St. Louis Cardinals (1933–1935); New York Giants (1936–1937, 1939–1941); Pittsburgh Pirates (1946)

Career highlights and awards
- 2× All-Star (1935, 1937); World Series champion (1934)

Burgess Urquhart "Whitey" Whitehead (June 29, 1910 – November 25, 1993) was an American Major League Baseball second baseman from 1933 to 1946. He played for the St. Louis Cardinals, New York Giants, and Pittsburgh Pirates.

== Biography ==
Whitehead was born in Tarboro, North Carolina. He graduated from Augusta Military Academy in Fort Defiance, Virginia in 1927. He attended the University of North Carolina and started his professional baseball career with the Class AAA Columbus Red Birds in 1931. He batted over .300 in each of the next three seasons, helping to lead the 1933 team to the American Association pennant.

In 1934 and 1935, Whitehead was a utility infielder for the National League Cardinals. He was a member of the 1934 World Series champion team and was friends with future Hall of Famer Dizzy Dean. Whitehead was selected to the All-Star team in 1935.

Whitehead was traded to the Giants in December for first baseman/outfielder Phil Weintraub and pitcher Roy Parmelee. With a weak bat but a good glove at second base, he helped the Giants win two consecutive pennants in 1936 and 1937. In 1937, he led all second basemen in fielding percentage and putouts, and he was named to the All-Star team for the second time.

Before the 1938 season, Whitehead suffered a nervous breakdown following an appendectomy. He sat out the entire season. He came back in 1939 but hit poorly, and his behavior was erratic; he was suspended twice during the season and reportedly assaulted a woman in North Carolina. Nonetheless, Whitehead rejoined the Giants in 1940 and had a good season. His hitting numbers declined again in 1941, however, and he was sold to the International League's Toronto Maple Leafs.

In December 1942, Whitehead was inducted into the Army Air Force. He spent three years out of professional baseball and returned for one more major league season in 1946, with the Pirates. He hit a career-low .220 and went back to the minors with the Jersey City Giants. After two seasons in Jersey City, Whitehead retired.

In 924 games in nine seasons, Whitehead posted a .266 batting average (883-for-3316) with 415 runs, 17 home runs, 245 RBIs and 150 bases on balls. Defensively, he recorded an overall .971 fielding percentage.

Whitehead was married to the former Ruth Madre Lyon, and they had two children. He was the last surviving member of the St. Louis Cardinals' Gashouse Gang team that won the 1934 World Series. In 1981, he was inducted into the North Carolina Sports Hall of Fame.

Whitehead died of a heart attack in 1993.
