= Bump Hadley =

American baseball player (1904–1963)

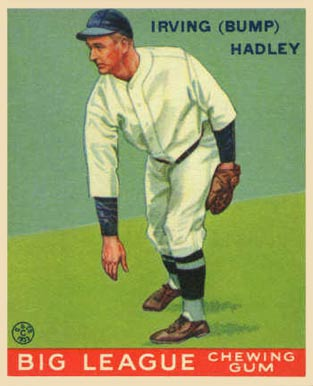
- Pitcher
- Born: July 5, 1904; Lynn, Massachusetts, U.S.
- Died: February 15, 1963 (aged 58); Lynn, Massachusetts, U.S.
- Batted: Right Threw: Right

MLB debut
- April 20, 1926, for the Washington Senators

Last MLB appearance
- September 16, 1941, for the Philadelphia Athletics

MLB statistics
- Win–loss record: 161–165
- Earned run average: 4.24
- Strikeouts: 1,318
- Stats at Baseball Reference

Teams
- Washington Senators (1926–1931); Chicago White Sox (1932); St. Louis Browns (1932–1934); Washington Senators (1935); New York Yankees (1936–1940); New York Giants (1941); Philadelphia Athletics (1941)

Career highlights and awards
- 3× World Series champion (1936, 1937, 1939)

Irving Darius Hadley (July 5, 1904 – February 15, 1963) was an American professional baseball pitcher who played in Major League Baseball. Born in Lynn, Massachusetts, he played in the major leagues for the Washington Senators (1926–31 and 1935), Chicago White Sox (1932), St. Louis Browns (1932–34), New York Yankees (1936–40), New York Giants (1941), and Philadelphia Athletics (1941).

== Early life ==
Hadley was born on July 5, 1904, to Irving A. and Effie B. Hadley in Lynn, Massachusetts. Irving A. Hadley was a successful Boston lawyer and it was expected that his son would follow him in the profession. Hadley attended Lynn English High School, where earned letters in baseball, basketball, track, rowing, and football. He set an interscholastic shot-put record and excelled as a punter on the school's football team. As a member of the school's baseball team, Hadley threw a no-hitter against Chelsea High School. On May 3, 1923, he struck out a North Shore League record 21 batters in a one-hit shutout against Chelsea. He went on to attend Mercersburg Academy. Hadley started out as Mercersburg's third baseman, but moved to the mound after the team's pitcher dropped out of school. On June 4, 1924, Hadley threw a perfect game against the State Forestry School in which he struck out 26 of 27 batters he retired.

After Mercersburg, Hadley attended Brown University. He left the school during his sophomore year after being ruled academically ineligible for the upcoming baseball season and signed with East Douglas in the independent Blackstone Valley League, where he went 17–2.

== Professional career ==
=== Washington Senators ===
Hadley made his major league debut on April 30, 1926, against the New York Yankees. In 3 innings of relief, Hadley gave up 6 hits, 2 walks, and 4 earned runs. Hadley was demoted to the Birmingham Barons, where he posted a 14–7 record with a 3.83 earned-run average. In the spring of 1927, Hadley contracted mumps, which led him receiving the nickname "Bumps" (later shortened to "Bump"). He became the team's #3 starter that year and compiled a 14–6 record with a 2.85 ERA. In 1928, Hadley missed several weeks due to appendicitis. He finished the season with a 12–13 record and a 3.54 ERA. On September 3, 1928, he surrendered Ty Cobb's final career hit. Hadley struggled in 1929, going 6–16 with a 5.62 ERA. He improved the following year with a 15–11 record. In 1931, Senators Manager Walter Johnson elected to use Hadley as a starter for home games only, as he felt that Hadley did not do well on the road. Hadley made a league leading 55 appearances that season (11 starts and 44 relief appearances). He went 11–10, with an improved ERA of 3.06. He also tallied seven saves. That season, Yankees manager Joe McCarthy offered Tony Lazzeri to the Senators for Hadley and infielder Jackie Hayes. The trade did not take place, however, as Clark Griffith wanted Buddy Myer instead of Hayes. Instead, Hadley was traded to the Chicago White Sox after the season with Hayes and Sad Sam Jones for John Kerr and Carl Reynolds.

=== St. Louis Browns ===
After making three appearances for the White Sox, Hadley was traded to the St. Louis Browns for Red Kress. Hadley finished the 1932 season as the American League leader in losses (21), earned runs allowed (149), walks (171), and hit batters (8). In 1933, Hadley went 15–20 with a 3.92 ERA while pitching a league-leading 316 2/3 innings. He finished the following season with a 10–16 record.

=== Return to Senators ===
On January 19, 1935, Hadley was traded to the Senators for catcher Luke Sewell and cash. He posted a 10–15 record with a 4.92 ERA in his return to Washington.

=== New York Yankees ===
On January 17, 1936, Washington traded Hadley and Roy Johnson to the Yankees for Jimmie DeShong and Jess Hill. Hadley was given a spot in the starting rotation by Manager Joe McCarthy. He went 14–4 for the Yankees en route to the team's first AL pennant since 1932. In Game 3 of the 1936 World Series, Hadley gave up 11 hits, but only one run in a 2–1 victory over the New York Giants. The Yankees went on to win the series in six games. On May 25, 1937, Hadley hit Detroit Tigers catcher Mickey Cochrane in the head with a pitch. The pitch fractured Cochrane's skull, which ended his playing career. Hadley insisted that he had not hit Cochrane on purpose. Cochrane and his teammates also absolved Hadley from blame. The Yankees returned to the World Series that year and Hadley started (and lost) game four, but the Yankees won the series four games to one. Hadley was moved to the bullpen early on in 1938, but eventually returned to the stating rotation. He finished the year with a 9–8 record and a 3.60 ERA. The Yankees won their third consecutive championship by sweeping the Chicago Cubs in the 1938 World Series, however Hadley was not included on the World Series roster. Hadley finished the 1939 season 12–6, with a 2.98 ERA. He won game three of the 1939 World Series after pitching eight innings out of the bullpen. The Yankees went on to win the series the following game. Hadley faltered in 1940, going 3–5, with a 5.74 ERA. The team slipped as well, falling to third place in the American League.

=== Giants and Athletics ===
On December 31, 1940, Hadley was sold to the New York Giants. It was the first transaction between the two rival clubs. After making only one appearance with the Giants, Hadley's contract was purchased by the Yankees. However, a day later his contract was sold to the Philadelphia Athletics. According to Shirley Povich of The Washington Post the move was made because "Hadley is on the payroll of the American League publicity department as exhibiting for its official movie film, and the National League would scarcely permit one of its pitchers to promote good-will for the AL".

== Personal life ==
On November 2, 1927, Hadley married Jessie Gibbs at The First Baptist Church of the City of Washington, D.C. The two first met when they attended Lynn English High School. The couple had two children and by the 1940s were residing in Swampscott, Massachusetts.

== Retirement ==
Hadley retired after the 1941 season and returned to Massachusetts. In 1942, he played for a Lynn semipro team and pitched a four-hit shutout against the Boston Braves in an exhibition game benefiting the war-effort.

In 1942 he began hosting a sports show for WBZ radio. In 1948 he became the sports director for WBZ-TV, where he served as an announcer for the Boston Red Sox, Boston Braves, and Boston Bruins. He later worked as a paint salesman, represented a fuel oil company, and sold office equipment. He was also a New England scout for the New York Yankees. On February 15, 1963, Hadley died of heart attack at Lynn Hospital.
