= Charlotte P. Morris =

American academic administrator

9th President of Tuskegee University
- In office August 1, 2021 – June 31, 2024
- Preceded by: Lily McNair
- Succeeded by: Mark Brown

Personal details
- Born: Kosciusko, Mississippi, U.S.
- Education: Jackson State University; Delta State University; Kansas State University

Academic background
- Thesis: A descriptive study of the relationship between undergraduate degree majors and present jobs as perceived by selected black college graduates of the southern region (1983)
- Doctoral advisor: Jordan Utsey

Academic work
- Discipline: Education
- Institutions: Kansas State University; Trenholm State Community College; Mississippi Valley State University; Tuskegee University

Charlotte P. Morris is an American academic administrator. She served as the interim president of Tuskegee University, a private, historically black university in Tuskegee, Alabama, and on July 26, 2021, was elected ninth president of the university by its board of trustees, effective August 1, 2021.

== Early life ==
Morris was born in Kosciusko, Mississippi and is African-American. She graduated from Jackson State University, where she earned a bachelor's degree in business education. She subsequently earned a master's degree from Delta State University, followed by a PhD in education and business management from Kansas State University.

== Career ==
Morris taught at Kansas State University and Trenholm State Community College. She was an administrator at Mississippi Valley State University.

Morris joined the Tuskegee Institute in 1984. Morris served as the interim president between Benjamin F. Payton and Gilbert L. Rochon in 2010. She was interim dean of the Andrew W. Brimmer College of Business and Information Science until 2017, when she began her second term as interim president. She was succeeded as president by Lily McNair in 2018. On July 26, 2021, Morris was elected ninth president of the university by its board of trustees, effective August 1, 2021. Her term ended on June 31, 2024, after which she was succeeded by Mark Brown.

== Personal life ==
Morris is the widow of late Dr. William R. Morris. She has a son, and she lives in Montgomery, Alabama.
