= Brian L. Johnson =

African-American academic

Brian L. Johnson, Ph.D.
- Born: July 8, 1973 (age 53); Durham, North Carolina
- Education: University of South Carolina (Ph.D.) University of Wisconsin-Madison (M.A.) Johnson C. Smith University (B.A.)
- Occupations: Academic administrator, scholar, professor
- Known for: 8th president of Warner Pacific University, 7th president of Tuskegee University
- Notable work: Books on W.E.B. Du Bois, institutional history of Johnson C. Smith University

Brian L. Johnson is an academic and administrator. He currently serves as Executive Vice President/Chief Operating Officer at Edward Waters University. Brian Johnson named Executive Vice President/ Chief Operating Officer at Edward Waters University He has served as 7th President of Tuskegee University and 8th president of Warner Pacific University.

In January 2024, Johnson was named an Andrew W. Mellon foundation funded (CIC) “Pioneering President.” He was the first post-doctoral Mellon Fellow to be named President of a (HBCU) Historically Black College and University when he was named President of Tuskegee University in 2014.President Brian Johnson named (CIC) Council of Independent Colleges “Pioneering President”

He earned his Ph.D. in English in 2003 from the University of South Carolina, where he focused on American literature of the 17th-19th century.

Johnson has held various administrative roles, including as president of Tuskegee University from 2014 to 2017 and Warner Pacific University from 2020 to 2025.

He has also served as vice president at Mercy University from 2018 to 2020; and interim vice president of Strategic Planning and Effectiveness, and Assistant Provost of Academic Affairs at Austin Peay State University from 2010 to 2014. He has authored several scholarly books, including studies on W.E.B. Du Bois Toward Agnosticism (1868–1934) (2008), Du Bois on Reform: Periodical-based Leadership for African Americans (2005) and the institutional history of Johnson C. Smith University.
