= Tuskegee University =

Historically black university in Tuskegee, Alabama, US

- Former names: Tuskegee Normal School for Colored Teachers (1881–1891); Tuskegee Normal and Industrial Institute (1891–1937); Tuskegee Institute (1937–1985)
- Motto: Scientia Principatus Opera
- Motto in English: Knowledge, Leadership, Service
- Type: Private historically black land-grant university
- Established: July 4, 1881; 145 years ago
- Accreditation: SACS
- Academic affiliations: NAICU; ORAU; UNCF; Space-grant
- Endowment: $157 million (2021)
- President: Mark Brown
- Faculty: 263 full-time and 45 part-time (spring 2022)
- Students: 2,570 (fall 2022)
- Undergraduates: 2,100 (fall 2022)
- Postgraduates: 215 (fall 2022)
- Location: Tuskegee, Alabama, United States; 32°25′48.76″N 85°42′27.81″W
- Campus: Rural, 5,200 acres (2,100 ha)
- Newspaper: The TU Campus Digest
- Colors: Crimson and old gold
- Nickname: Golden Tigers
- Sporting affiliations: NCAA Division II – SIAC
- Website: tuskegee.edu
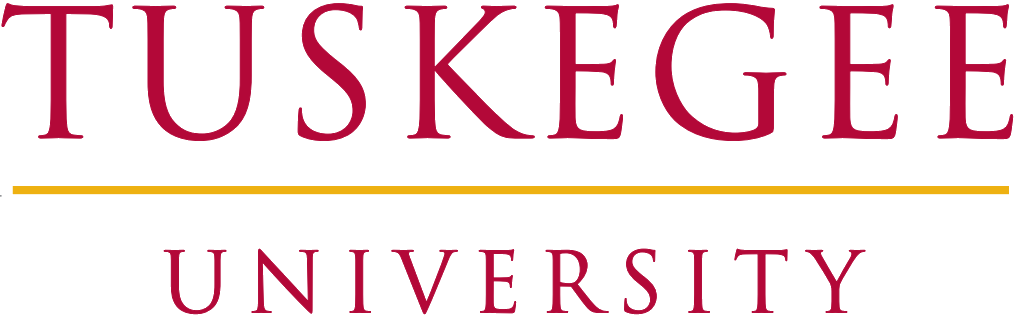

Tuskegee University (Tuskegee or TU; formerly known as the Tuskegee Institute) is a private, historically black land-grant university in Tuskegee, Alabama, United States. The Alabama Legislature founded Tuskegee as a normal school for black teachers on July 4, 1881.

Tuskegee University offers 43 bachelor's degree programs, including a five-year accredited professional degree program in architecture, 17 master's degree programs, and 5 doctoral degree programs, including the Doctor of Veterinary Medicine. Tuskegee is home to nearly 3,000 students from around the U.S. and over 30 countries.

Tuskegee's campus was designed by architect Robert Robinson Taylor, the first African-American to graduate from the Massachusetts Institute of Technology, in conjunction with David Williston, the first professionally trained African-American landscape architect. The campus was designated as the Tuskegee Institute National Historic Site by the National Park Service in 1974. The university has been home to a number of important African American figures, including founder and first president Booker T. Washington, scientist George Washington Carver, and World War II's Tuskegee Airmen. In 1932 Tuskegee was involved, in collaboration with the United States Public Health Service, in recruiting participants for an infamous syphilis study.

== History ==
=== Planning and establishment ===
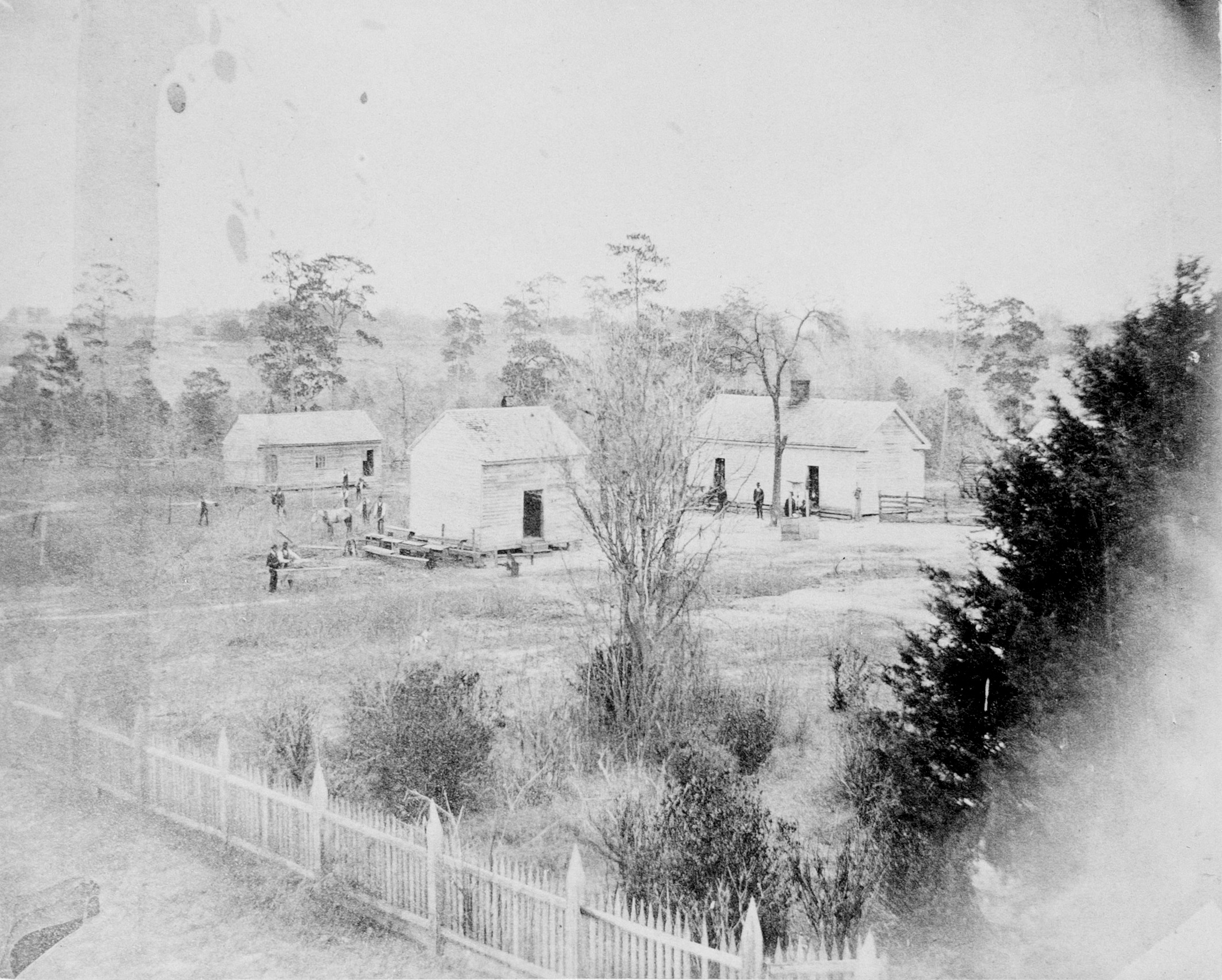
Original campus buildings on the Miller plantation, 1882

The school was founded on July 4, 1881, as the Tuskegee Normal School for Colored Teachers. This was a result of an agreement made during the 1880 elections in Macon County, Alabama, between a former Confederate colonel, Wilbur F. Foster, who was a candidate for re-election to the Alabama Senate, and a local black leader, Lewis Adams. Wilbur Foster offered that, if Adams could persuade the black constituents to vote for Foster, then Foster, if elected, would push the state of Alabama to establish a school for black people in the county. The majority of Macon County's population was black, so black constituents had political power. Adams succeeded and Foster followed through with the school.

The school became a part of the expansion of higher education for black people in the former Confederate states following the American Civil War, with many schools founded by the northern American Missionary Association. A teachers' school was the dream of Lewis Adams, a former slave, and George W. Campbell, a banker, merchant, and former slaveholder, who shared a commitment to the education of black people. Despite lacking formal education, Adams could read, write, and speak several languages. He was an experienced tinsmith, harness-maker, and shoemaker and was a Prince Hall Freemason, an acknowledged leader of the African-American community in Macon County.

Adams and Campbell had secured $2,000 from the State of Alabama for teachers' salaries but nothing for land, buildings, or equipment. Adams, Campbell (replacing Thomas Dryer, who died after his appointment), and M. B. Swanson formed Tuskegee's first board of commissioners. Campbell wrote to the Hampton Institute in Virginia, requesting the recommendation of a teacher for their new school. Samuel C. Armstrong, the Hampton principal and a former Union general, recommended 25-year-old Booker T. Washington, an alumnus and teacher at Hampton.

As the newly hired principal in Tuskegee, Booker T. Washington began classes for his new school in a rundown church and shanty. The following year (1882), he purchased a former plantation of 100 acres in size. In 1973 the Tuskegee Institute, now Tuskegee University, did an oral history interview with Annie Lou "Bama" Miller. In that interview she indicated that her grandmother sold the original 100 acres of land to Booker T. Washington. That oral history interview is located at the Tuskegee University archives. The earliest campus buildings were constructed on that property, usually by students as part of their work-study. By the start of the 20th century, the Tuskegee Institute occupied nearly 2,300 acres.

Based on his experience at the Hampton Institute, Washington intended to train students in skills, morals, and religious life, in addition to academic subjects. Washington urged the teachers he trained "to return to the plantation districts and show the people there how to put new energy and new ideas into farming as well as into the intellectual and moral and religious life of the people." Olivia A. Davidson was instrumental to Tuskegee's success. As assistant principal from 1881, she worked with Washington to raise funds from donors in Massachusetts, and within a few months, they had raised enough to purchase a farm and construct a large school building. Davidson and Washington married in 1886.

Gradually, a rural extension program was developed, to take progressive ideas and training to those who could not come to the campus. Tuskegee alumni founded smaller schools and colleges throughout the South; they continued to emphasize teacher training.

=== Booker T. Washington's leadership ===
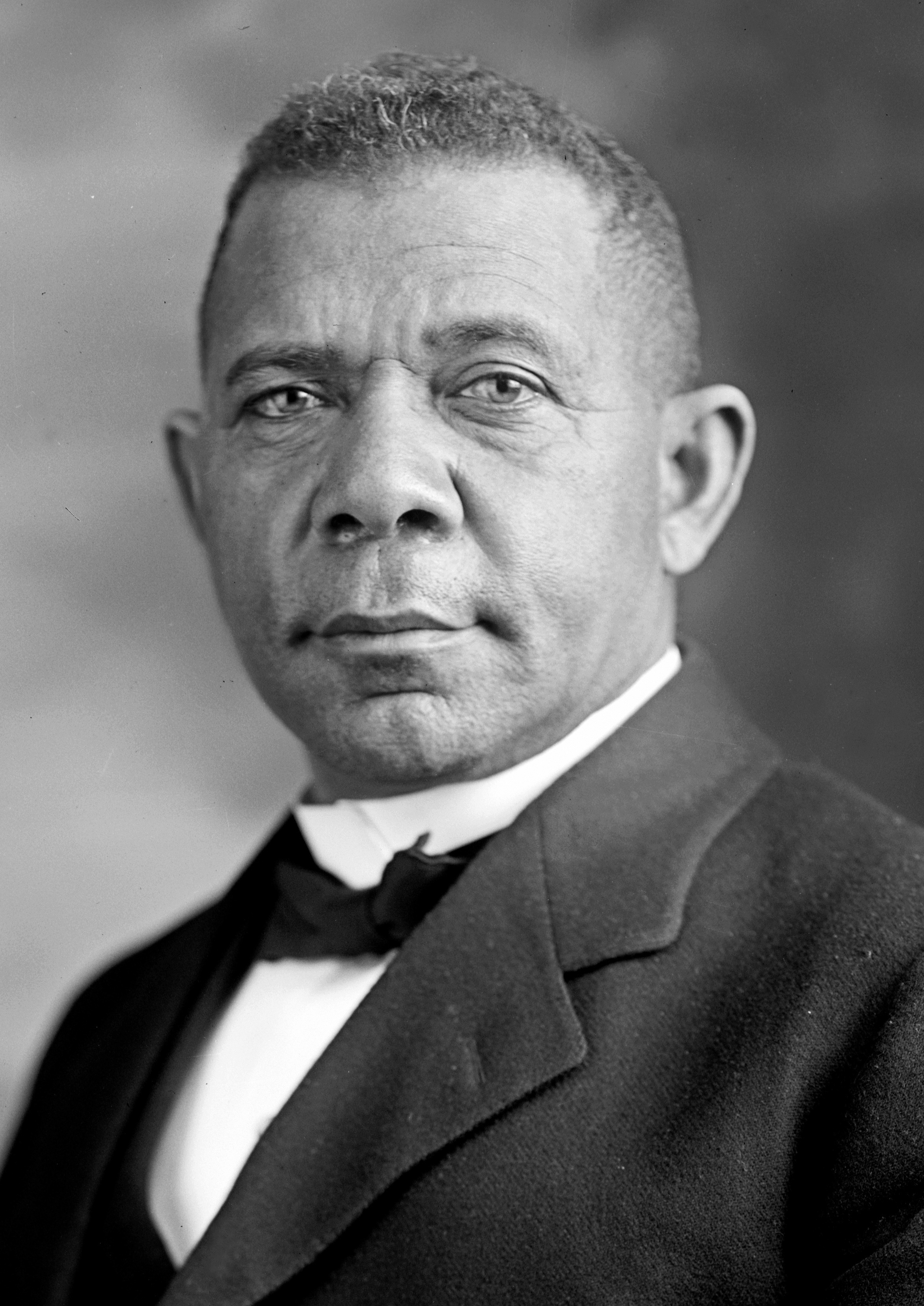
Booker T. Washington

As a young free man after the Civil War, Washington sought a formal education. He worked his way through Hampton Normal and Agricultural Institute (now Hampton University) and attended college at Wayland Seminary in Washington, DC (now Virginia Union University). He returned to Hampton as a teacher.

Hired as principal of the new normal school (for the training of teachers) in Tuskegee, Alabama, Booker T. Washington opened his school on July 4, 1881, on the grounds of the Butler Chapel African Methodist Episcopal Zion Church. In the following year he bought the grounds of a former plantation, out of which he expanded the institute in the decades that followed.

The school expressed Washington's dedication to the pursuit of self-reliance. In addition to training teachers, he also taught the practical skills needed for his students to succeed at farming or other trades typical of the rural South, where most of them came from. He wanted his students to see labor as practical, but also as beautiful and dignified. As part of their work-study programs, students constructed most of the new buildings. Many students earned all or part of their expenses through the construction, agricultural, and domestic work associated with the campus, as they reared livestock and raised crops, as well as producing other goods.

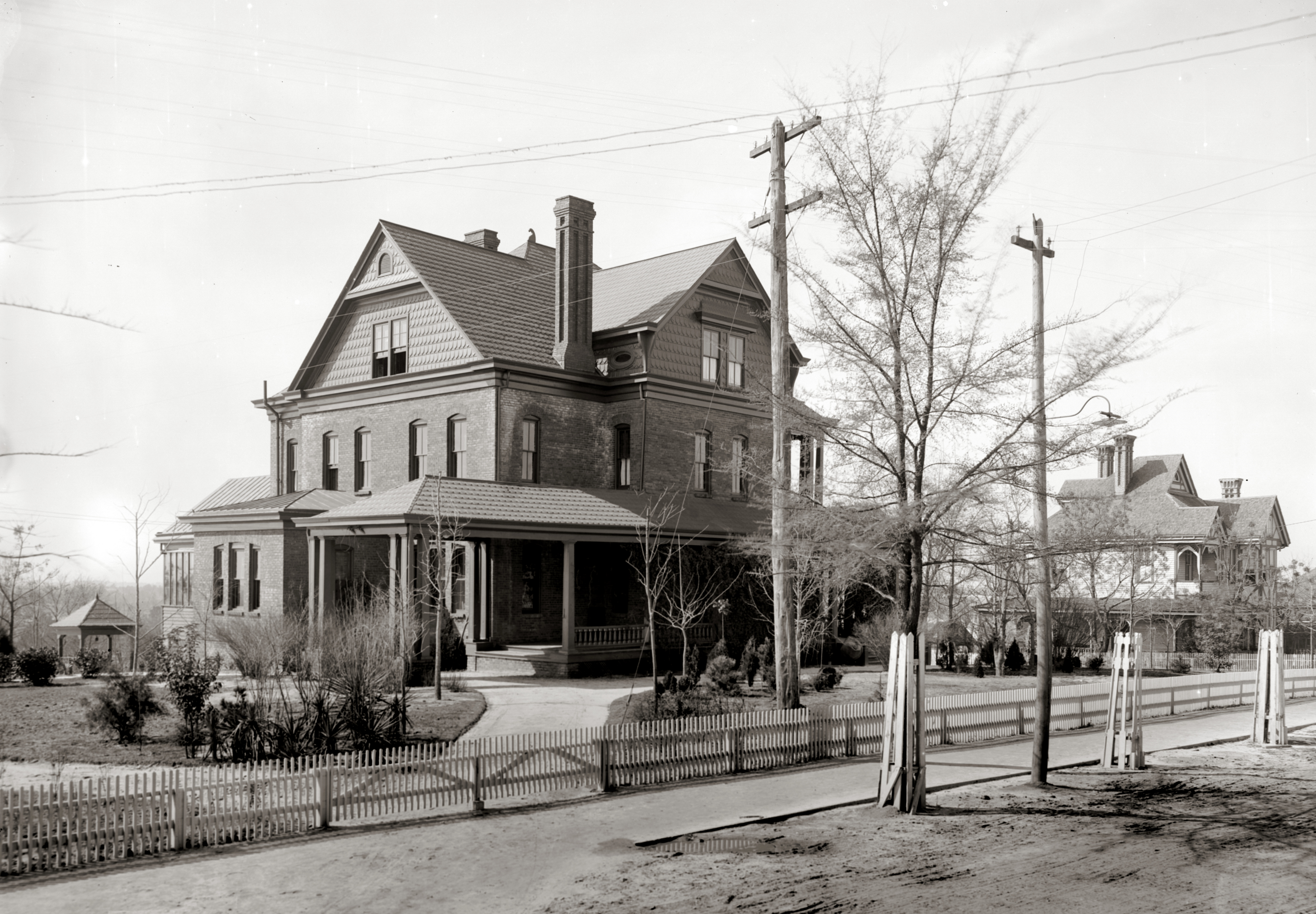
The Oaks, Booker T. Washington's home on the Tuskegee campus, c. 1906

The continuing expansion of black education took place against a background of increased violence against blacks in the South, after Democrats regained power in state governments and imposed white supremacy in society. They instituted legal racial segregation and a variety of Jim Crow laws, after disfranchising most blacks by constitutional amendments and electoral rules from 1890 until 1964. Against this background, Washington's vision, as expressed in his "Atlanta Compromise" speech, became controversial and was challenged by new leaders, such as W.E.B. Du Bois, who argued that blacks should have opportunities for study in classical academic programs, as well as vocational institutes. In the early twentieth century, Du Bois envisioned the rise of "the Talented Tenth" to lead African Americans.

Washington gradually attracted notable scholars to Tuskegee, including the botanist George Washington Carver, one of the university's most renowned professors.

=== 1881–1900 ===
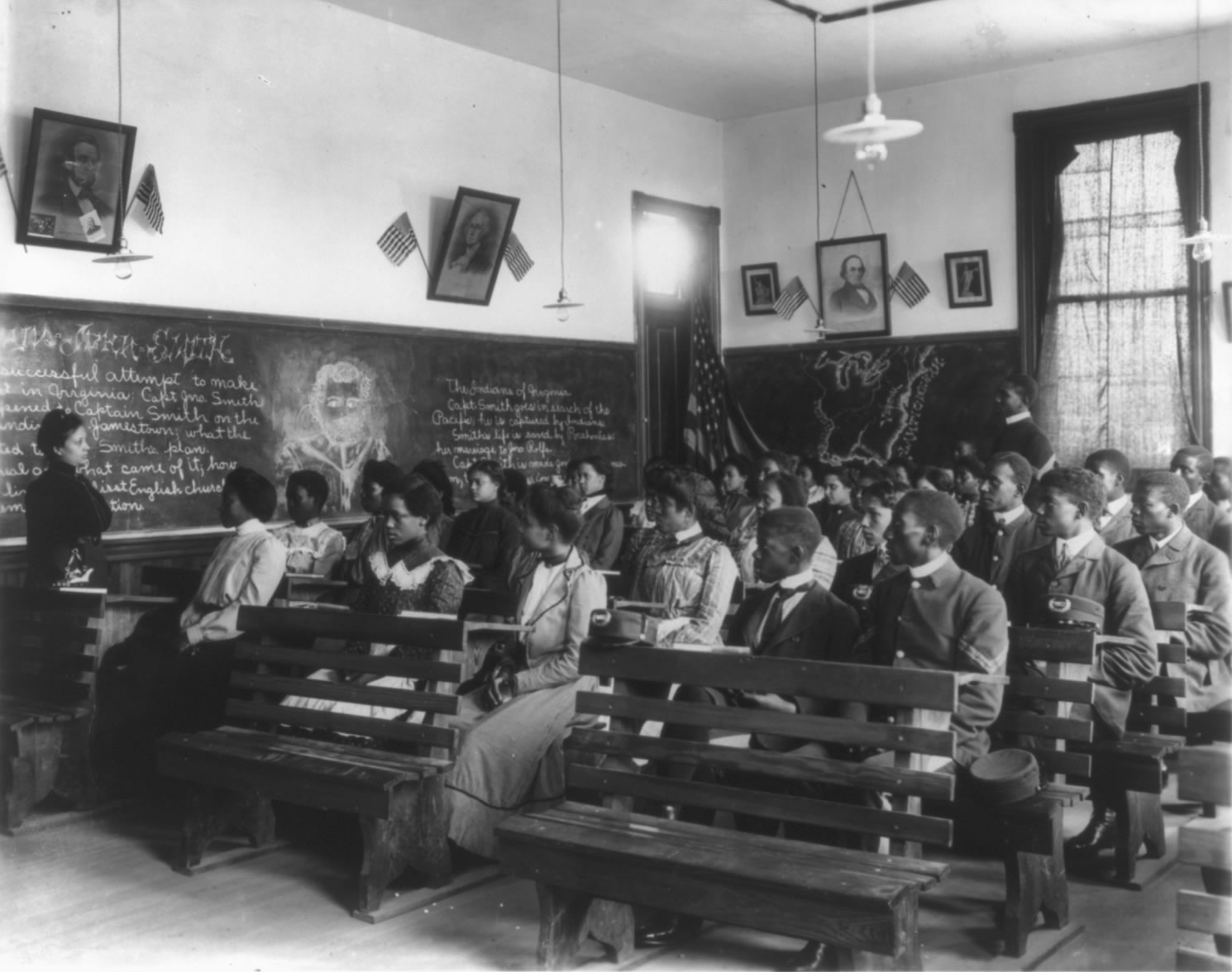
History class at Tuskegee, 1902

Perceived as a spokesman for black "industrial" education, Washington developed a network of wealthy American philanthropists who donated to the school, such as Andrew Carnegie (funding a library building), Collis P. Huntington, John D. Rockefeller, Henry Huttleston Rogers, George Eastman, and Elizabeth Milbank Anderson. An early champion of the concept of matching funds, Henry H. Rogers was a major anonymous contributor to Tuskegee and dozens of other black schools for more than fifteen years. There is some discussion as to whether his strong support for "industrial" education was fully earnest or at least partly a strategy to attract such large donors, as he thought the idea of an "industrial" college would appeal to them. Publication of the article "Industrial Education of the Negro" in a leading magazine designed for African-American readers is one piece of evidence against this claim.

Thanks to recruitment efforts on the island and contacts with the U.S. military, Tuskegee had a particularly large population of Afro-Cuban students during these years. Following small-scale recruitments prior to the 1898–99 school year, the university quickly gained popularity among ambitious Afro-Cubans. In the first three decades of the school's existence, dozens of Afro-Cubans enrolled at Tuskegee each year, becoming the largest population of foreign students at the school.

=== 1900–1915 ===
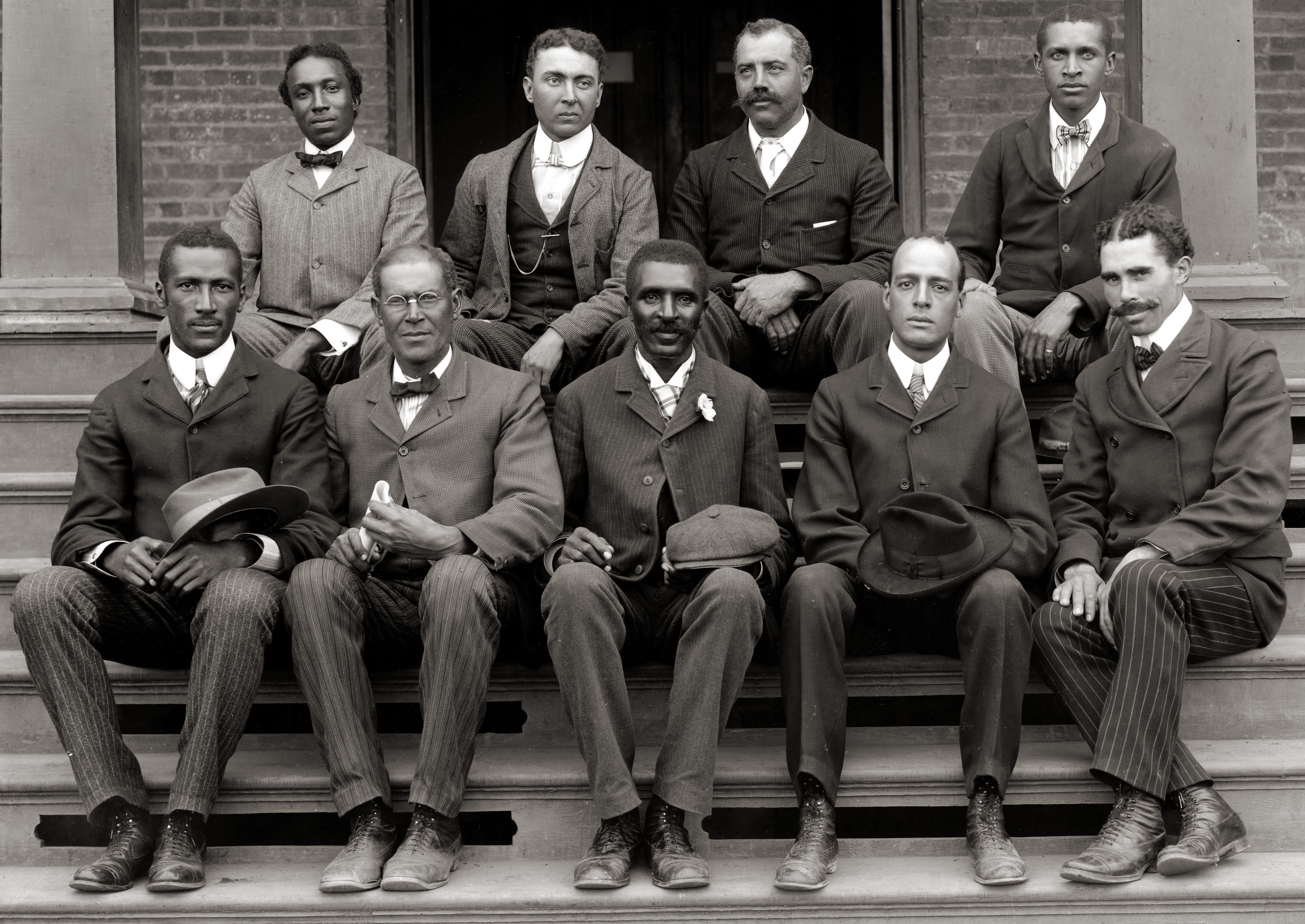
George Washington Carver (front row, center) poses with fellow faculty of Tuskegee Institute in this c. 1902 photograph taken by Frances Benjamin Johnston.

Washington developed a major relationship with Julius Rosenwald, a self-made Jewish-American, who rose to the top of Sears, Roebuck and Company in Chicago, Illinois. He had long been concerned about the lack of educational resources for blacks, especially in the South. After meeting with Washington, Rosenwald agreed to serve on Tuskegee's board of directors. He also worked with Washington to stimulate funding to train teachers' schools such as Tuskegee and Hampton institutes.

Washington was a tireless fundraiser for the institute. In 1905 he kicked off an endowment campaign, raising money all over America in 1906 for the 25th anniversary of the institution. Along with wealthy donors, he gave a lecture at Carnegie Hall in New York on January 23, 1906, called the Tuskegee Institute Silver Anniversary Lecture, in which Mark Twain spoke.

Beginning with a pilot program in 1912, Rosenwald created model rural schools and stimulated construction of new schools across the South. Tuskegee architects developed the model plans, and some students helped build the schools. Rosenwald created a fund but required communities to raise matching funds, to encourage local collaboration between blacks and whites. Rosenwald and Washington stimulated the construction and operation of more than 5,000 small community schools and supporting resources for the education of blacks throughout the rural the South into the 1930s.

Despite his travels and widespread work, Washington continued as principal of Tuskegee. Concerned about the educator's health, Rosenwald encouraged him to slow his pace. In 1915, Washington died at the age of 59, as a result of high blood pressure. At his death, Tuskegee's endowment exceeded US$1.5 million. He was buried on the campus near the chapel.

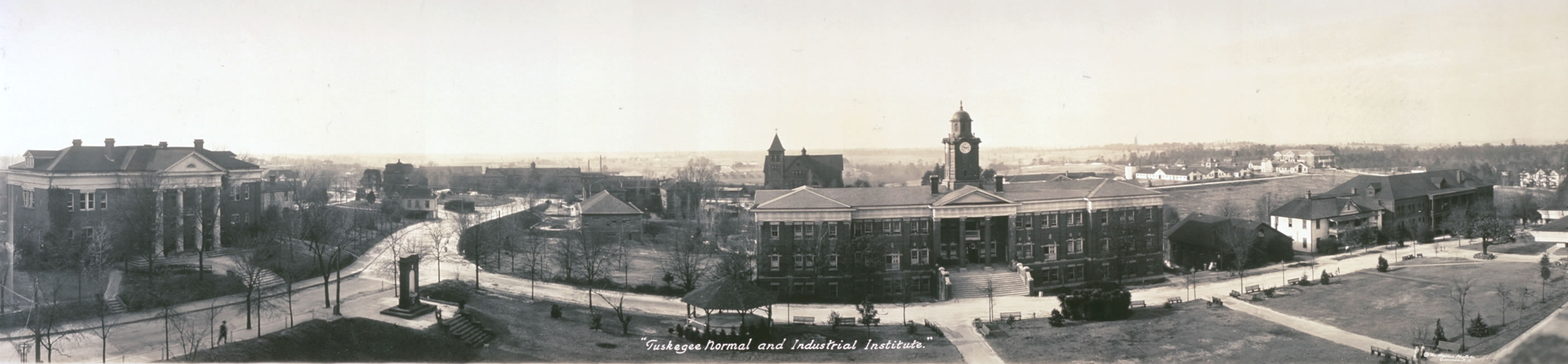
Tuskegee campus, 1916

Tuskegee, in cooperation with church missionary activity, worked to set up industrial training programs in Africa.

=== 1915–1940 ===
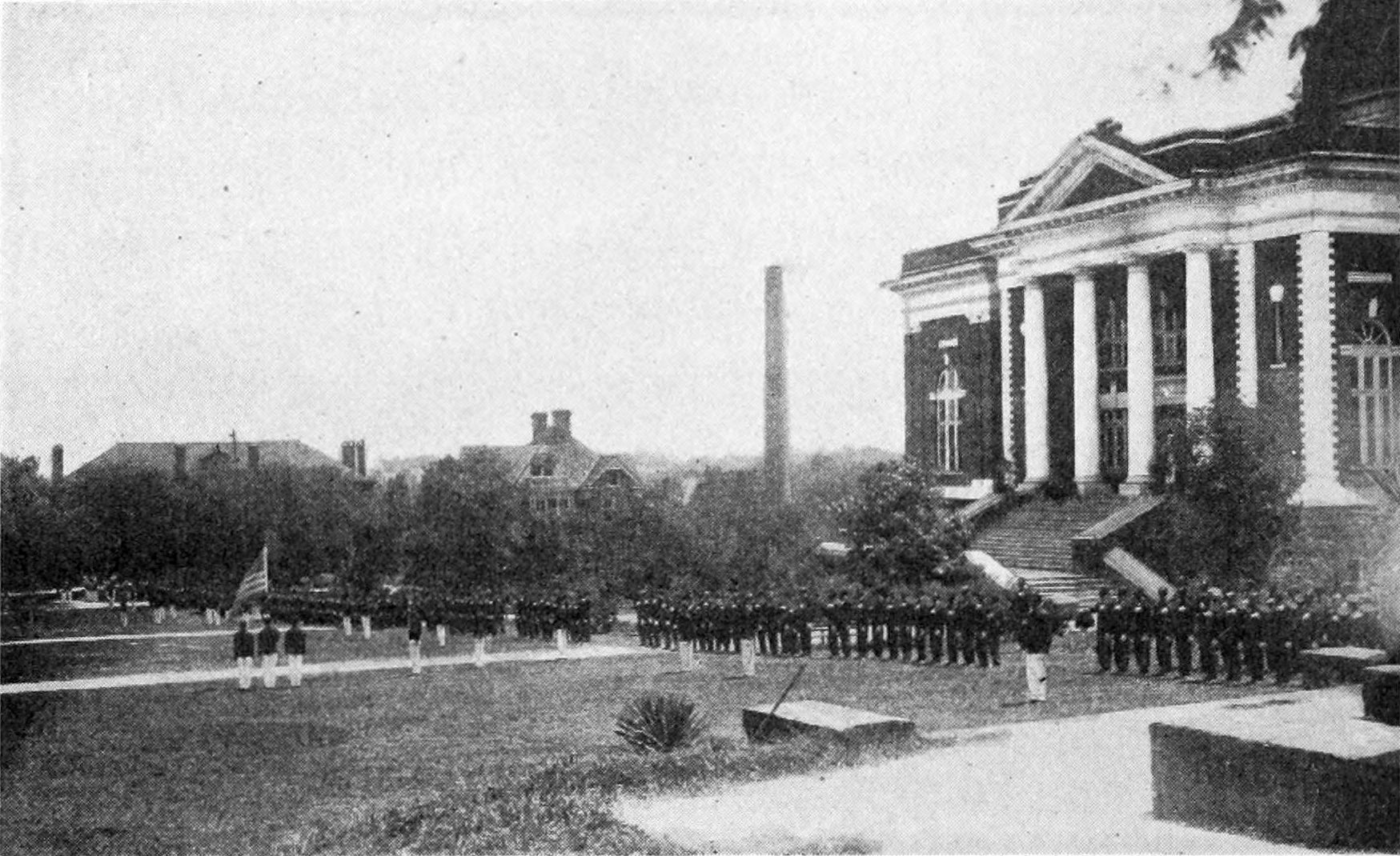
Tuskegee Institute, c. 1916

After Washington's death, he was succeeded as principal by Robert Russa Moton for the next 20 years.

The years after World War I challenged the basis of the Tuskegee Institute. Teaching was still seen as a critical calling, but southern society was changing rapidly. Attracted by the growth of industrial jobs in the North, including the rapid expansion of the Pennsylvania Railroad, suffering job losses because of the boll weevil and increasing mechanization of agriculture, and fleeing extra-legal violence, hundreds of thousands of rural blacks moved from the South to Northern and Midwestern industrial cities in the Great Migration. A total of 1.5 million moved during this period. In the South, industrialization was occurring in cities such as Birmingham, Alabama and other booming areas. The programs at Tuskegee, based on an agricultural economy, had to change. During and after World War II, migration to the North continued, with California added as a destination because of its defense industries. A total of 5 million black Southerners moved out of the South from 1940 to 1970.

=== United States Public Health Service syphilis experiment ===
Tuskegee Institute had become a center for medical excellence, with the John A. Andrew Memorial Hospital (the first full service hospital in the nation developed and operated by African Americans) and the Tuskegee Veterans Hospital (the only ever U.S. African American staffed Veterans Administration hospital). This medical center had more medical professionals than any other medical facility of its size in the U.S. Because of Booker T. Washington's community outreach, with National Health Week, and the success of these facilities, African American families had full trust in science and medicine, which began extending the lives in the African American community. However, in the middle of this progress, from 1932 to 1972, the United States government, through the United States Public Health Service, conducted the USPHS syphilis experiment by which the effects of deliberately untreated syphilis were studied, in Macon County, Alabama, with African-American men, living in remote rural communities near Tuskegee, Alabama. These experiments have become infamous for deceiving study participants, poor African-American men, both by not telling them that they had latent syphilis and by pretending to give them medical care; in fact researchers were only monitoring the progression of the disease, so that when the men were deceased their bodies could be studied in the laboratory. Syphilis is a debilitating disease that can leave its victims with permanent neurological damage and horrifying scars. Penicillin was discovered in 1927 and it was being used to treat human disease by the early 1940s. In 1947 it had become the gold standard in treating syphilis and often only required one intramuscular dose to eliminate the disease. The researchers were well aware of this information and in order to continue their experiments, they chose to withhold the life-saving treatment. The researchers proceeded to actively deter study participants from obtaining penicillin from other physicians. The patients were told that they had "bad blood". This experiment was conducted by the U.S. Public Health Service. This was a direct violation of the Hippocratic Oath; however, not a single researcher was legally punished. Academic research has shown that the study had long-term, damaging effects on black men's health, and the health of their families and contributed to mistrust of white medical professionals among black men.

=== World War II ===
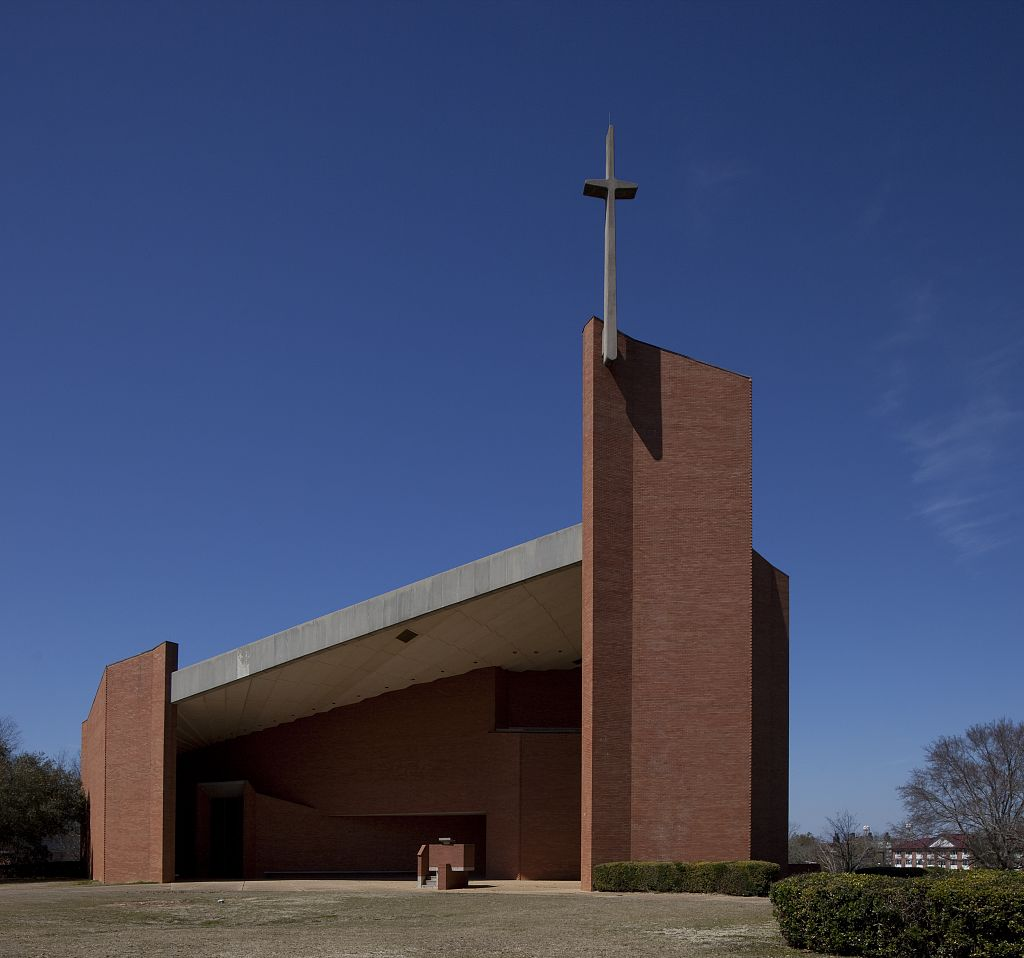
Tuskegee University Chapel (1969)

In 1941, in an effort to train black aviators, the U.S. Army Air Corps established a training program at Tuskegee Institute, using Moton Field, about 4 miles (6.4 km) away from the campus center. The graduates became known as the Tuskegee Airmen. The Tuskegee Airmen National Historic Site at Moton Field was listed on the National Register of Historic Places in 1998. The U.S. Army, Air Force, and Navy have Reserve Officers' Training Corps programs on campus today.

Numerous presidents have visited Tuskegee, including Franklin D. Roosevelt. Eleanor Roosevelt was also interested in the Institute and its aeronautical school. In 1941 she visited Tuskegee Army Air Field and worked to have African Americans get the chance as pilots in the military. She corresponded with F.D. Patterson, the third president of the Tuskegee Institute, and frequently lent her support to programs.

=== Postwar ===
The noted architect Paul Rudolph was commissioned in 1958 to produce a new campus master plan. In 1960 he was awarded, along with the partnership of John A. Welch and Louis Fry, the commission for a new chapel, perhaps the most significant modern building constructed in Alabama.

The postwar decades were a time of continued expansion for Tuskegee, which added new programs and departments, adding graduate programs in several fields to reflect the rise of professional studies. For example, its School of Veterinary Medicine was added in 1944. Mechanical Engineering was added in 1953, and a four-year program in Architecture in 1957, with a six-year program in 1965.

=== Civil Rights activism (1960s) ===
During the 1960s Civil Rights Movement, students at Tuskegee Institute formed the Tuskegee Institute Advancement League (TIAL) to lead civil rights activities on campus. Although TIAL was an affiliate of the Student Nonviolent Coordinating Committee (SNCC), its leaders were local Tuskegee Institute students. TIAL led sit-ins at the state capital, wade-ins (to desegregate city pools), voter registration efforts and education in rural areas and protest marches including a Tuskegee to Montgomery contingent of the Selma to Montgomery March on March 21, 1965. Student activist, Samuel (Sammy) Younge, Jr. was one of TIAL's leaders, and the first Black college student to die in the Civil Rights Movement. His murder by a white gas station attendant, Marvin Segrest, and Segrest's subsequent acquittal by an all-white jury galvanized thousands to march on the city of Tuskegee in protest.

In 1968, student activists seeking more say over their education engaged in a series of protests, sit-ins, walk-outs and other demonstrations at Tuskegee Institute in an effort to get the administration to hear and act upon their demands regarding the quality of life on campus, the quality of the education they received, mandatory Reserve Officer's Training Corps (ROTC) participation, and other grievances. These protests culminated with around 300 students surrounding Dorothy Hall during a meeting of Tuskegee Institute's board of trustees on April 6, 1968, and effectively holding them hostage inside. The governor sent the National Guard to respond to the incident. Immediately afterward, campus was closed down, and all students had to reapply for admission. While initially met with harsh repercussions from the administration, the student activists were ultimately successful in prompting the administration to meet their demands.

=== Recent history ===
In 1985, Tuskegee Institute achieved university status and was renamed Tuskegee University.

In July 2020, philanthropist MacKenzie Scott donated $20 million to Tuskegee. Her donation is the largest single gift in Tuskegee's history from a known donor.

In 2023, Tuskegee received funding from the National Trust for Historic Preservation to develop plans for safeguarding the school's historic buildings against climate change.

In April 2024, Tuskegee received a $20 million gift from an anonymous donor. The major gift will go towards supporting Tuskegee's STEM programs and a variety of campus improvements. The following month, Mark Brown became the first Tuskegee graduate (Class of 1986) to be appointed president of the institution.

Later that same year, on November 10, 2024, LaTavion Jashun Johnson, a visiting 18-year-old high school male, was killed and 16 other people were injured in a mass shooting on campus during homecoming weekend by a lone gunman. The gunman was later identified as 25-year-old Jaquez Myrick; he was not a Tuskegee student and traveled from Montgomery, Alabama. As a result of the mass shooting, Tuskegee decided to end its open campus policy.

=== Tuskegee Institute National Historic Site ===
- Tuskegee Institute National Historic Site
- U.S. National Register of Historic Places
- U.S. National Historic Landmark
- Location within Alabama Location within the United States
- Nearest city: Tuskegee, Alabama
- Coordinates: 32°25′49″N 85°42′28″W
- Area: 57.92 acres (0.2344 km^{2})
- Built: 1882
- Architect: Robert Robinson Taylor
- Architectural style: Greek Revival, Queen Anne
- Visitation: 8,659 (2025)
- Website: Tuskegee Institute National Historic Site
- NRHP reference No.: 66000151

Significant dates
- Added to NRHP: October 15, 1966
- Designated NHL: June 23, 1965

In 1965 Tuskegee University was declared a National Historic Landmark for the significance of its academic programs, its role in higher education for African-Americans, and its status in United States history. Congress authorized the establishment of the Tuskegee Institute National Historic Site in 1974.

The National Historic Site includes Booker T. Washington's home (The Oaks) and the George Washington Carver Museum. The historic landmark district includes the entire Tuskegee University campus of the time. "Points of special historic interest" noted in the landmark description include:

- The Oaks (Washington's Home)
- Booker T. Washington monument, Lifting the Veil of Ignorance, by Charles Keck
- Grave of Booker T. Washington
- Grave of George Washington Carver
- The George Washington Carver Museum

The Tuskegee Airmen National Historic Site is at Moton Field, in Tuskegee, Alabama.

=== Presidents ===
Tuskegee has had 10 presidents and 2 interim presidents since its founding in 1881. Matthew Jenkins was the only interim president to not later become a president.

1. Booker T. Washington (1881–1915), the founding president
2. Robert Russa Moton (1915–1935), help established the Tuskegee Veterans’ Administration Hospital
3. Frederick Douglass Patterson (1935–1953), created the first veterinary medicine program at Historically Black College and University
4. Luther Hilton Foster Jr. (1953–1981)
5. Benjamin Franklin Payton (1981–2010)
6. Gilbert L. Rochon (2010–2013)
7. Brian L. Johnson (2014–2017)
8. Lily D. McNair (2018–2021), the first female president
9. Charlotte P. Morris (2021–2024), (2010, 2017–2018)
10. Mark A. Brown (2024–present), the first alum to be president

Presidents of Tuskegee University
Booker T. Washington	1881–1915
Robert Russa Moton	1915–1935
Frederick Douglass Patterson	1935–1953
Luther H. Foster Jr.	1953–1981
Benjamin F. Payton	1981–2010
Gilbert L. Rochon	2010–2013
Brian L. Johnson	2014–2017
Lily McNair	2018–2021
Charlotte P. Morris	2021 (effective August 1)

== Campus ==
Lifting the Veil of Ignorance, a statue of Booker T. Washington that was designed by sculptor Charles Keck and unveiled on April 5, 1922. The statue depicts Dr. Washington lifting the veil of ignorance off his people, who had once been enslaved, by showing them the ways of a better life through education and skills.

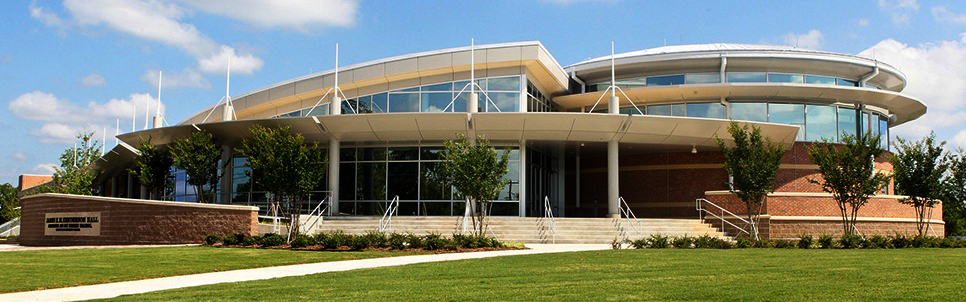
James Henry Meriwether Henderson Hall is Tuskegee University's new Agricultural Life Science Teaching, Extension and Research Building. Henderson Hall provides labs for teaching introductory courses in animal, plant, soil, and environmental sciences as well as biology and chemistry.

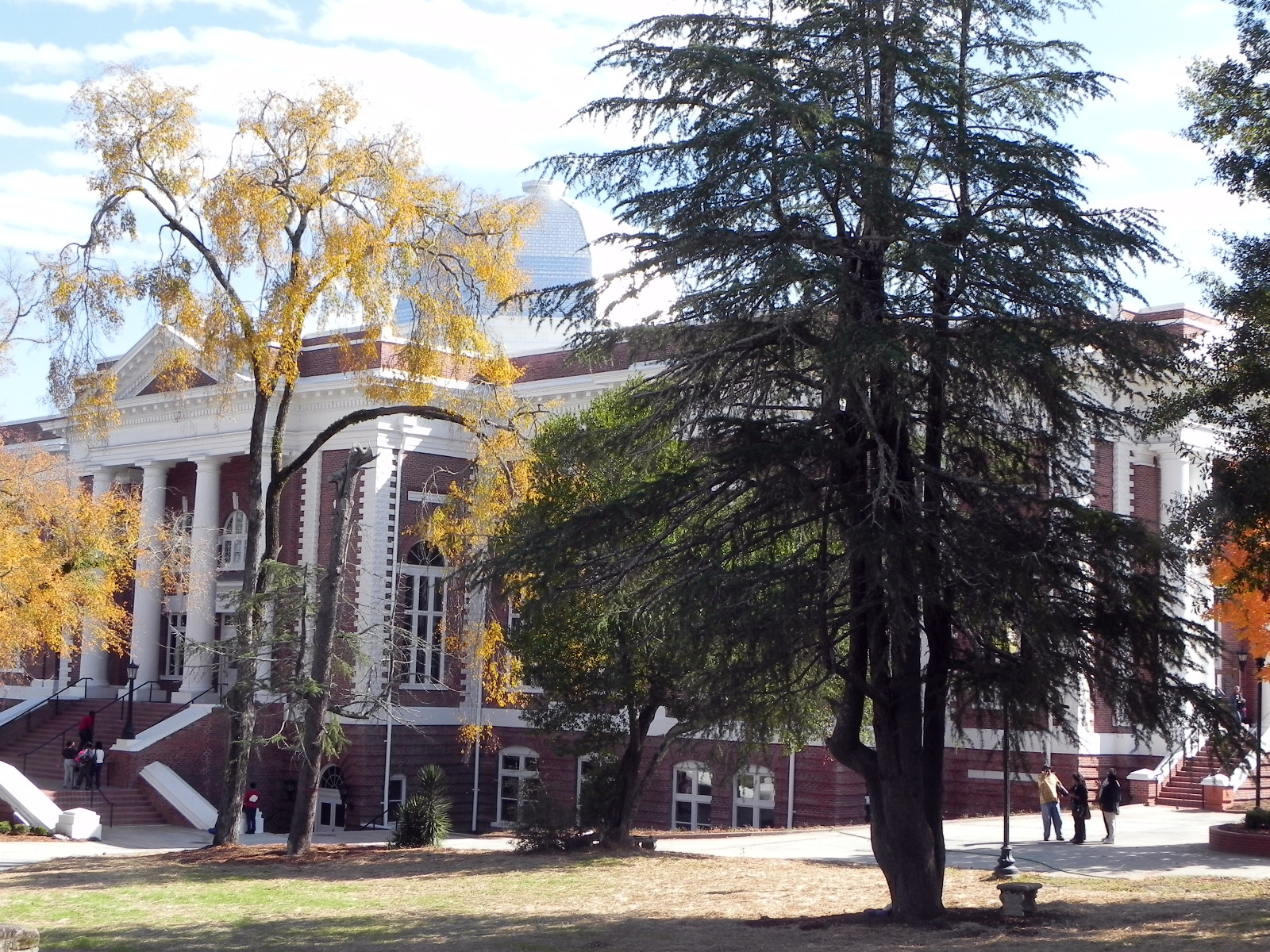
Built in 1906 and completely renovated in 2013, Tompkins Hall serves as the primary student dining facility and student center. The building includes a ballroom, an auditorium, a game room, a retail restaurant, and a 24-hour student study with healthy food vending machines. It is home to the offices of the Student Government Association.

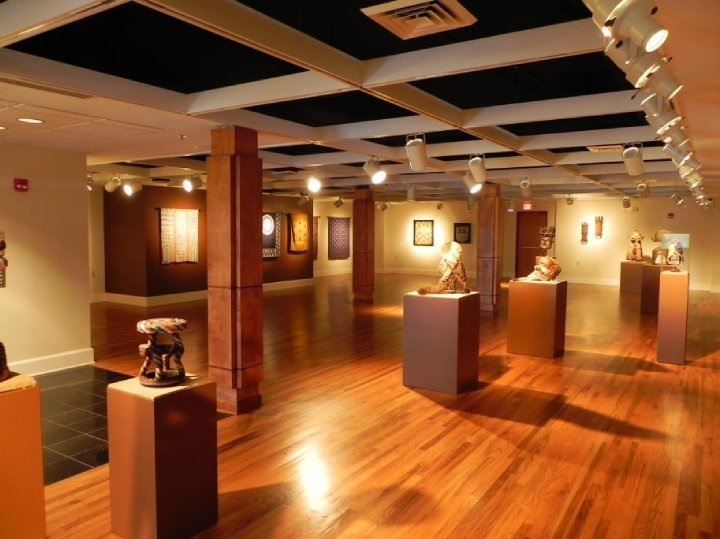
The Legacy Museum houses: The African collection (contains approximately 900 items), the antiques and miscellaneous items collection and The Lovette W. Harper Collection of African Art. Third Floor exhibition contains "The United States Public Health Service Untreated Syphilis Study in the Negro Male, Macon County, Alabama 1932-1972."

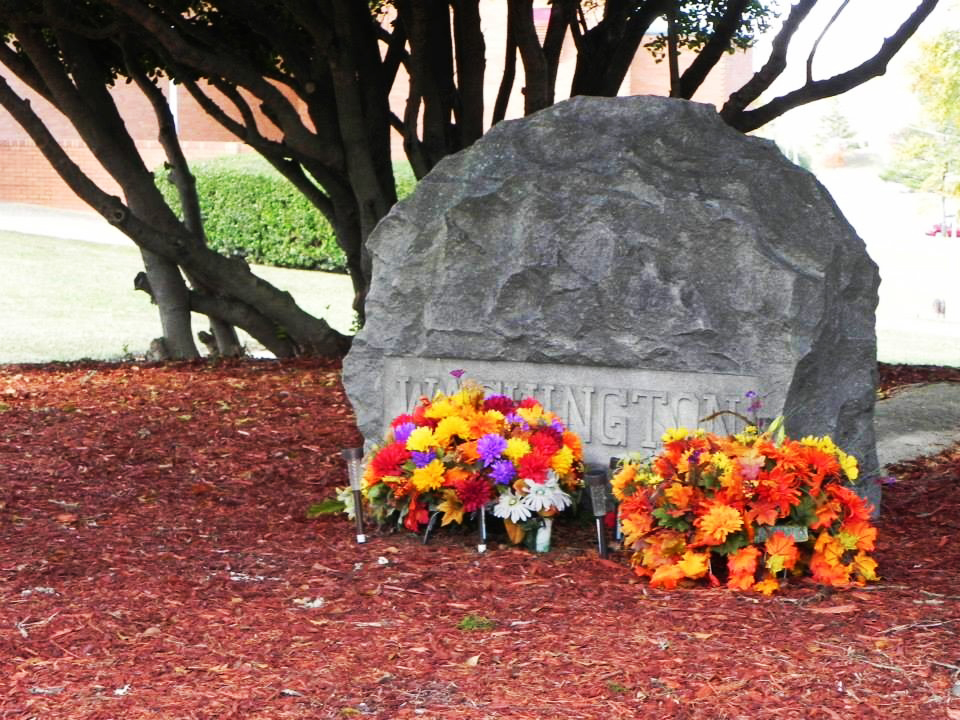
Booker T. Washington is laid to rest in the Tuskegee University Campus Cemetery. Many other notable university people are interred on the Tuskegee campus including: George Washington Carver, Cleveland L. Abbott, William L. Dawson, Luther Hilton Foster (4th president), Frederick D. Patterson (3rd president), many other Washington family members and others.

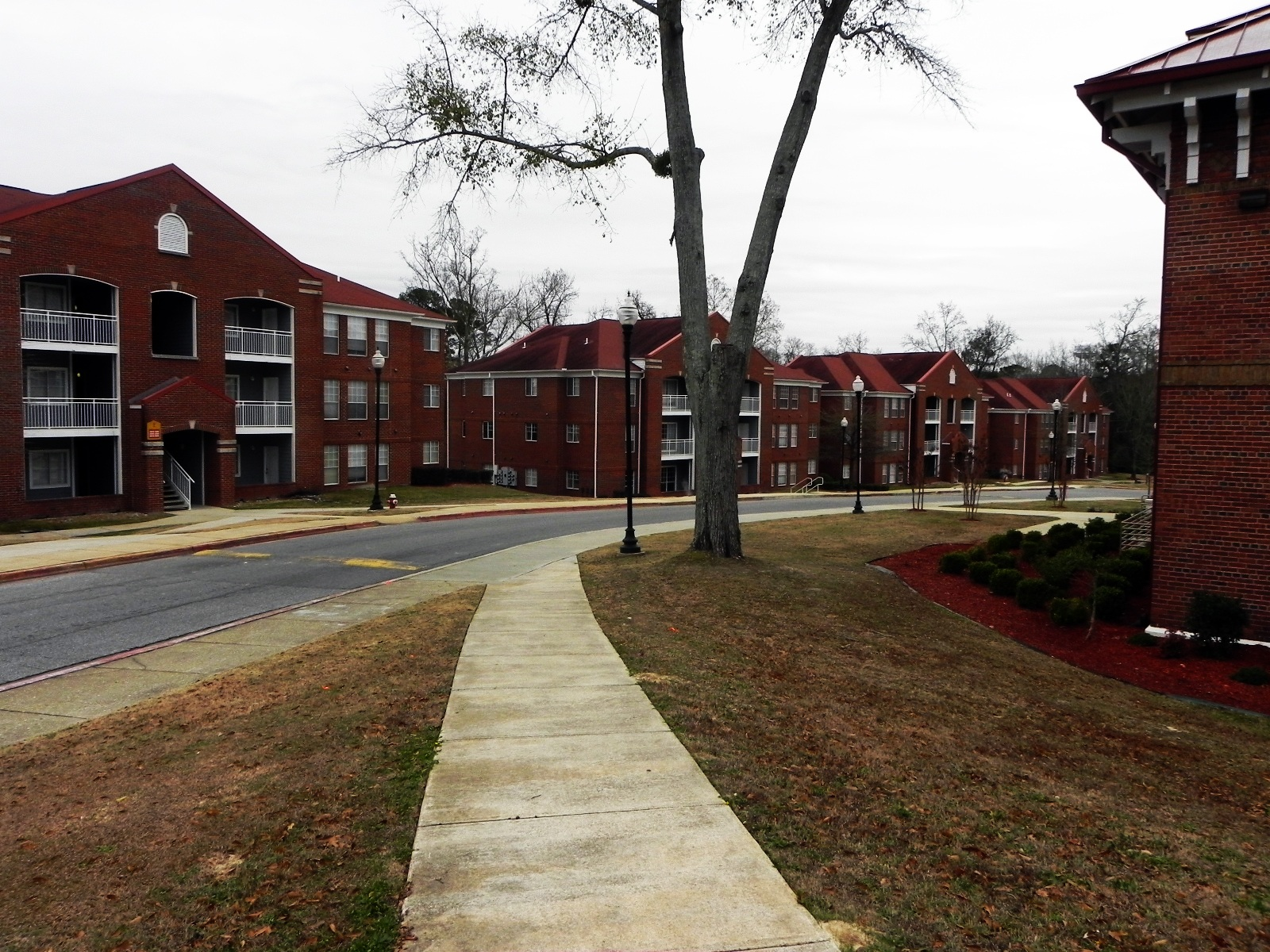
Tuskegee University provides on-campus apartment style living for students in the Commons Apartments located across the campus in three different locations

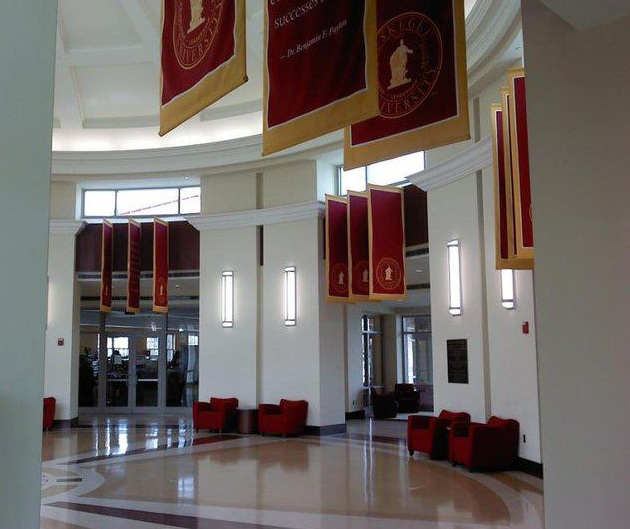
Margaret Murray Washington Hall is home to Office of Admission, University Bookstore and additional dining services for the students

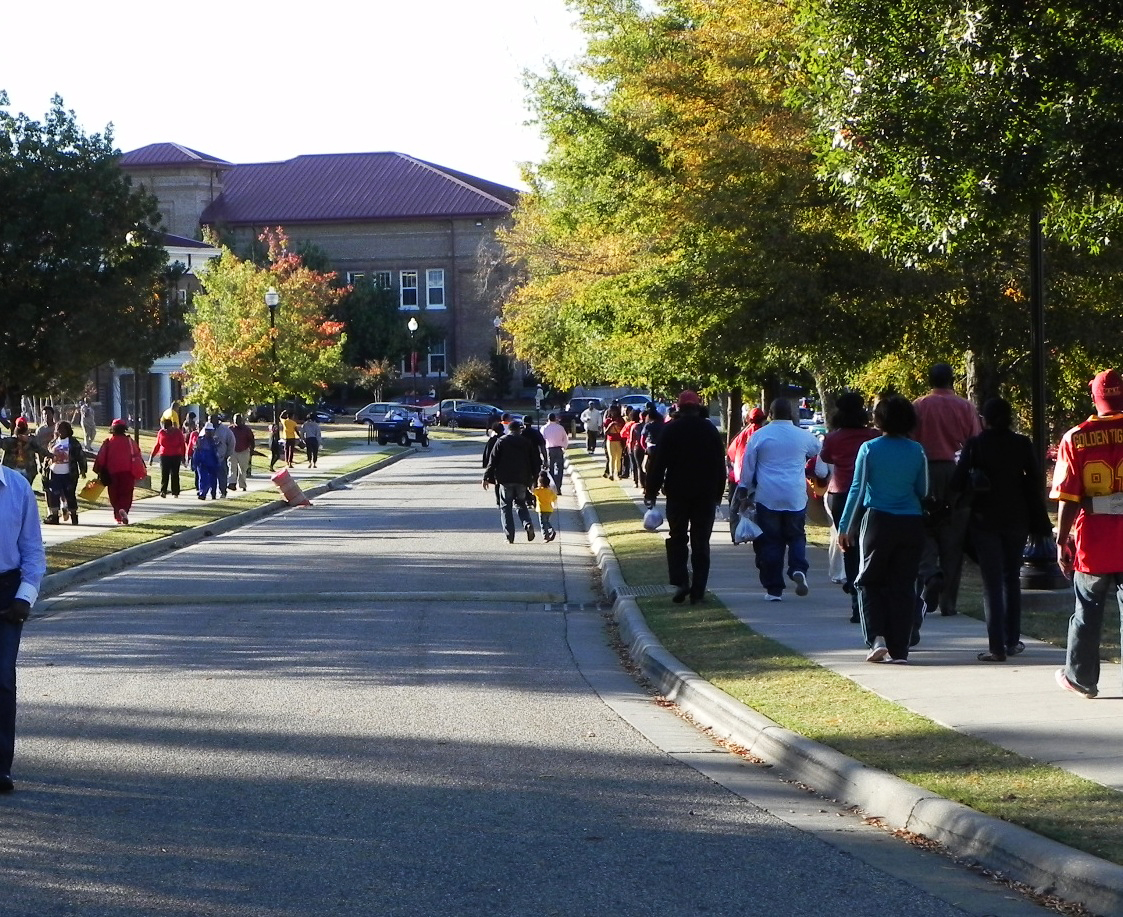
"The Avenue" is one of the main pedestrian corridors on campus that is rarely open to vehicular traffic

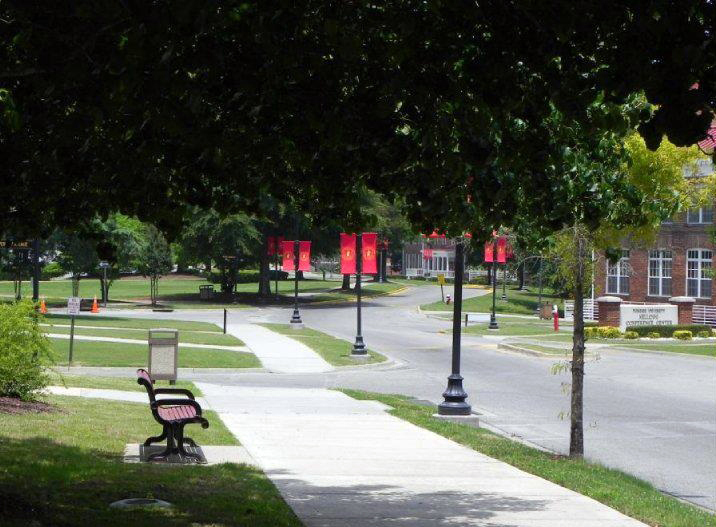
Booker T. Washington Boulevard is the main drive into the campus of Tuskegee University

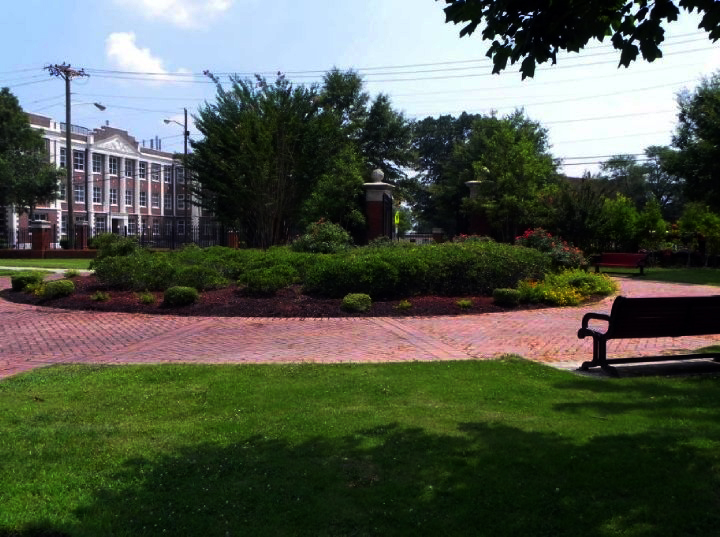
Tuskegee University's campus has a park like setting and features many large green areas

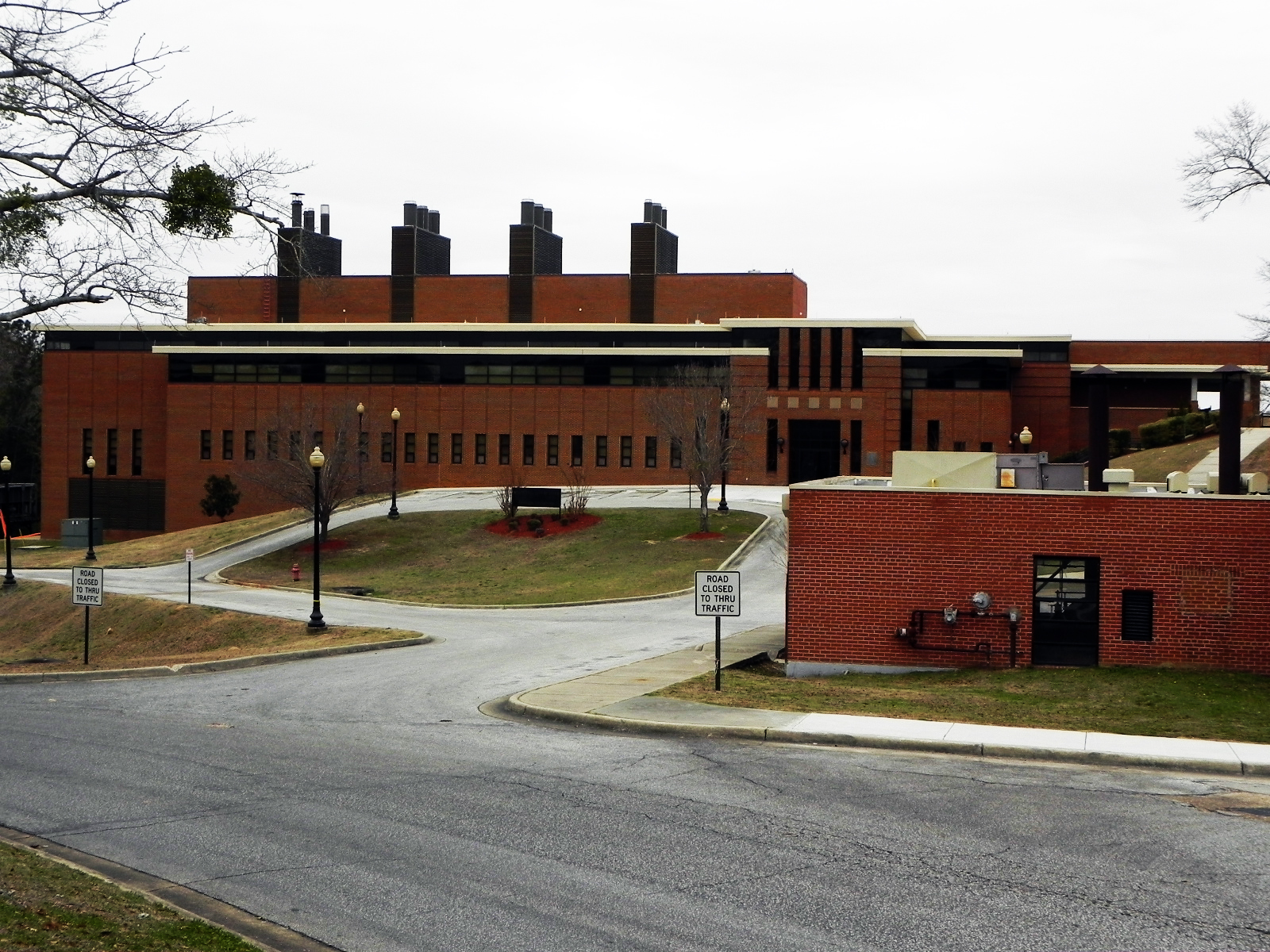
College of Veterinary Medicine Williams Bowie Hall

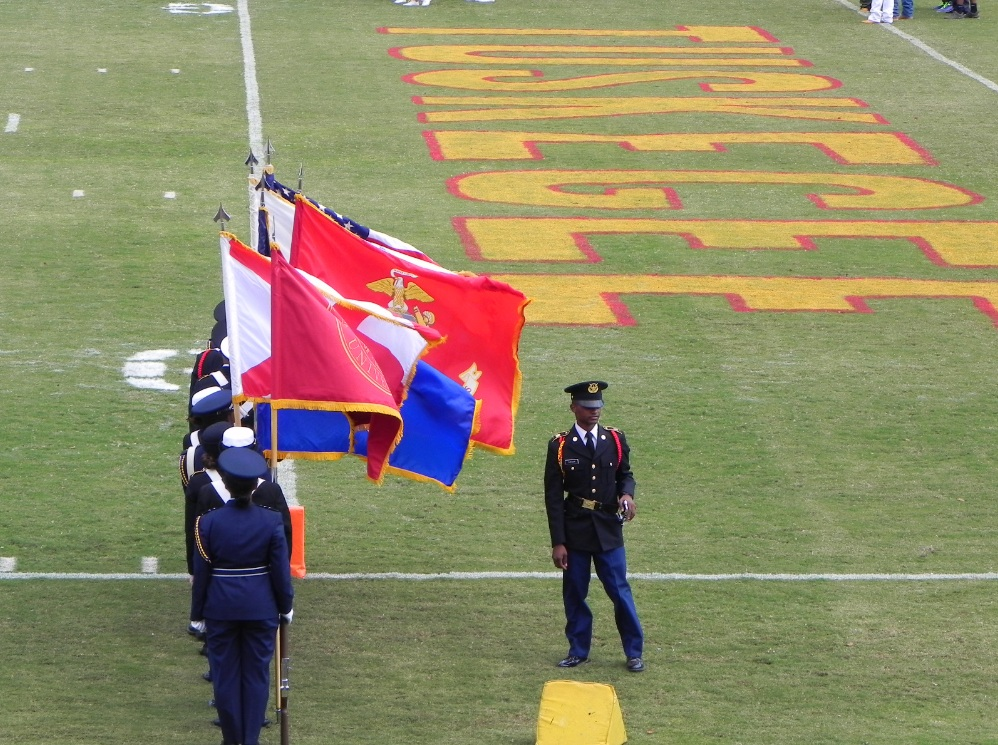
Tuskegee football game

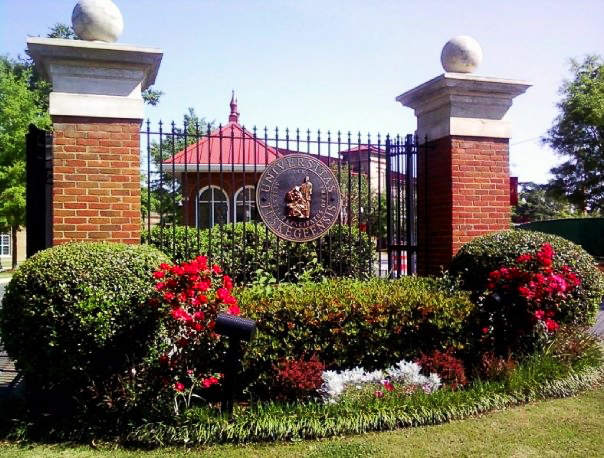
Main entrance to the campus

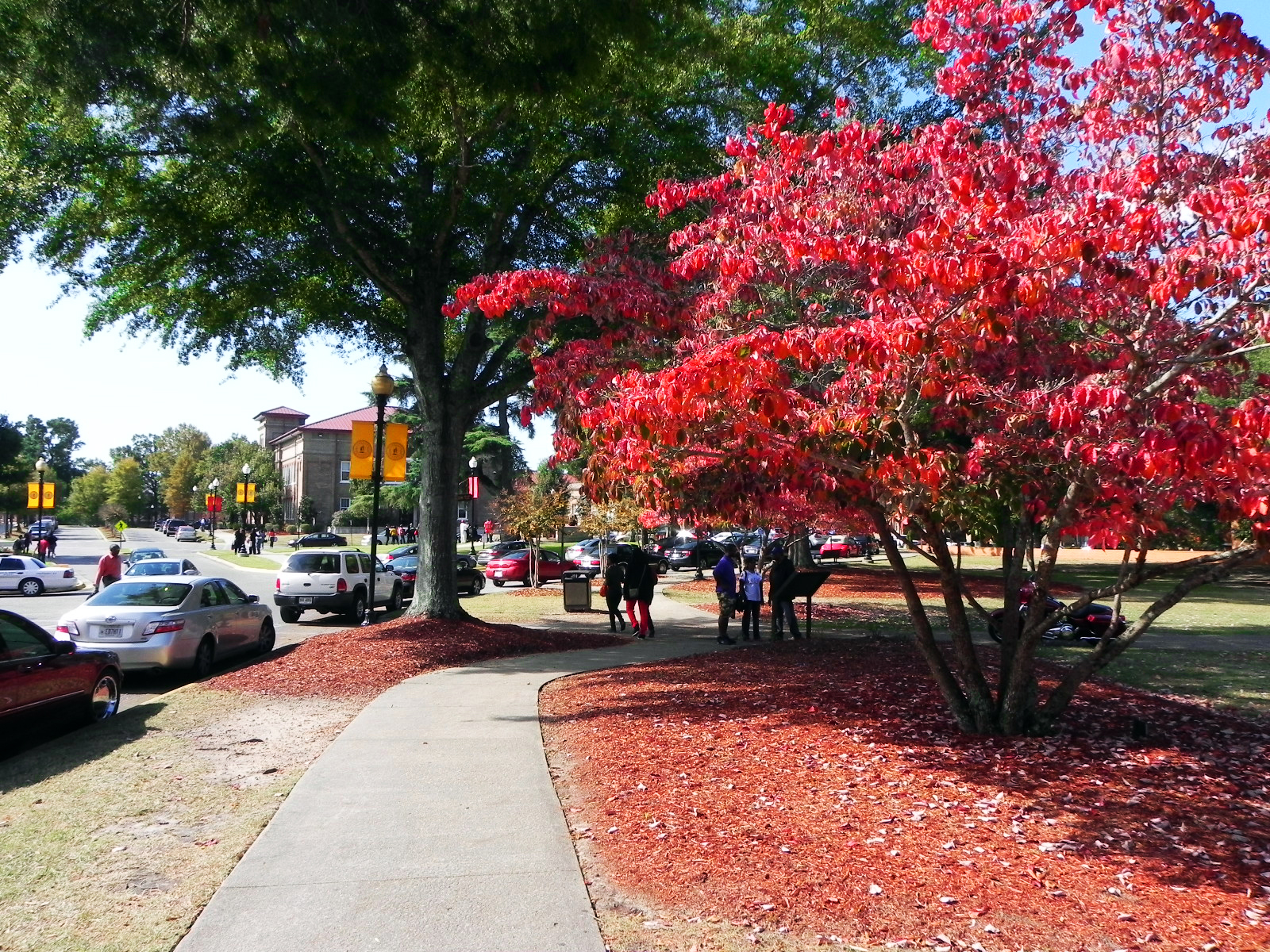
A scenic campus corridor

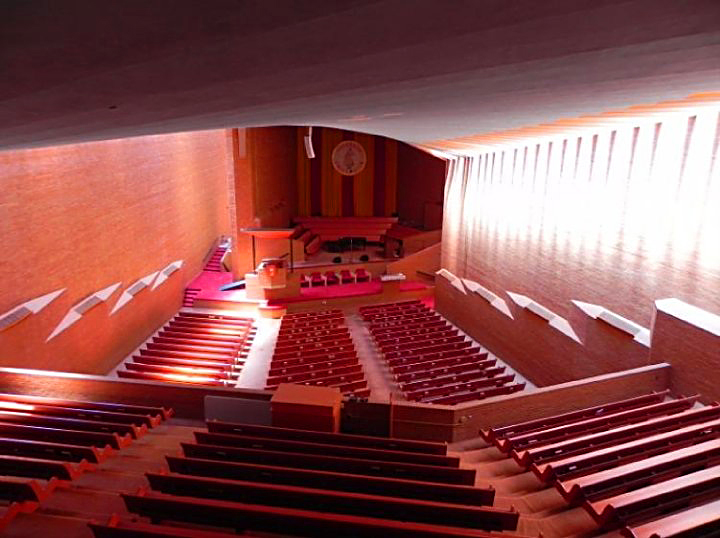
Interior view of the Tuskegee Chapel

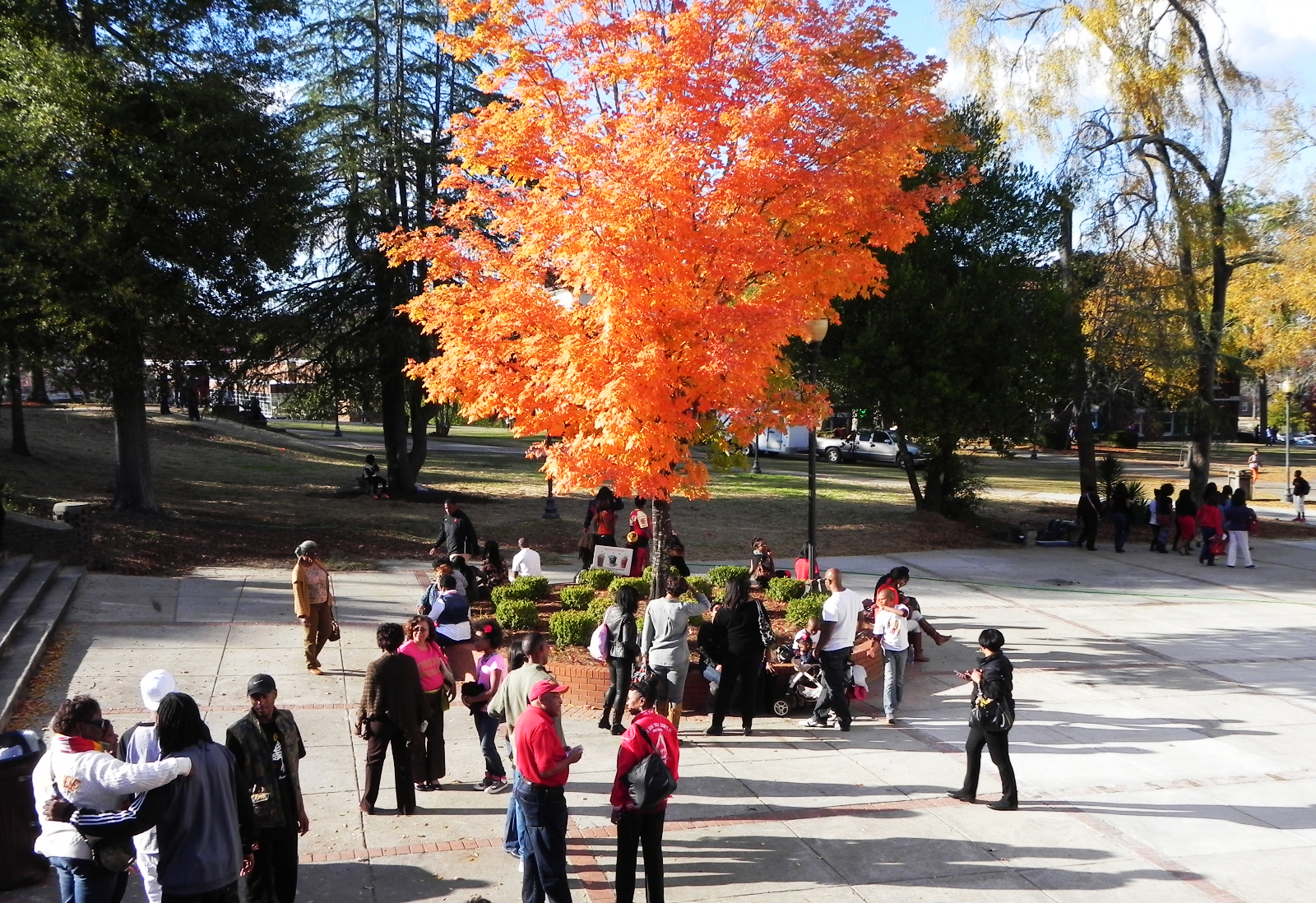
Fall at Tuskegee University

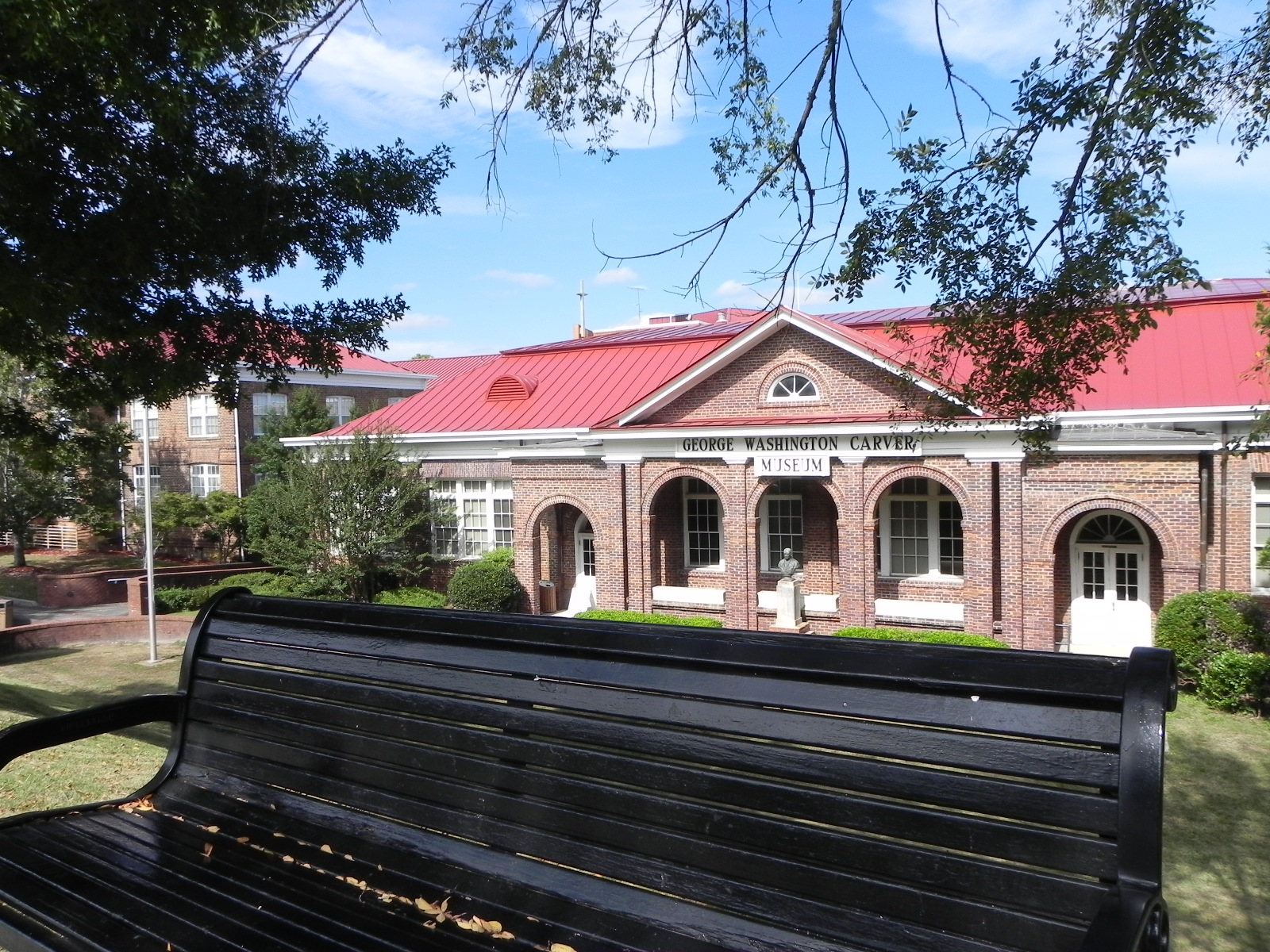
George Washington Carver Museum

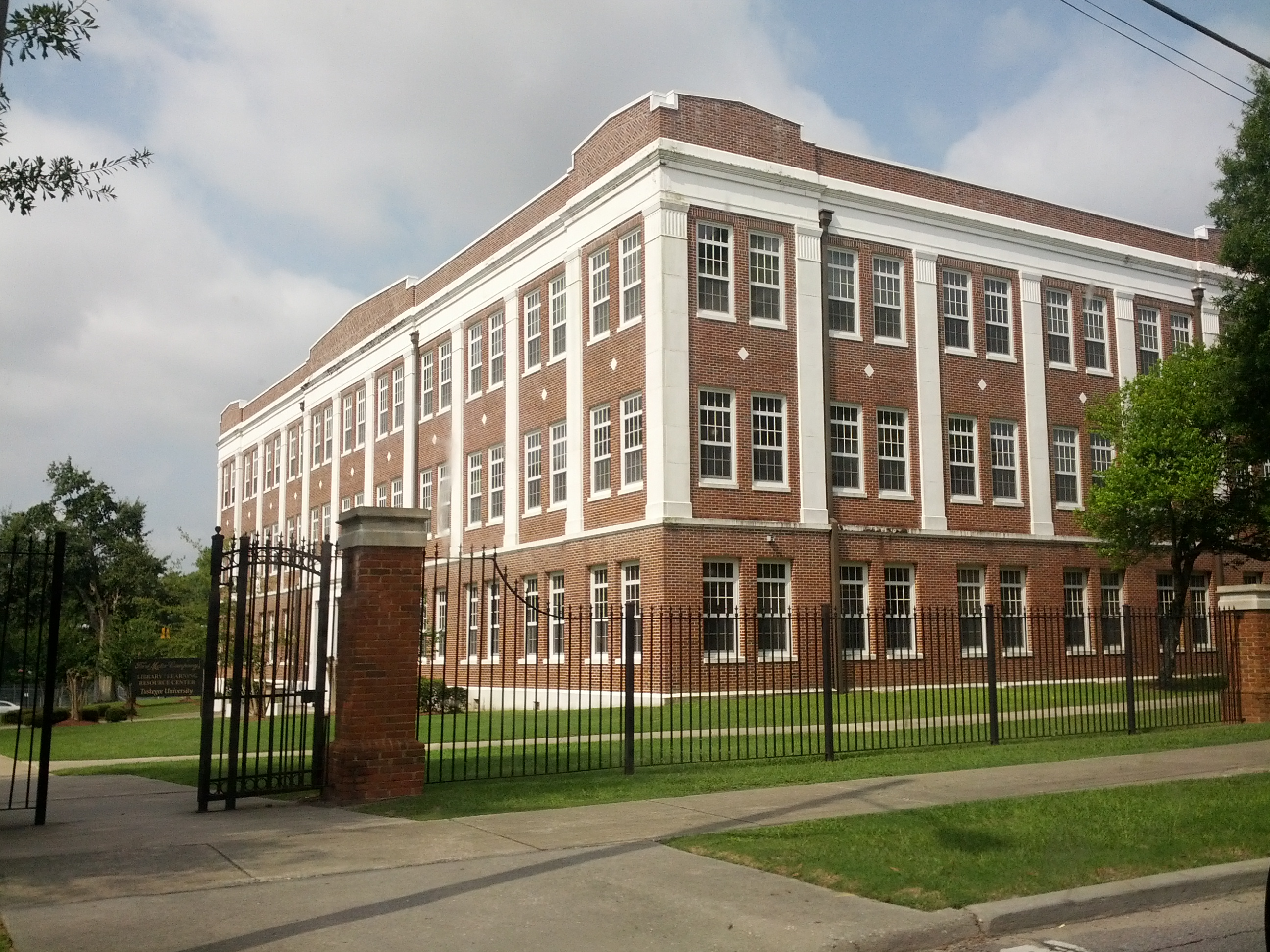
The Main Library, Hollis Burke Frissell now known as the Ford Motor Company Library/Learning Resource Center

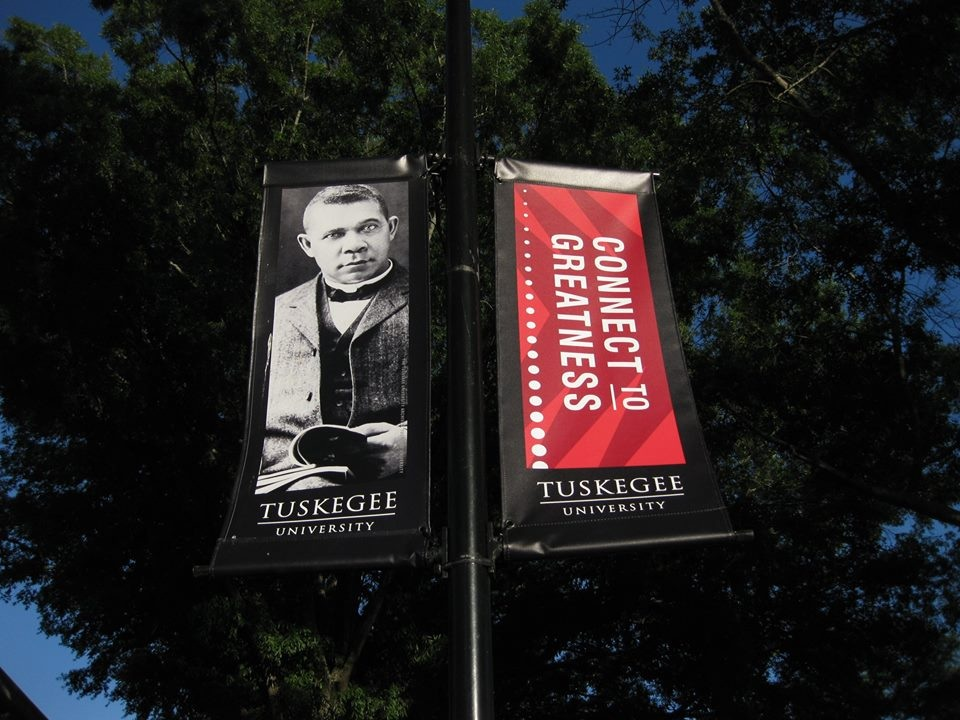
Campus banners

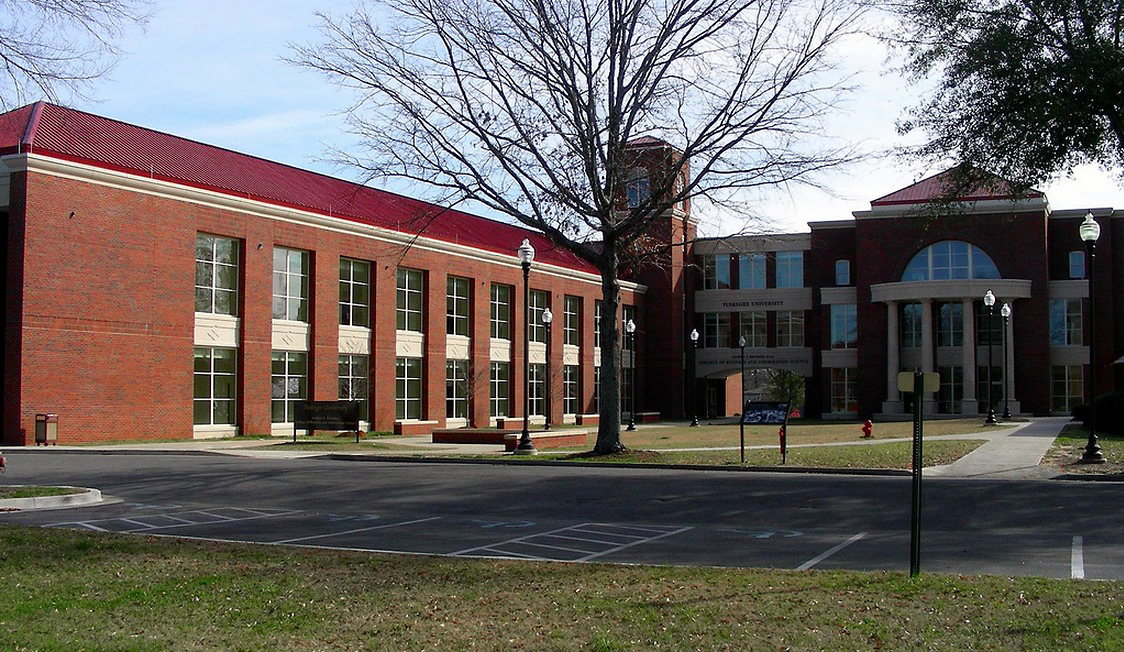
Andrew F. Brimmer College of Business and Information Sciences

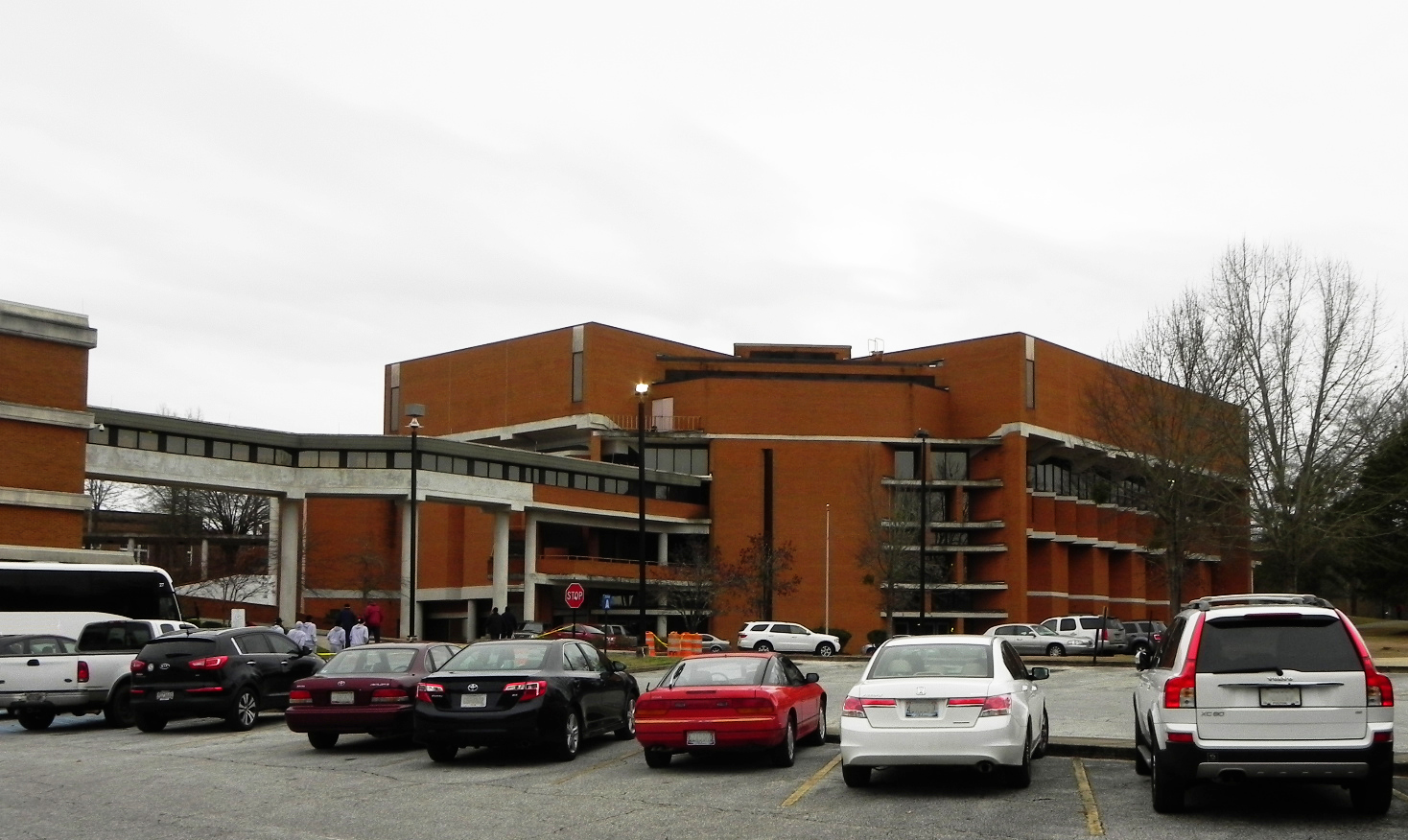
Daniel "Chappie" James Center

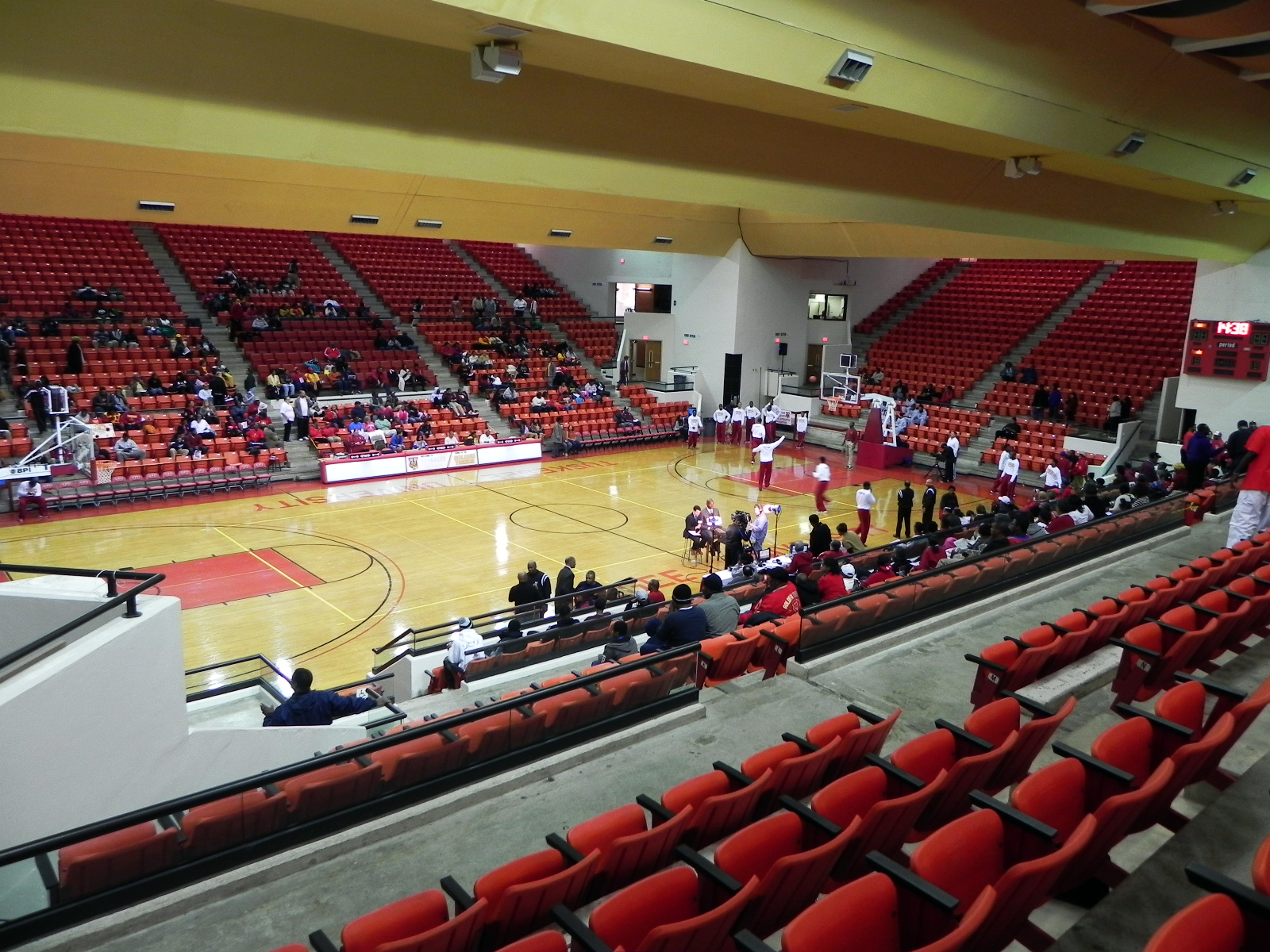
Daniel "Chappie" James Center -Tuskegee basketball pre-game warm-up

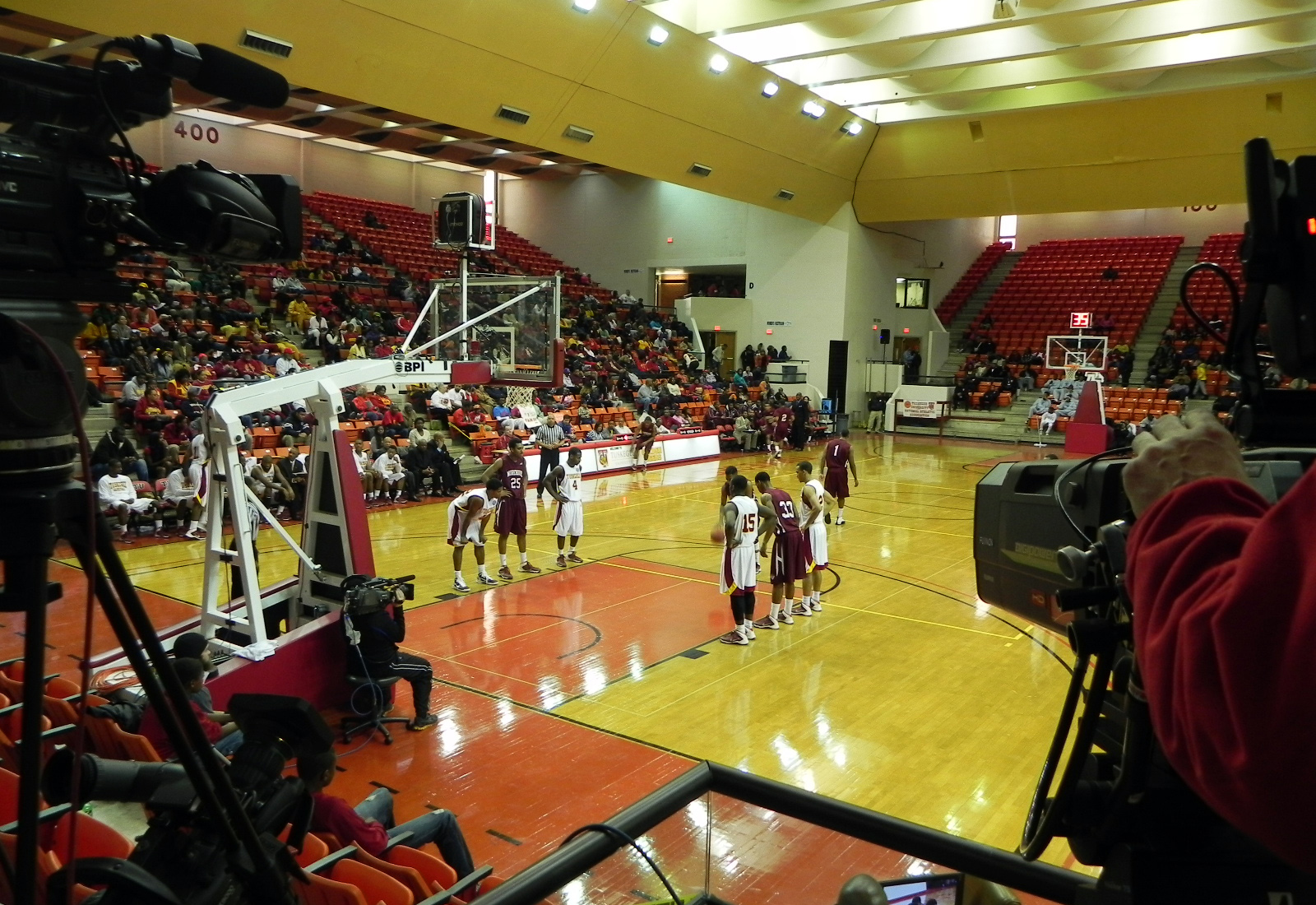
Daniel "Chappie" James Center basketball game

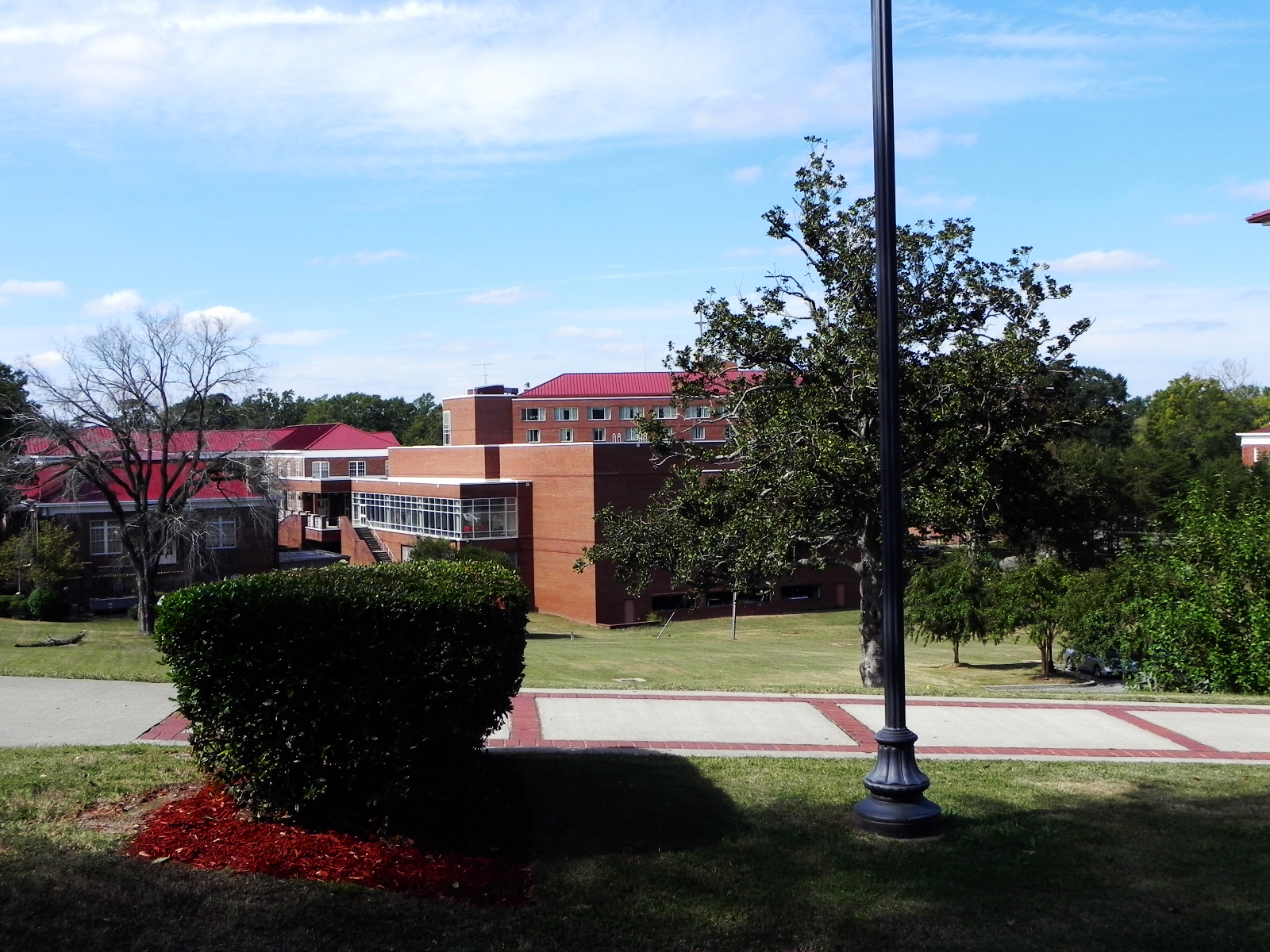
Tuskegee University campus partial view of the "Valley" and the Kellogg Hotel & Conference Center

=== Kellogg Hotel & Conference Center ===
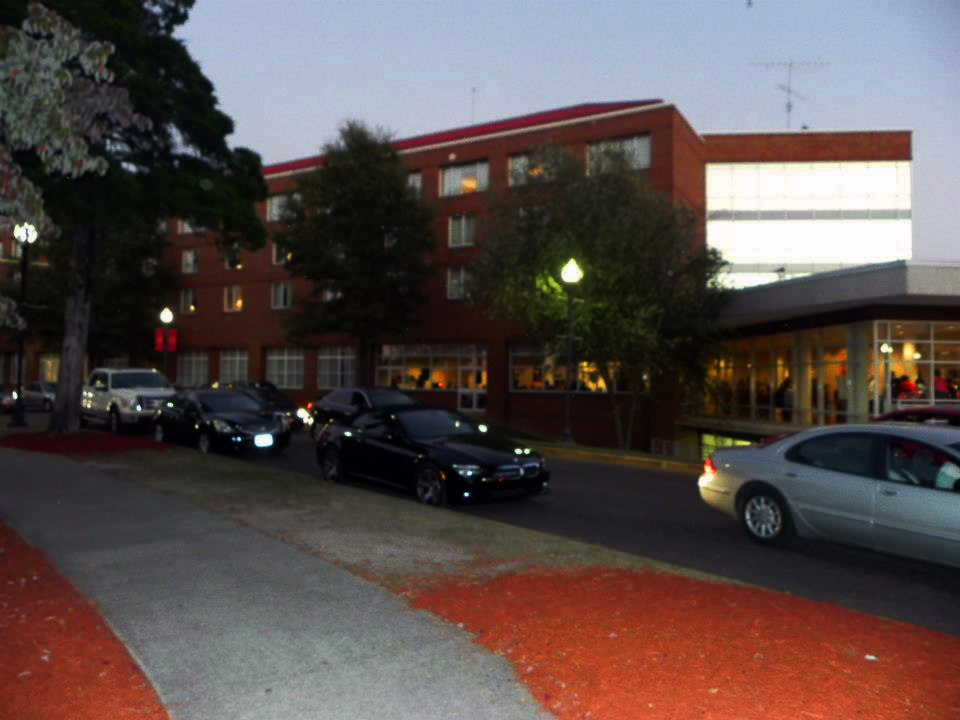
The Tuskegee University Kellogg Hotel & Conference Center

The Kellogg Hotel & Conference Center at the renovated Dorothy Hall (built 1901) was established in 1994 on the campus of Tuskegee University by the W.K. Kellogg Foundation. The Kellogg Conference Center offers multimedia meeting rooms, as well as a 300-seat auditorium and a ballroom that accommodates up to 350 guests. Students studying Hospitality Management within the Andrew F. Brimmer College of Business and Information Science & Dietetics students within the Department of Food and Nutrition Science are able to receive hands on experience at the Kellogg Hotel & Conference Center. The Kellogg Hotel & Conference Center is the only center at a historically black university; there are only 11 worldwide. Other Kellogg Conference Centers in the United States are located at: Michigan State University, Gallaudet University and the California State Polytechnic University, Pomona (Cal Poly Pomona).

== Academics ==
Undergraduate demographics as of Fall 2023
Race and ethnicity	Total
Black	92%
Two or more races	4%
Unknown	3%
White	1%
Economic diversity
Low-income (Note: The percentage of students who received an income-based federal Pell grant intended for low-income students.)	53%
Affluent (Note: The percentage of students who are a part of the American middle class at the bare minimum.)	47%

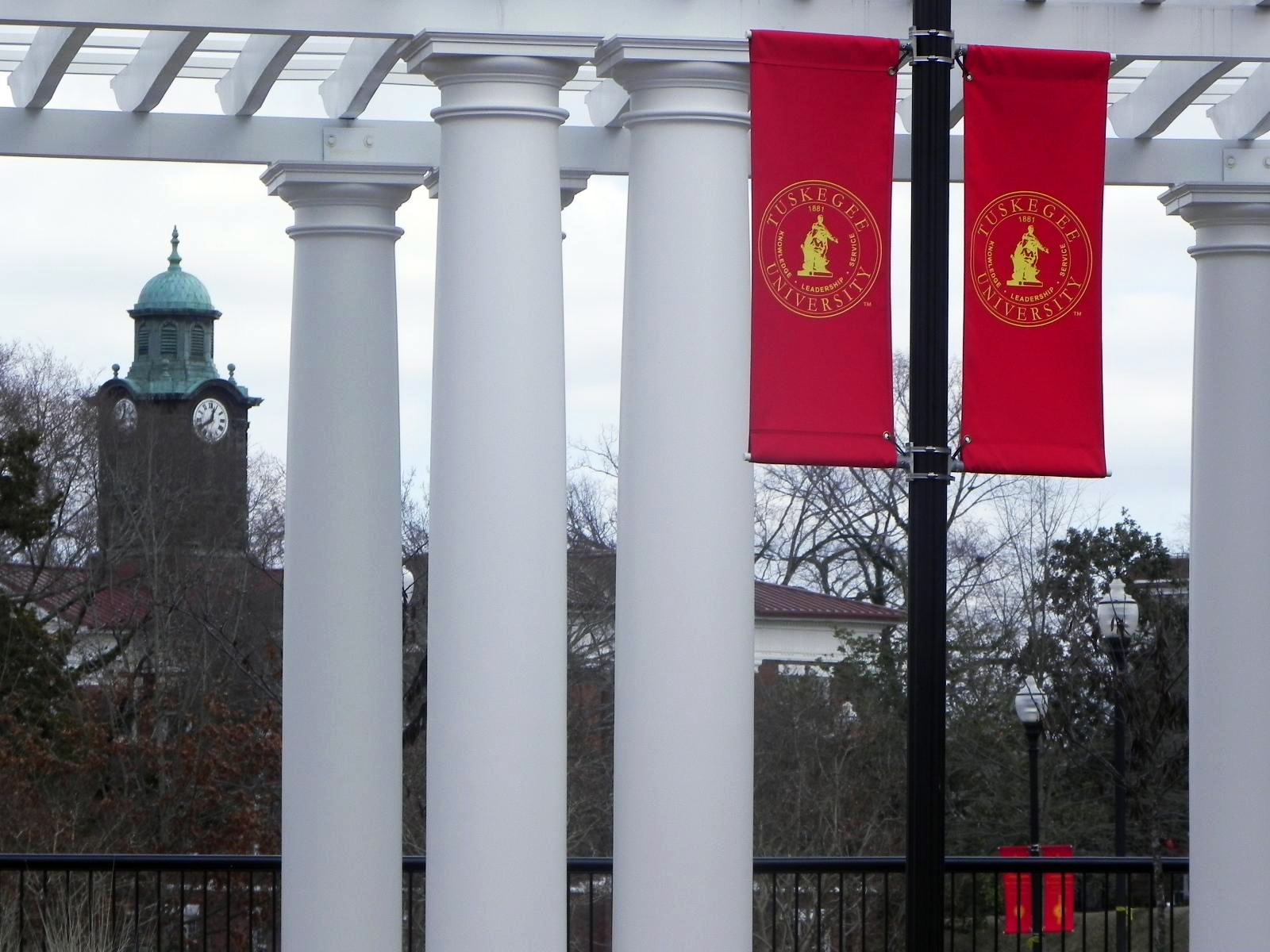
White Hall bell tower

The academic programs are organized into five colleges and two schools: (1) The College of Agriculture, Environment and Nutrition Sciences; (2) The College of Arts and Sciences; (3) The Brimmer College of Business and Information Science; (4) The College of Engineering; (5) The College of Veterinary Medicine, Nursing and Allied Health; (6), The Taylor School of Architecture and Construction Science; and (7) The School of Education.

Tuskegee houses an undergraduate honors program for qualified rising sophomores with at least a cumulative 3.2 GPA.

Tuskegee University is accredited by the Southern Association of Colleges and Schools Commission on Colleges to award Baccalaureate, Master's, Doctorate, and professional degrees. The following academic programs are accredited by national agencies: Architecture, Business, Education, Engineering, Clinical Laboratory Sciences, Nursing, Occupational Therapy, Social Work, and Veterinary Medicine.

Tuskegee University is the only Historically Black University to offer the Doctor of Veterinary Medicine (D.V.M.); its School of Veterinary Medicine was established in 1944. The school is fully accredited by the Council on Education of the American Veterinary Medical Association (AVMA). About 75% of the nation's African-American veterinarians graduated from Tuskegee's program.

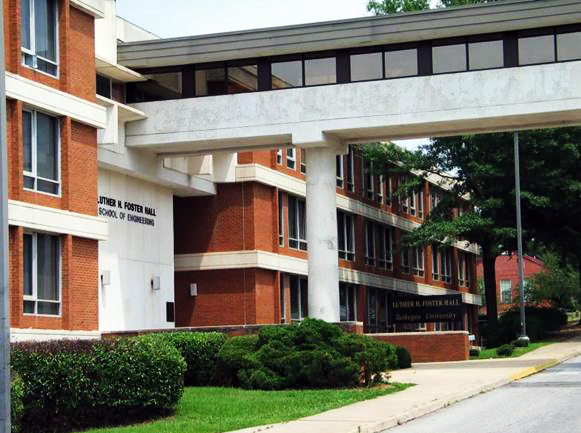
Luther H. Foster Hall, College of Engineering

Tuskegee University offers several engineering degree programs all with ABET accreditation. The Aerospace Science Engineering department was established in 1983. Tuskegee University is the first and only Historically Black University to offer an accredited B.S. degree in Aerospace Engineering. The Mechanical Engineering Department was established in 1954 and the Chemical Engineering Department began in 1977; The Department of Electrical Engineering is the largest of five departments within the College of Engineering. The program is accredited by EAC/ABET (Engineering Accreditation Commission/Accreditation Board of Engineering and Technology) and the Southern Association of Colleges and Schools.

The Tuskegee University Andrew F. Brimmer College of Business and Information Science is fully accredited by the Association to Advance Collegiate Schools of Business (AACSB-International).

The school of Nursing was established as the Tuskegee Institute Training School of Nurses and registered with the Alabama State board of Nursing, September 1892 under the auspices of the John A. Andrew Memorial Hospital. In 1948 the university began its baccalaureate program in Nursing; becoming the first nursing program in the state of Alabama. The Nursing department holds full accreditation from the National League for Nursing Accrediting Commission and is approved by the Alabama State Board of Nursing.

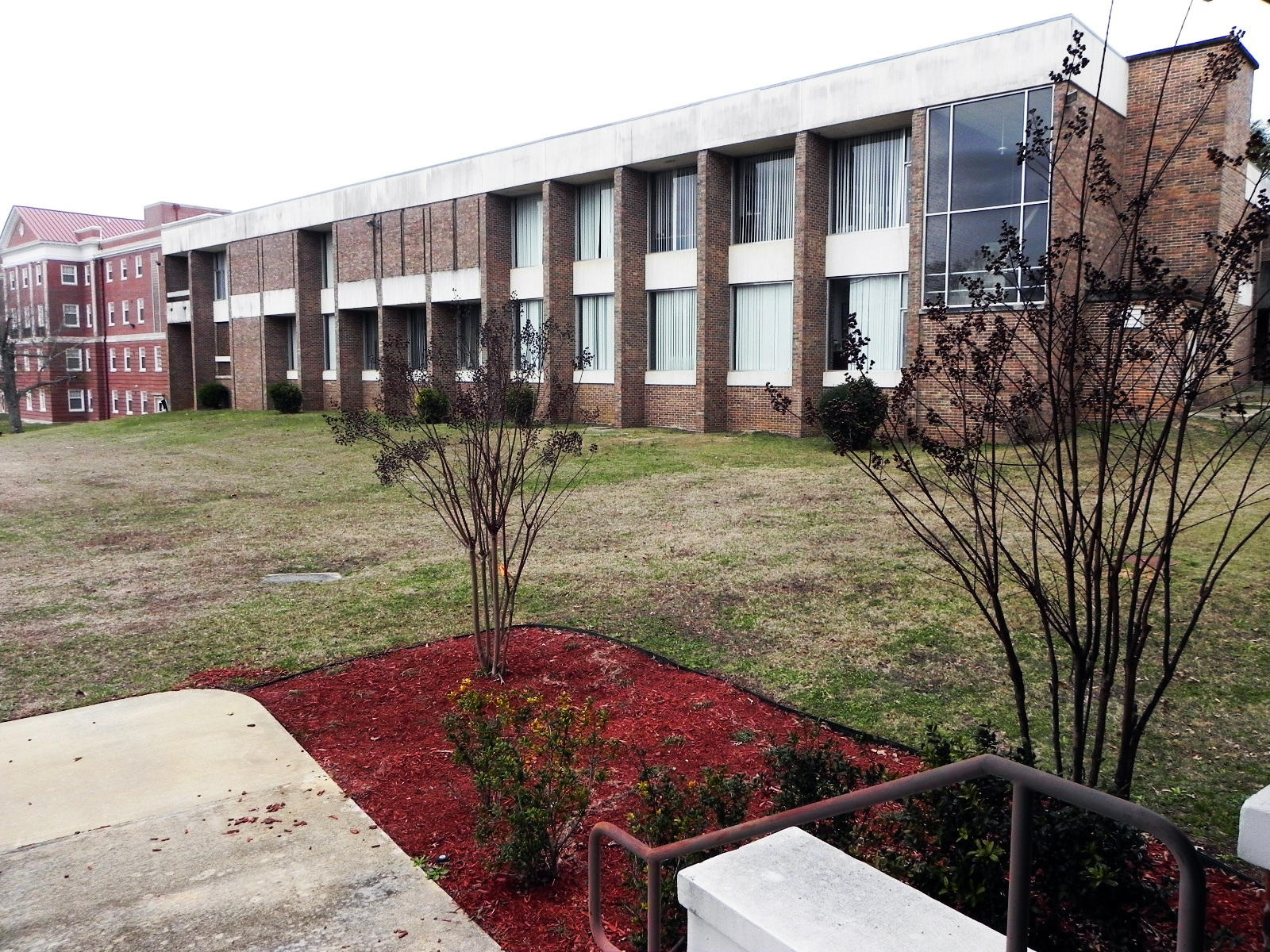
Basil O'Connor Hall houses the School of Nursing, the first baccalaureate Nursing program in Alabama.

The Occupational Therapy program is accredited by the Accreditation Council for Occupational Therapy Education (ACOTE) of the American Occupational Therapy Association. The Clinical Laboratory Science Program is accredited by the National Accrediting Agency for Clinical Laboratory Sciences. (NAACLS)

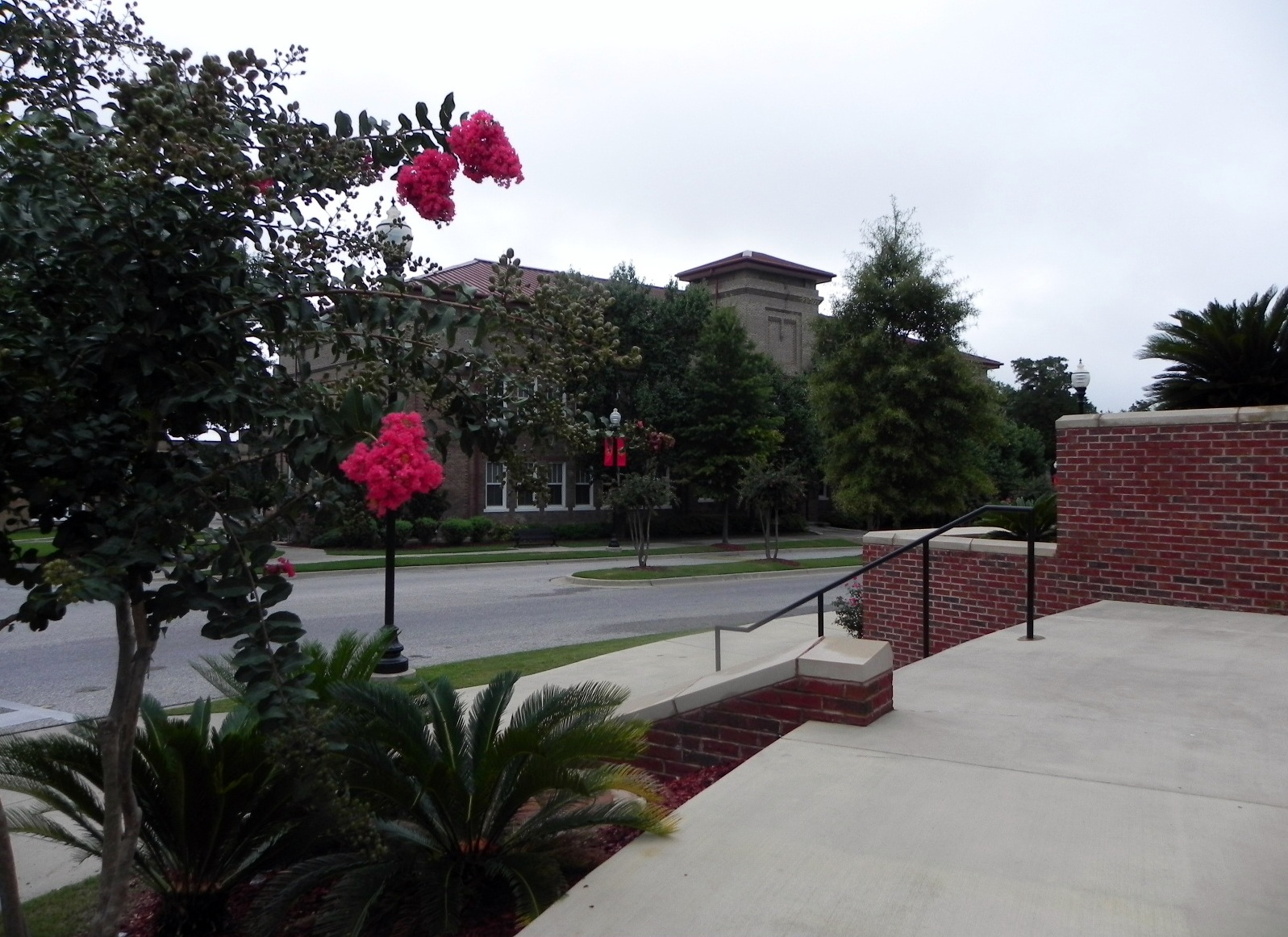
Robert R. Taylor School of Architecture and Construction Science

Tuskegee University began offering certificates in Architecture under the Division of Mechanical Industries in 1893. The 4-year curriculum in architecture leading to the Bachelor of Science degree was initiated in 1957 and the professional 6-year program in 1965. The Robert R. Taylor School of Architecture offers two professional programs: Architecture, and Construction Science and Management. The 5-year Bachelor of Architecture program is fully accredited by the National Architectural Accrediting Board (NAAB). Graduates of the program are qualified to become registered architects.

In 2019, Tuskegee signed a partnership with the Ross University School of Medicine to help redress diversity shortages in the medical field. Qualified Tuskegee students will automatically gain admissions into the medical school with a tuition-free first semester.

In 2020, Tuskegee established a strategic partnership with the Cumberland School of Law that will allow Tuskegee students to receive a bachelor's degree and Juris Doctor degree in six years as opposed to the traditional seven.

=== Reputation and rankings ===
U.S. News & World Report places Tuskegee 3rd out of 79 Historically Black Colleges and Universities in their 2022 rankings. U.S. News & World Report also rated Tuskegee 20th "Best Regional College in the South" for 2021 out of 134 schools evaluated. Tuskegee is ranked 109th among 614 master's universities (which award a significant number of master's degrees but few or no doctoral degrees) in the U.S. according to the Washington Monthly 2020 rankings, which rate schools' contribution to the public good as measured by social mobility, research, and promoting public service.

=== National Center for Bioethics in Research and Health Care ===
National Center for Bioethics in Research and Health Care is the nation's first bioethics center devoted to engaging the sciences, humanities, law and religious faiths in the exploration of the core moral issues which underlie research and medical treatment of African Americans and other under-served people. The official launching of the Center took place two years after President Bill Clinton's apology to the nation, the survivors of the Syphilis Study, Tuskegee University, and Tuskegee/Macon County, Alabama for the U.S. Public Health Service medical experiment (1932–1972), where 399 poor—and mostly illiterate—African American sharecroppers became part of a study on non-treating and natural history of syphilis. The center houses the Bioethics Honors Program available to undergraduate students interested in bioethics.

== Athletics ==
Tuskegee is a member of the National Collegiate Athletic Association (NCAA) Division II and competes within the Southern Intercollegiate Athletic Conference (SIAC). The university has a total of 12 varsity sports teams, six men's teams called the "Golden Tigers", and six women's teams called the "Tigerettes". In Fall 2026, Tuskegee University added men's and women's soccer teams.

Tuskegee's Men's Basketball won the 2014 SIAC Championship and the 2014 NCAA Division South Region Championship. The Golden Tigers also made it to the Elite Eight during the 2014 NCAA Men's Division II basketball tournament. Tuskegee's Women's Softball won the 2014 SIAC Championship.

The Tuskegee Department of Athletics sponsors the following sports:

Men's athletic teams

- Baseball
- Basketball
- Track and Field/Cross Country
- Football
- Tennis
- Soccer

Women's athletic teams

- Basketball
- Track and Field/Cross Country
- Softball
- Tennis
- Volleyball
- Soccer

=== Football ===
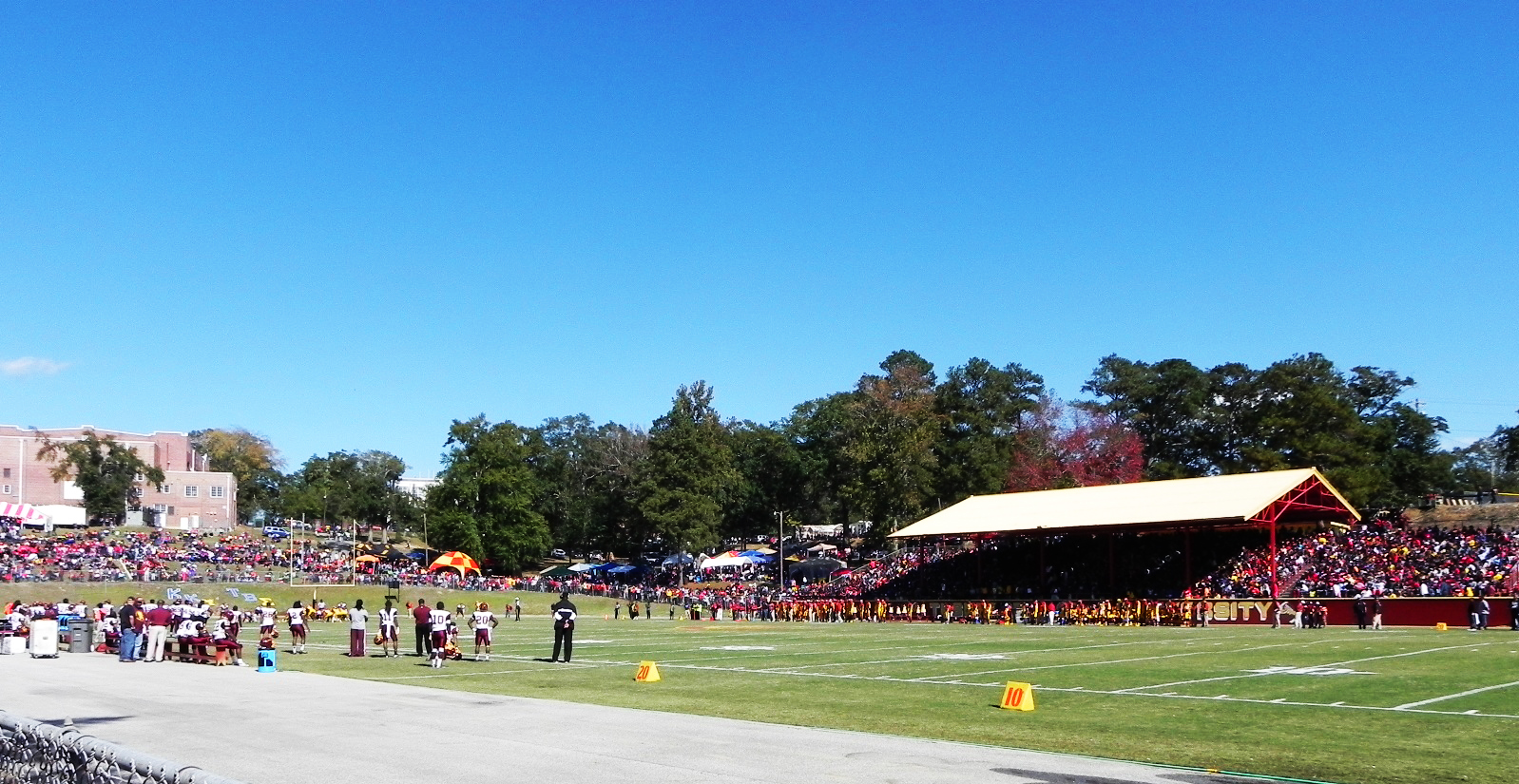
Tuskegee University's historic Cleveland Leigh Abbott Memorial Alumni Stadium, completed 1924. The stadium was the first of its kind to be built at any HBCU in the south.

The Tuskegee University football team has won 29 SIAC championships (the most in SIAC history). As of 2013 the Golden Tigers continue to be the most successful HBCU with 652 wins.

In 2013 Tuskegee opted not to renew its contract to face rival Alabama State University (Division I FCS) in the Turkey Day Classic, the oldest black college football classic in the country. Instead, after going 10–2 the Golden Tigers made their first playoff appearance in school history for the 2013 NCAA Division II Football Championship, for which they had qualified in the past but could not participate due to the Turkey Day Classic. Tuskegee competed against the University of North Alabama in the first round of the playoffs, but lost 30–27. Tuskegee won the 2014 SIAC Football Championship and advanced to the first round of the NCAA Division II football playoffs with a loss of 20–17 to University of West Georgia.

=== Baseball ===
The baseball program has won thirteen SIAC championships and has produced several professional players, including big-leaguers Leon Wagner, Ken Howell, Alan Mills and Roy Lee Jackson.

=== Basketball ===
Tuskegee won the 2013–14 SIAC Championship and advanced to the 2014 NCAA Division II men's basketball tournament. Tuskegee won the NCAA Division II South Regional Championship by defeating Delta State University 80–59. The Golden Tigers fell to No. 1-ranked Metro State (Metropolitan State University of Denver), 106–87, in the Elite Eight of the NCAA Division II tournament at Ford Center, in Evansville, Indiana.

=== Track and field ===
Track began (Men and Women) at Tuskegee in 1916. The first Tuskegee Relays and Meet was held on May 7, 1927; it was the oldest African American relay meet.

The Tuskegee women's team won the championship of the Amateur Athletic Union national senior outdoor meet for all athletes 14 times in 1937–1942 and 1944–1951. The team likewise won the AAU national indoor championship four times in 1941, 1945, 1946 and 1948.

Tuskegee's Alice Coachman was the first African American woman to win an Olympic gold medal in any sport, at the 1948 Olympic Games in London. Iram Lewis, a Tuskegee graduate of architecture, is an Olympian relay runner who competed for the Bahamas.

== The Marching Crimson Piper Band ==
The Marching Crimson Piper Band (MCP) is one of the oldest HBCU marching bands in the nation, having been founded in 1883. Since its inception, the band has performed at TU athletic events, nationally televised shows, NFL games, the Honda Battle of the Bands, Mardi Gras parades, and many other notable events. MCP is accompanied by the Crimson Piperettes (danceline) and Twirling Divas.

== Notable faculty and staff ==
Name	Department	Notability	Reference
J. Pius Barbour	Theology (1919–1921)	Executive director of the National Baptist Association, editor of the National Baptist Voice, mentor to Martin Luther King Jr.	
C. M. Battey	Photography (1916–1927)	Photographer who made portraits of many black leaders and shot covers for The Crisis magazine	
George Ruffin Bridgeforth	Agriculture (1902–1918)	Director of agricultural operations and instruction at Tuskegee, first Black graduate from the University of Massachusetts Amherst (1901), feuded with George Washington Carver at Tuskegee	
James Nathan Calloway	Agriculture	Established the Institute's Tuskegee-Togo Cotton Scheme	
Nathaniel Oglesby Calloway	Chemistry	1930 Iowa State University alumni, first African-American to receive PhD	
George Washington Carver		African American scientist, botanist, educator, and inventor whose studies and teaching revolutionized agriculture in the Southern United States	
William V. Chambliss	Agriculture (1890s–1920s)	Planter, dairy farmer, businessperson, teacher	
Samuel E. Courtney	Mathematics (1885–1888)	physician in Boston, founding member of the National Negro Business League, served two terms on the Boston School Committee	
Louis Edwin Fry Sr.	Architecture (1935–1940)	Architect and professor; appointed as the first chair of the architecture department at Tuskegee Institute, a newly formed department	
P. H. Polk	Photography (1933–1938)	Photographer who documented working class African Americans, ex-slaves, and black leaders; also served as the institute's official photographer for four decades.	
William Augustus Hazel	Architecture	Architect, stained glass artist, educator, academic administrator, and civil rights activist	
G. David Houston		Professor of English at Howard University	
General Daniel "Chappie" James		Fighter pilot in the U.S. Air Force, who in 1975 became the first African American to reach the rank of four-star General	
Ruth Logan Roberts	Physical education	Suffragist, YWCA leader on national level, activist for social and women's health issues, and host of a salon in Harlem	
Lamina Sankoh		Early Sierra Leonean nationalist politician who taught at Tuskegee in the late 1920s	
Robert Robinson Taylor	Trades Department	First African American graduate of MIT, architect for most of the Tuskegee campus buildings and founder of trades programs, served as second in command to Tuskegee's founder and first president, Dr. Booker T. Washington	
Andrew P. Torrence		President of Tennessee State University (1968-1974); executive vice president and provost of Tuskegee University (1974-1980)	
Booker T. Washington	Appointed President (1881–1915)	First principal of the university	
Josephine Turpin Washington	Mathematics	1886 Howard University alumni, early writer on civil rights topics	
Deborah Wolfe	Education	1937 New Jersey City University alumni, 1938 and 1945 Columbia University alumni, esteemed educator and minister, Education Chief of the United States House of Representatives Committee on Education and Labor	
Donald F. White	Architecture (1934–1938)	Canadian-born American architect and engineer, of African descent. He was the first black architect registered in the states of Alabama (in 1935) and Michigan (in 1939).	
Liz Williamson	Dance	first artist-in-residence at Jacob's Pillow; dancer with Alvin Ailey American Dance Theater	

== Notable alumni ==
Name	Class year	Notability	Reference(s)
Chalmers Archer	1972	Author of "Growing Up Black in Mississippi" and "Green Berets in the Vanguard"	
Claude Albert Barnett	1906	Founder of the Associated Negro Press	
Chokwe Antar Lumumba	2005	53rd mayor of Jackson, Mississippi	
Robert Beck		1970s writer known as Iceberg Slim	
Bradford Bennett		Negro League outfielder/second baseman	
Charles Sumner Bowman	1898	Architect, educator and director at Western University	
Amelia Boynton Robinson	1927	International civil and human rights activist, the first woman from Alabama to run for United States Congress in 1964 (affectionately known as "Queen Mother Amelia"), best known for her role in the "Bloody Sunday" event in Selma, Alabama on March 7, 1965	
Albert Grant Brown		Architect and educator at West Virginia Colored Institute (now West Virginia State University)	
William A. Campbell	1937	A member of the Tuskegee Airmen who rose to the rank of Colonel	
Charles William Carpenter	1909	Baptist minister and civil rights activist	
Olandria Carthen	2022	Model, influencer, and television personality	
Carl Henry Clerk	1925	Gold Coast educator, administrator, journalist, editor, Presbyterian minister and fourth Synod Clerk, Presbyterian Church of the Gold Coast	
Alice Marie Coachman	1942	Athlete who specialized in high jump, and was the first black woman to win an Olympic gold medal	
The Commodores		1970s R&B band whose members met while attending Tuskegee	
George Williamson Crawford		Lawyer and city official in New Haven, Connecticut	
Leon Crenshaw		Former NFL player	
General Oliver W. Dillard		Retired Army major general, Silver Star recipient in Korea – 1950	
Milton C. Davis	1971	Lawyer who researched and advocated for the pardon of Clarence Norris, the last surviving Scottsboro Boy	
Cecile Hoover Edwards	B.A. 1946, M.A. 1947	Nutritional researcher and government consultant	
Ralph Ellison		Scholar, author of Invisible Man	
Chauncey Eskridge	1939	Lawyer for Martin Luther King Jr. and Muhammad Ali	
Vera King Farris	1959	President of Richard Stockton College of New Jersey from 1983–2003	
Isaac Fisher	1898	Educator, taught at Hampton University and Fisk University	
Drayton Florence	2003	NFL defensive back	
Lovett Fort-Whiteman		Political activist and Comintern functionary	
Manet Harrison Fowler	1913	Singer, founder of Mwalimu School in Harlem, president of Texas Association of Negro Musicians	
Alexander N. Green		U.S. Representative from Texas's 9th congressional district	
Winston C. Hackett		First African-American physician in Arizona	
Shawn Harris		Retired Army brigadier general	
Ken Howell	1982	Former Major League Baseball pitcher	
William Talbot Handy		Methodist minister and district superintendent	
Charlotte Moton Hubbard	1931	First black woman to serve as a deputy assistant secretary of state in the U.S.	
Marvalene Hughes		President of Dillard University	
General Daniel "Chappie" James	1942	US Air Force Fighter pilot, in 1975 became the first African American to reach the rank of four-star General	
Lonnie Johnson (inventor)		Inventor of the Super Soaker, former NASA aerospace engineer	
Ken Jordan		Former NFL player	
Tom Joyner	1971	Radio host whose daily program, The Tom Joyner Morning Show, was syndicated across the United States and heard by over 10 million radio listeners.	
John A. Lankford		20th century architect	
Marion Mann	1940	Former dean of the College of Medicine at Howard University and US Army Brigadier General (retired)	
Claude McKay	1912	Jamaican writer and poet, Harlem Renaissance	
Marilyn Mosby	2002	State's Attorney in Baltimore, MD	
Albert Murray	1939	Literary and jazz critic, novelist, and biographer	
Ray Nagin	1978	Former mayor of New Orleans, Louisiana	
Dimitri Patterson		NFL player	
Margaret and Roumania Peters	1941	Tennis players	
Dr. Ptolemy A. Reid	1955	Prime Minister of Guyana (1980–1984)	
Rich Boy		Rapper	
Lionel Richie	1974	R&B singer, Grammy Award winner	
Lawrence E. Roberts		Member of the Tuskegee Airmen and a colonel in The United States Air Force	
John Robinson (aviator)		Early aviator and colonel in the Imperial Ethiopian Air Force against Fascist Italy during WWII	
George C. Royal	1943	Microbiologist, was professor emeritus at Howard University	
Roderick Royal		President of the Birmingham City Council	
Jessica A. Scoffield	2002	Microbiologist and professor at the University of Alabama at Birmingham	
Betty Shabazz		Wife of Malcolm X	
Jake Simmons Jr.	1919	Oil broker and civil rights advocate	
Roscoe Simmons	1899	Columnist for the Chicago Tribune	
Danielle Spencer		Television actress best known as Dee from the 1970s TV show What's Happening!!	
McCants Stewart	1896	Lawyer, first African American to practice law in Oregon	
William Townsend	1941	Optometrist, Arkansas state legislator	
Frank Walker		NFL defensive back	
Keenen Ivory Wayans		Actor, comedian, and television producer	
Alfreda Johnson Webb	1943	First African-American woman in the North Carolina General Assembly (1972)	
Jack Whitten		Abstract painter	
Dr. David Wilson		President of Morgan State University	
Roosevelt Williams (gridiron football)	2000	Former NFL player for the Chicago Bears, Cleveland Browns, New York Jets	
Ken Woodard		former NFL player	
Edward Woolridge		Negro League infielder	
Elizabeth Evelyn Wright		Educator and humanitarian, founder of Voorhees College	

== See also ==
- List of National Historic Landmarks in Alabama
- UNCF
