= Lily McNair =

American psychologist

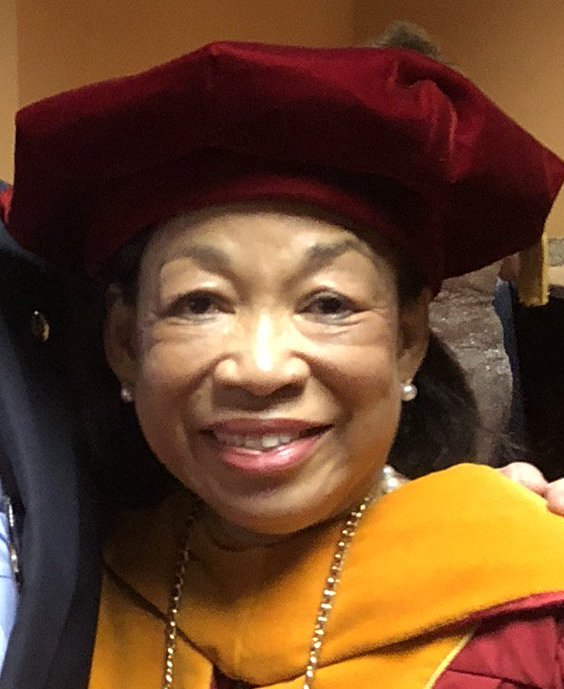
- Lily McNair in 2019

8th President of Tuskegee University
- Incumbent
- Assumed office July 2018

Personal details
- Education: Princeton University (B.A.); Stony Brook University (M.A., Ph.D)

Lily McNair is an American clinical psychologist and academic administrator who served as the president of Tuskegee University, a historically black university in Tuskegee, Alabama, from 2018 to 2021.

== Early life and education ==
McNair is from New Jersey. She earned a bachelor's degree in psychology at Princeton University, graduating in 1979. She then earned her master's and doctoral degrees from Stony Brook University. Her thesis examined alcohol consumption among female college students.

She initially worked as a psychologist in Poughkeepsie, New York at Vassar College.

== Academic career ==
McNair first served as a professor at the State University of New York at New Paltz before joining the University of Georgia as an Associate Professor of Psychology in 1992. She was the first African-American woman in the Department of Psychology to become a tenured professor and became associate director of the Clinical Psychology Doctoral Training program. Her research was funded by the National Institute of Mental Health and the Centers for Disease Control and Prevention, and focused on community interventions targeting substance abuse in African-American Youth. She was co-editor of five editions of Women: Images and Realities.

McNair joined Spelman College in 2004, working as Associate Provost of Research. She worked with NASA on a Women in Science and Engineering program that sought to increase the number of minority students in science and technology. She also worked with the National Institutes of Health and the Howard Hughes Medical Institute to ensure Spelman College became the leading institution for women of African descent.

In 2011, McNair joined Wagner College as Provost and Vice President for Academic Affairs. While at Wagner College, she increased the diversity of faculty hired by 116%. She established the annual Black History Month scholar symposium. She is a Trustee of Integration Charter Schools.

McNair was appointed as the eighth President of Tuskegee University in July 2018. She later took medical leave in January 2020, and it was announced on March 26, 2021, that she would not be returning to the university.
