= 1935 St. Louis Cardinals season =

Major League Baseball season

1935 St. Louis Cardinals
- League: National League
- Ballpark: Sportsman's Park
- City: St. Louis, Missouri
- Record: 96–58 (.623)
- League place: 2nd
- Owners: Sam Breadon
- General managers: Branch Rickey
- Managers: Frankie Frisch
- Radio: KMOX (France Laux); KWK (Bob Thomas); WIL (Neil Norman)

The 1935 St. Louis Cardinals season was the team's 54th season in St. Louis, Missouri and its 44th season in the National League. The Cardinals went 96–58 during the season and finished second in the National League.

== Offseason ==
- October 2, 1934: Bill Lewis was drafted from the Cardinals by the Boston Braves in the 1934 rule 5 draft.

== Regular season ==
During the season, Dizzy Dean became the last pitcher to win at least 25 games in one season for the Cardinals in the 20th century.

=== Season standings ===
National League
| Team | W | L | Pct. | GB | Home | Road |
|---|---|---|---|---|---|---|
| Chicago Cubs | 100 | 54 | .649 | — | 56‍–‍21 | 44‍–‍33 |
| St. Louis Cardinals | 96 | 58 | .623 | 4 | 53‍–‍24 | 43‍–‍34 |
| New York Giants | 91 | 62 | .595 | 8½ | 50‍–‍27 | 41‍–‍35 |
| Pittsburgh Pirates | 86 | 67 | .562 | 13½ | 46‍–‍31 | 40‍–‍36 |
| Brooklyn Dodgers | 70 | 83 | .458 | 29½ | 38‍–‍38 | 32‍–‍45 |
| Cincinnati Reds | 68 | 85 | .444 | 31½ | 41‍–‍35 | 27‍–‍50 |
| Philadelphia Phillies | 64 | 89 | .418 | 35½ | 35‍–‍43 | 29‍–‍46 |
| Boston Braves | 38 | 115 | .248 | 61½ | 25‍–‍50 | 13‍–‍65 |

=== Record vs. opponents ===
1935 National League record Sources:
| Team | BSN | BRO | CHC | CIN | NYG | PHI | PIT | STL |
|---|---|---|---|---|---|---|---|---|
| Boston | — | 6–16 | 3–19 | 10–12 | 5–16 | 8–14 | 2–20 | 4–18 |
| Brooklyn | 16–6 | — | 5–17 | 11–11 | 9–13 | 12–9–1 | 11–11 | 6–16 |
| Chicago | 19–3 | 17–5 | — | 14–8 | 14–8 | 13–9 | 15–7 | 8–14 |
| Cincinnati | 12–10 | 11–11 | 8–14 | — | 8–14–1 | 13–9 | 8–13 | 8–14 |
| New York | 16–5 | 13–9 | 8–14 | 14–8–1 | — | 12–10–2 | 14–8 | 14–8 |
| Philadelphia | 14–8 | 9–12–1 | 9–13 | 9–13 | 10–12–2 | — | 6–16 | 7–15 |
| Pittsburgh | 20–2 | 11–11 | 7–15 | 13–8 | 8–14 | 16–6 | — | 11–11 |
| St. Louis | 18–4 | 16–6 | 14–8 | 14–8 | 8–14 | 15–7 | 11–11 | — |

=== Roster ===
1935 St. Louis Cardinals
Roster
| Pitchers: 28 Phil Collins; 15 Mays Copeland; 17 Dizzy Dean; 21 Paul Dean; 20 Al Eckert; 16 Jesse Haines; 22 Bill Hallahan; 20 Ray Harrell; 32 Ed Heusser; 20 Tony Kaufmann; 24 Nubs Kleinke; 19 Bill McGee; 19 Mike Ryba; 19 Bud Tinning; 18 Bill Walker; 10,27 Dick Ward; 19 Jim Winford | Catchers: 8 Spud Davis; 9 Bill DeLancey; 33 Sam Narron; 29 Bob O'Farrell; Infielders: 12 Ripper Collins; 2 Leo Durocher; 3 Frankie Frisch; 4 Charlie Gelbert; 10 Lyle Judy; 1 Pepper Martin; 14 Burgess Whitehead; 33 Charlie Wilson | Outfielders: 24 Lynn King; 7 Joe Medwick; 11 Terry Moore; 5 Ernie Orsatti; 6 Jack Rothrock; 34 Tom Winsett; Other batters: 10 Gene Moore | Manager: 3 Frankie Frisch; Coaches: 25 Mike González; 26 Buzzy Wares |

== Player stats ==
=== Batting ===
==== Starters by position ====
Note: Pos = Position; G = Games played; AB = At bats; H = Hits; Avg. = Batting average; HR = Home runs; RBI = Runs batted in

| Pos | Player | G | AB | H | Avg. | HR | RBI |
|---|---|---|---|---|---|---|---|
| C | Bill DeLancey | 103 | 301 | 84 | .279 | 6 | 41 |
| 1B | Ripper Collins | 150 | 578 | 181 | .313 | 23 | 122 |
| 2B | Frankie Frisch | 103 | 354 | 104 | .294 | 1 | 55 |
| 3B | Pepper Martin | 135 | 539 | 161 | .299 | 9 | 54 |
| SS | Leo Durocher | 143 | 513 | 136 | .265 | 8 | 78 |
| OF | Joe Medwick | 154 | 634 | 224 | .353 | 23 | 126 |
| OF | Jack Rothrock | 129 | 502 | 137 | .273 | 3 | 56 |
| OF | Terry Moore | 119 | 456 | 131 | .287 | 6 | 53 |

==== Other batters ====
Note: G = Games played; AB = At bats; H = Hits; Avg. = Batting average; HR = Home runs; RBI = Runs batted in

| Player | G | AB | H | Avg. | HR | RBI |
|---|---|---|---|---|---|---|
| Burgess Whitehead | 107 | 338 | 89 | .263 | 0 | 33 |
| Spud Davis | 102 | 315 | 100 | .317 | 1 | 60 |
| Ernie Orsatti | 90 | 221 | 53 | .240 | 1 | 24 |
| Charlie Gelbert | 62 | 168 | 49 | .292 | 2 | 21 |
| Charlie Wilson | 16 | 31 | 10 | .323 | 0 | 1 |
| Lynn King | 8 | 22 | 4 | .182 | 0 | 0 |
| Tom Winsett | 7 | 12 | 6 | .500 | 0 | 2 |
| Lyle Judy | 8 | 11 | 0 | .000 | 0 | 0 |
| Bob O'Farrell | 14 | 10 | 0 | .000 | 0 | 0 |
| Sam Narron | 4 | 7 | 3 | .429 | 0 | 0 |
| Gene Moore | 3 | 3 | 0 | .000 | 0 | 0 |

=== Pitching ===
==== Starting pitchers ====
Note: G = Games pitched; IP = Innings pitched; W = Wins; L = Losses; ERA = Earned run average; SO = Strikeouts

| Player | G | IP | W | L | ERA | SO |
|---|---|---|---|---|---|---|
| Dizzy Dean | 50 | 325.1 | 28 | 12 | 3.04 | 190 |
| Paul Dean | 46 | 269.2 | 19 | 12 | 3.37 | 143 |
| Bill Walker | 37 | 193.1 | 13 | 8 | 3.82 | 79 |
| Bill Hallahan | 40 | 181.1 | 15 | 8 | 3.42 | 73 |
| Bill McGee | 1 | 9.0 | 1 | 0 | 1.00 | 2 |

==== Other pitchers ====
Note: G = Games pitched; IP = Innings pitched; W = Wins; L = Losses; ERA = Earned run average; SO = Strikeouts

| Player | G | IP | W | L | ERA | SO |
|---|---|---|---|---|---|---|
| Ed Heusser | 33 | 123.1 | 5 | 5 | 2.92 | 39 |
| Jesse Haines | 30 | 115.1 | 6 | 5 | 3.59 | 24 |
| Phil Collins | 26 | 82.2 | 7 | 6 | 4.57 | 18 |
| Mike Ryba | 2 | 16.0 | 1 | 1 | 3.38 | 6 |
| Nubs Kleinke | 4 | 12.2 | 0 | 0 | 4.97 | 5 |
| Jim Winford | 2 | 11.1 | 0 | 0 | 3.97 | 7 |

==== Relief pitchers ====
Note: G = Games pitched; W = Wins; L = Losses; SV = Saves; ERA = Earned run average; SO = Strikeouts

| Player | G | W | L | SV | ERA | SO |
|---|---|---|---|---|---|---|
| Ray Harrell | 11 | 1 | 1 | 0 | 6.67 | 13 |
| Bud Tinning | 4 | 0 | 0 | 0 | 5.87 | 2 |
| Tony Kaufmann | 3 | 0 | 0 | 0 | 2.45 | 0 |
| Al Eckert | 2 | 0 | 0 | 0 | 12.00 | 1 |
| Mays Copeland | 1 | 0 | 0 | 0 | 13.50 | 0 |
| Dick Ward | 1 | 0 | 0 | 0 | ---- | 0 |

== Awards and honors ==
- Dizzy Dean, National League Leader, Wins (28)

== Farm system ==
| Level | Team | League | Manager |
|---|---|---|---|
| AA | Columbus Red Birds | American Association | Ray Blades |
| AA | Rochester Red Wings | International League | Eddie Dyer and Burt Shotton |
| A | Houston Buffaloes | Texas League | Ira Smith |
| B | Bloomington Bloomers | Illinois–Indiana–Iowa League | Burleigh Grimes |
| B | Asheville Tourists | Piedmont League | Billy Southworth |
| C | Greenwood Chiefs | East Dixie League | Clay Hopper |
| C | Huntington Red Birds | Middle Atlantic League | Benny Borgmann |
| C | Jacksonville Jax | West Dixie League | Jimmie Sanders and Jackie Reid |
| C | Springfield Cardinals | Western Association | George Payne |
| D | Bentonville Officeholders | Arkansas State League | Bud Davis |
| D | Cassville Tigers | Arkansas State League | Ed Hawks |
| D | Fayetteville Bears | Arkansas State League | Pete Casey and Fred Cato |
| D | Huntsville Red Birds | Arkansas State League | Jim Nicely, Charlie Wilson and Bill Werner |
| D | Rogers Cardinals | Arkansas State League | Fred Cato and Buck Stapleton |
| D | Siloam Springs Travelers | Arkansas State League | Ray Powell |
| D | New Iberia Cardinals | Evangeline League | Sam Camalo and Bud Teachout |
| D | Albany Travelers | Georgia–Florida League | Bob Rice |
| D | Beatrice Blues | Nebraska State League | Charley Stis and Bennie Warren |
| D | Greensburg Red Wings | Pennsylvania State Association | Arnold Anderson and Heinie Mueller |

LEAGUE CHAMPIONS: Bloomington, Huntington, Jacksonville, Rogers
