= Monett Red Birds =

- 1936–1939; (1901, 1936–1939); Monett, Missouri

Minor league affiliations
- Class: Independent (1901); Class D (1936–1939)
- League: Missouri Valley League (1901); Arkansas–Missouri League (1936–1939)

Major league affiliations
- Team: St. Louis Cardinals (1936–1939)

Minor league titles
- League titles (0): None

Team data
- Name: Monett Railroadmen (1901); Monett Red Birds (1936–1939)
- Ballpark: J.C.C. Park (1936–1939)

The Monett Red Birds were a minor league baseball team based in Monett, Missouri. From 1936 to 1939, The "Red Birds" played as members of the Class D level Arkansas–Missouri League. They were preceded in minor league play by the 1901 Monett "Railroadmen" who played the season as members of the Independent level Missouri Valley League.

The Red Birds hosted minor league home games at J.C.C. Park.

The Monett Red Birds were a minor league affiliate of the St. Louis Cardinals for their duration.

== History ==
Minor League baseball began in Monett in 1901, when the Monett Railroadmen played as members of the Independent level Missouri Valley League. League rosters, records and standings from the 1901 season are not referenced.

In 1936, minor league baseball returned when the Monett Red Birds became charter members of the six–team Arkansas–Missouri League, a Class D level league that evolved from the 1935 Arkansas State League. The Arkansas State League became the Arkansas-Missouri League after the Huntsville Red Birds relocated to Missouri to become the Monett Red Birds.

In 1936, playing in the Arkansas–Missouri League, as an affiliate of the St. Louis Cardinals, the Monett Red Birds finished the season with a record of 56–63. Monett placed fourth in the Arkansas–Missouri League standings. The Bentonville Mustangs (69–49), Cassville Blues (61-59), Fayetteville Bears (53–67), Rogers Lions (44–75) and Siloam Springs Travelers (74–44) joined Monett in the league standings. Monett finished 18.5 games behind the champion Siloam Springs Travelers, playing under managers Buzz Arlitt and Ken Blackman.

On May 1, 1936, the Monett Red Birds hosted an exhibition game against the famed Negro leagues team, the Kansas City Monarchs. Baseball Hall of Fame member Willard Brown of the Monarchs hit a home run in the game, as the Monarchs won the contest 7–1.

Continuing play in 1937, Monett placed fifth in the Arkansas–Missouri League. With a record of 45–76, the Red Birds finished 36.0 games behind the 1st place Rogers Lions in the final standings of the six–team league. The Monett managers were Ken Blackman and Joseph Davis.

For the 1938 season, Monett adopted the one-word moniker Monett Redbirds. Resuming play in the Arkansas–Missouri League, Monett ended the season with a record of 44–74, playing under managers Heinie Mueller and Frank Sigafoos. The Redbirds placed fifth in the six–team league, finishing 30.5 games behind the first place Neosho Yankees.

Monett played their final season in 1939 and finished last as the Arkansas–Missouri League reduced to four teams. The Monett Red Birds ended their final season with a record of 35–89 to place fourth in the four–team league, finishing 45.5 games behind the champion Fayetteville Angels under manager Fred Hawn. The Monett franchise folded after the 1939 season, replaced by the Siloam Springs Cardinals in the 1940 Arkansas–Missouri League, which permanently folded after the 1940 season.

Monett, Missouri has not hosted another minor league team.

== The ballpark ==
The Monett Red Birds hosted minor league home games at J.C.C. Park. The "Junior Chamber of Commerce Park" had a reported capacity of 1,000 in 1936 and dimensions of (Left, Center, Right): 320–365–330 in 1939. J.C.C Park was located at South Lincoln Avenue (State Road 37), off U.S. 60, Monett, Missouri.

== Timeline ==
| Year(s) | # Yrs. | Team | Level | League | Affiliate |
|---|---|---|---|---|---|
| 1905 | 1 | Monnet Railroaders | Independent | Missouri Valley League | None |
| 1936–1939 | 4 | Monett Red Birds | Class D | Arkansas–Missouri League | St. Louis Cardinals |

== Year–by–year records ==
| Year | Record | Finish | Manager | Playoffs/Notes |
|---|---|---|---|---|
| 1901 | 00–00 | NA | NA | 1901 league records unknown |
| 1936 | 56–63 | 4th | Adolph Arlitt / Ken Blackman | Did not qualify |
| 1937 | 45–76 | 6th | Ken Blackman / Joe Davis | Did not qualify |
| 1938 | 44–74 | 5th | Heine Mueller | Did not qualify |
| 1939 | 35–89 | 4th | Fred Hawn | Did not qualify |

== Notable alumni ==
- Erv Dusak (1938)
- Al Montgomery (1937)
- Heine Mueller (1938, MGR)
- Frank Sigafoos (1938)
