= Fayetteville Angels (Arkansas baseball) =

- 1937–1940; (1934–1940); Fayetteville, Arkansas

Minor league affiliations
- Class: Class D (1934–1940)
- League: Arkansas State League (1934–1935); Arkansas-Missouri League (1936–1940)

Major league affiliations
- Team: St. Louis Browns (1939); Brooklyn Dodgers (1940)

Minor league titles
- League titles (0): None
- Conference titles (1): 1939
- Wild card berths (2): 1937; 1938

Team data
- Name: Fayetteville Educators (1934); Fayetteville Bears (1935−1936); Fayetteville Angels (1937–1940)
- Ballpark: Fairgrounds Park (1934–1940)

The Fayetteville Angels were a minor league baseball team based in Fayetteville, Arkansas. The Fayetteville "Angels" played from 1937 to 1940 and were a minor league affiliate of the St. Louis Browns in 1939 and the Brooklyn Dodgers in 1940.

The Fayetteville teams played as members of the Class D level Arkansas State League in 1934 and 1935. When the Arkansas State League evolved into the Arkansas-Missouri League, Fayetteville continued as a member, playing from 1936 to 1940 when the league folded.

Fayetteville hosted minor league home games at the Fairgrounds Park through 1940. Today, former ballpark site is located on the campus of the University of Arkansas.

Beginning in 2008, minor league baseball returned to Fayetteville's Northwest Arkansas region, when it became home to today's Class AA level Northwest Arkansas Naturals based in neighboring Springdale, Arkansas.

== History ==
=== 1934 & 1935: Arkansas State League ===
Minor league baseball play began in Fayetteville, Arkansas in 1934, when the Fayetteville "Educators" became members of the four–team Class D level Arkansas State League. The league reformed for the first time since folding following the 1909 season. The Bentonville Officeholders, Rogers Rustlers and Siloam Springs Buffaloes teams joined Fayetteville in beginning league play on May 7, 1934. All four charter teams were located near each other, in the Northwest Arkansas region.

In the first minor league game in franchise history, the Fayetteville Educators lost their home opener to Siloam Springs by the score of 9–7.

Cliff Shaw was the president of the Fayetteville Educators and also played third base for the team. Formerly the athletic director at University High School in Fayetteville, Shaw left the team in July 1935 after side effects of a previous appendicitis ended his career as a player.

Harold Ensley played for Fayetteville as an outfielder in 1934. He played another minor league season in 1935 before a broken arm ended his playing career. Ensley later became nationally known for his long-running television show, The Sportsman's Friend, which began in 1953 and ran for 48 years and for his many television appearances.

In their first season of play, the 1934 Fayetteville Educators finished last in the regular season standings and folded before the end of the season. The Educators ended the Arkansas State League regular season with a record of 33–42, placing fourth while playing the season under managers Fred Hawn and Frank Matthews. The Fayetteville and Silom Springs teams both folded on August 19, 1934, and a playoff was held between the surviving Bentonville and Rogers teams. Rogers defeated the Bentonville Officeholders 4 games to 3 to win the championship. In the final regular season standings, Fayetteville ended the season 7.0 games behind first place Bentonville. Parker Rushing of Fayetteville led the Arkansas State League with 96 hits in the shortened season.

Parker Rushing was a student at the University of Arkansas in Fayetteville and retired after two seasons of professional baseball. He operated the Rushing Plumbing Company in Fayetteville until his death in 1969.

Fayetteville manager Fred Hawn was a Fayetteville, Arkansas native. After his minor league playing career ended, he began serving as a minor league manager and was professional baseball scout from 1945 to 1973, mainly for the St. Louis Cardinals organization. His nickname was "Fayetteville Freddie."

Despite folding the season before, Fayetteville resumed play in 1935, as the newly renamed Fayetteville "Bears" continued Arkansas State League play. The Arkansas State League expanded to become a six-team league, adding the Cassville Tigers and Huntsville Red Birds franchises. The Bears ended the 1935 season with a record of 45–56, placing fifth in the overall regular season standings of the six–team league. Lyle Casey and Fred Cato served as the Fayetteville managers. Cato began the season as player/manager of the Rogers Lions. Fayetteville ended the season 17.0 games behind the first place Siloam Springs Travelers. Fayetteville did not qualify for the playoff after Rogers won the first half of the split season schedule and Siloam Springs won the second half. In the final, Rogers defeated Siloam Springs and won their second consecutive championship.

At age 30, the 1935 Fayetteville season was the final professional season for Fayetteville player/manager Fred Cato. From 1936 to 1938 Cato played for the House of David traveling baseball team along with his brother Louis Cato.

Fayetteville player/manager John Lyle "Pete" Casey was a native of neighboring Bentonville, Arkansas. Casey began his professional baseball career in 1922, before his playing career was slowed as a result of a hit by pitch to his left temple in 1927. The beaning permanently affected his hearing and sight. After leaving Fayetteville during the 1935 season, he played the remainder of the season for the Bentonville Officeholders. Casey then played for the Rogers Lions in 1936 in his final professional season as a player. In 1937 Casey served as a minor league umpire for the Arkansas-Missouri League. Casey died in Rogers, Arkansas in August 1937 at age 38.

In his only professional baseball season, Elmer Honea played in 117 games for Fayetteville in 1935 with positive results, hitting a grand slam in his very first at bat. At age 20, the Fayetteville native hit .285 with 20 home runs and 86 RBI in his lone professional season. Honea graduated from the University of Arkansas and played football at Arkansas in 1934. He had also lettered in basketball for Arkansas in 1935. Honea was a graduate of Fayetteville High School and wore #24 while playing basketball for the University of Arkansas.

=== 1936 to 1939: Arkansas-Missouri League ===
In 1936, the Arkansas State League evolved to become the Class D level Arkansas-Missouri League, with two teams from Missouri added into the league name. The Fayette Bears continued league play and the Huntsville Red Birds were replaced by the Monett Red Birds. The Bentonville Mustangs, Cassville Blues, Rogers Lions, Monett Red Birds and Siloam Springs Travelers teams joined Fayetteville in beginning Arkansas-Missouri League play on May 7, 1936.

In their first season of play in the newly named league, Fayetteville finished last in the Arkansas-Missouri League overall regular season standings and did not qualify for the playoff. The Arkansas-Missouri League played a split season schedule, with Cassville winning the first half pennant and Siloam Springs winning the second half pennant. With a regular season record of 44–75, the Bears played the season under returning manager Fred Hawn. Fayetteville finished 22.0 games behind first place Silom Springs in the final regular season standings. Fayetteville pitcher Robert Olson had 163 strikeouts to lead the league.

The team became known as the Fayetteville "Angels" in 1937 and continued Arkansas–Missouri League play. Fayetteville qualified for the four team playoffs in the five-team league and advanced to the finals. The Angels ended the 1937 season with a record of 70–56, finishing 8.5 games behind the first place Rogers Lions. The returning Fred Hawn and Ken Blackman served as the Fayetteville managers. Blackman had begun the season as the player/manager of the Monett Red Birds. In the first-round playoffs, the Angels Swept Siloam Springs in 3 games to advance. In the final, the Rogers Lions defeated the Fayetteville Angels 4 games to 1 to win the championship. Pitcher Loy Hanning of Fayetteville led the Arkansas–Missouri League with both 16 wins and a 1.63 ERA. Fayetteville teammate Edward Smith led the league with 179 strikeouts at age 19. The Angels' Paul Fugit compiled 183 total hits, most in the league.

Playing with Fayetteville in 1937 at age 19, in his first professional season, Loy Hanning pitched in the 1939 and 1942 seasons for the St. Louis Browns.

Fayetteville manager Ken Blackman later became a collegiate coach. He coached football, baseball and basketball at Buena Vista College in Iowa from 1947 to 1951. Blackman was inducted into the Buena Vista University Hall of Fame in 1999.

Local journalist and newspaper writer Walter J. Lemke wrote a column called "Angel Food" in the Northwest Arkansas Times. The Lemke column covered the Fayetteville Angels team. In 1952, Lemke wrote the book The Fayetteville Angels, or, Why Baseball is Our National Pastime: being A History of the Arkansas-Missouri League about the Fayetteville Angels and the other Fayetteville minor league teams that played between 1934 and 1940. Lemke established the Department of Journalism at the University of Arkansas in 1928. In his honor, the university named the department the Walter J. Lemke Department of Journalism in 1988.

The 1938 Fayetteville Angels advanced to the Arkansas–Missouri League playoffs. The Angels ended the regular season with a record of 66–53, placing third in the regular season standings. Cliff Knox served as the Fayetteville manager as the Angels ended the season 9.0 games behind the first place Neosho Yankees. In the first round of the four-team playoffs, the Carthage Pirates defeated Fayetteville 3 games to 1 en route to winning the league championship.

The 1938 season was the final professional season for Fayetteville player/manager Cliff Knox at age 38. A catcher, Knox had played briefly with the Pittsburgh Pirates in 1922. With the Angles in 1938, Knox appeared in 100 games, playing catcher in 86 games. He hit .326 with a .395 OBP, hitting 17 home runs with 84 RBI and 14 stolen bases. After his final minor league season, Knox returned to his farm in rural Oskaloosa, Iowa. Knox had started farming in 1936 and he would farm through 1965. Knox also began officiating Iowa school football and baseball contests throughout the state. He then advanced to being a collegiate football and basketball official, serving as a football official for the 1951 Sugar Bowl. From 1954 to 1961, Knox coached the baseball team at William Penn College. In emergency situation, Knox coached the 1956–57 William Penn College basketball team, compiling a 5–16 record and was an assistant coach for the 1956 football team.

In 1939, the Fayetteville Angels won the Arkansas–Missouri League pennant while playing the season as a minor league affiliate of the St. Louis Browns. The Arkansas–Missouri League reduced franchises and played the season as a four–team league after the Rogers Reds and Siloam Springs Travelers franchises folded and did not return to league play. The Angels won the pennant, ending the regular season with a record of 79–42, playing under manager Frank Oceak. Fayetteville finished 12.0 games ahead of the Second place Carthage Pirates. In the playoff final, Carthage won the Arkansas–Missouri League championship, defeating Fayetteville, 4 games to 1. Fayetteville pitcher George Bender led the Arkansas–Missouri League in three categories, with his 20 wins, 2.35 ERA and 208 strikeouts on the season being tops in the league.

After his 20–4 season with Fayetteville in 1939 at age 19, George Bender was unsuccessful in his next two seasons, pitching for four different teams in the St. Louis Browns organization and compiling a 13–23 record. He did not pitch in the minor leagues after the 1941 season.

Fayetteville player/manager Frank Oceak was a long-time minor league player/manager who became a major league coach for nearly two decades. With Fayetteville in 1939, he was considered the best second baseman in the league. Playing in 107 games with Fayetteville, Oceak hit .310 with a .382 OBP. Oceak came to Fayetteville at age 26 after having served as a player/manager in 1938 with the Lafayette White Sox of the Class D level Evangeline League. After leaving Fayetteville he became the manager of the Beaver Falls Browns of the Class D Pennsylvania State Association in 1940. There Oceak was suspended by Commissioner of Baseball Kenesaw Mountain Landis for the entire 1941 season after he had an assault on an umpire. On June 6, 1940, he assaulted umpire Len Burgher and was suspended by the league for 90 days and fined, a ruling that was extended by Landis. In 1958, Oceak began a seven-season tenure as the Pittsburgh Pirates' third base coach. On October 13, 1960, Oceak was coaching third base for the Pirates, during Game 7 of the 1960 World Series, when Pirate Bill Mazeroski hit his dramatic walk-off home run to win the Series against the New York Yankees. In 1965 Oceak was a coach with the Cincinnati Reds. After managing in the minor leagues from 1966 to 1969, Oceak returned to the Pittsburgh Pirates as their third-base coach, where he was on staff for the Pirates' victory in the 1971 World Series. Oceak retired from the Pirates staff following the 1972 season.

=== 1940: Final Arkansas–Missouri League season ===
The Arkansas–Missouri League played its final season in 1940. The season was the last minor league season for Fayetteville. With the league facing economic issues, the Monett franchise was moved to Siloam Springs in 1940 to balance travel in the league. The Arkansas–Missouri League began the season as a four-team Class D level league before folding on July 1, 1940. On June 28, 1940, the Fayette Angels franchise folded due to poor gate receipts and the league followed suit in folding. On June 30, 1940, the Arkansas–Missouri League's last regular season games were played. On July 1, 1940, a league All-star game was held at Carthage, officially ending the Arkansas–Missouri League season upon its conclusion.

In 1940, the population of Fayetteville was 8,212, which was an 11 percent increase from the 1930 population. The total population of Washington County, Arkansas in 1940 was 41,114.

On the date the league folded, June 30, 1940, the Carthage Pirates were 10½ games ahead in the league standings over second place Neosho. With a 21–29 record, Fayetteville ended their final season in third place, finishing 13½ games behind Carthage. In the shortened season, the Fayetteville Angels were a Brooklyn Dodgers affiliate managed by Ducky Holmes and Herb Fash. The Fayetteville Angels folded with the league. Fayetteville player/manager Herb Fash led the league with a .356 average and Angels' pitcher Joe Prylich had 9 wins to lead the Arkansas–Missouri League in its shortened season.

In a game at Fayetteville on June 9, 1940, Fayetteville won the game without getting a hit. In a home game against the Neosho Yankees, Neosho pitcher Walter Nasalik pitched a no-hit game against the Angels. Nasalik walked 5 batters in the game and lost to Fayetteville by the score of 1–0.

Managing the Fayetteville Angels at age 56, Ducky Holmes was a long-time minor league player and manager, who began his playing career in 1902. As a major league catcher, Holmes played briefly with the 1906 St. Louis Cardinals. Holmes had previously served as the owner and manager of the Dayton Ducks of the Middle Atlantic League from 1932 to 1938. Following the 1940 season with Fayetteville, Holmes returned to Dayton and managed the team in 1940 and 1941. After the team stopped play during World War II, Holmes ran a grocery store in Dayton before dying in 1945.

Fayetteville player/manager Herb Fash was killed in World War II in 1945. Fash had played both baseball and basketball at St. Louis University and began his professional baseball career after graduating from college in 1936. In 1940, Fash was hitting .356 for Fayetteville when the league folded. The Brooklyn Dodgers then sent him to the Class D level Olean Oilers, where he hit .408 in 66 games with the Oilers. In 1941 he suffered a broken leg while sliding that ended his season and he entered into service with the U.S. Navy in 1942. On January 21, 1945, fifty-two sailors, including Herb Fash, were killed in an explosion on their vessel at sea. Flash was buried at sea and is remembered at the Manila American Cemetery in the Philippines.

The Arkansas–Missouri League talked about resuming play in 1941, but the league season never materialized. After the folding of the Arkansas–Missouri League, Fayetteville, Arkansas has not hosted another minor league franchise. From 1944 to 1949, the Fayetteville Merchants, a semi-professional team played in Fayetteville, managed by former Fayetteville Educators player Buster Dunlap.

Today, the region is home to the Class AA level Northwest Arkansas Naturals based in neighboring Springdale, Arkansas, playing at Arvest Ballpark. The Naturals are a member of the Texas League and began play in 2008.

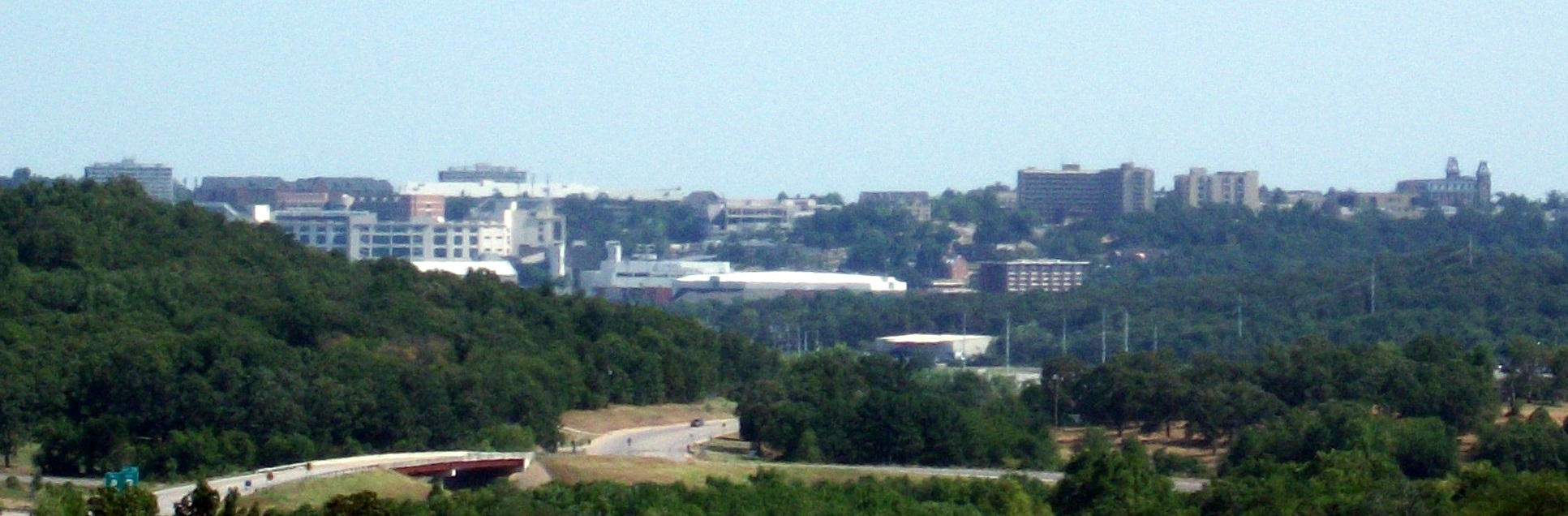
(2011) Fayetteville, Arkansas skyline featuring University of Arkansas campus.

== The ballpark ==
The Fayetteville minor league teams hosted home games at the Fairgrounds Park. The ballfield had a grandstand behind home plate facing northwest. The ballpark was located on the northwest corner of Mitchell Street and Razorback Road in Fayetteville. Fairgrounds Park had a seating capacity of 3,000 in 1939 and field dimensions (Left, Center, Right) of: 310–385–310.

For a time, the grassy field was used as a practice field by University of Arkansas sports teams. Today, the location of the Fairgrounds Park ballpark is on the campus of the University of Arkansas, serving as a sports complex for student recreation. The Department of University Recreation (UREC) "UREC Sports Complex" is utilized for student informal recreation, club and intramural sports. It is located on the corner of Mitchell Street and Razorback Road at 1486 Mitchell Street in Fayetteville, Arkansas.

== Timeline ==
Year(s)	# Yrs.	Team	Level	League	Affiliate	Ballpark
1934	1	Fayetteville Educators	Class D	Arkansas State League	None	Fairgrounds Park
1935	1	Fayetteville Bears	Class D	Arkansas State League	None	Fairgrounds Park
1936	1	Fayetteville Bears	Class D	Arkansas-Missouri League	None	Fairgrounds Park
1937–1938	2	Fayetteville Angels	Class D	Arkansas-Missouri League	None	Fairgrounds Park
1939	1	Fayetteville Angels	Class D	Arkansas-Missouri League	St. Louis Browns	Fairgrounds Park
1940	1	Fayetteville Angels	Class D	Arkansas-Missouri League	Brooklyn Dodgers	Fairgrounds Park

== Year–by–year records ==
Year	Record	Finish	Manager	Playoffs
1934	33–42	4th	Fred Hawn / Frank Matthews	Team folded August 19
1935	45–56	5th	Lyle Casey / Fred Cato	Did not qualify
1936	53–67	5th	Fred Hawn	Did not qualify
1937	70–56	2nd	Fred Hawn / Ken Blackman	Lost in final
1938	66–53	3rd	Cliff Knox	Lost in 1st Round
1939	79–42	1st	Frank Oceak	Won league pennant Lost in final
1940	21–29	3rd	Ducky Holmes / Herb Fash	League folded July 1

== Notable alumni ==
- Harold Ensley (1935)
- Loy Hanning (1937)
- Ducky Holmes (1940, MGR)
- Cliff Knox (1938, MGR)
- Barney Lutz (1936–1937)
- Earl Naylor (1937–1938)
- Frank Oceak (1939, MGR)

== See also ==
- Fayetteville Angels players

== Media ==
The Fayetteville Angles were the subject of two books.

- Angels in the Ozarks: Professional Baseball in Fayetteville, was written by J.B. Hogan and released in 2013. ISBN 9781940222103.
- The Fayetteville Angels, or, Why Baseball is Our National Pastime: being A History of the Arkansas-Missouri League, was written by Walter John Lemke (1891–1968) in 1952. Identifier: 2375238.
