= Alexandria Tigers =

- 1920; Alexandria, Louisiana

Minor league affiliations
- Class: Class D (1920)
- League: Louisiana State League (1920)

Major league affiliations
- Team: None

Minor league titles
- League titles (0): None

Team data
- Name: Alexandria Tigers (1920)
- Ballpark: Alexandria Ball Park (1920)

The Alexandria Tigers were a minor league baseball team based Alexandria, Louisiana. In 1920, the Tigers played as members of the short lived Class D level Louisiana State League, as Alexandria finished in fourth place in a shortened season. The Tigers hosted home games at the Alexandria Ball Park and were succeeded by the 1925 Alexandria Reds of the Cotton States League.

== History ==
The Alexandria Tigers were preceded in minor league play by the 1909 Alexandria Hoo Hoos of the six-team, Class D level Arkansas State League, who folded during the season.

Following the demise of the Hoo Hoos, Alexandria was without minor league baseball until the 1920 Alexandria Tigers played as charter members of the Class D level Louisiana State League. The Abbeville Sluggers, Lafayette Hubs, New Iberia Sugar Boys, Oakdale Lumberjacks and Rayne Rice Birds joined Alexandria in beginning league play on April 20, 1920.

The Louisiana State League permanently folded on July 14, 1920, with the Tigers in fourth place. Managed by John Carbo, G. Harris and Hank Chelette, Alexandria was 19.0 games out of first place after two league teams had folded during the season. New Iberia and Rayne simultaneously folded on July 6, 1920, leaving the league with four teams. The Oakdale Lumberjacks were in first place with a 37–24 overall record when the league folded on July 14. Oakdale had won the first–half title and the Abbeville Sluggers had the best second–half record when the league folded. Oakdale finished 1.0 game ahead second place New Iberia Sugar Boys (36–25). They were followed by the Lafayette Hubs (36–31), Abbeville Sluggers (33–35), Rayne Rice Birds (30–33) and Alexandria Tigers (23–47) in the final 1920 Louisiana State League standings.

Future major league player Bill Bagwell had a .344 batting average in 33 games for the Tigers in his first minor league season.

Alexandria was without minor league baseball until the 1925 Alexandria Reds began play as members of the Class D level Cotton States League.

== The ballpark ==
The 1920 Alexandria Tigers hosted minor league home games at the Alexandria Ball Park. The ballpark was located at Beech Street & Hickory Street, near the site of today's Bolton High School campus.

== Year–by–year record ==
Year	Record	Finish	Manager	Playoffs/Notes
1920	23–47	4th	John Carbo / G. Harris / Hank Chelette	League folded July 14

== Notable alumni ==
- Bill Bagwell (1908)
- Alexandria Tigers players
