= Alexandria Hoo Hoos =

- 1909; Alexandria, Louisiana

Minor league affiliations
- Class: Class D (1909)
- League: Arkansas State League (1909)

Major league affiliations
- Team: None

Minor league titles
- League titles (0): None

Team data
- Name: Alexandria Hoo Hoos (1909)
- Ballpark: Alexandria Ball Park (1909)

The Alexandria Hoo Hoos were a minor league baseball team based Alexandria, Louisiana. In 1909, the Hoo Hoos played briefly as members of the Class D level Arkansas State League, before folding during the season. The Hoo Hoos were preceded by the 1908 Alexandria White Sox of the Gulf Coast League.

== History ==
The Alexandria Hoo Hoos were immediately preceded by the 1908 Alexandria White Sox of the Class D level Gulf Coast League. The White Sox folded along with the league on June 3, 1908. At the time the league folded, Alexandria had a record of 14–15.

Minor league baseball resumed when the 1909 Alexandria Hoo Hoos began play as members of the eight–team Class D level Arkansas State League, as the league expanded from six teams to eight teams. The Argenta Shamrocks, Fort Smith Soldiers, Helena Hellions, Hot Springs Vaporites, Jonesboro Zebras, Monroe Municipals and Texarkana teams joined Alexandria in beginning league play on April 15, 1909.

The Alexandria "Hoo–Hoos" nickname corresponds to the local lumber industry, which has been historically prevalent in the Alexandria region. The Concatenated Order of Hoo-Hoo is a fraternal organization that was established in 1892. The oldest industrial fraternal organization in the United States, the Concatenated Order of Hoo-Hoo members consist of lumbermen and those in trades related to the lumber industry.

The Hoo Hoos were managed by Louisiana native John Auslet, who continued as manager, having managed the 1907 Alexandria White Sox. Alexandria folded during the 1909 season. On June 7, 1909, the franchise folded with a 20–23 record.

Alexandria was without minor league baseball until the 1920 Alexandria Tigers played as members of the Class D level Louisiana State League.

== The ballparks ==
Alexandria hosted minor league home games at the Alexandria Ball Park. The ballpark was located at Beech Street and Hickory Street, near the site of today's Bolton High School campus.

== Year–by–year record ==
| Year | Record | Finish | Manager | Playoffs/Notes |
|---|---|---|---|---|
| 1909 | 20–23 | NA | Jack Auslet | Team folded June 7 |

== Notable alumni ==
- Wingo Anderson (1908)
- Alexandria Hoo Hoos players
