= Siloam Springs Travelers =

- 1935–1938; (1934-1938); Siloam Springs, Arkansas

Minor league affiliations
- Class: Class D (1934–1938)
- League: Arkansas State League (1934–1935); Arkansas-Missouri League (1936–1938)

Major league affiliations
- Team: St. Louis Cardinals (1935); Cincinnati Reds (1936); St. Louis Browns (1938)

Minor league titles
- League titles (1): 1936
- Conference titles (2): 1935; 1936
- Wild card berths (2): 1934; 1937

Team data
- Name: Siloam Springs Buffaloes (1934); Siloam Springs Travelers (1935–1938)
- Ballpark: Smiley Park (1934–1938)

The Siloam Springs Travelers were a minor league baseball team based in Siloam Springs, Arkansas. The "Travelers" teams were members of the Class D level Arkansas State League from 1934 to 1935 and the Arkansas-Missouri League from 1936 to 1939, winning league a pennant in 1935 and the league championship in 1936. The 1934 team was known as the "Buffaloes."

The Travelers were a minor league affiliate of the Cincinnati Reds in 1938.

The Siloam Springs teams hosted minor league home games at Smiley Park in Siloam Springs.

== History ==
=== 1934 Siloam Springs Buffaloes ===
Siloam Springs first hosted minor league baseball in 1934, when the Siloam Springs "Buffaloes" began play as members of the four–team Class D level Arkansas State League. The Bentonville Officeholders, Fayetteville Educators and Rogers Rustlers joined Siloam Springs in beginning league play on May 7, 1934.

In their first season of play, the 1934 Siloam Springs Buffaloes finished the regular season as the runner up in the standings. The Buffaloes ended the Arkansas State League regular season with a record of 37–34, placing second while playing the season under manager Clyde Glass. In the overall standings, Siloam Springs ended the season just 1.0 game behind first place Bentonville. The league played a split–season schedule and Siloam Springs tied with Rogers for the first–half title. In a playoff, the Rogers Rustlers beat the Siloam Springs Buffaloes by the score of 5–2 in a one–game playoff for first–half title. In the finals, Rogers defeated the Bentonville 4 games to 3. Jonh Graves of Siloam Springs won the Arkansas State League batting title, with an average of .387, while player/manager Clyde Glass scored 67 runs to lead the league.

=== 1935 to 1937 Siloam Springs Travelers ===
The Siloam Springs team became known as the "Travelers" in 1935 and became an affiliate of the St Louis Cardinals, in winning the league pennant before losing in the finals. The Travelers ended the 1935 season with an overall record of 66–43, placing first in the regular season standings of the four–team league, and finishing 7.0 games ahead of the Rogers Cardinals, who were also a St. Louis Cardinals affiliate. Ray Powell served as the Siloam Springs manager, as the Travelers won the second–half title in the split–season format. In the playoff, the Rogers Cardinals, who won the first–half title in the regular season, defeated Siloam Springs 4 games to 1 to win their second consecutive championship.

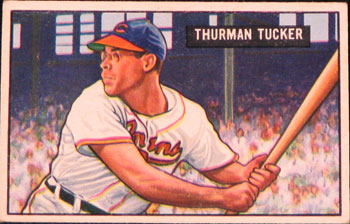
(1951) Thurman Tucker, Cleveland Indians, baseball card. Tucker played for Siloam Springs in 1936.

In 1936, the Arkansas State League evolved to become the Class D level Arkansas-Missouri League, as the league expanded to six teams. The Bentonville Mustangs, Cassville Blues, Fayetteville Bears, Monett Red Birds and Rogers Lions teams joined Siloam Springs as charter members of the newly named Arkansas-Missouri League.

In the first season of the new league, the Travelers became an affiliate of the Cincinnati Reds and won both the Arkansas-Missouri League pennant and overall championship. With Ray Powell returning as manager, the Travelers ended the regular season record of 74–44, to finish with the best overall record in the league, 5.0 games ahead of second place Bentonville. Silom Springs captured the second–half title in the split-season schedule. In the finals, Siloam Springs met Cassville, who had won the first half title. The Travelers defeated Cassville 4 games to 3 in the finals to capture the league championship

Kermit Lewis of Silam Springs led the 1936 Arkansas–Missouri League with 28 home runs. Lewis also had 164 total hits and scored 130 runs to league the league in both categories. His teammate Rudy Tone led the league with 125 RBIs. Traveler pitchers Clint Raper led the league with 23 wins and John Murray with an ERA of 1.35.

The 1937 Siloam Springs Travelers continued play in the Arkansas–Missouri League play and qualified for the playoffs. The Travelers ended the 1937 season with a record of 66–61, finishing 15.0 behind the first place Rogers Lions. Ray Powell concluded his tenure as manager. In the first round of the playoffs, the Fayetteville Angels defeated the Travelers 3 games 0. Rogers won their third championship with the subsequent finals' playoff win. Travelers player Gene Gibson led the Arkansas–Missouri League with 20 home runs.

==== Bob Neighbors ====
Bob Neighbors, who played for the Travelers in both the 1936 and 1937 seasons, later became the last major league player killed in action, losing his life in the Korean War. Neighbors had tried out for the Travelers after having never played baseball in high school and having only played softball. Neighbors hit four home runs in a doubleheader for Siloam Springs and eventually advanced in the minor leagues before he became a major league player for the St. Louis Browns in 1939. He enlisted in the Army Air Force in 1942 after the attack on Pearl Harbor. He remained in the military and on August 8, 1952, he and two crew members were killed during a bombing mission in Korea. Neighbors was 34.

=== 1938 Final season ===
In 1938 the Travelers became an affiliate of the St. Louis Browns, finishing last in the Arkansas–Missouri League standings. Siloam Springs ended the regular season with a record of 36–79, placing sixth in the standings, finishing 37.0 games behind the first place Neosho Yankees. Vincent Mullen, Clifton Marr and Michael Sertich served as managers, as the team did not qualify for the playoffs won by Neosho.

The 1939 Arkansas–Missouri League continued play reduced by two franchises and played the season as a four–team league, without a Siloam Springs franchise.

In 1940, the Siloam Springs Cardinals team returned to the league and played the final season of the Arkansas–Missouri League.

== The ballpark ==
The Siloam Springs minor league teams hosted minor league home games at Smiley Park. The ballpark site was located at the present site of Northside Elementary School. Today, Northside Elementary School is located at 501 West Elgin Street in Siloam Springs, Arkansas.

In the era of Blue laws, on Sundays Siloam Springs teams played home games across the border in neighboring West Siloam Springs, Oklahoma.

== Timeline ==
Year(s)	# Yrs.	Team	Level	League	Affiliate	Ballpark
1934	1	Siloam Springs Buffaloes	Class D	Arkansas State League	None	Smiley Park
1935	1	Siloam Springs Travelers	Class D	Arkansas State League	St. Louis Cardinals	Smiley Park
1936	1	Siloam Springs Travelers	Class D	Arkansas-Missouri League	Cincinnati Reds	Smiley Park
1937	1	Siloam Springs Travelers	Class D	Arkansas-Missouri League	None	Smiley Park
1938	1	Siloam Springs Travelers	Class D	Arkansas-Missouri League	St. Louis Browns	Smiley Park

== Year–by–year records ==
Year	Record	Finish	Manager	Playoffs/Notes
1934	37–34	2nd	Clyde Glass	Lost one game playoff
1935	66–43	1st	Ray Powell	League pennant Lost in finals
1936	74–44	1st	Ray Powell	League champions
1937	66–61	3rd	Ray Powell	Lost in 1st round
1938	36–79	6th	Vincent Mullen / Clifton Marr; Michael Sertich	Did not qualify

== Notable alumni ==
- Hooks Iott (1938)
- Larry Kennedy (1938)
- Fred Martin (1935)
- Bob Neighbors (1936-1937)
- Ray Powell (1935–1937, MGR)
- Herman Reich (1936)
- Everett Robinson (1935–1936)
- Thurman Tucker (1936) MLB All–star

== See also ==
- Siloam Springs Travelers players
