= Poplar Bluff Tigers =

- 1908; Poplar Bluff, Missouri

Minor league affiliations
- Class: Class D (1908)
- League: Arkansas State League (1908)

Major league affiliations
- Team: None

Minor league titles
- League titles (0): None

Team data
- Name: Poplar Bluff Tigers (1908); Brinkley Infants (1908)
- Ballpark: Sportsman's Park (1908); Brinkley City Park (1908)

The Poplar Bluff Tigers were a minor league baseball team based Poplar Bluff, Missouri. In 1908, the Tigers played briefly as members of the Class D level Arkansas State League. During the 1908 season, Poplar Bluff relocated to Brinkley, Arkansas and became the Brinkley Infants for the remainder of the season. The combined Poplar Bluff/Brinkley team finished last in the Arkansas State League standings.

The Poplar Bluff Tigers hosted minor league home games at Sportsman's Park.

== History ==
Minor league baseball began in Poplar Bluff, Missouri when the 1908 Poplar Bluff "Tigers" began play as members of the six–team Class D level Arkansas State League.

After beginning league play on April 20, 1908, the Poplar Bluff Tigers lost their first five games. It was reported that the Poplar Bluff franchise was having financial difficulties. Manager Al Sullivan left the team two weeks into the season and Arkansas State League president Thomas Craighead took over operations of the team.

The Poplar Bluff franchise relocated to Brinkley, Arkansas during the season. On June 8, 1908, the franchise relocated with a 16–58 record and became the Brinkley Infants for the remainder of the 1908 season.

The team continued play and compiled a 12–21 record playing the remainder of the season as the Brinkley Infants. Combined, the Poplar Bluff/Brinkley team placed last in the standings in their one season of minor league play. The team ended the 1908 Arkansas State League season with an overall record of 28–79, to place sixth in the Arkansas State League standings. Poplar Bluff/Brinkley finished 45.5 games behind the first place Hot Springs Giants and were managed by Al Sullivan and Lee Dawkins. The Helena Ponies (67–48), Newport Pearl Diggers (65–44), Pine Bluff Pine Knotts (51–61) and Argenta Shamrocks (49–68) also finished ahead of Poplar Bluff/Brinkley in the final standings.

In 1909, the Arkansas State League expanded to eight teams, but the Brinkley franchise did not return to the league.

Poplar Bluff, Missouri (and Brinkley, Arkansas) has not hosted other minor league team.

== The ballparks ==
The 1908 Poplar Bluff Tigers played minor league home games at Sportsman's Park. Today, the park is still in use as a public park in partnership with the Missouri Department of Conservation. The park is located on Business Highway 60E in Poplar Bluff, Missouri.

After the team moved to Brinkley, Arkansas the Brinkley Infants played home games at Brinkley City Park. Brinkley City Park is still in use as a public park. The park is located at 211 West Cypress Street in Brinkley, Arkansas.

== Timeline ==
Year(s)	# Yrs.	Team	Level	League	Ballpark
1908 (1)	1	Poplar Bluff Tigers	Class D	Arkansas State League	Sportsman's Park
1908 (2)	1	Brinkley Infants	Class D	Arkansas State League	Brinkley City Park

== Year–by–year record ==
Year	Record	Finish	Manager	Playoffs/Notes
1908	28–79	6th	Al Sullivan / Lee Dawkins	Poplar Bluff (16–58) moved to Brinkley June 8

== Notable alumni ==
- Wild Bill Luhrsen (1908)
- Ray Rolling (1808)
- Poplar Bluff (minor league baseball) players
- Brinkley (minor league baseball) players
