= Oakdale Lumberjacks =

- 1920; Oakdale, Louisiana

Minor league affiliations
- Class: Class D (1920)
- League: Louisiana State League (1920)

Major league affiliations
- Team: None

Minor league titles
- League titles (1): 1920

Team data
- Name: Oakdale Lumberjacks (1920)
- Ballpark: High School Field (1920)

The Oakdale Lumberjacks were a minor league baseball team based in Oakdale, Louisiana. In 1920, the Oakdale Lumberjacks played as members of the Class D level Louisiana State League, winning the league championship in the league's only season of play. Oakdale hosted home minor league games at the Oakdale High School Field.

== History ==
Minor league baseball began in Oakdale, Louisiana in 1920, when the Oakdale "Lumberjacks" became charter members of the six–team Class D level "Louisiana State Baseball League," also known as the "Louisiana State League." The Lumberjacks were joined by the Abbeville Sluggers, Alexandria Tigers, Lafayette Hubs, New Iberia Sugar Boys and Rayne Rice Birds teams in the 1920 league play, which began on April 20, 1920.

The Oakdale use of the "Lumberjacks" moniker corresponds to local industry in the era. Oakdale was noted to be "strictly a sawmill town," as there were at least five saw mills in operation in Oakdale in the era.

It was noted in local publications that the Oakdale Lumberjacks started the season slowly, before winning 15 out of 17 games to reach first place in the standings.

The Oakdale Lumberjacks forfeited 7 wins through June 27, 1920, due to using ineligible players.

On July 15, 1920, the Oakdale Lumberjacks were in first place when the Louisiana State League folded. The New Iberia and Rayne teams had previously folded on July 6, 1920. Oakdale had a record of 37–24, playing under manager Louis Bremerhof, when the Louisiana State League folded. The Lumberjacks finished 1.0 game ahead second place New Iberia Sugar Boys (36–25). They were followed by the Lafayette Hubs (36–31), Abbeville Sluggers (33–35), Rayne Rice Birds (30–33), Alexandria Tigers (23–47) in the final 1920 Louisiana State League standings.

Oakdale, Louisiana has not hosted another minor league team.

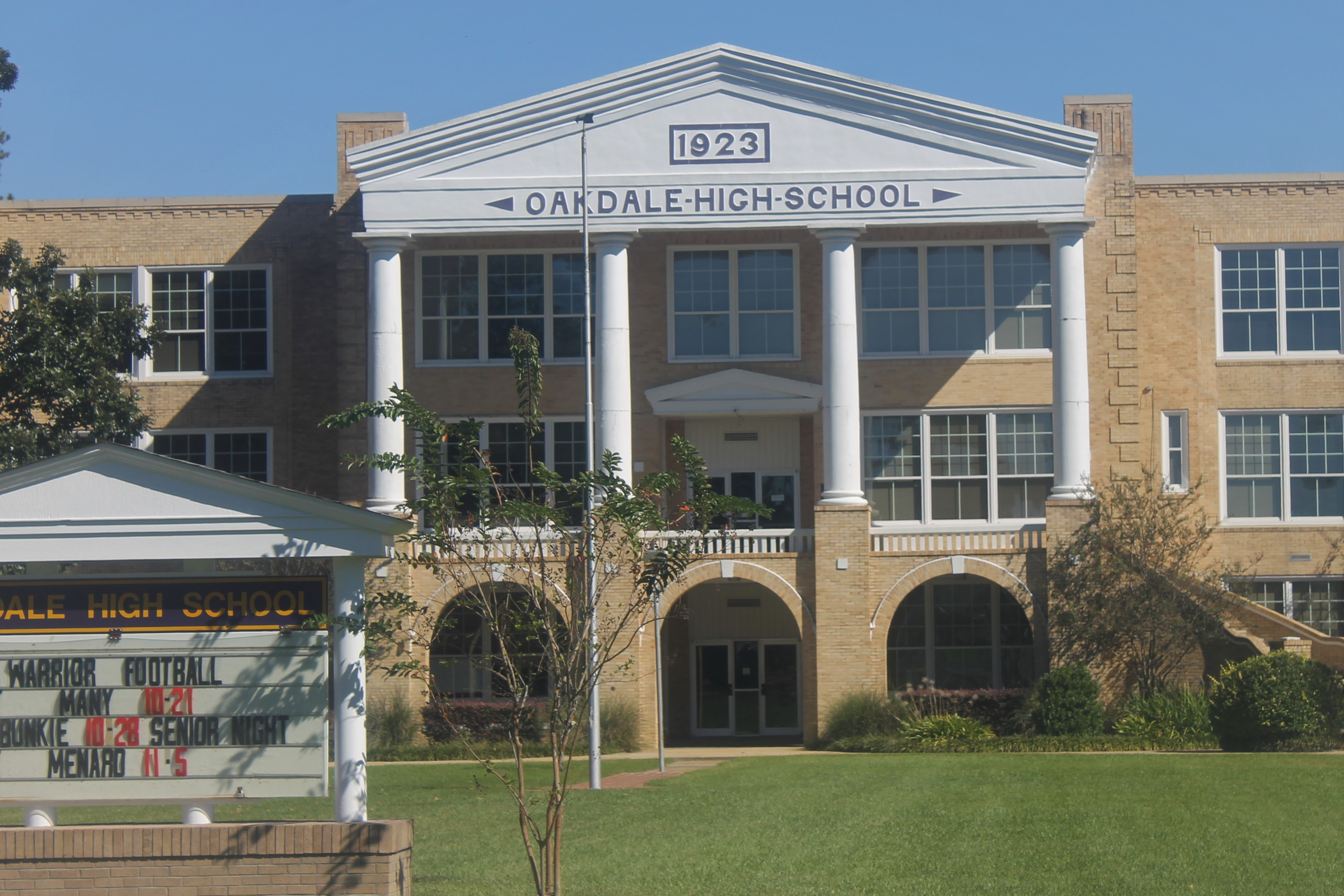
(2016) Oakdale High School. Oakdale, Louisiana

== The ballpark ==
The 1920 Oakdale Lumberjacks played home minor league home games at the Oakdale High School Field. Still in operation as a public high school today, Oakdale High School is located at 101 South 13th Street, Oakdale, Louisiana.

== Year–by–year records ==
Year	Record	Finish	Manager	Playoffs/Notes
1920	37–24	1st	Louis Bremerhof	League folded July 15; League champions

== Notable alumni ==
The player roster of the 1920 Oakdale Lumberjacks is unknown.
