= New Iberia Sugar Boys =

- 1920; New Iberia, Louisiana

Minor league affiliations
- Class: Class D (1920)
- League: Louisiana State League (1920)

Major league affiliations
- Team: None

Minor league titles
- League titles (0): None

Team data
- Name: New Iberia Sugar Boys (1920)
- Ballpark: New Iberia City Park (1920)

The New Iberia Sugar Boys were a minor league baseball team based Alexandria, Louisiana. In 1920, the Sugar Boys played as members of the short–lived Class D level Louisiana State League, as New Iberia folded from the league in a shortened season. The Sugar Boys hosted home games at the New Iberia Park and were succeeded by the 1924 New Iberia Cardinals of the Evangeline League.

== History ==
In 1920, the New Iberia "Sugar Boys" began play as charter members of the Class D level Louisiana State League. The Abbeville Sluggers, Alexandria Tigers, Lafayette Hubs, Oakdale Lumberjacks and Rayne Rice Birds joined Alexandria in beginning league play on April 20, 1920.

The use of the "Sugar Boys" nickname ties to local sugar cane agriculture and history. Today, New Iberia remains home to the annual "Louisiana Sugar Cane Festival."

During their first season of play, the Sugar Boys folded during the season. On July 6, 1920, the New Iberia and the Rayne Rice Birds teams both folded. Shortly after, the Louisiana State League itself permanently folded on July 14, 1920. Managed by Daniel Gandolfi, the Sugar Boys were in a battle for first place with a 36–25 record when the team folded during the season. When New Iberia and Rayne simultaneously folded on July 6, 1920, it left the league with four teams for the next eight days of league play. Oakdale had won the first–half title and the Abbeville Sluggers had the best second–half record when the league folded.

Overall, the Oakdale Lumberjacks finished 1.0 game ahead second place New Iberia Sugar Boys (36–25) in the league standings. They were followed by the Lafayette Hubs (36–31), Abbeville Sluggers (33–35), Rayne Rice Birds (30–33) and Alexandria Tigers (23–47) in the final 1920 Louisiana State League standings.

New Iberia next hosted minor league baseball when the 1934 New Iberia Cardinals began a tenure of play as members of the Class D level Evangeline League.

== The ballpark ==
The 1920 New Iberia Sugar Boys hosted minor league home games at the New Iberia Park. The ballpark was located at Marie Street & Parkview Drive. Today, New Iberia City Park is still in use as a public park with ballfields and other amenities. The park is located at 300 Parkview Drive.

== Year–by–year record ==
| Year | Record | Finish | Manager | Playoffs/Notes |
|---|---|---|---|---|
| 1920 | 36–25 | 2nd | Daniel Gandolfi | Team folded July 6 League folded July 14 |

== Notable alumni ==
The player roster for the 1920 New Iberia Sugar Boys is unknown.

== See also ==
- New Iberia Cardinals
