= Arkansas–Missouri League =

- Formerly: Arkansas State League
- Classification: Class D (1936–1940)
- Sport: Minor League Baseball
- First season: 1936
- Folded: 1940
- President: Bernal Seamster (1936–1938); Robert J. Henry (1939–1940)
- No. of teams: 8
- Country: United States of America
- Most titles: 3 Carthage Pirates (1938, 1939, 1940)

The Arkansas–Missouri League was a Class D level league in Minor League Baseball that operated from 1936 to 1940. The league was previously known as the Arkansas State League.

== Cities represented ==
- Bentonville, Arkansas: Bentonville Mustangs (1936)
- Carthage, Missouri: Carthage Pirates (1938–1940)
- Cassville, Missouri: Cassville Blues (1936)
- Fayetteville, Arkansas: Fayetteville Bears (1936); Fayetteville Angels (1937–1940)
- Monett, Missouri: Monett Red Birds (1936–1939)
- Neosho, Missouri: Neosho Night Hawks (1937); Neosho Yankees (1938–1940)
- Rogers, Arkansas: Rogers Lions (1936–1937); Rogers Reds (1938)
- Siloam Springs, Arkansas: Siloam Springs Travelers (1936–1938); Siloam Springs Cardinals (1940)

== Standings & statistics ==
1936 Arkansas–Missouri League

Team standings	W	L	PCT	GB	Managers
Siloam Springs Travelers	74	44	.627	–	Ray Powell
Bentonville Mustangs	69	49	.585	5	Arthur Hauger
Cassville Blues	61	59	.508	14	Gary Coker
Monett Red Birds	56	63	.471	18½	Adolph Arlitt / Ken Blackman
Fayetteville Bears	53	67	.442	22	Fred Hawn
Rogers Lions	44	75	.370	30½	Doc Ledbetter / Frank Stapleton

Playoff: Siloam Springs 4 games, Cassville 3. One tie

Player statistics
Player	Team	Stat	Tot	Player	Team	Stat	Tot
Lester Rock	Bentonville	BA	.333	Clint Raper	Siloam Springs	W	23
Kermit Lewis	Siloam Springs	Runs	130	Robert Olson	Fayetteville	SO	163
Kermit Lewis	Siloam Springs	Hits	164	John Murray	Siloam Springs	SO	1.35
Woody Tone	Siloam Springs	RBI	125	Kermit Lewis	Siloam Springs	HR	28

1937 Arkansas–Missouri League

Team standings	W	L	PCT	GB	Managers
Rogers Lions	79	48	.622	–	Ted Mayer
Fayetteville Angels	70	56	.556	8½	Fred Hawn / Ken Blackman
Siloam Springs Travelers	66	61	.520	13	Ray Powell
Neosho Night Hawks	52	71	.423	25	Dennis Burns
Monett Red Birds	45	76	.372	31	Ken Blackman / Joe Davis
Vinita	0	0	.000	NA	NA

Vinita the sixth franchise, withdrew May 5, before the season started. Season played with five teams.
Playoff: Fayetteville 3 games, Siloam Springs 0. Rogers 3 games, Neosho 1.
Finals: Rogers 4 games, Fayetteville 1.

Player statistics
Player	Team	Stat	Tot	Player	Team	Stat	Tot
Arnold Evans	Neosho	BA	.385	Loy Hanning	Fayetteville	W	16
Jerry Priddy	Rogers	Runs	109	Dewey Derry	Rogers	W	16
Paul Fugit	Fayetteville	Hits	183	Loy Hanning	Fayetteville	ERA	1.63
Tony Sams	Rogers	RBI	99	Edward Smith	Fayetteville	SO	179
Gene Gibson	Siloam Springs	HR	20				

1938 Arkansas–Missouri League schedule

Team standings	W	L	PCT	GB	Managers
Neosho Yankees	73	42	.635	–	Dennis Burns
Carthage Pirates	69	49	.585	5½	Adolph Arlitt
Fayetteville Angels	66	53	.555	9	Cliff Knox
Rogers Reds	63	54	.538	11	Lester Patterson
Monett Red Birds	44	74	.373	30½	Heinie Mueller
Siloam Springs Travelers	36	79	.331	37	Vincent Mullen

Playoff: Neosho 3 games, Rogers 0. Carthage 3 games, Fayetteville 2.
Finals: Carthage 4 games, Neosho 1.

Player statistics
Player	Team	Stat	Tot		Player	Team	Stat	Tot
Butch Moran	Rogers	BA	.392	Bill Gill	Neosho	W	20	
Steve Luby	Neosho	Runs	127	Bill Gill	Neosho	SO	266	
Marv Wolverton	Rogers	Hits	160	Bill Gill	Neosho	ERA	2.80	
Adolph Arlitt	Carthage	RBI	132	Steve Luby	Neosho	SB	76	
Butch Moran	Rogers	HR	22					

1939 Arkansas–Missouri League

Team standings	W	L	PCT	GB	Managers
Fayetteville Angels	79	42	.653	–	Frank Oceak
Carthage Pirates	67	54	.554	12	Adolph Arlitt
Neosho Yankees	65	61	.516	16½	Dennis Burns
Monett Red Birds	35	89	.282	45½	Freddie Hawn

Playoff Final: Carthage 4 games, Fayetteville 1.

Player statistics
Player	Team	Stat	Tot	Player	Team	Stat	Tot
Adolph Arlitt	Carthage	BA	.358	George Bender	Fayetteville	W	20
Steve Greble	Neosho	Runs	129	George Bender	Fayetteville	SO	208
Harvey Beaster	Carthage	Hits	171	George Bender	Fayetteville	ERA	2.35
Harvey Beaster	Carthage	RBI	106	Steve Greble	Neosho	HR	24

1940 Arkansas–Missouri League schedule

Team Standings	W	L	PCT	GB	Managers
Carthage Pirates	37	18	.673	–	Adolph Arlitt
Neosho Yankees	27	29	.482	10½	Ed Grayston
Fayetteville Angels	21	29	.420	13½	Ducky Holmes
Siloam Springs Cardinals	21	30	.412	14	Herb Moore

The league disbanded July 1.

Player statistics
Player	Team	Stat	Tot	Player	Team	Stat	Tot
Charles Fash	Fayetteville	BA	.356	Joe Prylich	Fayetteville	W	9
Charles Gibson	Carthage	Runs	55	Bob Playfair	Carthage	W	9
Charles Gibson	Carthage	Hits	71	Teddy Greble	Neosho	W	9
Adolph Arlitt	Carthage	RBI	59	Walt Nasalik	Neosho	SO	NA
Adolph Arlitt	Carthage	HR	12	Jim Obenour	Carthage	Pct	.857; 6–1

== Sources ==
The Encyclopedia of Minor League Baseball, Second Edition
