= Rogers Lions =

- 1934–1938; Rogers, Arkansas

Minor league affiliations
- Class: Class D (1934–1948)
- League: Arkansas State League (1934–1935); Arkansas-Missouri League (1936–1938)

Major league affiliations
- Team: St. Louis Cardinals (1935); Cincinnati Reds (1938)

Minor league titles
- League titles (3): 1934; 1935; 1937
- Conference titles (1): 1937
- Wild card berths (2): 1934; 1938

Team data
- Name: Rogers Rustlers (1934); Rogers Cardinals (1935); Rogers Lions (1936–1937); Rogers Reds (1938)
- Ballpark: Athletic Park (1934–1938)

The Rogers Lions were a minor league baseball team based in Rogers, Arkansas in 1936 and 1937. Beginning play as the Rogers Rustlers in 1934, and with Rogers using other nicknames (Cardinals, Reds), Rogers teams were members of the Class D level Arkansas State League from 1934 to 1935 and the Arkansas-Missouri League from 1936 to 1938, winning league championships in 1934, 1935 and 1938.

Rogers teams were a minor league affiliate of the St. Louis Cardinals in 1935 and the Cincinnati Reds in 1938.

Rogers hosted home minor league games at the Athletic Park in Rogers.

== History ==
In 1934, the Rogers Rustlers began play as members of the four–team Class D level Arkansas State League. The Bentonville Officeholders, Fayetteville Educators and Siloam Springs Buffaloes teams joined Rogers in beginning league play on May 7, 1934.

In their first season of play, the 1934 Rogers Rustlers won the Arkansas State League championship. The Rustlers ended the Arkansas State League regular season with a record of 36–35, placing third while playing the season under managers Ed Hawk and J.L. Casey. In the playoffs, the Rogers Rustlers beat the Siloam Springs Buffaloes in a one–game playoff for first half title. In the Finals, Rogers then defeated the Bentonville Officeholders 4 games to 3 to win the championship.

The Rogers Cardinals played as an affiliate of the St Louis Cardinals in 1935 and defended their Arkansas State League championship. The Cardinals ended the 1935 season with a record of 59–50, placing second in the regular season standings of the four–team league. Fred Cato and Bud Stapleton served as the managers. In the playoff, the Rogers Cardinals defeated the Siloam Springs Travelers 4 games to 3 to win their second consecutive championship.

In 1936, the Arkansas State League evolved to become the Class D level Arkansas-Missouri League, expanding to six teams. No longer a St. Louis Cardinals affiliate, Rogers continued play as the Rogers Lions. The Bentonville Mustangs, Cassville Blues, Fayetteville Bears, Monett Red Birds and Siloam Springs Travelers joined Rogers as charter members of the Arkansas-Missouri League. Rogers finished last in the regular season standings and did not qualify for the playoffs. With a regular season record of 44–75, the Lions place sixth, playing the season under managers Doc Ledbetter and Bud Stapleton. Rogers was 30½ games behind first place Silom Springs.

The 1937 Rogers Lions continued Arkansas–Missouri League play and won both the regular season pennant and playoff championship. The Lions ended the 1937 season with a record of 79–48, winning the pennant by 8½ games over the second place Fayetteville Angels. Ted Mayer served as manager. In the first-round playoffs, the Rogers Lions defeated the Neosho Night Hawks 3 games 1 to advance. Rogers defeated the Fayetteville Angels 4 games to 1 in the finals to give the franchise a third championship.

In their final season, Rogers became an affiliate of the Cincinnati Reds in 1938, advancing to the Arkansas–Missouri League playoffs. The Rogers Reds ended the regular season with a record of 63–54, placing fourth in the standings. Pat Patterson served as manager. In the playoffs, the Neosho Yankees swept Rogers in 3 games, which proved to be the final games for the Rogers franchise.

In 1939, Rogers did not return to league play, as the Arkansas–Missouri League reduced franchises and played the season as a four–team league.

Rogers, Arkansas has not hosted another minor league franchise. Today, the Northwest Arkansas region is home to the Northwest Arkansas Naturals of the Class AA level Texas League. The Naturals are based in neighboring Springdale, Arkansas.

== The ballpark ==
The Rogers minor league teams hosted home games at Athletic Park.

== Timeline ==
Year(s)	# Yrs.	Team	Level	League	Affiliate	Ballpark
1934	1	Rogers Rustlers	Class D	Arkansas State League	None	Athletic Park
1935	1	Rogers Cardinals	Class D	Arkansas State League	St. Louis Cardinals	Athletic Park
1936–1937	3	Rogers Lions	Class D	Arkansas-Missouri League	None	Athletic Park
1938	1	Rogers Reds	Class D	Arkansas-Missouri League	Cincinnati Reds	Athletic Park

== Year–by–year records ==
Year	Record	Finish	Manager	Playoffs/Notes
1934	36–35	3rd	Ed Hawk / J.L Casey	League champions
1935	59–50	2nd	Fred Cato / Bud Stapleton	League champions
1936	44–75	6th	Doc Ledbetter / Bud Stapleton	Did not qualify
1937	79–48	1st	Ted Mayer	League champions
1938	63–54	4th	Pat Patterson	Lost in 1st Round

== Notable alumni ==
- Marv Breuer (1934)
- Bill Burich (1937)
- Walker Cooper (1935) 8x MLB All–Star
- Al Gerheauser (1935–1936)
- Ed Hawk (1934, MGR)
- Eddie Kearse (1936)
- Mickey Owen (1934) 4x MLB All–Star
- Jerry Priddy (1937)
- Hale Swanson (1938)
- Hal Toenes (1938)

== See also ==
- Rogers Lions players
- Rogers Cardinals players
- Rogers Reds players
- Rogers Rustlers players
