= Larry Kennedy (baseball) =

American baseball player (1917–1995)

- Kennedy, c. 1937
- Pitcher
- Born: May 1917; Des Moines, Iowa, U.S.
- Died: March 4, 1995 (aged 77)
- Batted: Left Threw: Left

Professional baseball debut
- 1938, for the Mayfield Clothiers

Last appearance
- 1939, for the Lincoln Links

Class D statistics
- Win–loss record: 4–2
- Earned run average: 4.02
- Stats at Baseball Reference

Teams
- Mayfield Clothiers (1938); Siloam Springs Travelers (1938); Lincoln Links (1939)

Lawrence William Kennedy (May 1917 – March 4, 1995) was an American professional baseball player. A left-handed pitcher, he played two seasons in the minor leagues with the Mayfield Clothiers, Siloam Springs Travelers and Lincoln Links, and was known for going from living at Father Flanagan's Boys' Home in Boys Town, Nebraska, to playing professional baseball. He also twice served as the mayor of Boys Town, and was for a time their police commissioner as well as director of public safety.

== Early life and time at Boys Town ==
Lawrence William Kennedy was born in May 1917 in Des Moines, Iowa. Due to family circumstances, he went to live at Father Flanagan's Boys' Home in Boys Town, Nebraska, in March 1929. There, he often played sports with the other boys, showing "keen athletic ability." Although he participated in "all forms of sport," he showed the most promise in baseball, where he played as a pitcher. With the Boys Town high school baseball team in 1936, Kennedy won 14 consecutive games, including three no-hitters. He batted and threw left-handed, and his pitching style was considered unusual as he relied on an overhand fastball, while most left-handed players threw sidearm curves. In the winter of 1936, Kennedy worked out in the gym between 30 minutes and one hour every day to improve his abilities. He was trained by Ken Corcoran, a brother of former National Football League (NFL) player Jack Corcoran.

In addition to his athletic ability, Kennedy was also a highly respected citizen of Boys Town and was twice elected mayor, in 1935 and 1937. He also served as police commissioner around this time, being known for his "honesty, integrity, and fairness," according to The St. Louis Star and Times. He began his professional baseball career while he was still the mayor.

== Professional career ==
Near the end of June 1937, Kennedy and Corcoran attended a baseball school held in Des Moines, sponsored by the St. Louis Browns of Major League Baseball (MLB). At the event, he "fanned four of the eight batters he pitched against, wasted few balls, showed fine speed and a fairish [curveball]," according to The Home Journal. Several Browns scouts were in attendance, and one commented "He throws easy. He's got plenty of size. (Note: Kennedy was six feet tall and weighed 170 pounds.) He ought to go some place with those powerful shoulders and good legs."

Afterwards, Kennedy was sent two contracts by the Browns to sign. The contracts stated that he would attend training camp with Des Moines in the Western League, and if he was not retained by them, would go to a lower level team. He received much media coverage for going from Boys Town to professional baseball, and several articles compared him to Babe Ruth, one of the greatest players in the sport's history, who had also played as a left-handed pitcher and had been basically unknown prior to becoming a pro player.

After the collapse of the Western League in 1938, Kennedy was sent to the Class B Springfield Browns instead of Des Moines. After spending the spring training period with them, he moved to the Class D Mayfield Clothiers of the Kentucky–Illinois–Tennessee League (also known as the KITTY League). Kennedy saw little action as a pitcher in 12 games with the team, and afterwards was transferred to the Siloam Springs Travelers in the Arkansas–Missouri League so he would have more of an opportunity. He was referred to in a scene in the 1938 film Boys Town, where one character says "One of our guys plays in the St. Louis Browns' organization!"

After finishing his first year of professional baseball, Kennedy returned to Boys Town and began training every day in the gym for the 1939 season. In March 1939, he was given a trial by the Lincoln Links of the Western League. He made the team and played in seven games, pitching 41 innings and posting a 4–2 win–loss record with an earned run average of 4.02. After the season ended, Kennedy played in the Junior American Legion's "Little World Series" and caught the attention of Pittsburgh Pirates scouts, who promptly had him signed. He was assigned to the Class C Hutchinson Pirates, but suffered an injury to his arm which ended his professional career. Kennedy later played in local sandlots.

== Later life and death ==
Kennedy worked as a secretary for the Boys Town welfare office from 1940 to 1941. He attempted to join the Army in 1941 to serve in World War II, but was declined due to having a high blood pressure. He subsequently accepted a clerical position with the FBI and assisted agents in South America. After the war, Kennedy was hired at Boys Town by Father Flanagan, who placed him in charge of the Boys Town Security Patrol and the souvenir shop. He was their first official Chief of Police and also served as Director of Public Safety, retiring after being in these positions for 38 years.

With his wife, Pat, Kennedy had two daughters. He enjoyed coaching youth baseball teams and was a dedicated fan of the Omaha Royals, having his own reserved seat at Johnny Rosenblatt Stadium. He often arrived at their games over an hour and a half early, and enjoyed watching the pregame practice as well as playing with children in attendance.

Kennedy died on March 4, 1995, at the age of 77, of pneumonia following a stroke, connected to a car crash from several months prior. He was posthumously inducted into the Boys Town Alumni Sports Hall of Fame in 2008.
