= Bob Neighbors =

American baseball player (1917–1952)

- Shortstop
- Born: November 9, 1917; Talihina, Oklahoma, U.S.
- Died: August 8, 1952 (aged 34); North Korea
- Batted: Right Threw: Right

MLB debut
- September 16, 1939, for the St. Louis Browns

Last MLB appearance
- September 30, 1939, for the St. Louis Browns

MLB statistics
- Games played: 9
- At bats: 11
- Hits: 2
- Stats at Baseball Reference

Teams
- St. Louis Browns (1939)
Military career
Allegiance	United States
Branch	United States Army; United States Air Force
Service years	1942–1952
Rank	Major
Unit	13th Bomb Squadron
Conflicts	World War II; Korean War

Robert Otis Neighbors (November 9, 1917 – presumed dead August 8, 1952) was an American professional baseball player who appeared briefly with Major League Baseball's St. Louis Browns in 1939. He later served as a pilot in the Korean War and was shot down in 1952, making him the most recent major leaguer to be killed in battle.

== Baseball career ==
Born in Talihina, Oklahoma in 1917, Bob Neighbors graduated from Hominy High School and spent one year at Oklahoma Baptist University, Shawnee, Oklahoma. Neighbors had never played baseball –- only fast-pitch softball—when he signed with the Siloam Springs Travelers of the Arkansas–Missouri League in 1936. He batted .279 in 118 games with 16 home runs and 86 RBIs.

Neighbors produced similar numbers with the Travelers in 1937, and was called up by the Browns in September, but did not get into a major league game. In 1938, he joined the Palestine Pals of the East Texas League and hit .301 in 139 games. The shortstop moved up to the Springfield Browns of the Class B Three-I League in 1939, and his 14 home runs and 80 RBIs in 119 games earned him a second late-season call-up to the big club. The 21-year-old made his major league debut on September 16, 1939, and appeared in seven games, getting two hits — including a home run in Fenway Park off future Browns star Denny Galehouse — in eleven at-bats.

Neighbors returned to the minors in 1940, batting .279 for the Toledo Mud Hens of the American Association, one step below the majors. In January 1941, Neighbors married Winifred Wilcox, and the couple moved to San Antonio, where Bob played for the Texas League's San Antonio Missions in 1941. That summer, tragedy struck: while Bob was on the road with the team at the time, Winifred was hit by a car and killed. "It had a bad effect on Bob", his younger brother Morris said later. "Bob was on the road and Winnie back home in San Antonio when it happened. He felt that if he had been there -- if he had a job where he wasn't traveling -- it wouldn't have happened." Neighbors struggled to a .216 average and when World War II broke out he quit organized baseball to join the Army Air Corps.

== Military career ==
Neighbors entered military service with the United States Army Air Forces at Tulsa, Oklahoma on May 8, 1942. He served with the 22nd Air Transport Training Detachment at Sheppard Field in Wichita Falls, Texas, where he played baseball for the Sheppard Field Mechanics, a team that featured Dave Short of the Chicago White Sox, Ray Poole of the Philadelphia Athletics, Bill Gray of the Pacific Coast League's Hollywood Stars and future big-leaguer Ray Murray.

Neighbors later served at Maxwell Field in Montgomery, Alabama, where he met his second wife, Katherine "Kitty" Burke. He also served in California at Fairfield-Suisun Army Airfield and Hamilton Army Airfield, where he also had the opportunity to play ball.

At war's end, Bob Neighbors decided against returning to professional baseball, remaining in the military, although he did manage and play for the Maxwell Field team. Kitty gave birth to a son, Robert Cameron Neighbors, in 1950.

Major Neighbors saw combat duty during the Korean War as a Douglas Invader pilot with the 13th Bomb Squadron of the 3rd Bomb Group. On August 8, 1952, during a night mission, Neighbors and his crew – First-Lieutenant William Holcom and Staff-Sergeant Grady Weeks – reported they had been hit and were bailing out. There was no further contact and the crew was reported missing in action after failing to return. All hope for Neighbors, Holcom and Weeks was lost after the fighting in Korea ended on July 27, 1953, and prisoners were repatriated.
