= Cotton Pickers =

Cotton Pickers may refer to:

- The Cotton Pickers, an 1876 oil painting by Winslow Homer
- The Cotton-Pickers, a 1926 novel by B. Traven
- McKinney's Cotton Pickers, an American jazz band
- Morrilton Cotton Pickers, a 19th-century American minor league baseball team
