= Bill Bagwell =

American baseball player (1895-1976)

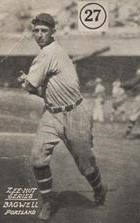
- Left fielder
- Born: February 24, 1895; Choudrant, Louisiana, US
- Died: October 5, 1976 (aged 81); Choudrant, Louisiana, US
- Batted: Left Threw: Left

MLB debut
- April 17, 1923, for the Boston Braves

Last MLB appearance
- September 26, 1925, for the Philadelphia Athletics

MLB statistics
- Batting average: .294
- Home runs: 2
- Runs batted in: 20
- Stats at Baseball Reference

Teams
- Boston Braves (1923); Philadelphia Athletics (1925)

William Mallory Bagwell (February 24, 1895 – October 5, 1976), nicknamed "Big Bill", was an American pinch hitter and left fielder in Major League Baseball. He played for the Boston Braves and Philadelphia Athletics during the 1920s. Bagwell was 6 feet, 1 inch tall and weighed 175 pounds.

== Career ==
Bagwell started his professional baseball career in 1920 in the Class D level Louisiana State League, with the Alexandria Tigers. That season, he had a .344 batting average in 33 games. Bagwell then spent two years in the Southwestern League. In 1921, he batted .357, and in 1922, he batted .402 and led the league in batting average, hits (217), and total bases (323).

In October 1922, Bagwell was selected by the Boston Braves in the Rule 5 draft. He played for both the Braves and the Eastern League's Worcester Panthers in 1923. With Boston, he batted .290 in 56 games; with Worcester, he batted .453 in 49 games to lead the Eastern League in batting average.

The Braves released Bagwell in April 1924. He spent one season in the Texas League, batted .367 with a career-high 37 home runs there, and then returned to the majors in 1925 with the Philadelphia Athletics. Bagwell spent nearly the whole season as a pinch hitter for Philadelphia. He appeared in 36 games and went 15 for 50 (.300) at the plate.

In 1926, Bagwell played for the Pacific Coast League's Portland Beavers. He batted .391 to lead his league in batting average for the third time. In 1927, however, Bagwell's average fell to .292 for Portland. He bounced around various minor leagues for the next few years before retiring from professional baseball after the 1930 season.

In his 11-year career, Bagwell hit .294 in the major leagues and .360 in the minor leagues. He died in Choudrant, Louisiana, in 1976.
