= Texarkana Shine-Oners =

Former minor league baseball team in Texas, USA

- 1905–1909; (1905–1906, 1909); Texarkana, Texas

Minor league affiliations
- Class: Class D (1905–1906, 1909)
- League: North Texas League (1905); Arkansas-Texas League (1906); Arkansas State League (1909)

Major league affiliations
- Team: None

Minor league titles
- League titles (0): None

Team data
- Name: Texarkana (1905); Texarkana Shine-Oners (1906); Texarkana (1909)
- Ballpark: Texas League Park (1905–1906, 1909)

The Texarkana Shine-Oners were a minor league baseball team based in Texarkana, Texas in 1906. Preceded and succeeded by 1905 and 1909 Texarkana teams without a nickname, as was common in the era, the three Texarkana teams played as members of the Class D level North Texas League in 1905, Arkansas-Texas League in 1906 and Arkansas State League in 1909. The three teams were each managed by Robert Shelton and hosted minor league home games at Texas League Park.

== History ==
After first hosting minor league baseball with the 1897 Texarkana Nobles of the Arkansas State League, the 1902 Texarkana Casketmakers played as members of Texas League for one season.

In 1905, Texarkana fielded a team in the Class D level North Texas League, before folding during the season. Texarkana disbanded August 2, 1905, causing the league to disband August 6, 1905. Managed by Robert Shelton, Texarkana ended the 1905 season with a record of 36–46, placing fourth in the North Texas League standings in the shortened season.

Texarkana continued play the next season, as the 1906 Texarkana "Shine–Oners" became charter members of the Class D level Arkansas-Texas League. Texarkana was joined by the Camden Ouachitas, Hot Springs Vapors and Pine Bluff Barristers as the charter members of the four–team league.

The team's Shine–Oners nickname was in reference to a popular song in the era, "Shine On Harvest Moon."

The Texarkana Shine–Oners folded during the Arkansas–Texas League season. The Texarkana team disbanded August 25, 1906 with a record of 28–30 and the league was forced to fold the next day, with only three remaining teams. Robert Shelton again served as the Texarkana manager. In the shortened season, the Shine–Oners finished behind the first place Pine Bluff Barristers (32–26) and second place Camden Ouachitas (29–28) and ahead of the fourth place Hot Springs Vapors (25–32) in the final standings.

After a two-season hiatus, Texarkana next hosted the 1909 "Texarkana" team of the Class D level Arkansas State League, which folded during the season. The eight–team Arkansas State League folded on July 7, 1909. Texarkana ended the Arkansas State League season with a record of 34–35, placing third in the final league standings, as Robert Shelton served as manager for a third time in Texarkana.

The 1912 Texarkana Twins of the Class D level South Central League were the next team hosted in Texarkana, continuing play at Texas League Park.

== The ballpark ==
The 1905, 1906 and 1909 Texarkana teams hosted minor league home games at Texas League Park. The ballpark was built in 1905.

== Timeline ==
Year(s)	# Yrs.	Team	Level	League	Ballpark
1905	1	Texarkana	Class D	North Texas League	Texas League Park
1906	1	Texarkana Shine-Oners	Class D	Arkansas-Texas League	Texas League Park
1909	1	Texarkana	Class D	Arkansas State League	Texas League Park

== Year–by–year records ==
Year	Record	Finish	Manager	Playoffs/Notes
1905	36–46	4th	Robert Shelton	Team folded August 2 League folded August 6
1906	29–30	3rd	Robert Shelton	Team folded August 25; League folded August 26
1909	34–35	3rd	Robert Shelton	League folded July 7.

== Notable alumni ==
- Jim Gray (1906)
- Texarkana (minor league baseball) players
