= Arkansas–Texas League =

- Classification: Class D (1906)
- Sport: Minor League Baseball
- First season: 1906
- Folded: 1906
- President: A. J. Kaiser (1906)
- No. of teams: 4
- Country: United States of America
- Most titles: 1 Pine Bluff Barristers (1906)
- Related competitions: Arkansas State League

The Arkansas–Texas League was a Minor League Baseball league which operated in three Arkansas and one Texas cities in 1906. The Class D level league had four teams in their lone season. A. J. Kaiser was the president of the league.

== History ==
The Arkansas–Texas League began play in 1906 as a Class D level league with four teams. The Camden Ouachitas of Camden, Arkansas, Hot Springs Vapors of Hot Springs, Arkansas, Pine Bluff Barristers of Pine Bluff, Arkansas and Texarkana Shine-Oners of Texarkana, Texas were the charter members.

On August 25, 1906, Texarkana folded. With three remaining teams, the league folded on August 26, 1906. The Pine Bluff Barristers were in 1st place when the league folded. With a 32-26 record, Pine Bluff was 2.5 games ahead on the 2nd place Camden Ouachitas. In a playoff, Pine Bluff defeated the Hot Springs Vapors 4 games to 1.

== Cities represented ==
- Camden Ouachitas (Camden, Arkansas)
- Hot Springs Vapors (Hot Springs, Arkansas)
- Pine Bluff Barristers (Pine Bluff, Arkansas)
- Texarkana Shine-Oners (Texarkana, Texas)

== Standings ==
1906 Arkansas–Texas League schedule

Team standings	W	L	PCT	GB	Managers
Pine Bluff Barristers	32	26	.552	--	Sandy Reeves / Leroy Taylor / Lee Dawkins / James Drake
Camden Ouachitas	29	28	.509	2½	Arthur Riggs / Cleve Turner
Texarkana Shine-Oners	29	30	.492	3½	Robert Shelton
Hot Springs Vapors	25	32	.439	6½	Wade Moore / Jack Love

Texarkana disbanded August 25.
The league disbanded August 26.
Playoff: Pine Bluff 4 games, Hot Springs 1.
