= Morrilton Cotton Pickers =

- 1894; Morrilton, Arkansas

Minor league affiliations
- Class: Class D (1894)
- League: Arkansas State League (1894)

Major league affiliations
- Team: None

Minor league titles
- League titles (0): None

Team data
- Name: Morrilton Cotton Pickers (1894)
- Ballpark: Unknown (1894)

The Morrilton Cotton Pickers were a minor league baseball team based in Morrilton, Arkansas. In 1894, the Cotton Pickers played as members of the Class D level Arkansas State League, placing second in their only season of minor league play.

== History ==
Minor league baseball first came to Morrilton, Arkansas when the 1894 Morrilton Cotton Pickers became charter members of the Class D level Arkansas State League. The Camden Rainmakers, Fort Smith Indians, Hot Springs Bathers, Little Rock Rose Buds and a Texarkana, Arkansas team joined Morrilton as charter members, although Fort Smith and Texarkana had no eventual records in league play.

On March 21, 1894, the team began training and exhibition play and hoped to secure the finances to field a professional team. In April 1894 a concert was held to raise funds for the team and to construct a fence for the team's home ballpark.

On May 10, 1894, Morrilton defeated Fort Smith 10–8 in a game at Morrilton in a "Non-League" game. On June 9, 1894, Morrilton lost a game at Camden 13–4. On June 27, 1894, Morrilton lost at Little Rock 7–4.

It was reported on May 14, 1894, that Morrilton had full stands at their home opener in which they defeated Fort Smith 16–8. The two teams were noted to have played again the next day when Fort Smith won 15–2 after Morrilton had only 8 players and had to get an additional player from the stands to play the game.

On June 9, 1894, the Fort Smith franchise dropped from the Arkansas State League and the Morrilton franchise officially took their place in beginning league play. At this time, Bob Darnell was named president of the team; R.W. Leigh, vice president; Loid Rainwater, secretary and treasurer and Jim Massey manager.

One month into the 1894 season, the Camden Yellow Hammers franchise, along with the Hot Springs Bathers franchise, both folded, causing the remaining four–team league to fold. The Morrilton Cotton Pickers, managed by Jim Massey, finished with a 10–5 record to place second in the league standings, finishing just a ½ game behind the first place Little Rock Rose Buds, who ended with an 11–5 record. The Camden Rainmakers (7–10) and Hot Springs Bathers (3–11) followed Morrilton in the final standings.

Morrilton, Arkansas has not hosted another minor league team.

== The ballpark ==
The name of the 1894 Morrilton home minor league ballpark is unknown. It was referred to in newspaper reports as the "home grounds." The facilities of the Morrilton Male and Female College were in use in the era, constructed in 1890.

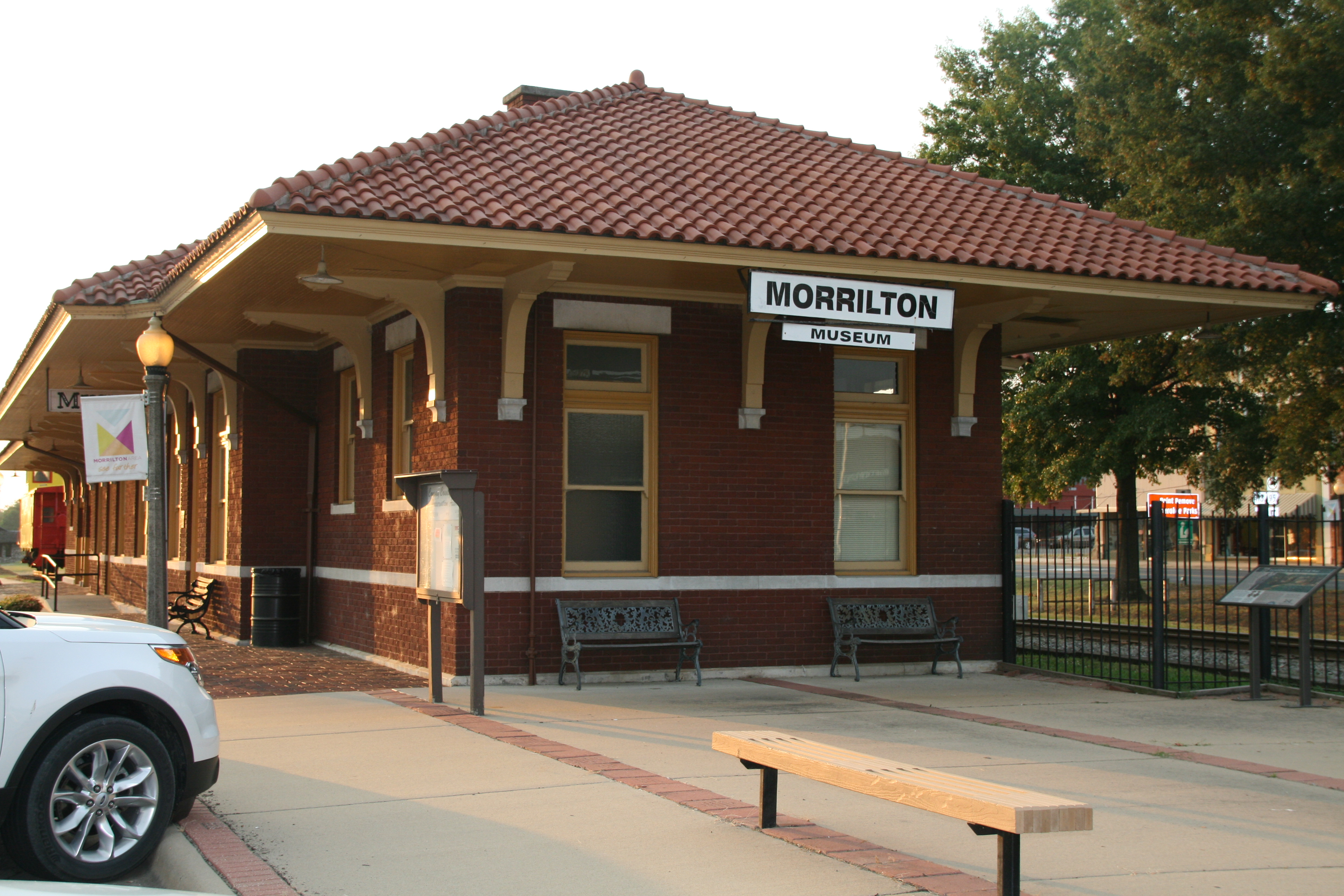
(2014) Train Station. National Register of Historic Places. Morrilton, Arkansas

== Year–by–year record ==
Year	Record	Finish	Manager	Playoffs/Notes
1894	10–5	2nd	Jim Massey	League folded

== Notable alumni ==
- George Gillpatrick (1894)

=== See also ===
Morrilton Cotton Pickers players
