= Carthage Pirates =

- 1938–1951; (1938–1941, 1946–1951); Carthage, Missouri

Minor league affiliations
- Class: Class D (1946–1951); Class C (1941); Class D (1938–1940)
- League: Kansas-Oklahoma-Missouri League (1946–1951); Western Association (1941); Arkansas-Missouri League (1938–1940)

Major league affiliations
- Team: Chicago Cubs (1949–1951); St. Louis Cardinals (1946–1948); St. Louis Browns (1941); Pittsburgh Pirates (1938–1940)

Minor league titles
- League titles (3): 1938; 1939; 1951

Team data
- Name: Carthage Cubs (1949–1951); Carthage Cardinals (1946–1948); Carthage Browns (1941); Carthage Pirates (1938–1940)
- Ballpark: Carl Lewton Stadium (1938–1951)

The Carthage Pirates was a primary name of the minor league baseball teams based in Carthage, Missouri from 1938 to 1941 and 1946 to 1951. Carthage won three league titles playing as members of the Arkansas-Missouri League from 1938 to 1940, the 1941 Western Association and the Kansas-Oklahoma-Missouri League from 1946 to 1951. Carthage hosted home minor league games at Carl Lewton Stadium.

== History ==
Carthage was initially a Class D level affiliate of the Pittsburgh Pirates that played in the Arkansas–Missouri League from 1938 to 1940. The Arkansas–Missouri League existed for only two full seasons, with the Pirates winning the league title each of those years. The league formally disbanded on July 1, 1940. When this occurred, the Pirates held a 10 1/2 game lead on first place in the league standings. The team then folded with the league.

The franchise then became the Class C level Carthage Browns in 1941 after the St. Joseph Ponies relocated to Carthage on June 3, 1941. They were a minor league affiliate of the St. Louis Browns, playing as members of the Western Association.

From 1946 to 1948, the Carthage "Cardinals" were a minor league affiliate of the St. Louis Cardinals playing as members of the Class D level Kansas-Oklahoma-Missouri League. The franchise remained in the league thougu 1951, becoming the Carthage "Cubs," an affiliate of the Chicago Cubs. The Cubs won the league title in 1951.

== The ballpark ==
Carthage teams played home minor league games at Carl Lewton Stadium. The stadium's namesake was a local umpire and educator. In 2023, the stadium was closed down due to safety issues, but was reopened after refurbishments in 2024.

== Notable alumni ==
- Cloyd Boyer (1946)
- Dennis Burns (1941)
- Frank Mancuso (1941)
- Bob Speake (1949)

== Season–by–season ==
Year	Record	Win–loss %	Manager	Regular season finish	Playoffs/notes
1938	69–49	.585	Adolph Arlitt	2nd place	Won Championship vs. Neosho Yankees, 4-1
1939	67–54	.554	Adolph Arlitt	2nd place	Won Championship vs. Fayetteville Angels, 4-1
1940	37–18	.673	Adolph Arlitt	1st place	League disbanded on July 1, 1940
1941	40–96	.294	Gus Albright /Dennis Burns	8th	St. Joseph Ponies moved to Carthage June 3
1946	54–66	.450	Adolph Arlitt	5th	None
1947	66–59	.573	Woody Fair/Alvin Kluttz	5th place	None
1948	51–67	.432	Alvin Kluttz	6th Place	None
1949	62–64	.492	Don Anderson	6th Place	None
1950	75–50	.600	Don Anderson	3rd Place	Lost in 1st round
1951	60–65	.480	Don Anderson (29–36)/Al Reitz (31–29)	4th Place	League champs

== See also ==
- Carthage (minor league baseball) players
- Carthage Browns players
- Carthage Cardinals players
