= Cassville Tigers =

- 1935–1936; Cassville, Missouri

Minor league affiliations
- Class: Class D (1935–1936)
- League: Arkansas State League (1935); Arkansas-Missouri League (1936)

Major league affiliations
- Team: Detroit Tigers (1935); Chicago White Sox (1936)

Minor league titles
- League titles (0): None
- Division titles (1): 1936

Team data
- Name: Cassville Tigers (1935); Cassville Blues (1936)
- Ballpark: Cassville Athletic Park (1935–1936)

The Cassville Tigers were a minor league baseball team based in Cassville, Missouri in 1935. With the Tigers succeeded by the 1936 Cassville Blues, Cassville teams played as members of the Class D level Arkansas State League in 1935 and the Arkansas-Missouri League in 1936.

The Cassville teams hosted home minor league games at the Cassville Athletic Park.

Cassville played as a minor league affiliate of the Detroit Tigers in 1935 and the Chicago White Sox in 1936.

== History ==
The Cassville area had hosted semi–professional teams prior to securing a minor league franchise.

Cassville first hosted minor league baseball in 1935 when the Class D level Arkansas State League League expanded to six teams, adding both the Huntsville Red Birds and Cassville Tigers as expansion teams. Cassville began minor league play as an affiliate of the Detroit Tigers, adopting their moniker.

Playing home games at Cassville Athletic Park, the Cassville Tigers began play in the 1935 Arkansas State League. The Cassville Tigers finished their first season of play with a 54–48 record. The Tigers placed 3rd in the Arkansas State League standings, playing under manager Ed Hawk. Cassville finished behind the first place Siloam Springs Travelers and second place Rogers Cardinals in the regular season standings.

The Arkansas State League became the Class D level Arkansas-Missouri League in 1936. Cassville continued play as the Cassville Blues, an affiliate of the Chicago White Sox. The Cassville Blues placed third in the 1936 Arkansas-Missouri League and advanced to the playoff finals. The Blues had ended the 1936 regular season with a record of 61–59, playing under Managers Gary Coker, Clifford Clay and Zeke Gansauer. In the Arkansas-Missouri League Finals, the Siloam Springs Travelers defeated Cassville 4 games to 3.

After the 1936 season, both the Cassville and Bentonville Mustangs franchises folded from the Arkansas-Missouri League due to financial reasons.

Cassville, Missouri has not hosted another minor league franchise.

== The ballpark ==
The Cassville teams minor league teams played home games at Cassville Athletic Park. The ballpark had a capacity of 1,000 and dimensions (Left, Center, Right) of: 320–450–385. The facility reportedly featured makeshift bleachers and a chicken wire backstop. Some fans allegedly sneaked into the games through the Reed Gym construction area located behind left field. Cassville Athletic Park was located at Mill Street & West 7th Street, Cassville, Missouri.

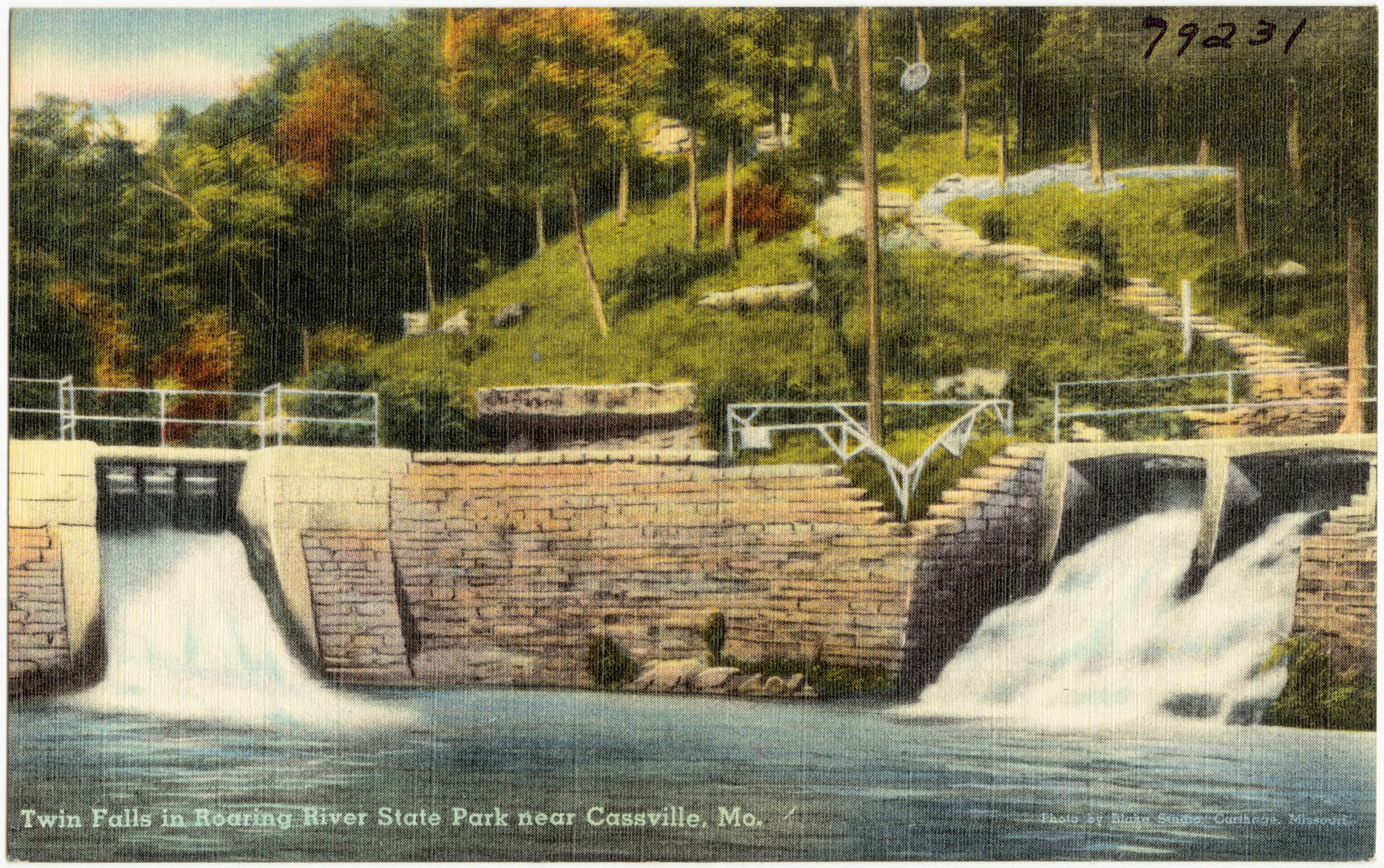
(1935) Twin Falls in Roaring River State Park near Cassville, Missouri

== Timeline ==
Year(s)	# Yrs.	Team	Level	League	Affiliate	Ballpark
1935	1	Cassville Tigers	Class D	Arkansas State League	Detroit Tigers	Cassville Athletic Park
1936	1	Cassville Blues	Class D	Arkansas-Missouri League	Chicago White Sox	Cassville Athletic Park

== Year–by–year records ==
Year	Record	Finish	Manager	Playoffs/Notes
1935	54–48	3rd	Ed Hawk	Did not qualify
1936	61–58	3rd	Gary Coker	Lost in league finals

== Notable alumni ==
- Woody Fair (1935)
- Ed Hawk (1935, MGR)
- Cassville Tigers players
