= Siloam Springs Cardinals =

- 1940; Siloam Springs, Arkansas

Minor league affiliations
- Previous classes: Class D
- League: Arkansas–Missouri League (1940)
- Previous leagues: Arkansas–Missouri League (1936–1938); Arkansas State League (1934–1935)

Major league affiliations
- Previous teams: St. Louis Cardinals (1940)

Minor league titles
- League titles: None

Team data
- Previous names: Siloam Springs Cardinals (1940); Siloam Springs Travelers (1935–1938); Siloam Springs Buffaloes (1934)
- Previous parks: Smiley Park

The Siloam Springs Cardinals (previously known as the Buffaloes and the Travelers) were a minor league baseball team that represented Siloam Springs, Arkansas. In 1940 Siloam Springs played as members of the Arkansas–Missouri League in the final season of the league. The Siloam Springs "Cardinals" were a minor league affiliate of the St. Louis Cardinals. The Cardinals followed previous Siloam Springs teams in the Arkansas–Missouri League and its predecessor, the Arkansas State League between 1934 and 1938.

== History ==
The 1940 Siloam Springs Cardinals were a minor league affiliate of the St. Louis Cardinals and played in the final season of the four-team Class D level Arkansas–Missouri League. Siloam Springs rejoined the league after a one year absence, after the league reduced teams in 1939.

Siloam Springs ended the 1940 season in last place, as the league disbanded on July 1, 1940. When the league folded, Siloam Springs had a record of 21-30 and ended the season 14.0 games behind the first place Carthage Pirates. The Cardinals were managed by Herb Moore.

== The ballpark ==
The Siloam Springs Cardinals hosted home minor league games at Smiley Park. The ballpark previously hosted the Siloam Springs Buffaloes (1934) and Siloam Springs Travelers (1935-1938) teams. The ballpark was located at the present site of Siloam Springs' Northside Elementary School. Northside Elementary School is located at 501 West Elgin Street in Siloam Springs, Arkansas.
