= San Lorenzo Cemetery =

Cemetery in St. Augustine, Florida

Coordinates: 29.8723°N 81.3251°W

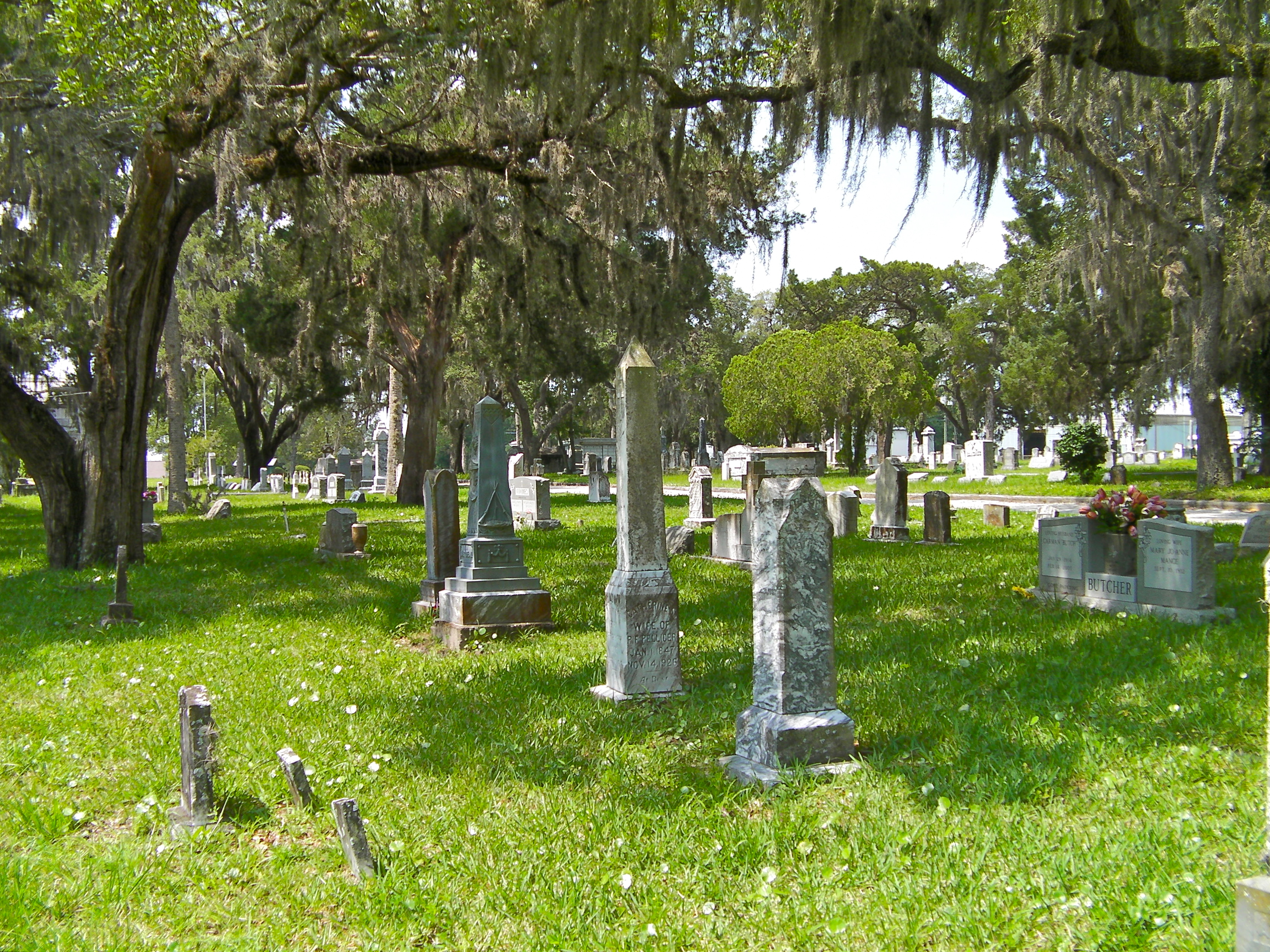
- San Lorenzo Cemetery
- Interactive map of San Lorenzo Cemetery

Details
- Location: St. Augustine, Florida

San Lorenzo Cemetery is a cemetery located in St. Augustine, Florida, United States. One person of note interred there is baseball player Lyle Judy.
