= Neosho Yankees =

- 1937–1940; Neosho, Missouri

Minor league affiliations
- Class: Class D (1937–1940)
- League: Arkansas–Missouri League (1937–1940)

Major league affiliations
- Team: New York Yankees (1938–1940)

Minor league titles
- League titles (0): None
- Conference titles (1): 1938
- Wild card berths (1): 1937

Team data
- Name: Neosho Night Hawks (1937); Neosho Yankees (1938–1940)
- Ballpark: Neosho High School Stadium (1937–1940)

The Neosho Yankees were a minor league baseball team based in Neosho, Missouri. From 1937 to 1940, Neosho teams played exclusively as members of the Class D level Arkansas–Missouri League, winning the 1938 league pennant. Adopting their nickname, Neosho served as a minor league affiliate of the New York Yankees from 1938 to 1940, after playing in 1937 as the unaffiliated Neosho "Night Hawks."

Neosho teams hosted minor league home games at the Neosho High School Stadium.

== History ==
Neosho, Missouri first hosted minor league baseball in 1937, when the Neosho Night Hawks became a member of the five–team Arkansas–Missouri League, playing at Neosho High School Stadium. The Night Hawks finished the 1937 Arkansas–Missouri League regular season in fourth place with a 52–71 record, finishing 25.0 games behind the first place Rogers Lions. Playing under Manager Dennis Burns, Neosho lost to Rogers 3 games to 1 in the first round of the playoffs.

In 1938, Neosho became an affiliate of the New York Yankees and captured Arkansas–Missouri League pennant. The newly named Neosho Yankees finished the regular season with a record of 73–42 under returning manager Dennis Burns. Neosho finished 5.5 games ahead of the second place Carthage Pirates, who had just joined the six–team league. In the 1938 Playoffs, Neosho swept the Rogers Reds in three games to advance to the Finals. In the Arkansas–Missouri League Finals, the Carthage Pirates defeated Neosho 4 games to 1.

The Arkansas–Missouri League played with four teams in 1939. In the regular season, the Neosho Yankees ended with a record of 65–61, finishing in third place. Playing again under manager Dennis Burns, Neosho finished 16.5 games behind the first place Fayetteville Angels. Neosho did not qualify for the 1939 playoffs.

Ralph Houk played for Neosho in 1939, in his first professional season. With a salary of $70.00 a month, Houk played well enough (.286) that Neosho hosted a "Ralph Houk Day" at the ballpark.

In 1940, the four–team Arkansas–Missouri League permanently folded during the season, as Neosho played its final minor league season. The league folding became unavoidable after the Fayetteville Angels franchise folded due to poor attendance. On July 1, 1940, the league folded after hosting an All-Star game. At the time the league folded, the Neosho Yankees were in second place with a 27–29 record under manager Ed Grayston and were 10.5 games behind the first place Carthage Pirates.

The Arkansas–Missouri League did not return to play in 1941. Neosho, Missouri has not hosted another minor league team.

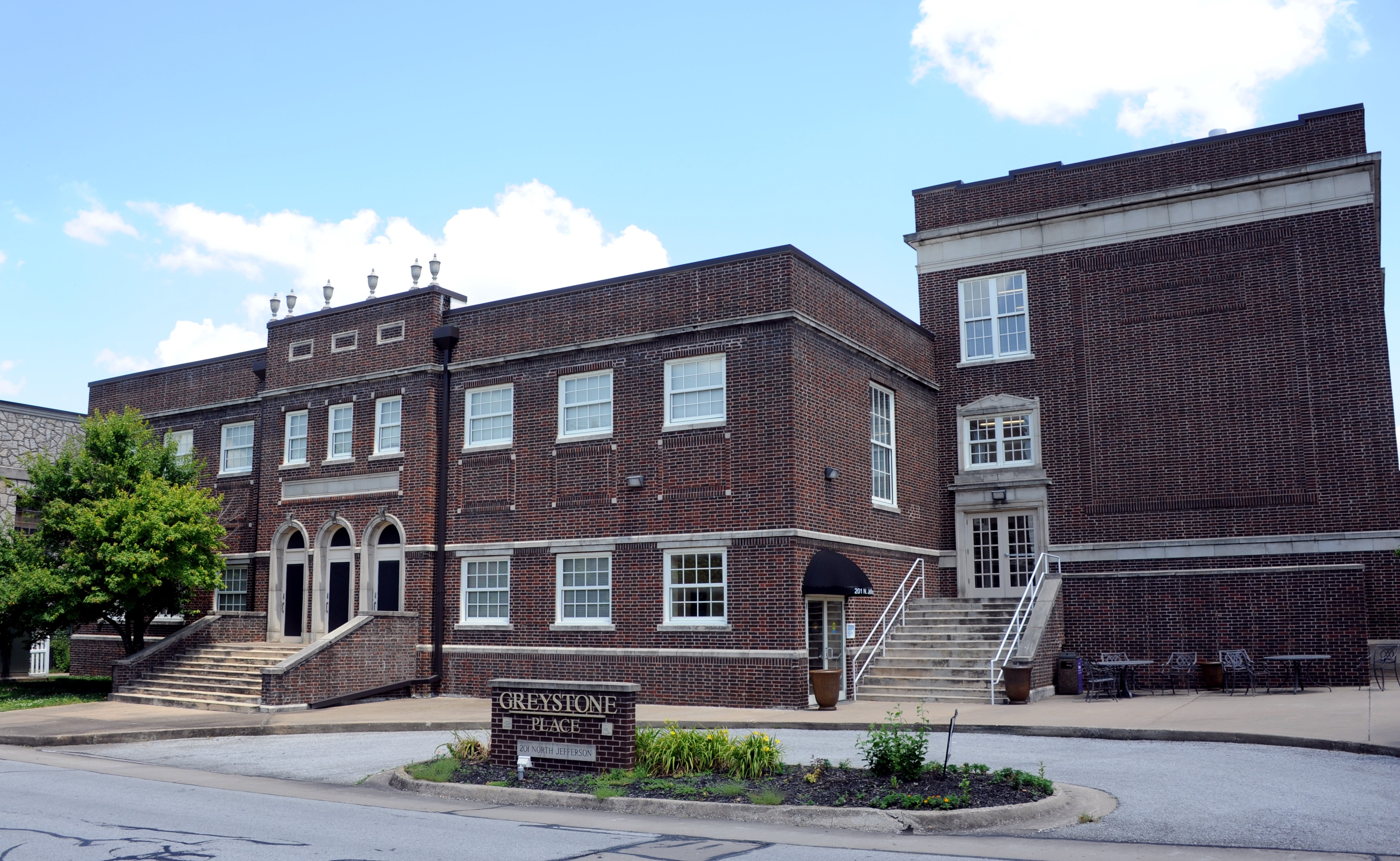
(2020) Neosho High School, 1916-1954. Neosho, Missouri.

== The ballpark ==
Neosho teams were noted to have played minor league home games at High School Stadium later known as Veta Street Park. The Veta Street ballfield was located south and west of the intersection of Harmony and Veta Streets. In the 1950s, the Neosho school district constructed a new high school campus and a football field just south of the Veta Street park, later named for longtime Neosho school superintendent Robert Anderson in the 1960s, as Bob Anderson Stadium, the current high school football field.

The Veta Street ballpark had a capacity of 1,000 in 1939, with stone and concrete bleachers built into the hillside just below Veta Street along the first-base line. The field's dimensions were (Left, Center, Right): 310–340–310. With the construction of Bob Anderson Stadium in the 1950s, the Veta Street field was used as a football practice field in season and for various baseball programs during the summer.

In the mid-1970s, after much public interest, the Neosho school district established a high school baseball program and continued to play at Veta Street, renamed by the Neosho School District board of education in 1994 for retiring school superintendent Roy Shaver as Roy B. Shaver Field.

By 2020, the school district set out to construct a 40,000-square-foot indoor north endzone practice facility on the Veta Street field, ending eight decades as a baseball park, with upgraded restrooms and concessions, at the north endzone of Bob Anderson Stadium. A new Roy B. Shaver ballfield was constructed at a newly established elementary and junior high school campus west of Neosho and dedicated in March 2021.

== Timeline ==
Year(s)	# Yrs.	Team	Level	League	Affiliate	Ballpark
1937	1	Neosho Night Hawks	Class D	Arkansas–Missouri League	None	Neosho High School Stadium
1938–1940	3	Neosho Yankees	Class D	Arkansas–Missouri League	New York Yankees	Neosho High School Stadium

== Year–by–year records ==
Year	Record	Finish	Manager	Playoffs
1937	52–71	4th	Dennis Burns	Lost in 1st round
1938	37–42	1st	Dennis Burns	Won league pennant Lost in League Finals
1939	65–61	3rd	Dennis Burns	Did not qualify
1940	27–29	2nd	Ed Grayston	League disbanded July 1

== Notable alumni ==
- Dennis Burns (1937–1939, MGR)
- Ralph Houk (1939) Manager: 2x World Series Champion - New York Yankees (1960–1961)
- Chuck Orsborn (1939)

== See also ==
- Neosho Yankees players
