= Charlie Wilson (baseball) =

American baseball player (1905–1970)

- Shortstop / Third baseman
- Born: January 13, 1905; Clinton, South Carolina
- Died: December 19, 1970 (aged 65); Rochester, New York
- Batted: Both Threw: Right

MLB debut
- April 14, 1931, for the Boston Braves

Last MLB appearance
- May 25, 1935, for the St. Louis Cardinals

MLB statistics
- Batting average: .215
- Home runs: 2
- Runs batted in: 14
- Stats at Baseball Reference

Teams
- Boston Braves (1931); St. Louis Cardinals (1932–33, 1935)

Charles Woodrow Wilson (January 13, 1905 – December 19, 1970) was a professional baseball player. Nicknamed "Swamp Baby", he played parts of four seasons in Major League Baseball for the Boston Braves and St. Louis Cardinals, mostly as either a shortstop or third baseman.
