= Rogers Reds =

- 1934–1938; Rogers, Arkansas

Minor league affiliations
- Previous classes: Class D
- League: Arkansas–Missouri League (1936–1938)
- Previous leagues: Arkansas State League (1934–1935)

Major league affiliations
- Previous teams: Cincinnati Reds (1938); St. Louis Cardinals (1935)

Minor league titles
- League titles: 1934, 1935, 1937

Team data
- Previous names: Rogers Reds (1938); Rogers Lions (1936–1937); Rogers Cardinals (1935); Rogers Rustlers (1934)

The Rogers Reds (also known as the Lions, Cardinals and the Rustlers) were a minor league baseball team that represented Rogers, Arkansas in the Arkansas–Missouri League and Arkansas State League from 1934 to 1938.
