= Lyle Judy =

American baseball player (1913–1991)

- Second baseman
- Born: November 15, 1913; Lawrenceville, Illinois, U.S.
- Died: January 15, 1991 (aged 77); Ormond Beach, Florida, U.S.
- Batted: Right Threw: Right

MLB debut
- September 13, 1935, for the St. Louis Cardinals

Last MLB appearance
- September 29, 1935, for the St. Louis Cardinals

MLB statistics
- Batting average: .000
- Home runs: 0
- RBI: 0
- Stats at Baseball Reference

Teams
- St. Louis Cardinals (1935)

Lyle Leroy "Punch" Judy (November 15, 1913 – January 15, 1991) was an American right-handed Major League Baseball second baseman who played for the St. Louis Cardinals in 1935. Though his major league career was short, he spent 14 seasons in the minor leagues.

Before playing professionally, Judy attended DuPont Manual High School in Louisville, Kentucky. He began his professional career in 1934, making his major league debut one year later on September 17, 1935 at the age of 21. He appeared in eight games with the St. Louis Cardinals, and had 11 at-bats. He collected zero hits, however he did walk twice and score two runs. He played his final big league game on September 29, 1935.

Judy played every year in the minor leagues from 1934 to 1941 and again from 1946 to 1951. He surpassed the .300 batting average threshold four times with a high of .334. Overall, he batted .285 with 247 doubles, 51 triples and 21 home runs in 1,648 minor league games.

He managed the Hopkinsville Hoppers for part of the 1936 season.

He was interred at San Lorenzo Cemetery in St. Augustine, Florida after his death.
