= Huntsville Red Birds =

- 1935; Huntsville, Arkansas

Minor league affiliations
- Previous classes: Class D (1935)
- League: Arkansas State League (1935)

Major league affiliations
- Previous teams: St. Louis Cardinals (1935)

Minor league titles
- League titles: None

Team data
- Previous parks: Unknown (1935)

The Huntsville Red Birds were a minor league baseball team that represented Huntsville, Arkansas in the Arkansas State League during the 1935 baseball season. The franchise relocated to become the Monett Red Birds for the 1936 season.

== History ==
Minor league baseball began in Huntsville, Arkansas when the 1935 Huntsville "Red Birds" began play as a minor league affiliate of the St. Louis Cardinals.

Huntsville became members of the six–team Class D level Arkansas State League and placed last in the standings in their one season of minor league play. Huntsville ended the 1935 Arkansas State League season with a record of 41–63, to place 6th in the Arkansas State League standings. Huntsville finished 22.5 games behind the 1st place Siloam Springs Travelers and were managed by James Nicely, Charley Wilson, George Ruff and William Werner.

After the 1935 season, the franchise relocated to become the Monett Red Birds for the 1936 season. As a result of the move, the Arkansas State League became the Arkansas-Missouri League beginning in 1936.

Huntsville, Arkansas has not hosted another minor league team.

== Year–by–year record ==
Year	Record	Finish	Manager	Playoffs/Notes
1935	41–63	6th	James Nicely / Charley Wilson; George Ruff / William Werner	None

== Notable alumni ==
No alumni of the 1935 Huntsville Red Birds advanced to the major leagues.
