= Ed Hawk =

American baseball player (1888-1936)

- Pitcher
- Born: February 22, 1888; Exeter, Missouri, U.S.
- Died: March 26, 1936 (aged 48); Neosho, Missouri, U.S.
- Batted: Left Threw: Right

MLB debut
- September 7, 1911, for the St. Louis Browns

Last MLB appearance
- October 7, 1911, for the St. Louis Browns

MLB statistics
- Win–loss record: 0-4
- Earned run average: 3.35
- Strikeouts: 14
- Stats at Baseball Reference

Teams
- St. Louis Browns (1911)

Edward Hawk (February 22, 1888 – March 26, 1936) was an American pitcher in Major League Baseball. He played for the St. Louis Browns in 1911.
