= Argenta Shamrocks =

- 1908–1909; Argenta, Arkansas

Minor league affiliations
- Previous classes: Class D
- League: Arkansas State League

The Argenta Shamrocks were a Minor League Baseball team that represented Argenta, Arkansas in the Arkansas State League in 1908 and 1909.
