= Helena Seaporters =

- 1908–1949; (1908-1909, 1911, 1935-1941, 1947-1949); Helena, Arkansas

Minor league affiliations
- Previous classes: Class C (1935-1941, 1947-1949); Class D (1908-1909, 1911)
- League: Cotton States League (1936-1941, 1947-1949)
- Previous leagues: East Dixie League (1935); Northeast Arkansas League (1911); Arkansas State League (1908-1909)

Major league affiliations
- Previous teams: Cincinnati Reds (1939); Chicago Cubs (1938)

Team data
- Previous names: Helena Seaporters (1935-1941, 1947-1949); Helena Hustlers (1911); Helena Hellions (1908-1909)

The Helena Seaporters were a minor league baseball team that represented Helena, Arkansas and played in the Cotton States League from 1935 to 1949.

A previous team, the Helena Hellions, played in the Arkansas State League in 1908 and 1909.
