= Louisiana State Baseball League =

Defunct minor league baseball team

Louisiana State League
- Classification: Class D (1915, 1920)
- Sport: Minor League Baseball
- First season: 1915
- Folded: July 14, 1920
- President: Jay Davidson (1920)
- No. of teams: 6
- Country: United States of America
- Most titles: 1 Oakdale Lumberjacks (1920)

The Louisiana State League was a minor league baseball league, with league franchises based in Louisiana. The league had two incarnations, each lasting for one year. The league fielded teams in both 1915 and 1920.

== History ==
The teams and standings of the 1915 league are unknown.

The 1920 league was a six–team Class D level minor league based in Louisiana, United States.

The League began play on April 20, 1920 and permanently folded on July 14, 1920. The Oakdale Lumberjacks were in 1st place with a 37–24 overall record when the league folded. Oakdale had won the first–half title and the Abbeville Sluggers had the best second–half record when the league folded. The New Iberia and Rayne franchised had simultaneously folded on July 6, 1920. Oakdale had a record of 37–24, playing under manager Louis Bremerhof, when the Louisiana State League League folded. The Lumberjackes finished 1.0 game ahead 2nd place New Iberia Sugar Boys (36–25). They were followed by the Lafayette Hubs (36–31), Abbeville Sluggers (33–35), Rayne Rice Birds (30–33) and Alexandria Tigers (23–47) in the final 1920 Louisiana State League standings.

== Cities represented ==
- Abbeville, LA: Abbeville Sluggers (1920)
- Alexandria, LA: Alexandria Tigers (1920)
- Lafayette, LA: Lafayette Hubs (1920)
- New Iberia, LA: New Iberia Sugar Boys (1920)
- Oakdale, LA: Oakdale Lumberjacks (1920)
- Rayne, LA: Rayne Rice Birds (1920)

== Standings and statistics ==
1920 Louisiana State League - schedule

| Team standings | W | L | GB | Pct. | Manager |
|---|---|---|---|---|---|
| Oakdale Lumberjacks | 37 | 24 | .607 | - | Lew Bremerhoff |
| Lafayette Hubs | 36 | 31 | .537 | 4.0 | Charlie French / Buck Danville |
| Abbeville Sluggers | 33 | 35 | .485 | 7.5 | F. DeMay / Lefty Hebert / Schaffer |
| Alexandria Tigers | 23 | 47 | .329 | 19.5 | John Carbo / G. Harris / Henry Chelette |
| Rayne Rice Birds | 30 | 33 | .476 | NA | G.C. Kitty Knight |
| New Iberia Sugar Boys | 36 | 25 | .590 | NA | Dan Gandolfi |

Oakdale lost seven wins due to ineligible players.
Rayne and New Iberia disbanded July 6.
The league disbanded July 15.
