= Cliff Knox =

American baseball player (1902–1965)

Clifford H. Knox
- Catcher
- Born: January 7, 1902; Coalville, Iowa, U.S.
- Died: September 24, 1965 (aged 63); Oskaloosa, Iowa, U.S.
- Batted: Both Threw: Right

MLB debut
- July 1, 1924, for the Pittsburgh Pirates

Last MLB appearance
- July 14, 1924, for the Pittsburgh Pirates

MLB statistics
- Batting average: .222
- Home runs: 0
- Runs batted in: 2
- Stats at Baseball Reference

Teams
- Pittsburgh Pirates (1924)

Clifford Hiram Knox (January 7, 1902 – September 24, 1965) was an American professional baseball player. Nicknamed "Bud", he was a catcher for one season (1924) with the Pittsburgh Pirates. For his career, he compiled a .222 batting average in 18 at-bats, with two runs batted in.

He was born in Coalville, Iowa and died in Oskaloosa, Iowa at the age of 63.
