= Camden Ouachitas =

- 1884–1906; (1894, 1906); Camden, Arkansas

Minor league affiliations
- Class: Class D (1894, 1906)
- League: Arkansas State League (1894); Arkansas-Texas League (1906)

Major league affiliations
- Team: None

Minor league titles
- League titles (0): None

Team data
- Name: Camden Yellow Hammers (1893–1894); Camden Ouachitas (1906)
- Ballpark: Recreation Park (1894)

The Camden Ouachitas were a minor league baseball team based in Camden, Arkansas. In 1906, the Camden Ouachitas played as members of the Class D level Arkansas-Texas League, ending the season in third place. The Ouachitas were preceded in minor league play by the 1894 Camden Yellow Hammers, who played as members of the Class D level Arkansas State League in 1894.

Camden hosted home minor league games at Recreation Park.

== History ==
After fielding a semi-pro team in 1893, minor league baseball first came to Camden, Arkansas when the 1894 Camden Yellow Hammers became members of the Class D level Arkansas State League. The league began play on May 30, 1894. The Camden franchise, along with the Hot Springs, Arkansas based Hot Springs Bathers franchise, both folded one month into the 1894 season, causing the four–team league to fold. Camden, also referred to as the "Rainmakers" by some references, finished with a 7–10 record to place third in the league standings. Camden finished 4½ games behind the first place Little Rock Rose Buds, who ended with an 11–5 record.

In 1906, the Camden "Ouachitas" became charter members of the Class D level Arkansas-Texas League. Camden was joined by the Hot Springs Vapors, Pine Bluff Barristers and Texarkana Shine-Oners as the charter members of the four–team league.

The Camden "Ouachitas" moniker corresponds to Camden being within Ouachita County and the Ouachita River that runs east of the city.

Beginning league play on June 21, 1906, Camden ended the Arkansas-Texas League regular season with a record of 29–28. Camden finished in second place in the final standings, playing under managers Arthur Riggs and Cleve Turner. The Camden Ouachitas finished 2½ games behind the first place Pine Bluff Barristers (32–26) and ahead of the third place Texarkana Shine-Oners/Hope Tigers (29–30) and Hot Springs Vapors (25–32) in the final standings.

Camden, Arkansas has not hosted another minor league team.

== The ballpark ==
The 1894 Camden Yellow Hammers played minor league home games at Recreation Park.

== Timeline ==
| Year(s) | # Yrs. | Team | Level | League |
|---|---|---|---|---|
| 1894 | 1 | Camden Yellow Hammers | Class D | Arkansas State League |
| 1906 | 1 | Camden Ouachitas | Class D | Arkansas-Texas League |

== Year–by–year records ==
| Year | Record | Finish | Manager | Playoffs/Notes |
|---|---|---|---|---|
| 1894 | 7–10 | 3rd | NA | Team and League folded |
| 1906 | 29–28 | 2nd | Arthur Riggs / Cleve Turner | No playoffs held |

== Notable alumni ==
- Ralph McLaurin (1906)
- Camden Ouachitas players
