= Loy Hanning =

American baseball player (1917-1986)

- Pitcher
- Born: October 18, 1917; Bunker, Missouri, U.S.
- Died: June 24, 1986 (aged 68); Washington, Missouri, U.S.
- Batted: Right Threw: Right

MLB debut
- September 20, 1939, for the St. Louis Browns

Last MLB appearance
- July 25, 1942, for the St. Louis Browns

MLB statistics
- Win–loss record: 1–2
- Strikeouts: 17
- Earned run average: 6.26
- Stats at Baseball Reference

Teams
- St. Louis Browns (1939, 1942)

Loy Vernon Hanning (October 18, 1917 – June 24, 1986) was an American Major League Baseball pitcher. He played parts of two seasons in the majors, 1939 and 1942, for the St. Louis Browns.

== Sources ==
- Career statistics from Baseball Reference · Baseball Reference (Minors) · Retrosheet · Baseball Almanac
