= Frank Oceak =

- Coach
- Born: September 8, 1912; Pocahontas, Virginia, U.S.
- Died: March 19, 1983 (aged 70); Johnstown, Pennsylvania, U.S.
- Batted: Right Threw: Right
- Stats at Baseball Reference

Teams
- Pittsburgh Pirates (1958–1964; 1970–1972); Cincinnati Reds (1965)

Frank John Oceak (September 8, 1912 – March 19, 1983) was an American professional baseball player and coach. He was an infielder and manager in minor league baseball and served as a coach in Major League Baseball for 11 seasons between 1958 and 1972. A trusted confidant of four-time Pittsburgh Pirates manager Danny Murtaugh, Oceak was coaching at third base on October 13, 1960, during Game 7 of the 1960 World Series, when Pirate second baseman Bill Mazeroski hit his dramatic walk-off home run to clinch the Series against the New York Yankees. Oceak, wearing uniform #44, can be seen in many of the films and still photos of the historic event, celebrating with Mazeroski as he rounds third base and following him to home plate.

Frank Oceak was born in Pocahontas, Virginia. He batted and threw right-handed, and stood 5 feet 9 inches (1.75 m) tall and weighed 172 pounds (78 kg). Primarily a second baseman and shortstop, Oceak spent his entire playing career (1932–40; 1942–43; 1946–47) in the lower minor leagues, briefly as a member of the Yankees' farm system. He became a player-manager at age 25 in 1938 with the Lafayette White Sox of the Class D Evangeline League—which was, despite its nickname, an affiliate of the St. Louis Browns. Two years later, as manager of the Beaver Falls Browns of the Class D Pennsylvania State Association, Oceak was suspended by Commissioner of Baseball Kenesaw Mountain Landis for the entire 1941 season for an assault on an umpire. However, Oceak resumed his playing and managing careers in 1942 with the Oil City Oilers of the PSA, his first assignment in the Pirates' organization, where he would spend most of the rest of his baseball life.

The bulk of his managing career, as in his playing days, took place in the lower minors, until 1957 when he was named skipper of the Columbus Jets of the Triple-A International League, one of the Pirates' two top-tier farm clubs. The following season, he was named to Murtaugh's coaching staff, serving for seven seasons as the Bucs' third base coach before Murtaugh resigned because of ill health at the close of the 1964 campaign. Oceak then spent one season, 1965, with the Cincinnati Reds as a coach under Dick Sisler before returning to Pittsburgh as a minor league manager at the Class A and Double-A levels from 1966–69.

In 1970, Murtaugh returned to the dugout as manager of the Pirates, and Oceak rejoined him as third-base coach. He served through another world championship with the 1971 Pirates. When Murtaugh retired in the days after the 1971 World Series, Oceak stayed on for one more season as a coach under Bill Virdon before leaving baseball. He died in Johnstown, Pennsylvania, at the age of 70.

His career record as a minor league manager was 1,285 victories, and 1,386 defeats (.481).

Preceded by Danny Murtaugh; Alex Grammas	Pittsburgh Pirates third-base coach 1958–1964; 1970–1972	Succeeded by Alex Grammas; Bill Mazeroski
Preceded by Reggie Otero	Cincinnati Reds third-base coach 1965	Succeeded by Dave Bristol
