= Dennis Burns =

American baseball player (1898-1969)

- Pitcher
- Born: May 24, 1898; Tiff City, Missouri, U.S.
- Died: May 21, 1969 (aged 70); Tulsa, Oklahoma, U.S.
- Batted: Right Threw: Right

MLB debut
- September 19, 1923, for the Philadelphia Athletics

Last MLB appearance
- September 26, 1924, for the Philadelphia Athletics

MLB statistics
- Win–loss record: 8–9
- Earned run average: 4.62
- Strikeouts: 34
- Stats at Baseball Reference

Teams
- Philadelphia Athletics (1923–1924)

Dennis Burns (May 24, 1898 – May 21, 1969) was an American professional baseball player. He was a right-handed pitcher over parts of two seasons (1923–24) with the Philadelphia Athletics. For his career, he compiled an 8–9 record, with a 4.62 earned run average, and 34 strikeouts in 181 innings pitched. He was an alumnus of the University of Missouri.
