= Abbeville Sluggers =

- 1920–1920; (1920); Abbeville, Louisiana

Minor league affiliations
- Previous classes: Class D (1920)
- League: Louisiana State League (1920)

The Abbeville Sluggers were a minor league baseball team, based in Abbeville, Louisiana that played in the Louisiana State League in 1920.
