= Rayne Rice Birds =

- 1920–1941; (1920, 1934–1941); Rayne, Louisiana

Minor league affiliations
- Previous classes: Class D
- League: Evangeline League (1934–1941)
- Previous leagues: Louisiana State League (1920)

Major league affiliations
- Previous teams: Chicago White Sox/Brooklyn Dodgers (1940); Chicago White Sox (1936–1939)

Team data
- Previous names: Rayne Rice Birds (1920, 1935–1941); Rayne Red Sox (1934)

The Rayne Rice Birds were a minor league baseball team that existed from 1934 to 1941. In 1934, they were known as the Rayne Red Sox and from 1935 to 1941 known as the Rice Birds. They played in the Evangeline League and were affiliated with the Chicago White Sox and Brooklyn Dodgers.

A previous version of the Rice Birds played in the Louisiana State League in 1920.

== See also ==
- Category:Rayne Red Sox players
- Category:Rayne Rice Birds players
