= Ray Powell (baseball) =

American baseball player (1888–1962)

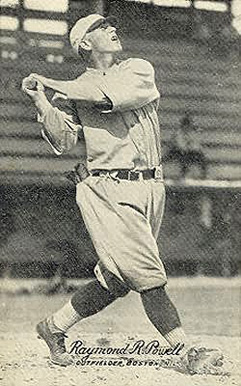
- Outfielder
- Born: November 20, 1888; Siloam Springs, Arkansas, U.S.
- Died: October 16, 1962 (aged 73); Chillicothe, Missouri, U.S.
- Batted: Left Threw: Right

MLB debut
- April 16, 1913, for the Detroit Tigers

Last MLB appearance
- September 28, 1924, for the Boston Braves

MLB statistics
- Batting average: .268
- Home runs: 35
- Runs batted in: 276
- Stats at Baseball Reference

Teams
- Detroit Tigers (1913); Boston Braves (1917–1924)

Raymond Reath Powell (November 20, 1888 – October 16, 1962) was an American professional baseball player who played outfield in the Major Leagues from 1913-1924. Powell played for the Detroit Tigers and Boston Braves.

In 875 games over 9 seasons, Powell posted a .268 batting average (890-for-3324) with 467 runs, 117 doubles, 67 triples, 35 home runs, 276 RBI, 51 stolen bases, 321 bases on balls, .336 on-base percentage and .375 slugging percentage. He finished his career with a .959 fielding percentage playing at all three outfield positions.
