= Arkansas State League =

- Classification: Independent (1894, 1897); Class D (1908–1909, 1934–1935)
- Sport: Minor League Baseball
- First season: 1894
- Folded: 1935
- Replaced by: Arkansas-Missouri League
- President: Harry S. Edwards (1897); T. J. Craighead (1908); W. W. Hurst (1909); R. M. Rider (1909); Frank E. Matthews (1934); Charles Morgan (1934–1935)
- No. of teams: 22
- Country: United States of America
- Most titles: 2 Little Rock 1894, 1897; Rogers (1934–1935)
- Related competitions: Northeast Arkansas League; Arkansas-Texas League

The Arkansas State League was an American minor league baseball league that played in various seasons between 1894 and 1935, forming three different times. The first version was in operation in 1894, followed by an 1897 league. The Class D level league operated from 1908 to 1909 in Arkansas and Louisiana and also in 1934 to 1935 in Arkansas and Missouri. In 1936, the league evolved to become the Arkansas-Missouri League. Little Rock and Rogers each won two league championships.

== Cities represented ==
- Alexandria, Louisiana: Alexandria Hoo Hoos (1909)
- Argenta, Arkansas: Argenta (1908); Argenta Shamrocks (1909)
- Bentonville, Arkansas: Bentonville Officeholders (1934–1935)
- Brinkley, Arkansas: Brinkley Infants (1908)
- Camden, Arkansas: Camden Rainmakers (1894)
- Cassville, Missouri: Cassville Tigers (1935)
- Fayetteville, Arkansas: Fayetteville Educators (1934); Fayetteville Bears (1935)
- Fort Smith, Arkansas: Fort Smith Indians (1894, 1897); Ft. Smith Soldiers (1909)
- Helena, Arkansas: Helena Ponies (1908); Helena Hellions (1909)
- Hot Springs, Arkansas: Hot Springs Bathers (1894, 1897); Hot Springs Giants (1908); Hot Springs Vaporites (1909)
- Huntsville, Arkansas: Huntsville Red Birds (1935)
- Jonesboro, Arkansas: Jonesboro Zebras (1909)
- Little Rock, Arkansas: Little Rock Rose Buds (1894); Little Rock Senators (1897)
- Monroe, Louisiana: Monroe Municipals (1909)
- Morrilton, Arkansas: Morrilton Cotton Pickers (1894)
- Newport, Arkansas & Batesville, Arkansas: Newport Pearl Diggers 1908; Newport-Batesville Pearl Diggers (1909)
- Pine Bluff, Arkansas: Pine Bluff Pine Knotts (1908)
- Poplar Bluff, Missouri: Poplar Bluff Tigers (1908)
- Rogers, Arkansas: Rogers Rustlers (1934); Rogers Cardinals (1935)
- Siloam Springs, Arkansas: Siloam Springs Buffaloes (1934); Siloam Springs Travelers (1935)
- Texarkana, Arkansas: Texarkana (1894); Texarkana Nobles (1897)
- Texarkana, Texas: Texarkana (1909)

== Standings & statistics ==
=== 1894 & 1897 ===
1894 Arkansas State League

| Team standings | W | L | PCT | GB | Manager |
|---|---|---|---|---|---|
| Little Rock Rose Buds | 11 | 5 | .688 | - | NA |
| Morrilton Cotton Pickers | 10 | 5 | .667 | ½ | Massey |
| Camden Rainmakers | 7 | 10 | .412 | 4½ | NA |
| Hot Springs Bathers | 3 | 11 | .214 | 7 | NA |
| Fort Smith Indians | NA | NA | NA | NA | Rogers |
| Texarkana | NA | NA | NA | NA | NA |

Season ended June 23
1897 Arkansas State League

| Team standings | W | L | PCT | GB | Managers |
|---|---|---|---|---|---|
| Little Rock Senators | 21 | 7 | .750 | - | Harry Edwards |
| Hot Springs Bathers | 17 | 15 | .531 | 6 | Dudley Payne |
| Fort Smith Indians | 15 | 23 | .395 | 10 | Hardin |
| Texarkana Nobles | 9 | 23 | .281 | 14 | Thomas Browner |

League disbanded August 18; Little Rock and Hot Springs played a 21-game finals series

=== 1908 & 1909 ===
1908 Arkansas State League

| Team standings | W | L | PCT | GB | Managers |
|---|---|---|---|---|---|
| Hot Springs Giants | 78 | 38 | .672 | - | Arthur Riggs / W. Forbes |
| Newport Pearl Diggers | 65 | 44 | .596 | 9½ | Robert Shelton |
| Helena Ponies | 67 | 48 | .583 | 10½ | Rudolph Kling |
| Pine Bluff Pine Knotts | 51 | 61 | .455 | 24 | Walter Deaver / Al Sullivan |
| Argenta Shamrocks | 49 | 68 | .419 | 28½ | James Kerwin / Roy Geyer; Charles Reece / Arthur Riggs |
| Poplar Bluff Tigers / Brinkley Infants | 28 | 79 | .262 | 45½ | Al Sullivan / Lee Dawkins |

Poplar Bluff was replaced by Brinkley June 8. No playoffs scheduled.

Player statistics
| Player | Team | Stat | Tot | Player | Team | Stat | Tot |
|---|---|---|---|---|---|---|---|
| Elmer Coyle | Hot Springs | BA | .376 | Lucky Wright | Hot Springs | W | 27 |
| Elmer Coyle | Hot Springs | Runs | 134 | Hippo Vaughn | Hot Springs | Pct | .900; 9-1 |
| Elmer Coyle | Hot Springs | Hits | 178 | Herbert Benham | Helena | SB | 65 |

1909 Arkansas State League

| Team standings | W | L | PCT | GB | Managers |
|---|---|---|---|---|---|
| Jonesboro Zebras | 42 | 27 | .609 | - | Senter Rainey / Harry Welch |
| Helena Hellions | 39 | 25 | .609 | ½ | C. A. Vandergriff |
| Texarkana | 34 | 35 | .493 | 8 | Robert Shelton |
| Hot Springs Vaporites | 33 | 37 | .471 | 9½ | Arthur Riggs / Elmer Coyle |
| Monroe Municipals / Newport-Batesville Pearl Diggers | 25 | 38 | .397 | 14 | W. Dobard |
| Ft. Smith Soldiers | 27 | 42 | .391 | 15 | Hugo Bezdek / Dad Ritter |
| Argenta Shamrocks | 26 | 19 | .578 | NA | Dad Ritter |
| Alexandria Hoo Hoos | 20 | 23 | .465 | NA | John Auslet |

Argenta & Alexandria disbanded June 7; Monroe moved to Newport-Batesville July 1.
League disbanded July 7.

=== 1934 & 1935 ===
1934 Arkansas State League
The Arkansas State League reformed with four teams. Franchises based in Bentonville, Arkansas, Fayetteville, Arkansas, Rogers, Arkansas, and Siloam Springs, Arkansas joined. The winners of the first and second halves of the season played for the league championship at the end of the year.

| Team standings | W | L | PCT | GB | Managers |
|---|---|---|---|---|---|
| Bentonville Officeholders | 40 | 35 | .533 | - | Red Wilson / Tom McGill / Ed Hawk |
| Siloam Springs Buffaloes | 37 | 34 | .521 | 1 | Clyde Glass |
| Rogers Rustlers | 36 | 35 | .507 | 2 | Ed Hawk / Pete Casey |
| Fayetteville Educators | 33 | 42 | .440 | 7 | Fred Hawn / Frank Matthews |

Playoff: Rogers defeated Siloam Springs 5–2 in a one-game playoff for the first half title. Bentonville was declared second half winner when Fayetteville and Siloam Springs folded August 19.
Finals: Rogers defeated Bentonville 4 games to 3

Player statistics
| Player | Team | Stat | Tot | Player | Team | Stat | Tot |
|---|---|---|---|---|---|---|---|
| John Graves | Siloam Springs | BA | .387 | Maurice Wollard | Bentonville | W | 12 |
| Bill Beams | Bentonville | Runs | 61 | Everette Hill | Siloam Springs | Pct | .889; 8-1 |
| Parker Rushing | Fayetteville | Hits | 96 | Bill Beams | Bentonville | HR | 12 |
| Clyde Glass | Siloam Springs | RBI | 67 | | | | |

1935 Arkansas State League
The league expanded, adding the franchises in Cassville, Missouri and Huntsville, Arkansas to expand from four teams to six teams.

| Team standings | W | L | PCT | GB | Managers |
|---|---|---|---|---|---|
| Siloam Springs Travelers | 66 | 43 | .606 | - | Ray Powell |
| Rogers Cardinals | 59 | 50 | .541 | 7 | Fred Cato / Frank Stapleton |
| Cassville Tigers | 54 | 48 | .529 | 8½ | Ed Hawk |
| Bentonville Officeholders | 51 | 56 | .477 | 14 | Bud Davis |
| Fayetteville Bears | 45 | 56 | .446 | 17 | Lyle Casey / Fred Cato |
| Huntsville Red Birds | 41 | 63 | .394 | 22½ | Jim Nicely / Charles Wilson; Bill Werner |

Playoff: Rogers (1st half winner) defeated Siloam Springs (2nd half winner) 4 games to 3.

All teams continued play in the renamed 1936 Arkansas–Missouri League. The Arkansas State League folded.

Player statistics
| Player | Team | Stat | Tot | Player | Team | Stat | Tot |
|---|---|---|---|---|---|---|---|
| Duane Kratzer | Cassville | BA | .397 | Jumbo Brown | Bentonville | W | 20 |
| Howard Roberts | Cassville | Runs | 89 | George Gibson | Bentonville | W | 20 |
| Wilbur Davis | Bentonville | Hits | 146 | Johnny John | Cassville | SO | 147 |
| Wilbur Davis | Bentonville | RBI | 93 | Jumbo Brown | Bentonville | ERA | 2.97 |
| Howard Roberts | Cassville | HR | 21 | | | | |
