= Bentonville Mustangs =

- 1934–1936; Bentonville, Arkansas

Minor league affiliations
- Previous classes: Class D
- League: Arkansas–Missouri League (1936)
- Previous leagues: Arkansas State League (1934–1935)

Major league affiliations
- Previous teams: St. Louis Cardinals (1935)

The Bentonville Mustangs (previously the Bentonville Officeholders), based in Bentonville, Arkansas, were a minor league baseball team that played in the Arkansas State League in 1934 and 1935 and the Arkansas–Missouri League in 1936.
