= List of sports teams in Louisiana =

This is a list of sports teams in Louisiana.

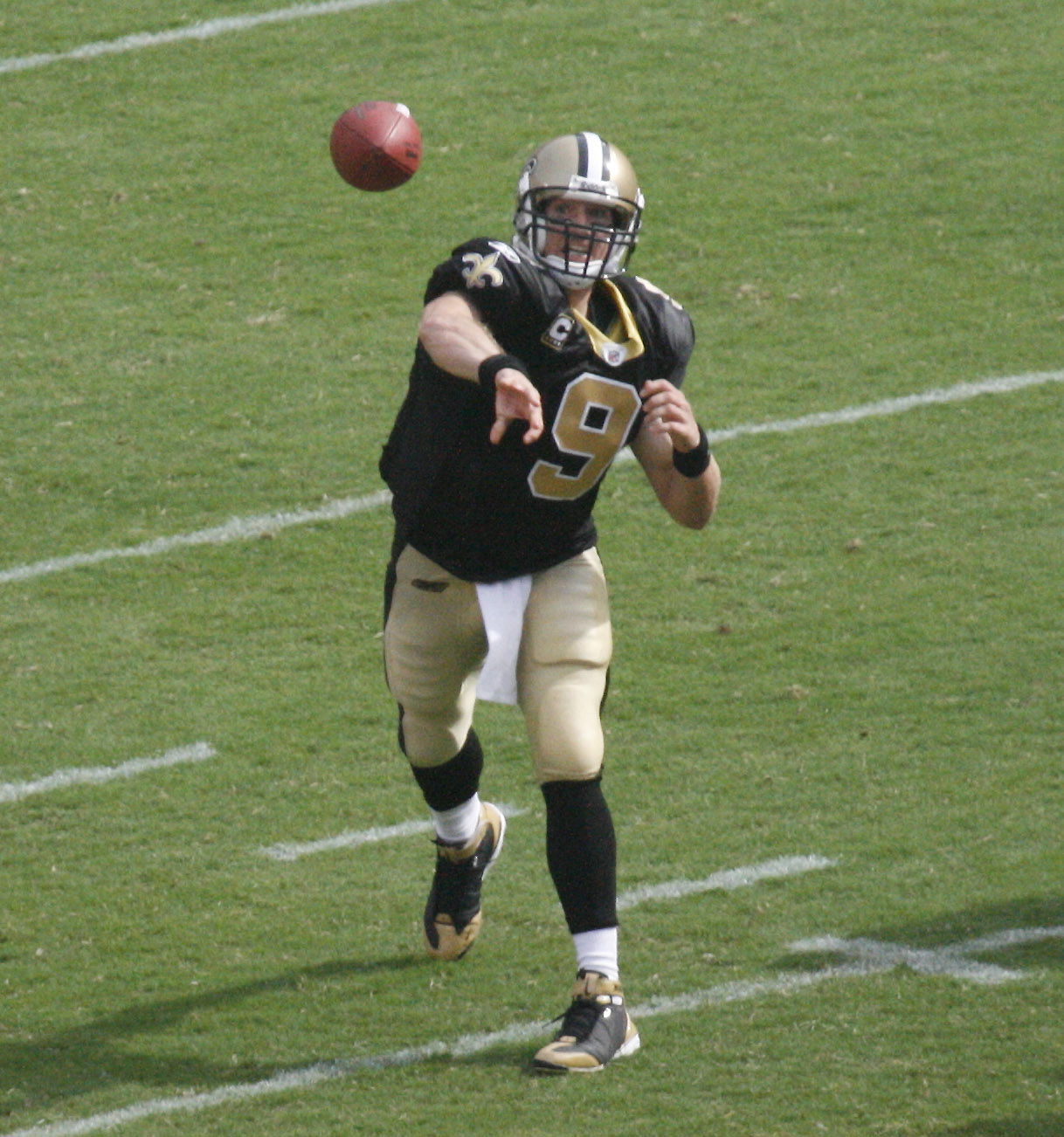
New Orleans Saints quarterback Drew Brees

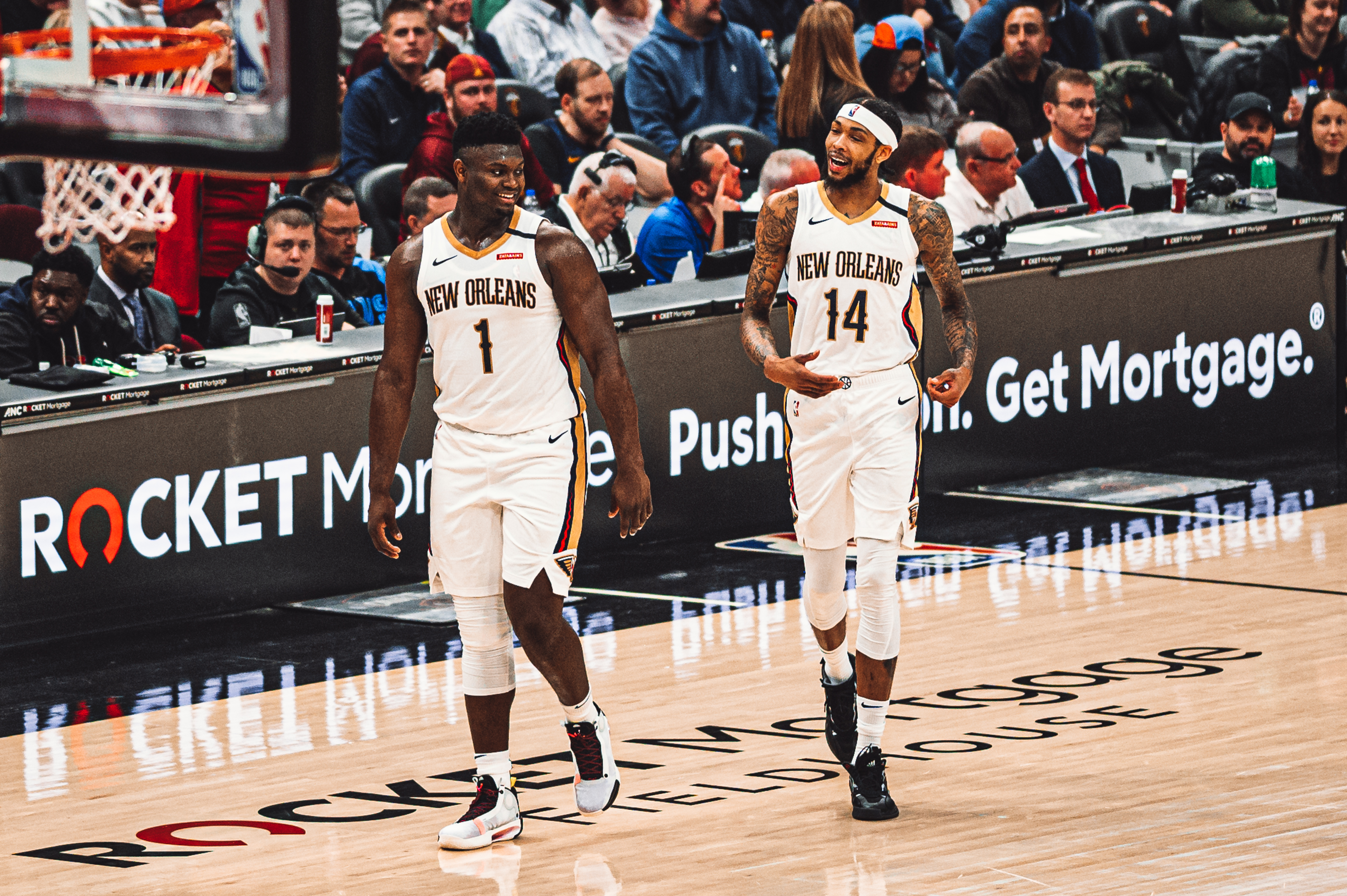
New Orleans Pelicans players Zion Williamson and Brandon Ingram

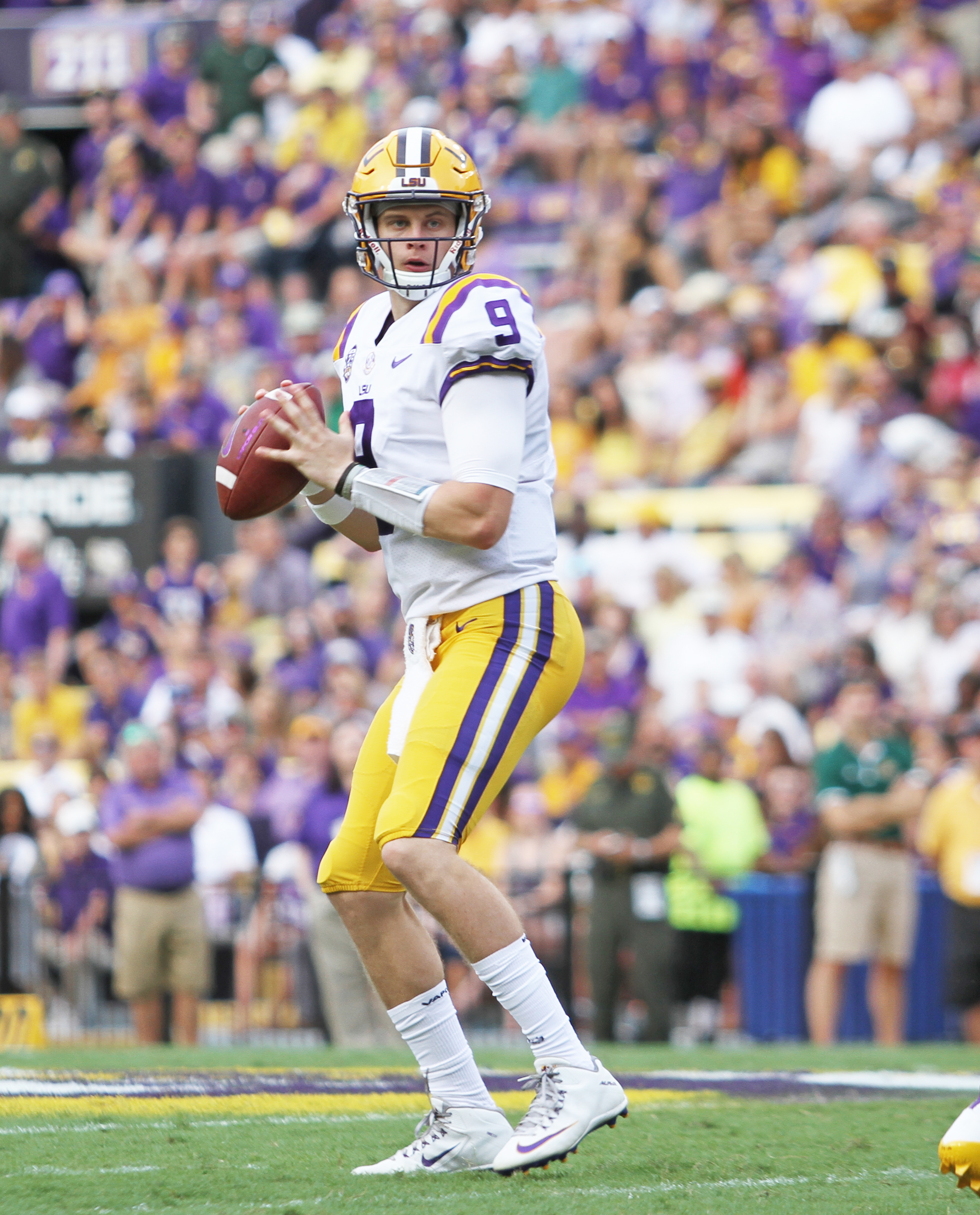
Former LSU quarterback Joe Burrow

== Professional teams ==
Current Teams

| Sport | Club | League |
|---|---|---|
| American football | New Orleans Saints | National Football League |
| Basketball | New Orleans Pelicans | National Basketball Association |
| Rugby union | New Orleans Gold | Major League Rugby |

== Amateur/Semi-Pro sports teams ==
=== American football ===
Women's Football Alliance

- Louisiana Bayou Storm Surge
- New Orleans Hurricanes

North Louisiana Football Alliance

- Bossier City Bombers
- Bossier City Roughnecks
- Homer Lumberjacks
- Minden Cyclones
- Ruston Rattlers

=== Australian football ===
United States Australian Football League

- Baton Rouge Tigers

=== Baseball ===
Texas Collegiate League

- Acadiana Cane Cutters

=== Basketball ===
American Basketball Association

- Alexandria Armor
- Louisiana Kingdom Riders
- Twin City Jazz

=== Hockey ===
Federal Prospects Hockey League

- Baton Rouge Zydeco
- Monroe Moccasins (FPHL)

North American Hockey League

- Shreveport Mudbugs

=== Roller derby ===
Women's Flat Track Derby Association

- Acadiana Rollergirls (Lafayette)
- Big Easy Rollergirls (New Orleans)
- Cajun Rollergirls (Houma)
- Red Stick Roller Derby (Baton Rouge)

Men's Roller Derby Association

- New Orleans Brass Roller Derby (New Orleans)

Independent

- Cenla Derby Dames (Alexandria)
- Lethal Ladies/NSRD (Mandeville/Madisonville)
- Pearl River Roller Derby (Slidell)
- Twin City Knockers (Shreveport/Bossier)

=== Rugby ===
Deep South Rugby Football Union

- Baton Rouge Rugby Football Club
- New Orleans Rugby Football Club

Texas Geographical Union

- Shreveport Rugby Football Club

=== Soccer ===
National Premier Soccer League

- New Orleans Jesters

Gulf Coast Premier League

- Alexandria PBFC (Alexandria)
- Baton Rouge Capitals
- CABOSA Shreveport United S.C.
- Cajun Rush (Lafayette)
- Crescent City FC (New Orleans)
- Louisiana Krewe (Lafayette)
- Northshore United FC (Covington)

== College teams ==
=== NCAA ===
Division I Football Bowl Subdivision

- Bulldogs and Lady Techsters – Louisiana Tech University – Sun Belt Conference
- Green Wave – Tulane University – American Conference (NCAA)
- Ragin' Cajuns – University of Louisiana at Lafayette – Sun Belt Conference
- Tigers and Lady Tigers – Louisiana State University – Southeastern Conference
- Warhawks – University of Louisiana at Monroe – Sun Belt Conference

Division I Football Championship Subdivision

- Colonels – Nicholls State University – Southland Conference
- Cowboys and Cowgirls – McNeese State University – Southland Conference
- Demons and Lady Demons – Northwestern State University – Southland Conference
- Jaguars and Lady Jaguars – Southern University – Southwestern Athletic Conference
- Lions and Lady Lions – Southeastern Louisiana University – Southland Conference
- Privateers – LSU New Orleans – Southland Conference
- Tigers – Grambling State University – Southwestern Athletic Conference

Division III

- Gentlemen and Ladies – Centenary College of Louisiana – Southern Collegiate Athletic Conference

=== NAIA ===
- Wildcats and Lady Wildcats – Louisiana Christian University
- Bleu Devils and Lady Bleu Devils – Dillard University
- Generals – Louisiana State University of Alexandria
- Gold Rush and Gold Nuggets – Xavier University of Louisiana
- Knights and Lady Knights – Southern University at New Orleans
- Pilots – Louisiana State University Shreveport
- Wolf Pack – Loyola University New Orleans

=== NJCAA ===
- Bears – Baton Rouge Community College
- Bengals – Louisiana State University at Eunice
- Cavaliers – Bossier Parish Community College
- Dolphins – Delgado Community College
- Jaguars – Southern University at Shreveport
- Pelicans – Nunez Community College

== Defunct professional and amateur/semi-pro teams ==
=== Defunct American football teams ===
- Acadiana Zydeco (2010–2019) – WFA
- Baton Rouge Blaze (2001) – af2
- Bossier–Shreveport Battle Wings – (2001–2009) – af2, (2010) – AFL
- Cenla Twin City/Louisiana Patriots - (2008-2010) - TLSWFA
- Hammond Heroes (2006) – NIFL
- Houma Bayou Bucks (2002–2005) – NIFL
- Houma Conquerors (2009) – SIFL
- Lafayette Roughnecks (2001) – af2
- Lafayette Wildcatters (2009–2010) – SIFL
- Lake Charles Land Sharks (2002–2004) – NIFL
- Louisiana Bayou Beast – (1998) – PIFL (1999) – IPFL, (2001) – NIFL
- Louisiana Fuel – (2008–2010) – IWFL
- Louisiana Jazz – (2002–2003) – NWFA, (2004–2014) – WFA
- Louisiana Rangers – (2000) – IPFL, (2001–2002) – NIFL
- Louisiana Swashbucklers – (2005) – NIFL, (2006–2008) – Intense, (2009–2011) – SIFL, (2012–2013) – PIFL
- New Orleans Breakers (1984) – USFL
- New Orleans Breakers (2022) – USFL
- New Orleans Jazz F.C. (2011) – Stars
- New Orleans Krewe (2016) - U.S. Women's Football League
- New Orleans Night (1991–1992) – AFL
- New Orleans Thunder (1999) – Regional
- New Orleans VooDoo (2004–2008), (2010–2015) – AFL
- Shreveport Aftershock – (2007–2009) – IWFL
- Shreveport-Bossier Bombers (2000) – IPFL
- Shreveport Knights (1999) – RFL
- Shreveport Pirates (1994–95) – CFL
- Shreveport Shockhers (2006) – NWFA
- Shreveport Steamer (1974–1975) – WFL
- Shreveport Steamers (1979–1981) – AFA
- Twin City Gators (2006) – NIFL

=== Defunct baseball teams ===
- Abbeville A's (1935–1939) – Evangeline League
- Abbeville Athletics (1946–1952) – Evangeline League
- Abbeville Sluggers (1920) – Louisiana State League
- Acadiana Cane Cutters (Lafayette) (2011–Current) – Texas Collegiate League
- Alexandria Aces (1934–1942, 1946–1957) – Evangeline League (1972–1975) – Texas League (1994–2001) – Texas–Louisiana League, (2001–2003) – Central League, (2006–2008) – United League, (2009) – Continental League, (2010–2012) – Texas Collegiate League, (2013) – United League
- Alexandria Black Aces – Negro league baseball
- Alexandria Hoo Hoos (1909) – Arkansas State League
- Alexandria Lincoln Giants – Negro league baseball
- Alexandria Reds (1925–1930) – Cotton States League
- Alexandria Tigers (1920) – Louisiana State League
- Alexandria White Sox (1907–1908) – Gulf Coast League
- Arlington/Blue Stockings Base Ball Club (Shreveport) (1872)
- Baton Rouge Black Sox – Negro league baseball
- Baton Rouge Blue Marlins (2001) – All-American Association
- Baton Rouge Cajuns (1902, 1905–1906) – Cotton States League
- Baton Rouge Cougars (1976) – Gulf States League
- Baton Rouge Essos (1929) – Cotton States League
- Baton Rouge Hardwood Sports – Negro league baseball
- Baton Rouge Highlanders (1930) – Cotton States League
- Baton Rouge Rebels (1956–57) – Evangeline League
- Baton Rouge Red Sticks (1903–1904) – Cotton States League (1934) East Dixie League (1946–55) – Evangeline League
- Baton Rouge Riverbats (2002–2003) – Southeastern League
- Baton Rouge Senators (1932) – Cotton States League
- Baton Rouge Solons (1933) – Dixie League
- Baton Rouge Standards (1931) – Cotton States League
- Baton Rouge Stars – Negro league baseball
- Bayou Bullfrogs (Lafayette) (1998–1999) – Texas–Louisiana League
- Beauregard Base Ball Club (Ponchatoula) (1870)
- Capitol/Red Stick Base Ball Club (Baton Rouge) (1867)
- Comet Base Ball Club (New Orleans) (1860)
- Crowley Millers (1950) – Gulf Coast League (1951–1957) – Evangeline League
- Crowley Rice Birds (1908) – Gulf Coast League
- Delta Base Ball Club (Delta) (1877)
- DeQuincy Railroaders (1932) – Cotton States League
- Detroit–New Orleans Stars (1960–1961) – Negro league baseball
- Donaldsonville Grays – Semi-pro baseball
- Favorite Base Ball Club (Lafayette) (1893)
- Ferriday Stars – Negro league baseball
- Gretna Lookouts – Negro league baseball
- Hammond Berries (1946–51) – Evangeline League
- Hammond Cubs – Negro league baseball
- Hammond Hard Hitters – Negro league baseball
- Hancock Base Ball Club (New Orleans) (1869)
- Hop Bitters Base Ball Club (New Orleans) (1880)
- Hope Base Ball Club (New Orleans) (1868)
- Houma Buccaneers/Natchez Pilgrims (1940) – Evangeline League
- Houma Delta Cubs – Negro league baseball
- Houma Hawks (2003) – Southeastern League
- Houma Indians (1946–1952) – Evangeline League
- Invincibles Base Ball Club (Royville) (1893)
- Jeanerette Blues (1934–1939) – Evangeline League
- Lafayette Browns (1908) – Gulf Coast League
- Lafayette Bullfrogs (2000) – Texas–Louisiana League
- Lafayette Bulls (1948–53) – Evangeline League
- Lafayette Drillers (1975–1976) – Texas League
- Lafayette Hubs (1920) – Louisiana State League
- Lafayette Oilers (1954–57) – Evangeline League
- Lafayette White Sox (1934–42) – Evangeline League
- Lake Charles Creoles (1906) – South Texas League (1907–1908) – Gulf Coast League
- Lake Charles Explorers (1934) – Evangeline League
- Lake Charles Giants (1956–57) – Evangeline League
- Lake Charles Lakers (1950) – Gulf Coast League (1951–55) – Evangeline League
- Lake Charles Lincoln Giants – Negro league baseball
- Lake Charles Newporters (1929–1930) – Cotton States League
- Lake Charles Skippers (1935–1942) – Evangeline League
- Leesville Angels (1950) – Gulf Coast League
- Lone Star Base Ball Club (Pineville) (1871)
- Lone Star Base Ball Club (New Orleans) (1859, 1869)
- Louisiana Travellers
- Mandeville Base Ball Club (Mandeville) (1869)
- Melpomene White Sox – Negro league baseball
- Meraux Tigers – Negro league baseball
- Metairie Pelicans – Negro league baseball
- Monroe Drillers (1924–1930) – Cotton States League
- Monroe Hill Citys (1903–1904) – Cotton States League
- Monroe Monarchs (1931–1932) – Negro Southern League
- Monroe Municipals (1907) – Gulf Coast League (1908) – Cotton States League
- Monroe Pearl Diggers (1909) – Arkansas State League
- Monroe Southern Giants (1923) – Texas Colored League
- Monroe Sports (1950–1955) – Cotton States League (1956) – Evangeline League
- Monroe Twins (1931–1932, 1937) – Cotton States League
- Monroe White Sox (1938–1941) – Cotton States League
- Morgan City Bears – Negro league baseball
- Morgan City Black Sox – Negro league baseball
- Morgan City Oyster Shuckers (1908) – Gulf Coast League
- Morehouse Bluffers Base Ball Club (Bastrop) (1879)
- Natchitoches Base Ball Club (Natchitoches) (1874)
- New Iberia Cardinals (1934–1942, 1946–1947, 1949, 1953) – Evangeline League
- New Iberia Indians (1956) – Evangeline League
- New Iberia Pelicans (1948, 1951–1952, 1954–1955) – Evangeline League
- New Iberia Rebels (1950) – Evangeline League
- New Iberia Sugar Boys (1920) – Louisiana State League
- New Orleans Acid Iron Earth (f. 1886) – Gulf League
- New Orleans Ads (1920–21, 1935–36) – Negro Southern League
- New Orleans Algiers Giants (1926) – Independent Negro leagues
- New Orleans Baseball Club (f. 1886) – Gulf League
- New Orleans Black Eagles
- New Orleans Black Pelicans (1907–08, 1938) – Independent Negro league, (1920, 1926, 1945) – Negro Southern League, (1931) – Texas–Louisiana League (Negro league) (1951, 1954) – Negro American League
- New Orleans Black Rappers (f. 1907) – Independent Negro leagues
- New Orleans Blue Rappers (f. 1907) – Independent Negro leagues
- New Orleans Cohens – Negro league baseball
- New Orleans Creoles (1947–48, 1950–51) – Negro Southern League, (1949) – Negro Texas League,
- New Orleans Crescents – Negro league baseball
- New Orleans Crescents/Unions (f. 1886) – Southern League of Colored Base Ballists
- New Orleans Crescent Stars (1921, 1932–33, 1935–37) – Independent Negro leagues (1922, 1934) – Negro Southern League (1923) – Texas Colored League
- New Orleans Dumonts – Negro league baseball
- New Orleans Eagles (1915–16) – Negro league baseball
- New Orleans Eclipse (f. 1907) – Independent Negro leagues
- New Orleans Expos (f. 1886) – Independent
- New Orleans Little Pels (1912) – Cotton States League
- New Orleans Pelicans (1887, 1889, 1898–1899) – Southern League (1888) – Texas-Southern League (1890, 1892–1896, 1901–1959) – Southern Association (1977) – American Association
- New Orleans Pinchbacks – Negro league baseball
- New Orleans Stars (1924) – Independent Negro leagues
- New Orleans Zephyrs/Baby Cakes (1993–1997) – American Association (1998–2019) – Pacific Coast League
- Oakdale Lumberjacks (1920) – Louisiana State League
- Opelousas Indians (1907) – Gulf Coast League (1934–41) – Evangeline League
- Opelousas Orphans (1932) – Cotton States League
- Ouachita Base Ball Club (Monroe) (1873)
- Pelican Base Ball Club (New Orleans) (1865–1867), (1868–1874) – Louisiana Base Ball Association (1875–1879), (1880–1884) – Crescent City League
- Plaquemine Tigers – Negro league baseball
- Rapides Base Ball Club (Alexandria) (1871)
- Rayne Red Sox (1934) – Evangeline League
- Rayne Rice Birds (1920) – Louisiana State League (1935–1941) – Evangeline League
- Reveille/Jackson Base Ball Club (Greenville) (1867)
- Robert E. Lee Base Ball Club (New Orleans) (f. 1864, 1869, 1886) – Gulf League
- St. Francisville Base Ball Club (St. Francisville) (1878)
- St. Louis–New Orleans Stars (1940–1941) – Negro American League
- Scotlandville White Sox – Negro league baseball
- Secret 9 Base Ball Team – Negro league baseball
- Shreveport Acme Giants (1923) – Texas Colored League
- Shreveport Black Sports (1926) – Texas Colored League (1927–28), (1929–30) – Texas–Oklahoma–Louisiana League, (1931) – Texas–Louisiana League (Negro league) (1946) – East Texas Negro League
- Shreveport Braves (1968–1970) – Texas League
- Shreveport Captains (1971) – Dixie Association (1972–2000) – Texas League
- Shreveport Gassers (1915–1924) – Texas League
- Shreveport Giants (1901–1903) – Southern Association
- Shreveport Grays (1895) – Texas-Southern League
- Shreveport Pirates (1904–1910) – Southern Association (1908–1910) – Texas League
- Shreveport Sports (1925–32, 1938–42, 1946–57) – Texas League (1933) – Dixie League (1934) – East Dixie League (1935) – West Dixie League (1959–1961) – Southern Association, (2003–2005) – Central League, (2006–2008) – American Association
- Shreveport Swamp Dragons (2001–2002) – Texas League
- Shreveport Tigers (1899) – Southern League, (1949) – Negro Texas League
- Shreveport Travelers (1951) – Arkansas–Louisiana–Texas League
- Shreveport-Bossier Captains (2009–2011) – American Association
- Shrewsbury Globetrotters – Negro league baseball
- Slidell Creoles – Negro league baseball
- South Louisiana Pipeliners (Morgan City) (2009) – Continental League
- Southern Base Ball Club (New Orleans) 1869
- Stonewall Base Ball Club (Algiers) (1867)
- Stonewall Base Ball Club (Pilette) (1893)
- Thibodaux Giants (1946–1953) – Evangeline League
- Thibodaux Pilots (1954) – Evangeline League
- Thibodaux Senators (1956–57) – Evangeline League
- Waterloo Base Ball Club (Pointe Coupee) (1878)
- West Baton Rouge Cubs – Negro league baseball
- Winnfield Devils – Negro league baseball

=== Defunct basketball teams ===
- Lake Charles Corsairs (2012–2013) – ABA (Did Not Play)
- Lake Charles Hurricanes – ABA (Did Not Play)
- Louisiana Cajun All Stars/New Orleans Cajun All Stars (2015–2016 DNP, 2017–2018) – ABA, (2016–2017) – NABL
- Louisiana Cajun Pelicans (Baton Rouge) (2004–2005) – ABA
- Louisiana Gators (Lake Charles) (2012–2013) – ABA
- Louisiana Soul (Lafayette) (2013) – PBL, (2014) – IBA/ABA, (2014–2015) – UBA
- Louisiana United (Lafayette) (2010–2011) – ABA
- Miss-Lou Warriors (Ferriday) (2016–2018) - NABL
- Monroe Magicians (2013–2014) – ABA
- New Orleans Blues/Louisiana Blues (2006–2007) – ABA (Did Not Play)
- New Orleans Buccaneers (1967–1970) – American Basketball Association
- New Orleans Cougars (2013–2014) – ABA
- New Orleans Hurricanes (1947–1948) – Professional Basketball League of America
- New Orleans Jazz (1974–1979) – NBA
- New Orleans Pride (1979–1981) – Women's Professional Basketball League
- New Orleans Sports (1948–1949) – Southern Basketball League
- Shreveport Crawdads (1994) – Continental Basketball Association
- Shreveport Stallions – ABA
- Shreveport Storm (1995) – Continental Basketball Association
- Shreveport-Bossier Flight (2016) – NABL/ABA
- Shreveport-Bossier Mavericks (2013–2015) – ABA

=== Defunct hockey teams ===
- Alexandria Warthogs (1998–2000) – WPHL
- Baton Rouge Kingfish (1996–2003) – ECHL
- Bossier-Shreveport Mudbugs (1997–2001) – WPHL, (2001–2011) CHL
- Cajun Catahoulas (2005–2006) – WSHL
- Lake Charles Ice Pirates (1997–2001) – WPHL
- Louisiana IceGators (1995–2005) – ECHL
- Louisiana IceGators (2009–2016) – SPHL
- Monroe Moccasins (1997–2001) – WPHL
- New Orleans Brass (1997–2002) – ECHL

=== Defunct soccer teams ===
- Baton Rouge Bombers (1997–1998) – EISL
- Baton Rouge Capitals (2007–2011) – PDL
- FC New Orleans (2012) – NPSL
- Lafayette SwampCats (1997–1998) – EISL
- Lafayette Swamp Cats (2000–2004) – PDL
- Lake City Gamblers (2014–2017) – GCPL
- Louisiana Fire (2016–2017) – GCPL
- New Orleans Riverboat Gamblers (1993–1998) / New Orleans Storm (1999) – PDL
- Nicholls State University Club (2014–2015) – GCPL
- Shreveport Lady Rafters (2017) – WPSL
- Shreveport Rafters FC (2016–2018) – NPSL
- Shreveport Rafters FC B (2016–2017) – GCPL
- Shreveport/Bossier Lions (1998) – USISL D-3 Pro League

== See also ==
- Sports in New Orleans
- Sports in Shreveport-Bossier
