= Harry Strohm =

Harry Strohm (October 28, 1901 – December 23, 1975) played and managed in minor league baseball from the 1920s to the 1950s. He ranks second all-time in career minor league hits with 3,486, behind only Spencer Harris. He ranks first in hits among all minor leaguers with no major league playing experience.

Strohm was born in Kansas City, Missouri.

== Teams played for ==
He began his professional career in 1922 for the Topeka Kaws of the Southwestern League, with whom he played until 1923. Partway through the 1923 campaign, he joined the Milwaukee Brewers of the American Association, with whom he played until 1924 and from 1926 to 1929. He was with the Southern Association's Nashville Volunteers in 1925. He rejoined the Southern Association in 1930, playing for the Little Rock Travelers until 1933. He also played for the Fort Worth Cats of the Texas League in 1933. In 1934, he joined the Birmingham Barons of the Southern Association and in 1935, he was with the Clarksdale Ginners of the East Dixie League. In 1936, he played for the Jackson Generals (Kentucky–Illinois–Tennessee League), Clarksdale Ginners (now of the Cotton States League) and Helena Seaporters (Cotton States League). He played for the Opelousas Indians of the Evangeline League in 1937 and 1938 and remained in the league for most of the rest of his career, playing for the Jeanerette Blues (1939), Lafayette White Sox (1940), Port Arthur Tarpons (1941–1942), Abbeville Athletics (1946), New Iberia Cardinals (1947), Alexandria Aces (1947) and Lafayette Bulls (1948–1949). He also played for the Southeastern League's Jackson Senators in 1942. He did not play from 1943 to 1945 due to World War II.

== Notable seasons ==
In just his second season, Strohm had his first 200 hit campaign, hitting .328 with 214 hits, 41 doubles, 18 triples (a career-high) and 11 home runs—the only year of his career in which he had double digit home runs. In 1925, he hit .356 with 214 hits, 41 doubles and 12 triples; in 1926, he had 10 triples and a .301 mark; in 1927, he had 214 hits, 46 doubles, 12 triples and a .312 batting average and in 1928, he had 202 hits, 40 doubles, 12 triples and a .323 mark. In 1930, he batted .336 with a career-high 53 doubles and in 1931—in only 81 games—he batted .318. He hit .324 with 12 triples in 1932. After a brief lull, he hit .302 in 1935 and had 11 triples in 1936. The .300 mark evaded him for a few years, though in 1940, he hit a career-high .361 with 44 doubles at 38 years old. He hit .319 the next year. Postwar, the 44-year-old hit .331 in 1946, .342 in 1947 and—at 46 years old -- .347 in 1948.

=== Career totals ===
In addition to his 3,486 hits, Strohm had 658 doubles and 164 triples. He batted .308 (or .309) for his career.

== Managerial career ==
For much of his career, Strohm was a player-manager. He managed the Little Rock Travelers from 1931 to 1933, but was replaced by Guy Sturdy partway through his final campaign. In 1935, he replaced Slim Brewer partway through the year to become the Clarksdale Ginners skipper, remaining in that role through 1936. He managed the Opelousas Indians from 1937 to 1938, leading them to a league championship the former year. Heading the Jeanerette Blues in 1939, his club made the playoffs but lost in the first round. The same fate befell him in 1940 with the Lafayette White Sox and 1941 with the Port Arthur Tarpons. Back with Port Arthur in 1942, he was replaced by Carl Kott on May 23. With the Abbeville Athletics in 1946, he reached the league finals, but lost. He skippered the New Iberia Cardinals in 1947, but was replaced by Vernon Thoele partway through the campaign. he then joined the Alexandria Aces, replacing Art Phelan on August 9. He was the Lafayette Bulls manager from 1948 to 1950, making the playoffs the last two seasons and losing in the first round both times. He led the Des Moines Bruins of the Western League in 1952. He returned to Alexandria to wrap up his managing career, heading them in 1953 and 1954. He won at least 1,100 games in his career.

== Later career ==
Strohm scouted for the Cincinnati Reds, Kansas City Athletics, Washington Senators and Texas Rangers.

He died in Lafayette, Louisiana at 74 years old.
