= Monroe Sports =

- 1950–1956; Monroe, Louisiana

Minor league affiliations
- Class: Class C (1950–1956)
- League: Cotton States League (1950–1955); Evangeline League (1956)

Major league affiliations
- Team: New York Yankees (1955–1956)

Minor league titles
- League titles (1): 1955
- Conference titles (2): 1951; 1955
- Wild card berths (3): 1950; 1952; 1954

Team data
- Name: Monroe Sports (1950–1956)
- Ballpark: Casino Park / American Legion Memorial Stadium (1950–1956)

The Monroe Sports were a minor league baseball team based in Monroe, Louisiana. From 1950 to 1955, the "Sports" played as members of the Class C level Cotton States League, winning the 1955 league championship. The Sports became a minor league affiliate of the New York Yankees in 1955 and continued the affiliation in 1956, when Monroe joined the Class C level Evangeline League for one season after the Cotton States League folded.

The Sports hosted home minor league games at Casino Park in Monroe.

== History ==
=== Early Monroe teams ===
Monroe, Louisiana first hosted minor league baseball in 1903, when the Monroe "Hill Citys" began play as members of the six-team Class D level Cotton States League.

The Sports were immediately preceded in minor league play by the Monroe White Sox, who played their final season in the Cotton States league in 1941. In their tenure of play, the Monroe White Sox hosted home games at Casino Park, which was constructed in 1931.

=== 1950 to 1954: Cotton States League ===
Monroe, Louisiana resumed minor league play in 1950, when the Monroe "Sports" franchise was formed and became members of the eight–team Class C level Cotton States League. The Helena Seaporters franchise relocated to Monroe following the 1949 season. The Clarksdale Planters, El Dorado Oilers, Greenville Bucks, Greenwood Dodgers, Hot Springs Bathers, Natchez Indians and Pine Bluff Judges joined Monroe in beginning league play on April 15, 1950.

In their first season of play, the Monroe Sports finished second in the Cotton States League standings. The Sports ended the 1950 season with a record of 81–56, finishing 2.5 games behind the first place Pine Bluff Judges, as Al Mazur served as manager. In the 1st round of the playoffs, the Hot Springs Bathers defeated Monroe Sports 4 games to 2. Cliff Coggin of Monroe led the league with 21 wins and teammate Ronald Lurk had a 1.55 ERA, best in the league.

Monroe won the 1951 Cotton States League pennant. The Sports ended the 1951 season with a record of 89–51, placing first and finishing 6.0 games ahead of the second place Greenwood Dodgers, as Al Mazur returned as manager. In the playoffs, the Natchez Indians defeated Monroe 4 games to 3. Monroe pitcher Billy Muffett led the Cotton States League with 22 wins and a 2.25 ERA.

The 1952 Monroe Sports qualified for the Cotton States League Playoffs. Monroe ended the 1952 regular season in fourth place with a record of 66–60. Fred Harrington served as manager, as the Sports ended the season 12.0 games behind the first place Meridian Millers, who then defeated Monroe 4 games to 2 in their 1st round playoff series. Monroe player John Jones led the league with both 91 RBI and 102 total hits.

The Monroe Sports finished last in the 1953 Cotton States League standings. The Sports ended the 1953 season with a record of 50–76, placing eighth under returning manager Fred Harrington. Monroe finished 29.5 games behind the first place Meridian Millers. Through 1953, the Cotton States League and its member teams were not integrated, as written in the league by-laws. In 1953, the Cotton States League attempted to evict the Hot Springs Bathers for attempting to add two former Negro leagues players, Jim Tugerson and his brother Leander Tugerson to their roster. The league owners voted, 6–0, with Pine Bluff abstaining, to expel the Bathers. On April 15, 1953, the National Association of Professional Baseball Leagues, ruled against the Cotton States League action and reinstated the Bathers franchise. By choice Jim and Leander Tugerson instead played for the Knoxville Smokies of the Mountain States League to begin the season. The Cotton States League became integrated in 1954, when Uvoyd Reynolds played for Hot Springs.

In 1954, the Monroe Sports ended the Cotton States League regular season in fourth place and qualified for the playoffs. With a record of 53–67, the Sports finished 4th as the league reduced to six teams. Ed Head served as manager, as Monroe finished 27.5 games behind the first place Greenville Tigers. In the playoffs, Greenville defeated the Monroe Sports4 games to 1. Monroe pitcher William Halley led the league with 176 strikeouts.

=== 1955: Cotton States League championship ===
The 1955 season was the final year of the Cotton States League, and the Monroe Sports won both the league pennant and league championship, as the team became a minor league affiliate of the New York Yankees. The Monroe Sports ended Cotton States League regular season with a record of 76–41, finishing first in the standings. Playing under returning manager Ed Hear, the Sports finished 7.5 games ahead of the second place El Dorado Oilers in the six–team league. In the first-round playoff series, Monroe swept the Hot Springs Bathers in 4 games. In the Cotton States League Finals, Monroe won the championship by defeating the El Dorado Oilers 4 games to 3 as the seven game series came down to the final game. In their championship season, Marshall Gilbert of Monroe led the league with both 19 home runs and 101 RBI.

Monroe was unable to defend their Cotton States League championship, as the league permanently folded and did not return to play in 1956. The Cotton States League was formed in 1902.

=== 1956: Evangeline League ===
In 1956, after the folding of the Cotton States league, the Monroe Sports played their final season, with the team becoming members of the eight–team, Class C level Evangeline League and remaining as a New York Yankees affiliate. The Sports joined the Alexandria Aces, Baton Rouge Rebels, Crowley Millers, Lafayette Oilers, Lake Charles Giants, New Iberia Cardinals and Thibodaux Senators in beginning league play on April 19, 1956.

The Monroe Sports ended the 1956 Evangeline League season with a record of 54–68, placing seventh and did not qualify for the playoffs. With Ed Head returning as manager, the Sports finished last after New Iberia folded on May 19, 1956. The Sports finished 27.5 games behind the first place Lafayette Oilers in the regular season standings. The Sports had home total attendance of 25,000 after drawing 57,000 the season before.

The Evangeline League resisted becoming an integrated league. In 1956, the Chicago Cubs assigned two black players, to their affiliate, the Lafayette Oilers, but the team refused to accept them to their roster. Boycotts ensued throughout the league and subsequently, Lafayette Parrish, home of the Baton Rouge Rebels, passed legislation making it illegal for black players to play in its ballparks. The Evangeline League itself also officially banned non–white players from appearing on the rosters of any league teams. These blocks forced the major league teams to reassign the players to other leagues. Due to boycotts, the 1956 playoff finals, featuring Lafayette were cancelled as a result.

In 1957, the Monroe franchise did not return to the Evangeline League, which reduced to six teams and permanently folded following the season. Monroe, Louisiana has not hosted another minor league team.

== The ballparks ==
The Monroe Sports hosted minor league home games at Casino Park. The ballpark was opened in 1931 and had field dimensions of (left–center–right) 360–450–330 in 1950. Casino Park was located at De Siard Street & South 29th Street, at the Missouri Pacific RR tracks. The ballpark also hosted the Negro leagues Monroe Monarchs, of the 1931 Texas–Louisiana Negro League and 1932 Negro Southern League. Today, there is a marker for the Monroe Monarchs near the former ballpark site.

The Sports were also noted to have played some home games at the renamed American Legion Memorial Stadium, which was constructed in 1950.

== Timeline ==
Year(s)	# Yrs.	Team	Level	League	Affiliate	Ballpark
1950–1954	5	Monroe Sports	Class C	Cotton States League	None	Casino Park
1955	1	Monroe Sports	Class C	Cotton States League	New York Yankees	Casino Park
1956	1	Monroe Sports	Class C	Evangeline League	New York Yankees	Casino Park

== Year–by–year records ==
Year	Record	Finish	Manager	Attend	Playoffs
1950	81–56	2nd	Al Mazur	80,814	Lost in 1st round
1951	89–51	1st	Al Mazur	70,262	League pennant Lost in 1st round
1952	66–60	4th	Fred Harrington	59,428	Lost in 1st round
1953	50–76	8th	Fred Harrington	40,918	Did not qualify
1954	53–67	4th	Ed Head	30,961	Lost in 1st round
1955	76–41	1st	Ed Head	57,704	League pennant League champions
1956	54–68	7th	Ed Head	25,831	Did not qualify

== Notable alumni ==
- Jim Bronstad (1955)
- Rod Kanehl (1955–1956)
- Billy Muffett (1950–1951)
- Bill Short (1956)
- Bill Tremel (1950)
- Jim Willis (1950)

== See also ==
- Monroe Sports players
