= Orange Hoo–Hoos =

- 1907–1908; Orange, Texas

Minor league affiliations
- Class: Class D (1907–1908)
- League: Gulf Coast League (1907–1908)

Major league affiliations
- Team: None

Minor league titles
- League titles (0): None

Team data
- Name: Orange Hoo–Hoos (1907–1908)
- Ballpark: Orange City Park (1907–1908)

The Orange Hoo–Hoos were a minor league baseball team based in Orange, Texas. In 1907 and 1908, the Hoo–Hoos played as members of the Class D level Gulf Coast League, before the league folded during the 1908 season. Orange hosted minor league home games at Orange City Park.

== History ==
Minor League baseball began in Orange in 1907, when the "Hoo–Hoos" became charter members of the six–team, Class D level Gulf Coast League. The Alexandria White Sox, Lafayette Browns, Lake Charles Creoles, Monroe Municipals and Opelousas Indians, joined Orange in beginning play on April 24, 1907.

The "Hoo–Hoos" nickname corresponds to the local lumber industry, as Orange was home to seventeen saw mills at its height of lumber production. The Concatenated Order of Hoo-Hoo is a fraternal organization, established in 1892. The organization is the oldest industrial fraternal organization in the United States and consists of lumbermen and those in trades that are related to the lumber industry.

In their first season of play, the Orange Hoo–Hoos placed fourth in the Gulf Coast League standings. With a record of 50–65, playing under manager Roland Vitter, the Hoo–Hoos finished 14.5 games behind the first place Lake Charles Creoles in the final Gulf Coast League standings, as no playoffs were held. Orange Hoo–Hoos pitcher Dick Richardson led the league with a 9–1 record.

In 1908, Orange played their final season, as the six–team Gulf Coast League folded during the season. The Hoo–Hoos joined the returning Alexandria White Sox and Lake Charles Creoles, along with the new Beaumont Cubs, Crowley Rice Birds and Morgan City Oyster Shuckers teams in beginning league play on April 30, 1908.

On June 3, 1908, the Gulf Coast League folded, as both the Beaumont and Crowley franchises disbanded. At the time the league folded, Orange was in second place with a record of 15–16. Managed by W.C. Rucker, the Hoo–Hoos finished 5.0 games behind the first place Lake Charles Creoles in the final standings.

The Gulf Coast League did not return to play in 1909. Orange, Texas has not hosted another minor league team.

== The ballpark ==
The Orange Hoo–Hoos teams played home minor league games at City Park. Today, the ballpark site is still in use as a public park, known as Orange Lions City Park.

In 1920 and 1921, the St. Louis Cardinals held their spring training in Orange, Texas at the newly constructed West End Park, next to Orange High School. Local lumber baron William Henry Stark aided in the construction of the ballpark and forming an organization to attract a team to Orange. Baseball Hall of Fame member Branch Rickey was the Cardinals' General Manager and chose Orange, Texas to host the Cardinals.

== Timeline ==
Year(s)	# Yrs.	Team	Level	League
1907–1908	2	Orange Hoo–Hoos	Class D	Gulf Coast League

== Year–by–year records ==
Year(s)	Record	Place	Managers	Playoffs/Notes
1907	50–65	4th	Roland Vitter	No playoffs held
1908	15–16	2nd	W.C. Rucker	League folded June 3

== Notable alumni ==
No players on the Orange Hoo–Hoos rosters advanced to the major leagues.
