= Sports in Shreveport-Bossier =

Shreveport–Bossier is and has been home to a wide variety of sporting events.

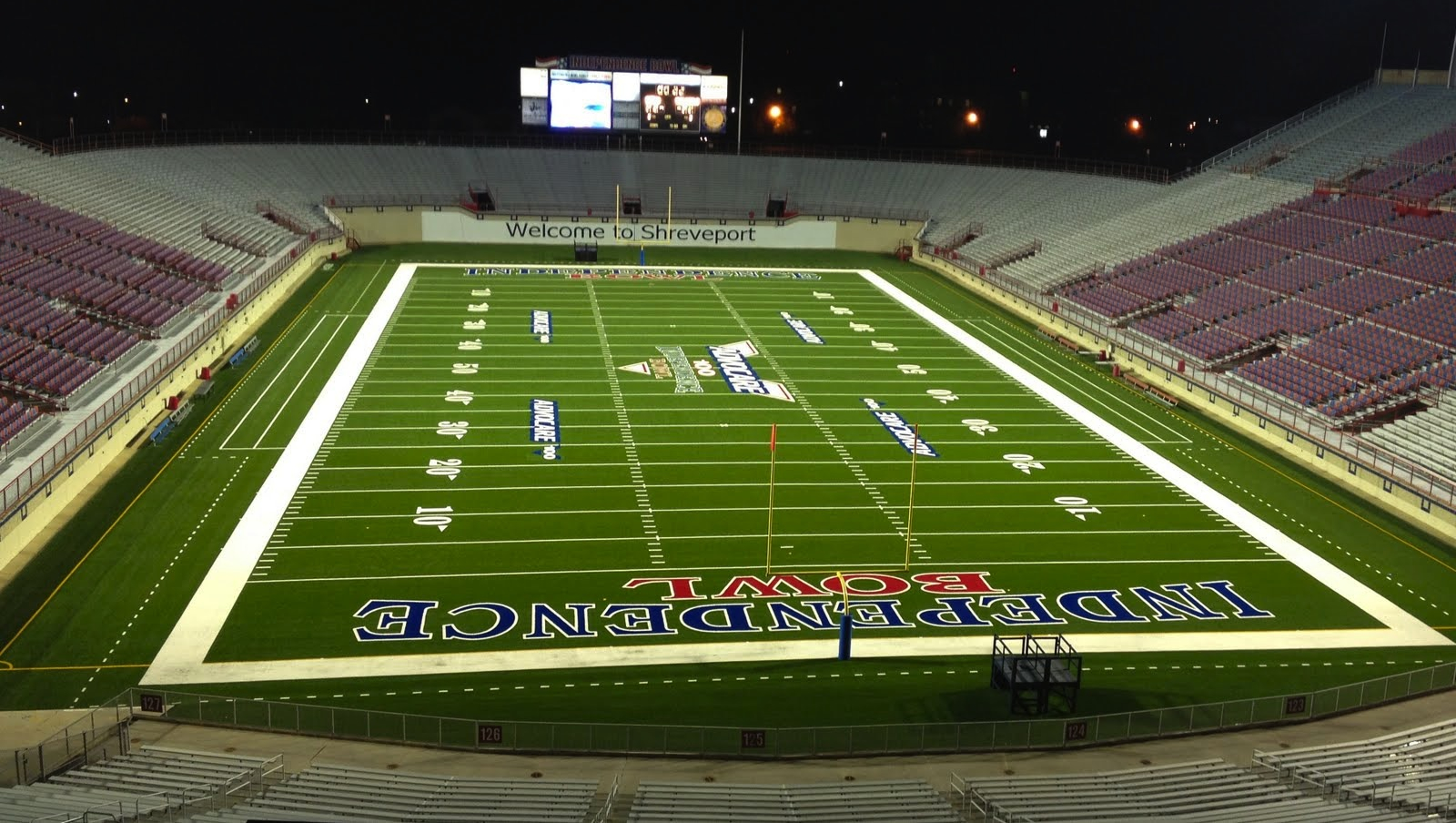
Independence Stadium

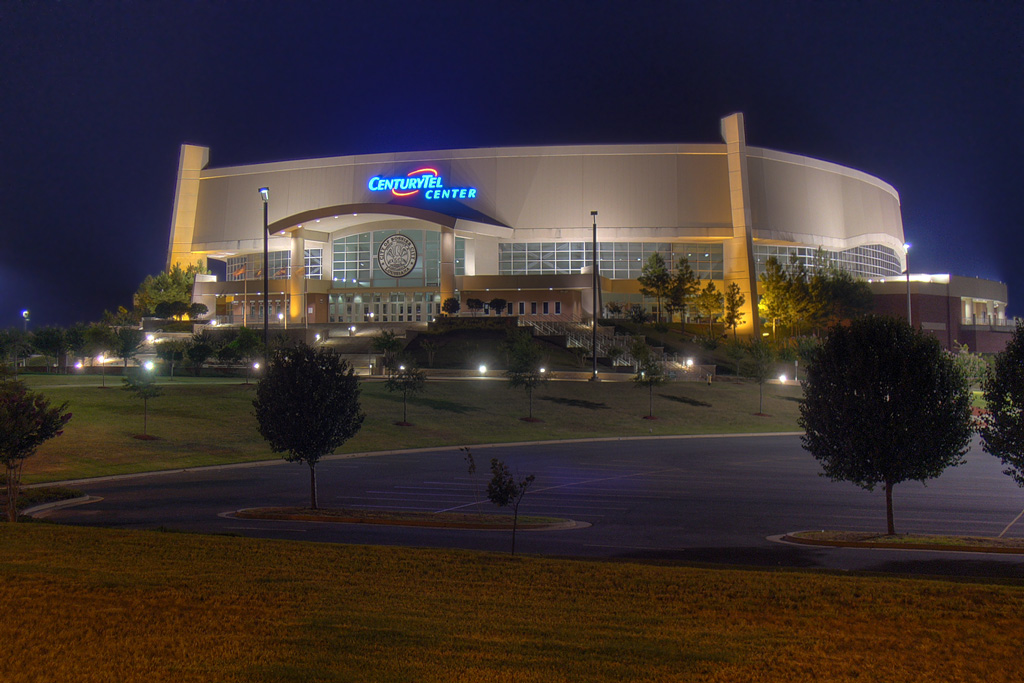
CenturyLink Center

- Louisiana Rouxgaroux (2025-present) National Arena League
- Bossier-Shreveport Battle Wings – (2001–2009) – AF2, (2010) – AFL
- Shreveport Aftershock – (2007–2009) – IWFL
- Shreveport-Bossier Bombers (2000) – IPFL
- Shreveport Knights (1999) – RFL
- Shreveport Pirates (1994–95) – CFL
- Shreveport Shockhers (2006) – NWFA
- Shreveport Steamer (1974–1975) – WFL
- Shreveport Steamers (1979–1981) – AFA

== Baseball ==
- Arlington/Blue Stockings Base Ball Club (Shreveport) (1872)
- Shreveport Acme Giants (1923) – Texas Colored League
- Shreveport Black Sports (1926) – Texas Colored League (1927–28), (1929–30) – Texas–Oklahoma–Louisiana League, (1931) – Texas–Louisiana League (Negro league) (1946) – East Texas Negro League
- Shreveport Braves (1968–1970) – Texas League
- Shreveport Captains (1971) – Dixie Association (1972–2000) – Texas League
- Shreveport Gassers (1915–1924) – Texas League
- Shreveport Giants (1901–1903) – Southern Association
- Shreveport Grays (1895) – Texas-Southern League
- Shreveport Pirates (1904–1910) – Southern Association (1908–1910) – Texas League
- Shreveport Sports (1925–32, 1938–42, 1946–57) – Texas League (1933) – Dixie League (1934) – East Dixie League (1935) – West Dixie League (1959–1961) – Southern Association, (2003–2005) – Central League, (2006–2008) – American Association
- Shreveport Swamp Dragons (2001–2002) – Texas League
- Shreveport Tigers (1899) – Southern League, (1949) – Negro Texas League
- Shreveport Travelers (1951) – Arkansas–Louisiana–Texas League
- Shreveport-Bossier Captains (2009–2011) – American Association

== Basketball ==
- Shreveport Crawdads (1994) – Continental Basketball Association
- Shreveport Storm (1995) – Continental Basketball Association
- Shreveport-Bossier Mavericks (2013–2015) – American Basketball Association/
- Shreveport Mavericks (2021-present)- The Basketball League

== College ==
- Bossier Parish Community College Cavaliers – NJCAA, MISS-LOU Junior College Conference
- Centenary Gentlemen and Ladies – NCAA Division III, Southern Collegiate Athletic Conference
- LSU–Shreveport Pilots – NAIA, Red River Athletic Conference
- Southern University at Shreveport Jaguars – NJCAA, MISS-LOU Junior College Conference

== Events ==
- Independence Bowl (1976–present)
- Red River State Fair Classic (1911–2016)

== Ice hockey ==
- Bossier-Shreveport Mudbugs (1997–2001) – WPHL, (2002–2011) CHL
- Shreveport Mudbugs (2016–present) – North American Hockey League

== Museums ==
- The Museum of American Fencing

== Roller derby ==
- Twin City Knockers (2010–present)

== Rugby ==
- Shreveport Rugby Football Club (1977–present) (A.C. Steere Park) – Texas Rugby Union Division 3
- Shreveport Valentines - Women's affiliate of Shreveport RFC

== Soccer ==
- Shreveport/Bossier Lions (1998) – USISL D-3 Pro League
- Boca Knights FC (2015–2019) – Gulf Coast Premier League
- CABOSA Shreveport United S.C. (2018–present) – Gulf Coast Premier League
- Shreveport Rafters FC (2016–2018) – National Premier Soccer League
- Shreveport Rafters FC B (2016–2017) – Gulf Coast Premier League
- Shreveport Lady Rafters (2017) – Women's Premier Soccer League
- Red River FC (2021-present) – USL League Two

== See also ==
- List of sports teams in Louisiana
