= Houma Indians =

- 1940–1952; (1940, 1946–1952); Houma, Louisiana

Minor league affiliations
- Class: Class D (1940, 1946–1948); Class C (1949–1952)
- League: Evangeline League (1940, 1946–1952)

Major league affiliations
- Team: None

Minor league titles
- League titles (2): 1946; 1948
- Conference titles (1): 1946; 1949

Team data
- Name: Houma Buccaneers (1940); Houma Indians (1946–1952)
- Ballpark: American Legion Park (1940, 1946–1952)

The Houma Indians were a minor league baseball team based in Houma, Louisiana. From 1946 to 1952, the team played as exclusively as members of the Evangeline League, winning the 1946 and 1948 Evangeline League Championships and capturing the 1949 league pennant. The 1940 Houma "Buccaneers" played a partial season in the Evangeline League before relocating during the season.

Houma hosted home minor league games at the American Legion Park.

In 1946, four Houma players were implicated in a baseball gambling scandal, with two Houma players ultimately ruled permanently ineligible, including player/manager Paul Fugit.

== History ==
=== Evangeline League, 1940 ===
The 1940 Houma Buccaneers became the first minor league baseball team based in Houma, Louisiana. The team relocated during the season. The "Buccaneers" began play as members of the Class D level Evangeline League. On June 27, 1940, the Houma Buccaneers had compiled a 23–43 record when the franchise moved to Natchez, Mississippi, finishing the season as the Natchez Pilgrims. After compiling a 28–38 record while based in Natchez, the Houma/Natchez team ended the season with a 51–79 overall record, placing seventh in the Evangeline League final standings, playing under manager Carlos Moore in both locations.

=== 1946 Evangeline League: Gambling scandal ===
Minor league baseball returned to Houma in 1946. After stopping play due to World War II following the 1942 season, the Evangeline League reformed for the 1946 season. Originally a league franchise was awarded to Opelousas, Louisiana, but the potential franchise there was ultimately unable to meet financial needs, and the franchise folded. A month before the 1946 season, a group in Houma, led by Gibson Autin met financial needs by organizing a corporation, selling stock to the public, and securing the American Legion Field. Houma was granted a franchise and Tom Smith was appointed as the business manager. The 1946 team used the actual uniforms intended for Opelousas. The team moniker of "Indians", was in reference to the Houma tribe, for which the city of Houma is named.

The Indians rejoined the Class D level Evangeline League in 1946 and won the league championship. The Indians joined the Abbeville Athletics, Alexandria Aces, Baton Rouge Red Sticks, Hammond Berries, Natchez Giants, New Iberia Cardinals and Thibodaux Giants in the 1946 Evangeline League.

In their first season in their new league, Houma ended the 1946 regular season with a record of 92–39, finishing 6 games ahead of the 2nd place Natchez Giants. The player/managers were Joseph Benning and Paul Fugit. Houma defeated the Alexandria Aces 4 games to 1 in the first playoff series. In the Evangeline League Finals, the Indians defeated the Abbeville Athletics 4 games to 1 to capture the 1946 Evangeline League Championship. Mike Conroy hit .372 to win the Evangeline League batting title. Three other players had noteworthy seasons before being embroiled in controversy after the season. Player/manager Paul Legit hit .327, with 23 home runs and 130 RBI, Leonard Pecou led the league with 53 stolen bases and William "Bill" Thomas had a pitching record of 35–7.

After the 1946 championship season, allegations surfaced that Houma and Abbeville players had conspired with gamblers over the outcomes of three playoff games. At the October 23, 1946, league meeting, it was alleged that the Houma players conspired with gamblers for Houma to lose the fourth game of the first round of the recent playoffs, lose the first game of the second round, and win the fourth game of the second round. After the allegations, Judge W. G. Bramham, President of the National Association of Professional Baseball Leagues, summoned the unnamed accused players to attend a hearing on January 10–11, 1947. After interviews and further investigation, five players were put on the ineligible list, meaning they could not play in minor league baseball. Houma players William "Bill" Thomas, Leonard Pecou, Alvin Kaiser and player/manager Paul Fugit along with Don Vettorel of Abbeville were placed on the ineligible list by Branham for their actions. Later, Thomas and Pecou appealed and were ultimately restored to eligibility by George Trautman, Bramham's successor after two years. On August 22, 1949, both players were reinstated and allowed to immediately to return to the Houma roster. After his reinstatement, Thomas would continue his career to set the minor league career records for total games, victories, losses, hits and runs. Baseball reference shows his career record as 305–264 over 24 seasons and other sources have his minor league win total at 383.

=== Evangeline League: 1947 to 1952 ===
Continuing play in 1947, Houma placed fifth in the Evangeline league final standings. Houma ended the regular season with a 63–76 record in the 1947 regular season, finishing 19.5 games behind the first place Alexandria Aces. With their fifth-place finish, Houma did not qualify for the four-team Evangeline League playoffs, while playing the season under player/managers Copeland Goss and George Washburn. Hosting home games at American Legion Park, Houma had home season attendance of 100,934, an average of 1,452 per game.

The 1948 team the captured Evangeline League pennant and overall championship. Houma won the regular season pennant and after the entire playoffs were cancelled due to weather, Huma was the default champion. Houma ended the regular season in first place with an 81–55 record, playing under manager George Washburn. The Indians finished 2.5 games ahead of the second place Hammond Berries. In the first round of the four-team 1948 playoff series, the Houma series against the Baton Rouge Red Sticks was tied 1 game to 1 and the Hammond Berries and Thibodaux Giants were tied 2 games to 2, when the entire 1948 playoffs were cancelled due to bad weather. Houma season home attendance was 96,744, an average of 1,423.

Houma's Roy “Tex” Sanner had a noteworthy season as a hitter and a pitcher in 1948. Sanner won the Evangeline League's “triple crown,” hitting 34 home runs, 126 RBI, and a batting average of .386 to lead the league in all three categories. As a pitcher, Sanner compiled a 21–2 record, with a 2.58 ERA and 251 strikeouts.

Houma, under manager George Washburn, won their second consecutive pennant in 1949. After capturing the Evangeline League pennant with an 81–58 record, the Indians were defeated by the Alexandria Aces 4 games to 1 in the first round of the playoffs. Continuing play at American Legion Park, 1949 season attendance was 73,853, an average of 1,063.

Houma finished with a 53–84 in record 1950 and had the first of three consecutive seventh-place finishes. The Evangeline League was upgraded to a Class C level league as Houma finished 32.0 games behind the champion Lafayette Bulls, again playing under returning manager George Washburn. Total season attendance was 43,283, an average of 632.

Houma ended the 1951 season in the Evangeline League with a record of 60–78, again placing seventh in the regular season standings. Sid Gautreaux served as manager, as Houma finished 16 games behind the Thibodaux Giants. Attendance at American Legion Park declined to 32,716, an average of 474.

In their final season, the 1952 Houma Indians finished with a 59–79 record, placing seventh in the eight–team Evangeline League for the third consecutive season. Playing under Managers Woodrow Head and Bobby Gales, Houma was 21.5 games behind the Crowley Millers. Season attendance was 25,821, an average of 377. Both the Houma Indians and Abbeville Athletics franchises were folded after the 1952 season, leaving the Evangeline league with a 6–team field for 1953. The Evangeline League eventually folded following the 1957 season and had never become an integrated league, despite the efforts of major league affiliates to assign players to teams in the league.

Houma was without a minor league team until 2003. The Houma Hawks played as members of the independent Southeastern League in 2003.

Today, Houma Indians baseball artifacts are on display within the Ellender Memorial Library on the campus of Nicholls State University.

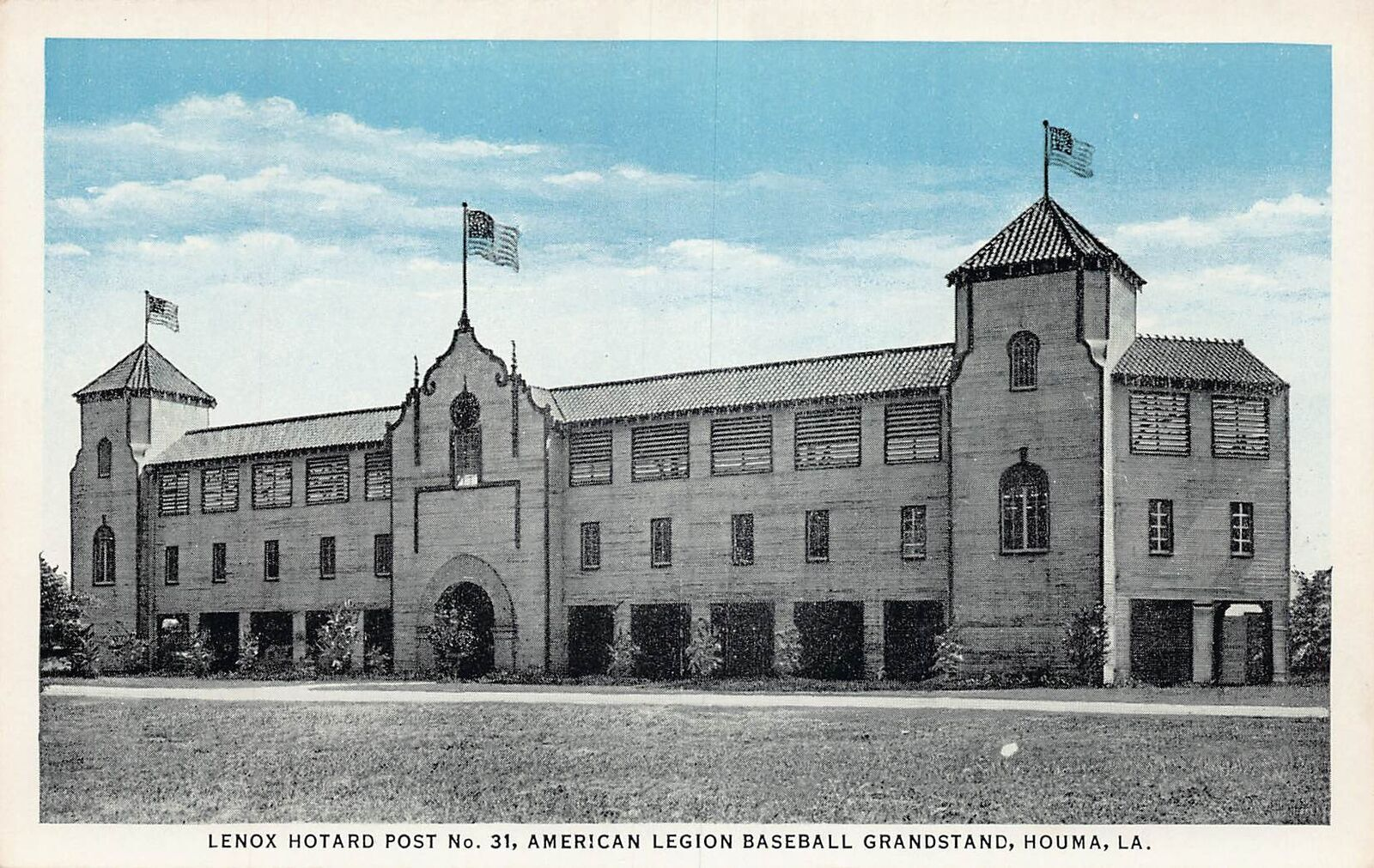
Postcard of American Legion Ballpark

== The ballpark ==
The Houma Buccaneers and Houma Indians reportedly played minor league home games at American Legion Park in 1940 and from 1946 to 1952. The ballpark had a capacity of 3,000 in 1940, 3,800 in 1950 and expanded to 4,500 in 1952. American Legion Park had a wooden grandstand and was destroyed by fire in 1956. American Legion Park was located at Lafayette & Crescent Boulevard in Houma, Louisiana.

== Timeline ==
| Year(s) | # Yrs. | Team | Level | League | Ballpark |
|---|---|---|---|---|---|
| 1940 | 1 | Houma Buccaneers | Class D | Evangeline League | American Legion Park |
| 1946–1948 | 3 | Houma Indians | Class D | Evangeline League | American Legion Park |
| 1949–1952 | 4 | Houma Indians | Class C | Evangeline League | American Legion Park |

== Year-by-year records ==
| Year | Record | Finish | Manager | Playoffs/Notes |
|---|---|---|---|---|
| 1940 | 51–79 | 7th | Carlos Moore | Houma (23–43) moved to Natchez June 27 |
| 1946 | 92–39 | 1st | Babe Benning / Paul Fugit | League champions |
| 1947 | 63–76 | 5th | Copeland Goss (6–14) / George Washburn (57–63) | Did not qualify |
| 1948 | 81–55 | 1st | George Washburn | League champions series cancelled tied 1–1 |
| 1949 | 81–58 | 1st | George Washburn | Won league pennant Lost in 1st round |
| 1950 | 53–84 | 7th | George Washburn | Did not qualify |
| 1951 | 60–78 | 7th | Sid Gautreaux | Did not qualify |
| 1952 | 58–79 | 7th | Woodie Head / Robert Gales | Did not qualify |

== Notable alumni ==
- Harry Bright (1947)
- Sid Gautreaux (1951, MGR)
- Carlos Moore (1940, MGR)
- Armando Roche (1948)
- Lefty Scott (1940)
- George Washburn (1947–1950, MGR)

== See also ==
- Houma Buccaneers players
- Houma Indians players
