= Hammond Berries =

- 1946–1951; Hammond, Louisiana

Minor league affiliations
- Class: Class D (1946–1948); Class C (1949–1951)
- League: Evangeline League (1946–1951)

Major league affiliations
- Team: None

Minor league titles
- League titles (3): 1947; 1949; 1951
- Wild card berths (5): 1946; 1947; 1947; 1949; 1951

Team data
- Name: Hammond Berries (1946–1951)
- Ballpark: Berry Stadium (1946–1951)

The Hammond Berries were a minor league baseball franchise based in Hammond, Louisiana. From 1946 to 1951, the Berries played exclusively as members of the Evangeline League and captured Evangeline League championships in 1947, 1949 and 1951. The Hammond Berries played home minor league games at Berry Stadium, located on the campus of Southeastern Louisiana University.

== History ==
Minor league baseball began in Hammond, Louisiana in 1946, when the Hammond Berries began play as members of the eight–team league Class D level Evangeline League in 1946, as the league was reforming. The Abbeville Athletics, Alexandria Aces, Baton Rouge Red Sticks, Houma Indians, Natchez Giants, New Iberia Cardinals and Thibodaux Giants teams joined Hammond in beginning league play on April 23, 1946.

The Hammond Berries finished their first season of play in last place. With a 44–87 record in 1946, Hammond finished last in the eight–team league, finishing 48 games behind the first-place Houma Indians. Hammond played the season under manager Joe Valenti.

The 1947 Hammond Berries won the Evangeline League championship. After placing fourth with a 73–60 regular season record, finishing 6.5 games behind the first place Alexandria Aces, the Berries qualified for the playoffs. In the first-round playoff, Hammond defeated Alexandria 4 games to 1 in the series to advance. In the Finals, the Hammond Berries swept the Thibodaux Giants in four games to win the championship. Hammond was managed to the championship by Babe Benning and Paul Bruno. Home season attendance in 1947 was 59,126.

In 1948, Hammond ended the season as the runner up in the Evangeline league regular season. The Berries finished with a 79–58 record, placing second in the Evangeline League regular season standings. Hammond ended the season 2.5 games behind the Houma Indians. Hammond played under returning manager Paul Bruno. The first round playoff series with the Thibodaux Giants was tied 2 games to 2 when the entire postseason was cancelled due to bad weather. Hammond had season home attendance of 62,346.

Playing for the Berries in 1948, Ray Sanner won the Evangeline League Triple Crown. Sanner, nicknamed "Tex," hit .386 with 34 home runs and 126 RBI on the season.

The 1949 Hammond Berries won their second Evangeline League Championship, as the league became a Class C level league. Hammond finished the regular season in 3rd place with a 73–63 record, finishing 5.0 games behind the 1st place Houma Indians and qualifying for the playoffs. In the first round of playoffs the Berries defeated the Lafayette Bulls 4 games to 1 to advance. In the Finals, Hammond beat the Alexandria Aces 4 games to 2 to capture the championship under manager Paul Bruno. Hammond drew 51,071 for the season at home.

After winning the Evangeline League pennant in 1949, Hammond lost four straight games to the Gladewater Bears, winners of the East Texas League pennant, in a best-of-seven interleague championship.

The 1950 Berries advanced to the Evangeline League playoff finals. In the regular season, the Berries ended in fourth place with a 71–65 record, finishing 13.5 games behind the first place Lafayette Bulls. The Berries qualified for the playoffs, playing the season under managers Joe Kracher and Joe Powers. In the playoffs, the Berries defeated the Lafayette Bulls 4 games to 1, before being swept by the Baton Rouge Red Sticks 4 games to 0 in the finals. In the regular season, Ray Dunn of Hammond hit 39 home runs to lead the league.

In their final season, the 1951 Hammond Berries captured their third Evangeline League championship, before folding after the season. Under returning manager Joe Powers, Hammond placed third with a 73–64 record in the regular season, finishing 2.5 games behind the first place Thibodaux Giants. In the first-round playoff series, the Berries defeated the New Iberia Pelicans 4 games to 3. In the finals, the Hammond Berries defeated the Baton Rouge Red Sticks 4 games to 2 to win the championship. The championship run was led by Berries pitcher Jack Cardey, who led the Evangeline League with both 25 wins and a 2.67 ERA.

Despite the success on the field in winning the Evangeline League championship, the Hammond franchise folded after the 1951 season, during which they drew a total of 28,230 fans. The Hammond franchise was replaced by the Abbeville Athletics in the 1952 Evangeline League season. Hammond has not hosted another minor league team.

== Berry Stadium ==
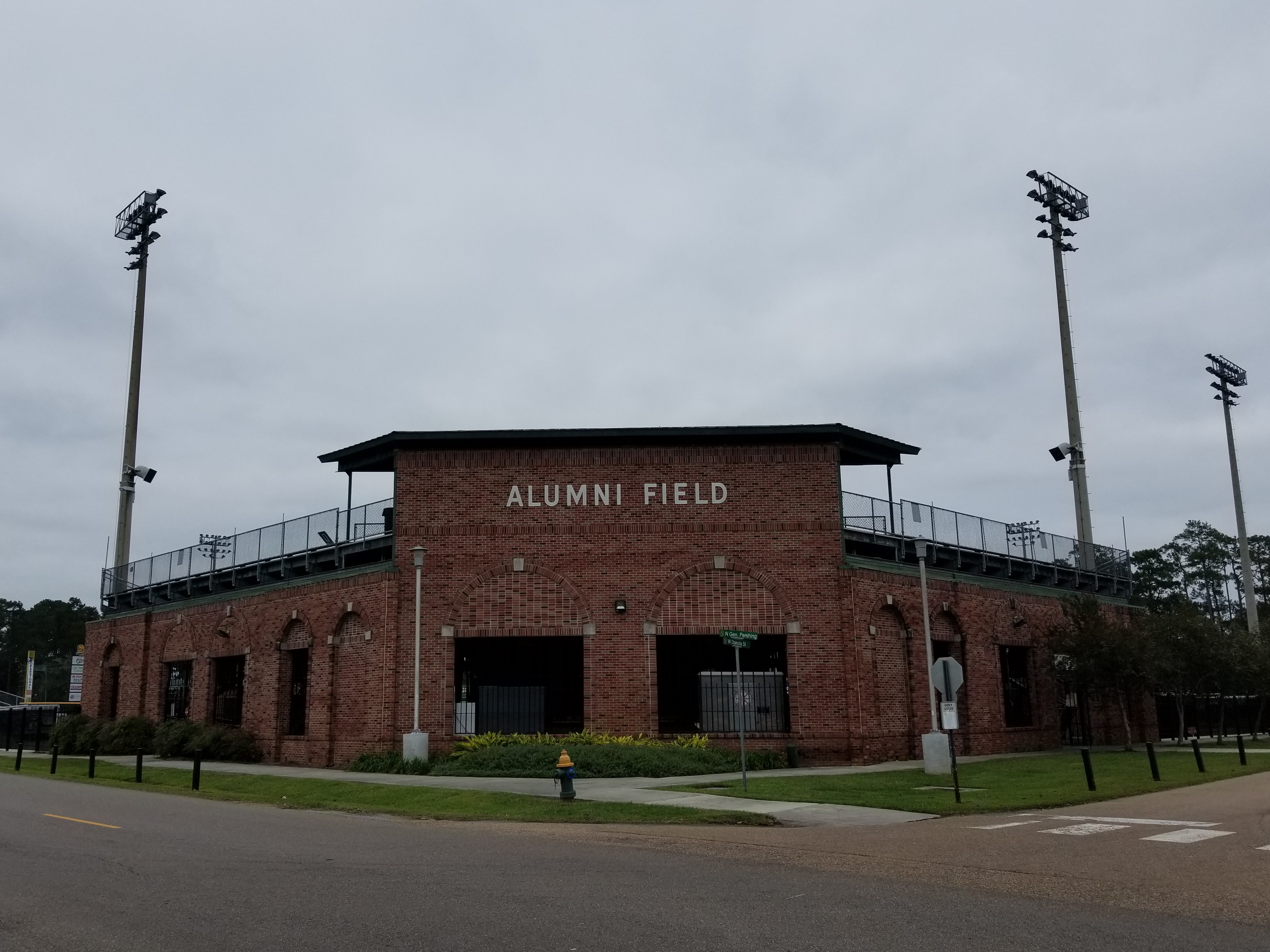
(2019) Pat Kenelly Diamond at Alumni Field Hammond, Louisiana

The Hammond Berries were noted to have played minor league home games at Berry Stadium in Southeastern Park, which was on the campus of Southeastern Louisiana College near Strawberry Stadium. The Berry Stadium site is now the location of SLU's Pat Kenelly Diamond at Alumni Field baseball grounds. Berry Stadium had a capacity of 1,800 in 1949 and expanded to 3,500 in 1950.

== Timeline ==
Year(s)	# Yrs.	Team	Level	League	Ballpark
1946–1948	3	Hammond Berries	Class D	Evangeline League	Berry Stadium
1949–1951	3	Hammond Berries	Class C	Evangeline League	Berry Stadium

== Year–by–year records ==
Year	Record	Finish	Manager	Playoffs/Notes
1946	44–87	8th	Joe Valenti	No playoffs held
1947	73–60	4th	Babe Benning / Paul Bruno	League champions
1948	79–58	2nd	Paul Bruno	Playoffs cancelled by weather series vs. Thibodaux Giants tied 2 to 2
1949	73–63	3rd	Paul Bruno	League champions
1950	71–65	4th	Joe Kracher / Joe Powers	Lost in Finals
1951	73–64	3rd	Joe Powers	League champions

== Notable alumni ==
- John Burrows (1948)
- Joe Kracher (1950, MGR)
- Irv Stein (1947)

== See also ==
- Hammond Berries players
