= Opelousas Indians =

- 1907–1941; (1907, 1932, 1934–1941); Opelousas, Louisiana

Minor league affiliations
- Class: Class D (1907, 1932, 1934–1941)
- League: Gulf Coast League (1907); Cotton States League (1932); Evangeline League (1934–1941)

Major league affiliations
- Team: Cleveland Indians (1935–1937, 1939)

Minor league titles
- League titles (1): 1937
- Wild card berths (4): 1934; 1935; 1936; 1937

Team data
- Name: Opelousas Indians (1907); Opelousas Orphans (1932); Opelousas Indians (1934–1941)
- Ballpark: Elementary School Park (1907, 1932, 1934–1941)

The Opelousas Indians was the primary name of the minor league baseball teams based in Opelousas, Louisiana. Between 1907 and 1941, Opelousas teams played as members of the Class D level 1907 Gulf Coast League, 1932 Cotton States League, playing that season known as the "Orphans" and Evangeline League from 1934 to 1941. The Indians won the 1937 league championship. Opelousas hosted minor league home games at Elementary School Park. The Opelousas Indians were a minor league affiliate of the Cleveland Indians from 1935 to 1937 and in 1939.

== History ==
Minor League baseball began in Opelousas in 1907 when the Opelousas Indians played one season in the early Gulf Coast League, finishing in last place. Beginning play on April 24, 1907, the Indians placed sixth with a record of 48–67. Playing under manager D. Edmonds, Opelousas finished 19.0 games behind the 1st place Lake Charles Creoles in the final Gulf Coast League standings.

In 1932, minor league baseball returned, then the Opelousas Orphans were briefly members of the Class D level Cotton States League. The Port Arthur Refiners moved to DeQuincy, Louisiana on June 19, 1932. Shortly after, the DeQuincy Railroaders moved to Opelousas on July 7, 1932. The Opelousas Orphans were 1–5 when the team disbanded on July 10, 1932, with an overall record of 17–45, playing in the three cities. The Cotton States League then disbanded on July 13, 1932.

In 1934, the Opelousas Indians became founding members of the newly formed Class D level Evangeline League. The Alexandria Aces, Lafayette White Sox, Lake Charles Lakers, New Iberia Cardinals and Rayne Red Sox joined Opelousas as fellow founding franchises in league play. On May 20, 1934, Indians pitcher Wallace Pate threw a no–hitter in a 1–0 7–inning victory over the Lafayette White Sox.

The Indians remained in the Evangeline League from 1934 to 1941, winning the 1937 Evangeline League Championship. In 1937, under manager Harry Strohm, the Indians finished with a regular season record of 73-65 to finish in third place in the regular season. in the 1937 playoffs, the Opelousas defeated the Rayne Rice Birds 4 games to 1. In the finals the Opelousas Indians won the championship by defeating the Lake Charles Skippers 4 games to 3. Overall, the Indians made the playoffs in each of their first four seasons of Evangeline League play. The Opelousas Indians were a minor league affiliate of the Cleveland Indians from 1935 to 1937 and 1939.

On May 22, 1935, Opelousas Indians pitcher Everett Albritton threw a no–hitter in a 3–0 victory over the Jeanerette Blues.

After the 1941 season, the Opelousas Indians permanently disbanded. The Rayne Rice Birds had disbanded near the end of the 1941 season. Subsequently, the 1942 Evangeline League dropped from eight teams to six teams, playing until the league disbanded on May 30, 1942.

Opelousas has not hosted another minor league team.

== The ballpark ==
The Orphans and Indians teams played home minor league games at Elementary School Park. The ballpark had a capacity of 3,500 after an expansion in 1939. It had dimensions of (Left, Center, Right): 360–450–360 (1936) and 362–400–362 (1939). The ballpark was located at 1218 East Leo Street, Opelousas, Louisiana.

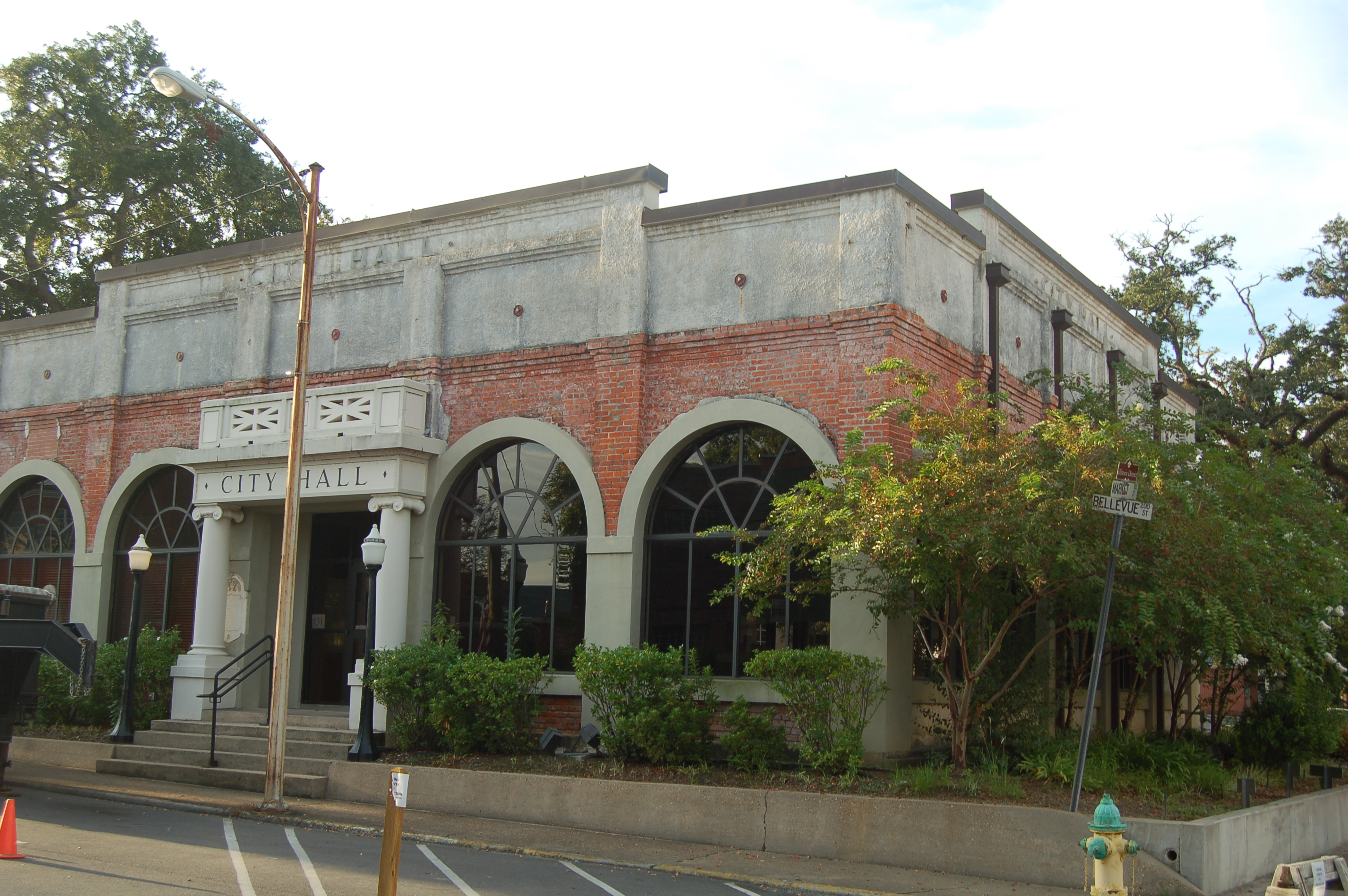
(2005) Opelousa, Louisiana. Old City Hall is on the National Register of Historic Places

== Timeline ==
| Year(s) | # Yrs. | Team | Level | League | Affiliate |
|---|---|---|---|---|---|
| 1907 | 1 | Opelousas Indians | Class D | Gulf Coast League | None |
| 1932 | 1 | Opelousas Orphans | Class D | Cotton States League | None |
| 1935–1937 | 1 | Opelousas Indians | Class D | Evangeline League | Cleveland Indians |
| 1938 | 1 | Opelousas Indians | Class D | Evangeline League | None |
| 1939 | 1 | Opelousas Indians | Class D | Evangeline League | Cleveland Indians |
| 1940–1941 | 1 | Opelousas Indians | Class D | Evangeline League | None |

== Year–by–year records ==
| Year(s) | Record | Place | Managers | Playoffs/Notes |
|---|---|---|---|---|
| 1907 | 48–67 | 6th | D. Edmonds | No playoffs held |
| 1932 | 1–5 | NA | Milt Delmas | DeQuincy (2–12) moved to Opelousas July 7 Team disbanded July 10 |
| 1934 | 62–50 | 2nd | Patsy Flaherty / Clay Guilbeau | Lost League Finals |
| 1935 | 69–60 | 4th | Jay Kirke / Milt Delmas/ Don McShane | Lost in 1st round |
| 1936 | 89–48 | 2nd | Carlos Moore | Lost League Finals |
| 1937 | 73–65 | 3rd | Harry Strohm | League Champs |
| 1938 | 64–67 | 6th | Harry Strohm | Did not qualify |
| 1939 | 51–84 | 8th | Joe Woodward | Did not qualify |
| 1940 | 59–75 | 6th | Conrad Flippen | Did not qualify |
| 1941 | 60–69 | 6th | Eldon Breese | Did not qualify |

== Notable alumni ==
- Patsy Flaherty (1934, MGR)
- Al Jurisich (1939)
- Jay Kirke (1935, MGR)
- Jack Kraus (1937)
- Carlos Moore (1936, MGR)
- Hub Northen (1907)
- Lefty Scott (1941)
- Roy Weatherly (1934)
- Jim Whatley (1937–1938)

== See also ==
- Opelousas Indians players
