= Leesville Angels =

Minor League Baseball team

- 1950; Leesville, Louisiana

Minor league affiliations
- Class: Class C (1950)
- League: Gulf Coast League (1950)

Major league affiliations
- Team: None

Minor league titles
- League titles (0): None
- Wild card berths (1): 1950

Team data
- Name: Leesville Angels (1950)
- Ballpark: Leesville City Park (1950)

The Leesville Angels were a minor league baseball franchise based in Leesville, Louisiana. In 1950, the Angels played a partial season as members of the Class C level Gulf Coast League after the Lufkin Angles franchise relocated to Leesville during the season. The Angels qualified for the Gulf Coast League playoffs.

The Leesville Angels hosted minor league home games at the Leesville City Park.

== History ==
Minor league baseball began in Leesville, Louisiana in 1950. The Lufkin Angels, based in Lufkin, Texas began play as members of the six–team Class C level Gulf Coast League. The Crowley Millers, Galveston White Caps, Jacksonville Jax, Lake Charles Lakers and Port Arthur Seahawks teams joined the Angels in beginning league play on April 2, 1950.

During the season, on July 15, 1950, the Lufkin Angels, with a record of 43–51 moved to Leesville. Citing poor attendance at Lufkin home games as the reason for moving, the Lufkin Angels had also explored moving the team to Orange, Texas, before ultimately deciding instead on the move to Leesville.

After the move to Leesville, the team compiled a record of 32–19 while based in Leesville. The Angels ended the Gulf Coast League regular season in fourth place, which qualified the Angels for the four-team playoffs. With a 75–70 overall record in 1950, playing under manager Carl Carter, the Angels finished 14.5 games behind the first place Crowley Millers in the final regular season standings. In the first round of the playoffs, Crowley defeated Leesville 4 games to 2, ending the Angels' season.

Angels pitcher Vallie Eaves had a 26–10 record in 1950, throwing 297 innings for Lufkin/Leesville at age 38.

The Leesville franchise did not return to the Gulf Coast League in 1951, as the league expanded to eight teams and was elevated to a Class B level league. Five new teams joined the returning Galveston, Lake Charles and Port Arthur franchises. Leesville, Louisiana has not hosted another minor league team.

== The ballpark ==
Leesville hosted minor league home games at the Leesville City Park. The ballpark was located on the Shreveport Highway in Leesville. Today, Leesville Municipal Park is still in use as a public park. It is located at 350 Country Club Road in Leesville.

== Year–by–year record ==
Year	Record	Finish	Manager	Playoffs/Notes
1950	75–70	4th	Carl Carter	Lufkin (43–51) moved to Leesville July 15; Lost in first round

== Notable alumni ==
- Vallie Eaves (1950)
