= Acadian Park =

Baseball park in New Iberia, Louisiana

Coordinates: 30°1′17″N 91°49′35″W

Acadian Park, also known as Acadian Ballpark, is a baseball stadium located in New Iberia, Louisiana, United States. It served as the home ballpark for the New Iberia Rebels, New Iberia Pelicans, New Iberia Cardinals and New Iberia Indians, each of whom played in the Evangeline League.

It is still currently in use, serving high school baseball teams.
