= Gulf Coast League Padres =

Minor league baseball team (1981–1982)

- (1981–1982); Bradenton, Florida

Minor league affiliations
- Class: Rookie
- League: Gulf Coast League

Major league affiliations
- Teams: San Diego Padres

Team data
- Ballpark: McKechnie Field

The Gulf Coast League (GCL) Padres were a Minor League Baseball team that played at McKechnie Field in Bradenton, Florida in 1981 and 1982. The club played in the Rookie-level Gulf Coast League as an affiliate of the San Diego Padres.

The Padres organization had not had a Rookie league affiliate prior to the GCL Padres and would not field one again until the Arizona League Padres formed in 1988. McKechnie Field and Bradenton hosted several other teams before, during, and after the Padres tenure, with the GCL Pirates being the longest-running affiliate. McKechnie Field was later renovated and now is the home field of the Bradenton Marauders, a Pirates affiliate. The Rookie-level team, now called the Florida Complex League Pirates, also play in Bradenton.

== Season-by-season ==
Year	Record	Finish	Manager	Playoffs
1981	25–38	11th	Jim Zerilla	
1982	29–34	7th	Manny Crespo	

== Notable players ==
- Ozzie Guillen (1981)
- Bob Patterson (1982)
