= Dennis Sommers =

American baseball player, coach, and manager (1940–2020)

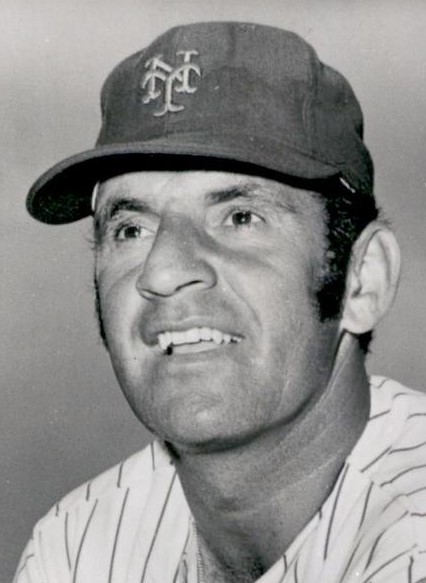
- Coach
- Born: July 12, 1940 (age 85); New London, Wisconsin, U.S.
- Died: September 14, 2020; Hortonville, Wisconsin, U.S.
- Batted: Left Threw: Right
- Stats at Baseball Reference

Teams
- New York Mets (1977–1978); Cleveland Indians (1980–1985); San Diego Padres (1988–1990); San Francisco Giants (1993–1994)

Dennis James Sommers (July 12, 1940 – September 14, 2020) was an American professional baseball catcher, manager and coach. A left-handed batter who threw right-handed, Sommers stood 6 feet 2 inches (1.88 m) tall and weighed 205 pounds (93 kg). He was born in New London, Wisconsin.

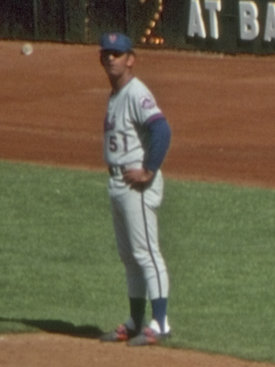
Sommers with the New York Mets in 1978

Sommers spent the first 18 years of his baseball career as a player and manager in the San Francisco Giants' farm system, peaking for two half seasons (1965–66) with the Tacoma Giants and Phoenix Giants of the Triple-A Pacific Coast League. Later in 1966, he began his managerial career as a midseason replacement for the Lexington Giants of the Class A Western Carolinas League. He handled San Francisco farm teams through 1975, ending as the team's Double-A skipper. His 1975 Lafayette Drillers were co-champions of the Texas League.

After spending the 1976 campaign as pilot of the Chicago Cubs' Midland Cubs TL affiliate, Sommers came to Major League Baseball for the first time as first-base coach of the New York Mets in 1977–78, working for Joe Frazier and Joe Torre. When his contract was not renewed for 1979, Sommers moved to the Detroit Tigers' system as manager of the Montgomery Rebels of the Double-A Southern League.

Then, in 1980, Sommers returned to MLB as a coach for the Cleveland Indians (1980–85). He later coached for the San Diego Padres (1988–90) and the Giants (1993–94). In between those assignments, he served as a minor league instructor, scout, and front-office official. All told, Sommers coached in Major League Baseball for 13 seasons.

As a minor league player, Sommers batted .220 in 2,570 at-bats spread over ten seasons, while as a manager, his teams compiled a 781–815 record (.489) with one championship.
