= Lafayette Drillers =

- 1975–1976; Lafayette, Louisiana

Minor league affiliations
- Class: Double-A (1975–1976)
- League: Texas League (1975–1976)

Major league affiliations
- Team: San Francisco Giants (1975–1976)

Minor league titles
- League titles (1): 1975 (co-champions)

Team data
- Ballpark: Clark Field

The Lafayette Drillers baseball club was an American minor league baseball franchise representing Lafayette, Louisiana, that played for two seasons, 1975–76, in the Double-A Texas League as an affiliate of the San Francisco Giants. The team played its home games at Clark Field.

The Drillers were created when the Amarillo Giants transferred to Lafayette after a 1974 campaign that saw them draw a total of less than 46,000 fans. Lafayette previously hosted minor league teams in the Evangeline League (Class D, 1934–42; Class C, 1948–57), Louisiana State League (Class D, 1920) and the early-20th century Gulf Coast League (Class D, 1907). Those teams sported nicknames such as the Browns, Hubs, White Sox, Bulls and Oilers.

== Texas League co-champions (1975) ==
The 1975 Drillers captured the Texas League's East Division title and attendance rose by 57 percent over the 1974 Amarillo team's showing, ranking fourth among the eighth teams in the circuit. The Drillers were declared league co-champions with the Midland Cubs when the playoffs were rained out after four games and the series was tied at two wins each. With the muddy field causing unplayable conditions, league president Bobby Bragan suggested that the Drillers and Cubs settle matters with a tug of war. Thirty years later, then-Driller radio announcer John Steigerwald recalled: "So, the fans who came to Clark Field in Lafayette to see future major leaguers decide a Double-A championship saw 50 young guys trying to pull each other into a pile of mud."

The Drillers' 1976 edition posted the league's worst record, and also plummeted to last in fan support. The Lafayette franchise then moved to Tulsa, Oklahoma, in 1977, returning the city to the Texas League fold after eleven years in Triple-A. The Tulsa Drillers have remained in the Texas League ever since. Meanwhile, the Giants moved their 1977 Double-A affiliate to the Eastern League. Lafayette returned to professional baseball with an independent league franchise, the Bayou Bullfrogs, in 1998.

== Notable alumni ==
- Gary Alexander
- Jack Clark

Year	Record	Finish Full Season	Attendance	Manager	Postseason
1975	72–57	First (East Division)	72,549	Dennis Sommers	League co-champions
1976	58–76	Fourth (East Division)	35,808	John VanOrnum	

== See also ==
- Tulsa Drillers

Preceded by Amarillo Giants	San Francisco Giants; Double-A affiliate 1975–1976	Succeeded by Waterbury Giants
