= Abbeville Athletics =

- 1935–1952; (1935–1939, 1946–1950, 1952); Abbeville, Louisiana

Minor league affiliations
- Previous classes: Class C (1949–1950, 1952); Class D (1935–1939, 1946–1948)
- League: Evangeline League (1935–1939, 1946–1950, 1952)

Major league affiliations
- Previous teams: New York Giants (1935); Philadelphia Athletics (1939)

Minor league titles
- Wild card berths (2): 1938; 1946

The Abbeville Athletics, also known as the Abbeville A's, were a minor league baseball team, based in Abbeville, Louisiana, that played in the Evangeline League from 1935–1939, 1946–1950, and 1952. The Athletics made it to the Evangeline League playoffs twice — in 1938 and 1946 — but never won the league pennant.

In 1934, a group of local businessmen, including Abbeville Mayor Fred T. Schlesinger, formed the Abbeville Athletic Association with the aim of funding construction of a grandstand and sports park on the grounds of Abbeville High School. The team name was chosen in 1935 after soliciting potential names from across Vermillion Parish. Some 60 names were proposed with "Athletics" being selected via a drawing.

== 1934–1940 ==
In late 1934, the Abbeville Athletic Association was accepted into the year-old Evangeline Baseball League as one of two expansion teams or the league's second season. At the same time, the club accepted an offer from the Nashville Vols, an affiliate of the New York Giants to establish a training camp and affiliation agreement. For the 1936 season, the Athletics affiliated with the Fort Worth Panthers of the Texas League, but in 1937 the Athletics changed owners and announced they would field an independent, unaffiliated team, saying that the Nashville and Fort Worth affiliations had not proved "satisfactory from a financial standpoint" and failed to deliver the talented players the team needed. Player turnover was extraordinarily high for the 1936 Athletics with more than 50 players rotating through the team's roster during the season.

In March 1940, the Athletics' owner I.M. Goldberg, in a dispute with the Evangeline League's leadership, surrendered the team's franchise. A group of local citizens sought to raise funds to keep the team in Abbeville and in the league, but ultimately the franchise was lost.

== 1946–1952 ==
In September 1945, Goldberg was active in efforts to restart the Evangeline League, which had folded in 1942 due to the Second World War, and when the league was reconstituted for the 1946 season, the Abbeville Athletics were again a participant. But by 1950, the team was in disarray and the league looked to move the franchise out of Abbeville. In January 1951, Goldberg abandoned his ownership of the Athletics and, despite an effort by local leaders to keep the team in Abbeville, the league welcomed the Crowley Millers into the league and the Athletics disbanded.

In 1952, the Athletics rejoined the Evangeline League, taking over the Hammond Berries' franchise. After a single season, however, the team lost the support of its affiliate, the Texarkana Bears, and ended up folding.

=== 1946 playoffs scandal ===
The Abbeville Athletics entered the playoffs in the number three slot, having ended the regular season 9.5 games behind the league-leading Houma Indians. After beating the Natchez Giants in the first round of the Evangeline League playoffs, the Athletics lost four games in the final seven-game post-season series against the Houma Indians. However, after the season ended, several Athletics and Indians players were investigated for throwing the playoff games. Athletics owner I.M. Goldberg claimed that Houma players had thrown game four in the first round series against the Alexandria Aces, as well as the first game against the Athletics. He also accused his players of throwing game four in the series against Houma. Four Houma players — Bill Thomas, Lanny Pecou, Alvin W. Kaiser, and Paul Fugit — along with Abbeville catcher Don Vetorel were suspended for conspiring with "New Orleans bookies" to manipulate the playoff series to benefit themselves "and their gambling friends." The players all denied the accusations. In August 1949, Thomas and Pecou were restored to eligibility and rejoined the Indians.

== Final standings by season ==
Season	Wins	Loses	Percentage	Notes
1935	54	73	.425	
1936	48	89	.350	
1937	63	72	.467	
1938	76	61	.555	Defeated the Alexandria Aces in the first round of playoffs, but lost the final series to the Lake Charles Skippers three games to four.
1939	65	70	.481	Nine wins were disallowed due to having played with an ineligible player, dropping the Athletics from fourth to sixth place in the league and keeping the team out of the Shaughnessy playoffs.
1946	82	48	.631	Defeated the Natchez Giants in the first round of playoffs, but lost the final series to the Houma Indians four games to one in a series marred by a gambling scandal.
1947	53	78	.405	
1948	53	82	.393	
1949	68	66	.507	
1950	50	87	.365	
1952	62	78	.443	
