= Gulf Coast League Athletics =

Minor league baseball team in the 1960s

- (1967-1968); Bradenton, Florida

Minor league affiliations
- Previous classes: Rookie
- Previous leagues: Gulf Coast League

Major league affiliations
- Previous teams: Oakland Athletics (1968); Kansas City Athletics (1967)

Minor league titles
- League titles (2): 1967; 1968

Team data
- Name: GCL Athletics

The Gulf Coast League Athletics were a minor league baseball team that played in Florida in the 1967 and 1968 seasons.

The club played in the rookie-level Gulf Coast League as an affiliate of the Kansas City/Oakland Athletics. The major league Athletics moved from Kansas City to Oakland after the 1967 season, but the GCL Athletics stayed in place until 1968. The GCL Athletics won the Gulf Coast League title in both years of their existence.

== Season-by-season ==
Season-by-season data from and.

Year	Record	Finish	Manager	Playoffs
1967	35-22	1st	Connie Ryan	League Champs; No playoffs
1968	39-21	1st	Billy Herman	League Champs; No playoffs
