= Houma Hawks =

- Founded in 2003; Houma, Louisiana

Minor league affiliations
- Class: Independent
- League: Southeastern League (2003)

Major league affiliations
- Team: None

Minor league titles
- League titles: None
- Division titles: None

Team data
- Name: Houma Hawks (2003)
- Ballpark: Southland Field
- Owner(s)/ Operator(s): Gus Brown, Jr.
- General manager: Gus Brown III

The Houma Hawks were a baseball team based in Houma, Louisiana. In 2003 they were expansion members of the Southeastern League of Professional Baseball. They played their home games in Houma, Louisiana at Southland Field.

This was the second stint of a professional baseball team in Houma. From 1946 through 1952, the Houma Indians of the Evangeline League played as the communities first professional baseball team.

== History ==
The team was officially announced to the public on October 24, 2002, at the Terrebonne Parish Courthouse Annex. The team was the brainchild of Gus Brown, Jr., the teams CEO and his son Gus Brown III, the teams’ general manager. For the inaugural season, the United Parcel Service was the teams’ primary sponsor. Locally, games were broadcast on KTIB 640-AM in Houma.

In May 2003 the name of the mascot was released following an internet poll to determine the name. "Parrain" the Hawk received 52 percent of the votes, while "Homer" the Hawk was in second place. On May 16, spring training commenced at Vandebilt Catholic High School.

The team would open exhibition play on May 24 with a pair of losses to Southern University before notching their first win against Gauthier and Amedee, an American Legion team by a score of 9–6 on May 26. The 72-game regular season would commence on May 30.

The team would open the 2003 season at home against the Pensacola Pelicans, and defeat the defending league champs by a score of 11-5 behind pitching ace Steven Locklar. Infielder Ray Crawford was 4–4 in the game with a pair of RBIs. Todd Brown also drove home a pair of runs in the home opener.

However, ownership failed to submit the proper workers' compensation paperwork to the state in order to use Southland Field. As a result, the Hawks would play home games at Morgan City High School stadium in Morgan City and at East St. John High School stadium in Reserve in June. By July, the team has even gone as far as to have eight home games at Pete Goldsby Park in Baton Rouge. By the end of the season, the team would simply play their "home" games at the visitors’ ballpark.

The team would disband after the 2003 season, and in January 2004, the former ownership would file suit against the Terrebonne Parish Recreation District 2–3, claiming a breach of contract after the team only was able to play three games at Southland Field after completing renovations.

=== 2003 partial roster ===
- Calvin Lee, pitcher
- Raul Rivera, pitcher
- Steve Locklar, pitcher
- Steven Bourgeois, pitcher
- Shane Landry, pitcher
- Dustin Wagoner, pitcher
- Ted Sutton, pitcher
- Josh Kaplan, pitcher
- Tharun Anderson, catcher
- Ray Crawford, infield
- Jaime Malvé, catcher
- Todd Brown, infielder
- Tony James, infielder
- Eric Brown, outfielder
- Larry Bethea, 1st base
- Shawn Woodland, catcher
- Nelson Villalobos Jr, Pitcher
- Eric Martanovic, Pitcher
- James Hamon, Pitcher
- Travis Boyll, Pitcher
- Wil Guidebeck, Utility
