= La La Regira Field =

Baseball stadium in Donaldsonville, Louisiana, US

Coordinates: 30.097683°N 90.983625°W

La La Regira Field is a baseball stadium located in Donaldsonville, Louisiana, colloquially referred to as "The La La Field". La La Regira Field is currently home to the Ascension Catholic High School baseball team. It was previously used by the Donaldsonville Grays semi-pro baseball team, Donaldsonville High School and American Legion Baseball.

The bleachers are made of wood under a covered area with steel and brick supports. The stadium holds 1,500 spectators.
