= Carlos Moore =

American baseball player (1906-1958)

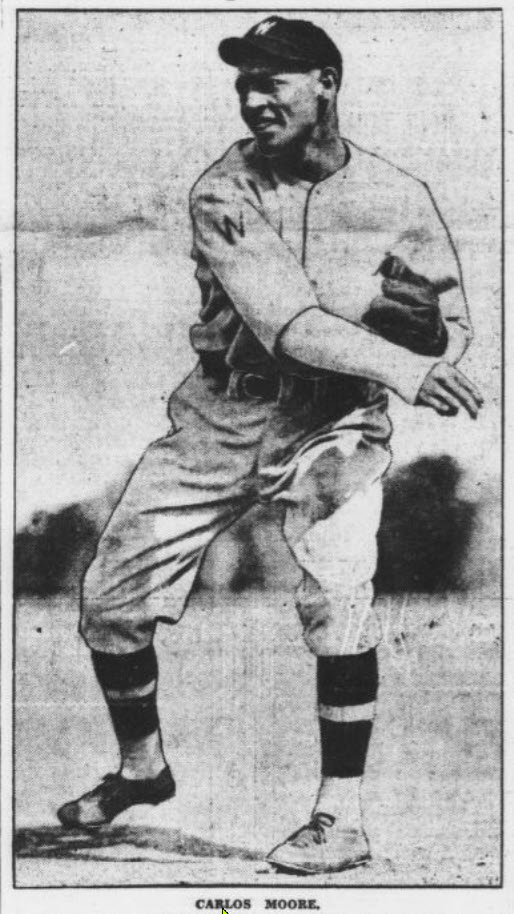
- Pitcher
- Born: August 13, 1906; Clinton, Tennessee, U.S.
- Died: July 2, 1958 (aged 51); New Orleans, Louisiana, U.S.
- Batted: Right Threw: Right

MLB debut
- May 4, 1930, for the Washington Senators

Last MLB appearance
- May 30, 1930, for the Washington Senators

MLB statistics
- Win–loss record: 0–0
- Earned run average: 2.31
- Strikeouts: 2
- Stats at Baseball Reference

Teams
- Washington Senators (1930)

Carlos Whitman Moore (August 13, 1906 – July 2, 1958) is an American former Major League Baseball player. A right-handed pitcher, Moore had a listed weight of 180 pounds (82 kg).

Moore's playing career in the majors spanned one month. He made his major league debut with the Washington Senators on May 4, 1930, and pitched his final game with them on May 30. He was effective in his four games on the mound, posting a 2.31 ERA in 11 2/3 of relief work and allowing only 13 baserunners.

After the end of Moore's playing career, he worked as a manager in the minor leagues. While working in this capacity for the Jeanerette Blues of the Evangeline League, Moore noted the strong throwing arm of his team's weak-hitting first baseman Eddie Lopat, and he suggested that Lopat might want to consider a career as a pitcher. Lopat subsequently developed into an All-Star, winning 166 major league games and earning five World Series rings in the starting rotation of the New York Yankees.
