= Alexandria White Sox =

- 1907–1908; Alexandria, Louisiana

Minor league affiliations
- Class: Class D (1907–1908)
- League: Gulf Coast League (1907–1908)

Major league affiliations
- Team: None

Minor league titles
- League titles (0): None

Team data
- Name: Alexandria White Sox (1907–1908)
- Ballpark: Unknown (1907–1908)

The Alexandria White Sox were a minor league baseball franchise based in Alexandria, Louisiana. In 1907 and 1908, the White Sox played exclusively as members of the Class D level Gulf Coast League. The Gulf Coast League folded during the 1908 season.

== History ==
Minor league baseball began in Alexandria, Louisiana in 1907, when the White Sox began play as charter members of the six–team Class D level Gulf Coast League. The Lafayette Browns, Lake Charles Creoles, Monroe Municipals, Opelousas Indians and Orange Hoo-Hoos joined Alexandria as founding members.

The Alexandria White Sox finished their first season of play in second place. With a 64–50 record in 1907, playing under manager Jack Auslet, Alexandria finished 7.0 games behind the first place Lake Charles Creoles in the final standings. Silver Braun of Alexandria, led the league in batting average, hitting .348, while his White Sox teammate H.B. Weeks led the league in wins, with 20.

The 1908 Alexandria White Sox folded along with the league during the season. After beginning play on April 30, 1908, the Gulf Coast League folded on June 3, 1908. At the time the league folded, Alexandria had a record of 14–15, playing under manager Henry Hoffman. The White Sox finished she shortened season in third place 5.0 games behind the first place St. Charles Creoles.

The 1909 Alexandria Hoo Hoos continued minor league play as members of the Arkansas State League, with Jack Auslet returning as manager.

== The ballpark ==
The name of the home ballpark for the 1907 and 1908 Alexandria White Sox is not known.

== Timeline ==
Year(s)	# Yrs.	Team	Level	League
1907–1908	2	Alexandria White Sox	Class D	Gulf Coast League

== Year–by–year records ==
Year	Record	Finish	Manager	Playoffs/Notes
1907	64–50	2nd	Jack Auslet	No playoffs held
1908	14–15	3rd	Henry Hoffman	League folded June 3

== Notable alumni ==
- Ernie Herbert (1908)
- Alexandria White Sox players
