= Thibodaux Pilots =

The Thibodaux Pilots were a minor-league baseball team based in Thibodaux, Louisiana. The team played in 1954 in the Evangeline League.

In 1954, the Texas City Pilots joined the Evangeline League, but moved to Thibodaux, Louisiana on June 17, 1954, becoming the Thibodaux Pilots.
