= Crowley Rice Birds =

The Crowley Rice Birds were a Minor League Baseball team based in Crowley, Louisiana, that played in the Gulf Coast League in 1908.
