= Donaldsonville Grays =

- Donaldsonville, Louisiana

Team data
- Previous names: Donaldsonville Greys

The Donaldsonville Grays were a semi-pro baseball team that operated in Louisiana. The team was based in Donaldsonville, Louisiana and played its home games at La La Regira Field. The team played as early as 1902 and as late as 1972.

== Notable players ==
- Mel Ott, National Baseball Hall of Fame member
