= Florida Complex League =

American minor baseball league

- Formerly: Gulf Coast League (1966–2020); Florida Rookie League (1965); Sarasota Rookie League (1964)
- Classification: Rookie
- Sport: Baseball
- Founded: 1964 (62 years ago)
- No. of teams: 15
- Country: United States
- Most recent champion: FCL Astros (2026)
- Most titles: FCL Yankees (13)
- Website: www.milb.com/florida-complex

The Florida Complex League (FCL) is a rookie-level Minor League Baseball league that operates in Florida, United States. Before 2021, it was known as the Gulf Coast League (GCL). Together with the Arizona Complex League (ACL), it forms the lowest rung on the North American minor-league ladder.

FCL teams play at the minor league spring training complexes of their parent Major League Baseball (MLB) clubs and are owned by those parent clubs. Admission is not charged to FCL games, and no concessions are sold. Every Grapefruit League team fields at least one team in the league. Night games are commonly played in the spring training stadium, although games may also be played at the team's practice fields.

As of the 2021 season, there is no league limit to how many players can be on an active roster, but no team can have more than three players with four or more years of minor-league experience. Major-league players on rehabilitation assignments may also appear in the league.

== History ==
Complex-based baseball leagues, which played before sparse crowds and often scheduled morning games to avoid the summer heat and afternoon thunderstorms, were adopted after the drastic shrinking of minor league baseball during the 1950s and 1960s. MLB teams needed an entry level to professional baseball for 18- and 19-year-old players graduating from high schools or signed from Latin America. They replaced Class C and Class D leagues as the lowest rung on the minor league ladder.

The current league was founded in 1964 as the Sarasota Rookie League (SRL) with four teams playing in Sarasota. It was originally intended to be the Gulf Coast division of a statewide rookie league, with the eastern division Cocoa Rookie League based in Cocoa. However, the eastern and western teams never played each other. The SRL's four teams consisted of squads sponsored by the Chicago White Sox, Milwaukee Braves, New York Yankees, and St. Louis Cardinals. The SRL Braves, managed by Paul Snyder, future Atlanta farm system director, won the championship with a 36–23 record.

- SRL Braves
- SRL Cardinals
- SRL White Sox
- SRL Yankees

The league added teams in Bradenton in 1965 and changed its name to the Florida Rookie League.

- FRL Astros
- FRL Braves
- FRL Cardinals
- FRL Twins
- FRL White Sox
- FRL Yankees

=== Gulf Coast League ===
The league renamed itself the Gulf Coast League (GCL) for the 1966 season. It expanded to Florida's east coast in the 1990s while retaining the name.

Historically, three separate leagues also used the Gulf Coast League name: a 1907–1908 Class D league, a 1926 Class D league and a 1950–1953 Class C (1950) and Class B League.

The 1907 founding members were the Alexandria White Sox, Lafayette Browns, Lake Charles Creoles, Monroe Municipals, Opelousas Indians and Orange Hoo-Hoos.

The 1926 Gulf Coast League was a four-team Class D level league. The league featured the Beeville Bees/Laredo Oilers (59–41), Corpus Christi Seahawks (43–58), Kingsville Jerseys/McAllen Palms/Mission Grapefruiters (46–52) and Victoria Rosebuds/Edinburg Bobcats (51–48) teams.

The 1950–1953 version of the Gulf Coast League featured the Brownsville Charros, Corpus Christi Aces, Galveston White Caps, Harlingen Capitals, Lake Charles Lakers, Laredo Apaches, Port Arthur Seahawks and Texas City Texans. The Crowley Millers, Jacksonville Jax, Lufkin/Leesville Angels played in the league in 1950. All three versions of the league operated around the Gulf coasts of Texas and Louisiana.

On June 21, 2016, the GCL hired Jen Pawol, the first female umpire in Minor League Baseball since 2007, and the first in the GCL since 1978. In 2017, the GCL hired another woman umpire, Emma Charlesworth-Seiler.

The start of the 2020 season was postponed due to the COVID-19 pandemic before ultimately being canceled on June 30.

=== Florida Complex League ===
Prior to the 2021 season, in continuation of MLB's reorganization of the minor leagues, the two US-based complex leagues were renamed, with the Gulf Coast League becoming the Florida Complex League (FCL).

== League format ==
Locations of teams in the Florida Complex League

The league plays a 52- to 56-game season that traditionally began in mid-June and concluded in late August. Following the relocation of the Atlanta Braves spring training complex in 2019, teams in the league were divided into three divisions: East, North, and South (down from four in 2018). Beginning with the 2024 season, both the Arizona Complex League and Florida Complex League seasons commence in early May and conclude in late July.

As of 2022, four teams—three division winners and one wild card team—qualify for the playoffs seeded by winning percentage regardless of division standing, with seeds 1 vs. 4 and 2 vs. 3 playing in a single-game semi-final. A best-of-three series between the two semi-final winners follows to determine the league champion.

== Current teams ==
Teams in the league are not referred to by their home city, but simply by their parent club's name. A prefix of FCL (previously GCL) is typically used to differentiate the team from its parent club and other farm teams with the same nickname. At times, a parent club has fielded two teams in the league at the same time, in which case a suffix has been added to each of those teams' names, such as a direction (e.g. East, West) or a color (e.g. Blue, Orange). Some teams share stadiums with their club's Single-A affiliate in the Florida State League. Note that Single-A teams do use city names—for example the Tampa Tarpons, who also use the Yankees' spring training complex.

After the Houston Astros and Kansas City Royals each fielded two teams as late as 1981, no franchise did so until the New York Yankees in 2013. The Yankees were joined by the Detroit Tigers and Philadelphia Phillies in fielding two teams in 2016 and 2018, respectively. As of the 2025 season, no major league clubs field more than one team in the FCL.

Division	Team	MLB affiliation	City	Stadium	Capacity
East	FCL Astros	Houston Astros	West Palm Beach, Florida	Cacti Park of the Palm Beaches	6,500
East	FCL Cardinals	St. Louis Cardinals	Jupiter, Florida	Roger Dean Chevrolet Stadium	7,200
East	FCL Marlins	Miami Marlins	Jupiter, Florida	Roger Dean Chevrolet Stadium	7,200
East	FCL Mets	New York Mets	Port St. Lucie, Florida	Clover Park	7,160
East	FCL Nationals	Washington Nationals	West Palm Beach, Florida	Cacti Park of the Palm Beaches	6,500
North	FCL Blue Jays	Toronto Blue Jays	Dunedin, Florida	Bobby Mattick Training Center at Englebert Complex	5,500
North	FCL Phillies	Philadelphia Phillies	Clearwater, Florida	Carpenter Complex	500
North	FCL Tigers	Detroit Tigers	Lakeland, Florida	Publix Field at Joker Marchant Stadium	8,500
North	FCL Yankees	New York Yankees	Tampa, Florida	George M. Steinbrenner Field	11,000
South	FCL Braves	Atlanta Braves	North Port, Florida	CoolToday Park	9,500
South	FCL Orioles	Baltimore Orioles	Sarasota, Florida	Ed Smith Stadium	8,340
South	FCL Pirates	Pittsburgh Pirates	Bradenton, Florida	Pirate City	7,500
South	FCL Rays	Tampa Bay Rays	Port Charlotte, Florida	Charlotte Sports Park	7,000
South	FCL Red Sox	Boston Red Sox	Fort Myers, Florida	JetBlue Park at Fenway South	8,000
South	FCL Twins	Minnesota Twins	Fort Myers, Florida	Lee County Sports Complex	7,500

== Past teams ==
- Gulf Coast League Athletics (1967–1968)
- Gulf Coast League Cubs (1972–1982, 1993–1996)
  - Became the Arizona League Cubs in 1997
- Gulf Coast League Dodgers (1983–1992, 2001–2008)
  - Became the Arizona League Dodgers in 2009
- Gulf Coast League Expos (1969–1970; 1974; 1977; 1986–2004)
  - Became the Gulf Coast League Nationals in 2005
- Gulf Coast League Indians (1967–1975, 1988–1990, 2006–2008)
  - Became the Arizona League Indians in 2009
- Gulf Coast League Padres (1981–1982)
- Gulf Coast League Rangers (1973–2002)
  - Became the Arizona League Rangers in 2003
- Gulf Coast League Red Birds (1972–1973)
- Gulf Coast League Reds (1968–1973, 1984–1990, 1999–2009)
  - Became the Arizona League Reds in 2010
- Gulf Coast League Royals (1971–1983; 1985–2002)
  - Included the GCL Royals Academy (defunct 1974), GCL Royals Blue (1979–1981), and GCL Royals Gold (1979–1981)
  - Became the Arizona League Royals in 2003
- Gulf Coast League Tourists (1970)
- Gulf Coast League White Sox (1966–1977, 1980–1997)
  - Became the Arizona League White Sox in 1998

== League champions: 1964–present ==
Numbers in parentheses indicate a franchise's instance of winning the championship, after its first instance.

- 1964 – SRL Braves
- 1965 – FRL Astros
- 1966 – GCL Yankees
- 1967 – GCL Athletics
- 1968 – GCL Athletics (2)
- 1969 – GCL Expos
- 1970 – GCL White Sox
- 1971 – GCL Royals
- 1972 – GCL Cubs
- 1973 – GCL Rangers
- 1974 – GCL Cubs (2)
- 1975 – GCL Rangers (2)
- 1976 – GCL Rangers (3)
- 1977 – GCL White Sox (2)
- 1978 – GCL Rangers (4)
- 1979 – GCL Astros (2)
- 1980 – GCL Royals Blue
- 1981 – GCL Royals Gold
- 1982 – GCL Yankees (2)
- 1983 – GCL Dodgers
- 1984 – GCL Rangers (5)
- 1985 – GCL Yankees (3)
- 1986 – GCL Dodgers (2)
- 1987 – GCL Dodgers (3)
- 1988 – GCL Yankees (4)
- 1989 – GCL Yankees (5)
- 1990 – GCL Dodgers (4)
- 1991 – GCL Expos (2)
- 1992 – GCL Royals (2)
- 1993 – GCL Rangers (6)
- 1994 – GCL Astros (3)
- 1995 – GCL Royals (3)
- 1996 – GCL Yankees (6)
- 1997 – GCL Mets
- 1998 – GCL Rangers (7)
- 1999 – GCL Mets (2)
- 2000 – GCL Rangers (8)
- 2001 – GCL Yankees (7)
- 2002 – GCL Phillies
- 2003 – GCL Braves (2)
- 2004 – GCL Yankees (8)
- 2005 – GCL Yankees (9)
- 2006 – GCL Red Sox
- 2007 – GCL Yankees (10)
- 2008 – GCL Phillies (2)
- 2009 – GCL Nationals
- 2010 – GCL Phillies (3)
- 2011 – GCL Yankees (11)
- 2012 – GCL Pirates
- 2013 – GCL Nationals (2)
- 2014 – GCL Red Sox (2)
- 2015 – GCL Red Sox (3)
- 2016 – GCL Cardinals
- 2017 – GCL Yankees East (12)
- 2018 – GCL Tigers West
- 2019 – No champion†
- 2020 – No season‡
- 2021 – FCL Rays (Note: In 2021, the league did not have a postseason; FCL Rays had the best winning percentage for the season, 42–15 (.737).)
- 2022 – FCL Yankees (13)
- 2023 – FCL Braves (3)
- 2024 – FCL Tigers (2)
- 2025 – FCL Blue Jays
- 2026 – FCL Astros (4)

† 2019 playoffs canceled due to Hurricane Dorian
‡ 2020 season canceled due to COVID-19 pandemic

== See also ==
- List of Florida Complex League team rosters
- Baseball awards § U.S. minor leagues

== Sources ==
- Johnson, Lloyd; Wolff, Miles (2007). The Encyclopedia of Minor League Baseball (3rd ed.). Durham, North Carolina: Baseball America.
