= Thibodaux Senators =

The Thibodaux Senators were a minor-league baseball team based in Thibodaux, Louisiana. The team played from 1956 to 1957 in the Evangeline League.
