= Shreveport Braves =

The Shreveport Braves were a minor-league baseball team based from Shreveport, Louisiana. The team played from 1968 to 1970 in the Texas League and was affiliated with the Atlanta Braves. They were the first team in Shreveport for Professional Baseball in 6 years, (1961-1968) after the Southern Association folded in 1961.
