= Shreveport Shockhers =

- Founded: 2006
- League: National Women's Football Association (2006)
- Based in: Shreveport, Louisiana

The Shreveport Shockhers was a professional American football team that played during the 2006 season as part of the National Women's Football Association. They played their home games in Shreveport, Louisiana.

The team finished with a 1–7 record in their lone season.
