= Shreveport Tigers =

Baseball team from the United States of America

The Shreveport Tigers were a minor-league baseball team based in Shreveport, Louisiana. The team played during the 1899 season in the Southern League.

The Negro league Shreveport Tigers played in the Negro Texas League.
