= Opelousas Orphans =

- 1932–1932; Opelousas, Louisiana

Minor league affiliations
- League: Cotton States League (1922–1932)

Team data
- Previous names: Port Arthur Refiners (1932); DeQuincy Railroaders (1932); Opelousas Orphans (1932)

The Opelousas Orphans, DeQuincy Railroaders and Port Arthur Refiners were a minor league baseball team that operated in 1932 in the Cotton States League. The team played the season in Opelousas, Louisiana, Dequincy, Louisiana and Port Arthur, Texas.
