= Shreveport Grays =

The Shreveport Grays were a minor-league baseball team based in Shreveport, Louisiana. The team played in 1895 in the Texas-Southern League.

== See also ==
Historical Minor League Statistics
