= Thibodaux Giants =

Minor league baseball team in Thibodaux, Louisiana

The Thibodaux Giants were a minor league baseball team based in Thibodaux, Louisiana, United States that played in the Evangeline League from 1946 to 1953. They were affiliated with the Atlanta Crackers in 1953.

Over the course of their existence, they appeared in the playoffs six times, winning the league championship in 1953 under manager William Adams.
