= Lafayette, Louisiana minor league baseball history =

Lafayette, Louisiana minor league teams
- 1907–2000; (1907, 1920, 1934–1942, 1948–1957 1975–1976, 1998–2000)

Minor league affiliations
- Class: Class D (1907, 1920, 1934–1942, 1948); Class C (1949–1957); Class AA (1975–1976); Independent (1998–2000)
- League: Gulf Coast League (1907); Louisiana State League (1920); Evangeline League (1934–1942, 1948–1953, 1954–1957); Texas League (1975-1976)); Texas-Louisiana League (1998-2000)

Major league affiliations
- Team: St. Louis Browns (1936–1941); Chicago Cubs (1955–1957)

Minor league titles
- League titles (5): 1934; 1939; 1955; 1956; 1975 (co-champions)
- Conference titles (1): 1950

Team data
- Name: Lafayette Browns (1907); Lafayette Hubs (1920); Lafayette White Sox (1934–1942); Lafayette Bulls (1948–1953); Lafayette Oilers (1954–1957); Lafayette Drillers (1975–1976); Bayou Bullfrogs (1998–2000)
- Ballpark: Parkdale Park (1934–1942); Braham Stadium (1948-1953); Clark Field (1954–1957, 1975–1976); Tigue Moore Field (1998–2000)

Minor league baseball teams were based in Lafayette, Louisiana between 1907 and 2000. Lafayette teams played as members of the 1907 Gulf Coast League, the 1920 Louisiana State League, and the Evangeline League (1934–1942, 1948–1957). Lafayette teams won four league championships and one pennant in the era. The early Lafayette teams preceded the 1975 and 1976 Lafayette Drillers, who played as members of the Texas League and the 1998 to 2000 Bayou Bullfrogs of the Texas-Louisiana League.

Lafayette teams played as minor league affiliates of the St. Louis Browns from 1936 to 1941, the Chicago Cubs from 1955 to 1957, and the San Francisco Giants in 1975 and 1976.

== History ==
In 1907, Minor League Baseball began in Lafayette. The Lafayette Browns became members of the six–team Class D level Gulf Coast League. The Lafayette Browns finished with a 48–64 record and in 5th place in the 1907 regular standings. Lafayette played along with the Lake Charles Creoles (74–46), eventual champion Alexandria White Sox (64–50), Monroe Municipals (63–55), Orange Hoo-Hoos (50–65) and Opelousas Indians (48–67). The Lafayette franchise folded following the 1907 season.

Minor league baseball returned in 1920, with the Lafayette Hubs. The Hubs were members of the short–lived Louisiana State League. On July 15, 1920, the Hubbs were in third place with a 36–31 record when the six–team league folded.

=== Evangeline League ===
After 12 years, the Lafayette White Sox began play as charter members of the 1934 Evangeline League, winning the first league championship. The White Sox won their first league championship in 1934 and another in 1939. Their 1939 regular season record was 93–49. On April 21, 1935, White Sox pitcher William Dowie threw a no–hitter against the Rayne Rice Birds, winning 3–0. Lafayette had a second no–hitter on May 2, 1939, when Lafayette pitcher Cornelius English pitched a no–hitter in a 4–0 victory over the Alexandria Aces. Despite the moniker, the White Sox were affiliates of the St. Louis Browns from 1936 to 1941. On May 22, 1942, the Lafayette White Sox franchise disbanded.

In 1948, the Lafayette Bulls returned to play as members of the Evangeline League, taking the spot of the Natchez franchise which had left to join the Cotton States League. Lafayette would remain in the league until it folded after the 1957 season. The Bulls captured the regular season title in 1950. The franchise changed their moniker to become the Lafayette Oilers in 1954. The Oilers were affiliates of the Chicago Cubs from 1955 to 1957. The Oilers won the 1955 Evangeline League Championship and had the best record in the 1956 season when no playoffs took place. On June 20, 1957, the team disbanded.

The Evangeline League permanently folded following the 1957 season and had never become an integrated league, despite the efforts of major league affiliates (the Chicago Cubs) to assign players to the Lafayette Oilers and integrate team rosters. In 1956, some boycotts of attending games occurred after the Lafayette Oilers refused to accept the players and Lafayette Parrish, home of the Baton Rouge Rebels, passed legislation making it illegal for black players to play in its ballparks. The Evangeline League itself also officially banned non-white players from appearing on their rosters. These blocks forced the major league teams to reassign the players to other leagues. Due to boycotts, the 1956 playoff finals, featuring Lafayette, were cancelled. Both the Lafayette Oilers and the Baton Rouge Rebels folded before the end of the 1957 season, on June 20, 1957.

=== Texas League ===
Minor league baseball returned to Lafayette, Louisiana in 1975. The Lafayette Drillers began play as an affiliate of the San Francisco Giants. The Drillers became members of the Class AA Texas League and won the Texas League Championship in their first season. Lafayette finished 72–57 to finish first in the Eastern Division. In the 1975 playoffs, the Midland Cubs and Lafayette Drillers were tied 2 games to 2 when rain prevented completion of the series. The teams were declared co–champions. After finishing 58–76 in the 1976 season, the franchise was purchased by the Texas Rangers and relocated to become the Tulsa Drillers.

=== Texas-Louisiana League ===
Beginning in 1998, the Bayou Bullfrogs played as members of the Independent level Texas-Louisiana League through 2000. In 1998, Lafayette finished 36–48, placing fifth in the standings, under managers Andy Skeels and Steve Dillard. The Bullfrogs folded after the 2000 season, after placing sixth with a 32–51 record in 1999 and seventh with a 46–66 record in 2000.

== The ballparks ==
From 1934 to 1942, the Lafayette White Sox played at Parkdale Park. The ballpark had a capacity of 3,500, with dimensions of (Left, Center, Right): 303–375–280. Parkdale Park was located at East Simcoe & Jefferson Boulevard in Lafayette, Louisiana.

Beginning in 1954, Lafayette teams played at Clark Field, newly built on a filled-in lake. The ballpark was torn down in 2000.

The Bayou Bullfrogs played at Tigue Moore Field from 1998 to 2000. Built in 1979, the ballpark is still in use today, as home to the Louisiana Ragin' Cajuns baseball team. The ballpark is located at 121 Reinhardt Drive, Lafayette, Louisiana.

== Timeline ==
Year(s)	# Yrs.	Team	Level	League
1907	1	Lafayette Browns	Class D	Gulf Coast League
1920	1	Lafayette Hubs	Class D	Louisiana State League
1934–1942	9	Lafayette White Sox	Class D	Evangeline League
1948	1	Lafayette Bulls	Class D	Evangeline League
1949–1953	5	Lafayette Bulls	Class C	Evangeline League
1954–1957	4	Lafayette Oilers	Class C	Evangeline League
1975–1976	2	Lafayette Drillers	Class AA	Texas League
1998–2000	3	Bayou Bullfrogs	Independent	Texas-Louisiana League

== Notable alumni ==
- Gary Alexander (1975)
- Milt Byrnes (1936)
- Earl Caldwell (1953)
- Jack Clark (1975) 4x MLB All-Star; San Francisco Giants Wall of Fame
- Steve Dillard (1998, MGR)
- Rob Dressler (1975)
- Lou Klein (1955)
- Jack Kramer (1936–1937) 3x MLB All-Star
- Clyde McCullough (1935) 2x MLB All-Star
- Bill Pleis (1957)
- Ken Raffensberger (1956) MLB All-Star
- Dave Stenhouse (1956) 2x MLB All-Star
- Harry Strohm (1948–1950)
- Al Zarilla (1939) MLB All-Star
