= Jeanerette Blues =

- 1934–1939; Jeanerette, Louisiana

Minor league affiliations
- Previous classes: Class D - (1934–1939)
- League: Evangeline League (1934–1939)

Major league affiliations
- Previous teams: Brooklyn Dodgers (1936)

Minor league titles
- League titles: 1 (1935)

Team data
- Previous names: Jeanerette Blues (1934–1939); Lake Charles Explorers (1934)

The Jeanerette Blues were a minor league baseball team that operated from 1934 to 1939. They were originally known as the Lake Charles Explorers and were based in Lake Charles, Louisiana, but moved to Jeanerette when a fire destroyed their stadium during the 1934 season. When it launched in Lake Charles, the team was affiliated with the Fort Worth Cats of the Texas League and Cats rookies made up much of the initial squad. The team folded after the 1939 season. The Blues appeared in the Evangeline League's Shaughnessy playoffs three times between 1935 and 1939, winning the league pennant in 1935.
