= Crowley Millers =

Minor League Baseball team

- 1950–1957; (1950–1957); Crowley, Louisiana

Minor league affiliations
- Previous classes: Class C (1950–1957)
- League: Gulf Coast League (1950); Evangeline League (1951–1957)

Major league affiliations
- Previous teams: Kansas City Athletics (1956–1957)

Minor league titles
- League titles (1): 1952
- Wild card berths (5): 1950; 1952; 1953; 1954; 1956

The Crowley Millers were a Minor League Baseball team based in Crowley, Louisiana, that played in the Gulf Coast League in 1950 and the Evangeline League from 1951 to 1957. They were affiliated with the Kansas City Athletics in 1956 and 1957. They won the league championship in 1952 with an 81–59 record.

Crowley, Louisiana, has been a steppingstone for athletes in many sports, but especially baseball. Gaylon H. White, author of five books about minor league baseball players and their teams, wrote a book about the Crowley Millers, the excitement and the tragedies surrounding many of the players.

One tragic event took place in June 1951, when Andy Strong, playing centerfield for Crowley in a game against the Alexandria Aces at Bringhurst Field, was struck and killed by lightning. Among the players who played for them was Al Silvera.
