= New Iberia Cardinals =

- (1934-1942, 1946-1955); New Iberia, Louisiana

Minor league affiliations
- Class: Class-D
- Previous leagues: Evangeline League

Major league affiliations
- Previous teams: Pittsburgh Pirates (1948); Boston Red Sox (1946); St. Louis Cardinals (1935-1941)

Minor league titles
- League titles: 2 (1941, 1954)

Team data
- Previous names: New Iberia Indians (1956); New Iberia Pelicans (1948, 1951-1952, 1954-1955); New Iberia Cardinals (1934-1942, 1946-1947, 1949, 1953); New Iberia Rebels (1950)
- Ballpark: Acadian Park

The New Iberia Cardinals were an Evangeline League baseball team that played under various names from 1934 to 1956.

From 1934 to 1942, 1946 to 1947, in 1949 and in 1953, they were known as the New Iberia Cardinals. They were based in New Iberia, Louisiana, and were affiliated with the St. Louis Cardinals from 1935 to 1941 and the Boston Red Sox in 1946. One of their home ball parks was Acadian Park. They won one league championship, in 1941 under Johnny Keane.

In 1948, from 1951 to 1952 and from 1954 to 1955, they were known as the New Iberia Pelicans. In 1948, they were affiliated with the Pittsburgh Pirates and from 1954 to 1955 they were affiliated with the Atlanta Crackers of the Southern Association. They played their home games in Acadian Park.

In 1950, they were called the New Iberia Rebels. They were managed by Sid Gautreaux, who led them to a 66–73 record. Their home ballpark was Acadian Park. In their final season, 1956, they were called the New Iberia Indians until their disbanding on May 19. The team was managed by Al Barillari and played their home games at Acadian Park. They were the last minor league baseball team to ever play in New Iberia.

== See also ==
- New Iberia Sugar Boys
