= Evangeline Baseball League =

Professional baseball league

Evangeline League
- Most recent season or competition: 1957 Evangeline League season
- Classification: Class C (1949–1957); Class D (1934–1942, 1946–1948)
- Sport: Minor League Baseball
- First season: 1934
- Folded: 1957
- No. of teams: 17
- Country: United States

The Evangeline League was a low-level minor baseball league that existed from 1934 to 1957, except for during World War II.

It began in 1934 as a six–team Class D level league with teams based in Louisiana, United States, later adding Mississippi and Texas based franchises. In 1935, the league was expanded to eight teams and ceased operations in 1942, with six teams, during World War II. It resumed activities in 1946, getting promoted to Class C league in 1949, and lasted through 1957. The Alexandria Aces were the only team that played in all 21 regular seasons. For its entire existence, it was equivalent to a Rookie-level league in the current minor league structure.

Due to its association with spicy Cajun cuisine, the league was commonly referred to as the "Pepper Sauce League" or the "Tabasco Circuit". Newspapers often abbreviated the league's name as "Vangy" or "Vangey" in headlines.

== History ==
=== 1946 gambling scandal ===
The Evangeline League was affected by a gambling scandal that surfaced after the 1946 Championship series. After the completion of the playoffs, which were won by the Houma Indians, allegations emerged that Houma Indians and Abbeville Athletics players had conspired with gamblers to achieve desired outcomes of three playoff games. At the October 23, 1946 league meeting, it was alleged that Houma players conspired with gamblers for Houma to lose the fourth game of the first round of the playoffs, lose the first game of the second round and win the fourth game of the second round. After learning of the allegations, Judge W. G. Bramham, president of the National Association of Professional Baseball Leagues, summoned the unnamed accused players to attend a hearing on January 10–11, 1947. After interviews and further investigation, five players were put on the ineligible list, meaning they could not play in minor league baseball. Houma players William "Bill" Thomas, Leonard Pecou, Alvin Kaiser and Paul Fugit and Don Vettorel of Abbeville were placed on the ineligible list by Branham for their actions. Later, Thomas and Pecou appealed and were ultimately restored to eligibility by George Trautman, Bramham's successor after two years. On August 22, 1949, both players were reinstated and allowed to immediately to return to the Houma roster. After his reinstatement, Thomas would continue his career to set the minor league career records for total games, victories, losses, hits and runs. Baseball Reference shows his career record as 301–256 over 24 seasons, with statistics from some seasons missing. Other sources have his minor league win total at 383.

=== 1956–1957 boycotts ===
The Evangeline League permanently folded following the 1957 season. It never became an integrated league, despite the efforts of major league affiliates, such as the Chicago Cubs, which tried to assign black players to the Lafayette Oilers and integrate team rosters. In 1956, some boycotts of attending games began after Lafayette refused to accept the players to their team. Subsequently, Lafayette Parish, home of the Baton Rouge Rebels, made it illegal for black players to play in its ballparks. The Evangeline League itself also officially banned non-white players from appearing on their rosters. These blocks forced the major league teams to reassign the players to other leagues. Due to boycotts, the 1956 playoff finals, featuring Lafayette, were cancelled as a result. Both the Lafayette Oilers and the Baton Rouge Rebels folded before the end of the 1957 season, on June 20, 1957.

== Playoff history ==
Starting in its second year, the Evangeline League used a Shaughnessy two-round playoff system in which the teams with the teams with the first- and fourth-best records and the second- and third-best records would compete in a semifinal round with the winners competing for the league pennant. In 1948, the league canceled its playoffs due to bad weather, which had reduced attendance significantly, and again in 1956 due to "decreased interest and attendance." In both 1942 and 1957, the league folded before a playoff series could be held.

In terms of repeat league champions, the Hammond Berries won the pennant three times, as did the Lafayette White Sox/Oilers; the Alexandria Aces and New Iberia Cardinals/Pelicans won twice; and the Baton Rouge Red Sticks, Crowley Millers, Houma Indians, Jeanerette Blues, Lake Charles Skippers, Opelousas Indians, and Thibodaux Giants each won once.

== List of teams (in alphabetical order) ==
- Abbeville, LA: Abbeville Athletics (1935–1939, 1946–1950, 1952)
- Alexandria, LA: Alexandria Aces (1934–1942, 1946–1957)
- Baton Rouge, LA: Baton Rouge Red Sticks (1946–1955), Baton Rouge Rebels (1956–1957)
- Crowley, LA: Crowley Millers (1951–1957)
- Hammond, LA: Hammond Berries (1946–1951)
- Houma, LA: Houma Buccaneers (1940), Houma Indians (1946–1952)
- Jeanerette, LA: Jeanerette Blues (1935–1939)
- Lafayette, LA: Lafayette Bulls (1948–1953), Lafayette Oilers (1954–1957), Lafayette White Sox (1934–1942)
- Lake Charles, LA: Lake Charles Explorers (1934), Lake Charles Skippers (1935–1942), Lake Charles Lakers (1954–1955), Lake Charles Giants (1956–1957)
- Monroe, LA: Monroe Sports (1956)
- Natchez, MS: Natchez Pilgrims (1940–1941), Natchez Giants (1942, 1946–1947)
- New Iberia, LA: New Iberia Cardinals (1934–1942, 1946–1947, 1949, 1953), New Iberia Pelicans (1948, 1951–1952, 1954–1955); New Iberia Rebels (1950), New Iberia Indians (1956)
- Opelousas, LA: Opelousas Indians (1934–1941)
- Port Arthur, TX: Port Arthur Tarpons (1940–1942), Port Arthur Sea Hawks (1954)
- Rayne, LA: Rayne Red Sox (1934), Rayne Rice Birds (1935–1941)
- Texas City, TX: Texas City Pilots (1954)
- Thibodaux, LA: Thibodaux Giants (1946–1953), Thibodaux Pilots (1954), Thibodaux Senators (1956–1957)

== Etymology ==
- The league's name was derived from Evangeline, an Acadian girl made famous through a poem of Henry Wadsworth Longfellow.
