= Lake Charles, Louisiana minor league baseball history =

Lake Charles, Louisiana minor league baseball teams
- 1906–1957; (1906–1908, 1929–1930, 1934–1942, 1950–1957); Lake Charles, Louisiana

Minor league affiliations
- Class: Class C (1906–1908, 1929–1930, 1934–1942); Class B (1950–1953); Class C (1954–1957)
- League: South Texas League (1906); Gulf Coast League (1907–1908); Cotton States League (1929–1930); Evangeline League (1934–1942); Gulf Coast League (1950–1953); Evangeline League (1954–1957)

Major league affiliations
- Team: Detroit Tigers (1937); Cincinnati Reds (1935); Chicago Cubs (1941); New York Giants (1956)

Minor league titles
- League titles (3): 1907; 1908; 1938
- Conference titles (2): 1938; 1940
- Wild card berths (4): 1937; 1940; 1954; 1956

Team data
- Name: Lake Charles Creoles (1906–1908); Lake Charles Newporters (1929–1930); Lake Charles Explorers (1934); Lake Charles Skippers (1935–1942); Lake Charles Lakers (1950–1955); Lake Charles Giants (1956–1957)
- Ballpark: Athletic Field (1906–1908); American Legion Park/Killen Fild (1929–1930); Legion Field (1934–1957)

Minor league baseball teams were based in Lake Charles, Louisiana in various seasons between 1906 and 1957. Lake Charles teams played as members of the South Texas League (1906), Gulf Coast League (1907–1908), Cotton States League (1929–1930), Evangeline League (1934–1942), Gulf Coast League (1950–1953) and Evangeline League (1954–1957). Lake Charles teams won three league championships and two league pennants.

Lake Charles teams played as a minor league affiliate of the Cincinnati Reds in 1935, Detroit Tigers in 1937, Chicago Cubs in 1941 and New York Giants in 1956.

== History ==
Lake Charles minor league baseball began with the 1906 Lake Charles Creoles. The Creoles played in the South Texas League in 1906 and the Gulf Coast League in 1907 and 1908. Later, after a two decade stretch without a professional team, the Lake Charles Newporters formed as members of the Cotton States League, playing in 1929 and 1930. The 1934 Lake Charles Explorers, Lake Charles Skippers (1935–1942) and Lake Charles Giants (1956–1957) played as members of the Evangeline League.

The Lake Charles Creoles rebounded from a 30–94 initial season and captured the 1907 Gulf Coast League Championship. On May 8, 1907, Thomas Haley of the Creoles pitched a no–hitter in defeating the Lafayette Browns 3–0. In 1908, the Creoles were leading the standings with a 18–9 record, when the Gulf Coast League folded on June 3, 1908.

The Lake Charles Newporters were formed when the Meridian Mets franchise moved to Lake Charles on June 17, 1929. On August 9, 1929, Newporters pitcher Pete Newman pitched a no–hitter against the Vicksburg Hill Billies in a 5–0 victory. The Newporters finished the 1929 season with a 28–43 record. The Lake Chares Newporters were 24–37, when the team disbanded on June 17, 1930.

A new Legion Field was constructed in 1934. However, a fire destroyed the grandstands on May 29, 1934. Therefore, the Lake Charles Explorers of the Evangeline League were forced to finish the season in Jeanerette, Louisiana, playing as the Jeanerette Blues and spawning a new franchise in Jeanerette. The team had a 14–13 record based in Lake Charles and finished with a 39–42 overall record.

The Lake Charles Skippers were formed in 1935, beginning play in the rebuilt Legion Field. The Skippers were affiliates of the Cincinnati Reds in 1935, Detroit Tigers in 1937 and Chicago Cubs in 1941 while playing as members of the Evangeline League. The Skippers captured the Evangeline League Championship in 1938. The Evangeline League folded on May 30, 1942.

The 1950 Lake Charles Lakers were founding members of the revived Gulf Coast League and remained in the league through 1953. After the demise of the Gulf Coast League, the Lakers joined the 1954 Evangeline League, remaining as members through 1957. The unaffiliated Lakers finished no higher than fourth in any of their six seasons and never had a winning record.

In 1956, the franchise returned to play, as an affiliate of the New York Giants, becoming the Lake Charles Giants in returning to the Evangeline League. The Giants finished with a regular season record 62–62 in 1956, losing in the playoffs after a fourth place regular season. The Lake Charles Giants finished with a 43–67 in 1957 record, missing the playoffs with a fourth-place finish.

Following the 1957 season, Lake Charles has not hosted another minor league team.

== The ballparks ==
The Lake Charles Creoles were noted to have played home games at Athletic Field from 1906 to 1908. The Athletic Field was owned by the Lake Charles Athletic Association. The ballpark was utilized as a baseball spring training site by the Philadelphia Athletics.

The Lake Charles Newporters reportedly played home games at American Legion Park. American Legion Park was located on 3rd street, near Enterprise Avenue in Lake Charles, Louisiana. The original ballpark was later re-purposed and renamed Killen Field. Today, the site is still in use today as a high school football stadium and is called Cougar Stadium. There is an historical marker at the site honoring Killen Field.

Opening in 1934, Lake Charles minor league teams played home games at the new Legion Field. The ballpark is still in use today, located directly across the street from Cougar Stadium. The original grandstands burned down just two months after the ballpark originally opened, but they were rebuilt for the 1935 season. The ballpark also hosted games by the Kansas City Monarchs of the Negro leagues. In 2009, Legion Field was renovated and renamed "Alvin Dark Stadium at Legion Field", after Lake Charles native and big league player and manager Alvin Dark.

Alvin Dark Stadium at Legion Field is located at 1450 5th Street, Lake Charles, Louisiana. In 2019, the ballpark was chosen as a four-year host site for the "New Balance Future Stars Series National Championships" baseball series. The series is a national tournament for teams of top high school players.

== Notable alumni ==
- Ace Adams (1934–1935) MLB All–Star
- Felipe Alou (1956) 3x MLB All–Star; 1994 NL Manager of the Year; San Francisco Giants Wall of Fame
- Josh Billings (1935, MGR)
- Dave Garcia (1939)
- Art Griggs (1906)
- Johnny Hudson (1934)
- Denny Lyons (1906)
- Mike McCormick (1956, MGR)
- Pat Mullin (1937) 2x MLB All-Star
- Al Nixon (1930, MGR)
- Leo Posada (1954)
- Ben Paschal (1934)

== See also ==
- Lake Charles Skippers players
- Lake Charles Lakers players
- Lake Charles Newporters players
- Lake Charles Creoles players
- Lake Charles Giants players
