= Charles Carpenter =

Charles Carpenter may refer to:

- Charles Carpenter (American football) (1898–1960), American football player
- Charles Carpenter (bishop) (1899–1969), Episcopal bishop of Alabama
- Charles Carpenter (cricketer) (1837–1876), English cricketer
- Charles Carpenter (medical researcher), helped found the David Geffen School of Medicine at UCLA
- Charles Carpenter (musician), prolific songwriter active in the 1930s and 1940s (see "You Taught Me to Love Again")
- Charles Carpenter (pilot) (1913–1966), United States Army World War II pilot
- Charles Carpenter (Royal Navy officer), MP for Berwick-upon-Tweed, 1790–1796
- Charles C. Carpenter (settler), organized and instigated the first unauthorized attempt to homestead the Unassigned Lands in Oklahoma Territory in 1879
- Charles C. Carpenter (admiral) (1834–1899), United States Navy rear admiral
- Charles Congden Carpenter (1921–2016), naturalist and herpetologist
- Charles E. Carpenter (1845–1923), co-founder of Stone, Carpenter & Willson
- Charles F. Carpenter, president of the U.S. Tri-State League in baseball, 1906–1913
- Charles H. Carpenter, first photographer for the Field Museum, Chicago, 1899–1947
- Charles H. Carpenter, one of the Guantanamo Bay attorneys
- Charles I. Carpenter (1906–1994), first Chief of Chaplains of the United States Air Force
- Charles L. Carpenter (1902–1992), United States Navy admiral
- Charles K. Carpenter (1872–1948), American minister in northern Illinois
- Bubba Carpenter (Charles Sydney Carpenter, born 1968), Major League Baseball player
- Charles T. Carpenter (1858–1945), banker taken hostage by the Dalton Gang
- Charles U. Carpenter (1872–1928), American business manager and management author
- Charles William Carpenter (1886–1971), Baptist minister and civil rights activist
- Chuck Carpenter (Charles Scott Carpenter, born 1962), member of the Oregon House of Representatives
- Charles Carpenter, a character in Another Life, a Christian soap opera
