= Osceola Indians =

- 1936–1937; Osceola, Arkansas

Minor league affiliations
- Class: Class D (1936–1937)
- League: Northeast Arkansas League (1936–1937)

Major league affiliations
- Team: St. Louis Browns (1937)

Minor league titles
- League titles (0): None
- Wild card berths (0): None

Team data
- Name: Osceola Indians (1936–1937)
- Ballpark: High School Park (1936–1937)

The Osceola Indians were a minor league baseball team based in Osceola, Arkansas. In 1936 and 1937, Osceola played exclusively as members of the Northeast Arkansas League, with the team becoming a minor league affiliate of the St. Louis Browns in 1937. The Indians hosted minor league home games at the Osceola High School Park.

== History ==
The "Osceola Indians" were the only minor league baseball team hosted in Osceola, Arkansas, with the team beginning play in 1936 and folding after the 1937 season. In 1936, Osceola became charter members of the reformed Northeast Arkansas League, which began play as a six–team Class D level league. Osceola joined the league, which consisted of the Batesville White Sox, Jonesboro Giants, Newport Cardinals, Paragould Rebels and West Plains Badgers / Caruthersville Pilots as charter members.

The Indians finished as the runner up in the 1936 overall Northeast Arkansas League regular season standings, ending regular season with a 58–37 record, playing the season under manager Royce Williams. Osceola ended their first season of play in second place overall, finishing 8.0 games behind the first place Newport Cardinals in the overall standings.

Despite their second place overall finish, Osceola did not qualify for the 1936 playoffs as the Northeast Arkansas League played a split–season schedule and Osceola did not win either of the half–seasons. The Caruthersville Pilots won the championship playoff against Newport. Osceola pitcher Ernest Bingham of Osceola led the Northeast Arkansas League with 23 wins. Teammate Paul Rucker scored 90 runs to lead the league.

In their second season of play, the 1937 Osceola Indians became an affiliate of the St. Louis Browns. The Indians ended the 1937 season with a record of 49–60, placing fifth in the standings, playing the season under manager Elmer Kirchoff.

Future major league All-Star pitcher Johnny Sain pitched for Osceola in 1936 and 1937. Sain would become a three-time MLB All-Star, six-time world series champion and earn induction into the Braves Hall of Fame. After graduating from Havana High School in Arkansas, Sain reportedly approached Doc Prothro, who was managing the minor league Little Rock Travelers and signed a contract for $5.00, before reporting to play for Osceola.

After drawing 7,830 total fans for their 1937 home games, the Osceola franchise folded after the 1937 season, replaced by the Batesville White Sox in the 1938 Northeast Arkansas League. Osceola, Arkansas has not hosted another minor league team.

== The ballpark ==
The Osceola Indians were noted to have played minor league home games at the High School Ballpark. The ballpark was located at Osceola High School, 2800 West Semmes Avenue, in Osceola.

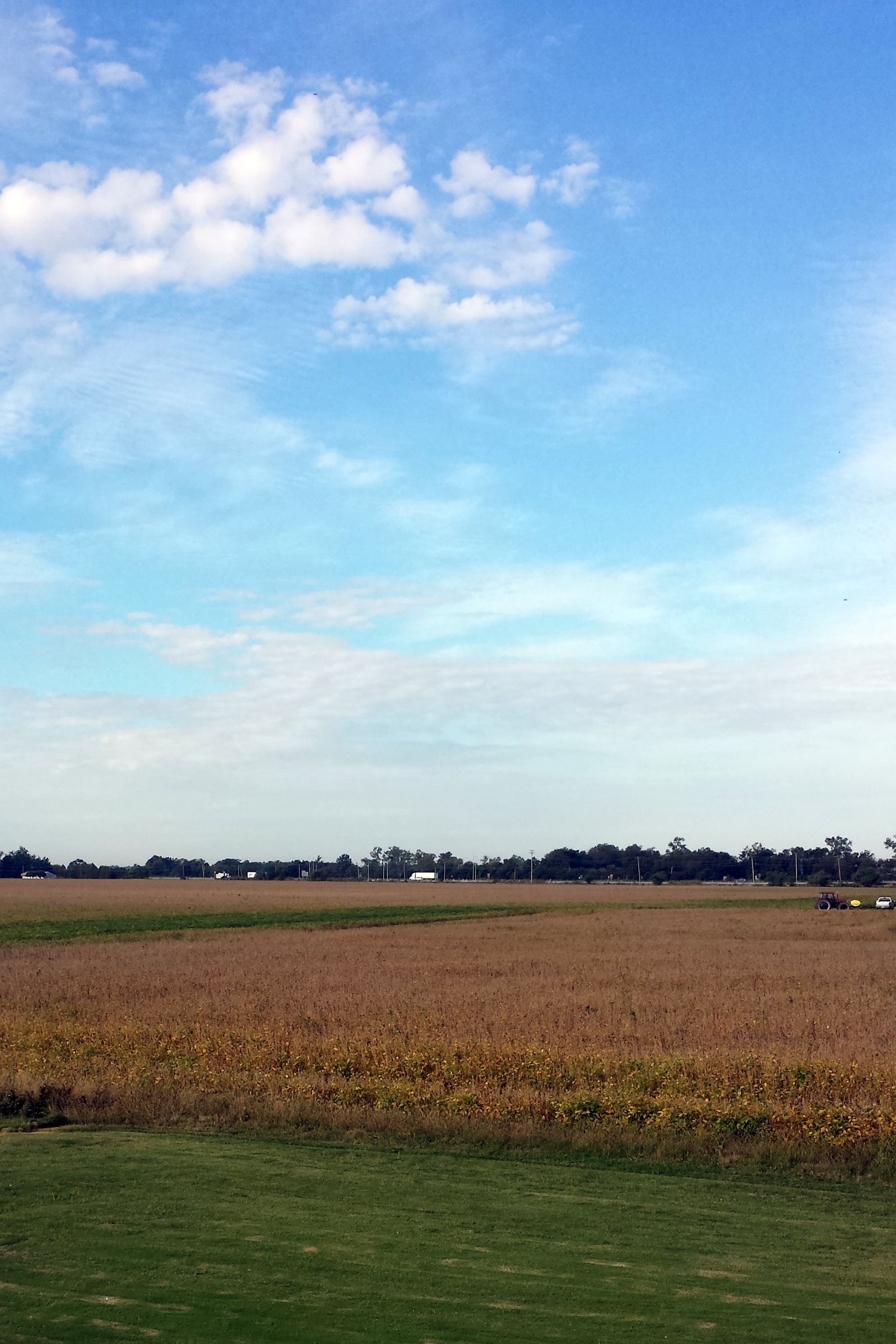
(2014) Ballpark in the background Osceola, Arkansas

== Timeline ==
Year(s)	# Yrs.	Team	Level	League	Affiliate	Ballpark
1936	1	Osceola Indians	Class D	Northeast Arkansas League	None	High School Ballpark
1937	1	Osceola Indians	Class D	Northeast Arkansas League	St. Louis Browns	High School Ballpark

== Year–by–year records ==
Year	Record	Place	Manager	Playoffs/notes
1936	58–37	2nd	Royce Williams	Did not qualify
1937	49–60	5th	Elmer Kirchoff	Did not qualify

== Notable alumni ==
- Otis Brannan (1936)
- Ox Miller (1937)
- Johnny Sain (1936–1937) 3x MLB All-Star; Braves Hall of Fame
- John Scolinos (1937)
- Osceola Indians players
