= Marianna Brickeys =

- 1909; Marianna, Arkansas

Minor league affiliations
- Class: Class D (1909)
- League: Northeast Arkansas League (1909)

Major league affiliations
- Team: None

Minor league titles
- League titles (0): None

Team data
- Name: Marianna Brickeys (1909)
- Ballpark: Unknown (1909)

The Marianna Brickeys were a minor league baseball team based in Marianna, Arkansas. In 1909, the Brickeys played as members of the Northeast Arkansas League, finishing in third place in their only season of minor league play.

== History ==
Minor league baseball began in Marianna, Arkansas when the "Marianna Brickeys" began play in 1909. Marianna became charter members of the reformed Class D level Northeast Arkansas League, which began play as a four–team league. The Northeast Arkansas League was formed after the Arkansas State League folded on July 27, 1909. With the Northeast Arkansas League beginning play on July 26, 1909, the Marianna Brickeys joined the Jonesboro Zebras, Newport Pearl Diggers and Paragould Scouts as charter members.

The Marianna use of the "Brickeys" nickname corresponds to the City of Marianna bricking the city streets in 1908.

In the final 1909 overall standings, Marianna placed third, playing the season under player/manager Jack McAdams. McAdams and Marianna teammate Wild Bill Luhrsen had played together earlier in the season for the Argenta Shamrocks of the Arkansas State League. In August, Luhrsen threw a shutout against the Paragould Scouts. The Marianna Brickeys ended the season with a 24–29 record in their first season of play, finishing 6½ games behind the first place Jonesboro Zebras (30–23). The Marianna Brickeys followed the second-place Newport Pearl Diggers (29–25) and finished ahead of the Paragould Scouts (24–30) in the final standings.

The Marianna franchise did not return to play in the 1910 Northeast Arkansas League. Marianna, Arkansas has not hosted another minor league team.

== The ballpark ==
The name and location of the Marianna Brickeys' home ballpark is unknown.

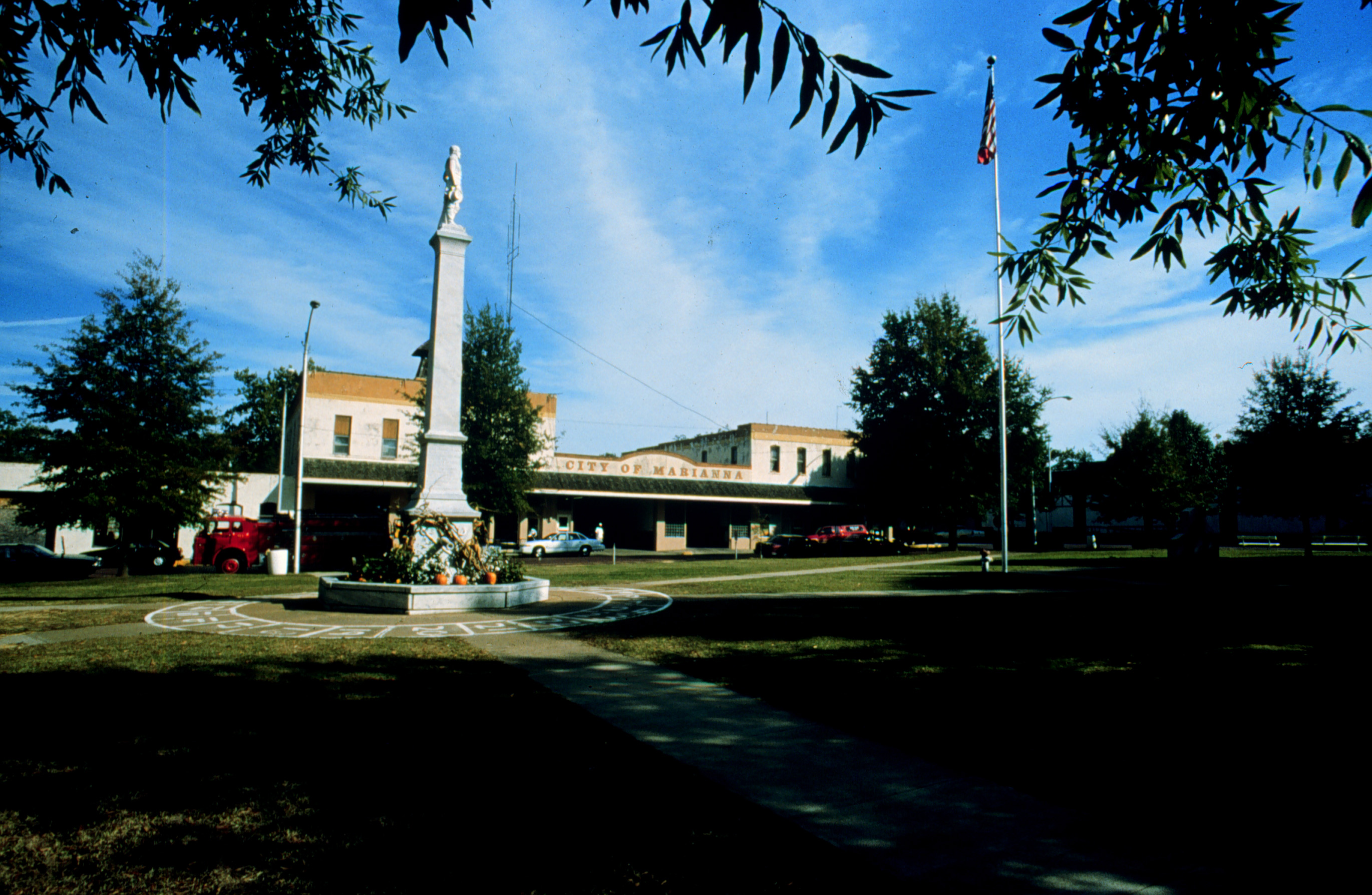
Marianna, Arkansas. Town Square

== Year–by–year record ==
| Year | Record | Place | Manager | Playoffs/notes |
|---|---|---|---|---|
| 1909 | 24–29 | 3rd | Jack McAdams | No playoffs held |

== Notable alumni ==
- Wild Bill Luhrsen (1909)
- Jack McAdams (1909, MGR)
- Marianna Brickeys players
