= West Plains Badgers =

- 1936; West Plains, Missouri

Minor league affiliations
- Class: Class D (1936)
- League: Northeast Arkansas League (1936)

Minor league titles
- League titles (1): 1936
- Wild card berths (1): 1936

Team data
- Name: West Plains Badgers (1936)
- Ballpark: American Legion Field (1936)

The West Plains Badgers were a minor league baseball team located in West Plains, Missouri. In 1936, the Badgers played briefly as members of the Class D level Northeast Arkansas League before the team relocated during the season to become the Caruthersville Pilots. The team won the 1936 Northeast Arkansas League championship.

The Badgers teams hosted home minor league games at American Legion Field in West Plains.

== History ==
Minor league baseball began in West Plains, when the 1936 West Plains "Badgers" became a franchise in the reformed six-team Class D level Northeast Arkansas League. West Plains was chosen as a franchise city in the reformed league after a meeting was held in Jonesboro, Arkansas in February 1936 to establish the league. The Batesville White Sox, Jonesboro Giants, Newport Cardinals, Osceola Indians and Paragould Rebels teams joined West Plains in beginning league play on May 7, 1936.

During the season, on June 11, 1936, the West Plains Badgers franchise moved to Caruthersville with an 18–10 record and became the Caruthersville Pilots. Playing in two cities, the West Plains/Caruthersville team won the 1936 league title, playing the season under the direction of manager Harrison Wickel in both locations. After compiling a 33–38 record while based in Caruthersville, the Pilots ended the regular season with an overall record of 51–48. The team placed fourth in the regular season standings, 17.0 games behind the first place Newport Cardinals and qualified for the playoffs. In the playoffs, the Pilots defeated the Jonesboro Giants 2 games to 1, playing for the first half title. In the Finals, the Pilots defeated the Newport Cardinals 3 games to 2 to claim the 1936 Northeast Arkansas League championship.

Caruthersville continued play in the 1937 Northeast Arkansas League. West Plains, Missouri has not hosted another minor league team.

== The ballpark ==
The West Plains Badgers played minor league home games at the American Legion Field. The ballpark was located at Bratton Avenue & N. Howell Avenue in West Plains.

== Year–by–year records ==
Year	Record	Finish	Manager	Playoffs/Notes
1936	51–48	1st	Harrison Wickel	West Plains (18–10) moved to Caruthersville June 16; League champions

== Notable alumni ==
- Tom Turner (1936)
- Harrison Wickel (1936, MGR)
- Caruthersville Pilots players
