= Hank Robinson =

American baseball player (1887–1965)

- Pitcher
- Born: August 16, 1887; Floyd, Arkansas, U.S.
- Died: July 3, 1965 (aged 77); North Little Rock, Arkansas, U.S.
- Batted: Right Threw: Left

MLB debut
- September 2, 1911, for the Pittsburgh Pirates

Last MLB appearance
- August 12, 1918, for the New York Yankees

MLB statistics
- Win–loss record: 42–37
- Earned run average: 2.53
- Strikeouts: 238
- Stats at Baseball Reference

Teams
- Pittsburgh Pirates (1911–1913); St. Louis Cardinals (1914–1915); New York Yankees (1918)

John Henry (Hank) Robinson (born John Henry Roberson; August 16, 1887 – July 3, 1965) was an American Major League Baseball pitcher who played from 1911 to 1915 and again in 1918 with three teams. He batted right and threw left-handed.

He was born in Floyd, Arkansas and died in North Little Rock, Arkansas. He was inducted into the Arkansas Sports Hall of Fame in 1962. Roberson is also known as John Henry Robinson and Rube Robinson.

== Early minor league career ==
Robinson was a successful semi-pro pitcher in Beebe, Arkansas, when he was recruited by the Argenta Shamrocks of the Arkansas State League in early July, 1908. He soon moved to the Newport Pearl Diggers in the same league, where he posted a 9-5 record. In 1909, Robinson pitched for the Jonesboro Zebras in the Arkansas State League until a trade to Waco of the Texas league in mid-season. Robinson did not report to Waco, but returned instead to his home in Floyd, Arkansas, and pitched on the local semi-pro team until Newport secured his rights in August. According to newspaper accounts his combined win total with Jonesboro and Newport was at least 21 victories. Robinson won 14 games in 1910 with the El Reno Packers in the Western Association before the team failed financially on July 30, 1910. He finished the year with Caruthersville, Missouri in the Northeast Arkansas League. Newspaper accounts credit him with at least 7 more wins at Caruthersville. Robinson had an outstanding minor league season in 1911 with the Fort Worth Panthers in the Texas League. He won 28 games for Fort Worth and despite pitching only one season in the league, he was named to the Texas League Hall of Fame in 2011.

== Major League career ==
Robinson's career major league record was 42-37. After a brief trial with the Pirates in late 1911, he enjoyed two successful seasons with Pittsburgh in 1912 and 1913. His combined record with the Pirates was 26 - 17. Robinson was traded to the St. Louis Cardinals in the winter of 1913 and pitched for the Cardinals in 1914 and 1915. Manager Miller Huggins tried to convert Robinson to a reliever during his time in St. Louis, but arm trouble limited Robinson's success. His record with the Cardinals was 14-16, over the two seasons. Robinson preferred to remain near his Arkansas home and throughout his career turned down major league opportunities to remain in Arkansas. He was optioned by the Cardinals to the Pacific Coast League in the winter of 1915, but refused to report. Reluctantly, the Cardinals optioned him to the Little Rock Travelers for the 1916 and 1917 seasons. He was 32 - 18 over those seasons. In 1918, Robinson was 8-2 for Little Rock when the Southern Association closed the season on June 30 due to the effects of World War I. Miller Huggins, Robinson's former manager and now manager of the Yankees, signed him to finish the season for New York. Robinson was 2-4 with the Yankees before leaving unexpectedly in mid-August. His last game with the Yankees would be his last in the major leagues. Ironically, the game on August 12, 1918, resulted in a 2 - 1 victory for Robinson over the Red Sox. The losing pitcher for Boston was Babe Ruth.

Although only a .170 hitter (37-for-218) in the majors, he fielded his position well, posting a .990 fielding percentage with only 2 errors in 210 total chances in 701 innings of work.

== Little Rock Travelers ==
Hank "Rube" Robinson pitched all or part of 13 consecutive season's with the Little Rock Travelers from 1916 to 1928. During his career he won 190 games and pitched over 3,000 innings for the Travelers. His best seasons were the 1920 season when he won 26 games for the league champion Travelers and 1922 when he matched the 26 win total. Robinson was traded to Atlanta in June 1928 and pitched parts of two seasons with the Atlanta Crackers. He was released in June 1929.

== Later years ==
In 1930 Robinson managed the Missouri Pacific Railroad semi-pro team to a national championship. He spent his later years as a volunteer in youth baseball and an employee of the Arkansas Highway Department. Robinson died in 1965 and is buried in North Little Rock, Arkansas, as John Henry Roberson.
