= Caruthersville Pilots =

- 1936–1940; (1910, 1936–1940); Caruthersville, Missouri

Minor league affiliations
- Class: Class D (1910, 1936–1940)
- League: Northeast Arkansas League (1910, 1936–1940)

Major league affiliations
- Team: St Louis Cardinals (1936–1940)

Minor league titles
- League titles (3): 1910; 1936; 1939
- Wild card berths (2): 1936; 1938

Team data
- Name: Caruthersville (1910); Caruthersville Pilots (1936–1940)
- Ballpark: American Legion Park (1936–1940)

The Caruthersville Pilots were a minor league baseball team located in Caruthersville, Missouri. The Pilots played as exclusively members of the Class D level Northeast Arkansas League from 1936 to 1940 after a Caruthersville team had played in the 1910 league. Caruthersville won league championships in 1910, 1936 and 1939. For their duration, the Caruthersville Pilots were a minor league affiliate of the St. Louis Cardinals and hosted home games at the American Legion Park.

== History ==
=== 1910: Northeast Arkansas League championship ===
Minor league baseball first came to Caruthersville, Missouri when the 1910 Caruthersville team became members of the Class D level Northeast Arkansas League. Playing in the four–team league under manager Al Ritter, Caruthersville finished with a 68–48 overall record, best in the league and won the first–half title in the league. The 1910 team was possibly called the "Alfalfas."

At the end of the 1910 season, the playoff series between Caruthersville and the Paragould Scouts was tied at 2–games each, when the final game was cancelled after a "riot" broke out during the game.

Despite winning the league championship the season before, Caruthersville did not return to the 1911 Northeast Arkansas League. They were replaced in the four-team league by the Helena Hustlers. Without Caruthersville as a member, the league folded on July 5, 1911, and did not return to play until 1936.

=== 1936 to 1940: Northeast Arkansas League ===
After a decades long hiatus, minor league baseball returned in 1936, when Caruthersville again became a franchise in the reformed Class D level Northeast Arkansas League during the season. On June 11, 1936, the West Plains Badgers franchise moved to Caruthersville with an 18–10 record and became the "Caruthersville Pilots." Caruthersville became an affiliate of the St. Louis Cardinals, a partnership that continued for the duration of the franchise. Playing in two cities, the West Plains/Caruthersville team won the 1936 league title, playing the season under the direction of manager Harrison Wickel. The Pilots ended the regular season with a 51–48 record, placing fourth in the standings. In the playoffs, the Pilots defeated the Jonesboro Giants 2 games to 1, playing for the first half title. In the Finals, the Pilots defeated the Newport Cardinals 3 games to 2 to claim the 1936 Northeast Arkansas League championship.

Continuing play in the 1937 Northeast Arkansas League, Caruthersville finished in second place overall. The Pilots finished the season with a 59–47 record under returning manager Harrison Wickel. Caruthersville finished behind the first place Blytheville Giants, who won both halves of the season standings, so no playoffs were held.

In 1938, Caruthersville finished in second place in the Northeast Arkansas League standings with a 62–42 record. The Pilots' managers were Wilson Koewing, Al Iezzi and Joseph Simmons. In the 1938 playoffs, the Newport Cardinals defeated the Caruthersville Pilots 2 games to 1.

The 1939 Caruthersville Pilots won the Northeast Arkansas League championship in their last full season of league play. With a regular season of 79–39, the Pilots placed first in the standings under returning manager Joseph Simmons, winning both half–season titles, so no playoff was held.

The Caruthersville Pilots played their final season in 1940, relocating during the season. In a partial season, the Caruthersville franchise moved to become the Batesville Pilots on July 10, 1940, with a 31–32 record at the time of the move. The team finished the season with an overall record of 47–73, placing last in the four–team Northeast Arkansas League under manager Ernie Stefani.

Caruthersville, Missouri has not hosted another minor league team.

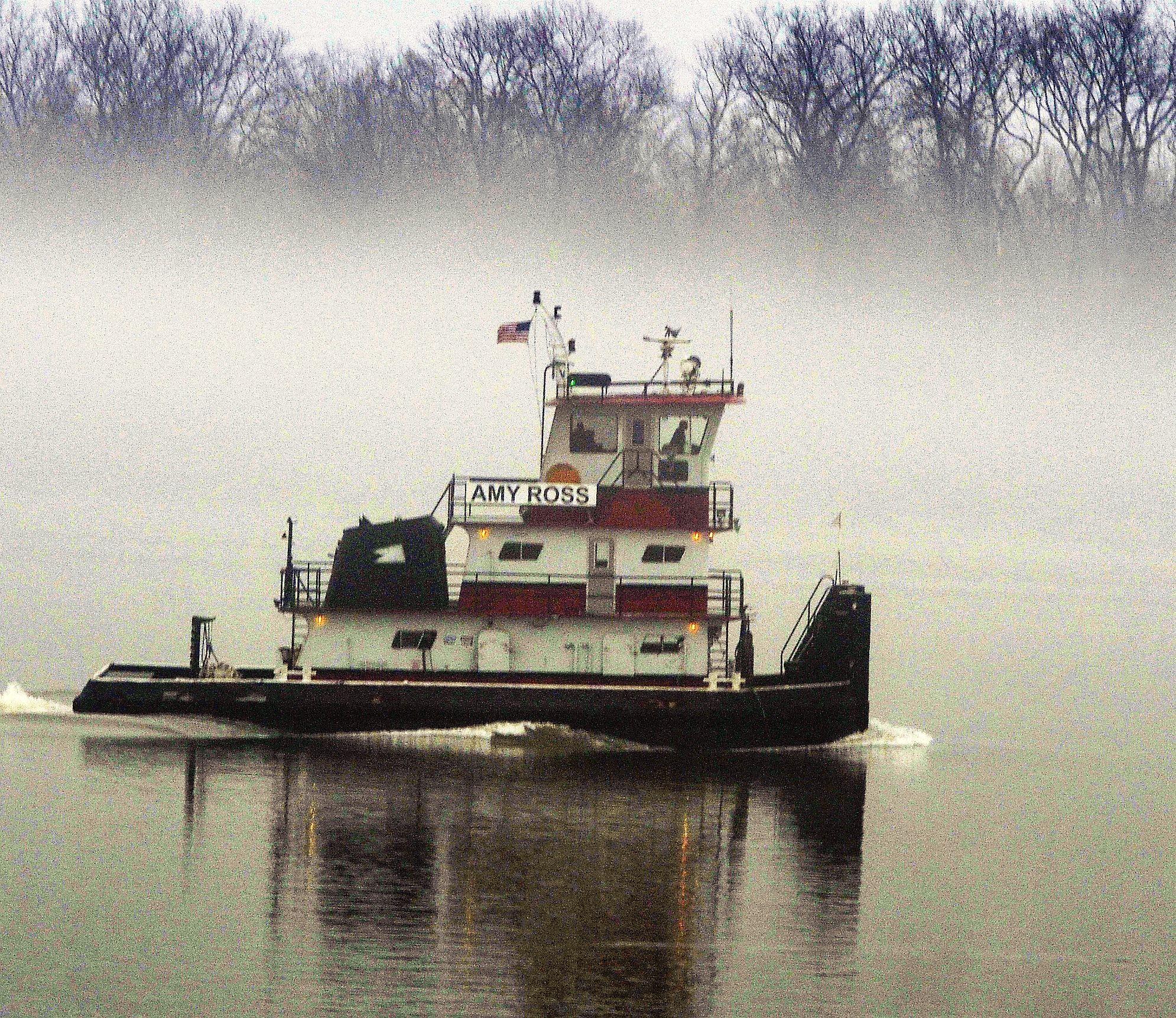
(2014) Tugboat, Caruthersville, Missouri. Mississippi River

== The ballpark ==
Beginning in 1936, the Caruthersville Pilots teams hosted minor league home games at the American Legion Park. The field had dimensions of (left–center–right) 357–351–337 in 1939 and 350–351–350 in 1940.

== Timeline ==
Year(s)	# Yrs.	Team	Level	League	Affiliate	Ballpark
1910	1	Caruthersville	Class D	Northeast Arkansas League	None	Unknown
1936–1940	5	Caruthersville Pilots	Class D	Northeast Arkansas League	St. Louis Cardinals	American Legion Park

== Year–by–year records ==
Year	Record	Finish	Manager	Playoffs/Notes
1910	68–48	1st	Al Ritter	League champions
1936	51–48	1st	Harrison Wickel	West Plains (18–10) moved June 16; League champions
1937	59–47	2nd	Harrison Wickel	No playoffs held
1938	62–42	2nd	Wilson Koewing; Al Iezzi / Joseph Simmons	Did not qualify
1939	79–39	1st	Joseph Simmons	League champions
1940	47–73	4th	Ernie Stefani	Moved to Blythedale (31–32) July 10

== Notable alumni ==
- Fats Dantonio (1939)
- Whitey Kurowski (1937)
- Hank Robinson (1910)
- Tom Turner (1936–1937)
- Harrison Wickel (1936–1937, MGR)

== See also ==
- Caruthersville Pilots players
- Caruthersville (minor league baseball) players
