= Corinth Corinthians =

- 1925–1926; Corinth, Mississippi

Minor league affiliations
- Class: Class D (1925–1926)
- League: Tri-State League (1925–1926)

Major league affiliations
- Team: None

Minor league titles
- League titles (1): 1926

Team data
- Name: Corinth Corinthians (1925–1926)
- Ballpark: Corinth City Park (1925–1926)

The Corinth Corinthians were a minor league baseball team based in Corinth, Mississippi. In 1925 and 1926, Corinth played exclusively as members of the Class D level Tri-State League, winning the 1926 league championship. The Corinthians hosted minor league home games at Corinth City Park.

== History ==
The 1925 Corinth "Corinthians" began minor league baseball play in Corinth, Mississippi, when the franchise became charter members of the newly formed six–team Class D level Tri-State League.

Corinth ended their first season of play in the Tri-State League regular season with a 57–49 record, placing fourth in the league standings, playing the season under manager M.R. Striplin. The Corinthians ended the season 10.0 games behind the first place Tupelo Wolves (67–39). The remaining standings in the TriState League's first season of play consisted of the second place Jonesboro Buffaloes (63–43), followed by the Dyersburg Deers (59–46), Corinth (57–49), Jackson Giants (40–63) and Blytheville Tigers (31–77). Corinth pitcher John Bates led the Tri-State League with 16 wins and 129 strikeouts.

The 1926 Tri-State League folded before the conclusion of the season with the Corinth Corinthians in a tie for first place. When the league folded on July 6, 1926, following an owners' meeting, the Corinth Corinthians had the same 35–23 record as the Jonesboro Buffalos. Corinth was managed in 1926 by Roy Clunk. Corinth pitcher John Bates returned to lead the Tri-State League with 11 wins, 71 strikeouts and an 11–2 record.

When the Tri-State League owners met in Memphis, Tennessee and voted to suspend the league play in 1926, it was agreed to have the Jonesboro Buffaloes meet the Corinthians in the championship series, with the league planning on returning to play in 1927. However, before the series was played, Jonesboro accused Corinth of signing new players to improve their roster before the series. The accusation was verified, and Tri-State League president John D. Martin canceled the series.

The Tri-State League did not return to play in 1927. Corinth has not hosted another minor league team.

== The ballpark ==
The Corinth Corinthians were noted to have played their minor league home games at Corinth City Park. The ballpark was located at South Parkway Street & Tate Street in Corinth, Mississippi. Today, the park is still in use as a public park, renamed to Crossroads Regional Park.

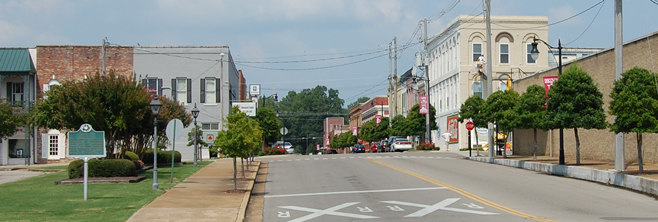
(2010) Downtown. Corinth, Mississippi

== Timeline ==
Year(s)	# Yrs.	Team	Level	League	Ballpark
1925–1926	2	Corinth Corinthians	Class D	Tri-State League	Corinth City Park

== Year–by–year records ==
Year	Record	Finish	Manager	Playoffs
1925	57–49	4th	M. R. Striplin	No playoffs held
1926	55–23	1st (Tie)	Roy Clunk	League folded July 6

<

== Notable alumni ==
- Goldie Holt (1925)
- Bill Lewis (1925)
- Corinth Corinthians players
