= Tupelo Wolves =

- 1925–1926; Tupelo, Mississippi

Minor league affiliations
- Class: Class D (1925–1926)
- League: Tri-State League (1925–1926)

Major league affiliations
- Team: None

Minor league titles
- League titles (0): None
- Conference titles (1): 1925

Team data
- Name: Tupelo Wolves (1925–1926)
- Ballpark: Unknown (1925–1926)

The Tupelo Wolves were a minor league baseball team, based in Tupelo, Mississippi. In 1925 and 1926, the Wolves played exclusively as members of the six–team, Class D level Tri-State League, winning the league pennant in 1925.

== History ==
Minor league baseball began in Tupelo, Mississippi began with the 1925 Tupelo "Wolves." Playing as members of the newly formed six-team Class D level Tri-State League, the Wolves won the league pennant in 1925. The Blytheville Tigers, Corinth Corinthians, Dyersburg Deers, Jackson Giants and Jonesboro Buffaloes teams joined Tupelo in beginning league play on May 7, 1925.

In their first season of play Tupelo ended the six–team Tri-State League regular season with a 60–39 record to place first in the regular season standings. Playing the season under manager Howard "Red" Reese, the Wolves finished 4.0 games ahead of the second place Jonesboro Buffaloes (63–43). They were followed by the Dyersburg Deers (59–46), Corinth Corinthians (57–49), Jackson Giants (40–63) and Blytheville Tigers (31–77) in the standings. In the 1925 playoffs, the Tupelo Wolves lost in the Finals to the Jonesboro Buffaloes 4 games to 2.

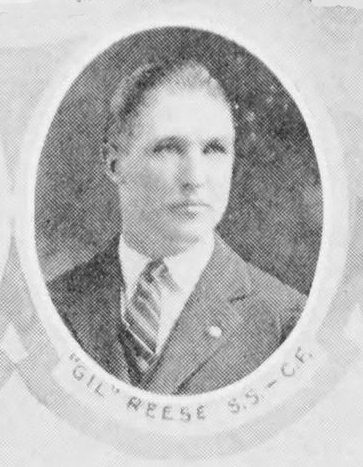
Andy Reese. 1925 Vanderbilt yearbook. Reese played for the Tupelo Wolves under the pseudonym Tidbit Bynun in a failed attempt to protect his collegiate athletic eligibility.

The 1925 Wolves were led by Tupelo native Andy Reese, who led the Tri-State League both with 102 runs scored and 144 total hits. As a multi–sport athlete at Vanderbilt University, Reese allegedly began to play for the Wolves under the pseudonym Tidbit Bynum in order to protect his collegiate eligibility. However, Vanderbilt became aware of his professional play, ending his college athletic career. Reese then continued in his professional baseball career under his real name.

The Tri-State League folded before the conclusion of the 1926 season with Tupelo in last place. On July 6, 1926, the Tupelo Wolves had a 22–36 record and were in sixth place, 13.0 games behind the first place Jonesboro Buffalos and Corinth Corinthians, when the league folded. Tupelo was managed in 1926 by Omar Pressley and had an average roster age of 21.0, as Jonesboro was at 23.9. The Tri-State League did not return to play in 1927.

Tupelo was without minor league baseball until 1997, when the Tupelo "Tornado" team played the season as members of the four–team Independent level Big South League. Tupelo won the league championship with a 40–19 record.

== The ballpark ==
The name of the Tupelo Wolves' home ballpark in 1925 and 1926 is unknown. Ballard Park in Tupelo was noted to have been in use in the era as a public park.

== Timeline ==
Year(s)	# Yrs.	Team	Level	League
1925–1926	2	Tupelo Wolves	Class D	Tri-State League

== Year–by–year records ==
Year	Record	Finish	Manager	Playoffs
1925	60–39	1st	Red Reese	Won league pennant Lost in finals
1926	22–36	6th	Omar Pressley	League folded July 6

== Notable alumni ==
- Hod Lisenbee (1925)
- Andy Reese (1925)
- Tupelo Wolves players
