= List of Baltimore Orioles minor league affiliates =

Locations of Baltimore Orioles' current top four minor league affiliates.

The Baltimore Orioles farm system consists of seven Minor League Baseball affiliates in the United States and the Dominican Republic. Four teams are independently owned, while the other three—the Florida Complex League Orioles and two Dominican Summer League Orioles squads—are owned by the major league club.

The Orioles have been affiliated with the Double-A Chesapeake Baysox of the Eastern League since 1993, making it the longest-running active affiliation in the organization among teams not owned by the Orioles. Their newest affiliate is the Frederick Keys of the South Atlantic League, which will become the Orioles' High-A club in 2026. The longest affiliation in team history was the 53-year relationship with the Rookie Appalachian League's Bluefield Orioles from 1958 to 2010.

The Orioles have the shortest cumulative distance between its four full-season minor league affiliates in baseball at 487 miles (784 km). The top four affiliates are located within a 200-mile (320 km) radius from Baltimore, with three of them situated in Maryland. Geographically, Baltimore's closest domestic affiliate is the Baysox of the Double-A Eastern League, which is approximately 24 miles (39 km) away. Baltimore's furthest domestic affiliate is the Florida Complex League Orioles of the Rookie Florida Complex League some 892 miles (1,436 km) away.

== Current affiliates ==
The Baltimore Orioles farm system consists of seven minor league affiliates.

Class	Team	League	Location	Ballpark	Affiliated
Triple-A	Norfolk Tides	International League	Norfolk, Virginia	Harbor Park	2007
Double-A	Chesapeake Baysox	Eastern League	Bowie, Maryland	Prince George's Stadium	1993
High-A	Frederick Keys	South Atlantic League	Frederick, Maryland	Nymeo Field at Harry Grove Stadium	2026
Single-A	Delmarva Shorebirds	Carolina League	Salisbury, Maryland	Arthur W. Perdue Stadium	1997
Rookie	FCL Orioles	Florida Complex League	Sarasota, Florida	Ed Smith Stadium	2007
Rookie	DSL Orioles Black	Dominican Summer League	San Antonio de Guerra, Santo Domingo	Baltimore Orioles Dominican Academy	1996
Rookie	DSL Orioles Orange	Dominican Summer League	San Antonio de Guerra, Santo Domingo	Baltimore Orioles Dominican Academy	1996

== Past affiliates ==
=== 2021–present ===
The current structure of Minor League Baseball is the result of an overall contraction of the system beginning with the 2021 season. Class A was reduced to two levels: High-A and Low-A. Class A Short Season teams and domestic Rookie League teams that operated away from Spring Training facilities were eliminated. Low-A was reclassified as Single-A in 2022.

Year	Triple-A	Double-A	High-A	Single-A	Rookie League	Foreign Rookie
2026	Norfolk Tides	Chesapeake Baysox	Frederick Keys	Delmarva Shorebirds	FCL Orioles	DSL Orioles Black; DSL Orioles Orange
2025	Norfolk Tides	Chesapeake Baysox	Aberdeen IronBirds	Delmarva Shorebirds	FCL Orioles	DSL Orioles Black; DSL Orioles Orange
2024	Norfolk Tides	Bowie Baysox	Aberdeen IronBirds	Delmarva Shorebirds	FCL Orioles	DSL Orioles Black; DSL Orioles Orange
2023	Norfolk Tides	Bowie Baysox	Aberdeen IronBirds	Delmarva Shorebirds	FCL Orioles	DSL Orioles Black; DSL Orioles Orange
2022	Norfolk Tides	Bowie Baysox	Aberdeen IronBirds	Delmarva Shorebirds	FCL Orioles	DSL Orioles Black; DSL Orioles Orange
2021	Norfolk Tides	Bowie Baysox	Aberdeen IronBirds	Delmarva Shorebirds	FCL Orioles	DSL Orioles Black; DSL Orioles Orange

=== 1990–2020 ===
Minor League Baseball operated with six classes from 1990 to 2020. The Class A level was subdivided for a second time with the creation of Class A-Advanced. The Rookie level consisted of domestic and foreign circuits.

Year	Triple-A	Double-A	Class A-Advanced	Class A	Class A Short Season	Rookie League	Foreign Rookie
2020	Norfolk Tides	Bowie Baysox	Frederick Keys	Delmarva Shorebirds	Aberdeen IronBirds	GCL Orioles	DSL Orioles 1 DSL Orioles 2
2019	Norfolk Tides	Bowie Baysox	Frederick Keys	Delmarva Shorebirds	Aberdeen IronBirds	GCL Orioles	DSL Orioles 1 DSL Orioles 2
2018	Norfolk Tides	Bowie Baysox	Frederick Keys	Delmarva Shorebirds	Aberdeen IronBirds	GCL Orioles	DSL Orioles
2017	Norfolk Tides	Bowie Baysox	Frederick Keys	Delmarva Shorebirds	Aberdeen IronBirds	GCL Orioles	DSL Orioles
2016	Norfolk Tides	Bowie Baysox	Frederick Keys	Delmarva Shorebirds	Aberdeen IronBirds	GCL Orioles	DSL Orioles 1 DSL Orioles 2
2015	Norfolk Tides	Bowie Baysox	Frederick Keys	Delmarva Shorebirds	Aberdeen IronBirds	GCL Orioles	DSL Orioles 1 DSL Orioles 2
2014	Norfolk Tides	Bowie Baysox	Frederick Keys	Delmarva Shorebirds	Aberdeen IronBirds	GCL Orioles	DSL Orioles 1 DSL Orioles 2
2013	Norfolk Tides	Bowie Baysox	Frederick Keys	Delmarva Shorebirds	Aberdeen IronBirds	GCL Orioles	DSL Orioles 1 DSL Orioles 2
2012	Norfolk Tides	Bowie Baysox	Frederick Keys	Delmarva Shorebirds	Aberdeen IronBirds	GCL Orioles	DSL Orioles
2011	Norfolk Tides	Bowie Baysox	Frederick Keys	Delmarva Shorebirds	Aberdeen IronBirds	GCL Orioles	DSL Orioles
2010	Norfolk Tides	Bowie Baysox	Frederick Keys	Delmarva Shorebirds	Aberdeen IronBirds	Bluefield Orioles; GCL Orioles	DSL Orioles 1 DSL Orioles 2
2009	Norfolk Tides	Bowie Baysox	Frederick Keys	Delmarva Shorebirds	Aberdeen IronBirds	Bluefield Orioles; GCL Orioles	DSL Orioles
2008	Norfolk Tides	Bowie Baysox	Frederick Keys	Delmarva Shorebirds	Aberdeen IronBirds	Bluefield Orioles; GCL Orioles	DSL Orioles
2007	Norfolk Tides	Bowie Baysox	Frederick Keys	Delmarva Shorebirds	Aberdeen IronBirds	Bluefield Orioles; GCL Orioles	DSL Orioles
2006	Ottawa Lynx	Bowie Baysox	Frederick Keys	Delmarva Shorebirds	Aberdeen IronBirds	Bluefield Orioles	DSL Orioles; VSL Orioles
2005	Ottawa Lynx	Bowie Baysox	Frederick Keys	Delmarva Shorebirds	Aberdeen IronBirds	Bluefield Orioles	DSL Orioles; VSL Orioles
2004	Ottawa Lynx	Bowie Baysox	Frederick Keys	Delmarva Shorebirds	Aberdeen IronBirds	Bluefield Orioles	DSL Orioles; Venoco 2
2003	Ottawa Lynx	Bowie Baysox	Frederick Keys	Delmarva Shorebirds	Aberdeen IronBirds	Bluefield Orioles; GCL Orioles	DSL Orioles; Yaritagua
2002	Rochester Red Wings	Bowie Baysox	Frederick Keys	Delmarva Shorebirds	Aberdeen IronBirds	Bluefield Orioles; GCL Orioles	DSL Orioles; Cabudare
2001	Rochester Red Wings	Bowie Baysox	Frederick Keys	Delmarva Shorebirds	—	Bluefield Orioles; GCL Orioles	DSL Orioles
2000	Rochester Red Wings	Bowie Baysox	Frederick Keys	Delmarva Shorebirds	—	Bluefield Orioles; GCL Orioles	DSL Orioles
1999	Rochester Red Wings	Bowie Baysox	Frederick Keys	Delmarva Shorebirds	—	Bluefield Orioles; GCL Orioles	DSL Orioles
1998	Rochester Red Wings	Bowie Baysox	Frederick Keys	Delmarva Shorebirds	—	Bluefield Orioles; GCL Orioles	DSL Orioles
1997	Rochester Red Wings	Bowie Baysox	Frederick Keys	Delmarva Shorebirds	—	Bluefield Orioles; GCL Orioles	DSL Orioles
1996	Rochester Red Wings	Bowie Baysox	Frederick Keys; High Desert Mavericks	—	—	Bluefield Orioles; GCL Orioles	DSL Orioles
1995	Rochester Red Wings	Bowie Baysox	Frederick Keys; High Desert Mavericks	—	—	Bluefield Orioles; GCL Orioles	—
1994	Rochester Red Wings	Bowie Baysox	Frederick Keys	Albany Polecats	—	Bluefield Orioles; GCL Orioles	—
1993	Rochester Red Wings	Bowie Baysox	Frederick Keys	Albany Polecats	—	Bluefield Orioles; GCL Orioles	—
1992	Rochester Red Wings	Hagerstown Suns	Frederick Keys	Kane County Cougars	—	Bluefield Orioles; GCL Orioles	—
1991	Rochester Red Wings	Hagerstown Suns	Frederick Keys	Kane County Cougars	—	Bluefield Orioles; GCL Orioles	—
1990	Rochester Red Wings	Hagerstown Suns	Frederick Keys	Wausau Timbers	—	Bluefield Orioles	—

=== 1963–1989 ===
The foundation of the minors' current structure was the result of a reorganization initiated by Major League Baseball (MLB) before the 1963 season. The reduction from six classes to four (Triple-A, Double-AA, Class A and Rookie) was a response to the general decline of the minors throughout the 1950s and early-1960s when leagues and teams folded due to shrinking attendance caused by baseball fans' preference for staying at home to watch MLB games on television. The only change made within the next 27 years was Class A being subdivided for the first time to form Class A Short Season in 1966.

(The Orioles were involved in minor league affiliate co-op agreements twice—the Pulaski Phillies with various other MLB clubs in 1976 and the Daytona Beach Islanders with the Texas Rangers in 1985.)

Year	Triple-A	Double-A	Class A	Class A Short Season	Rookie League
1989	Rochester Red Wings	Hagerstown Suns	Frederick Keys	Erie Orioles	Bluefield Orioles
1988	Rochester Red Wings	Charlotte Knights	Hagerstown Suns	Erie Orioles	Bluefield Orioles
1987	Rochester Red Wings	Charlotte Orioles	Hagerstown Suns	Newark Orioles	Bluefield Orioles
1986	Rochester Red Wings	Charlotte Orioles	Hagerstown Suns	Newark Orioles	Bluefield Orioles
1985	Rochester Red Wings	Charlotte Orioles	Hagerstown Suns, Daytona Beach Islanders	Newark Orioles	Bluefield Orioles
1984	Rochester Red Wings	Charlotte Orioles	Hagerstown Suns	Newark Orioles	Bluefield Orioles
1983	Rochester Red Wings	Charlotte Orioles	Hagerstown Suns, San Jose Bees	Newark Orioles	Bluefield Orioles
1982	Rochester Red Wings	Charlotte Orioles	Hagerstown Suns	—	Bluefield Orioles
1981	Rochester Red Wings	Charlotte Orioles	Miami Orioles	—	Bluefield Orioles
1980	Rochester Red Wings	Charlotte Orioles	Miami Orioles	—	Bluefield Orioles
1979	Rochester Red Wings	Charlotte Orioles	Miami Orioles	—	Bluefield Orioles
1978	Rochester Red Wings	Charlotte Orioles	Miami Orioles	—	Bluefield Orioles
1977	Rochester Red Wings	Charlotte Orioles	Miami Orioles	—	Bluefield Orioles
1976	Rochester Red Wings	Charlotte Orioles	Miami Orioles	—	Bluefield Orioles; Pulaski Phillies
1975	Rochester Red Wings	Asheville Orioles	Miami Orioles, Lodi Orioles	—	Bluefield Orioles
1974	Rochester Red Wings	Asheville Orioles	Miami Orioles, Lodi Orioles	—	Bluefield Orioles
1973	Rochester Red Wings	Asheville Orioles	Miami Orioles, Lodi Lions	—	Bluefield Orioles
1972	Rochester Red Wings	Asheville Orioles	Miami Orioles, Lodi Orions	Lewiston Broncs	Bluefield Orioles
1971	Rochester Red Wings	Dallas-Fort Worth Spurs	Miami Orioles, Stockton Ports	Aberdeen Pheasants	Bluefield Orioles
1970	Rochester Red Wings	Dallas-Fort Worth Spurs	Miami Marlins, Stockton Ports	Aberdeen Pheasants	Bluefield Orioles
1969	Rochester Red Wings	Dallas-Fort Worth Spurs	Miami Marlins, Stockton Ports	Aberdeen Pheasants	Bluefield Orioles
1968	Rochester Red Wings	Elmira Pioneers	Miami Marlins, Stockton Ports	Aberdeen Pheasants	Bluefield Orioles
1967	Rochester Red Wings	Elmira Pioneers	Miami Marlins, Stockton Ports	Aberdeen Pheasants	Bluefield Orioles
1966	Rochester Red Wings	Elmira Pioneers	Miami Marlins, Stockton Ports	Aberdeen Pheasants	Bluefield Orioles
1965	Rochester Red Wings	Elmira Pioneers	Tri-City Atoms, Stockton Ports, Fox Cities Foxes, Aberdeen Pheasants	—	Bluefield Orioles
1964	Rochester Red Wings	Elmira Pioneers	Stockton Ports, Fox Cities Foxes, Aberdeen Pheasants	—	Bluefield Orioles
1963	Rochester Red Wings	Elmira Pioneers	Stockton Ports, Fox Cities Foxes, Aberdeen Pheasants	—	Bluefield Orioles

=== 1954–1962 ===
The minors operated with six levels (Triple-A, Double-A and Classes A, B, C and D) from 1946 to 1962. The Pacific Coast League (PCL) was reclassified from Triple-A to Open in 1952 due to the possibility of becoming a third major league. This arrangement ended following the 1957 season when the relocation of the National League's Dodgers and Giants to the West Coast killed any chance of the PCL being promoted. The 1963 reorganization resulted in the Eastern and South Atlantic Leagues being elevated from Class A to Double-A, five of seven Class D circuits plus the ones in B and C upgraded to A, and the Appalachian League reclassified from D to Rookie.

Year	Triple-A	Double-A	Class A	Class B	Class C	Class D
1962	Rochester Red Wings	—	Elmira Pioneers	—	Stockton Ports; Aberdeen Pheasants	Bluefield Orioles; Fox Cities Foxes
1961	Rochester Red Wings	Little Rock Travelers; Victoria/Ardmore Rosebuds	—	Fox Cities Foxes; Tri-Cities Braves	Stockton Ports; Aberdeen Pheasants	Bluefield Orioles; Leesburg Orioles
1960	Vancouver Mounties; Miami Marlins	—	—	Fox Cities Foxes	Stockton Ports; Aberdeen Pheasants	Bluefield Orioles; Leesburg Orioles
1959	Vancouver Mounties; Miami Marlins	Amarillo Gold Sox	—	—	Stockton Ports; Aberdeen Pheasants	Bluefield Orioles; Pensacola Dons
1958	Vancouver Mounties; Louisville Colonels	—	Knoxville Smokies	Wilson Tobs	Aberdeen Pheasants	Bluefield Orioles; Pensacola Dons; Fitzgerald Orioles
1957	Vancouver Mounties (Open)	San Antonio Missions	Knoxville Smokies	—	Aberdeen Pheasants; Phoenix Stars	Paris Orioles; Thomson Orioles; Fitzgerald Orioles
1956	Vancouver Mounties (Open)	San Antonio Missions	Columbus Foxes	York White Roses; Lubbock Hubbers/ Texas City Texans	Aberdeen Pheasants; Thetford Mines Miners; Phoenix Stars	Paris Orioles; Thomson Orioles
1955	—	San Antonio Missions	Wichita Indians	York White Roses; Fayetteville Highlanders	Aberdeen Pheasants; Thetford Mines Miners	Paris Orioles; Cordele Orioles
1954	—	San Antonio Missions	Wichita Indians; Lewiston Broncs	York White Roses; Anderson Rebels	Aberdeen Pheasants; Thetford Mines Miners; Pine Bluff Judges	Americus-Cordele Orioles; Wytheville Statesmen; Marion Marauders; Ada Herefords/Cementers

== St. Louis Browns ==
Year	Triple-A	Double-A	Class A	Class B	Class C	Class D
1953	—	San Antonio Missions	Wichita Indians; Lewiston Broncs	York White Roses; Anderson Rebels	Aberdeen Pheasants; Pine Bluff Judges; Thetford Mines Miners; Pocatello Bannocks	Ada Herefords; Wytheville Statesmen; Valdosta Browns
1952	Toronto Maple Leafs	San Antonio Missions	Scranton Miners	York White Roses; Anderson Rebels	Aberdeen Pheasants; Stockton Ports; Pine Bluff Judges; Pocatello Bannocks	Ada Herefords; Independence Browns; Wellsville Rockets
1951	Toronto Maple Leafs	San Antonio Missions	—	Anderson Rebels	Aberdeen Pheasants; Pine Bluff Judges	Ada Herefords; Pittsburg Browns; Redding Browns; Appleton Papermakers
1950	Baltimore Orioles	San Antonio Missions	Wichita Indians	Wichita Falls Spudders	Aberdeen Pheasants; Pine Bluff Judges; Marshall Browns	Ada Herefords; Pittsburg Browns; Redding Browns; Appleton Papermakers
1949	Baltimore Orioles	San Antonio Missions	Elmira Pioneers	Springfield Browns; Wichita Falls Spudders	Aberdeen Pheasants; Pine Bluff Cardinals; Gloversville-Johnstown Glovers; Globe-Miami Browns; Muskogee Reds; Marshall Browns; Salinas Colts/Potros de Tijuana	Mayfield Clothiers; Ada Herefords; Pittsburg Browns; Redding Browns; Wausau Lumberjacks; Olean Oilers
1948	Toledo Mud Hens	San Antonio Missions	Elmira Pioneers	Springfield Browns; Wichita Falls Spudders; Port Chester Clippers	Aberdeen Pheasants; Gloversville-Johnstown Glovers; Globe-Miami Browns; Muskogee Reds; Hannibal Pilots; Modesto Reds	Mayfield Clothiers; Ada Herefords; Pittsburg Browns; Redding Browns; Wausau Lumberjacks; Belleville Stags; Griffin Pimientos; Peekskill Highlanders
1947	Toledo Mud Hens	San Antonio Missions	Elmira Pioneers	Springfield Browns	Aberdeen Pheasants; Gloversville-Johnstown Glovers; Globe-Miami Browns; Muskogee Reds; Hannibal Pilots	Mayfield Clothiers; Ada Herefords; Pittsburg Browns; Newark Moundsmen; Wausau Lumberjacks; Belleville Stags; Baton Rouge Red Sticks
1946	Toledo Mud Hens	San Antonio Missions	Elmira Pioneers	Springfield Browns; Spartanburg Peaches	Aberdeen Pheasants; Gloversville-Johnstown Glovers; Paris Red Peppers	Mayfield Clothiers; Pittsburg Browns; Newark Moundsmen
1945	—	Toledo Mud Hens	Elmira Pioneers	—	—	Newark Moundsmen
1944	—	Toledo Mud Hens	Memphis Chickasaws	—	—	Newark Moundsmen
1943	—	Toledo Mud Hens	—	—	—	—
1942	—	Toledo Mud Hens	San Antonio Missions	Springfield Browns	Gloversville-Johnstown Glovers; Huntington Jewels	Dothan Browns
1941	—	Toledo Mud Hens	San Antonio Missions	Springfield Browns; Meridian Eagles	Youngstown Browns; St. Joseph Ponies/Carthage Browns	Mayfield Browns; Lafayette White Sox; Paragould Browns; Pueblo Rollers
1940	—	Toledo Mud Hens	San Antonio Missions	Springfield Browns	Palestine Pals; Youngstown Browns; Topeka Owls; Tyler Trojans	Mayfield Browns; Lafayette White Sox; Paragould Browns; Pennington Gap Miners
1939	—	—	San Antonio Missions	Springfield Browns	Youngstown Browns; Topeka Owls	Mayfield Browns; Lafayette White Sox; Paragould Browns; Pennington Gap Miners; Lincoln Links; Beaver Falls Bees; Fayetteville Angels
1938	—	—	San Antonio Missions	Springfield Browns; Meridian Scrappers	Palestine Pals; Johnstown Johnnies	Mayfield Clothiers; Lafayette White Sox; Findlay Browns; Easton Cubs; Lincoln Links; Batesville White Sox
1937	—	—	San Antonio Missions; Des Moines Demons	Meridian Scrappers; Terre Haute Tots	Palestine Pals; Johnstown Johnnies	Mayfield Clothiers; Lafayette White Sox; Findlay Browns; Easton Browns; Fairbury Jeffs; Osceola Indians; Superior Blues
1936	—	—	San Antonio Missions	—	Palestine Pals	Lafayette White Sox
1935	—	—	San Antonio Missions	—	Palestine Pals	—
1934	—	—	San Antonio Missions	—	—	—
1933	—	—	San Antonio Missions; Joplin Miners	—	—	—
1932	—	—	Wichita Falls Spudders/ Longview Cannibals	—	Fort Smith Twins/ Muskogee Chiefs	Rock Island Islanders
1931	—	—	Wichita Falls Spudders	—	—	—
1930	—	—	Wichita Falls Spudders	—	—	—
1929	—	—	Wichita Falls Spudders	—	—	—
1928	—	—	Wichita Falls Spudders	—	—	—
