= Batesville Pilots =

- 1936–1941; Batesville, Arkansas

Minor league affiliations
- Previous classes: Class D
- League: Northeast Arkansas League

Major league affiliations
- Previous teams: St. Louis Cardinals

Minor league titles
- League titles: 1936, 1939

Team data
- Previous names: Batesville Pilots (1940-1941); Caruthersville Pilots (1936-1940); West Plains Badgers (1936)

This team began as the West Plains Badgers, based in West Plains, Missouri in 1936. They were an affiliate of the St. Louis Cardinals in the Northeast Arkansas League.

The team moved to Caruthersville, Missouri on June 11, 1936, and became the Caruthersville Pilots. Despite playing in two cities under two names, they won the 1936 league title under manager Harrison Wickel. They won another championship in 1939 under manager Joseph Simmons.

On July 7, 1940, they moved again mid-season, this time to Batesville, Arkansas where they became the Batesville Pilots. After one more season in 1941, the team disbanded.
