= Mahaffey Park =

Baseball and football field in Canton, Ohio

Coordinates: 40°48′0″N 81°22′45″W

Mahaffey Park was a baseball and football field in Canton, Ohio. It was the home of the professional football team called the Canton Bulldogs, which operated off and on during the first quarter of the 20th century. It was also used for baseball from time to time, including as a semi-neutral site by the Cleveland Indians during 1902 and 1903.

The Canton Nadjys of the Tri-State League hosted minor league home games at the park between 1887 and 1894. Cy Young played for the Canton Nadjys in 1890.

The field was located at what is now the corner of Tuscarawas Street West (to the south) and McKinley Avenue Northwest (to the east). Timken High School occupies the site today.
