= Kyle Stowers =

American baseball player (born 1998)

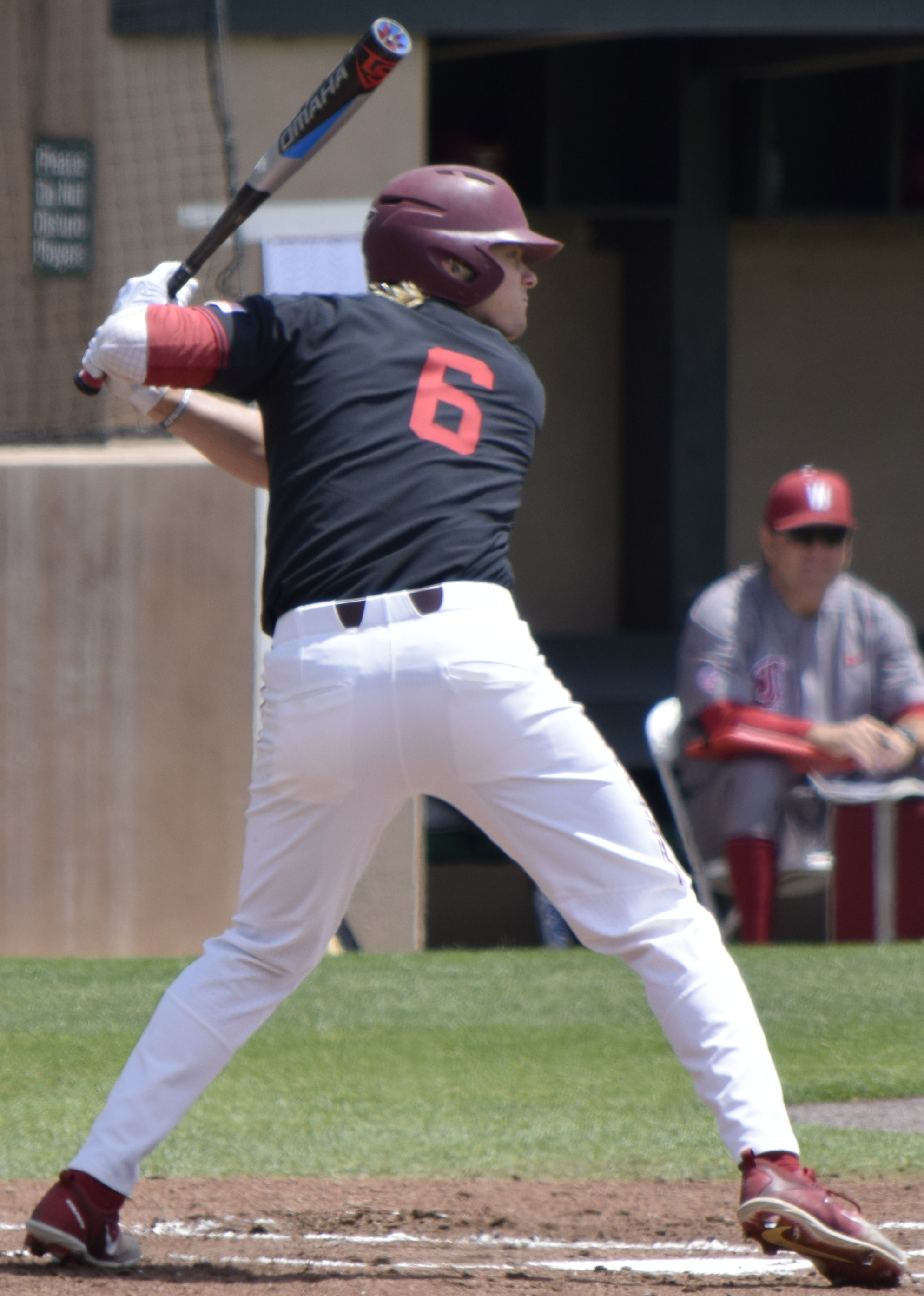
- Stowers at Stanford in 2018

Miami Marlins – No. 28
- First baseman / Outfielder
- Born: January 2, 1998 (age 28); El Cajon, California, U.S.
- Bats: Left Throws: Left

MLB debut
- June 13, 2022, for the Baltimore Orioles

MLB statistics (through 2026 season)
- Batting average: .248
- Home runs: 52
- Runs batted in: 173
- Stats at Baseball Reference

Teams
- Baltimore Orioles (2022–2024); Miami Marlins (2024–present)

Career highlights and awards
- All-Star (2025)

Kyle Jacob Stowers (/ˈstaʊərs/ STOW-ərs; born January 2, 1998) is an American professional baseball first baseman and outfielder for the Miami Marlins of Major League Baseball (MLB). He has previously played in MLB for the Baltimore Orioles. In 2025, Stowers was named to his first All-Star game.

== Amateur career ==
Stowers attended Christian High School in El Cajon, California, and Stanford University, where he played college baseball for the Stanford Cardinal. In 2018, he played collegiate summer baseball with the Falmouth Commodores of the Cape Cod Baseball League and was named a league all-star. As a junior in 2019, he batted .303 with nine home runs and 39 RBIs over 55 games. He was drafted by the Baltimore Orioles in the second round of the 2019 Major League Baseball draft.

== Professional career ==
=== Baltimore Orioles ===
==== Minor Leagues ====
Stowers made his professional debut with the Low–A Aberdeen IronBirds. He did not play in a game in 2020 due to the cancellation of the minor league season because of the COVID-19 pandemic. He started 2021 with Aberdeen before being promoted to the Double–A Bowie Baysox. He was later promoted to the Triple–A Norfolk Tides. Over 124 games between the three teams, he slashed .278/.383/.514 with 27 home runs and 85 RBIs. After the season, he played in the Arizona Fall League for the Mesa Solar Sox. Stowers started the season with Triple-A Norfolk.

==== Major Leagues ====
Stowers made his major-league debut as the starting left fielder batting eighth in an 11–1 loss to the Toronto Blue Jays at Rogers Centre on June 13, 2022. His only hit in three at bats was an opposite-field, seventh-inning double off Julian Merryweather that drove in Adley Rutschman with the Orioles' lone run. He and Rico Garcia had been promoted from the Norfolk Tides earlier that day as substitutes for Anthony Santander and Keegan Akin who were both placed on the restricted list for having been unvaccinated against COVID-19 at the time. He was removed from the 40-man roster and returned to Norfolk on June 17.

Stowers replaced Brett Phillips on the team's 40-man roster when his contract was selected from the Tides two months later on August 19. His first-ever MLB home run was a two-out 0–2 pitch off Liam Hendriks which he sent to the bleachers in center field in the bottom of the ninth to tie at 3–3 an eventual eleven-inning 4–3 Orioles victory over the Chicago White Sox at Camden Yards six days later on August 25. Two pitches earlier, he had hit what was a potential game-ending foul out down the left-field line which was muffed by Adam Engel.

In 2023, Stowers played in only 14 games with the Orioles, going 2–for–30 (.067) with no home run nor RBI. The rest of his year was spent in the minors, where he missed two months of the season with shoulder inflammation.

In 2024, despite a strong spring training that saw him hit .256 with 7 home runs and 14 RBIs, Stowers was optioned to Triple–A Norfolk to begin the year. He surpassed Christian Walker for most career home runs in Orioles minor-league affiliate history with three in a 26–11 away win over the Charlotte Knights on April 3. He also went 4-for-7 with three runs scored and 7 RBIs. Two weeks after his recall by the Orioles on May 13, he established an MLB-career-high four RBIs with three hits including two doubles in an 11–3 home win over the Boston Red Sox on May 27. In 19 games for Baltimore, Stowers hit .306/.297/.500 with one home run and nine RBIs.

=== Miami Marlins ===
On July 30, 2024, the Orioles traded Stowers and Connor Norby to the Miami Marlins in exchange for pitcher Trevor Rogers. He made 50 appearances for Miami down the stretch, batting .186/.262/.295 with two home runs and 15 RBI.

On May 3, 2025, Stowers hit a walk-off grand slam off of Mason Miller of the Athletics. Prior to the 2025 All-Star break, Stowers hit .293/.365/.543 with 19 home runs and 54 RBI. He was named to the All-Star Game as the Marlins' only representative. On July 13 against the Baltimore Orioles, Stowers went 5-for-5, with three home runs and six RBI. He followed in the next game, the first after the break on July 18, with two home runs and an RBI single against the Kansas City Royals. He became the first MLB player with a two-game span of five home runs, where one of them was a walk-off. His five homers in two games are a new franchise record, and he tied these franchise records: hits in eight consecutive at-bats, reaching base in ten consecutive plate appearances, and eleven RBI in two games. Stowers was named the National League Player of the Month for July after hitting .364/.451/.818 for the month, with 16 runs, five doubles, 10 home runs, and 20 RBI. He was the first Marlin to win Player of the Month since Giancarlo Stanton in August 2017.

Awards
Preceded by Juan Soto	National League Player of the Month; July 2025	Succeeded by Brice Turang
