= Harrison Wickel =

American baseball player and scout

Harrison Paine "Muck" Wickel (September 6, 1912 – March 25, 1989) was an American minor league baseball player, manager as well as a scout and World War II veteran. He was also inducted into the Bucks County Chapter of the Pennsylvania Sports Hall of Fame.

== Playing career ==
Born in Reading, Pennsylvania, Wickel played from 1935 to 1942 and in 1946. He hit a combined .317 in 951 games, hitting as high as .368 in a season and as many as 23 home runs. In 1937, he led the Northeast Arkansas League with 124 RBI. In 1939, he led the Mountain State League with 142 RBI. He was an all-star shortstop in the 1936 Northeast Arkansas League and in 1939 and 1941 in the Mountain State League.

== Managing career ==
Wickel managed from 1936 to 1942 and in 1946. He managed the West Plains Badgers in 1936, the Caruthersville Pilots in 1936 and 1937, the New Iberia Cardinals in 1938, the Daytona Beach Islanders in 1938, the Williamson Red Birds from 1939 to 1941, the Columbus Red Birds in 1942 and the Decatur Commodores. He led the Pilots to a league championship in 1936 and the Williamson Red Birds to a league championship in 1940. He was replaced by Jimmy Sanders in 1938. As Sanders took Wickel's job with the Islanders in 1938, Wickel took Sanders' job with the Cardinals, so effectively it was a managerial trade.

Wickel died in Sherman Oaks, California, in 1989.
