= Andy Reese =

American baseball player (1904-1966)

- Infielder / Outfielder
- Born: February 7, 1904; Tupelo, Mississippi, U.S.
- Died: January 10, 1966 (aged 61); Tupelo, Mississippi, U.S.
- Batted: Right Threw: Right

MLB debut
- April 15, 1927, for the New York Giants

Last MLB appearance
- August 24, 1930, for the New York Giants

MLB statistics
- Batting average: .281
- Home runs: 14
- Runs batted in: 111
- Stats at Baseball Reference

Teams
- New York Giants (1927–1930)

Andrew Jackson Reese (February 7, 1904 – January 10, 1966) was an American professional baseball player. He played all or part of four seasons in Major League Baseball for the New York Giants, appearing at all four infield and all three outfield positions. He also played minor league baseball for the Memphis Chicks of the Southern Association. His older brother was Vanderbilt halfback Gil Reese. He may have attended Southern College.

As a multi–sport athlete at Vanderbilt University, Andy Reese allegedly began play in minor league baseball in his hometown for the 1925 Tupelo Wolves under the pseudonym Tidbit Bynum in order to protect his collegiate eligibility. However, Vanderbilt coaches became aware of his professional baseball play, ending his college athletic career. Reese then continued in his baseball career.

In 331 games over four seasons, Reese posted a .281 batting average (321-for-1142) with 166 runs, 14 home runs and 111 RBI. He finished his career with a .950 fielding percentage.
