= Sheffield-Tuscumbia Twins =

- 1926–1926; Sheffield, Alabama

Minor league affiliations
- Previous classes: Class D
- League: Tri-State League

The Sheffield-Tuscumbia Twins were a Minor League Baseball team that represented Sheffield, Alabama and Tuscumbia, Alabama in the Tri-State League in 1926.
