= Charles Carpenter (cricketer) =

English cricketer

Personal information
- Full name: Charles Wilson Carpenter
- Born: c. 1837; Brighton, Sussex, England
- Died: 5 March 1876 (aged 38–39); Nagpur, Central Provinces, British Raj
- Batting: Right-handed
- Bowling: Unknown

Domestic team information
- Years: Team
- 1868: Sussex

Career statistics
Competition	First-class
Matches	3
Runs scored	47
Batting average	7.83
100s/50s	–/–
Top score	15
Balls bowled	140
Wickets	3
Bowling average	15.00
5 wickets in innings	–
10 wickets in match	–
Best bowling	3/32
Catches/stumpings	2/–
- Source: Cricinfo, 17 January 2012

Charles Wilson Carpenter (c. 1837 – 5 March 1876) was an English cricketer. Carpenter was a right-handed batsman, though his bowling style is unknown. He was born at Brighton, Sussex, and was educated at Brighton College.

Carpenter made his first-class debut for the Gentlemen of Kent and Sussex against the Gentlemen of England at the St Lawrence Ground, Canterbury, in 1857. He scored 15 runs in the Gentlemen of Kent and Sussex's first-innings of 143, before being dismissed by Harvey Fellows. In the Gentlemen of England's first-innings, he took the wickets of Spencer Ponsonby, William Nicholson and Charles Morse, finishing with figures of 3/32 to help bowl them out for just 67. The Gentlemen of Kent and Sussex made 85 in their second-innings, with Carpenter scoring 5 runs before he was dismissed by John Parker. He went wicketless in the Gentlemen of England's second-innings, with Gentlemen of Kent and Sussex winning by 42 runs. Over ten years later he made two first-class appearances in 1868 Sussex against Surrey and Middlesex. He struggled in these two matches, scoring 27 runs at an average of 6.75, with a high score of 11.

He died at Nagpur in the British Raj on 5 March 1876.
