= Altoona Rams =

- 1904–1912; Altoona, Pennsylvania

Minor league affiliations
- Previous classes: Independent (1904-1906); Class B (1907-1914)
- League: Tri-State League

Minor league titles
- League titles: 1 (1910)

Team data
- Previous names: Altoona Mountaineers (1904-1909); Altoona Rams (1910-1912)

The Altoona Rams were a minor league baseball club, based in Altoona, Pennsylvania, that existed between 1907 and 1912. The team was founded in 1904 as the Altoona Mountaineers and played under that name until 1907, when the team changed to the Rams moniker. Altoona played in the Tri-State League along with teams from Pennsylvania, New Jersey, and Delaware.

Bill Steele pitched for the Rams in 1910, when he led the Tri-State League in wins, with 25.

== Year-by-year record ==
Year	Record	Finish	Manager	Notes
1904	50-48	4th	Charles Carpenter	
1905	52-73	6th	Germany Smith / J.R. Bockel	
1906	64-62	4th	Arthur Irwin	
1907	61-61	5th	Arthur Irwin / John Farrell	
1908	49-78	7th	John Farrell	
1909	59-55	4th	Ed Ashenbach	
1910	72-38	1st	Henry Ramsey	League champions
1911	51-56	5th	Henry Ramsey	
1912	12-22	6th	Charles Babb	Team moved June 13 to become the Reading Pretzels
