= George Bausewine =

American baseball player (1869–1947)

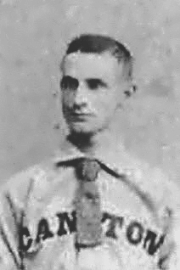
- Bausewine in 1887 with Canton of the Ohio State League
- Pitcher / Umpire
- Born: March 22, 1869; Philadelphia, Pennsylvania, US
- Died: July 29, 1947 (aged 78); Norristown, Pennsylvania, US
- Batted: Unknown Threw: Unknown

MLB debut
- September 14, 1889, for the Philadelphia Athletics

Last MLB appearance
- October 11, 1889, for the Philadelphia Athletics

MLB statistics
- Win–loss record: 1–4
- Earned run average: 3.90
- Strikeouts: 18
- Stats at Baseball Reference

Teams
- Philadelphia Athletics (1889)

George W. Bausewine (March 22, 1869 – July 29, 1947) was an American professional baseball pitcher and umpire in Major League Baseball (MLB). He umpired in the National League during the 1905 season. He had previously been a pitcher in professional baseball, and he spent part of one season pitching in MLB for the Philadelphia Athletics.

== Career ==
=== Playing career ===
Bausewine first played professional baseball at the age of 18 for the Utica Pent-ups minor league baseball club of the International League in 1887. He also played for the Altoona club of the Pennsylvania State Association, and the Canton club of the Ohio State League that year. In 1888, the Ohio State League became the Tri-State League and he played a full season with the Canton Nadjys.

Bausewine moved around to several minor league clubs in 1889, including the London Tecumsehs of the International League, before being signed by the Philadelphia Athletics of the American Association on September 10. He pitched in seven game for the Athletics that season; he had a 1–4 Win–loss record, and completed all six of the games he started. In 55 1/3 innings pitched, he struck out 18 batters and had a 3.90 earned run average. He was released from the team before the 1890 season on April 5. After his return to the minor leagues in 1890, he played for various teams until 1895, including teams in St. Paul, Minnesota, Albany, New York, Allentown, Pennsylvania, Syracuse, New York, and Wilkes-Barre, Pennsylvania.

=== Umpiring career ===
Bausewine's first stint as a professional umpire came in the Western Association in 1890, when he took a hiatus from pitching after he was unable to sign with another major league club. He lasted about a month in that role before he was assaulted by a team executive; he returned to play in the minor leagues for a few years.

He was a member of the National League umpiring crew for the 1905 season, and he appeared in 123 games that year; he worked 100 games as the home plate umpire, and 23 at first base. Although it was his only season at the major league level, he is credited with 13 player or manager ejections, including future Hall of Fame player Honus Wagner. On August 2, Wagner was called out at first base on a close play, who showed his displeasure during warmups the next inning by throwing a baseball near Bausewine, who then ejected him from the game. Wagner received a three-game suspension and a $40 fine for his actions from League President Harry Pulliam. This was Wagner's third suspension of the season. Wagner commented that Bausewine was in no danger of his throw and probably would not have done anything had the Giants not said that he had tried to hit him.

On August 5, 1905, Bausewine was umpiring a game between the Pittsburgh Pirates and the New York Giants with the score tied 5–5 in the ninth inning. The Giants argued with him over a close call at third base, and the team refused to return to the game. Bausewine ruled the game a forfeit to the Pirates. New York appealed the forfeiture to League President Pulliam‚ but he upheld the decision by Bausewine.

== Personal life ==
After his umpiring career, he settled in Norristown, Pennsylvania, with his wife Emma. He and wife had two children, a son and a daughter.

He joined the local police department as an officer. He served the department for 29 years, retiring in 1944 as their chief of police. That year, Bausewine was convicted of a bribery charge related to allegations that he accepted payments in exchange for not investigating gambling operations. In 1946, the Supreme Court of Pennsylvania overturned the conviction, declaring that the evidence against Bausewine was "clearly insufficient".

Bausewine died in his sleep on July 29, 1947, in Norristown at the age of 78, and is interred at Arlington Cemetery in Drexel Hill, Pennsylvania.
