= Canton Nadjys =

US minor league baseball team (1887–1890)

- 1888–1890; (1887–1890); Canton, Ohio

Minor league affiliations
- Class: Independent (1887–1890)
- League: Ohio State League (1887); Tri-State League (1888–1890)

Major league affiliations
- Team: None

Minor league titles
- League titles (1): 1889

Team data
- Name: Canton (1887); Canton Nadjys (1888–1890)
- Ballpark: Mahaffey Park (1887–1890)

The Canton Nadjys were a minor league baseball team based in Canton, Ohio. The "Canton" franchise began minor league play as members of the 1887 Ohio State League and the Canton "Najys" continued play as members of the newly named Tri-State League from 1888 to 1890, winning the 1889 league championship. The Canton teams hosted home minor league games at Mahaffey Park.

Baseball Hall of Fame charter member and namesake of the Cy Young Award, Denton Cy Young pitched for the league champion Nadjys in 1890, in his first professional season. Young acquired his "Cy" nickname during his Canton season.

The team's nickname refers to a type of horse that was common on farms in the region in the era.

== History ==
=== 1887: Ohio State League ===
Minor league baseball in Canton, Ohio began in 1887, when the Canton team became members of the eight-team Ohio State League during the season. Canton joined the league and began play on August 4, 1887. The league began play on May 4, 1887, with the Akron Acorns, Columbus Buckeyes, Kalamazoo Kazoos, Mansfield, Sandusky Suds (53-49), Steubenville Stubs, Wheeling Nail Cities and Zanesville Kickapoos teams as members. Steubenville had disbanded on June 29, 1887, before Canton replaced them as the eighth team.

Beginning Ohio State League play on August 4, 1887, Canton compiled a 22–14 record in completing the season, playing under manager William Zecher. The Kalamazoo Kazoos were the eventual league champions when the league completed play on September 28, 1887.

=== 1888 to 1890: Tri-State League ===
The Canton "Nadjys" continued minor league baseball play in 1888, as the Ohio State League was renamed to become the Tri-State League, beginning play with ten teams. The Nadjys joined the Columbus Senators, Jackson Jaxons, Kalamazoo Kazoos, Lima Lushers, Mansfield Pioneers, Sandusky Fish Eaters, Toledo Maumees, Wheeling Nail Cities and Zanesville Kickapoos teams in beginning the season schedule on April 22, 1888.

The "Nadjys" nickname for the team corresponds to horse terms of the region in the era. A Nadjy is a type of field horse that was common on Ohio farms.

The 1888 Canton Nadjys placed fourth in the final Tri-State League season standings. The Nadjys ended the season with 50–64 record, playing under managers William Zecher and James Harmon. Canton finished the season 23.5 games behind the first place Lima Lushers.

In 1889, the Tri State League played as a six-team league, with the Dayton Reds, Hamilton, Mansfield Pioneers, Springfield and Wheeling Nailers teams continuing play with Canton. The 1889 Canton Nadjys captured the Tri-State League championship. With a regular season record of 67–37, Canton ended the season in first place in the standings and were managed by William Harrington. The Nadjys finished 8.0 games ahead of the second place Springfield (61–48) in the regular season standings, followed by Mansfield, Dayton, Hamilton and Wheeling.

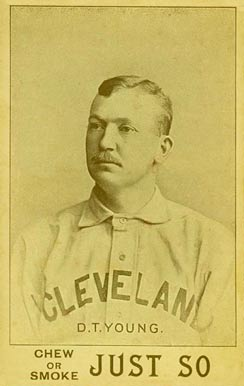
(1893) Baseball Hall of Fame charter member, Cy Young. Young began his professional career with the Canton Nadjys in 1890.

==== Cy Young 1890 ====
Baseball Hall of Fame charter member Cy Young, the namesake of the Cy Young Award began his professional career with the 1890 Canton Nadjys. His nickname also began while playing with Canton. Young was signed by Canton in the spring of 1890 as a 23-year-old. Young was a farmer and semipro pitcher, who was from nearby Gilmore, Ohio. During his tryout with Canton, Young featured his fastball, which eventually led to his nickname. "I almost tore the boards off the grandstand with my fast ball," Young recalled. Cy Young's nickname came from the damaged fences, which looked like a cyclone had hit them. Reporters then shortened the nickname to "Cy", which Young used for the rest of his lifetime. During the 1890 season with Canton, Young had a record of 15-15. Young was reportedly obtained from Canton by the major league Cleveland Spiders during the season in exchange for $300.00 and a new suit for their manager.

Young made his debut for Canton on April 30, 1890. In the first game of the season, "Cyclone" Young threw a three-hit game as Canton defeated Wheeling by the score of 4–2. In his second appearance, on May 3, 1890, Young defeated McKeesport 4–3. On July 25, 1890, Young threw a no-hitter against McKeesport with 18 strikeouts. That was his final game with Canton, as Young was obtained by the Cleveland Spiders, who had been scouting Young during the season. Young made his major league debut with the Cleveland Spiders on August 6, 1890, beginning a career of 22 seasons and a record 511 wins.

In their final season of play, despite having Cy Young on the roster, the Nadjys finished in last place in the 1890 Tri-State League standings. The league began the season as an eight–team league before losing the Dayton and Springfield franchises during the season. The team ended the Ohio State League season with an overall regular season record of 26–48, managed by William Heingartner, Jimmy Peoples, Cicero Hiner and Jack Grogan. Canton finished 13.0 games behind the first place Mansfield Pioneers in the final regular season standings when the season ended on August 9, 1890.

The Tri-State League did not return to play in 1891. Canton next hosted minor league baseball when the 1893 and 1894 Canton "Duebers" played as members of the Ohio-Michigan League and Interstate League respectively. The Duebers were named for the Canton-based Dueber-Hampden Watch Company and played the final minor league seasons at Mahaffey Park, which had hosted all Canton minor league home games.

== The ballpark ==
The Canton minor league teams hosted home games at Mahaffey Park in the seasons from 1887 to 1894. The ballpark site was located at West Tuscarawa Street & McKinley Avenue in Canton. Today, the former ballpark site is home to Timken High School. Timken High School is located at 231 McKinley Ave NW in Canton, Ohio.

== Timeline ==
Year(s)	# Yrs.	Team	Level	League	Ballpark
1887	1	Canton	Independent	Ohio State League	Mahaffey Park
1888–1890	1	Canton Nadjys	Independent	Tri-State League	Mahaffey Park

== Year-by-year records ==
Year	Record	Finish	Manager	Playoffs
1887	22–14	NA	William Zecher	Canton joined league August 4
1888	50–64	4th	William Zecher /James Harmon	No playoffs held
1889	67–37	1st	William Harrington	League champions
1890	26–48	6th	William Heingartner / Jimmy Peoples; Cicero Hiner / Jack Grogan	No playoffs held

== Notable alumni ==
- Cy Young (1890) Inducted Baseball Hall of Fame, 1937
- George Bausewine (1887–1888)
- Tun Berger (1889)
- Charlie Briggs (1888)
- Steve Brodie (1887)
- Bill Delaney (1887–1889)
- Alexander Donoghue (1887–1888)
- Jack Doyle (1889)
- Jim Green (1889)
- Jim Handiboe (1890)
- Bill Irwin (1890)
- Jim Long (1890)
- Dusty Miller (1889)
- George Pechiney (1888)
- Jimmy Peoples (1890, MGR)
- Charlie Reilly (1890)
- Ben Sanders (1887)
- Ed Sixsmith (1888)
- George Strief (1890)
- Jake Virtue (1887–1888)
- Tom Wiliams (1890)
- Henry Yaik (1890)

== See also ==
- Canton Nadjys players
- Canton (minor league baseball) players
