= Mann Field =

Ballpark in Newport, Arkansas

Mann Field was a ballpark located in Newport, Arkansas, United States that served as the home stadium to the Newport Cardinals (1936–1938) and Newport Dodgers (1940–1941). Built in the 1930s, it was named after Louis P. Mann, superintendent of Newport High School, where the field was located. It was a Works Progress Administration project.

In its history, it was also known as Greyhound Field and Memorial Field.
