= Williamsport Millionaires =

The Williamsport Millionaires were a minor league baseball team based in Williamsport, Pennsylvania from 1906 to 1910. Many teams in this era never adopted formal nicknames and neither did the Millionaires. The Millionaire name was used in reference to the mansions downtown known as "Millionaire Row". Some of the mansions have hidden rooms and were once involved with the underground railroad. The same nickname was adopted by the high school.

- Location: Williamsport, Pennsylvania
- League: Tri-State League 1906–1910
- Affiliation: None
- Ballpark: various fields in Williamsport
