= Charles F. Carpenter =

American baseball player

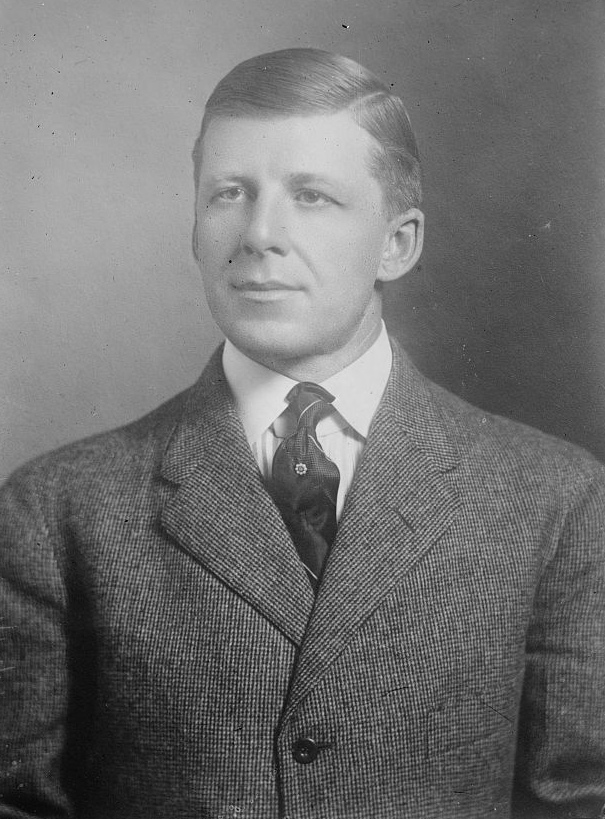
Charles F. Carpenter

Charles F. Carpenter was President of the Tri-State League in baseball from 1906 to 1913. He was forced into retirement in 1913 by the club owners.
