= Jack McAdams =

American baseball player (1886–1937)

- Pitcher
- Born: December 17, 1886; Bryant, Arkansas, U.S.
- Died: May 21, 1937 (aged 50); San Francisco, California, U.S.
- Batted: Right Threw: Right

MLB debut
- July 22, 1911, for the St. Louis Cardinals

Last MLB appearance
- September 4, 1911, for the St. Louis Cardinals

MLB statistics
- Win–loss record: 0–0
- Earned run average: 3.72
- Strikeouts: 4
- Stats at Baseball Reference

Teams
- St. Louis Cardinals (1911)

George Decalve "Jack" McAdams (December 17, 1886 – May 21, 1937) was an American Major League Baseball pitcher who played in 1911 with the St. Louis Cardinals.
