= Charles William Carpenter =

Charles William Carpenter (1886–1971), was a notable 20th Century Baptist minister and Civil Rights activist.

== Early life ==
Carpenter was born on May 1, 1886, in Stanford, Kentucky, a son of James and Amanda Carpenter. In 1901, a year after the death of his father, his mother moved the family to Indianapolis, Indiana, where William worked at odd jobs during the day and attended public school at night.

== Education ==
At the age of 18 in 1904, he entered night school at Tuskegee Institute where he studied chemistry with Dr. George Washington Carver. He was also associated with Dr. Booker T. Washington, at whose Long Island summer home he worked during the summer of 1908. Graduating in 1909 as valedictorian of his class, he entered the study of theology at Wilberforce University in Ohio and at Garrett Biblical Institute in Illinois, completing his studies in 1912.

== Career ==
Carpenter entered the ministry in 1912 and was an active Baptist minister for fifty-four years, serving first in Detroit, and at churches in Minnesota, Illinois, Indiana, and Canada, before settling in Ann Arbor, Michigan, as pastor of the Second Baptist Church for 37 years, retiring on his 80th birthday in 1966. At his retirement, the Common Council of Ann Arbor passed a resolution commending him for his outstanding community service. He died on September 29, 1971, at Ann Arbor, Michigan. His correspondence, including letters from Mr. and Mrs. Booker T. Washington and sermons, prayers, church bulletins, reports of the Second Baptist Church and other materials concerning his work with the Ann Arbor Human Relations Commission, the Citizens Advisory Committee for a Workable Program, and the Ann Arbor Bus Committee, are preserved at the Bentley Historical Library at the University of Michigan.
