= Charles Morse (cricketer) =

English cricket player (1820–1883)

Charles Morse (20 August 1820 – 25 March 1883) was an English cricketer who played first-class cricket for Cambridge University, the Marylebone Cricket Club, the England team and other amateur teams between 1842 and 1862. He was born in Norwich, Norfolk and died at Dresden in Germany.

Morse was educated at Dedham, Essex and at Trinity College, Cambridge. He played cricket as a lower-order right-handed batsman for the Cambridge University side from 1842 to 1844 and appeared in the University Match against Oxford University in all three seasons. But his only innings of note in this period was a score of 82 made for the MCC against Cambridge University in 1844; this proved to be his highest first-class score and his only score over 50 in a 20-year cricket career spanning 40 first-class games. A contemporary report described his innings: "Mr. Morse played with caution, and now and then indulged in a severity of hitting which was really cricket."

Morse graduated from Cambridge University with a Bachelor of Arts degree in 1844 and then was admitted to the Inner Temple; he was called to the bar in 1848 but never practised as a barrister. Instead he settled at Aylsham and became a Justice of the Peace and deputy lieutenant of Norfolk. This career enabled him to continue to play cricket fairly frequently through to his 40s, though rarely did he make much impact as a batsman, and he did not bowl in major matches. In 1849, for example, he was a member of a very strong "England" side (the All England Eleven) in a game against Surrey, playing alongside John Wisden, Alfred Mynn, Fuller Pilch and Jemmy Dean.
