= Tri-State League =

Five circuits in American minor league baseball

The Tri-State League was the name of six different circuits in American minor league baseball.

== History ==
The first league of that name played for four years (1887–1890) and consisted of teams in Ohio, Michigan and West Virginia. The Canton Nadjys won the 1889 Tri State League championship. Cy Young pitched for the Nadjys in his first professional season and acquired his "Cy" nickname while pitching for Canton.

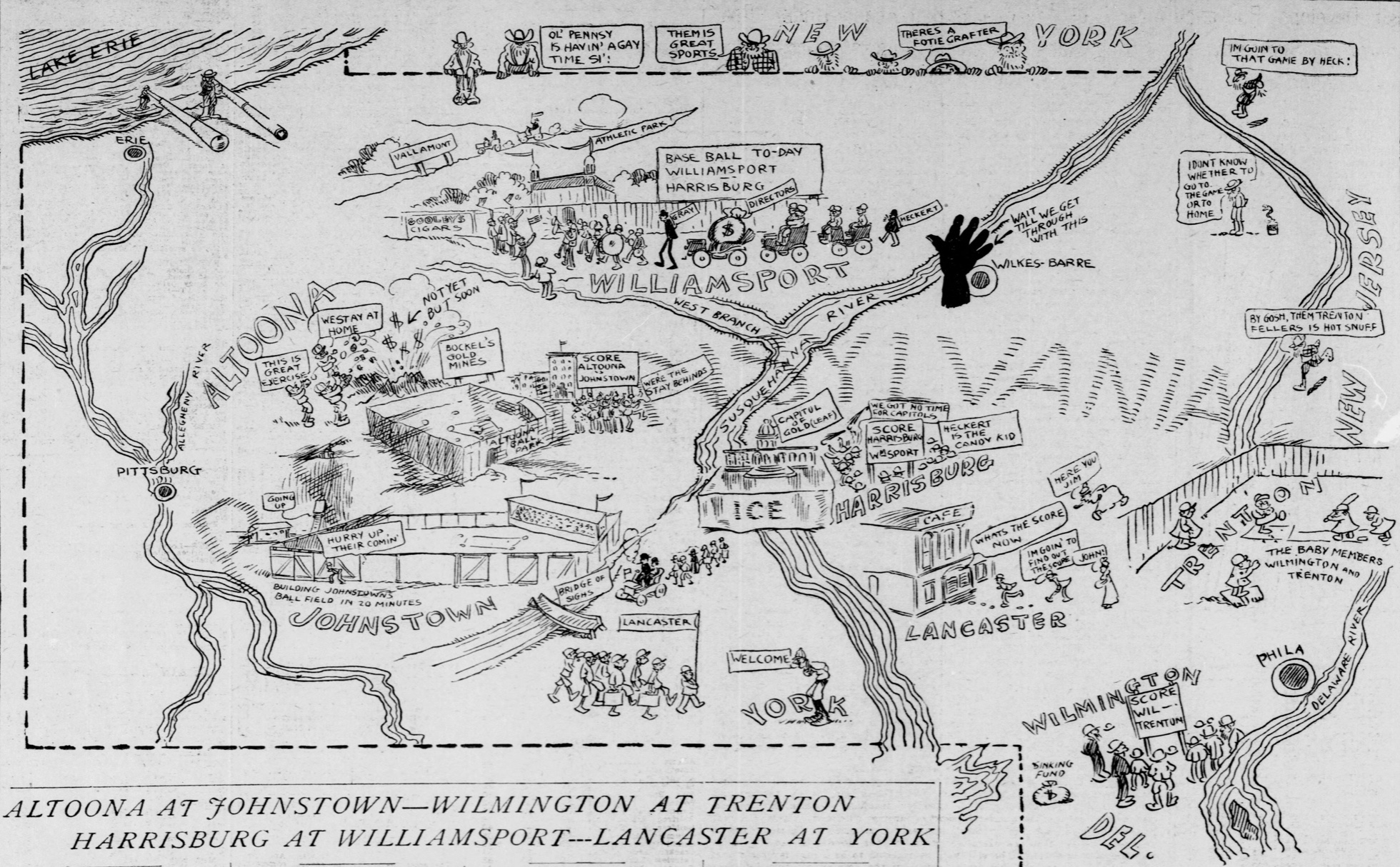
"Clubs Start The Dance Today Around the Tri-State League Circuit", April 24, 1907

The second league, played from 1904–1914, and had member clubs in Delaware, New Jersey and Pennsylvania.

The League contested its 1904 championship game in Philadelphia between York and Williamsport and attracted 3,500 fans to the Phillies' ball park

Charles F. Carpenter was president from 1906 to 1913.

During the 1920s, two versions of the Tri-State League briefly existed: a 1924 loop with clubs in Iowa, Nebraska and South Dakota, and a 1925–1926 association located in Tennessee, Mississippi and Arkansas.

In the late 1930s another iteration existed for two years, composed of six teams from Wisconsin, Illinois and Indiana in its first season, and just four teams excluding Indiana in its second.

The most recent incarnation of the league was the post-World War II Tri-State, a Class B circuit with clubs in Tennessee, North Carolina and South Carolina. This league, which played from 1946–1955, typically included clubs in Charlotte, Asheville, Knoxville, Rock Hill and Spartanburg; most of its teams were affiliated with Major League Baseball farm systems.

The attendance crisis in the minor leagues of the 1950s—and the defection of clubs like Charlotte to higher-classification loops—eventually took its toll on the Tri-State League. In its last season, 1955, there were only four clubs in the league. Its last champion was the Spartanburg Peaches, an affiliate of the Cleveland Indians.

There were teams in southern Maryland that played in a "Tri-State League" in at least the 60s, 70s, and the 80s. There was a team called the Pomonkey Giants associated with a Pomonkey social club in Pomonkey Maryland. They played teams in Berry Road near La Plata, Maryland and in Hughesville among others. It was very much a rural league and almost totally black players. The team is mentioned in the obituary of a player and coach, George Dyson, Jr in 2020.

One of the most extensive discussions of this Tri-State League explains how integration of Major League baseball led to the demise of the Negro leagues. It became neighborhood baseball.

== Teams ==
=== 1887 ===
- Played as Ohio State League

=== 1888–1890 ===
- Akron Acorns (1890)
- Canton (1888, 1890)
- Canton Nadjys (1889)
- Columbus Senators (1888)
- Dayton Reds (1889–1890)
- Hamilton (1889)
- Jackson Jaxons (1888)
- Kalamazoo Kazoos (1888)
- Lima Lushers (1888)
- Mansfield Pioneers (1890)
- McKeesport Tubers (1890)
- Sandusky Fish Eaters (1888)
- Springfield (1889–1890)
- Toledo Maumees (1888)
- Wheeling Nail Cities (1888)
- Wheeling Nailers (1889–1890)
- Youngstown Giants (1890)
- Zanesville Kickapoos (1888)

=== 1904–1914 ===
- Allentown (1912–1914)
- Altoona Mountaineers (1904–1909)
- Altoona Rams (1910–1912)
- Atlantic City (1912–1913)
- Camden (1904)
- Chester (1912)
- Harrisburg Senators (1904–1914)
- Johnstown Johnnies (1905–1908)
- Johnstown Jawns (1909)
- Johnstown Johns (1910–1912)
- Lancaster Red Roses (1905–1912, 1914)
- Lebanon (1904)
- Reading Pretzels (1907–1912, 1914)
- Shamokin (1905)
- Trenton Tigers 1907–1914
- Williamsport Millionaires (1904–1910)
- Wilmington Peaches (1904–1908)
- Wilmington Chicks (1911–1914)
- York Penn Parks (1904)
- York White Roses (1905–1907, 1909–1914)

=== 1924 ===
- Beatrice Blues
- Grand Island Islanders
- Hastings Cubs
- Norfolk Elk Horns
- Sioux City Cardinals
- Sioux Falls Canaries

=== 1925–1926 ===
- Blytheville Tigers (1925–1926)
- Corinth Corinthians (1925–1926)
- Dyersburg Deers (1925)
- Jackson Giants (1925)
- Jackson Jays (1926)
- Jonesboro Buffaloes (1925–1926)
- Sheffield-Tuscumbia Twins (1926)
- Tupelo Wolves (1925–1926)

=== 1938–1939 ===
- Chicago Harley Mills (1938–1939)
- Elgin All-Stars (1938)
- Fort Wayne Harvesters (1938)
- Madison Blues (1938–1939)
- Sheboygan Chairmakers (1938–1939)
- Spencer Coals (1938–1939)

=== 1946–1955 ===
- Anderson A's (1946)
- Anderson Rebels (1947–1954)
- Asheville Tourists (1946–1955)
- Charlotte Hornets (1946–1953)
- Fayetteville Cubs (1947–1948)
- Florence Steelers (1948–1950)
- Gastonia Rockets (1952–1953)
- Greenville Spinners (1951–1952, 1954–1955)
- Greenwood Tigers (1951)
- Knoxville Smokies (1946–1952, 1954)
- Reidsville Luckies (1947)
- Rock Hill Chiefs (1947–1955)
- Shelby Cubs (1946)
- Spartanburg Spartans (1946)
- Spartanburg Peaches (1947–1955)
- Sumter Chicks (1949–1950)

== Standings & statistics ==
=== 1888 – 1890 ===
1888 Tri-State League - schedule
President: W.H. McDermith

Team standings	W	L	PCT	GB	Managers
Lima Lushers	74	35	.679	–	William Harrington
Wheeling Nail Cities	71	43	.623	5½	Bill Otterson / Al Buckenberger
Columbus Senators	64	50	.561	12½	Jim Curry / Frank Arnold
Canton	50	64	.439	26½	William Zecher / J.H. Harmon
Toledo Maumees	46	68	.403	30½	Harry Smith / Frank Mountain / Robert Wood
Mansfield Pioneers	43	74	.368	35	Frank Torreyson / Frank O'Brien / James Green / Ed Darrow
Jackson Jaxons	30	83	.264	46	George Burbridge / Jim Curry/ Jay Moore / James Trayy
Kalamazoo Kazoos	62	37	.626	NA	Norris O'Neil
Zanesville Kickapoos	63	39	.618	NA	Peter McShannic / Al Swift (7/27); William Harrington
Sandusky Fish Eaters	44	54	.449	NA	Horace Lockwood / James Hever / W.E. Rutter

Kalamazoo, Zanesville and Sandusky disbanded.
No playoffs held.

Player statistics
Player	Team	Stat	Tot
John Kirby	Lima	BA	.369
Sam Nichol	Wheeling	Runs	112
Buck West	Colum/Wheel	Hits	150
Sam Nichol	Wheeling	Hits	150
George Rooks	Lima	HR	13
Henry Fuller	Lima	SB	103

1889 Tri-State League
President: W.H. McDermith

Team standings	W	L	PCT	GB	Managers
Canton Nadjys	67	37	.644	–	William Harrington
Springfield	61	48	.560	8½	Walter Jennison / Lewis Hill / Harry Fisher
Mansfield Indians	59	50	.541	10½	Christopher Meisel / Robert Carey / Jack Remsen
Dayton Reds	52	54	.491	16	Frank Jones / Timothy Donovan / Frank O'Brien
Hamilton	41	65	.387	27	D.C. Blandy / Edward Hengle
Wheeling Nailers	41	67	.380	28	Ben Sullivan / Sam Nichol / Howell / John Dunn / John Wright / John Crogan

No Playoffs held.

Player statistics
Player	Team	Stat	Tot	Player	Team	Stat	Tot
John Ryn	Canton	BA	.358	Henry Morrison	Mansfield	W	23
Dusty Miller	Canton	Runs	129	R.J. Riley	Canton	PCT	.813 13-3
John Ryn	Canton	Hits	150				
Joseph Sharpe	Canton	SB	83				

1890 Tri-State League
President: W.H. McDermith

Team standings	W	L	PCT	GB	Managers
Mansfield Indians	49	25	.662	–	George Greer
Wheeling Nailers	39	32	.549	8½	Bob Glenalvin / Bill George
Youngstown Giants	38	33	.535	9½	Harry Morton / Michael Cody
Akron Akrons	38	38	.500	12	Charles Pike
McKeesport	36	44	.450	16	Alexander Voss / Frank Torreyson
Canton Nadjys	26	48	.351	23	William Heingartner / James Peeples / Cecero Hiner / Jack Grogan
Dayton Reds	31	27	.534	NA	Timothy Donovan
Springfield	24	34	.414	NA	Harry Fisher

Dayton disbanded July 8; Springfield disbanded July 9

Player statistics
Player	Team	Stat	Tot
Fred Osborne	Wheeling	BA	.397
Frank Goodryder	Mansfield	Runs	81
Fred Betts	Spring/Wheel	Hits	113
Frank Motz	Akron	HR	14

=== 1924 ===
Tri-State League-Class D
President: Richard R. Grotto

Team standings	W	L	PCT	GB	Managers
Beatrice Blues	35	30	.538	-	Ed Reichle
Sioux Falls Canaries	35	30	.538	-	Frank Boyle
Norfolk Elk Horns	31	30	.508	2	Nig Lane
Grand Island Islanders	32	32	.500	2½	Jake Kraninger
Hastings Cubs	29	34	.460	5	Harry Cheek
Sioux City Cardinals	29	35	.453	5½	Joe McDermott

The league disbanded July 17.

Player statistics
Player	Team	Stat	Tot	Player	Team	Stat	Tot
Graeme Snow	Sioux Falls	BA	.339	Edward Shupe	Grand Island	W	15
Pid Purdy	Beatrice	Runs	39	Carlos Dunnagan	Beatrice	PCT	.800 8-2
Pid Purdy	Beatrice	Hits	65				

=== 1946 – 1949 ===
1946 Tri-State League-Class B
President: C.M. Llewellyn

Team standings	W	L	PCT	GB	Managers
Charlotte Hornets	93	46	.669	–	Spencer Abbott
Asheville Tourists	83	57	.593	10½	Bill Sayles
Knoxville Smokies	73	67	.521	20½	Dale Alexander
Shelby Cubs	59	81	.421	34½	Ray Green
Anderson A's	59	81	.421	34½	Clyde McDowell
Spartanburg Spartans	52	87	.374	41	Francis Kappelman

Shelby defeated Anderson in a one game playoff for fourth place; Knoxville 4 games, Asheville 1; Charlotte 4 games, Shelby 2; Finals: Charlotte 4 games, Knoxville 3.

Player statistics
Player	Team	Stat	Tot	Player	Team	Stat	Tot
Dick Bouknight	Asheville	BA	.367	Sonny Dixon	Charlotte	W	19
Al Kvasnak	Charlotte	Runs	101	Ralph Germano	Spartanburg	SO	179
Fred Marsh	Knoxville	Hits	180	Alex Zukowski	Charlotte	ERA	1.41
Bill Sayles	Asheville	RBI	105	Alex Zukowski	Charlotte	PCT	.789 15-4
"Pud" Miller	Spartanburg	HR	19				

1947 Tri-State League-Class B
President: C.M. Llewellyn

Team standings	W	L	PCT	GB	Attend	Managers
Spartanburg Peaches	88	51	.633	–	157,435	Kerby Farrell
Anderson Rebels	84	55	.604	4	150,290	Bob Richards
Knoxville Smokies	73	67	.521	15½	101,189	Dale Alexander
Charlotte Hornets	72	68	.514	16½	116,729	Spencer Abbott / Cal Ermer
Rock Hill Chiefs	68	71	.489	20	91,042	Dan Carnevale
Asheville Tourists	65	74	.468	23	123,897	Bill Sayles
Fayetteville Cubs	61	78	.439	27	63,081	Clyde McDowell
Reidsville Luckies	45	92	.328	42	59,043	Lee Gamble

Playoffs: Charlotte 4 games, Spartanburg 1; Anderson 4 games, Knoxville 2; Finals: Charlotte 4 games, Anderson 3.

Player statistics
Player	Team	Stat	Tot	Player	Team	Stat	Tot
Smoky Burgess	Fayetteville	BA	.387	James Kleckley	Spartanburg	W	20
Fred Barocco	Anderson	Runs	123	Edward Craft	Anderson	SO	185
Sammy Meeks	Charlotte	Hits	191	Robert Callan	Charlotte	ERA	3.08
Al Simononis	Anderson	RBI	132	James Kleckley	Spartanburg	PCT	.769 20-6
Al Simononis	Anderson	HR	27				

1948 Tri-State League-Class B
President: C.M. Llewellyn

Team standings	W	L	PCT	GB	Attend	Managers
Asheville Tourists	95	51	.651	–	122,693	Clay Bryant
Anderson Rebels	77	68	.531	17½	103,180	Bob Richards
Rock Hill Chiefs	76	70	.521	19	85,621	Ed Freed / Dick Bouknight
Fayetteville Cubs	73	71	.507	21	76,956	Skeeter Scalzi
Charlotte Hornets	72	74	.493	23	122,211	Joe Bowman
Knoxville Smokies	71	76	.483	24½	95,164	Dale Alexander / Dave Garcia
Spartanburg Peaches	68	77	.469	26½	98,993	Kerby Farrell
Florence Steelers	50	95	.345	44½	72,569	George Motto / James Martin

Playoffs: Rockhill 3 games, Asheville 1; Fayetteville 3 games, Anderson 1.
Finals: Fayetteville 4 games, Rockhill 1.

Player statistics
Player	Team	Stat	Tot	Player	Team	Stat	Tot
Robert Churchill	Knoxville	BA	.406	Red Dwyer	Rockhill	W	22
Norman Koney	Asheville	Runs	145	Lacy James	Rockhill	SO	213
Robert Churchill	Knoxville	Hits	230	Joe Landrum	Asheville	ERA	2.77
Floyd Fogg	Fayetteville	RBI	144	Bob Spicer	Fayetteville	PCT	.818 18-4
Len Cross	Spartanburg	HR	29				
Robert Churchill	Knoxville	3B	28				

1949 Tri-State League-Class B
President: C.M. Llewellyn

Team standings	W	L	PCT	GB	Attend	Managers
Florence Steelers	87	59	.596	–	60,124	Jim Martin
Spartanburg Peaches	81	60	.574	3½	128,490	Kerby Farrell
Asheville Tourists	76	71	.517	11½	105,899	Ed Head
Rock Hill Chiefs	71	70	.504	13½	98,237	Dick Bouknight
Knoxville Smokies	72	73	.497	14½	94,809	Frank Genovese
Sumter Chicks	65	80	.448	21½	55,309	Wes Livengood / Glen Schaeffer
Charlotte Hornets	62	80	.437	23	94,276	Clyde McDowell
Anderson Rebels	62	83	.428	24½	85,760	Bob Richards

Playoffs: Florence 3 games, Rock Hill 2; Spartanburg 3 games, Asheville 1; Finals: Florence 4 games, Spartanburg 2.

Player statistics
Player	Team	Stat	Tot	Player	Team	Stat	Tot
Robert Churchill	Rock Hill	BA	.360	Melvin Fisher	Florence	W	27
Harold Harrigan	Anderson	Runs	118	John Fitzgerald	Florence	SO	166
Alexander Driskill	Asheville	Hits	172	Survern Wright	Rock Hill	ERA	1.86
Harold Harrigan	Anderson	RBI	121	Al Aber	Spartanburg	PCT	.750 24-8
Harold Harrigan	Anderson	HR	43				
