= Bill Sayles =

American baseball player (1917–1996)

- Pitcher
- Born: July 27, 1917; Portland, Oregon, U.S.
- Died: November 20, 1996 (aged 79); Lincoln City, Oregon, U.S.
- Batted: Right Threw: Right

MLB debut
- July 17, 1939, for the Boston Red Sox

Last MLB appearance
- August 28, 1943, for the Brooklyn Dodgers

MLB statistics
- Win–loss record: 1–3
- Earned run average: 5.61
- Strikeouts: 52
- Stats at Baseball Reference

Teams
- Boston Red Sox (1939); New York Giants (1943); Brooklyn Dodgers (1943)

William Nisbeth Sayles (July 27, 1917 – November 20, 1996) was an American right-handed pitcher in Major League Baseball who played with the Boston Red Sox in the 1939 season, and for the New York Giants and Brooklyn Dodgers in 1943. Born in Portland, Oregon, he also pitched in the 1936 Summer Olympics as part of the "World Champions" team.

Sayles died at age 79 in Lincoln City, Oregon.
