= Charles K. Carpenter =

Charles K. Carpenter (born in 1872 in Illinois, died in 1948) was a prominent minister in northern Illinois and a charter member of the Illinois State Academy of Science. During his years of service as a minister, his avocation was recording observations of nature and preparing study skins and life mounts of animals of the region. After his retirement from the church in 1940, he organized his collections and observations into the Northern Illinois Museum of Natural History, which he maintained at his home in Baileyville, Ogle County, Illinois. After his death in 1948, most of his life mounts were given to a high school, where they remained until 1983 when they were donated to the Illinois State Museum. Many of his bird study skins, egg sets, and photographs were given to Cornell College in Mount Vernon, Iowa; in 1985–1986 these were transferred to the Illinois State Museum. Among his specimens was a life mount of a (now extinct) passenger pigeon, Ectopistes migratorius (Linnaeus, 1766), collected by his father, Edwin A. Carpenter (born in 1846 in Pennsylvania, died in 1919 in Illinois). This specimen is one of only 19 complete and 7 partial skeleton specimens of passenger pigeons known to exist in museum collections.
