= Charles H. Carpenter =

American photographer

- Known for: Photography

Charles H. Carpenter was an American photographer. He is notable for serving as the first photographer for the Field Museum, holding that position from 1899 to 1947. He took over 900 photos of the Hopi in 1900 as part of George A. Dorsey' s Stanley McCormick Hopi Expedition to Arizona and produced 2,000 negatives at the Louisiana Purchase Exposition of 1904.

Collections of his photographs are still being published today.
