= Charles T. Carpenter =

American pioneer banker

- Born: December 9, 1858; Bedford County, Tennessee
- Died: February 22, 1945 (aged 86); Montgomery County, Kansas

Charles Thomas Carpenter (December 9, 1858, in Bedford County, Tennessee – February 22, 1945, in Montgomery County, Kansas) was a banker who was taken hostage by the Dalton Gang in their last raid, October 5, 1892, in Coffeyville, Kansas.

== Early life ==
Carpenter was a son of Samuel and Sarah (Montgomery) Carpenter, of Palmetto, Tennessee. He was schooled in a private institution at Palmetto, and attended Indiana University Bloomington, where he was a member of Phi Kappa Phi and graduated in 1876 with a Bachelor of Arts degree.

== Career ==
After graduation, he moved to Kansas to join his parents at Oswego, Kansas, where he first worked for his father, and then served two years as cashier of Condon Bank. In 1886, he moved to Coffeyville as a partner in the Condon Bank office established at Coffeyville that year. He was also senior partner in the Charles T. Carpenter Insurance Agency, the largest agency in Montgomery County, Kansas. He served as president of the Coffeyville Board of Education and trustee of the Montgomery County High School at Independence, Kansas.

== Family ==
Carpenter married in 1892 at Rockport, Indiana, to Temple West, who was born in Pike County, Indiana. She was a prominent woman of Southern Kansas in religious, social and public affairs, president of the Carnegie Library of Coffeyville, and the first woman honored with a place on the school board of that city. She and her husband were the parents of seven children.

== Dalton Gang robbery ==
When the Dalton Gang attempted to rob two banks in Coffeyville on October 5, 1892, Charles T. Carpenter was taken hostage in his bank. In the gun battle that followed the failed raid, which turned out to be the gang's last, four townspeople were killed, and four gang members were killed and the fifth captured and imprisoned. Carpenter was not physically injured in the affray.
