= Northeast Arkansas League =

- Classification: Class D (1909–1911, 1936–1941)
- Sport: Minor League Baseball
- First season: 1909
- Folded: 1941
- President: R. M. Rider (1909); J.E. Doherty (1910); J.R. Bertig (1910); C. A. Klunk (1911); Joseph R. Bertig (1936–1941)
- No. of teams: 11
- Country: United States of America
- Most titles: 2 Blytheville Giants (1937, 1938); Newport (1936, 1941)
- Related competitions: Arkansas State League

The Northeast Arkansas League was the name used by a pair of American minor league baseball leagues. The first of these started operations in 1909 and continued through 1911. The second version began operations for the 1936 season. It continued through the 1941 season.

== Cities represented ==
- Batesville, AR: Batesville White Sox 1936; Batesville White Sox 1938; Batesville Pilots 1940–1941
- Blytheville, AR: Blytheville 1910; Blytheville Tigers 1911; Blytheville Giants 1937–1938
- Caruthersville, MO: Caruthersville 1910; Caruthersville Pilots 1936–1940
- Helena, AR: Helena Hustlers 1911
- Jonesboro, AR: Jonesboro Zebras 1909–1911; Jonesboro Giants 1936–1938; Jonesboro White Sox 1939–1941
- Marianna, AR: Marianna Brickeys 1909
- Newport, AR: Newport Cardinals 1936–1938; Newport Canners 1939; Newport Dodgers 1940–1941
- Osceola, AR: Osceola Indians 1936–1937
- Newport, AR: Newport Pearl Diggers 1909
- Paragould, AR: Paragould Scouts 1909–1911; Paragould Rebels 1936–1938; Paragould Browns 1939–1940; Paragould Broncos 1941
- West Plains, MO: West Plains Badgers 1936

== Yearly standings ==
=== 1909 ===
The teams from Jonesboro, Arkansas and Newport, Arkansas left the Arkansas State League and joined. New teams were added in Marianna, Arkansas and Paragould, Arkansas.

Team Name	Affiliation	Record
Jonesboro Zebras		30-23
Newport Pearl Diggers		29-25
Marianna Brickeys		24-29
Paragould Scouts		24-30

=== 1910 ===
The teams in Marianna and Newport folded. New teams in Blytheville, Arkansas and Caruthersville, Missouri came into the league.

Caruthersville	68-48 (1st half winner)
Paragould Scouts	65-46 (2nd half winner)
Jonesboro Zebras	53-55
Blytheville	38-75

=== 1911 ===
The Caruthersville team folded. A new team from Helena, Arkansas came into the league.

Helena	37-29
Blytheville	31-30
Paragould Scouts	28-32
Jonesboro Zebras	28-33

The league, and all teams in it, folded.

=== 1936 ===
The league formed with new teams starting in Batesville, Arkansas, Jonesboro, Arkansas, Newport, Arkansas, Osceola, Arkansas, Paragould, Arkansas, and West Plains, Missouri. The West Plains team moved to Caruthersville, Missouri on June 11. Its record was 18-10 before the move, and 33-38 after it.

Team Name	Affiliation	Record
Newport Cardinals	St. Louis Cardinals	67-30
Osceola Indians		58-37
Jonesboro Giants		50-46
West Plains Badgers/Caruthersville Pilots	St. Louis Cardinals	51-48
Batesville White Sox		34-64
Paragould Rebels		31-66

=== 1937 ===
Batesville folded. A new team formed in Blytheville, Arkansas.

Blytheville Giants	New York Giants	62-45 (1st half winner) (2nd half winner)
Caruthersville Pilots	St. Louis Cardinals	59-47
Jonesboro Giants		56-53
Newport Cardinals	St. Louis Cardinals	53-55
Osceola Indians	St. Louis Browns	49-60
Paragould Rebels	Memphis Chicks	44-63

As Blytheville won both half of the season, it was determined to be the winner.

=== 1938 ===
Osceola folded. A new team in Batesville, Arkansas formed.

Blytheville Giants	New York Giants	70-35
Caruthersville Pilots	St. Louis Cardinals	62-42
Newport Cardinals		61-46
Paragould Rebels	Memphis Chicks	52-56
Batesville White Sox	Chicago White Sox	47-62
Jonesboro Giants		28-79

=== 1939 ===
The teams in Batesville and Blytheville folded.

Caruthersville Pilots	St. Louis Cardinals	79-39 (1st half winner) (2nd half winner)
Paragould Broncos	St. Louis Browns	63-57
Newport Tigers	Detroit Tigers	61-60
Jonesboro White Sox	Chicago White Sox	38-85

As Caruthersville won both halves of the season, there was no basis for a playoff.

=== 1940 ===
Caruthersville moved to Batesville, Arkansas on July 7.

Paragould Browns	St. Louis Browns	73-48 (2nd half winner)
Jonesboro White Sox	Chicago White Sox	67-54
Newport Dodgers	Brooklyn Dodgers	56-68
Caruthersville Pilots/ Batesville Pilots	St. Louis Cardinals	47-73

=== 1941 ===
Newport Dodgers	Brooklyn Dodgers	71-46 (1st half winner) (2nd half winner)
Batesville Pilots	St. Louis Cardinals	65-56
Jonesboro White Sox	Chicago White Sox	53-61
Paragould Browns	St. Louis Browns	48-69

All teams and the league itself folded.
