= Blytheville Giants =

- 1910–1938; (1910–1911, 1925–1926, 1937–1938); Blytheville, Arkansas

Minor league affiliations
- Previous classes: Class D
- League: Northeast Arkansas League (1937–1938)
- Previous leagues: Tri-State League (1925–1926); Northeast Arkansas League (1910–1911)

Major league affiliations
- Previous teams: New York Giants (1937–1938)

Minor league titles
- League titles: 1937, 1938

Team data
- Previous names: Blytheville Giants (1937–1938); Blytheville Tigers (1925–1926); Blytheville (1910–1911)
- Previous parks: Municipal Park

The Blytheville Giants, based in Blytheville, Arkansas played in the Northeast Arkansas League in 1937 and 1938 as an affiliate of the New York Giants. They won the league title both years with a 62–45 record in 1937 and 70–35 record in 1938.

Previously a Blytheville team played in the same league in 1910–1911 and the Blytheville Tigers played in the Tri-State League in 1925 and 1926.

== Notable players ==
- Harry Feldman (1919–1962), pitcher
