= Batesville White Sox =

- 1936–1938; (1936, 1938); Batesville, Arkansas

Minor league affiliations
- Previous classes: Class D
- League: Northeast Arkansas League

Major league affiliations
- Previous teams: St. Louis Browns (1938)

The Batesville White Sox, based in Batesville, Arkansas played in the Northeast Arkansas League in 1936 and 1938.
