= Newport Dodgers =

- 1909–1941; (1909, 1936–1941); Newport, Arkansas

Minor league affiliations
- Previous classes: Class D (1909, 1936–1941)
- League: Northeast Arkansas League (1909, 1936–1941)

Major league affiliations
- Previous teams: Brooklyn Dodgers (1940–1941); Detroit Tigers (1939); St. Louis Cardinals (1936–1937)

Minor league titles
- League titles: 1 (1941)

Team data
- Previous names: Newport Dodgers (1940–1941); Newport Tigers (1939); Newport Cardinals (1936–1937); Newport Pearl Diggers (1909)
- Previous parks: Mann Field

The Newport Dodgers were a Northeast Arkansas League baseball team based in Newport, Arkansas, USA that played from 1936 to 1941. They were affiliated with the St. Louis Cardinals from 1936 to 1937, the Detroit Tigers in 1939 and the Brooklyn Dodgers in 1940–1941. They played their home games at Mann Field. The Newport Pearl Diggers began Northeast Arkansas League play in 1909.

Pete Reiser and Johnny Sain are the only two known major leaguers to play for the team when it was known as the Cardinals.

== Year-by-year record ==
Year	Record	Finish	Manager	Playoffs
1909	29–25	2nd	Arthur Riggs	none
1936	67–30	1st	Thorpe Hamilton	Lost League Finals
1937	53–55	4th	Thorpe Hamilton	none
1938	61–46	3rd	Thorpe Hamilton / Mike Blazo	Lost League Finals
1939	61–60	3rd	Clarence Harris	none
1940	56–68	3rd	Cliff Greer / Paul Chervinko	
1941	71–46	1st	Merle Settlemire	none League Champs
