= Paragould Browns =

Paragouold Browns
- 1909–1941; (1909–1911, 1936–1941); Paragould, Arkansas

Minor league affiliations
- Previous classes: Class D
- League: Northeast Arkansas League

Major league affiliations
- Previous teams: St. Louis Browns (1939–1941)

Minor league titles
- League titles: 1940

Team data
- Previous names: Paragould Browns (1939–1941); Paragould Rebels (1936–1938); Paragould Scouts (1909–1911)

The Paragould Browns (also known as the Rebels and the Scouts) were a minor league baseball team that represented Paragould, Arkansas in the Northeast Arkansas League from 1909 to 1911 and from 1936 to 1941.
