= Jonesboro White Sox =

Minor league professional baseball team

- 1909–1941; (1909, 1910–1911, 1925–1926, 1936–1941); Jonesboro, Arkansas

Minor league affiliations
- Previous classes: Class D
- League: Northeast Arkansas League (1936–1941)
- Previous leagues: Tri-State League (1925–1926); Northeast Arkansas League (1909–1911); Arkansas State League (1909)

Major league affiliations
- Previous teams: Chicago White Sox (1939–1941)

Minor league titles
- League titles: 1925

Team data
- Previous names: Jonesboro White Sox (1939–1941); Jonesboro Giants (1936–1938); Jonesboro Buffaloes (1925–1926); Jonesboro Zebras (1909–1911); Jonesboro (1909)

The Jonesboro White Sox were a professional baseball team in Minor League Baseball that represented Jonesboro, Arkansas, in the Northeast Arkansas League at different times from 1909 through 1941. The club was known by several other nicknames prior to 1939, when they became a farm team of the Chicago White Sox of Major League Baseball (MLB).
