= 1936 Philadelphia Phillies season =

Major League Baseball season

1936 Philadelphia Phillies
- League: National League
- Ballpark: Baker Bowl
- City: Philadelphia
- Owners: Gerald Nugent
- Managers: Jimmie Wilson
- Radio: WCAU (Bill Dyer); WIP (Dolly Stark)

The 1936 Philadelphia Phillies season was a season in Major League Baseball. The Phillies finished eighth in the National League with a record of 54 wins and 100 losses.

== Offseason ==
- November 21, 1935: Al Todd was traded by the Phillies to the Pittsburgh Pirates for Claude Passeau and Earl Grace.

== Regular season ==
- July 10, 1936: Chuck Klein of the Phillies hit four home runs in a ten inning game against the Pittsburgh Pirates at Forbes Field.

=== Season standings ===
National League
Team	W	L	Pct.	GB	Home	Road
New York Giants	92	62	.597	—	52‍–‍26	40‍–‍36
St. Louis Cardinals	87	67	.565	5	43‍–‍33	44‍–‍34
Chicago Cubs	87	67	.565	5	50‍–‍27	37‍–‍40
Pittsburgh Pirates	84	70	.545	8	46‍–‍30	38‍–‍40
Cincinnati Reds	74	80	.481	18	42‍–‍34	32‍–‍46
Boston Bees	71	83	.461	21	35‍–‍43	36‍–‍40
Brooklyn Dodgers	67	87	.435	25	37‍–‍40	30‍–‍47
Philadelphia Phillies	54	100	.351	38	30‍–‍48	24‍–‍52

=== Record vs. opponents ===
1936 National League record Sources:
Team	BSN	BRO	CHC	CIN	NYG	PHI	PIT	STL
Boston	—	10–12–2	6–16	13–9	9–13	12–10	8–14–1	13–9
Brooklyn	12–10–2	—	7–15	9–13	9–13	12–10	9–13	9–13
Chicago	16–6	15–7	—	10–12	11–11	16–6	10–12	9–13
Cincinnati	9–13	13–9	12–10	—	9–13	13–9	8–14	10–12
New York	13–9	13–9	11–11	13–9	—	17–5	15–7	10–12
Philadelphia	10–12	10–12	6–16	9–13	5–17	—	7–15	7–15
Pittsburgh	14–8–1	13–9	12–10	14–8	7–15	15–7	—	9–13–1
St. Louis	9–13	13–9	13–9	12–10	12–10	15–7	13–9–1	—

=== Notable transactions ===
- May 24, 1936: Johnny Vergez was purchased from the Phillies by the St. Louis Cardinals.

=== Game log ===
Legend
	Phillies win
	Phillies loss
	Postponement
**Bold**	Phillies team member

1936 Game Log
Overall Record: 54–100
April (7–9)

#	Date	Opponent	Score	Win	Loss	Save	Attendance	Record
1	April 14	Bees	4–1	**Curt Davis** (1–0)	Danny MacFayden (0–1)	None	9,000	1–0
2	April 15	Bees	4–12	Ray Benge (1–0)	**Joe Bowman** (0–1)	None	2,000	1–1
3	April 16	Bees	7–5	**Orville Jorgens** (1–0)	Tiny Chaplin (0–1)	**Syl Johnson** (1)	500	2–1
4	April 17	@ Dodgers	3–4 (10)	Fred Frankhouse (1–0)	**Bucky Walters** (0–1)	None	8,000	2–2
5	April 18	@ Dodgers	4–1	**Syl Johnson** (1–0)	Watty Clark (0–1)	None	7,500	3–2
6	April 19	@ Dodgers	1–2	Van Mungo (1–2)	**Curt Davis** (1–1)	None	13,500	3–3
7	April 20	@ Giants	7–6	**Joe Bowman** (1–1)	Slick Castleman (0–1)	None	6,000	4–3
8	April 21	@ Giants	6–7	Harry Gumbert (2–0)	**Curt Davis** (1–2)	None	6,000	4–4
9	April 22	@ Giants	2–7	Carl Hubbell (2–0)	**Euel Moore** (0–1)	None	3,108	4–5
10	April 23	@ Bees	5–3	**Bucky Walters** (1–1)	Bob Brown (0–1)	**Syl Johnson** (2)	3,106	5–5
11	April 24	@ Bees	1–4	Danny MacFayden (1–2)	**Curt Davis** (1–3)	None	9,434	5–6
12	April 25	Dodgers	3–1	**Joe Bowman** (2–1)	Ed Brandt (0–1)	None	6,000	6–6
13	April 26	Dodgers	7–10	Fred Frankhouse (2–0)	**Syl Johnson** (1–1)	Dutch Leonard (1)	5,000	6–7
14	April 28	@ Pirates	9–7	**Syl Johnson** (2–1)	Mace Brown (0–1)	None	2,000	7–7
15	April 29	@ Pirates	9–10 (11)	Red Lucas (1–1)	**Bucky Walters** (1–2)	None	1,000	7–8
16	April 30	@ Pirates	5–6	Jim Weaver (2–1)	**Orville Jorgens** (1–1)	Mace Brown (1)	1,500	7–9

May (11–17)

#	Date	Opponent	Score	Win	Loss	Save	Attendance	Record
17	May 1	@ Reds	3–4	Lee Grissom (1–0)	**Joe Bowman** (2–2)	Lee Stine (1)	1,814	7–10
18	May 2	@ Reds	4–3	**Bucky Walters** (2–2)	Al Hollingsworth (3–1)	**Syl Johnson** (3)	2,972	8–10
19	May 3	@ Cubs	8–5 (12)	**Syl Johnson** (3–1)	Fabian Kowalik (0–1)	None	8,000	9–10
–	May 4	@ Cubs	Postponed (rain, cold weather and wet grounds); Makeup: July 19 as a traditional double-header					
20	May 5	@ Cubs	4–5	Bill Lee (3–1)	**Joe Bowman** (2–3)	None	3,906	9–11
21	May 6	@ Cardinals	2–3	Dizzy Dean (4–1)	**Bucky Walters** (2–3)	None	2,400	9–12
22	May 7	@ Cardinals	2–3	Bill Walker (2–0)	**Orville Jorgens** (1–2)	None	6,776	9–13
23	May 9	Giants	5–3	**Curt Davis** (2–3)	Carl Hubbell (2–3)	None	8,000	10–13
24	May 10	Giants	2–6	Hal Schumacher (2–1)	**Joe Bowman** (2–4)	None	13,000	10–14
25	May 11	Giants	12–13	Harry Gumbert (3–0)	**Claude Passeau** (0–1)	Frank Gabler (1)	5,000	10–15
26	May 12	Reds	4–6	Benny Frey (1–0)	**Orville Jorgens** (1–3)	None	not available	10–16
27	May 13	Reds	9–7	**Syl Johnson** (4–1)	Lee Stine (1–3)	**Tom Zachary** (1)	1,500	11–16
–	May 14	Reds	Postponed (cold weather and rain); Makeup: June 28 as a traditional double-header					
28	May 15	Cubs	11–6	**Euel Moore** (1–1)	Charlie Root (1–2)	None	not available	12–16
29	May 16	Cubs	3–7	Roy Henshaw (1–3)	**Bucky Walters** (2–4)	None	7,500	12–17
30	May 17	Cardinals	3–10	Dizzy Dean (5–2)	**Curt Davis** (2–4)	None	15,000	12–18
31	May 18	Cardinals	6–11	Mike Ryba (2–1)	**Orville Jorgens** (1–4)	Paul Dean (1)	3,000	12–19
–	May 19	Cardinals	Postponed (rain and wet grounds); Makeup: June 25 as a traditional double-header					
32	May 20	Pirates	3–9	Jim Weaver (5–1)	**Tom Zachary** (0–1)	None	1,500	12–20
33	May 21	Pirates	4–7	Ralph Birkofer (3–1)	**Orville Jorgens** (1–5)	None	1,500	12–21
34	May 22	@ Giants	15–0	**Bucky Walters** (3–4)	Freddie Fitzsimmons (0–1)	None	4,468	13–21
35	May 23	@ Giants	0–9	Carl Hubbell (5–3)	**Hal Kelleher** (0–1)	None	13,468	13–22
36	May 24	@ Giants	5–13	Hal Schumacher (5–1)	**Tom Zachary** (0–2)	Frank Gabler (3)	20,000	13–23
37	May 25	@ Giants	0–1	Al Smith (4–2)	**Joe Bowman** (2–5)	None	3,000	13–24
38	May 26	Bees	7–2	**Orville Jorgens** (2–5)	Ray Benge (4–2)	None	2,000	14–24
39	May 27	Bees	5–2	**Bucky Walters** (4–4)	Bobby Reis (1–3)	None	1,500	15–24
40	May 28	Dodgers	10–13	George Jeffcoat (1–1)	**Tom Zachary** (0–3)	Ed Brandt (2)	1,000	15–25
41	May 29	Dodgers	10–2	**Euel Moore** (2–1)	Fred Frankhouse (2–6)	None	2,500	16–25
42	May 30 (1)	@ Bees	5–4 (10)	**Claude Passeau** (1–1)	Johnny Lanning (2–2)	None	see 2nd game	17–25
43	May 30 (2)	@ Bees	9–6	**Joe Bowman** (3–5)	Tiny Chaplin (2–5)	None	24,430	18–25
44	May 31	@ Bees	5–6 (11)	Danny MacFayden (7–5)	**Syl Johnson** (4–2)	None	10,000	18–26

June (4–19)

#	Date	Opponent	Score	Win	Loss	Save	Attendance	Record
45	June 2	@ Reds	8–9	Don Brennan (2–1)	**Joe Bowman** (3–6)	None	19,173	18–27
46	June 4	@ Reds	3–5	Paul Derringer (5–5)	**Hal Kelleher** (0–2)	Don Brennan (4)	1,377	18–28
47	June 5	@ Pirates	8–14	Mace Brown (2–1)	**Joe Bowman** (3–7)	None	1,000	18–29
48	June 6	@ Pirates	5–1	**Orville Jorgens** (3–5)	Jim Weaver (7–3)	None	5,000	19–29
49	June 7	@ Pirates	2–6	Bill Swift (5–3)	**Euel Moore** (2–2)	None	10,000	19–30
50	June 8	@ Cubs	0–3	Larry French (3–1)	**Bucky Walters** (4–5)	None	3,500	19–31
51	June 9	@ Cubs	3–6	Roy Henshaw (4–3)	**Hal Kelleher** (0–3)	None	3,733	19–32
52	June 10	@ Cubs	3–4	Lon Warneke (6–3)	**Fabian Kowalik** (0–3)	None	2,000	19–33
53	June 11	@ Cardinals	12–4	**Claude Passeau** (2–1)	Les Munns (0–2)	None	2,350	20–33
54	June 12	@ Cardinals	2–3 (11)	Roy Parmelee (6–5)	**Bucky Walters** (4–6)	None	2,000	20–34
55	June 13	@ Cardinals	1–7	Dizzy Dean (12–2)	**Hal Kelleher** (0–4)	None	4,986	20–35
56	June 14	@ Cardinals	10–12	Bill Walker (4–2)	**Claude Passeau** (2–2)	Dizzy Dean (2)	10,200	20–36
57	June 16	Cubs	1–4	Larry French (4–1)	**Fabian Kowalik** (0–4)	None	2,500	20–37
58	June 17	Cubs	3–5	Lon Warneke (8–3)	**Bucky Walters** (4–7)	Larry French (1)	2,500	20–38
–	June 18	Cubs	Postponed (wet grounds and rain); Makeup: July 26 as a traditional double-header					
–	June 19	Pirates	Postponed (wet grounds and rain); Makeup: June 20 as a traditional double-header					
59	June 20 (1)	Pirates	0–6	Cy Blanton (5–4)	**Joe Bowman** (3–8)	None	see 2nd game	20–39
60	June 20 (2)	Pirates	2–1	**Orville Jorgens** (4–5)	Jim Weaver (8–5)	**Syl Johnson** (4)	8,000	21–39
61	June 21	Pirates	6–7	Red Lucas (5–1)	**Fabian Kowalik** (0–5)	None	5,000	21–40
62	June 22	Cardinals	6–8	Jesse Haines (1–0)	**Claude Passeau** (2–3)	Dizzy Dean (3)	2,500	21–41
63	June 23	Cardinals	2–3	Ed Heusser (2–1)	**Joe Bowman** (3–9)	Dizzy Dean (4)	2,500	21–42
–	June 24	Cardinals	Postponed (wet grounds and rain); Makeup: August 2 as a traditional double-header					
64	June 25 (1)	Cardinals	13–4	**Fabian Kowalik** (1–5)	Dizzy Dean (13–3)	**Syl Johnson** (5)	see 2nd game	22–42
65	June 25 (2)	Cardinals	4–13	Jesse Haines (2–0)	**Orville Jorgens** (4–6)	None	14,000	22–43
66	June 26	Reds	6–11	Al Hollingsworth (8–4)	**Bucky Walters** (4–8)	None	2,500	22–44
67	June 27	Reds	9–10	Don Brennan (4–1)	**Syl Johnson** (4–3)	Paul Derringer (2)	1,500	22–45
–	June 28 (1)	Reds	Postponed (rain); Makeup: July 29 as a traditional double-header					
–	June 28 (2)	Reds	Postponed (rain); Makeup: July 31 as a traditional double-header					
–	June 30	@ Dodgers	Postponed (wet grounds and rain); Makeup: July 1 as a traditional double-header					

July (16–13)

#	Date	Opponent	Score	Win	Loss	Save	Attendance	Record
68	July 1 (1)	@ Dodgers	1–6	Van Mungo (8–10)	**Fabian Kowalik** (1–6)	None	see 2nd game	22–46
69	July 1 (2)	@ Dodgers	10–3	**Orville Jorgens** (5–6)	Ed Brandt (3–7)	**Syl Johnson** (6)	10,000	23–46
70	July 2	@ Dodgers	5–0	**Bucky Walters** (5–8)	Fred Frankhouse (4–7)	None	797	24–46
71	July 4 (1)	Dodgers	9–5	**Joe Bowman** (4–9)	Ed Brandt (3–8)	**Euel Moore** (1)	see 2nd game	25–46
72	July 4 (2)	Dodgers	4–0	**Claude Passeau** (3–3)	Watty Clark (3–8)	None	15,000	26–46
73	July 5	Bees	7–6	**Orville Jorgens** (6–6)	Ray Benge (6–7)	**Claude Passeau** (1)	not available	27–46
–	July 7	**1936 Major League Baseball All-Star Game at National League Park in Boston**						
74	July 9	@ Pirates	5–16	Ralph Birkofer (4–3)	**Fabian Kowalik** (1–7)	None	3,500	27–47
75	July 10	@ Pirates	9–6 (10)	**Bucky Walters** (6–8)	Bill Swift (8–6)	None	2,500	28–47
–	July 11	@ Pirates	Postponed (rain); Makeup: September 2 as a traditional double-header					
76	July 12 (1)^{^{[a]}}	@ Reds	4–0	**Joe Bowman** (5–9)	Paul Derringer (11–10)	**Claude Passeau** (2)	see 2nd game	29–47
77	July 12 (2)^{^{[a]}}	@ Reds	3–4 (11)	Don Brennan (5–1)	**Claude Passeau** (3–4)	None	4,018	29–48
78	July 13	@ Reds	4–6	Benny Frey (3–1)	**Bucky Walters** (6–9)	Peaches Davis (1)	600	29–49
79	July 14	@ Reds	9–8	**Pete Sivess** (1–0)	Bill Hallahan (3–4)	None	747	30–49
80	July 15	@ Cardinals	5–4	**Claude Passeau** (4–4)	Ed Heusser (4–2)	**Syl Johnson** (7)	13,854	31–49
81	July 16	@ Cardinals	6–2	**Claude Passeau** (5–4)	Dizzy Dean (14–6)	None	1,800	32–49
82	July 17	@ Cardinals	4–5	Dizzy Dean (15–6)	**Syl Johnson** (4–4)	None	1,800	32–50
83	July 18	@ Cubs	6–8	Larry French (9–1)	**Orville Jorgens** (6–7)	None	7,000	32–51
84	July 19 (1)	@ Cubs	1–2 (11)	Bill Lee (10–5)	**Bucky Walters** (6–10)	None	see 2nd game	32–52
85	July 19 (2)	@ Cubs	4–1	**Claude Passeau** (6–4)	Tex Carleton (9–4)	None	29,540	33–52
86	July 21	Pirates	6–17	Bill Swift (9–8)	**Euel Moore** (2–3)	None	2,500	33–53
87	July 22	Pirates	16–4	**Joe Bowman** (6–9)	Mace Brown (5–6)	None	not available	34–53
88	July 23	Pirates	1–10	Cy Blanton (7–8)	**Claude Passeau** (6–5)	None	2,500	34–54
–	July 24	Pirates	Postponed (rain); Makeup: September 13 as a traditional double-header					
89	July 25	Cubs	4–17	Curt Davis (10–8)	**Bucky Walters** (6–11)	None	6,000	34–55
90	July 26 (1)	Cubs	4–0	**Bucky Walters** (7–11)	Larry French (10–2)	None	see 2nd game	35–55
91	July 26 (2)	Cubs	5–18	Lon Warneke (11–6)	**Joe Bowman** (6–10)	None	20,000	35–56
–	July 27	Cubs	Postponed (wet grounds, rain, threatening weather); Makeup: September 9 as a traditional double-header					
92	July 28	Cubs	5–3	**Claude Passeau** (7–5)	Larry French (10–3)	None	4,000	36–56
–	July 29 (1)	Reds	Postponed (wet grounds and rain); Makeup: July 30 as a traditional double-header					
–	July 29 (2)	Reds	Postponed (wet grounds and rain); Makeup: September 12 as a traditional double-header					
93	July 30 (1)	Reds	0–5	Bill Hallahan (4–5)	**Joe Bowman** (6–11)	None	see 2nd game	36–57
94	July 30 (2)	Reds	5–4	**Ray Benge** (8–9)	Al Hollingsworth (9–5)	**Claude Passeau** (3)	4,500	37–57
95	July 31 (1)	Reds	2–12	Peaches Davis (2–3)	**Bucky Walters** (7–12)	None	see 2nd game	37–58
96	July 31 (2)	Reds	7–2	**Orville Jorgens** (7–7)	Don Brennan (5–2)	**Joe Bowman** (1)	5,000	38–58

August (4–24)

#	Date	Opponent	Score	Win	Loss	Save	Attendance	Record
97	August 1	Cardinals	11–3	**Claude Passeau** (8–5)	Roy Parmelee (9–7)	None	10,000	39–58
98	August 2 (1)	Cardinals	4–13	Jesse Haines (6–1)	**Bucky Walters** (7–13)	None	see 2nd game	39–59
99	August 2 (2)	Cardinals	8–11	George Earnshaw (6–10)	**Joe Bowman** (6–12)	Dizzy Dean (7)	25,000	39–60
100	August 4	Dodgers	5–6	Watty Clark (7–11)	**Joe Bowman** (6–13)	Max Butcher (2)	2,000	39–61
101	August 5	Dodgers	3–7	Ed Brandt (6–11)	**Claude Passeau** (8–6)	None	1,200	39–62
–	August 6	Dodgers	Postponed (rain and wet grounds); Makeup: September 5 as a traditional double-header					
102	August 7	Giants	3–9	Al Smith (11–8)	**Bucky Walters** (7–14)	Dick Coffman (3)	6,000	39–63
103	August 8	Giants	2–3	Carl Hubbell (16–6)	**Joe Bowman** (6–14)	None	5,000	39–64
104	August 9	Giants	2–6	Slick Castleman (3–7)	**Claude Passeau** (8–7)	None	7,000	39–65
105	August 10	Bees	7–9	Bill Weir (1–0)	**Claude Passeau** (8–8)	Bob Smith (7)	1,000	39–66
106	August 11	Bees	4–5 (10)	Bobby Reis (5–5)	**Syl Johnson** (4–5)	None	not available	39–67
107	August 12	Bees	2–4	Guy Bush (2–4)	**Pete Sivess** (1–1)	None	not available	39–68
108	August 13	@ Giants	4–6	Al Smith (12–8)	**Joe Bowman** (6–15)	None	18,000	39–69
109	August 14	@ Giants	0–3	Slick Castleman (4–7)	**Claude Passeau** (8–9)	None	5,000	39–70
110	August 15	@ Giants	1–4	Carl Hubbell (17–6)	**Bucky Walters** (7–15)	None	8,000	39–71
111	August 16	@ Giants	3–6	Hal Schumacher (9–9)	**Ray Benge** (8–10)	Dick Coffman (4)	15,000	39–72
112	August 18	@ Bees	7–0	**Claude Passeau** (9–9)	Johnny Lanning (3–10)	None	1,700	40–72
113	August 19	@ Bees	1–9	Tiny Chaplin (7–11)	**Bucky Walters** (7–16)	None	1,800	40–73
114	August 20	@ Bees	1–3	Bobby Reis (6–5)	**Joe Bowman** (6–16)	None	1,500	40–74
115	August 22	@ Dodgers	3–12	Ed Brandt (7–11)	**Claude Passeau** (9–10)	None	3,000	40–75
116	August 23 (1)^{^{[b]}}	@ Dodgers	5–6	George Jeffcoat (5–3)	**Claude Passeau** (9–11)	Watty Clark (2)	see 2nd game	40–76
117	August 23 (2)^{^{[b]}}	@ Dodgers	5–3	**Bucky Walters** (8–16)	Van Mungo (12–16)	None	12,000	41–76
–	August 25	@ Cubs	Postponed (rain); Makeup: August 26 as a traditional double-header					
118	August 26 (1)	@ Cubs	2–4	Bill Lee (14–8)	**Claude Passeau** (9–12)	None	see 2nd game	41–77
119	August 26 (2)	@ Cubs	4–7	Larry French (16–5)	**Joe Bowman** (6–17)	None	10,000	41–78
120	August 27	@ Cubs	0–1	Roy Henshaw (6–4)	**Syl Johnson** (4–6)	None	not available	41–79
121	August 28	@ Cardinals	8–0	**Bucky Walters** (9–16)	Cotton Pippen (0–1)	None	1,500	42–79
122	August 29	@ Cardinals	3–12	Si Johnson (3–2)	**Ray Benge** (8–11)	None	2,700	42–80
123	August 30 (1)^{^{[c]}}	@ Reds	3–6	Paul Derringer (16–17)	**Joe Bowman** (6–18)	None	see 2nd game	42–81
124	August 30 (2)^{^{[c]}}	@ Reds	3–4	Peaches Davis (5–6)	**Syl Johnson** (4–7)	None	7,754	42–82

September (12–18)

#	Date	Opponent	Score	Win	Loss	Save	Attendance	Record
125	September 1	@ Reds	2–3	Benny Frey (9–5)	**Bucky Walters** (9–17)	None	1,074	42–83
–	September 2 (1)	@ Pirates	Postponed (rain); Makeup: September 3 as a traditional double-header					
–	September 2 (2)	@ Pirates	Postponed (rain); Makeup: September 14 as a traditional double-header in Philadelphia					
126	September 3 (1)	@ Pirates	4–3	**Joe Bowman** (7–18)	Red Lucas (12–4)	None	see 2nd game	43–83
127	September 3 (2)	@ Pirates	1–5	Waite Hoyt (5–3)	**Claude Passeau** (9–13)	None	5,000	43–84
128	September 5 (1)	Dodgers	2–3	Ed Brandt (9–12)	**Bucky Walters** (9–18)	None	see 2nd game	43–85
129	September 5 (2)	Dodgers	3–4 (12)	Max Butcher (5–4)	**Claude Passeau** (9–14)	None	6,000	43–86
130	September 6	Dodgers	7–5	**Pete Sivess** (2–1)	George Jeffcoat (5–4)	None	3,000	44–86
131	September 7 (1)	Giants	2–6	Carl Hubbell (22–6)	**Joe Bowman** (7–19)	None	see 2nd game	44–87
132	September 7 (2)	Giants	11–14	Dick Coffman (7–5)	**Bucky Walters** (9–19)	None	23,000	44–88
133	September 9 (1)	Cubs	3–10	Larry French (18–6)	**Ray Benge** (8–12)	None	see 2nd game	44–89
134	September 9 (2)	Cubs	5–4 (12)	**Pete Sivess** (3–1)	Tex Carleton (13–10)	None	not available	45–89
135	September 10	Cubs	2–3	Bill Lee (15–11)	**Bucky Walters** (9–20)	None	not available	45–90
136	September 11	Reds	9–6	**Syl Johnson** (5–7)	Bill Hallahan (6–9)	None	500	46–90
137	September 12 (1)	Reds	7–1	**Claude Passeau** (10–14)	Peaches Davis (7–7)	**Ray Benge** (1)	see 2nd game	47–90
138	September 12 (2)	Reds	7–2	**Joe Bowman** (8–19)	Al Hollingsworth (9–9)	None	4,000	48–90
139	September 13 (1)	Pirates	3–5	Ralph Birkofer (7–5)	**Pete Sivess** (3–2)	Cy Blanton (3)	see 2nd game	48–91
140	September 13 (2)	Pirates	4–3	**Orville Jorgens** (8–7)	Mace Brown (9–10)	None	7,500	49–91
141	September 14 (1)	Pirates	4–11	Bill Swift (15–15)	**Ray Benge** (8–13)	None	see 2nd game	49–92
142	September 14 (2)	Pirates	5–6 (10)	Red Lucas (13–4)	**Joe Bowman** (8–20)	None	1,000	49–93
–	September 15	Cardinals	Postponed (rain); Makeup: September 16 as a traditional double-header					
143	September 16 (1)	Cardinals	7–3	**Bucky Walters** (10–20)	Jesse Haines (7–5)	None	see 2nd game	50–93
144	September 16 (2)	Cardinals	2–5	Si Johnson (5–3)	**Claude Passeau** (10–15)	Dizzy Dean (10)	5,000	50–94
145	September 19	@ Bees	0–5	Bill Weir (3–3)	**Pete Sivess** (3–3)	None	2,274	50–95
146	September 20 (1)^{^{[d]}}	@ Bees	3–5	Danny MacFayden (17–12)	**Orville Jorgens** (8–8)	None	see 2nd game	50–96
147	September 20 (2)^{^{[d]}}	@ Bees	5–6	Bob Smith (6–7)	**Hugh Mulcahy** (0–1)	None	7,000	50–97
–	September 21	Giants	Postponed (wet grounds and rain); Makeup: September 22 as a traditional double-header					
148	September 22 (1)	Giants	11–7	**Joe Bowman** (9–20)	Al Smith (14–12)	None	see 2nd game	51–97
149	September 22 (2)	Giants	6–2	**Bucky Walters** (11–20)	Frank Gabler (9–7)	None	4,000	52–97
150	September 23	Giants	4–5	Carl Hubbell (26–6)	**Pete Sivess** (3–4)	None	2,500	52–98
151	September 24 (1)^{^{[e]}}	@ Dodgers	4–2 (13)	**Hugh Mulcahy** (1–1)	Hank Winston (1–3)	None	see 2nd game	53–98
152	September 24 (2)^{^{[e]}}	@ Dodgers	2–4 (7)	Harry Eisenstat (1–2)	**Hal Kelleher** (0–5)	None	1,700	53–99
153	September 27 (1)^{^{[f]}}	Bees	3–7	Guy Bush (5–8)	**Bucky Walters** (11–21)	None	see 2nd game	53–100
154	September 27 (2)^{^{[f]}}	Bees	4–3	**Claude Passeau** (11–15)	Ben Cantwell (9–9)	None	5,000	54–100

^{^[a]}The original schedule indicated single games on June 3 and July 12 at Cincinnati which became a double-header on July 12.
^{^[b]}The original schedule indicated single games on August 21 and 23 at Brooklyn which became a double-header on August 23.
^{^[c]}The original schedule indicated single games on August 30 and 31 at Cincinnati which became a double-header on August 30.
^{^[d]}The original schedule indicated single games on September 21 and 23 at Boston which became a double-header on September 23.
^{^[e]}The original schedule indicated single games on September 24 and 25 at Brooklyn which became a double-header on September 24.
^{^[f]}The original schedule indicated single games on September 26 and 27 with Boston which became a double-header on September 27.

=== Roster ===
1936 Philadelphia Phillies
**Roster**
**Pitchers**: 23 Ray Benge; -- Lefty Bertrand; 46 Joe Bowman; -- Elmer Burkart; 42 Curt Davis; 43 Herb Harris; 47 Syl Johnson; 44 Orville Jorgens; 43 Hal Kelleher; 42 Fabian Kowalik; 45 Euel Moore; 42 Hugh Mulcahy; 48 Claude Passeau; -- Pretzel Pezzullo; 41 Pete Sivess; 40 Bucky Walters; 41 Tom Zachary	**Catchers**: 11 Bill Atwood; 10 Earl Grace; 12 Jimmy Wilson; **Infielders**: 24 Dolph Camilli; 32 Gene Corbett; 22 Chile Gómez; 25 Mickey Haslin; 21 Leo Norris; 20 Chuck Sheerin; 20 Stan Sperry; 23 Johnny Vergez; 25 Pinky Whitney	**Outfielders**: 30 Ethan Allen; 34 Morrie Arnovich; 30 Walt Bashore; 34 Lou Chiozza; 32,36 Chuck Klein; 33 Johnny Moore; 37 Ernie Sulik; -- George Watkins; **Other batters**: -- Joe Holden	**Manager**: 12 Jimmy Wilson; **Coaches**: 50 Hans Lobert; 51 Dick Spalding

== Player stats ==
= Indicates team leader

=== Batting ===
==== Starters by position ====
Note: Pos = Position; G = Games played; AB = At bats; H = Hits; Avg. = Batting average; HR = Home runs; RBI = Runs batted in

Pos	Player	G	AB	H	Avg.	HR	RBI
C	Earl Grace	86	221	55	.249	4	32
1B	Dolph Camilli	151	530	167	.315	28	102
2B	Chile Gómez	108	332	77	.232	0	28
SS	Leo Norris	154	581	154	.265	11	76
3B	Pinky Whitney	114	411	121	.294	6	59
OF	Chuck Klein	117	492	152	.309	20	86
OF	Ernie Sulik	122	404	116	.287	6	36
OF	Johnny Moore	124	475	155	.328	16	68

==== Other batters ====
Note: G = Games played; AB = At bats; H = Hits; Avg. = Batting average; HR = Home runs; RBI = Runs batted in

Player	G	AB	H	Avg.	HR	RBI
Lou Chiozza	144	572	170	.297	1	48
Jimmie Wilson	85	230	64	.278	1	27
Bill Atwood	71	192	58	.302	2	29
Ethan Allen	30	125	37	.296	1	9
Chuck Sheerin	36	72	19	.264	0	4
George Watkins	19	70	17	.243	2	5
Mickey Haslin	16	64	22	.344	0	6
Morrie Arnovich	13	48	15	.313	1	7
Johnny Vergez	15	40	11	.275	1	5
Stan Sperry	20	37	5	.135	0	4
Gene Corbett	6	21	3	.143	0	2
Walt Bashore	10	10	2	.200	0	0
Joe Holden	1	1	0	.000	0	0

=== Pitching ===
= Indicates league leader

==== Starting pitchers ====
Note: G = Games pitched; IP = Innings pitched; W = Wins; L = Losses; ERA = Earned run average; SO = Strikeouts

Player	G	IP	W	L	ERA	SO
Bucky Walters	40	258.0	11	21	4.26	66
Joe Bowman	40	203.2	9	20	5.04	80
Curt Davis	10	60.1	2	4	4.62	18
Elmer Burkart	2	7.2	0	0	3.52	2

==== Other pitchers ====
Note: G = Games pitched; IP = Innings pitched; W = Wins; L = Losses; ERA = Earned run average; SO = Strikeouts

Player	G	IP	W	L	ERA	SO
Claude Passeau	49	217.1	11	15	3.48	85
Orville Jorgens	39	167.1	8	8	4.79	58
Syl Johnson	39	111.0	5	7	4.30	48
Fabian Kowalik	22	77.0	1	5	5.38	19
Pete Sivess	17	65.0	3	4	4.57	22
Euel Moore	20	54.1	2	3	6.96	19
Ray Benge	15	45.2	1	4	4.73	13
Hal Kelleher	14	44.0	0	5	5.32	13
Hugh Mulcahy	3	22.2	1	1	3.18	2
Tom Zachary	7	20.1	0	3	7.97	8

==== Relief pitchers ====
Note: G = Games pitched; W = Wins; L = Losses; SV = Saves; ERA = Earned run average; SO = Strikeouts

Player	G	W	L	SV	ERA	SO
Herb Harris	4	0	0	0	10.29	0
Pretzel Pezzullo	1	0	0	0	4.50	0
Lefty Bertrand	1	0	0	0	9.00	1

== Farm system ==
Level	Team	League	Manager
A	Hazleton Mountaineers	New York–Pennsylvania League	Andy High and Frank Uzmann
