= 1936 Pittsburgh Pirates season =

1936 Pittsburgh Pirates
- League: National League
- Ballpark: Forbes Field
- City: Pittsburgh
- Owners: Bill Benswanger
- Managers: Pie Traynor
- Radio: KQV; Tony Wakeman; WJAS; Regis Welsh; WWSW; Jack Craddock

The 1936 Pittsburgh Pirates season was the 55th season of the Pittsburgh Pirates franchise; the 50th in the National League. The Pirates finished fourth in the league standings with a record of 84–70.

== Offseason ==
- November 21, 1935: Claude Passeau and Earl Grace were traded by the Pirates to the Philadelphia Phillies for Al Todd.
- December 12, 1935: Tommy Thevenow was purchased from the Pirates by the Cincinnati Reds.

== Regular season ==
- July 10, 1936: Chuck Klein of the Philadelphia Phillies hit four home runs in a ten inning game against the Pirates at Forbes Field.

=== Season standings ===
National League
Team	W	L	Pct.	GB	Home	Road
New York Giants	92	62	.597	—	52‍–‍26	40‍–‍36
St. Louis Cardinals	87	67	.565	5	43‍–‍33	44‍–‍34
Chicago Cubs	87	67	.565	5	50‍–‍27	37‍–‍40
Pittsburgh Pirates	84	70	.545	8	46‍–‍30	38‍–‍40
Cincinnati Reds	74	80	.481	18	42‍–‍34	32‍–‍46
Boston Bees	71	83	.461	21	35‍–‍43	36‍–‍40
Brooklyn Dodgers	67	87	.435	25	37‍–‍40	30‍–‍47
Philadelphia Phillies	54	100	.351	38	30‍–‍48	24‍–‍52

=== Record vs. opponents ===
1936 National League record Sources:
Team	BSN	BRO	CHC	CIN	NYG	PHI	PIT	STL
Boston	—	10–12–2	6–16	13–9	9–13	12–10	8–14–1	13–9
Brooklyn	12–10–2	—	7–15	9–13	9–13	12–10	9–13	9–13
Chicago	16–6	15–7	—	10–12	11–11	16–6	10–12	9–13
Cincinnati	9–13	13–9	12–10	—	9–13	13–9	8–14	10–12
New York	13–9	13–9	11–11	13–9	—	17–5	15–7	10–12
Philadelphia	10–12	10–12	6–16	9–13	5–17	—	7–15	7–15
Pittsburgh	14–8–1	13–9	12–10	14–8	7–15	15–7	—	9–13–1
St. Louis	9–13	13–9	13–9	12–10	12–10	15–7	13–9–1	—

=== Game log ===
1936 Game Log: 84–70 (Home: 46–30; Away: 38–40)
April: 6–6 (Home: 3–2; Away: 3–4)

#	Date	Opponent	Score	Win	Loss	Save	Attendance	Record
1	April 14	@ Reds	8–6	**Hoyt** (1–0)	Derringer	—	32,243	1–0
2	April 15	@ Reds	7–6	**Birkofer** (1–0)	Freitas	—	2,868	2–0
3	April 16	@ Reds	4–7	Hollingsworth	**Weaver** (0–1)	—	1,836	2–1
4	April 19	Cardinals	3–7	Hallahan	**Lucas** (0–1)	—	17,500	2–2
5	April 20	Cubs	9–8	**Swift** (1–0)	Henshaw	—	—	3–2
6	April 23	@ Cubs	1–2	French	**Birkofer** (1–1)	—	—	3–3
7	April 24	@ Cubs	1–6	Warneke	**Blanton** (0–1)	—	—	3–4
8	April 25	@ Cardinals	12–5	**Weaver** (1–1)	Hallahan	—	—	4–4
9	April 26	@ Cardinals	2–3 (10)	Dean	**Swift** (1–1)	—	5,500	4–5
10	April 28	Phillies	7–9	Johnson	**Brown** (0–1)	—	—	4–6
11	April 29	Phillies	10–9 (11)	**Lucas** (1–1)	Walters	—	—	5–6
12	April 30	Phillies	6–5	**Weaver** (2–1)	Jorgens	**Brown** (1)	—	6–6

May: 15–14 (Home: 6–4; Away: 9–10)

#	Date	Opponent	Score	Win	Loss	Save	Attendance	Record
13	May 1	Bees	4–6	Osborne	**Swift** (1–2)	Smith	2,000	6–7
14	May 2	Bees	6–1	**Tising** (1–0)	Chaplin	—	5,000	7–7
15	May 3	Dodgers	6–5	**Hoyt** (2–0)	Mungo	—	10,000	8–7
16	May 5	Dodgers	4–0	**Weaver** (3–1)	Clark	—	1,600	9–7
17	May 6	Giants	5–6 (10)	Gabler	**Hoyt** (2–1)	—	—	9–8
18	May 7	Giants	6–2	**Birkofer** (2–1)	Castleman	—	10,000	10–8
19	May 8	Reds	9–6	**Swift** (2–2)	Stine	**Blanton** (1)	—	11–8
20	May 9	Reds	10–6	**Blanton** (1–1)	Brennan	—	—	12–8
21	May 10	Reds	0–6	Derringer	**Tising** (1–1)	—	13,955	12–9
22	May 12	@ Bees	6–6 (10)			—	2,000	12–9
23	May 13	@ Bees	3–4 (10)	MacFayden	**Hoyt** (2–2)	—	2,500	12–10
24	May 14	@ Bees	5–2	**Bush** (1–0)	Benge	—	1,600	13–10
25	May 15	@ Dodgers	6–2	**Weaver** (4–1)	Mungo	—	4,000	14–10
26	May 16	@ Dodgers	0–3	Clark	**Blanton** (1–2)	—	8,000	14–11
27	May 17	@ Giants	6–8	Castleman	**Bush** (1–1)	Gabler	29,000	14–12
28	May 18	@ Giants	2–4	Hubbell	**Tising** (1–2)	—	—	14–13
29	May 20	@ Phillies	9–3	**Weaver** (5–1)	Zachary	—	—	15–13
30	May 21	@ Phillies	7–4	**Birkofer** (3–1)	Jorgens	—	—	16–13
31	May 22	Cardinals	4–11	Dean	**Tising** (1–3)	—	—	16–14
32	May 23	@ Reds	3–4	Brennan	**Blanton** (1–3)	—	—	16–15
33	May 24	@ Reds	1–12	Hollingsworth	**Weaver** (5–2)	—	11,526	16–16
34	May 25	@ Reds	9–2	**Lucas** (2–1)	Schott	—	1,869	17–16
35	May 26	@ Cardinals	2–6	Dean	**Blanton** (1–4)	—	—	17–17
36	May 26	@ Cardinals	2–6	Winford	**Birkofer** (3–2)	—	—	17–18
37	May 27	@ Cardinals	11–2	**Swift** (3–2)	Hallahan	—	—	18–18
38	May 28	@ Cardinals	7–2	**Weaver** (6–2)	Walker	—	—	19–18
39	May 29	@ Cardinals	7–9	Dean	**Bush** (1–2)	—	—	19–19
40	May 30	@ Cubs	7–5	**Swift** (4–2)	Root	—	—	20–19
41	May 30	@ Cubs	11–7	**Brown** (1–1)	Bryant	**Bush** (1)	43,332	21–19
42	May 31	@ Cubs	7–8 (10)	Carleton	**Bush** (1–3)	—	—	21–20

June: 17–11 (Home: 10–5; Away: 7–6)

#	Date	Opponent	Score	Win	Loss	Save	Attendance	Record
43	June 2	Bees	5–4	**Weaver** (7–2)	Chaplin	**Brown** (2)	2,500	22–20
44	June 3	Bees	3–4 (11)	Reis	**Swift** (4–3)	—	2,000	22–21
45	June 4	Bees	7–5	**Blanton** (2–4)	Lanning	**Brown** (3)	—	23–21
46	June 5	Phillies	14–8	**Brown** (2–1)	Bowman	—	—	24–21
47	June 6	Phillies	1–5	Jorgens	**Weaver** (7–3)	—	—	24–22
48	June 7	Phillies	6–2	**Swift** (5–3)	Moore	—	—	25–22
49	June 8	Dodgers	2–1	**Blanton** (3–4)	Brandt	—	—	26–22
50	June 9	Dodgers	4–1	**Weaver** (8–3)	Earnshaw	—	—	27–22
51	June 9	Dodgers	7–5	**Brown** (3–1)	Mungo	—	8,000	28–22
52	June 10	Dodgers	6–3	**Lucas** (3–1)	Clark	**Bush** (2)	—	29–22
53	June 12	Giants	3–2	**Swift** (6–3)	Hubbell	—	—	30–22
54	June 13	Giants	6–2	**Blanton** (4–4)	Smith	—	—	31–22
55	June 14	Giants	0–8	Schumacher	**Weaver** (8–4)	—	32,000	31–23
56	June 16	@ Dodgers	9–2	**Lucas** (4–1)	Mungo	—	3,500	32–23
57	June 17	@ Dodgers	14–5	**Swift** (7–3)	Baker	—	—	33–23
58	June 20	@ Phillies	6–0	**Blanton** (5–4)	Bowman	—	—	34–23
59	June 20	@ Phillies	1–2	Jorgens	**Weaver** (8–5)	Johnson	—	34–24
60	June 21	@ Phillies	7–6	**Lucas** (5–1)	Kowalik	—	5,000	35–24
61	June 22	@ Giants	5–11	Schumacher	**Swift** (7–4)	—	5,314	35–25
62	June 23	@ Giants	2–3	Gumbert	**Brown** (3–2)	Smith	5,500	35–26
63	June 24	@ Giants	3–4	Hubbell	**Birkofer** (3–3)	—	—	35–27
64	June 24	@ Giants	4–1	**Weaver** (9–5)	Fitzsimmons	—	15,000	36–27
65	June 25	@ Giants	4–5	Coffman	**Swift** (7–5)	—	5,000	36–28
66	June 26	@ Bees	2–1	**Lucas** (6–1)	MacFayden	—	5,352	37–28
67	June 28	@ Bees	11–2	**Blanton** (6–4)	Benge	—	—	38–28
68	June 28	@ Bees	4–6	Cantwell	**Weaver** (9–6)	Smith	18,133	38–29
69	June 30	Cardinals	1–2	Haines	**Brown** (3–3)	—	—	38–30
70	June 30	Cardinals	3–4	Rhem	**Blanton** (6–5)	Dean	20,000	38–31

July: 13–15 (Home: 6–10; Away: 7–5)

#	Date	Opponent	Score	Win	Loss	Save	Attendance	Record
71	July 1	Cardinals	9–4	**Lucas** (7–1)	Walker	**Swift** (1)	—	39–31
72	July 2	Cardinals	2–4	Dean	**Weaver** (9–7)	—	—	39–32
73	July 4	Cubs	2–3 (10)	French	**Blanton** (6–6)	—	—	39–33
74	July 4	Cubs	7–4	**Brown** (4–3)	Lee	**Welch** (1)	33,000	40–33
75	July 5	Cubs	4–2	**Swift** (8–5)	Warneke	—	—	41–33
76	July 9	Phillies	16–5	**Birkofer** (4–3)	Kowalik	—	—	42–33
77	July 10	Phillies	6–9 (10)	Walters	**Swift** (8–6)	—	—	42–34
78	July 12	Bees	2–6 (10)	Cantwell	**Blanton** (6–7)	—	5,000	42–35
79	July 13	Bees	1–4	Chaplin	**Swift** (8–7)	—	1,200	42–36
80	July 14	Bees	2–1	**Brown** (5–3)	MacFayden	—	2,000	43–36
81	July 15	Giants	5–4 (10)	**Birkofer** (5–3)	Fitzsimmons	—	—	44–36
82	July 15	Giants	4–14	Smith	**Weaver** (9–8)	—	15,000	44–37
83	July 16	Giants	6–7	Coffman	**Brown** (5–4)	Schumacher	6,000	44–38
84	July 17	Giants	0–6	Hubbell	**Swift** (8–8)	—	—	44–39
85	July 18	Dodgers	5–6	Jeffcoat	**Brown** (5–5)	Clark	8,000	44–40
86	July 19	Dodgers	2–4	Clark	**Blanton** (6–8)	Mungo	4,000	44–41
87	July 21	@ Phillies	17–6	**Swift** (9–8)	Moore	—	—	45–41
88	July 22	@ Phillies	4–16	Bowman	**Brown** (5–6)	—	—	45–42
89	July 23	@ Phillies	10–1	**Blanton** (7–8)	Passeau	—	—	46–42
90	July 25	@ Dodgers	7–4	**Swift** (10–8)	Clark	—	4,700	47–42
91	July 26	@ Dodgers	0–1	Mungo	**Lucas** (7–2)	—	—	47–43
92	July 26	@ Dodgers	3–4	Brandt	**Brown** (5–7)	—	15,000	47–44
93	July 27	@ Dodgers	3–6	Frankhouse	**Blanton** (7–9)	—	485	47–45
94	July 28	@ Dodgers	9–8 (10)	**Lucas** (8–2)	Brandt	—	—	48–45
95	July 29	@ Bees	1–4	MacFayden	**Swift** (10–9)	—	9,284	48–46
96	July 29	@ Bees	10–4	**Brown** (6–7)	Smith	—	9,284	49–46
97	July 30	@ Bees	5–3 (11)	**Brown** (7–7)	Cantwell	—	2,612	50–46
98	July 31	@ Bees	10–5	**Weaver** (10–8)	Chaplin	**Hoyt** (1)	3,216	51–46

August: 15–15 (Home: 11–7; Away: 4–8)

#	Date	Opponent	Score	Win	Loss	Save	Attendance	Record
99	August 1	@ Giants	0–6	Smith	**Blanton** (7–10)	—	—	51–47
100	August 2	@ Giants	2–3	Hubbell	**Swift** (10–10)	—	15,000	51–48
101	August 5	@ Reds	4–6	Schott	**Brown** (7–8)	—	6,373	51–49
102	August 7	@ Reds	5–1	**Lucas** (9–2)	Hollingsworth	—	—	52–49
103	August 7	@ Reds	1–0	**Blanton** (8–10)	Hallahan	—	3,969	53–49
104	August 8	@ Cubs	2–3	French	**Swift** (10–11)	—	—	53–50
105	August 9	@ Cubs	2–9	Lee	**Brown** (7–9)	—	—	53–51
106	August 9	@ Cubs	1–10	Davis	**Birkofer** (5–4)	—	40,000	53–52
107	August 11	Reds	6–3	**Lucas** (10–2)	Derringer	—	—	54–52
108	August 11	Reds	3–7	Hallahan	**Blanton** (8–11)	—	—	54–53
109	August 12	Reds	6–1	**Swift** (11–11)	Schott	—	—	55–53
110	August 13	Reds	5–4	**Hoyt** (3–2)	Hollingsworth	—	—	56–53
111	August 15	Cardinals	7–1	**Weaver** (11–8)	Haines	—	—	57–53
112	August 16	Cardinals	3–4	Winford	**Lucas** (10–3)	Parmelee	—	57–54
113	August 16	Cardinals	2–7	Dean	**Swift** (11–12)	—	35,000	57–55
114	August 18	Cubs	4–5	French	**Blanton** (8–12)	—	—	57–56
115	August 18	Cubs	3–1	**Hoyt** (4–2)	Lee	—	—	58–56
116	August 19	Cubs	5–4	**Swift** (12–12)	Root	—	—	59–56
117	August 20	Cubs	8–7 (11)	**Birkofer** (6–4)	Warneke	—	—	60–56
118	August 21	@ Cardinals	5–4	**Lucas** (11–3)	Haines	—	—	61–56
119	August 22	@ Cardinals	3–4	Winford	**Swift** (12–13)	—	—	61–57
120	August 23	@ Cardinals	3–7	Heusser	**Blanton** (8–13)	—	—	61–58
121	August 23	@ Cardinals	6–6 (10)			—	—	61–58
122	August 24	@ Cardinals	17–5	**Brown** (8–9)	Heusser	—	—	62–58
123	August 25	Dodgers	1–4 (8)	Butcher	**Birkofer** (6–5)	—	—	62–59
124	August 26	Dodgers	3–10	Brandt	**Swift** (12–14)	—	—	62–60
125	August 27	Dodgers	6–3	**Weaver** (12–8)	Mungo	**Blanton** (2)	2,500	63–60
126	August 28	Giants	2–7 (14)	Fitzsimmons	**Hoyt** (4–3)	Gabler	5,000	63–61
127	August 29	Giants	7–4	**Lucas** (12–3)	Smith	—	—	64–61
128	August 30	Bees	4–2	**Swift** (13–14)	Chaplin	—	—	65–61
129	August 30	Bees	3–1	**Blanton** (9–13)	Smith	—	8,000	66–61

September: 18–9 (Home: 10–2; Away: 8–7)

#	Date	Opponent	Score	Win	Loss	Save	Attendance	Record
130	September 1	Bees	3–1	**Weaver** (13–8)	MacFayden	—	1,000	67–61
131	September 3	Phillies	3–4	Bowman	**Lucas** (12–4)	—	—	67–62
132	September 3	Phillies	5–1	**Hoyt** (5–3)	Passeau	—	5,000	68–62
133	September 4	Cubs	0–8	French	**Swift** (13–15)	—	—	68–63
134	September 5	Cubs	1–0	**Blanton** (10–13)	Henshaw	—	—	69–63
135	September 6	Cubs	5–4	**Weaver** (14–8)	Davis	**Swift** (2)	—	70–63
136	September 7	Cardinals	4–1	**Hoyt** (6–3)	Dean	—	—	71–63
137	September 7	Cardinals	14–1	**Brown** (9–9)	Parmelee	—	—	72–63
138	September 9	@ Dodgers	7–8	Brandt	**Blanton** (10–14)	—	—	72–64
139	September 10	@ Dodgers	11–5	**Swift** (14–15)	Frankhouse	—	5,000	73–64
140	September 11	@ Bees	10–3	**Blanton** (11–14)	Weir	—	1,594	74–64
141	September 12	@ Bees	2–3	Bush	**Hoyt** (6–4)	—	1,500	74–65
142	September 13	@ Phillies	5–3	**Birkofer** (7–5)	Sivess	**Blanton** (3)	—	75–65
143	September 13	@ Phillies	3–4	Jorgens	**Brown** (9–10)	—	—	75–66
144	September 14	@ Phillies	11–4	**Swift** (15–15)	Benge	—	—	76–66
145	September 14	@ Phillies	6–5 (10)	**Lucas** (13–4)	Bowman	—	—	77–66
146	September 16	@ Giants	1–2	Smith	**Blanton** (11–15)	Coffman	—	77–67
147	September 16	@ Giants	4–3	**Hoyt** (7–4)	Schumacher	—	22,000	78–67
148	September 17	Reds	14–10	**Brown** (10–10)	Hollingsworth	—	—	79–67
149	September 19	Reds	7–6 (11)	**Swift** (16–15)	Hallahan	—	—	80–67
150	September 20	Reds	5–1	**Blanton** (12–15)	Derringer	—	—	81–67
151	September 20	Reds	6–4	**Lucas** (14–4)	Davis	—	10,000	82–67
152	September 22	@ Cubs	4–11	Davis	**Hoyt** (7–5)	—	3,900	82–68
153	September 23	@ Cubs	7–6 (10)	**Lucas** (15–4)	Warneke	—	—	83–68
154	September 24	@ Cubs	4–0	**Blanton** (13–15)	French	—	13,000	84–68
155	September 26	@ Reds	1–5	Hallahan	**Swift** (16–16)	—	—	84–69
156	September 27	@ Reds	5–6	Moore	**Brown** (10–11)	Mooty	5,377	84–70

Legend: = Win = Loss = Tie
Bold = Pirates team member

=== Roster ===
1936 Pittsburgh Pirates
**Roster**
**Pitchers**: 27 Russ Bauers; 49 Ralph Birkofer; 46 Cy Blanton; 47 Mace Brown; 41 Guy Bush; 48 Waite Hoyt; 40 Red Lucas; 45 Bill Swift; 44 Jack Tising; 43 Jim Weaver; 51 Johnny Welch	**Catchers**: 32 Hal Finney; 31 Tom Padden; 30 Al Todd; **Infielders**: 25 Bill Brubaker; 22 Cookie Lavagetto; 21 Gus Suhr; 21 Arky Vaughan; 26 Pep Young	**Outfielders**: -- Earl Browne; -- Johnny Dickshot; 12 Bud Hafey; 16 Woody Jensen; 14 Fred Schulte; 10 Lloyd Waner; 11 Paul Waner	**Manager**: 20 Pie Traynor; **Coaches**: 33 Jewel Ens; 36 Honus Wagner

== Player stats ==
=== Batting ===
==== Starters by position ====
Note: Pos = Position; G = Games played; AB = At bats; H = Hits; Avg. = Batting average; HR = Home runs; RBI = Runs batted in

Pos	Player	G	AB	H	Avg.	HR	RBI
C	Tom Padden	88	281	70	.249	1	31
1B	Gus Suhr	156	583	182	.312	11	118
2B	Pep Young	125	475	118	.248	6	77
3B	Bill Brubaker	145	554	160	.289	6	102
SS	Arky Vaughan	156	568	190	.335	9	78
LF	Woody Jensen	153	696	197	.283	10	58
CF	Lloyd Waner	106	414	133	.321	1	31
RF	Paul Waner	148	585	218	.373	5	94

==== Other batters ====
Note: G = Games played; AB = At bats; H = Hits; Avg. = Batting average; HR = Home runs; RBI = Runs batted in

Player	G	AB	H	Avg.	HR	RBI
Al Todd	76	267	73	.273	2	28
Fred Schulte	74	238	62	.261	1	17
Cookie Lavagetto	60	197	48	.244	2	26
Bud Hafey	39	118	25	.212	4	13
Hal Finney	21	35	0	.000	0	3
Earl Browne	8	23	7	.304	0	3
Johnny Dickshot	9	9	2	.222	0	1

=== Pitching ===
==== Starting pitchers ====
Note: G = Games pitched; IP = Innings pitched; W = Wins; L = Losses; ERA = Earned run average; SO = Strikeouts

Player	G	IP	W	L	ERA	SO
Bill Swift	45	262.1	16	16	4.01	92
Cy Blanton	44	235.2	13	15	3.51	127
Jim Weaver	38	225.2	14	8	4.31	108
Red Lucas	27	175.2	15	4	3.18	53
Russ Bauers	1	1.1	0	0	33.75	0

==== Other pitchers ====
Note: G = Games pitched; IP = Innings pitched; W = Wins; L = Losses; ERA = Earned run average; SO = Strikeouts

Player	G	IP	W	L	ERA	SO
Mace Brown	47	165.0	10	11	3.87	56
Waite Hoyt	22	116.2	7	5	2.70	37
Ralph Birkofer	34	109.1	7	5	4.69	44
Jack Tising	10	47.0	1	3	4.21	27

==== Relief pitchers ====
Note: G = Games pitched; W = Wins; L = Losses; SV = Saves; ERA = Earned run average; SO = Strikeouts

Player	G	W	L	SV	ERA	SO
Guy Bush	16	1	3	2	5.97	10
Johnny Welch	9	0	0	1	4.50	5

== Awards and honors ==
1936 Major League Baseball All-Star Game

- Gus Suhr, reserve
- Arky Vaughan, reserve

=== League top five finishers ===
Cy Blanton

- #3 in NL in strikeouts (127)

Red Lucas

- #5 in NL in ERA (3.18)

Gus Suhr

- #3 in NL in RBI (118)
- #5 in NL in runs scored (111)

Bill Swift

- #5 in NL in losses (16)

Arky Vaughan

- NL leader in runs scored (122)
- NL leader in on-base percentage (.453)
- #5 in NL in batting average (.335)

Paul Waner

- NL leader in batting average (.373)
- #2 in NL in hits (218)
- #3 in NL in on-base percentage (.446)
- #5 in NL in slugging percentage (.520)

== Farm system ==
Level	Team	League	Manager
A	Scranton Miners	New York–Pennsylvania League	Elmer Yoter
B	Savannah Indians	Sally League	Bill Gould and Bob LaMotte
C	Hutchinson Larks	Western Association	Dick Goldberg
D	Jeannette Little Pirates	Pennsylvania State Association	Wilbur Cooper
D	Portageville-Owensboro Pirates	Kentucky–Illinois–Tennessee League	Hughie Wise
D	Winnipeg Maroons	Northern League	Wes Griffin

LEAGUE CHAMPIONS: Scranton, Jeannette
