= 1936 Chicago Cubs season =

1936 Chicago Cubs
- League: National League
- Ballpark: Wrigley Field
- City: Chicago
- Record: 87–67 (.565)
- League place: 2nd
- Owners: Philip K. Wrigley
- General managers: Charles Weber
- Managers: Charlie Grimm
- Radio: WGN (Bob Elson); WBBM (Pat Flanagan); WCFL (Hal Totten); WIND (Russ Hodges); WJJD (Johnny O'Hara)

The 1936 Chicago Cubs season was the 65th season of the Chicago Cubs franchise, the 61st in the National League and the 21st at Wrigley Field. The Cubs tied with the St. Louis Cardinals for second in the National League with a record of 87–67.

== Regular season ==
- April 14, 1936: Billy Herman became the last National League player to have five hits on Opening Day in the 20th century.

=== Season standings ===
National League
Team	W	L	Pct.	GB	Home	Road
New York Giants	92	62	.597	—	52‍–‍26	40‍–‍36
St. Louis Cardinals	87	67	.565	5	43‍–‍33	44‍–‍34
Chicago Cubs	87	67	.565	5	50‍–‍27	37‍–‍40
Pittsburgh Pirates	84	70	.545	8	46‍–‍30	38‍–‍40
Cincinnati Reds	74	80	.481	18	42‍–‍34	32‍–‍46
Boston Bees	71	83	.461	21	35‍–‍43	36‍–‍40
Brooklyn Dodgers	67	87	.435	25	37‍–‍40	30‍–‍47
Philadelphia Phillies	54	100	.351	38	30‍–‍48	24‍–‍52

=== Record vs. opponents ===
1936 National League record Sources:
Team	BSN	BRO	CHC	CIN	NYG	PHI	PIT	STL
Boston	—	10–12–2	6–16	13–9	9–13	12–10	8–14–1	13–9
Brooklyn	12–10–2	—	7–15	9–13	9–13	12–10	9–13	9–13
Chicago	16–6	15–7	—	10–12	11–11	16–6	10–12	9–13
Cincinnati	9–13	13–9	12–10	—	9–13	13–9	8–14	10–12
New York	13–9	13–9	11–11	13–9	—	17–5	15–7	10–12
Philadelphia	10–12	10–12	6–16	9–13	5–17	—	7–15	7–15
Pittsburgh	14–8–1	13–9	12–10	14–8	7–15	15–7	—	9–13–1
St. Louis	9–13	13–9	13–9	12–10	12–10	15–7	13–9–1	—

=== Roster ===
1936 Chicago Cubs
Roster
Pitchers: 18 Clay Bryant; 16 Tex Carleton; 24 Curt Davis; 14 Larry French; 22 Roy Henshaw; 24 Fabian Kowalik; 15 Bill Lee; 17 Charlie Root; 23 Clyde Shoun; 12 Lon Warneke	Catchers: 9 Gabby Hartnett; 41 Ken O'Dea; 42 Walter Stephenson; Infielders: 43 Phil Cavarretta; 1 Woody English; 7 Charlie Grimm; 39 Stan Hack; 2 Billy Herman; 11 Billy Jurges; 3 Gene Lillard	Outfielders: 4 Ethan Allen; 6 Frank Demaree; 51 Augie Galan; 8 Johnny Gill; 4 Chuck Klein; 5 Tuck Stainback	Manager: 7 Charlie Grimm; Coaches: 56 Red Corriden; 61 Roy Johnson

== Player stats ==
=== Batting ===
==== Starters by position ====
Note: Pos = Position; G = Games played; AB = At bats; H = Hits; Avg. = Batting average; HR = Home runs; RBI = Runs batted in

Pos	Player	G	AB	H	Avg.	HR	RBI
C	Gabby Hartnett	121	424	130	.307	7	64
1B	Phil Cavarretta	124	458	125	.273	9	56
2B	Billy Herman	153	632	211	.334	5	93
SS	Billy Jurges	118	429	120	.280	1	42
3B	Stan Hack	149	561	167	.298	6	78
OF	Ethan Allen	93	373	110	.295	3	39
OF	Augie Galan	145	575	152	.264	8	81
OF	Frank Demaree	154	605	212	.350	16	96

==== Other batters ====
Note: G = Games played; AB = At bats; H = Hits; Avg. = Batting average; HR = Home runs; RBI = Runs batted in

Player	G	AB	H	Avg.	HR	RBI
Ken O'Dea	80	189	58	.307	2	38
Woody English	64	182	45	.247	0	20
Johnny Gill	70	174	44	.253	7	28
Charlie Grimm	39	132	33	.250	1	16
Chuck Klein	29	109	32	.294	5	18
Tuck Stainback	44	75	13	.173	1	5
Gene Lillard	19	34	7	.206	0	2
Walter Stephenson	6	12	1	.083	0	1

=== Pitching ===
==== Starting pitchers ====
Note: G = Games pitched; IP = Innings pitched; W = Wins; L = Losses; ERA = Earned run average; SO = Strikeouts

Player	G	IP	W	L	ERA	SO
Bill Lee	43	258.2	18	11	3.31	102
Curt Davis	24	153.0	11	9	3.00	52

==== Other pitchers ====
Note: G = Games pitched; IP = Innings pitched; W = Wins; L = Losses; ERA = Earned run average; SO = Strikeouts

Player	G	IP	W	L	ERA	SO
Larry French	43	252.1	18	9	3.39	104
Lon Warneke	40	240.1	16	13	3.45	113
Tex Carleton	35	197.1	14	10	3.65	88
Roy Henshaw	39	129.1	6	5	3.97	69

==== Relief pitchers ====
Note: G = Games pitched; W = Wins; L = Losses; SV = Saves; ERA = Earned run average; SO = Strikeouts

Player	G	W	L	SV	ERA	SO
Charlie Root	33	3	6	1	4.15	32
Clay Bryant	26	1	2	0	3.30	35
Fabian Kowalik	6	0	2	1	6.75	1
Clyde Shoun	4	0	0	0	12.46	1

== Awards and honors ==
=== Records ===
- Billy Herman, National League record, most doubles in one season by a second baseman (Herman tied his own record that he set in 1935) (57)

== Farm system ==
Level	Team	League	Manager
AA	Los Angeles Angels	Pacific Coast League	Jack Lelivelt
B	Portsmouth Cubs	Piedmont League	Pip Koehler
C	Ponca City Angels	Western Association	Mike Gazella

LEAGUE CHAMPIONS: Ponca City
