= Pfirman =

Pfirman is a surname. Notable people with the surname include:

- Cy Pfirman (1889–1937), American professional baseball umpire
- Stephanie Pfirman, American climatologist
- Tierney Pfirman (born 1994), American professional basketball player
