= Guy Bush =

American baseball player (1901–1985)

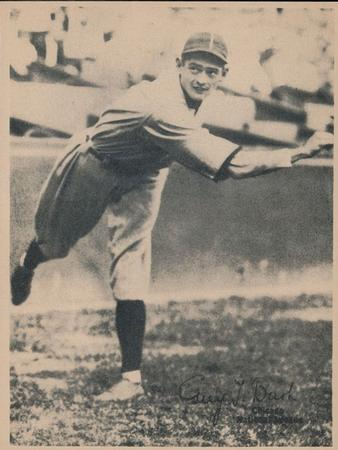
- Pitcher
- Born: August 23, 1901; Aberdeen, Mississippi, U.S.
- Died: July 2, 1985 (aged 83); Shannon, Mississippi, U.S.
- Batted: Right Threw: Right

MLB debut
- September 17, 1923, for the Chicago Cubs

Last MLB appearance
- May 26, 1945, for the Cincinnati Reds

MLB statistics
- Win–loss record: 176–136
- Earned run average: 3.86
- Strikeouts: 850
- Stats at Baseball Reference

Teams
- Chicago Cubs (1923–1934); Pittsburgh Pirates (1935–1936); Boston Bees (1936–1937); St. Louis Cardinals (1938); Cincinnati Reds (1945)

Guy Terrell Bush (August 23, 1901 – July 2, 1985) was an American right-handed pitcher in Major League Baseball, nicknamed "the Mississippi Mudcat".

Bush played in the major leagues from 1923 to 1938 and again in 1945. The 6-foot-tall (1.83 m) pitcher played for the Chicago Cubs, Pittsburgh Pirates, Boston Bees, St. Louis Cardinals and Cincinnati Reds in his 17-year professional baseball career. He is best known for being the pitcher who allowed Babe Ruth's final two career home runs.

== Baseball career ==
=== Chicago Cubs ===
Bush was originally drafted and signed by the Chicago Cubs in 1919 for $1,000. After attending the now defunct Tupelo Military Institute in Mississippi, Bush made his major league debut for the team that year on September 17, 1923. In his only game of the season, Bush came in the ninth inning and gave up one hit while striking out two. He returned with the Cubs the following season as a dual-duty starter and reliever. Bush pitched to a 2–5 record in sixteen games, half of which he started. He threw four complete games and finished four others. In 80 2/3 innings of work, he gave up 91 hits and 36 earned runs, and struck out 36 batters. In the following few seasons, Bush started to take a larger role as a reliever. Bush led the league in saves in 1925, with four, and again in 1929 when he had eight. He also led the league in relief wins that season and the following season.

After finishing the 1926 campaign fourth in the league with a 2.86 earned run average in a primarily relief setting, Bush started more games than he relieved the following season. Despite giving up 79 walks while only striking out 62 batters, he had a 10–10 record on the year, with a 3.03 ERA. Bush started 22 of his 36 games, including a marathon on May 14, 1927, in which Bush and Boston Braves starter Charlie Robertson duelled for eighteen innings. Bush won the game after Robertson tired, surrendering five runs in the 18th inning. In the National League since then, only Carl Hubbell in 1933 and Vern Law in 1955 have matched Bush's marathon performance. Bush's ERA rose to 3.83 the next year, but he did post a 15–6 record in 42 games, 24 of which he started.

Bush followed up with a career year in 1929. He finished the year on top of the league in saves and games pitched, and fourth in the league for wins. Also that year, Bush ranked twelfth in the NL Most Valuable Player Award voting. Even more impressive, Bush had a streak of eleven straight wins until it was broken by a relief loss on August 12 against the Braves. Bush was a large contributor to the team's pennant-winning season, in which they finished on top of the NL with a 98–54 record. Bush was most dominant in the 1929 World Series against the Philadelphia Athletics. Bush pitched two games in the series, starting one and relieving another. Bush started Game 3 and pitched a complete game, surrendering only one run on nine hits. Despite the Cubs' loss of the Series in five games, Bush pitched a total of eleven innings with 4 strikeouts and gave up just one run. After the success of the 1929 season, Bush had a disappointing season in 1930. In 225 innings of work, Bush posted a 15–10 record with a 6.20 ERA, one of the worst in the league that season. He gave up 291 hits, fifth highest in the league, and led the league in earned runs allowed with 155 and wild pitches with 12. In November 1930, writer F.C. Lane wrote in Baseball Magazine about Bush's unique pitching windup:

On the hurling mound (Guy) Bush has developed a curious 'hop-toad' lunge that is unique. When he really bears down on the ball, he actually springs forward and finishes up in a squat position like a catcher reaching for a low pitch. This freakish hop forward would be impossible to many pitchers. Bush can do it by virtue of his lithe and wiry build, his long thin legs.

Bush had an improved season in 1931, thanks to performances such as a September 13 one-hitter against the Braves. He finished the year with a 16–8 record and a 4.49 ERA, in 180 1/3 innings of work. The following year, the Cubs again won the pennant behind Bush's 19–11 record and 3.20 ERA. That year, Bush finished the year third in the league for wins and 23rd in the NL MVP voting. The Cubs were pinned up against the New York Yankees in the 1932 World Series. It was an infamous matchup, known now for the general tension and fighting between both teams. (A fiery bench-jockey, Bush helped lead Chicago's mean-spirited heckling of Babe Ruth; "The Bambino" was unfazed, as evidenced by his legendary "called shot" home run in Game 3.) Bush did not fare well this time around in the World Series. As the starting pitcher for the Cubs in Game 1, Bush gave up eight runs on three hits, and walked five in just five innings of work, en route to a 12–6 Yankees win. Bush started Game 4, and lasted less than an inning. He hit Babe Ruth and gave up two hits and one earned run and was plucked from the pitching mound. For the series, Bush finished with a 0–1 record and 14.29 ERA, and gave up nine earned runs in less than six innings of work.

Bush bounced back in 1933, finishing with his first 20-game winning season. He tied with Dizzy Dean and Ben Cantwell for the second most wins in the National League while also ranking among the NL's top ten with four shutouts (4th), 20 complete games (8th), and a 2.75 ERA (9th). Early in the 1933 season, Bush challenged Dizzy Dean to a mid-game fight; in describing their rivalry, Bush declared: “I get more satisfaction out of beating that guy [Dean] once than I do winning from anyone else twice." Bush followed up with another solid season in 1934, his last with the Cubs. On November 22, 1934, just a little over a month after the season, Bush was traded along with outfielder Babe Herman and Jim Weaver to the Pittsburgh Pirates for left-handed pitcher Larry French and future Hall of Famer Freddie Lindstrom, also then playing outfield after spending most of his career at third base. Bush left the Cubs after twelve years with the team and finished as one of the club's winningest pitchers with a record of 152–101.

=== Pittsburgh Pirates ===
Bush did not show much improvement in 1935 with the Pirates. He did, however, place his name into the record books. On May 25, the Pirates played the Braves in one of Babe Ruth's final games. Ruth put on a performance, collecting four hits including three home runs and knocking in six runners. The first home run shot came off pitcher Red Lucas, while the last two came off Bush. The last home run was Ruth's career home run #714, and was a mammoth of a shot. It was the first home run to clear the right field grandstands at Forbes Field and was reportedly measured as a 600-foot (180 m) bomb. It was the last home run — in fact, the last hit of any kind — in Ruth's major league career, which ended less than a week later. Bush later described the Babe's final blast: "He [Ruth] got ahead of the ball and hit it over the triple deck, clear out of the ballpark. I'm telling you, it was the longest cockeyed ball I ever saw in my life."

Despite Ruth's Goliath performance, Waite Hoyt, Ruth's former Yankee teammate, came in relief for Bush and won the game 11–7, albeit after initially blowing the save. The Pirates sent the 34-year-old Bush to the bullpen for the 1936 season. The transition did not go well with Bush as he gave up 49 hits in just 34 2/3 innings of work, and posted a 5.97 ERA.

=== Journeyman ===
Midway through the season, on July 20, 1936, the Pirates released Bush. He was subsequently signed by the Boston Bees (the former Braves). The Bees used him primarily as a starter and his stats improved, as a result. Despite pitching with below a 3.60 ERA in both 1936 and 1937, the St. Louis Cardinals bought Bush from the Bees months prior to the start of the 1938 season. On May 7, after coming in relief in six games, Bush was released by the Cardinals. Bush's career seemed to be over, however, he did come back to the majors seven years later, at age 43. Since many teams were affected by players leaving to fight in World War II, ex-players like Bush, Babe Herman and Hod Lisenbee were signed as replacements.

The Reds signed Bush prior to the 1945 season, and used him as a closer. Despite picking up one save in four relief appearances, the Reds released Bush on June 2, 1945. Bush's career was finished, this time for good. The Mississippi Mudcat finished his career with a 176–136 pitching record and a 3.86 ERA over 2722 innings and 542 games–308 as a starter, 234 in relief.

Bush was a better than average fielding pitcher in his major league career, recording a .974 fielding percentage, which was 14 points higher than the league average at his position. On June 23, 1934, after committing an error on a sacrifice bunt by Hal Schumacher at Wrigley Field, Bush handled the next 179 total chances (33 putouts, 146 assists) without an error to finish out his career.

Bush also managed the Battle Creek Belles of the All-American Girls Professional Baseball League in parts of two seasons spanning 1951–52.

Guy Bush died at age 83 on July 2, 1985, of cardiac arrest after working in his garden in Shannon, Mississippi.

== In popular media ==
Bush was portrayed by actor Richard Tyson in the 1992 Babe Ruth biopic The Babe. The film played up the rivalry between Bush and Ruth.

== See also ==
- List of Major League Baseball annual saves leaders
