= 1934 Major League Baseball All-Star Game =

1934 American baseball competition

	1	2	3	4	5	6	7	8	9	R	H	E
American League	0	0	0	2	6	1	0	0	0	9	14	1
National League	1	0	3	0	3	0	0	0	0	7	8	1
- Date: July 10, 1934
- Venue: Polo Grounds
- City: New York City
- Managers: Joe Cronin (WSH); Bill Terry (NYG)
- Attendance: 48,363
- Radio: CBS, NBC
- Radio announcers: France Laux, Ted Husing (CBS); Tom Manning, Ford Bond, Graham McNamee (NBC)

The 1934 Major League Baseball All-Star Game was the second edition of the mid-summer classic between the all-stars of the American League (AL) and National League (NL), the two leagues comprising Major League Baseball. It was held on July 10 in Manhattan, New York City, at the Polo Grounds, the home of the New York Giants of the National League, the defending World Series champions. The American League won 9–7, and every starter on both teams except Wally Berger was later inducted into the Baseball Hall of Fame.

The game is well known among baseball historians for the performance of NL starting pitcher Carl Hubbell of the host Giants. After allowing the first two batters to reach base on a single and a base on balls, Hubbell struck out five of the game's best hitters – Babe Ruth, Lou Gehrig, Jimmie Foxx, Al Simmons, and Joe Cronin – in succession, setting a longstanding All-Star Game record for consecutive strikeouts.

Trailing 4–2, the American League scored six times in the top of the fifth inning to take the lead for good. The teams combined for sixteen runs on 22 hits; the two home runs were hit early in the game by the NL (Frankie Frisch, Joe Medwick), both with the St. Louis Cardinals, the World Series champions later that year.

== Rosters ==
Players in italics have since been inducted into the National Baseball Hall of Fame.

=== American League ===
Starters
Position	Player	Team	All-Star Games
P	Lefty Gomez	Yankees	2
C	Bill Dickey	Yankees	2
1B	Lou Gehrig	Yankees	2
2B	Charlie Gehringer	Tigers	2
3B	Jimmie Foxx	Athletics	2
SS	Joe Cronin	Senators	2
LF	Heinie Manush	Senators	1
CF	Al Simmons	White Sox	2
RF	Babe Ruth	Yankees	2

Pitchers
Position	Player	Team	All-Star Games
P	Tommy Bridges	Tigers	1
P	Mel Harder	Indians	1
P	Red Ruffing	Yankees	1
P	Jack Russell	Senators	1

Reserves
Position	Player	Team	All-Star Games
C	Mickey Cochrane	Tigers	1
C	Rick Ferrell	Red Sox	2
3B	Jimmy Dykes	White Sox	2
3B	Pinky Higgins	Athletics	1
OF	Earl Averill	Indians	2
OF	Ben Chapman	Yankees	2
OF	Sam West	Browns	2

=== National League ===
Starters
Position	Player	Team	All-Star Games
P	Carl Hubbell	Giants	2
C	Gabby Hartnett	Cubs	2
1B	Bill Terry	Giants	2
2B	Frankie Frisch	Cardinals	2
3B	Pie Traynor	Pirates	2
SS	Travis Jackson	Giants	1
LF	Joe Medwick	Cardinals	1
CF	Wally Berger	Braves	2
RF	Kiki Cuyler	Cubs	1

Pitchers
Position	Player	Team	All-Star Games
P	Dizzy Dean	Cardinals	1
P	Fred Frankhouse	Braves	1
P	Van Mungo	Dodgers	1
P	Lon Warneke	Cubs	2

Reserves
Position	Player	Team	All-Star Games
C	Al López	Dodgers	1
2B	Billy Herman	Cubs	1
3B	Pepper Martin	Cardinals	2
SS	Arky Vaughan	Pirates	1
OF	Chuck Klein	Cubs	2
OF	Jo-Jo Moore	Giants	1
OF	Mel Ott	Giants	1
OF	Paul Waner	Pirates	2

== Game ==
=== Umpires ===
Cy Pfirman, NL (home), Brick Owens, AL (first base), Dolly Stark, NL (second base), George Moriarty, AL (third base); the umpires rotated positions clockwise in the middle of the fifth inning, with Owens moving behind the plate.

=== Starting lineups ===
American League				National League			
Order	Player	Team	Position	Order	Player	Team	Position
1	Charlie Gehringer	Tigers	2B	1	Frankie Frisch	Cardinals	2B
2	Heinie Manush	Senators	OF	2	Pie Traynor	Pirates	3B
3	Babe Ruth	Yankees	OF	3	Joe Medwick	Cardinals	OF
4	Lou Gehrig	Yankees	1B	4	Kiki Cuyler	Cubs	OF
5	Jimmie Foxx	Athletics	3B	5	Wally Berger	Braves	OF
6	Al Simmons	White Sox	OF	6	Bill Terry	Giants	1B
7	Joe Cronin	Senators	SS	7	Travis Jackson	Giants	SS
8	Bill Dickey	Yankees	C	8	Gabby Hartnett	Cubs	C
9	Lefty Gomez	Yankees	P	9	Carl Hubbell	Giants	P

== Linescore ==
Tuesday, July 10, 1934 1:30 pm (ET) at Polo Grounds in Manhattan, New York
Team	1	2	3	4	5	6	7	8	9	R	H	E
American	0	0	0	2	6	1	0	0	0	9	14	1
National	1	0	3	0	3	0	0	0	0	7	8	1
WP: Mel Harder (1–0) LP: Van Mungo (0–1); Home runs: AL: None; NL: Frankie Frisch (2), Joe Medwick (1)
