= Chuck Sheerin =

American baseball player (1909–1986)

- Infielder
- Born: April 17, 1909; Brooklyn, New York, U.S.
- Died: September 27, 1986 (aged 77); Valley Stream, New York, U.S.
- Batted: Right Threw: Right

MLB debut
- April 21, 1936, Philadelphia Phillies

Last MLB appearance
- September 27, 1936, Philadelphia Phillies

MLB statistics
- Batting average: .264
- Hits: 19
- Runs batted in: 4
- Stats at Baseball Reference

Teams
- Philadelphia Phillies (1936)

Charles Joseph Sheerin (April 17, 1909 – September 27, 1986) was an American professional baseball infielder. He played one season in Major League Baseball for the Philadelphia Phillies in 1936.

He was born in Brooklyn, New York, and attended Fordham University.

Sheerin played five seasons in the minor leagues, from 1933 to 1938. The teams he played on were: the York White Roses of the New York-Penn League (1933), the Atlanta Crackers of the Southern Association (1933–1934), the Tulsa Oilers of the Texas League (1935), the Hazelton Mountaineers of the New York–Penn League (1936), and the Toronto Maple Leafs of the International League (1938).

In the minor leagues, he appeared in 503 games and hit .248 in 1,774 at-bats. Sheerin's best season came in 1934 when he hit .288 for the Atlanta Crackers in 295 at-bats. Sheerin also posted a fielding percentage of .942 in the minor leagues. He did not play in 1937.

For the 1936 Philadelphia Phillies, his only season in the majors, Sheerin played in 39 games as an infielder, hitting .264 in 72 at-bats and with a fielding percentage of .942.

In later life, Sheerin was a baseball coach at Lafayette High School in Brooklyn. Amongst the players he coached was future Baseball Hall of Fame pitcher Sandy Koufax; Koufax was the first baseman on the Lafayette baseball team in his senior year but never pitched for them. Also amongst those Sheerin coached was future New York Mets owner, Fred Wilpon, who was the team's captain and star left-handed pitcher.

Sheerin died in Valley Stream, New York, on September 27, 1986, and is buried at the Cemetery of the Holy Rood in Westbury, New York.
