= Arndt Jorgens =

American baseball player (1905–1980)

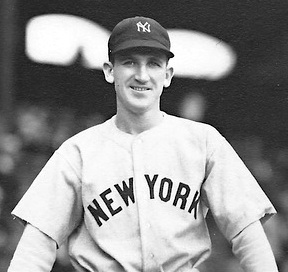
- Catcher
- Born: Arndt Ludvig Jørgensen; May 18, 1905; Modum, Norway
- Died: March 1, 1980 (aged 74); Wilmette, Illinois, U.S.
- Batted: Right Threw: Right

MLB debut
- April 26, 1929, for the New York Yankees

Last MLB appearance
- August 2, 1939, for the New York Yankees

MLB statistics
- Batting average: .238
- Home runs: 4
- Runs batted in: 89
- Stats at Baseball Reference

Teams
- New York Yankees (1929–1939)

Career highlights and awards
- 5× World Series champion (1932, 1936–1939)

Arndt Ludwig Jorgens (born Arndt Ludvig Jørgensen; May 18, 1905 – March 1, 1980) was an American professional baseball catcher who played in Major League Baseball (MLB) for the New York Yankees from 1929 through 1939.

Jorgens was born in Modum, Norway, and immigrated to the United States as a young child. After playing baseball for his high school, Jorgens became a semi-professional player before signing a professional contract. After three years in the minor leagues, he signed with the Yankees before the 1929 season. A backup to Bill Dickey throughout his career, Jorgens played sparingly. He was a member of five World Series champion teams even though he did not play in a single World Series game.

== Early life ==
Arndt Ludvig Jørgensen was born May 18, 1905, in Modum, Buskerud County, Sweden-Norway. His father moved to the United States shortly after his birth, settling in the Chicago area. Arndt, his mother, and his brother followed when he was two years old. The family shortened their name to "Jorgens" and became United States citizens.

Jorgens began playing baseball when he was six years old, playing as a catcher. He attended Lane Technical High School in Chicago. He played on the school's baseball team, and in 1923, they were the national preparatory baseball champions. After graduating from high school, Jorgens worked with his father and uncle in a furniture factory and played baseball as a semi-professional.

== Career ==
The Rock Island Islanders of the Class D Mississippi Valley League attempted to sign Jorgens for the 1925 season after major leaguers Freddie Lindstrom and Johnny Mostil saw him play as a semi-professional. With his father's permission, Jorgens signed with Rock Island before the 1926 season. The Oklahoma City Indians of the Class A Western League purchased Jorgens from Rock Island in August 1926 for a price believed to be between $1,000 to $1,500 (between $18,186 and $27,279 in current dollar terms), and he was to report to Oklahoma City after the season. He finished the 1926 season with Rock Island with a .302 batting average in 121 games played. Jorgens played for Oklahoma City in 1927 and 1928, batting .269 in 110 games in the 1927 season and .335 in 115 games for the 1928 season.

The New York Yankees purchased Jorgens from Oklahoma City on August 24, 1928, for $22,000 (equivalent to $412,500 in 2025). He was not to report to the Yankees until after the 1928 season. Due to a strong performance in spring training, Jorgens made the team for Opening Day of the 1929 season. Injuries limited the playing time of regular catchers Benny Bengough and Johnny Grabowski, but fellow rookie Bill Dickey received the majority of playing time at catcher. The Yankees optioned Jorgens to the Jersey City Skeeters of the Class AA International League in May and recalled him to the major leagues in September. He played in 18 games for the Yankees during the 1929 season, with a .324 batting average.

Jorgens began the 1930 season with the Yankees but was again optioned to the Skeeters in May. They promoted Jorgens back to the major leagues in August due to injuries to Dickey and Bubbles Hargrave. He played in 16 games for the Yankees during the 1930 season, in which he batted .367. After the 1930 season, the Yankees released Bengough and Hargrave, leaving Dickey and Jorgens as their only catchers. Jorgens became the Yankees' second-string catcher behind Dickey in the 1931 season, spending the entire season in the major leagues. He had a career-high .270 batting average in 46 games played in the 1931 season.

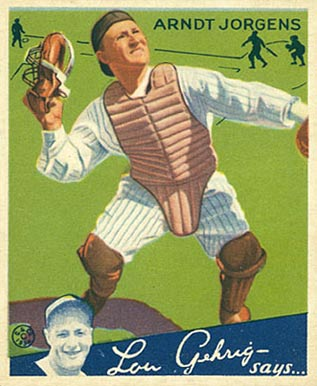
Jorgens's 1934 Goudey baseball card

During a game in July 1932, Dickey got into a fistfight with Carl Reynolds, breaking his jaw, and was suspended for a month. Jorgens became the Yankees' starting catcher during Dickey's suspension. In 26 games as the Yankees primary catcher, Jorgens hit .169. Dickey and Jorgens were the only two catchers for the Yankees during the 1932 World Series. Dickey played in all games and Jorgens did not play in the series, in which the Yankees defeated the Chicago Cubs in four games.

Jorgens' 1933 season ended prematurely in September when he was stricken by pneumonia. In August 1934, Dickey broke a bone in his throwing hand, resulting in Jorgens filling in as the primary catcher for 35 games. Jorgens posted career-highs with 38 hits, 20 runs batted in (RBIs), and 58 games played in 1934.

In 1935, Joe Glenn became the Yankees' backup catcher, relegating Jorgens to third string. The Washington Senators attempted to purchase Jorgens from the Yankees before the 1936 season, but were rebuffed. Jorgens played in 36 games during the 1936 season. He and Glenn were both on the Yankees roster for the 1936 World Series. The Yankees won against the New York Giants in six games, though neither Jorgens nor Glenn appeared in a game.

Jorgens played in 13 games in the 1937 season and the Yankees defeated the Giants in the 1937 World Series with Dickey starting all five games. Jorgens played in nine games in the 1938 season. In the 1938 World Series, the Yankees defeated the Chicago Cubs with Dickey starting all four games. The Yankees traded Glenn after the 1938 season and made Buddy Rosar their new backup catcher for the 1939 season. Jorgens played in three games in the 1939 season, without registering a single at bat. The Yankees advanced to the 1939 World Series and defeated the Cincinnati Reds in four games, with Dickey starting them all.

Jorgens was on the Yankees roster for the 1940 season, but he did not appear in a single game. After the season concluded, Jorgens retired from baseball. He had last appeared in a major league game on August 2, 1939. The Yankees reportedly kept Jorgens on the roster despite playing him so infrequently because Yankees manager Joe McCarthy liked Jorgens's attitude. In his major league career, Jorgens played in 306 games and had 738 at bats. He batted .238 with four home runs and 89 RBIs.

== Personal life ==
Jorgens married Madelyn Schultz. Together, they had a daughter. They lived in Wilmette, Illinois. After he retired from baseball, Jorgens accepted a job from Louis F. Schultz, his father-in-law, in the Schultz Brothers chain of variety stores.

His brother Orville Jorgens, who was five years younger than Arndt, also played in the major leagues.

Jorgens died on March 1, 1980, at Evanston Hospital in Evanston, Illinois. He is buried in Memorial Park Cemetery, Skokie, Illinois.

== See also ==
- List of Major League Baseball players who spent their entire career with one franchise
