= Earl Grace =

American baseball player (1907–1980)

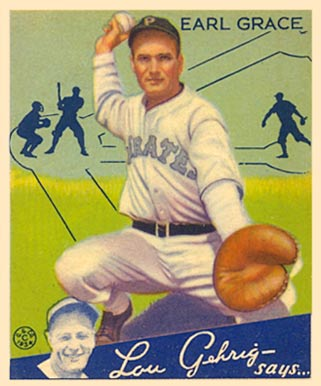
- Catcher
- Born: February 24, 1907; Barlow, Kentucky, U.S.
- Died: December 22, 1980 (aged 73); Phoenix, Arizona, U.S.
- Batted: Left Threw: Right

MLB debut
- April 23, 1929, for the Chicago Cubs

Last MLB appearance
- October 3, 1937, for the Philadelphia Phillies

MLB statistics
- Batting average: .263
- Home runs: 31
- Runs batted in: 251
- Stats at Baseball Reference

Teams
- Chicago Cubs (1929, 1931); Pittsburgh Pirates (1931–1935); Philadelphia Phillies (1936–1937)

Robert Earl Grace (February 24, 1907 – December 22, 1980) was an American professional baseball player and coach. He played as a catcher in Major League Baseball (MLB) from 1929 through 1937 for the Chicago Cubs, Pittsburgh Pirates, and Philadelphia Phillies. During World War II, 1LT Robert E. Grace served as baseball coach for servicemen assigned to the Welch Army Convalescent Center in Daytona Beach.

== Early minor league career ==
Grace's professional career began in 1925, playing for the Lincoln Links and Little Rock Travelers. After playing for the Muskogee Athletics in 1927. He played for the Travelers again in 1928, then he was signed by the Chicago Cubs organization, where he started the season with the Reading Keystones.

== Major league career ==
=== Chicago Cubs ===
Grace made his major league debut for the Chicago Cubs in 1929, playing in 27 games and batting .250. After a season back in the minor leagues with the Keystones, he returned to the Cubs for 7 games in 1931 before being traded to the Pittsburgh Pirates for fellow catcher Rollie Hemsley.

=== Pittsburgh Pirates ===
After batting .280 in 47 games for the Pirates after the trade, Grace was made the Pirate's regular catcher in 1932. He finished the season having committed only 1 error in 413 total chances, to establish a National League fielding record with a .998 fielding percentage, breaking the record set by Shanty Hogan just one year earlier. Over the next three seasons, Grace's playing time decreased in favor of Tom Padden, and after the 1935 season, he was traded along with pitcher Claude Passeau for another fellow catcher, Al Todd.

=== Philadelphia Phillies ===
Grace played two seasons for the Phillies, splitting time with Jimmie Wilson and Bill Atwood, Grace was traded a third time. Like each of the previous two trades, he was traded for another catcher, this time to the St. Louis Browns for Cap Clark. However, Grace never played for the Browns after the trade. Instead, he returned to minor league baseball, splitting the 1938 season between the Minneapolis Millers and the Columbus Red Birds. He continued to play in the minors until 1940.

== Sources ==
- Career statistics from Baseball Reference · Baseball Reference (Minors) · Retrosheet · Baseball Almanac
