= Herb Harris =

American baseball player (1913–1991)

- Pitcher
- Born: April 24, 1913; Chicago, Illinois, U.S.
- Died: January 18, 1991 (aged 77); Crystal Lake, Illinois, U.S.
- Batted: Left Threw: Left

MLB debut
- July 21, 1936, for the Philadelphia Phillies

Last MLB appearance
- August 2, 1936, for the Philadelphia Phillies

MLB statistics
- Win–loss record: 0–0
- Earned run average: 10.29
- Strikeouts: 0
- Stats at Baseball Reference

Teams
- Philadelphia Phillies (1936)

Herbert Benjamin Harris (April 24, 1913 – January 18, 1991) was an American Major League Baseball pitcher. Born in Chicago, Illinois, he attended college at Northwestern University, pitching and playing outfield for the Wildcats. He played four games in his MLB career, in 1936 with the Philadelphia Phillies posting a career 10.29 ERA.

Harris originally signed with the Chicago Cubs out of college in 1934. Prior to his MLB debut, Harris played for the Ponca City Angels in the Western Association in 1934, the Los Angeles Angels in the Pacific Coast League in 1935, and the Des Moines Demons in the Western League in 1936. Harris also played in the outfield for Des Moines.

Harris appeared as a relief pitcher in his four games for the 1936 Phillies, all losses for the team. He pitched five scoreless innings over his first two appearances before allowing 8 runs in two innings in his last two MLB games. In his final appearance, he faced several Hall of Famers, giving up singles to Frankie Frisch and Johnny Mize and walking Leo Durocher and retiring pitcher Jesse Haines twice on groundouts in a loss to the St. Louis Cardinals.

Harris died on January 18, 1991, in Crystal Lake, Illinois.
