= Leo Norris =

American baseball player (1908-1987)

- Infielder
- Born: May 17, 1908; Bay St. Louis, Mississippi, U.S.
- Died: May 13, 1987 (aged 78); Zachary, Louisiana, U.S.
- Batted: Right Threw: Right

MLB debut
- April 14, 1936, for the Philadelphia Phillies

Last MLB appearance
- October 3, 1937, for the Philadelphia Phillies

MLB statistics
- Batting average: .262
- Home runs: 20
- Runs batted in: 112
- Stats at Baseball Reference

Teams
- Philadelphia Phillies (1936–1937)

Leo John Norris (May 17, 1908 - May 13, 1987) was an American Major League Baseball player for the Philadelphia Phillies in the 1936–1937 seasons. He was 5 ft 11 in (1.80 m) and weighed 165 lbs. He was born in Bay St. Louis, Mississippi and he died in Zachary, Louisiana.
