= Jimmy Wilson (baseball) =

American baseball player

- Outfielder
- Born: January 28, 1920; Newberry, South Carolina, U.S.
- Died: May 2, 1997 (aged 77); Woonsocket, Rhode Island, U.S.
- Batted: Right Threw: Right

Negro league baseball debut
- 1940, for the Indianapolis Crawfords

Last appearance
- 1941, for the Birmingham Black Barons

Teams
- Indianapolis Crawfords (1940); Birmingham Black Barons (1940–1941)

James Wilson (January 28, 1920 – May 2, 1997), nicknamed "Nip", was an American Negro league outfielder in the 1940s.

A native of Newberry, South Carolina, Wilson made his Negro leagues debut in 1940 with the Indianapolis Crawfords and Birmingham Black Barons. He played for Birmingham again in 1941, his final professional season. Wilson died in Woonsocket, Rhode Island in 1997 at age 77.
