= Van Lingle Mungo =

American baseball player

Van Mungo
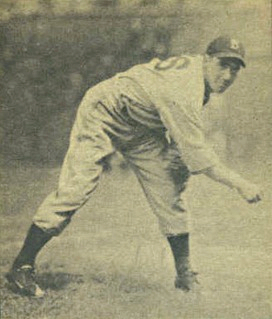
- Pitcher
- Born: June 8, 1911; Pageland, South Carolina, U.S.
- Died: February 12, 1985 (aged 73); Pageland, South Carolina, U.S.
- Batted: Right Threw: Right

MLB debut
- September 7, 1931, for the Brooklyn Robins

Last MLB appearance
- September 2, 1945, for the New York Giants

MLB statistics
- Win–loss record: 120–115
- Earned run average: 3.47
- Strikeouts: 1,242
- Stats at Baseball Reference

Teams
- Brooklyn Robins / Dodgers (1931–1941); New York Giants (1942–1943, 1945)

Career highlights and awards
- 5× All-Star (1934, 1935, 1936, 1937, 1945); NL strikeout leader (1936)

Van Lingle Mungo (June 8, 1911 – February 12, 1985) was an American professional baseball player. He played in Major League Baseball as a right-handed pitcher from 1931 to 1945 for the Brooklyn Dodgers and the New York Giants. The five-time All-Star was the National League strikeout leader in 1936. Mungo was a colorful personality known for his off-field antics as well as his erratic fastball.

== Career ==
Mungo was born in Pageland, South Carolina, the son of Martha Lingle and Henry Van Mungo. He began his professional baseball career with the Charlotte Hornets at age 18. A succession of managers over the years, including Casey Stengel, was convinced that the hard-throwing right-hander would be a surefire star for years to come, an expectation fostered by a phenomenal debut performance in which he shut out the Boston Braves over 9 innings, striking out 12, but he was never able to live up to his perceived potential. While he finished his career with two 18-win seasons, one of them also included 19 losses. Mungo's teammates contended that he could have easily won more games, had he not tried to strike out every batter; Mungo countered that he would not have tried to strike everyone out if he had more confidence in his teammates' fielding abilities.

Mungo averaged 16 wins per season from 1932 through 1936, led the National League in strikeouts with 238 in 1936. He was named to the All-Star team in 1934, 1936, and 1937. Though his strikeout counts were impressive, he led the league in walks in 1932, 1934 and 1936. Following an arm injury in 1937, he won only 13 games over the next six seasons. After a spring training injury in 1943, he was released by the Dodgers and played his final season with the Giants. He completed his major league career with a 120–115 won–loss record over 2113 innings pitched and a 3.47 earned run average.

Mungo was an above-average hitting pitcher in his major league career. He posted a .221 batting average (174-for-787) with 56 runs, 24 doubles, 4 triples, 74 RBI and 29 bases on balls. He did not hit any home runs. He was used as a pinch-hitter 25 times. Defensively, he recorded a .960 fielding percentage which was about the league average at his position.

== Character ==
Stories and anecdotes about Mungo tend to emphasize his reputation for combativeness, including episodes of drinking and fighting. "Mungo and I got along just fine," reported Casey Stengel, his manager on the Dodgers. "I just tell him I won't stand for no nonsense, and then I duck." The most widely told story concerns a visit to Cuba where, supposedly, Mungo was caught in a compromising position with a married woman by her husband. Mungo punched the husband in the eye, leading him to attack Mungo with a butcher knife or machete, requiring Dodgers executive Babe Hamberger to smuggle Mungo in a laundry cart to a seaplane waiting off a wharf in order to escape the country.

Van Mungo was not just a pistol off the field; on the field he was bent towards conflict with his own team. There are several stories of run-ins and conflict with his teammates and managers. Once while he was protecting a small margin of victory, outfielder Tom Winsett botched a routine fly-ball that cost Mungo a victory. Mungo retreated to the dugout and clubhouse to destroy what he could destroy and throw into the field of play what he could not destroy. Mungo sent his wife a telegram stating the following: "Pack up your bags and come to Brooklyn, honey. If Winsett can play in the big leagues, it's a cinch you can, too." It is also true that Van Lingle Mungo probably paid more in fines than any player of his era, amassing a grand total (in his own estimation) of over $15,000.

== Song ==
Mungo returned to the public eye in 1969 because of the use of his prosodic name as the title of a novelty song by Dave Frishberg. The song lyrics consist entirely of the names of baseball players of the 1940s. Mungo is one of only five players mentioned more than once and his name functions as a kind of refrain. According to Frishberg, The Dick Cavett Show arranged to have him sing the song to Mungo in person, and Mungo asked him backstage if there would ever be any financial remuneration for the use of his name in the song. Frishberg told him no, but maybe Mungo could make some money if he wrote a song called "Dave Frishberg". Today, Mungo is remembered primarily because of the song.

== Baseball legacy ==
More famous for his managerial career, former pitcher Tommy Lasorda was given the nickname "Mungo" because of his "lightning fastball" and his ability to strike out batters.

== Retirement ==
Mungo returned to his hometown of Pageland, South Carolina, after retiring in 1945, and lived there until his death from a heart attack in 1985. He purchased and operated a movie house called the Ball Theatre, and had a balcony built to accommodate people of color, who had previously been denied access to the facility.

== See also ==
- List of Major League Baseball annual strikeout leaders
- List of Major League Baseball annual shutout leaders
- List of Major League Baseball career ERA leaders

Sporting positions
| Preceded by Watty Clark; George Earnshaw | Brooklyn Dodgers Opening Day; Starting pitcher 1934–1935; 1937–1938 | Succeeded by George Earnshaw; Red Evans |
