= Ernie Sulik =

American baseball player (1910-1963)

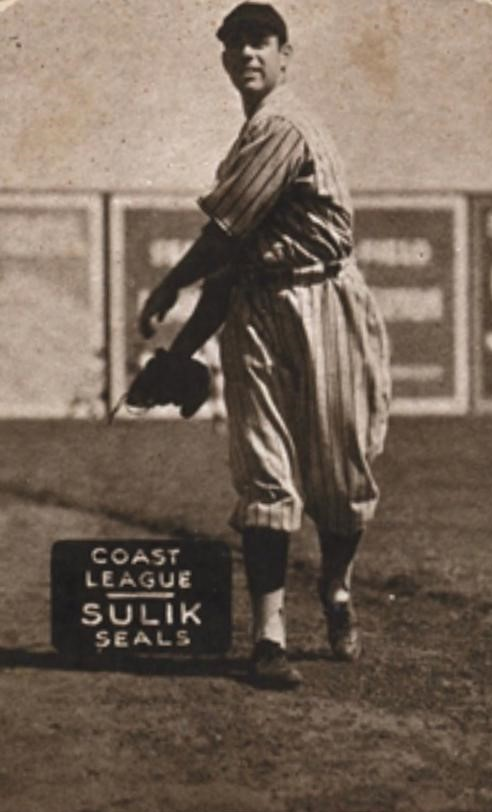
- Outfielder
- Born: July 7, 1910; San Francisco, California, U.S.
- Died: May 31, 1963 (aged 52); Oakland, California, U.S.
- Batted: Left Threw: Left

MLB debut
- April 15, 1936, for the Philadelphia Phillies

Last MLB appearance
- September 27, 1936, for the Philadelphia Phillies

MLB statistics
- Batting average: .287
- Home runs: 6
- Runs batted in: 36
- Stats at Baseball Reference

Teams
- Philadelphia Phillies (1936)

Ernest Richard Sulik (July 7, 1910 – May 31, 1963) was an American Major League Baseball (MLB) outfielder who played in 1936 with the Philadelphia Phillies. He batted and threw left-handed.

He was born in San Francisco, California and died in Oakland, California.
