= Frank Demaree =

American baseball player (1910–1958)

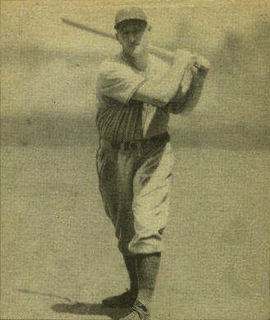
- Outfielder
- Born: June 10, 1910; Winters, California, U.S.
- Died: August 30, 1958 (aged 48); Los Angeles, California, U.S.
- Batted: Right Threw: Right

MLB debut
- July 22, 1932, for the Chicago Cubs

Last MLB appearance
- June 13, 1944, for the St. Louis Browns

MLB statistics
- Batting average: .299
- Home runs: 72
- Runs batted in: 591
- Stats at Baseball Reference

Teams
- Chicago Cubs (1932–1933, 1935–1938); New York Giants (1939–1941); Boston Braves (1941–1942); St. Louis Cardinals (1943); St. Louis Browns (1944)

Career highlights and awards
- 2× All-Star (1936, 1937)

Joseph Franklin Demaree (June 10, 1910 – August 30, 1958) was an American professional baseball outfielder. He played all or part of twelve seasons in the majors for the Chicago Cubs (1932–33, 1935–38), New York Giants (1939–41), Boston Braves (1941–42), St. Louis Cardinals (1943) and St. Louis Browns (1944).

== Career highlights ==
Demaree is one of four Pacific Coast League hitters to have had a 30 home runs, 30 stolen bases season (in 1934, in 186 games), along with Joc Pederson (2014, in 115 games), Lefty O'Doul (1927), and Hall of Famer Tony Lazzeri (1925).

Demaree helped the Cubs win the National League pennant in 1932, 1935 and 1938. He hit a home run against the New York Yankees in the final game of the 1932 World Series. He also homered in Game 1 of the 1935 World Series.

During his only season with the Cardinals, they won the National League pennant in 1943. During his last season, he helped the Browns win the American League pennant. He was named to the National League All-Star Team in 1936 and 1937.

He finished 7th in voting for the 1936 National League MVP for playing in 154 games, having 605 at-bats, 93 runs, 212 hits, 34 doubles, 3 triples, 16 home runs, 96 RBI, 4 stolen bases, 49 walks, .350 batting average, .400 on-base percentage, .496 slugging percentage, 300 total bases and 17 sacrifice fits.

He finished 15th in voting for the 1937 National League MVP for playing in 154 games, having 615 at-bats, 104 runs, 199 hits, 36 doubles, 6 triples, 17 home runs, 115 RBI, 6 stolen bases, 57 walks, .324 batting average, .382 on-base percentage, .485 slugging percentage, 298 total bases and 14 sacrifice hits.

On July 5, 1937, Demaree went 6-for-7 for the Cubs against the Cardinals in a 13-12, 14 inning victory at Wrigley Field.

He also led the National League in grounding into double plays (23) in 1937.

In a 12-year, 1155 game career, Demaree posted a .299 batting average (1241–4144) with 578 runs, 72 home runs and 591 RBI. His on-base percentage was .357 and slugging percentage was .415. He compiled a .978 fielding percentage at all three outfield positions. He hit over .300 five times.

Demaree is an inductee in the Pacific Coast League Hall of Fame.

== See also ==
- List of Major League Baseball single-game hits leaders

== Sources ==
- Career statistics from MLB · ESPN · Baseball Reference · Fangraphs · Baseball Reference (Minors) · Retrosheet · Baseball Almanac
- Media related to Frank Demaree at Wikimedia Commons
