= Stephanie Pfirman =

Geoscientist

- Education: Woods Hole Oceanographic Institution; Massachusetts Institute of Technology
- Scientific career
- Thesis: Modern sedimentation in the northern Barents Sea : input, dispersal, and deposition of suspended sediments from glacial meltwater (1985)

Stephanie Louise Pfirman is a professor at Arizona State University known for her work on sea ice, pollutants in sea ice, and how sea ice is changing over time. She is a fellow of the American Association for the Advancement of Science.

== Education and career ==
Pfirman graduated from Roy C. Ketcham High School in New York and then received her B.A. from Colgate University in 1978. Following colleges she worked at the United States Geological Survey. She then earned her Ph.D. from Woods Hole Oceanographic Institution and Massachusetts Institute of Technology in 1985. Following her Ph.D. she worked at GEOMAR Helmholtz Centre for Ocean Research Kiel and then the Environmental Defense Fund where she was scientific coordinator for an exhibition on global warming that was presented at the American Museum of Natural History from May 1992 until January 1993. In 1993 she moved to Barnard College where she ultimately held the position of Alena Wels Hirschorn '58 and Martin Hirschorn Professor of Environmental and Applied Sciences. In 2018 she move to Arizona State University where, as of 2022, she is a professor.

== Research ==
Pfirman is known for her research on Arctic sea ice and the impact of global warming. Her early research examined glacial melting, sediment on Arctic ice, and transport of pollutants by sea ice. She has used her research on the movement of ice packs in the Arctic to consider how the voyages of Fridtjof Nansen and Ernest Shackleton may have been different if ice floes took a different path through the Arctic. Pfirman has examined decreases in sea ice in the Arctic, and developed games to teach people about global warming. Beyond academic research, Pfirman has examined how women make the decision to conduct Interdisciplinary research, and suggested and co-chaired the River Summer program that brought teachers to do hands-on studies of the Hudson River.

== Selected publications ==
- Pfirman, S.; Lange, M. A.; Wollenburg, I.; Schlosser, P. (1990), "Sea Ice Characteristics and the Role of Sediment Inclusions in Deep-Sea Deposition: Arctic — Antarctic Comparisons", in Bleil, Ulrich; Thiede, Jörn (eds.), Geological History of the Polar Oceans: Arctic versus Antarctic, Dordrecht: Springer Netherlands, pp. 187–211, doi:10.1007/978-94-009-2029-3_11, ISBN 978-94-010-7410-0
- Pfirman, S. L.; Eicken, H.; Bauch, D.; Weeks, W. F. (1995-01-10). "The potential transport of pollutants by Arctic sea ice". Science of the Total Environment. 159 (2): 129–146. Bibcode:1995ScTEn.159..129P. doi:10.1016/0048-9697(95)04174-Y. ISSN 0048-9697.
- Pavlov, V. K.; Pfirman, S. L. (1995-01-01). "Hydrographic structure and variability of the Kara Sea: Implications for pollutant distribution". Deep Sea Research Part II: Topical Studies in Oceanography. 42 (6): 1369–1390. Bibcode:1995DSRII..42.1369P. doi:10.1016/0967-0645(95)00046-1. ISSN 0967-0645.
- Pfirman, S. L.; Colony, R.; Nürnberg, D.; Eicken, H.; Rigor, I. (1997-06-15). "Reconstructing the origin and trajectory of drifting Arctic sea ice". Journal of Geophysical Research: Oceans. 102 (C6): 12575–12586. Bibcode:1997JGR...10212575P. doi:10.1029/96JC03980.
- Rhoten, Diana; Pfirman, Stephanie (2007-02-01). "Women in interdisciplinary science: Exploring preferences and consequences". Research Policy. 36 (1): 56–75. doi:10.1016/j.respol.2006.08.001. ISSN 0048-7333.

== Awards and honors ==
In 2009 Phirman was elected to the American Association for the Advancement of Science.
