= Orville Jorgens =

American baseball player (1908–1992)

- Pitcher
- Born: June 4, 1908; Rockford, Illinois, U.S.
- Died: January 11, 1992 (aged 83); Colorado Springs, Colorado, U.S.
- Batted: Right Threw: Right

MLB debut
- April 19, 1935, for the Philadelphia Phillies

Last MLB appearance
- September 26, 1937, for the Philadelphia Phillies

MLB statistics
- Win–loss record: 21–27
- Earned run average: 4.70
- Strikeouts: 149
- Stats at Baseball Reference

Teams
- Philadelphia Phillies (1935–1937)

Orville Edward Jorgens (June 4, 1908 – January 11, 1992) was an American professional baseball player. He was a pitcher in Major League Baseball for the Philadelphia Phillies from 1935 to 1937. He batted and threw right-handed. Jorgens was the brother of fellow Major Leaguer Arndt Jorgens.

In three MLB seasons, Jorgens compiled a 21–27 win–loss record, striking out 149, and walking 233.

Jorgens was born in Rockford, Illinois, and died in Colorado Springs, Colorado.
