= Walt Bashore =

American baseball player (1909–1984)

- Outfielder
- Born: October 6, 1909; Harrisburg, Pennsylvania, U.S.
- Died: September 26, 1984 (aged 74); Sebring, Florida, U.S.
- Batted: Right Threw: Right

MLB debut
- July 14, 1936, for the Philadelphia Phillies

Last MLB appearance
- August 7, 1936, for the Philadelphia Phillies

MLB statistics
- Games played: 10
- At bats: 10
- Hits: 2
- Stats at Baseball Reference

Teams
- Philadelphia Phillies (1936)

Walter Franklin Bashore (October 6, 1909 – September 26, 1984), born Walter Franklin Beshore, was an American Major League Baseball outfielder. Bashore played for the Philadelphia Phillies in the 1936 season. In 10 career games, he had 2 hits in 10 at-bats. He batted and threw right-handed.

Bashore was born in Harrisburg, Pennsylvania and died in Sebring, Florida.
