= Cy Pfirman =

American baseball umpire (1889-1937)

- Born: Charles H. Pfirman; February 27, 1889; Cincinnati, Ohio, US
- Died: May 16, 1937 (aged 48); New Orleans, Louisiana, US
- Occupation: Umpire
- Years active: 1922–1936
- Employer: National League

Charles H. "Cy" Pfirman (February 27, 1889 – May 16, 1937) was an American professional baseball umpire who worked in the National League from 1922 to 1936. Pfirman umpired 2,241 major league games in his 15-year career. He also umpired in three World Series (1928, 1933 and 1936) and the 1934 Major League Baseball All-Star Game.

== Early life and career ==
Pfirman was born in Cincinnati. As a young boy, he served as a bat boy for a minor league baseball team in the Illinois–Indiana–Iowa League. He never played professional baseball, but he became an umpire in the Kentucky–Indiana–Tennessee League by the age of 19. Before making it as a major league umpire, Pfirman worked in the Missouri-Illinois League, Central League, Central Association, Ohio State League, New York State League, International League, Texas League and Southern League.

== Major league umpiring career ==
In 1922, Pfirman was promoted to the National League. At one point he umpired 1,710 consecutive major league games. He was the plate umpire in the 1934 All-Star Game when Carl Hubbell struck out Babe Ruth, Lou Gehrig, Jimmie Foxx, Al Simmons and Joe Cronin one after another.

== Personal life ==
Pfirman's son Dwight umpired in the minor leagues.

== Death ==
Pfirman became ill with kidney problems during spring training in 1937, which would have been his sixteenth major league season. He died in May of that year after spending several weeks at a New Orleans hospital.

== See also ==
- List of Major League Baseball umpires (disambiguation)
