= Peaches Davis =

American baseball player (1905–1995)

- Pitcher
- Born: May 31, 1905; Glen Rose, Texas, U.S.
- Died: April 28, 1995 (aged 89); Duncan, Oklahoma, U.S.
- Batted: Left Threw: Right

MLB debut
- July 11, 1936, for the Cincinnati Reds

Last MLB appearance
- August 17, 1939, for the Cincinnati Reds

MLB statistics
- Win–loss record: 27–33
- Earned run average: 3.87
- Strikeouts: 123
- Stats at Baseball Reference

Teams
- Cincinnati Reds (1936–1939)

Roy Thomas "Peaches" Davis (May 31, 1905 – April 28, 1995) was an American Major League Baseball (MLB) pitcher from 1936 to 1939. He played for the Cincinnati Reds.

Davis' family moved to Duncan, Oklahoma as a child. Davis graduated from Duncan High School and played football at Oklahoma Baptist.

Davis began his professional baseball career with the Class A Topeka Jayhawks of the Western League in 1929. After seven years of minor league baseball, he made his MLB debut with the Reds on July 11, 1936. His final game with the Reds came on August 17, 1939. He returned to minor league baseball for the 1940–42 and 1945 seasons.

Born in Glen Rose, Texas, Davis died in Duncan, a month short of his 90th birthday.
