= Hal Finney (baseball) =

American baseball player (1905–1991)

- Catcher
- Born: July 30, 1905; Lafayette, Alabama, U.S.
- Died: December 20, 1991 (aged 86); Lafayette, Alabama, U.S.
- Batted: Right Threw: Right

MLB debut
- June 24, 1931, for the Pittsburgh Pirates

Last MLB appearance
- September 27, 1936, for the Pittsburgh Pirates

MLB statistics
- Batting average: .203
- Home runs: 1
- Runs batted in: 27
- Stats at Baseball Reference

Teams
- Pittsburgh Pirates (1931–34, 1936)

Harold Wilson Finney (July 30, 1905 – December 22, 1991) was an American Major League Baseball catcher. He played all or part of five seasons in the majors, between 1931 and 1936, for the Pittsburgh Pirates. During the 1922 season, he appeared in six games, exclusively as a pinch runner.

Finney held the record for non-pitchers for most at bats in a season without a hit. In 1936, Finney went 0-for-35, with an on-base percentage of .000 as well. This was the overall record for most at bats with a .000 OBP until 2008, when it was broken by pitcher Jason Bergmann. He did score 3 runs and have 3 RBI in his last major league season. Dodgers's infielder Eugenio Vélez finished the 2011 season hitless in 37 at-bats to break Finney's record.

Finney was the brother of fellow major leaguer Lou Finney.
