= Joe Bowman (baseball) =

American baseball player (1910–1990)

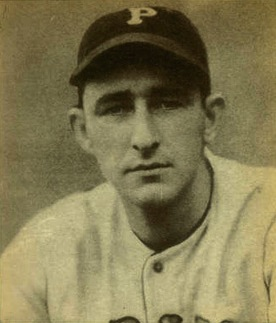
- Pitcher
- Born: June 17, 1910; Kansas City, Kansas, U.S.
- Died: November 22, 1990 (aged 80); Kansas City, Missouri, U.S.
- Batted: Left Threw: Right

MLB debut
- April 18, 1932, for the Philadelphia Athletics

Last MLB appearance
- September 29, 1945, for the Cincinnati Reds

MLB statistics
- Win–loss record: 77–96
- Earned run average: 4.40
- Strikeouts: 502
- Stats at Baseball Reference

Teams
- Philadelphia Athletics (1932); New York Giants (1934); Philadelphia Phillies (1935–1936); Pittsburgh Pirates (1937–1941); Boston Red Sox (1944–1945); Cincinnati Reds (1945)

Joseph Emil Bowman (June 17, 1910 – November 22, 1990) was an American professional baseball pitcher. He played in Major League Baseball for the Philadelphia Athletics, New York Giants, Philadelphia Phillies, Pittsburgh Pirates, Boston Red Sox, and Cincinnati Reds.

A starter most of his career, Bowman also filled various relief roles coming out from the bullpen, as a closer or a middle reliever, and as a set-up man as well. He reached the majors in 1932 with the Philadelphia Athletics, spending one year with them before moving to the New York Giants (1934), Philadelphia Phillies (1935–37), Pittsburgh Pirates (1937–41), Boston Red Sox (1944–45) and Cincinnati Reds (1945). He was one of two 20-game losers with the last-place 1936 Phillies, but won 39 games in five seasons for Pittsburgh. He went 12–8 with Boston in 1944 and won 11 games for Cincinnati in 1945, his last major league season. Often used as a pinch hitter, he hit .333 in 1938 and .344 in 1939.

In an 11-season career, Bowman posted a 77–96 record with a 4.40 ERA and 11 saves in 298 appearances, including 184 starts, 74 complete games, five shutouts, and 1465 2/3 innings pitched. As a hitter, he collected a .221 batting average (141-for-639) with two home runs and 75 RBI in 430 games.

After his playing career, Joe Bowman was a minor league player and manager before becoming a successful baseball scout. Bowman was the Scouting Director for Charlie Finley's Kansas City A's from 1960 to 1968. In that role, Bowman was instrumental in assembling a scouting staff and finding the players who would become the core of the Oakland Athletics' three World Series Champion teams from 1972 to 1974. When the A's moved to Oakland in 1968, Bowman decided to stay home in Kansas City where he became a regional scout first for the Atlanta Braves for a brief time before a long stint scouting for the Baltimore Orioles.
