= Stan Sperry =

American baseball player (1914–1962)

- Second baseman
- Born: February 19, 1914; Evansville, Wisconsin
- Died: September 27, 1962 (aged 48); Evansville, Wisconsin
- Batted: Left Threw: Right

MLB debut
- July 28, 1936, for the Philadelphia Phillies

Last MLB appearance
- September 29, 1938, for the Philadelphia Athletics

MLB statistics
- Batting average: .255
- Home runs: 0
- Runs batted in: 31
- Stats at Baseball Reference

Teams
- Philadelphia Phillies (1936); Philadelphia Athletics (1938)

Stanley Kenneth Sperry (February 19, 1914 – September 27, 1962) was a second baseman in Major League Baseball. He played for the Philadelphia Phillies and Philadelphia Athletics.
