= Watty Clark =

American baseball player (1902–1972)

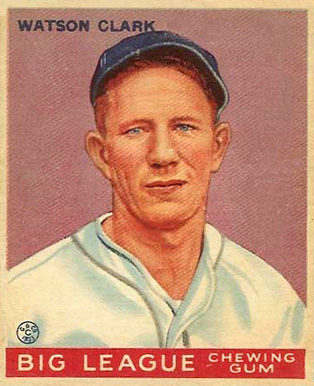
- Pitcher
- Born: May 16, 1902; St. Joseph, Louisiana, U.S.
- Died: March 4, 1972 (aged 69); Clearwater, Florida, U.S.
- Batted: Left Threw: Left

MLB debut
- May 28, 1924, for the Cleveland Indians

Last MLB appearance
- May 9, 1937, for the Brooklyn Dodgers

MLB statistics
- Win–loss record: 111–97
- Earned run average: 3.66
- Strikeouts: 643
- Stats at Baseball Reference

Teams
- Cleveland Indians (1924); Brooklyn Robins / Dodgers (1927–1933); New York Giants (1933–1934); Brooklyn Dodgers (1934–1937)

William Watson Clark (May 16, 1902 – March 4, 1972) was an American professional baseball pitcher for the Cleveland Indians (1924), Brooklyn Robins/Dodgers (1927–33 and 1934–37) and New York Giants (1933–34).

Clark finished 20th in voting for the 1931 National League MVP for having a 14–10 win–loss record, 34 games (28 started), 16 complete games, 3 shutouts, 2 games finished, 1 save, 233 1/3 innings pitched, 243 hits allowed, 86 runs allowed, 83 earned runs allowed, 4 home runs allowed, 52 walks, 96 strikeouts, 1 hit batsman, 3 wild pitches, 981 batters faced, 1 balk, 3.20 ERA and 1.264 WHIP. He led the National League in walks/9 IP in 1930 (1.71) and 1935 (1.22), innings in 1929 (279), games started in 1929 (36) and 1932 (36), hits allowed in 1929 (295), losses in 1929 (19) and batters faced in 1929 (1,189). He ranks 81st on the Major League Baseball career walks/9 IP list (1.97). He also holds the Dodgers single season record for walks/9 IP (1.22 in 1935).

In 12 seasons, he had a 111–97 win–loss record, 355 games (206 started), 91 complete games, 14 shutouts, 84 games finished, 16 saves, 1,747 1/3 innings pitched, 1,897 hits allowed, 836 runs allowed, 711 earned runs allowed, 86 home runs allowed, 383 walks allowed, 643 strikeouts, 17 hit batsmen, 21 wild pitches, 7,442 batters faced, 2 balks, 3.66 ERA and 1.305 WHIP.

As a hitter, Clark posted a .196 batting average (117-for-598) with 49 runs, 1 home run, 38 RBI and 33 bases on balls. Defensively, he was better than average, he recorded a .976 fielding percentage which was 16 points higher than the league average at his position.

Clark died at the age of 69 in Clearwater, Florida.

Preceded by Jesse Petty	Brooklyn Robins Opening Day; Starting pitcher 1929–1930	Succeeded by Jack Quinn
Preceded by Waite Hoyt	Brooklyn Dodgers Opening Day; Starting pitcher 1933	Succeeded by Van Mungo
