= Syl Johnson (baseball) =

American baseball player (1900–1985)

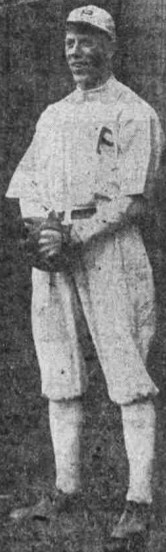
- Pitcher
- Born: December 31, 1900; Portland, Oregon, U.S.
- Died: February 20, 1985 (aged 84); Portland, Oregon, U.S.
- Batted: Right Threw: Right

MLB debut
- April 24, 1922, for the Detroit Tigers

Last MLB appearance
- September 14, 1940, for the Philadelphia Phillies

MLB statistics
- Win–loss record: 112–117
- Earned run average: 4.06
- Strikeouts: 920
- Stats at Baseball Reference

Teams
- Detroit Tigers (1922–1925); St. Louis Cardinals (1926–1933); Cincinnati Reds (1934); Philadelphia Phillies (1934–1940)

Career highlights and awards
- World Series champion (1931)

Sylvester W. Johnson, né Sylvester Johnson (December 31, 1900 – February 20, 1985) was an American Major League Baseball (MLB) pitcher.

Johnson's career lasted from 1922 to 1940 and he played for the St. Louis Cardinals, Cincinnati Reds, Detroit Tigers, and Philadelphia Phillies. In an emergency, he was the third base umpire in a game between the Brooklyn Dodgers and the Cincinnati Reds. He was a coach for the Phillies from 1937 to 1941. An early proponent of a pension plan for players, his proposal to Commissioner Kenesaw Mountain Landis was rejected although a pension plan was approved in 1947. He was inducted into the Oregon Sports Hall of Fame in 1981.

Johnson died on February 20, 1985, aged 84, leaving his wife of 62 years, Ruth Heitsman Johnson.
