= Ralph Birkofer =

American baseball player (1908–1971)

- Pitcher
- Born: November 5, 1908; Cincinnati, Ohio, U.S.
- Died: March 16, 1971 (aged 62); Cincinnati, Ohio, U.S.
- Batted: Left Threw: Left

MLB debut
- April 25, 1933, for the Pittsburgh Pirates

Last MLB appearance
- July 11, 1937, for the Brooklyn Dodgers

MLB statistics
- Win–loss record: 31–28
- Earned run average: 4.19
- Strikeouts: 224
- Stats at Baseball Reference

Teams
- Pittsburgh Pirates (1933–1936); Brooklyn Dodgers (1937)

Ralph Joseph Birkofer (November 5, 1908 – March 16, 1971) was an American Major League Baseball pitcher for the Pittsburgh Pirates and Brooklyn Dodgers. His two main pitches were a sinking fastball and a curve.
