= Mace Brown =

American baseball player (1909–2002)

- Pitcher
- Born: May 21, 1909; North English, Iowa, U.S.
- Died: March 24, 2002 (aged 92); Greensboro, North Carolina, U.S.
- Batted: Right Threw: Right

MLB debut
- May 21, 1935, for the Pittsburgh Pirates

Last MLB appearance
- September 10, 1946, for the Boston Red Sox

MLB statistics
- Win–loss record: 76–57
- Earned run average: 3.46
- Strikeouts: 435
- Saves: 48
- Stats at Baseball Reference

Teams
- Pittsburgh Pirates (1935–1941); Brooklyn Dodgers (1941); Boston Red Sox (1942–1943, 1946)

Career highlights and awards
- All-Star (1938)

Mace Stanley Brown (May 21, 1909 – March 24, 2002) was an American professional baseball player, scout and coach. He appeared in Major League Baseball, largely as a relief pitcher, over ten seasons (1935–1943; 1946) for the Pittsburgh Pirates, Brooklyn Dodgers and Boston Red Sox. Brown posted a 76–57 record with a 3.46 ERA and 44 saves in 387 appearances (55 as a starter).

== Playing career ==
Brown was also a javelin thrower who attended the University of Iowa on a track scholarship. He started his professional baseball career after college. In 1934, he won 19 games for the Tulsa Oilers of the Texas League and was purchased by the Pirates in November.

Brown became known as one of the first full-time relief specialists in the Major Leagues. In 1938, he led the Pirates with 15 wins (all in relief), led the National League with 51 games pitched, and became the first reliever to play the All-Star Game. In 1943, with the Red Sox, he also led the American League in games pitched with 49.

However, Brown is also known for giving up the Homer in the Gloamin', the home run that cost the Pirates their lead in the 1938 National League pennant race. On September 28, 1938, the Pirates were playing the Chicago Cubs, who trailed the Pirates by just one-half game in the league standings. Brown entered the game with the teams tied 5–5 in the bottom of the ninth inning. Darkness was falling fast, and the Cubs' Wrigley Field had no lights, meaning the game could end in a tie. But Gabby Hartnett soon smacked a pitch from Brown over the left-center field wall, giving the Cubs the victory and propelling them into first place. The Pirates proceeded to lose four of their final five games, securing the Cubs' hold on the pennant.

Brown missed the 1944 and 1945 seasons while serving as Lieutenant junior grade in the United States Navy during World War II.

== Scout and coach ==
Following his playing career, Brown served as a coach and North Carolina–based scout for the Red Sox organization from 1947 through 1989. He was the Major League pitching coach for the 1965 Red Sox, serving on the staff of manager Billy Herman, who was the Cubs' starting second baseman in the "Homer in the Gloamin'" game.

As a spring training coach for the Red Sox, Brown worked with both pitchers and catchers. Among the latter was Carlton Fisk who credited Mace with teaching him technical and leadership skills that stayed with him throughout his career.

Brown died in Greensboro, North Carolina, at the age of 92.

== See also ==
- List of Major League Baseball annual saves leaders

Sporting positions
Preceded by Bob Turley	Boston Red Sox pitching coach 1965	Succeeded by Sal Maglie
