= Bill Swift (1930s pitcher) =

American baseball player (1908–1969)

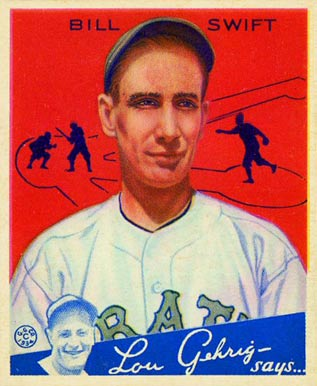
- Pitcher
- Born: June 19, 1908; Glen Lyon, Pennsylvania, U.S.
- Died: February 23, 1969 (aged 60); Bartow, Florida, U.S.
- Batted: Right Threw: Right

MLB debut
- April 12, 1932, for the Pittsburgh Pirates

Last MLB appearance
- September 29, 1943, for the Chicago White Sox

MLB statistics
- Win–loss record: 95–82
- Earned run average: 3.58
- Strikeouts: 636
- Stats at Baseball Reference

Teams
- Pittsburgh Pirates (1932–1939); Boston Bees (1940); Brooklyn Dodgers (1941); Chicago White Sox (1943)

William Vincent Swift (June 19, 1908 – February 23, 1969) was an American professional baseball player. He was a pitcher for the Pittsburgh Pirates (1932–39), Boston Bees (1940), Brooklyn Dodgers (1941), and Chicago White Sox (1943) in Major League Baseball (MLB). He helped the Dodgers win the 1941 National League Pennant.

Swift led the National League in walks/9IP (1.09) in 1932 and hit batsmen (8) in 1934. He ranks 71st on the MLB career walks/9IP list (1.93). In 11 seasons he had a 95–82 win–loss record, 336 games (163 started), 78 complete games, 7 shutouts, 119 games finished, 20 saves, 1,637 2/3 innings pitched, 1,682 hits allowed, 753 runs allowed, 651 earned runs allowed, 103 home runs allowed, 351 walks, 636 strikeouts, 36 hit batsmen, 11 wild pitches, 6,891 batters faced, 1 balk, a 3.58 ERA and a 1.241 WHIP.

Swift was an above average hitting pitcher in his career. He posted a .227 batting average (134-for-591) with 34 runs, 3 home runs and 54 RBI.

Born in Glen Lyon, Pennsylvania, Swift died in Bartow, Florida, at the age of 60.

Swift's numbers were extremely similar to fellow pitcher Bill Swift, who pitched decades later.
