= Bill Atwood =

American baseball player (1911-1993)

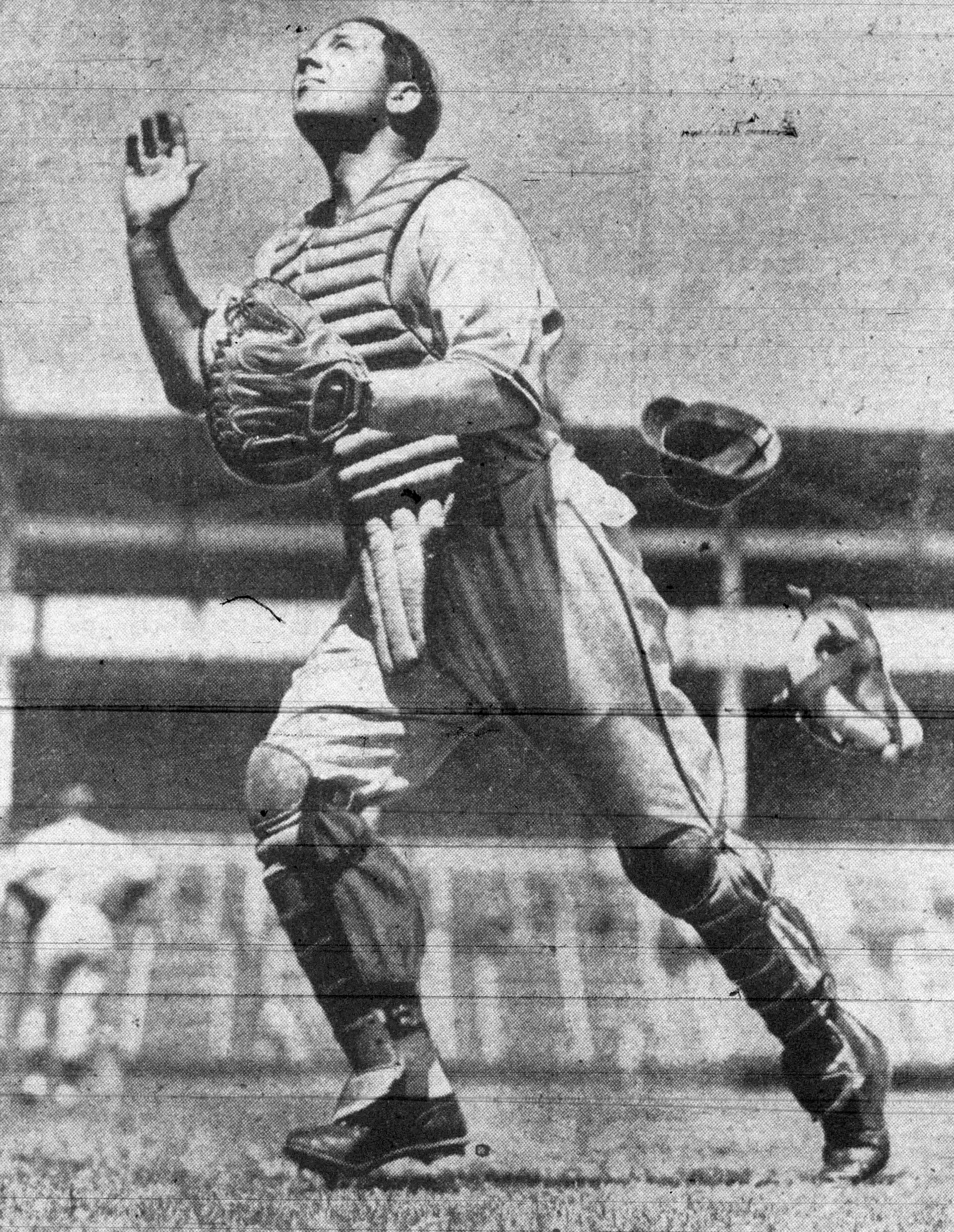
- Atwood, circa 1942
- Catcher
- Born: September 25, 1911; Rome, Georgia, U.S.
- Died: September 14, 1993 (aged 81); Snyder, Texas, U.S.
- Batted: Right Threw: Right

MLB debut
- April 15, 1936, for the Philadelphia Phillies

Last MLB appearance
- September 29, 1940, for the Philadelphia Phillies

MLB statistics
- Batting average: .229
- Home runs: 7
- Runs batted in: 112
- Stats at Baseball Reference

Teams
- Philadelphia Phillies (1936–1940)

William Franklin Atwood (September 25, 1911 - September 14, 1993) was an American professional baseball player. He played in Major League Baseball (MLB) as a catcher for the Philadelphia Phillies from 1936 to 1940.

Atwood was born in Rome, Georgia on September 25, 1911. He attended college at Hardin-Simmons University. In 342 career games between 1936 and 1940, Atwood had 220 hits in 961 at bats. He died on September 14, 1993, after a car accident in Snyder, Texas.
