= 1936 Major League Baseball All-Star Game =

1936 American baseball competition

	1	2	3	4	5	6	7	8	9	R	H	E
American League	0	0	0	0	0	0	3	0	0	3	7	1
National League	0	2	0	0	2	0	0	0	X	4	9	0
- Date: July 7, 1936
- Venue: National League Park
- City: Boston, Massachusetts
- Managers: Joe McCarthy (NYY); Charlie Grimm (CHC)
- Attendance: 25,556
- Ceremonial first pitch: None
- Radio: CBS; NBC; Mutual
- Radio announcers: Arch McDonald and Dolly Stark (CBS); Hal Totten, Tom Manning and Graham McNamee (NBC); Fred Hoey and Linus Travers (Mutual)

The 1936 Major League Baseball All-Star Game was the fourth playing of the mid-summer classic between the all-stars of the American League (AL) and National League (NL), the two leagues comprising Major League Baseball. The game was held on July 7, 1936, at National League Park in Boston, Massachusetts, the home of the Boston Bees of the National League. The game resulted in the National League defeating the American League 4–3. It was the National League's first win in All-Star Game history. Joe DiMaggio became the first rookie player in MLB history to start in an All-Star Game.

== Rosters ==
Players in italics have since been inducted into the National Baseball Hall of Fame.

=== American League ===
Starters
Position	Player	Team	All-Star Games
P	Lefty Grove	Red Sox	3
C	Rick Ferrell	Red Sox	4
1B	Lou Gehrig	Yankees	4
2B	Charlie Gehringer	Tigers	4
3B	Pinky Higgins	Athletics	2
SS	Luke Appling	White Sox	1
LF	Rip Radcliff	White Sox	1
CF	Earl Averill	Indians	4
RF	Joe DiMaggio	Yankees	1

Pitchers
Position	Player	Team	All-Star Games
P	Tommy Bridges	Tigers	3
P	Lefty Gomez	Yankees	4
P	Mel Harder	Indians	3
P	Vern Kennedy	White Sox	1
P	Monte Pearson	Yankees	1
P	Schoolboy Rowe	Tigers	2

Reserves
Position	Player	Team	All-Star Games
C	Rollie Hemsley	Browns	2
C	Bill Dickey	Yankees	3
1B	Jimmie Foxx	Red Sox	4
SS	Frankie Crosetti	Yankees	1
SS	Joe Cronin	Red Sox	4
OF	Ben Chapman	Senators	4
OF	Goose Goslin	Tigers	1
OF	George Selkirk	Yankees	1

=== National League ===
Starters
Position	Player	Team	All-Star Games
P	Dizzy Dean	Cardinals	3
C	Gabby Hartnett	Cubs	4
1B	Ripper Collins	Cardinals	2
2B	Billy Herman	Cubs	3
3B	Pinky Whitney	Phillies	1
SS	Leo Durocher	Cardinals	1
LF	Joe Medwick	Cardinals	3
CF	Augie Galan	Cubs	1
RF	Frank Demaree	Cubs	1

Pitchers
Position	Player	Team	All-Star Games
P	Curt Davis	Cubs	1
P	Carl Hubbell	Giants	4
P	Van Mungo	Dodgers	2
P	Lon Warneke	Cubs	3

Reserves
Position	Player	Team	All-Star Games
C	Ernie Lombardi	Reds	1
1B	Gus Suhr	Pirates	1
2B	Stu Martin	Cardinals	1
3B	Lew Riggs	Reds	1
SS	Arky Vaughan	Pirates	3
OF	Wally Berger	Bees	4
OF	Jo-Jo Moore	Giants	3
OF	Mel Ott	Giants	3

== Game ==
=== Umpires ===
Position	Umpire	League
Home Plate	Beans Reardon	National
First Base	Bill Summers	American
Second Base	Bill Stewart	National
Third Base	Lou Kolls	American

The umpires rotated positions clockwise in the middle of the fifth inning, with Summers moving behind the plate.

=== Starting lineups ===
American League				National League			
Order	Player	Team	Position	Order	Player	Team	Position
1	Luke Appling	White Sox	SS	1	Augie Galan	Cubs	CF
2	Charlie Gehringer	Tigers	2B	2	Billy Herman	Cubs	2B
3	Joe DiMaggio	Yankees	RF	3	Ripper Collins	Cardinals	1B
4	Lou Gehrig	Yankees	1B	4	Joe Medwick	Cardinals	LF
5	Earl Averill	Indians	CF	5	Frank Demaree	Cubs	RF
6	Rick Ferrell	Red Sox	C	6	Gabby Hartnett	Cubs	C
7	Rip Radcliff	White Sox	LF	7	Pinky Whitney	Phillies	3B
8	Pinky Higgins	Athletics	3B	8	Leo Durocher	Cardinals	SS
9	Lefty Grove	Red Sox	P	9	Dizzy Dean	Cardinals	P

=== Game summary ===
Tuesday, July 7, 1936 1:30 pm (ET) at National League Park in Boston, Massachusetts
Team	1	2	3	4	5	6	7	8	9	R	H	E
American League	0	0	0	0	0	0	3	0	0	3	7	1
National League	0	2	0	0	2	0	0	0	-	4	9	0
WP: Dizzy Dean (1–0) LP: Lefty Grove (0–1) Sv: Lon Warneke (1); Home runs: AL: Lou Gehrig (1); NL: Augie Galan (1)

Joe DiMaggio became the first rookie to play in an All-Star Game; he was hitless in five-at-bats and made an error in right field.
