= Roy Henshaw =

American baseball player (1911–1993)

- Pitcher
- Born: July 29, 1911; Chicago, Illinois, U.S.
- Died: June 8, 1993 (aged 81); LaGrange, Illinois, U.S.
- Batted: Right Threw: Left

MLB debut
- April 15, 1933, for the Chicago Cubs

Last MLB appearance
- September 10, 1944, for the Detroit Tigers

MLB statistics
- Win–loss record: 33–40
- Earned run average: 4.16
- Strikeouts: 337
- Stats at Baseball Reference

Teams
- Chicago Cubs (1933, 1935–1936); Brooklyn Dodgers (1937); St. Louis Cardinals (1938); Detroit Tigers (1942–1944)

Roy Knikelbine Henshaw (July 29, 1911 – June 8, 1993) was an American professional baseball pitcher who played in Major League Baseball from 1933 to 1944.

Born in Chicago, Henshaw played collegiately for the University of Chicago. Henshaw spent eight seasons in the Major Leagues as a member of the Brooklyn Dodgers, Chicago Cubs, St. Louis Cardinals, and Detroit Tigers. He played in the National Baseball Congress with the St. Joseph's Autos team in 1946.

Henshaw died on June 8, 1993, in LaGrange, Illinois.
