= Larry French =

American baseball player and naval officer (1907–1987)

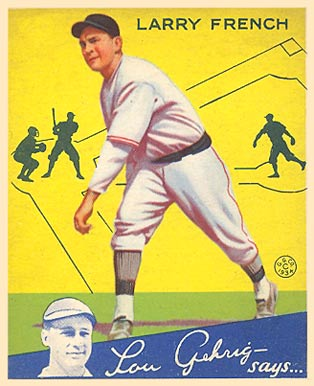
- 1934 baseball card of French
- Pitcher
- Born: November 1, 1907; Visalia, California, U.S.
- Died: February 9, 1987 (aged 79); San Diego, California, U.S.
- Batted: Right Threw: Left

MLB debut
- April 18, 1929, for the Pittsburgh Pirates

Last MLB appearance
- September 26, 1942, for the Brooklyn Dodgers

MLB statistics
- Win–loss record: 197–171
- Earned run average: 3.44
- Strikeouts: 1,187
- Stats at Baseball Reference

Teams
- Pittsburgh Pirates (1929–1934); Chicago Cubs (1935–1941); Brooklyn Dodgers (1941–1942)

Career highlights and awards
- All-Star (1940)

Lawrence Herbert French (November 1, 1907 – February 9, 1987) was an American starting pitcher in Major League Baseball who played for the Pittsburgh Pirates (1929–1934), Chicago Cubs (1935–1941), and Brooklyn Dodgers (1941–1942). A knuckleball specialist, French threw left-handed and batted right-handed.

== Baseball career ==
French was born in Visalia, California, in 1907. From 1926 to 1928, he played for the Portland Beavers of the Pacific Coast League. He then joined the National League's Pittsburgh Pirates and was a workhorse for them, pitching over 260 innings every year from 1930 to 1934.

The Pirates then traded French to the Chicago Cubs. He played for the Cubs from 1935 to 1941. He led the NL in shutouts in 1935, with four, and in 1936, with four again. French won at least 10 games every season from 1930 to 1940.

After a poor start in 1941, French joined the Brooklyn Dodgers and played for them through the 1942 season before leaving professional baseball.

In a 14-year major league career, French had a 197–171 record with a 3.44 earned run average and 1,187 strikeouts in 3,152 innings pitched, including 40 shutouts and 198 complete games. He had at least 10 starts and 6 games in relief in all 14 seasons of his career. As a hitter, French posted a .188 batting average (199-for-1057) with 1 home run, 83 runs scored, 84 runs batted in, and 48 bases on balls in 570 games. Defensively, he recorded a .951 fielding percentage. French played in the 1935, 1938, and 1941 World Series, which were all losing efforts.

One author described French as the best pitcher not in the Baseball Hall of Fame.

=== Shower game ===
With his team leading the Boston Braves 8–0 in the ninth inning during their game on July 12, 1933, reliever French figured he could duck out of the bullpen and hit the showers early. Little did he know as he was getting clean that the Braves had rallied to make the score 8–7. When the call came for French to pitch, he did not even have time to rinse off. He put on his uniform and hustled out to the mound with soap trickling down his neck.

== Later life ==
French joined the United States Navy after the 1942 baseball season and became a career sailor, serving in both World War II and the Korean War. He retired in 1969 with the rank of Captain, having been awarded the Legion of Merit.

French died in San Diego, California, in 1987 at age 79.
