= Red Lucas =

American baseball player (1902–1986)

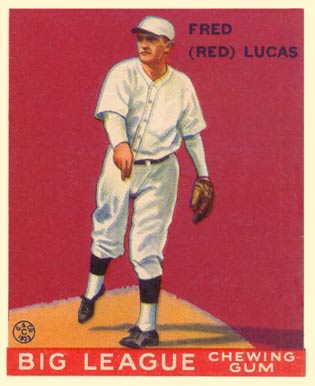
- Pitcher / Pinch hitter
- Born: April 28, 1902; Columbia, Tennessee, U.S.
- Died: July 9, 1986 (aged 84); Nashville, Tennessee, U.S.
- Batted: Left Threw: Right

MLB debut
- April 19, 1923, for the New York Giants

Last MLB appearance
- October 1, 1938, for the Pittsburgh Pirates

MLB statistics
- Win–loss record: 157–135
- Earned run average: 3.72
- Strikeouts: 602
- Batting average: .281
- Home runs: 3
- Runs batted in: 190
- Stats at Baseball Reference

Teams
- New York Giants (1923); Boston Braves (1924); Cincinnati Reds (1926–1933); Pittsburgh Pirates (1934–1938)

Career highlights and awards
- Cincinnati Reds Hall of Fame

Charles Fred "Red" Lucas (April 28, 1902 – July 9, 1986) was an American professional baseball pitcher and pinch hitter. He played in Major League Baseball (MLB) from 1923 to 1938 for the New York Giants, Boston Braves, Cincinnati Reds, and Pittsburgh Pirates.

== Biography ==
He was a pitcher who contributed to his teams in several positions over the years. Red Lucas was one of the most recent two-way players, serving as a prolific pinch hitter throughout his career. He helped the Giants win the 1923 National League Pennant. Lucas finished 11th in voting for the 1927 National League MVP. That year, he had a won–loss record of 18–11, with 19 complete games, 4 shutouts, 2 saves, 239 2/3 innings pitched, and a 3.38 ERA.

Lucas was 6th in voting for the 1929 NL MVP for leading the league in WHIP (1.204), hits allowed per 9 innings pitched (8.90), and 28 completed games. He had a 19–12 win–loss record, with 2 shutouts and a 3.60 ERA. Lucas finished 14th in voting for the 1931 NL MVP. While Lucas led the National League in shutouts with 4 in 1928, completing 28 games in 1932 and walks/9IP (1.33) in 1936. He appeared in 19 games as a fielder, mostly at second base, but occasionally at third base, shortstop, or the outfield.

Lucas pinch hit 505 times over his 16 seasons; his 114 base hits as a pinch hitter rank him among the most prolific pinch hitters in Major League Baseball history. His total was, by far, the most ever for a player whose primary position was pitcher.

As a pitcher, Lucas batted seventh in the lineup for the Reds on September 7, 1933, and was the last Reds pitcher to bat higher than ninth until Jason Marquis batted eighth in May 2015.

Lucas posted a .281 batting average with 155 runs, 3 home runs, 190 RBI and 124 bases on balls in his major league career. Defensively, he was better than average, recording a .981 fielding percentage as a pitcher and a .977 fielding percentage overall.

After his major league career, Lucas spent several seasons managing and occasional pitching in the minor leagues. He served as a minor league manager in 1941 with Grand Rapids (Michigan State League) and in 1942 Newport (Tenn.) of the Appalachian League. Lucas was a player/coach for the Nashville Vols in 1944 and 1945. He managed the Class D Lumberton Cubs of the Tobacco State League in 1947. In 1948, Lucas was the manager of the Decatur Ill. club in the Illinois-Indiana-Iowa League.

His nickname, "The Nashville Narcissus," was coined by Colonel Bob Newhall, a reporter for the old Cincinnati Tribune, who may have thought the young pitcher was a blooming star. He died in Nashville, Tennessee on July 9, 1986.
