= Claude Passeau =

American baseball player (1909–2003)

- Claude Passeau in 1936 with the Phillies.
- Pitcher
- Born: April 9, 1909; Waynesboro, Mississippi, U.S.
- Died: August 30, 2003 (aged 94); Lucedale, Mississippi, U.S.
- Batted: Right Threw: Right

MLB debut
- September 29, 1935, for the Pittsburgh Pirates

Last MLB appearance
- September 17, 1947, for the Chicago Cubs

MLB statistics
- Win–loss record: 162–150
- Earned run average: 3.32
- Strikeouts: 1,104
- Stats at Baseball Reference

Teams
- Pittsburgh Pirates (1935); Philadelphia Phillies (1936–1939); Chicago Cubs (1939–1947)

Career highlights and awards
- 5× All-Star (1941–1943, 1945, 1946); NL strikeout leader (1939)

Claude William Passeau (April 9, 1909 – August 30, 2003) was an American starting pitcher in Major League Baseball. From 1935 through 1947, Passeau played with the Pittsburgh Pirates (1935), Philadelphia Phillies (1936–39) and Chicago Cubs (1939–47). He batted and threw right-handed. In a 13-year career, Passeau posted a 162–150 record with 1,104 strikeouts and a 3.32 ERA in 2,179 2/3 innings.

== Personal life ==
Passeau was a native of Waynesboro, Mississippi. He was a graduate of Millsaps College in Jackson, Mississippi, where he joined Kappa Sigma. Passeau was considered the finest college quarterback in Mississippi, but he chose to pursue an athletic career in professional baseball rather than football after graduation.

== Baseball career ==
1939 photo of Passeau posing for Chicago Cubs

Passeau started his career with the Pittsburgh Pirates, then played for several years with the Philadelphia Phillies at their notorious "bandbox" ballpark, the Baker Bowl, before being traded to the Chicago Cubs, where he had several winning seasons.

Passeau surrendered the game-winning home run to Ted Williams in the 1941 All-Star Game.

Passeau's greatest individual performance came in Game 3 of the 1945 World Series, in which he pitched a one-hitter against the Detroit Tigers. Slugger Rudy York got the Tigers' only hit, in the second inning, and the Cubs took a 2-games-to-1 edge. Due to wartime travel restrictions that were still in place, despite the war having ended, the first three games were in Detroit and the last four in Chicago. Back in Wrigley Field, the Cubs lost three of four games, their last appearance in the Series until 2016. Passeau was the starting pitcher for the Cubs in Game 6, but had to be removed from the game during the sixth inning after he injured his pitching hand while fielding a hard smash. Passeau had a comfortable lead in the game, but the Chicago bullpen could not check the Tigers. The game went into extra innings and the Cubs emptied their bench. Hank Borowy, who was scheduled to pitch Game 7, was pressed into service and pitched four innings as Chicago won the game in twelve innings. Passeau's injury proved to be costly as the Cubs were without a well rested pitcher to face Hal Newhouser in the final game.

That one-hit game was only the second low-hit game in the history of the Series; the first was pitched by the Cubs' Ed Reulbach in 1906. There have only been four low-hit Series games since, including Don Larsen's perfect game in the 1956 World Series, and Roy Halladay's one walk no hitter in the 2010 NLDS, which are two of only three no-hitters in MLB postseason history.

Passeau was a better than average hitting pitcher, as he had a career average of .192 (189–982), hitting 15 home runs and recording 80 RBI in a 13-year career. On May 19, 1941, he hit a grand slam home run and had 5 RBI in a 14–1 victory over the Dodgers. In the 1937, 1941 and 1942 seasons, he compiled 11, 12 and 10 RBI respectively.

== Death ==
Passeau died on August 30, 2003, in Lucedale, Mississippi, aged 94.

== See also ==
- List of Major League Baseball annual strikeout leaders
- List of Major League Baseball all-time leaders in home runs by pitchers
