= Jim Weaver (right-handed pitcher) =

American baseball player (1903–1983)

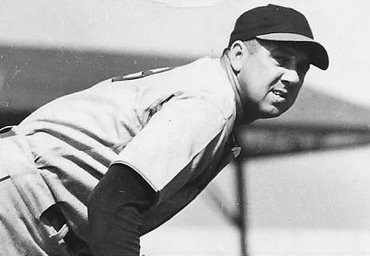
- Weaver, circa 1939
- Pitcher
- Born: November 25, 1903; Obion County, Tennessee, U.S.
- Died: December 12, 1983 (aged 80); Lakeland, Florida, U.S.
- Batted: Right Threw: Right

MLB debut
- August 27, 1928, for the Washington Senators

Last MLB appearance
- May 8, 1939, for the Cincinnati Reds

MLB statistics
- Win–loss record: 57–36
- Earned run average: 3.88
- Strikeouts: 449
- Stats at Baseball Reference

Teams
- Washington Senators (1928); New York Yankees (1931); St. Louis Browns (1934); Chicago Cubs (1934); Pittsburgh Pirates (1935–1937); St. Louis Browns (1938); Cincinnati Reds (1938–1939)

James Dement "Big James" Weaver (November 25, 1903 – December 12, 1983) was an American Major League Baseball pitcher with the Washington Senators, New York Yankees, St. Louis Browns, Chicago Cubs, Pittsburgh Pirates and the Cincinnati Reds between 1928 and 1939. He batted and threw right-handed.

Over the course of his 12-year MLB career, Weaver compiled a 57–36 win–loss record, a 3.88 ERA, striking out 449 while walking 336. His only ejection came on June 21, 1936, for singing in the dugout, annoying umpire Beans Reardon, with whom he had an argument the game before.

Weaver was born in Obion County, Tennessee, and died in Lakeland, Florida.
