= 1937 Philadelphia Phillies season =

1937 Philadelphia Phillies
- League: National League
- Ballpark: Baker Bowl
- City: Philadelphia
- Owners: Gerald Nugent
- Managers: Jimmie Wilson
- Radio: WCAU (Bill Dyer, Roger Griswold)

The 1937 Philadelphia Phillies season was a season in Major League Baseball. The Phillies finished seventh in the National League with a record of 61 wins and 92 losses.

== Offseason ==
- January 6, 1937: Chuck Sheerin was released by the Phillies.

== Regular season ==
=== Season standings ===
National League
Team	W	L	Pct.	GB	Home	Road
New York Giants	95	57	.625	—	50‍–‍25	45‍–‍32
Chicago Cubs	93	61	.604	3	46‍–‍32	47‍–‍29
Pittsburgh Pirates	86	68	.558	10	46‍–‍32	40‍–‍36
St. Louis Cardinals	81	73	.526	15	45‍–‍33	36‍–‍40
Boston Bees	79	73	.520	16	43‍–‍33	36‍–‍40
Brooklyn Dodgers	62	91	.405	33½	36‍–‍39	26‍–‍52
Philadelphia Phillies	61	92	.399	34½	29‍–‍45	32‍–‍47
Cincinnati Reds	56	98	.364	40	28‍–‍51	28‍–‍47

=== Record vs. opponents ===
1937 National League record Sources:
Team	BSN	BRO	CHC	CIN	NYG	PHI	PIT	STL
Boston	—	15–7	9–13	11–11	10–10	14–8	11–11	9–13
Brooklyn	7–15	—	8–14	12–10–1	6–16	10–11	12–10	7–15–1
Chicago	13–9	14–8	—	14–8	12–10	14–8	9–13	17–5
Cincinnati	11–11	10–12–1	8–14	—	8–14	11–11	1–21	7–15
New York	10–10	16–6	10–12	14–8	—	15–7	16–6	14–8
Philadelphia	8–14	11–10	8–14	11–11	7–15	—	11–11	5–17–2
Pittsburgh	11–11	10–12	13–9	21–1	6–16	11–11	—	14–8
St. Louis	13–9	15–7–1	5–17	15–7	8–14	17–5–2	8–14	—

=== Game log ===
Legend
	Phillies win
	Phillies loss (via forfeit)
	Phillies loss
	Phillies tie
	Postponement
**Bold**	Phillies team member

1937 Game Log
Overall Record: 61–92–2
April (4–4)

#	Date	Opponent	Score	Win	Loss	Save	Attendance	Record
1	April 19 (1)	@ Bees	2–1 (11)	**Wayne LaMaster** (1–0)	Guy Bush (0–1)	None	see 2nd game	1–0
2	April 19 (2)	@ Bees	1–0	**Bucky Walters** (1–0)	Danny MacFayden (0–1)	None	24,936	2–0
–	April 21	@ Bees	Postponed (rain and cold weather); Makeup: July 11 as a traditional double-header					
–	April 22	@ Bees	Postponed (rain and wet grounds); Makeup: September 8 as a traditional double-header					
3	April 23	Dodgers	3–4	Fred Frankhouse (1–0)	**Bucky Walters** (1–1)	None	4,000	2–1
4	April 24	Dodgers	7–3	**Wayne LaMaster** (2–0)	Van Mungo (0–2)	None	6,000	3–1
5	April 25	Dodgers	6–10 (11)	Harry Eisenstat (1–0)	**Syl Johnson** (0–1)	None	7,000	3–2
–	April 26	Giants	Postponed (rain); Makeup: May 29 as a traditional double-header					
–	April 27	Giants	Postponed (rain); Makeup: August 22 as a traditional double-header					
6	April 28	Bees	7–4	**Claude Passeau** (1–0)	Danny MacFayden (0–3)	None	2,000	4–2
7	April 29	Bees	4–6 (11)	Guy Bush (2–1)	**Wayne LaMaster** (2–1)	None	4,000	4–3
8	April 30	Bees	2–10	Jim Turner (1–0)	**Orville Jorgens** (0–1)	None	4,500	4–4

May (12–17)

#	Date	Opponent	Score	Win	Loss	Save	Attendance	Record
9	May 1	@ Dodgers	4–2	**Wayne LaMaster** (3–1)	Fred Frankhouse (1–1)	None	9,602	5–4
10	May 2	@ Dodgers	1–5	Van Mungo (2–2)	**Claude Passeau** (1–1)	None	15,955	5–5
11	May 3	@ Dodgers	14–8	**Orville Jorgens** (1–1)	Ralph Birkofer (0–2)	**Wayne LaMaster** (1)	5,105	6–5
12	May 4	Cubs	7–14	Roy Parmelee (2–0)	**Hugh Mulcahy** (0–1)	None	3,000	6–6
13	May 5	Cubs	4–17	Charlie Root (1–1)	**Syl Johnson** (0–2)	None	4,000	6–7
14	May 6	Cubs	0–1 (5)	Bill Lee (2–3)	**Claude Passeau** (1–2)	None	not available	6–8
15	May 7	Pirates	3–8	Joe Bowman (3–0)	**Wayne LaMaster** (3–2)	None	4,000	6–9
–	May 8	Pirates	Postponed (rain); Makeup: July 18 as a traditional double-header					
16	May 9	Reds	10–21	Peaches Davis (1–2)	**Hugh Mulcahy** (0–2)	None	7,000	6–10
17	May 10	Reds	10–3	**Bucky Walters** (2–1)	Lee Grissom (1–3)	None	500	7–10
18	May 11	Reds	3–12	Al Hollingsworth (1–0)	**Wayne LaMaster** (3–3)	None	1,000	7–11
19	May 12	Cardinals	3–15	Bill McGee (1–0)	**Claude Passeau** (1–3)	None	2,500	7–12
20	May 13	Cardinals	4–5	Lon Warneke (4–1)	**Hugh Mulcahy** (0–3)	Si Johnson (1)	1,500	7–13
–	May 14	@ Giants	Postponed (rain); Makeup: May 15 as a traditional double-header					
21	May 15 (1)	@ Giants	6–2	**Syl Johnson** (1–2)	Freddie Fitzsimmons (1–2)	None	see 2nd game	8–13
22	May 15 (2)	@ Giants	1–2	Hal Schumacher (2–4)	**Wayne LaMaster** (3–4)	None	22,633	8–14
23	May 16	@ Giants	6–0	**Claude Passeau** (2–3)	Cliff Melton (1–3)	None	18,950	9–14
24	May 18	@ Pirates	1–2	Cy Blanton (4–1)	**Hugh Mulcahy** (0–4)	None	2,500	9–15
25	May 19	@ Pirates	5–4	**Bucky Walters** (3–1)	Ed Brandt (3–1)	None	2,000	10–15
26	May 20	@ Pirates	2–5	Bill Swift (3–1)	**Wayne LaMaster** (3–5)	None	2,800	10–16
27	May 21	@ Reds	5–6	Don Brennan (1–0)	**Claude Passeau** (2–4)	Lee Grissom (1)	1,586	10–17
28	May 22	@ Reds	19–9	**Claude Passeau** (3–4)	Al Hollingsworth (1–1)	None	3,025	11–17
29	May 23	@ Cardinals	2–6	Dizzy Dean (6–2)	**Bucky Walters** (3–2)	None	13,529	11–18
30	May 25	@ Cubs	3–5	Bill Lee (4–4)	**Claude Passeau** (3–5)	None	3,093	11–19
31	May 26	@ Cubs	6–1	**Wayne LaMaster** (4–5)	Roy Parmelee (3–4)	None	3,848	12–19
32	May 27	@ Cubs	11–2	**Bucky Walters** (4–2)	Larry French (0–4)	None	2,045	13–19
33	May 29 (1)	Giants	4–10	Cliff Melton (2–3)	**Claude Passeau** (3–6)	None	see 2nd game	13–20
34	May 29 (2)	Giants	2–4	Dick Coffman (1–0)	**Hugh Mulcahy** (0–5)	None	12,000	13–21
35	May 30	Giants	6–3	**Wayne LaMaster** (5–5)	Harry Gumbert (1–1)	**Orville Jorgens** (1)	8,000	14–21
36	May 31 (1)	Bees	6–3	**Bucky Walters** (5–2)	Danny MacFayden (3–6)	None	see 2nd game	15–21
37	May 31 (2)	Bees	9–6	**Claude Passeau** (4–6)	Jim Turner (3–2)	None	15,000	16–21

June (8–17)

#	Date	Opponent	Score	Win	Loss	Save	Attendance	Record
38	June 2	Reds	4–8	Johnny Vander Meer (1–2)	**Leon Pettit** (0–1)	Lee Grissom (3)	1,000	16–22
–	June 3	Reds	Postponed (rain); Makeup: July 25 as a traditional double-header					
39	June 4	Reds	8–9	Al Hollingsworth (2–2)	**Wayne LaMaster** (5–6)	Peaches Davis (1)	6,000	16–23
40	June 5	Cardinals	1–3	Dizzy Dean (7–4)	**Claude Passeau** (4–7)	None	8,000	16–24
41	June 6 (1)^{^{[a]}}	Cardinals	2–7	Lon Warneke (6–2)	**Bucky Walters** (5–3)	None	see 2nd game	16–25
42	June 6 (2)^{^{[a]}}	Cardinals	0–0^{^{[b]}} (0)	None	None	None	12,000	16–26
43	June 8	Pirates	1–8	Russ Bauers (1–1)	**Wayne LaMaster** (5–7)	None	2,000	16–27
44	June 9	Pirates	8–1	**Claude Passeau** (5–7)	Jim Tobin (1–1)	None	1,500	17–27
45	June 10	Pirates	5–4	**Bucky Walters** (6–3)	Bill Swift (4–4)	None	6,000	18–27
46	June 12	Cubs	5–10	Larry French (3–4)	**Wayne LaMaster** (5–8)	None	5,000	18–28
47	June 13 (1)^{^{[c]}}	Cubs	8–16	Clyde Shoun (5–1)	**Claude Passeau** (5–8)	None	see 2nd game	18–29
48	June 13 (2)^{^{[c]}}	Cubs	4–3	**Wayne LaMaster** (6–8)	Roy Parmelee (5–5)	None	10,000	19–29
49	June 15	@ Cardinals	4–13	Mike Ryba (2–1)	**Bucky Walters** (6–4)	None	2,645	19–30
50	June 16	@ Cardinals	6–7	Jesse Haines (1–0)	**Wayne LaMaster** (6–9)	None	1,801	19–31
51	June 17	@ Cardinals	13–7	**Hugh Mulcahy** (1–5)	Dizzy Dean (9–5)	None	4,141	20–31
52	June 18	@ Cubs	7–8	Clyde Shoun (6–1)	**Hugh Mulcahy** (1–6)	None	8,304	20–32
53	June 19	@ Cubs	1–2	Larry French (4–4)	**Wayne LaMaster** (6–10)	None	11,021	20–33
54	June 20	@ Cubs	6–5	**Bucky Walters** (7–4)	Clay Bryant (5–1)	**Syl Johnson** (1)	23,734	21–33
55	June 22	@ Reds	0–6	Lee Grissom (6–6)	**Claude Passeau** (5–9)	None	2,139	21–34
56	June 23	@ Reds	3–0	**Hugh Mulcahy** (2–6)	Johnny Vander Meer (3–3)	None	4,473	22–34
57	June 24	@ Reds	4–6	Paul Derringer (3–5)	**Syl Johnson** (1–3)	Lee Grissom (5)	1,151	22–35
58	June 25	@ Pirates	10–5	**Wayne LaMaster** (7–10)	Joe Bowman (6–4)	**Orville Jorgens** (2)	5,183	23–35
59	June 26	@ Pirates	7–6 (13)	**Bucky Walters** (8–4)	Cy Blanton (8–4)	None	3,054	24–35
60	June 27	@ Pirates	3–4	Red Lucas (5–2)	**Claude Passeau** (5–10)	None	3,541	24–36
61	June 29	@ Giants	3–4 (10)	Al Smith (2–1)	**Claude Passeau** (5–11)	None	4,717	24–37
62	June 30	@ Giants	2–7	Slick Castleman (8–4)	**Wayne LaMaster** (7–11)	None	6,000	24–38

July (13–18)

#	Date	Opponent	Score	Win	Loss	Save	Attendance	Record
63	July 1	@ Giants	6–8	Al Smith (3–1)	**Bucky Walters** (8–5)	None	4,808	24–39
64	July 2	Dodgers	0–3	Luke Hamlin (5–5)	**Hugh Mulcahy** (2–7)	None	3,000	24–40
65	July 3	Dodgers	7–2	**Claude Passeau** (6–11)	Max Butcher (3–4)	None	2,000	25–40
66	July 4 (1)^{^{[d]}}	Bees	9–14	Ira Hutchinson (2–4)	**Wayne LaMaster** (7–12)	Johnny Lanning (1)	see 2nd game	25–41
67	July 4 (2)^{^{[d]}}	Bees	2–4 (10)	Guy Bush (5–9)	**Orville Jorgens** (1–2)	None	10,000	25–42
68	July 5 (1)	@ Dodgers	3–1	**Syl Johnson** (2–3)	Waite Hoyt (1–5)	None	use 2nd game	26–42
69	July 5 (2)	@ Dodgers	1–7	Fred Frankhouse (5–3)	**Hal Kelleher** (0–1)	None	13,319	26–43
–	July 7	**1937 Major League Baseball All-Star Game at Griffith Stadium in Washington, DC**						
70	July 9	@ Bees	0–5	Jim Turner (8–5)	**Claude Passeau** (6–12)	None	1,617	26–44
71	July 10	@ Bees	4–0	**Bucky Walters** (9–5)	Guy Bush (5–10)	None	2,305	27–44
72	July 11 (1)	@ Bees	10–4	**Hugh Mulcahy** (3–7)	Danny MacFayden (4–12)	**Wayne LaMaster** (2)	8,500	28–44
73	July 11 (2)	@ Bees	0–1 (13)	Lou Fette (10–3)	**Syl Johnson** (2–4)	None	7,158	28–45
74	July 12	Giants	6–3	**Wayne LaMaster** (8–12)	Hal Schumacher (7–8)	**Orville Jorgens** (3)	2,500	29–45
75	July 13	Giants	10–11 (10)	Cliff Melton (9–4)	**Hugh Mulcahy** (3–8)	None	2,500	29–46
–	July 14	Cardinals	Postponed (rain); Makeup: July 15 as a traditional double-header					
–	July 15 (1)	Cardinals	Postponed (rain); Makeup: July 16 as a traditional double-header					
–	July 15 (2)	Cardinals	Postponed (rain); Makeup: August 26 as a traditional double-header					
76	July 16 (1)	Cardinals	3–10	Si Johnson (3–3)	**Bucky Walters** (9–6)	None	see 2nd game	29–47
77	July 16 (2)	Cardinals	10–18 (10)	Si Johnson (4–3)	**Bucky Walters** (9–7)	None	8,428	29–48
78	July 17	Pirates	9–8	**Hugh Mulcahy** (4–8)	Mace Brown (3–1)	None	3,000	30–48
79	July 18 (1)	Pirates	5–2	**Claude Passeau** (7–12)	Red Lucas (5–4)	None	see 2nd game	31–48
80	July 18 (2)	Pirates	5–6 (11)	Bill Swift (7–6)	**Hugh Mulcahy** (4–9)	None	8,000	31–49
81	July 19	Pirates	5–6	Jim Weaver (2–1)	**Bucky Walters** (9–8)	Ed Brandt (1)	1,500	31–50
–	July 20	Cubs	Postponed (rain); Makeup: July 21 as a traditional double-header					
82	July 21 (1)	Cubs	1–4	Bill Lee (10–8)	**Syl Johnson** (2–5)	None	see 2nd game	31–51
83	July 21 (2)	Cubs	0–6	Larry French (6–5)	**Orville Jorgens** (1–3)	None	10,000	31–52
84	July 22	Cubs	7–4	**Wayne LaMaster** (9–12)	Clyde Shoun (6–3)	**Hugh Mulcahy** (1)	1,500	32–52
85	July 23	Reds	3–6	Bill Hallahan (3–5)	**Bucky Walters** (9–9)	Al Hollingsworth (3)	5,000	32–53
86	July 24	Reds	13–11	**Hal Kelleher** (1–1)	Paul Derringer (4–8)	**Wayne LaMaster** (3)	3,500	33–53
87	July 25 (1)	Reds	3–13	Al Hollingsworth (7–5)	**Syl Johnson** (2–6)	None	see 2nd game	33–54
88	July 25 (2)	Reds	7–3	**Wayne LaMaster** (10–12)	Peaches Davis (5–8)	None	7,000	34–54
89	July 27	@ Pirates	1–4	Red Lucas (7–4)	**Bucky Walters** (9–10)	None	3,807	34–55
90	July 28	@ Pirates	4–6	Jim Weaver (3–1)	**Claude Passeau** (7–13)	Mace Brown (2)	1,685	34–56
91	July 29	@ Pirates	11–7	**Orville Jorgens** (2–3)	Bill Swift (7–8)	**Syl Johnson** (2)	4,307	35–56
92	July 30	@ Reds	1–0	**Wayne LaMaster** (11–12)	Al Hollingsworth (7–6)	None	13,168	36–56
93	July 31	@ Reds	10–8	**Bucky Walters** (10–10)	Bill Hallahan (3–6)	**Hugh Mulcahy** (2)	1,638	37–56

August (14–12–1)

#	Date	Opponent	Score	Win	Loss	Save	Attendance	Record
94	August 1 (1)^{^{[e]}}	@ Reds	1–5	Lee Grissom (11–10)	**Hugh Mulcahy** (4–10)	None	see 2nd game	37–57
95	August 1 (2)^{^{[e]}}	@ Reds	3–2	**Claude Passeau** (8–13)	Paul Derringer (4–10)	None	13,185	38–57
96	August 3	@ Cubs	1–4	Bill Lee (12–9)	**Syl Johnson** (2–7)	None	9,265	38–58
97	August 4	@ Cubs	2–1	**Wayne LaMaster** (12–12)	Larry French (9–6)	None	7,852	39–58
98	August 5	@ Cubs	4–2	**Bucky Walters** (11–10)	Clyde Shoun (6–4)	None	6,531	40–58
99	August 6	@ Cardinals	7–10	Mike Ryba (5–2)	**Syl Johnson** (2–8)	None	1,784	40–59
100	August 7	@ Cardinals	4–11	Si Johnson (7–5)	**Hugh Mulcahy** (4–11)	None	3,124	40–60
101	August 8 (1)^{^{[f]}}	@ Cardinals	2–3	Bob Weiland (8–9)	**Claude Passeau** (8–14)	None	see 2nd game	40–61
102	August 8 (2)^{^{[f]}}	@ Cardinals	6–6 (12)^{^{[g]}}	None	None	None	12,475	40–61–1
103	August 10	Dodgers	3–7	Roy Henshaw (3–8)	**Bucky Walters** (11–11)	None	2,000	40–62–1
–	August 11	Dodgers	Postponed (rain); Makeup: August 12 as a traditional double-header					
104	August 12 (1)	Dodgers	3–2	**Hugh Mulcahy** (5–11)	Luke Hamlin (7–9)	None	see 2nd game	41–62–1
105	August 12 (2)	Dodgers	8–2	**Claude Passeau** (9–14)	Max Butcher (5–10)	None	8,000	42–62–1
106	August 13	@ Giants	0–5	Carl Hubbell (16–6)	**Wayne LaMaster** (12–13)	None	10,000	42–63–1
107	August 14	@ Giants	1–4	Harry Gumbert (5–8)	**Syl Johnson** (2–9)	None	10,504	42–64–1
108	August 15	@ Giants	3–5	Slick Castleman (11–5)	**Bucky Walters** (11–12)	None	15,000	42–65–1
109	August 17	@ Dodgers	11–1	**Claude Passeau** (10–14)	Luke Hamlin (7–11)	None	1,604	43–65–1
–	August 18	@ Dodgers	Postponed (wet grounds and rain); Makeup: August 19 as a traditional double-header					
110	August 19 (1)	@ Dodgers	0–3	Waite Hoyt (4–6)	**Hugh Mulcahy** (5–12)	None	see 2nd game	43–66–1
111	August 19 (2)	@ Dodgers	7–5	**Syl Johnson** (3–9)	Van Mungo (9–10)	**Claude Passeau** (1)	3,760	44–66–1
112	August 20	Giants	6–13	Dick Coffman (4–2)	**Wayne LaMaster** (12–14)	Carl Hubbell (3)	4,000	44–67–1
113	August 21	Giants	11–3	**Bucky Walters** (12–12)	Cliff Melton (13–7)	None	3,000	45–67–1
–	August 22 (1)	Giants	Postponed (rain); Makeup: August 23 as a traditional double-header					
–	August 22 (2)	Giants	Postponed (rain); Makeup: August 23 as a traditional double-header					
–	August 23 (1)	Giants	Postponed (rain); Makeup: September 29 as a traditional double-header					
–	August 23 (2)	Giants	Postponed (rain); Makeup: September 30 as a traditional double-header					
–	August 25	Reds	Postponed (rain); Makeup: September 21 as a traditional double-header in Cincinnati					
114	August 26 (1)	Cardinals	8–5	**Hal Kelleher** (2–1)	Sheriff Blake (2–4)	**Hugh Mulcahy** (3)	5,000	46–67–1
–	August 26 (2)	Cardinals	Postponed (wet grounds and rain); Makeup: August 27 as a traditional double-header					
115	August 27 (1)	Cardinals	4–1	**Claude Passeau** (11–14)	Bob Weiland (11–10)	None	see 2nd game	47–67–1
116	August 27 (2)	Cardinals	6–3	**Bucky Walters** (13–12)	Mike Ryba (6–4)	**Wayne LaMaster** (4)	8,000	48–67–1
117	August 28	Cardinals	9–6	**Orville Jorgens** (3–3)	Lon Warneke (15–8)	**Syl Johnson** (3)	5,000	49–67–1
118	August 29 (1)^{^{[h]}}	Cubs	10–3	**Hugh Mulcahy** (6–12)	Bill Lee (12–10)	None	see 2nd game	50–67–1
119	August 29 (2)^{^{[h]}}	Cubs	1–2	Larry French (11–9)	**Wayne LaMaster** (12–15)	None	15,000	50–68–1
120	August 31	Pirates	3–0	**Bucky Walters** (14–12)	Ed Brandt (7–8)	None	2,500	51–68–1

September (10–22–1)

#	Date	Opponent	Score	Win	Loss	Save	Attendance	Record
121	September 1	Pirates	5–3	**Claude Passeau** (12–14)	Jim Weaver (6–5)	None	3,000	52–68–1
122	September 2	Pirates	8–11	Mace Brown (5–2)	**Wayne LaMaster** (12–16)	Ed Brandt (2)	3,000	52–69–1
123	September 3	Bees	2–7 (10)	Jim Turner (16–8)	**Hugh Mulcahy** (6–13)	None	7,000	52–70–1
124	September 4	Bees	6–8	Ira Hutchinson (4–6)	**Wayne LaMaster** (12–17)	None	4,000	52–71–1
125	September 5 (1)^{^{[i]}}	Dodgers	4–6	Roy Henshaw (4–9)	**Bucky Walters** (14–13)	None	2,000	52–72–1
–	September 5 (2)^{^{[i]}}	Dodgers	Postponed (rain); Makeup: Reverted to original schedule of single games on September 27 and 28					
126	September 6 (1)	@ Giants	2–6	Cliff Melton (15–9)	**Claude Passeau** (12–15)	None	see 2nd game	52–73–1
127	September 6 (2)	@ Giants	3–9	Hal Schumacher (11–11)	**Hugh Mulcahy** (6–14)	None	46,177	52–74–1
128	September 8 (1)	@ Bees	6–3	**Syl Johnson** (4–9)	Jim Turner (16–9)	None	see 2nd game	53–74–1
129	September 8 (2)	@ Bees	0–1	Milt Shoffner (1–0)	**Orville Jorgens** (3–4)	None	3,007	53–75–1
130	September 9	@ Bees	3–5	Frank Gabler (3–7)	**Claude Passeau** (12–16)	None	1,287	53–76–1
131	September 11	@ Dodgers	4–12	Waite Hoyt (7–8)	**Hugh Mulcahy** (6–15)	None	1,702	53–77–1
132	September 12 (1)^{^{[j]}}	@ Dodgers	4–3 (10)	**Wayne LaMaster** (13–17)	Freddie Fitzsimmons (6–7)	None	see 2nd game	54–77–1
133	September 12 (2)^{^{[j]}}	@ Dodgers	5–9	Fred Frankhouse (10–8)	**Syl Johnson** (4–10)	Luke Hamlin (1)	12,940	54–78–1
134	September 14 (1)	@ Cardinals	8–9 (14)	Howie Krist (1–0)	**Hal Kelleher** (2–2)	None	see 2nd game	54–79–1
135	September 14 (2)	@ Cardinals	0–1 (5)	Lon Warneke (18–9)	**Hugh Mulcahy** (6–16)	None	4,218	54–80–1
136	September 15	@ Cardinals	6–6 (13)^{^{[k]}}	None	None	None	1,190	54–80–2
137	September 16 (1)	@ Cardinals	2–6	Bob Weiland (15–11)	**Hugh Mulcahy** (6–17)	None	see 2nd game	54–81–2
138	September 16 (2)	@ Cardinals	1–8	Howie Krist (2–0)	**Hal Kelleher** (2–3)	None	2,391	54–82–2
139	September 17	@ Cubs	2–10	Larry French (14–10)	**Wayne LaMaster** (13–18)	None	4,218	54–83–2
140	September 18	@ Cubs	3–9	Tex Carleton (14–7)	**Claude Passeau** (12–17)	None	6,635	54–84–2
141	September 19 (1)^{^{[l]}}	@ Pirates	8–1	**Hugh Mulcahy** (7–17)	Red Lucas (8–10)	None	see 2nd game	55–84–2
142	September 19 (2)^{^{[l]}}	@ Pirates	1–5	Russ Bauers (11–6)	**Hal Kelleher** (2–4)	None	6,137	55–85–2
143	September 21 (1)	@ Reds	3–6	Ted Kleinhans (1–1)	**Bucky Walters** (14–14)	Jake Mooty (1)	see 2nd game	55–86–2
144	September 21 (2)	@ Reds	10–1	**Wayne LaMaster** (14–18)	Joe Cascarella (1–6)	None	767	56–86–2
145	September 22	@ Reds	3–2	**Claude Passeau** (13–17)	Al Hollingsworth (9–13)	None	749	57–86–2
146	September 23	@ Reds	9–5	**Hugh Mulcahy** (8–17)	Jake Mooty (0–3)	None	583	58–86–2
147	September 25	Bees	1–2	Lou Fette (18–9)	**Bucky Walters** (14–15)	None	3,000	58–87–2
148	September 26	Bees	3–17	Milt Shoffner (3–1)	**Wayne LaMaster** (14–19)	Guy Bush (1)	4,000	58–88–2
149	September 27^{^{[i]}}	Dodgers	11–3	**Claude Passeau** (14–17)	Roy Henshaw (5–12)	None	300	59–88–2
–	September 28^{^{[i]}}	Dodgers	Canceled (rain); No makeup scheduled					
150	September 29 (1)	Giants	3–6	Cliff Melton (20–9)	**Hugh Mulcahy** (8–18)	None	see 2nd game	59–89–2
151	September 29 (2)	Giants	6–5 (8)	**Wayne LaMaster** (15–19)	Harry Gumbert (10–11)	**Claude Passeau** (2)	5,000	60–89–2
152	September 30 (1)	Giants	1–2	Carl Hubbell (22–8)	**Claude Passeau** (14–18)	None	see 2nd game	60–90–2
153	September 30 (2)	Giants	6–2	**Pete Sivess** (1–0)	Al Smith (5–4)	None	5,000	61–90–2

October (0–2)

#	Date	Opponent	Score	Win	Loss	Save	Attendance	Record
154	October 2	@ Bees	1–7	Jim Turner (20–11)	**Bob Allen** (0–1)	None	1,220	61–91–2
155	October 3	@ Bees	0–6	Lou Fette (20–10)	**Pete Sivess** (1–1)	None	2,829	61–92–2

^{^[a]}The original schedule indicated single games on June 6 and 7 with St. Louis which became a double-header on June 6.
^{^[b]}The second game on June 6, 1937, was forfeited in favor of the St. Louis Cardinals. Contemporary newspaper accounts indicate a 9–0 final score as a result of the forfeiture, but Baseball-Reference indicates a 0–0 score (as the game was not yet official) and Phillies loss. The Phillies manager, Jimmy Wilson, was fined $100 (equivalent to $1,709.54 in 2024) for the stalling tactic.
^{^[c]}The original schedule indicated single games on June 11 and 13 with Chicago which became a double-header on June 13.
^{^[d]}The original schedule indicated single games on June 1 and July 4 with Boston which became a double-header on July 4.
^{^[e]}The original schedule indicated single games on August 1 in Cincinnati and August 24 with Cincinnati which became a double-header on August 1 in Cincinnati.
^{^[f]}The original schedule indicated single games on May 24 and August 8 at St. Louis which became a double-header on August 8.
^{^[g]}The second game on August 8, 1937, ended after twelve innings due to darkness with the score tied 6–6, and an additional game was scheduled for September 14.
^{^[h]}The original schedule indicated single games on August 29 and 30 with Chicago which became a double-header on August 29.
^{^[i]}The original schedule indicated single games on September 5, 27, and 28 with Brooklyn. Either the September 27 or the 28 game was changed to a double-header on September 5, but the second game was postponed due to rain. The game schedule reverted to the original plan.
^{^[j]}The original schedule indicated single games on September 10 and 12 at Brooklyn which became a double-header on September 12.
^{^[k]}The September 15, 1937, game ended after thirteen innings due to darkness with the score tied 6–6, and an additional game was scheduled for September 16.
^{^[l]}The original schedule indicated single games on September 19 and 20 at Pittsburgh which became a double-header on September 19.

=== Roster ===
1937 Philadelphia Phillies
**Roster**
**Pitchers**: 41 Bob Allen; -- Elmer Burkart; 45 Bobby Burke; 41 Larry Crawford; 47 Syl Johnson; 44 Orville Jorgens; 43 Hal Kelleher; 45 Wayne LaMaster; -- Walt Masters; 42 Hugh Mulcahy; 48 Claude Passeau; -- Leon Pettit; 41 Pete Sivess; 40 Bucky Walters	**Catchers**: 11 Bill Atwood; 10 Earl Grace; 47 Walter Stephenson; 12 Jimmy Wilson; **Infielders**: 22 Bill Andrus; 27 Dolph Camilli; 32 Gene Corbett; 21 Leo Norris; 20 George Scharein; 25 Pinky Whitney; 23 Del Young	**Outfielders**: 34 Morrie Arnovich; 24 Earl Browne; 37 Howie Gorman; 36 Chuck Klein; 30 Hersh Martin; 33 Johnny Moore; 37 Fred Tauby	**Manager**: 12 Jimmy Wilson; **Coaches**: 50 Hans Lobert

== Player stats ==
=== Batting ===
==== Starters by position ====
Note: Pos = Position; G = Games played; AB = At bats; H = Hits; Avg. = Batting average; HR = Home runs; RBI = Runs batted in

Pos	Player	G	AB	H	Avg.	HR	RBI
C	Bill Atwood	87	279	68	.244	2	32
1B	Dolph Camilli	131	475	161	.339	27	80
2B	Del Young	109	360	70	.194	0	24
SS	George Scharein	146	511	123	.241	0	57
3B	Pinky Whitney	138	487	166	.341	8	79
OF	Chuck Klein	115	406	132	.325	15	57
OF	Hersh Martin	141	579	164	.283	8	49
OF	Morrie Arnovich	117	410	119	.290	10	60

==== Other batters ====
Note: G = Games played; AB = At bats; H = Hits; Avg. = Batting average; HR = Home runs; RBI = Runs batted in

Player	G	AB	H	Avg.	HR	RBI
Leo Norris	116	381	98	.257	9	36
Earl Browne	105	332	97	.292	6	52
Johnny Moore	96	307	98	.319	9	59
Earl Grace	80	223	47	.211	6	29
Jimmie Wilson	39	87	24	.276	1	8
Walter Stephenson	10	23	6	.261	0	2
Fred Tauby	11	20	0	.000	0	3
Howie Gorman	13	19	4	.211	0	1
Gene Corbett	7	12	4	.333	0	1
Bill Andrus	3	2	0	.000	0	0

=== Pitching ===
==== Starting pitchers ====
Note: G = Games pitched; IP = Innings pitched; W = Wins; L = Losses; ERA = Earned run average; SO = Strikeouts

Player	G	IP	W	L	ERA	SO
Claude Passeau	50	292.1	14	18	4.34	135
Bucky Walters	37	246.1	14	15	4.75	87
Wayne LaMaster	50	220.1	15	19	5.31	135

==== Other pitchers ====
Note: G = Games pitched; IP = Innings pitched; W = Wins; L = Losses; ERA = Earned run average; SO = Strikeouts

Player	G	IP	W	L	ERA	SO
Hugh Mulcahy	56	215.2	8	18	5.13	54
Orville Jorgens	52	140.2	3	4	4.41	34
Syl Johnson	32	138.0	4	10	5.02	46
Pete Sivess	6	23.0	1	1	7.04	4
Bob Allen	3	12.0	0	1	6.75	8
Leon Pettit	3	4.0	0	1	11.25	0

==== Relief pitchers ====
Note: G = Games pitched; W = Wins; L = Losses; SV = Saves; ERA = Earned run average; SO = Strikeouts

Player	G	W	L	SV	ERA	SO
Hal Kelleher	27	2	4	0	6.63	20
Elmer Burkart	7	0	0	0	6.19	4
Larry Crawford	6	0	0	0	15.00	2
Bobby Burke	2	0	0	0	inf	0
Walt Masters	1	0	0	0	36.00	0

== Farm system ==
Level	Team	League	Manager
D	Centreville Colts	Eastern Shore League	Patsy O'Rourke
