= 1937 New York Giants (MLB) season =

1937 New York Giants
- National League champions
- League: National League
- Ballpark: Polo Grounds
- City: New York City
- Record: 95–57 (.625)
- League place: 1st
- Owners: Horace Stoneham
- General managers: Bill Terry
- Managers: Bill Terry

The 1937 New York Giants season was the franchise's 55th season. The Giants won the National League pennant. The team went on to lose to the New York Yankees in the World Series, four games to one.

== Offseason ==
- January 6, 1937: Tommy Thevenow was purchased by the Giants from the Cincinnati Reds.
- January 25, 1937: Ed Madjeski was purchased by the Giants from the New York Yankees.

== Regular season ==
=== Season standings ===
National League
Team	W	L	Pct.	GB	Home	Road
New York Giants	95	57	.625	—	50‍–‍25	45‍–‍32
Chicago Cubs	93	61	.604	3	46‍–‍32	47‍–‍29
Pittsburgh Pirates	86	68	.558	10	46‍–‍32	40‍–‍36
St. Louis Cardinals	81	73	.526	15	45‍–‍33	36‍–‍40
Boston Bees	79	73	.520	16	43‍–‍33	36‍–‍40
Brooklyn Dodgers	62	91	.405	33½	36‍–‍39	26‍–‍52
Philadelphia Phillies	61	92	.399	34½	29‍–‍45	32‍–‍47
Cincinnati Reds	56	98	.364	40	28‍–‍51	28‍–‍47

=== Record vs. opponents ===
1937 National League record Sources:
Team	BSN	BRO	CHC	CIN	NYG	PHI	PIT	STL
Boston	—	15–7	9–13	11–11	10–10	14–8	11–11	9–13
Brooklyn	7–15	—	8–14	12–10–1	6–16	10–11	12–10	7–15–1
Chicago	13–9	14–8	—	14–8	12–10	14–8	9–13	17–5
Cincinnati	11–11	10–12–1	8–14	—	8–14	11–11	1–21	7–15
New York	10–10	16–6	10–12	14–8	—	15–7	16–6	14–8
Philadelphia	8–14	11–10	8–14	11–11	7–15	—	11–11	5–17–2
Pittsburgh	11–11	10–12	13–9	21–1	6–16	11–11	—	14–8
St. Louis	13–9	15–7–1	5–17	15–7	8–14	17–5–2	8–14	—

=== Notable transactions ===
- May 1, 1937: Tommy Thevenow was traded by the Giants to the Boston Bees for Billy Urbanski.

=== Roster ===
1937 New York Giants
Roster
Pitchers: 12 Tom Baker; 19 Don Brennan; 28 Jumbo Brown; 19 Ben Cantwell; 15 Slick Castleman; 14 Dick Coffman; 12 Freddie Fitzsimmons; 19 Frank Gabler; 10 Harry Gumbert; 11 Carl Hubbell; -- Bill Lohrman; 16 Cliff Melton; 17 Hal Schumacher; 18 Al Smith; -- Hy Vandenberg	Catchers: 9 Harry Danning; 25 Ed Madjeski; 8 Gus Mancuso; Infielders: 2 Dick Bartell; 1 Lou Chiozza; 21 Mickey Haslin; 20 Sam Leslie; 25 Johnny McCarthy; 4 Mel Ott; 22 Blondy Ryan; 7 Burgess Whitehead	Outfielders: 3 Wally Berger; 24 Kiddo Davis; 19,26 Hank Leiber; 5 Jo-Jo Moore; 23 Jimmy Ripple; 15 Phil Weintraub	Manager: 30 Bill Terry; Coaches: 31 Dolf Luque; 32 Frank Snyder

== Player stats ==
=== Batting ===
==== Starters by position ====
Note: Pos = Position; G = Games played; AB = At bats; H = Hits; Avg. = Batting average; HR = Home runs; RBI = Runs batted in

Pos	Player	G	AB	H	Avg.	HR	RBI
C	Gus Mancuso	86	287	80	.279	4	39
1B	Johnny McCarthy	114	420	117	.279	10	65
2B	Burgess Whitehead	152	574	164	.286	5	52
SS	Dick Bartell	128	516	158	.306	14	62
3B	Lou Chiozza	117	439	102	.232	4	29
OF	Mel Ott	151	545	160	.294	31	95
OF	Jimmy Ripple	121	426	135	.317	5	66
OF	Jo-Jo Moore	142	580	180	.310	6	57

==== Other batters ====
Note: G = Games played; AB = At bats; H = Hits; Avg. = Batting average; HR = Home runs; RBI = Runs batted in

Player	G	AB	H	Avg.	HR	RBI
Harry Danning	93	292	84	.288	8	51
Wally Berger	59	199	58	.291	12	43
Sam Leslie	72	191	59	.309	3	30
Hank Leiber	51	184	54	.293	4	32
Kiddo Davis	56	76	20	.263	0	9
Blondy Ryan	21	75	18	.240	1	13
Mickey Haslin	27	42	8	.190	0	5
Ed Madjeski	5	15	3	.200	0	2
Phil Weintraub	6	9	3	.333	0	1

=== Pitching ===
==== Starting pitchers ====
Note: G = Games pitched; GS = Games started; IP = Innings pitched; W = Wins; L = Losses; ERA = Earned run average; SO = Strikeouts

Player	G	GS	IP	W	L	ERA	SO
Carl Hubbell	39	32	261.2	22	8	3.20	159
Cliff Melton	46	27	248.0	20	9	2.61	142
Hal Schumacher	38	29	217.2	13	12	3.60	100
Harry Gumbert	34	24	200.1	10	11	3.68	65
Slick Castleman	23	23	160.1	11	6	3.31	78
Hy Vandenberg	1	1	8.0	0	1	7.88	2
Ben Cantwell	1	1	4.0	0	1	9.00	1

==== Other pitchers ====
Note: G = Games pitched; IP = Innings pitched; W = Wins; L = Losses; ERA = Earned run average; SO = Strikeouts

Player	G	IP	W	L	ERA	SO
Al Smith	33	85.2	5	4	4.20	41
Freddie Fitzsimmons	6	27.1	2	2	4.61	13
Bill Lohrman	2	10.0	1	0	0.90	3

==== Relief pitchers ====
Note: G = Games pitched; W = Wins; L = Losses; SV = Saves; ERA = Earned run average; SO = Strikeouts

Player	G	W	L	SV	ERA	SO
Dick Coffman	42	8	3	3	3.04	30
Tom Baker	13	1	0	0	4.06	11
Don Brennan	6	1	0	0	6.75	1
Frank Gabler	6	0	0	0	10.00	3
Jumbo Brown	4	1	0	0	1.04	4

== 1937 World Series ==
=== Game 1 ===
October 6, 1937, at Yankee Stadium in New York City

Team	1	2	3	4	5	6	7	8	9	R	H	E
New York (N)	0	0	0	0	1	0	0	0	0	1	6	2
New York (A)	0	0	0	0	0	7	0	1	x	8	7	0
W: Lefty Gomez (1–0) L: Carl Hubbell (0–1)
HR: NYY – Tony Lazzeri (1)

=== Game 2 ===
October 7, 1937, at Yankee Stadium in New York City

Team	1	2	3	4	5	6	7	8	9	R	H	E
New York (N)	1	0	0	0	0	0	0	0	0	1	7	0
New York (A)	0	0	0	0	2	4	2	0	x	8	12	0
W: Red Ruffing (1–0) L: Cliff Melton (0–1)

=== Game 3 ===
October 8, 1937, at the Polo Grounds in New York City

Team	1	2	3	4	5	6	7	8	9	R	H	E
New York (A)	0	1	2	1	1	0	0	0	0	5	9	0
New York (N)	0	0	0	0	0	0	1	0	0	1	5	4
W: Monte Pearson (1–0) L: Hal Schumacher (0–1) S: Johnny Murphy (1)

=== Game 4 ===
October 9, 1937, at the Polo Grounds in New York City

Team	1	2	3	4	5	6	7	8	9	R	H	E
New York (A)	1	0	1	0	0	0	0	0	1	3	9	0
New York (N)	0	6	0	0	0	0	1	0	x	7	12	3
W: Carl Hubbell (1–1) L: Bump Hadley (0–1)
HR: NYY – Lou Gehrig (1)

=== Game 5 ===
October 10, 1937, at the Polo Grounds in New York City

Team	1	2	3	4	5	6	7	8	9	R	H	E
New York (A)	0	1	1	0	2	0	0	0	0	4	8	0
New York (N)	0	0	2	0	0	0	0	0	0	2	10	0
W: Lefty Gomez (2–0) L: Cliff Melton (0–2)
HR: NYY – Myril Hoag (1), Joe DiMaggio (1) NYG – Mel Ott (1)

== Farm system ==
Level	Team	League	Manager
AA	Jersey City Giants	International League	Travis Jackson
B	Richmond Colts	Piedmont League	Eddie Mooers
C	Greenwood Giants	Cotton States League	Frank Brazill
D	Crisfield Crabbers	Eastern Shore League	Dan Pasquella and Bob Clark
D	Blytheville Giants	Northeast Arkansas League	Herschel Bobo

LEAGUE CHAMPIONS: Blytheville
