= 1937 Boston Bees season =

1937 Boston Bees
- League: National League
- Ballpark: The Bee Hive
- City: Boston, Massachusetts
- Record: 79–73 (.520)
- League place: 5th
- Owners: J.A. Robert Quinn
- Managers: Bill McKechnie
- Radio: WAAB (Fred Hoey)

The 1937 Boston Bees season was the 67th season of the franchise. They finished the season with 79 wins and 73 losses.

== Regular season ==
=== Season standings ===
National League
Team	W	L	Pct.	GB	Home	Road
New York Giants	95	57	.625	—	50‍–‍25	45‍–‍32
Chicago Cubs	93	61	.604	3	46‍–‍32	47‍–‍29
Pittsburgh Pirates	86	68	.558	10	46‍–‍32	40‍–‍36
St. Louis Cardinals	81	73	.526	15	45‍–‍33	36‍–‍40
Boston Bees	79	73	.520	16	43‍–‍33	36‍–‍40
Brooklyn Dodgers	62	91	.405	33½	36‍–‍39	26‍–‍52
Philadelphia Phillies	61	92	.399	34½	29‍–‍45	32‍–‍47
Cincinnati Reds	56	98	.364	40	28‍–‍51	28‍–‍47

=== Record vs. opponents ===
1937 National League record Sources:
Team	BSN	BRO	CHC	CIN	NYG	PHI	PIT	STL
Boston	—	15–7	9–13	11–11	10–10	14–8	11–11	9–13
Brooklyn	7–15	—	8–14	12–10–1	6–16	10–11	12–10	7–15–1
Chicago	13–9	14–8	—	14–8	12–10	14–8	9–13	17–5
Cincinnati	11–11	10–12–1	8–14	—	8–14	11–11	1–21	7–15
New York	10–10	16–6	10–12	14–8	—	15–7	16–6	14–8
Philadelphia	8–14	11–10	8–14	11–11	7–15	—	11–11	5–17–2
Pittsburgh	11–11	10–12	13–9	21–1	6–16	11–11	—	14–8
St. Louis	13–9	15–7–1	5–17	15–7	8–14	17–5–2	8–14	—

=== Notable transactions ===
- May 1, 1937: Billy Urbanski was traded by the Bees to the New York Giants for Tommy Thevenow.

=== Roster ===
1937 Boston Bees
Roster
Pitchers: 18 Guy Bush; 16 Lou Fette; 15 Vic Frazier; 19 Frank Gabler; 20 Ira Hutchinson; 17 Johnny Lanning; 14 Danny MacFayden; -- Milt Shoffner; 25 Bob Smith; 23 Jim Turner; 11 Roy Weir	Catchers: 7 Al López; 10 Ray Mueller; -- Johnny Riddle; 22 Link Wasem; Infielders: 3 Tony Cuccinello; 2 Gil English; 5 Elbie Fletcher; 29 Eddie Mayo; 32 Tommy Thevenow; 8 Rabbit Warstler	Outfielders: 4 Wally Berger; 6 Vince DiMaggio; 9 Debs Garms; 12 Roy Johnson; 19 Beauty McGowan; 1 Gene Moore; 24 Bobby Reis; Other batters: 12 Buck Jordan; -- Billy Urbanski	Manager: 33 Bill McKechnie; Coaches: 31 Hank Gowdy

== Player stats ==
=== Batting ===
==== Starters by position ====
Note: Pos = Position; G = Games played; AB = At bats; H = Hits; Avg. = Batting average; HR = Home runs; RBI = Runs batted in

Pos	Player	G	AB	H	Avg.	HR	RBI
C	Al López	105	334	68	.204	3	38
1B	Elbie Fletcher	148	539	133	.247	1	38
2B	Tony Cuccinello	152	575	156	.271	11	80
SS	Rabbit Warstler	149	555	124	.223	3	36
3B	Gil English	79	269	78	.290	2	37
OF	Gene Moore	148	561	159	.283	16	70
OF	Vince DiMaggio	132	493	126	.256	13	69
OF	Debs Garms	125	478	124	.259	2	37

==== Other batters ====
Note: G = Games played; AB = At bats; H = Hits; Avg. = Batting average; HR = Home runs; RBI = Runs batted in

Player	G	AB	H	Avg.	HR	RBI
Roy Johnson	85	260	72	.277	3	22
Ray Mueller	64	187	47	.251	2	26
Eddie Mayo	65	172	39	.227	1	18
Wally Berger	30	113	31	.274	5	22
Bobby Reis	45	86	21	.244	0	6
Tommy Thevenow	21	34	4	.118	0	2
Beauty McGowan	9	12	1	.083	0	0
Buck Jordan	8	8	2	.250	0	0
Johnny Riddle	2	3	0	.000	0	0
Billy Urbanski	1	1	0	.000	0	0
Link Wasem	2	1	0	.000	0	0

=== Pitching ===
==== Starting pitchers ====
Note: G = Games pitched; IP = Innings pitched; W = Wins; L = Losses; ERA = Earned run average; SO = Strikeouts

Player	G	IP	W	L	ERA	SO
Lou Fette	35	259.0	20	10	2.88	70
Jim Turner	33	256.2	20	11	2.38	69
Danny MacFayden	32	246.0	14	14	2.93	70
Milt Shoffner	6	42.2	3	1	2.53	13

==== Other pitchers ====
Note: G = Games pitched; IP = Innings pitched; W = Wins; L = Losses; ERA = Earned run average; SO = Strikeouts

Player	G	IP	W	L	ERA	SO
Guy Bush	32	180.2	8	15	3.54	56
Johnny Lanning	32	116.2	5	7	3.93	37
Ira Hutchinson	31	91.2	4	6	3.73	29
Frank Gabler	19	76.0	4	7	5.09	19
Roy Weir	10	33.0	1	1	3.82	8

==== Relief pitchers ====
Note: G = Games pitched; W = Wins; L = Losses; SV = Saves; ERA = Earned run average; SO = Strikeouts

Player	G	W	L	SV	ERA	SO
Bob Smith	18	0	1	3	4.09	14
Bobby Reis	4	0	0	0	1.80	0
Vic Frazier	3	0	0	0	5.63	2

== Farm system ==
Level	Team	League	Manager
A	Scranton Miners	New York–Pennsylvania League	Bob Coleman
B	Columbia Senators	Sally League	Eddie Onslow
C	Zanesville Grays	Middle Atlantic League	Possum Whitted
D	South Boston-Halifax Twins	Bi-State League	Jimmy Shelton
D	Salisbury Bees	North Carolina State League	Blackie Carter
D	Beaver Falls Bees	Pennsylvania State Association	Pep Kennedy
