= 1937 St. Louis Cardinals season =

Major League Baseball season

1937 St. Louis Cardinals
- League: National League
- Ballpark: Sportsman's Park
- City: St. Louis, Missouri
- Record: 81–73 (.526)
- League place: 4th
- Owners: Sam Breadon
- General managers: Branch Rickey
- Managers: Frankie Frisch
- Radio: KMOX (France Laux, Jim Alt); KWK (Ray Schmidt, Johnny O'Hara, Allan Anthony)

The 1937 St. Louis Cardinals season was the team's 56th season in St. Louis, Missouri and the 46th season in the National League. The Cardinals went 81–73 during the season and finished fourth in the National League.

== Offseason ==
At the start of January 1937, general manager Branch Rickey named Robert L. Finch vice president of all Cardinals minor league baseball teams. Their star pitcher, Dizzy Dean, spent the preseason in a contract dispute, even threatening to quit baseball. He finally signed for an estimated $24,000 and a lifetime supply of Cracker Jack and hot wings on March 19.

== Regular season ==
As the season was set to begin, the Cardinals were considered the favorites to win the National League and face the New York Yankees in the 1937 World Series.

Outfielder Joe Medwick won the MVP Award this year, batting .374, with 31 home runs and 154 RBIs. He also won the Triple Crown, the last National League player to do so. Conversely, Dizzy Dean battled injuries, staged a mid-game strike, engaged in multiple fights and was even suspended for a time. Dean finished with a 13–10 record and only one win after the All-Star Break and was named the "biggest bust of the year" by an Associated Press poll after the season.

=== Season summary ===
The Cardinals started their season strongly, winning seven of their first eight games and jumping out to a 1½-game lead by the end of April. They were in second place as late as June 27, just half a game out of first place with a record of 35–24. However, they never rose any higher, spending the rest of the year in either third or fourth place, ending the season by losing six of eight and with their largest deficit of the year of 15 games out of first place.

=== Season standings ===
National League
Team	W	L	Pct.	GB	Home	Road
New York Giants	95	57	.625	—	50‍–‍25	45‍–‍32
Chicago Cubs	93	61	.604	3	46‍–‍32	47‍–‍29
Pittsburgh Pirates	86	68	.558	10	46‍–‍32	40‍–‍36
St. Louis Cardinals	81	73	.526	15	45‍–‍33	36‍–‍40
Boston Bees	79	73	.520	16	43‍–‍33	36‍–‍40
Brooklyn Dodgers	62	91	.405	33½	36‍–‍39	26‍–‍52
Philadelphia Phillies	61	92	.399	34½	29‍–‍45	32‍–‍47
Cincinnati Reds	56	98	.364	40	28‍–‍51	28‍–‍47

=== Record vs. opponents ===
1937 National League record Sources:
Team	BSN	BRO	CHC	CIN	NYG	PHI	PIT	STL
Boston	—	15–7	9–13	11–11	10–10	14–8	11–11	9–13
Brooklyn	7–15	—	8–14	12–10–1	6–16	10–11	12–10	7–15–1
Chicago	13–9	14–8	—	14–8	12–10	14–8	9–13	17–5
Cincinnati	11–11	10–12–1	8–14	—	8–14	11–11	1–21	7–15
New York	10–10	16–6	10–12	14–8	—	15–7	16–6	14–8
Philadelphia	8–14	11–10	8–14	11–11	7–15	—	11–11	5–17–2
Pittsburgh	11–11	10–12	13–9	21–1	6–16	11–11	—	14–8
St. Louis	13–9	15–7–1	5–17	15–7	8–14	17–5–2	8–14	—

=== Roster ===
1937 St. Louis Cardinals
Roster
Pitchers: 29 Nate Andrews; 27 Sheriff Blake; 31 Johnnie Chambers; 17 Dizzy Dean; 21 Paul Dean; 16 Jesse Haines; 27 Ray Harrell; 12 Si Johnson; 24 Nubs Kleinke; 22 Howie Krist; 24 Bill McGee; 19 Mike Ryba; 28 Tom Sunkel; 18 Lon Warneke; 20 Bob Weiland; 22 Abe White; 27 Jim Winford	Catchers: 30 Herb Bremer; 9 Bruce Ogrodowski; 8 Mickey Owen; Infielders: 14 Frenchy Bordagaray; 15 Jimmy Brown; 2 Leo Durocher; 3 Frankie Frisch; 5 Don Gutteridge; 6 Stu Martin; 10 Johnny Mize; 22 Dick Siebert	Outfielders: 1 Pepper Martin; 7 Joe Medwick; 22 Randy Moore; 11 Terry Moore; 4 Don Padgett	Manager: 3 Frankie Frisch; Coaches: 25 Mike González; 26 Buzzy Wares

== Player stats ==
=== Batting ===
==== Starters by position ====
Note: Pos = Position; G = Games played; AB = At bats; H = Hits; Avg. = Batting average; HR = Home runs; RBI = Runs batted in

Pos	Player	G	AB	H	Avg.	HR	RBI
C	Bruce Ogrodowski	90	279	65	.233	3	31
1B	Johnny Mize	145	560	204	.364	25	113
2B	Jimmy Brown	138	525	145	.276	2	53
SS	Leo Durocher	135	477	97	.203	1	47
3B	Don Gutteridge	119	447	121	.271	7	61
OF	Joe Medwick	156	633	237	.374	31	154
OF	Don Padgett	123	446	140	.314	10	74
OF	Terry Moore	115	461	123	.267	5	43

==== Other batters ====
Note: G = Games played; AB = At bats; H = Hits; Avg. = Batting average; HR = Home runs; RBI = Runs batted in

Player	G	AB	H	Avg.	HR	RBI
Pepper Martin	98	339	103	.304	5	38
Frenchy Bordagaray	96	300	88	.293	1	37
Mickey Owen	80	234	54	.231	0	20
Stu Martin	90	223	58	.260	1	17
Dick Siebert	22	38	7	.184	0	2
Herb Bremer	11	33	7	.212	0	3
Frankie Frisch	17	32	7	.219	0	4
Randy Moore	8	7	0	.000	0	0

=== Pitching ===
==== Starting pitchers ====
Note: G = Games pitched; IP = Innings pitched; W = Wins; L = Losses; ERA = Earned run average; SO = Strikeouts

Player	G	IP	W	L	ERA	SO
Bob Weiland	41	264.1	15	14	3.54	105
Lon Warneke	36	238.2	18	11	4.53	87
Dizzy Dean	27	197.1	13	10	2.69	120

==== Other pitchers ====
Note: G = Games pitched; IP = Innings pitched; W = Wins; L = Losses; ERA = Earned run average; SO = Strikeouts

Player	G	IP	W	L	ERA	SO
Si Johnson	38	192.1	12	12	3.32	64
Mike Ryba	38	135.0	9	6	4.13	57
Ray Harrell	35	96.2	3	7	5.87	41
Jesse Haines	16	65.2	3	3	4.52	18
Jim Winford	16	46.1	2	4	5.83	17
Howie Krist	6	27.2	3	1	4.23	6
Nub Kleinke	5	20.2	1	1	4.79	9
Bill McGee	4	14.0	1	0	2.57	9

==== Relief pitchers ====
Note: G = Games pitched; W = Wins; L = Losses; SV = Saves; ERA = Earned run average; SO = Strikeouts

Player	G	W	L	SV	ERA	SO
Sheriff Blake	14	0	3	0	3.71	20
Tom Sunkel	9	0	0	1	2.76	9
Abe White	5	0	1	0	6.75	2
Nate Andrews	4	0	0	0	4.00	6
Johnnie Chambers	2	0	0	0	18.00	1
Paul Dean	1	0	0	0	inf	0

== Farm system ==
Level	Team	League	Manager
AA	Columbus Red Birds	American Association	Burt Shotton
AA	Rochester Red Wings	International League	Ray Blades
AA	Sacramento Solons	Pacific Coast League	Bill Killefer
A1	Houston Buffaloes	Texas League	Johnny Watwood, Mike Cvengros and Ira Smith
A	Cedar Rapids Raiders	Western League	Cap Crossley
B	Decatur Commodores	Illinois–Indiana–Iowa League	George Payne
B	Asheville Tourists	Piedmont League	Hal Anderson
B	Columbus Red Birds	Sally League	Fred Hofmann
B	Mobile Shippers	Southeastern League	Marty Purtell
C	Pine Bluff Judges	Cotton States League	Leroy "Cowboy" Jones
C	Jacksonville Jax	East Texas League	Tony Robello
C	Portsmouth Red Birds	Middle Atlantic League	Benny Borgmann
C	Springfield Cardinals	Western Association	Clay Hopper
C	Union City Springers	Alabama–Florida League	Tommy West
D	Albuquerque Cardinals	Arizona–Texas League	Bill DeLancey
D	Monett Red Birds	Arkansas–Missouri League	Ken Blackman and Joe Davis
D	Martinsville Manufacturers	Bi-State League	Bill Rea and Arnold Anderson
D	Kinston Eagles	Coastal Plain League	Krim Bess and Vernon Taylor
D	Cambridge Cardinals	Eastern Shore League	Fred Lucas
D	New Iberia Cardinals	Evangeline League	Don Motlow and Fred Hawn

Level	Team	League	Manager
D	Daytona Beach Islanders	Florida State League	Jimmie Sanders
D	Albany Travelers	Georgia–Florida League	Bob Rice
D	Union City Greyhounds	KITTY League	John Antonelli
D	Grand Island Red Birds	Nebraska State League	Joe McDermott
D	Mitchell Kernels	Nebraska State League	Bud Knox
D	Shelby Cardinals	North Carolina State League	George Silvey
D	Caruthersville Pilots	Northeast Arkansas League	Harrison Wickel
D	Newport Cardinals	Northeast Arkansas League	Thorpe Hamilton
D	Crookston Pirates	Northern League	Julian Wera and Erwin Schueren
D	Duluth Dukes	Northern League	Dutch Dorman
D	Fostoria Red Birds	Ohio State League	John Cavanaugh, Red Jenkins, Rex Bowen and Harry Aldrick
D	Monessen Cardinals	Pennsylvania State Association	John Lynch and Ollie Vanek
D	Midland Cardinals	West Texas–New Mexico League	Wray Query and Joe Davis

LEAGUE CHAMPIONS: Columbus (AA), Cedar Rapids, Mobile, Jacksonville, Springfield, Albuquerque, Duluth
Midland club folded, July 9, 1937
