= 1937 Chicago Cubs season =

1937 Chicago Cubs
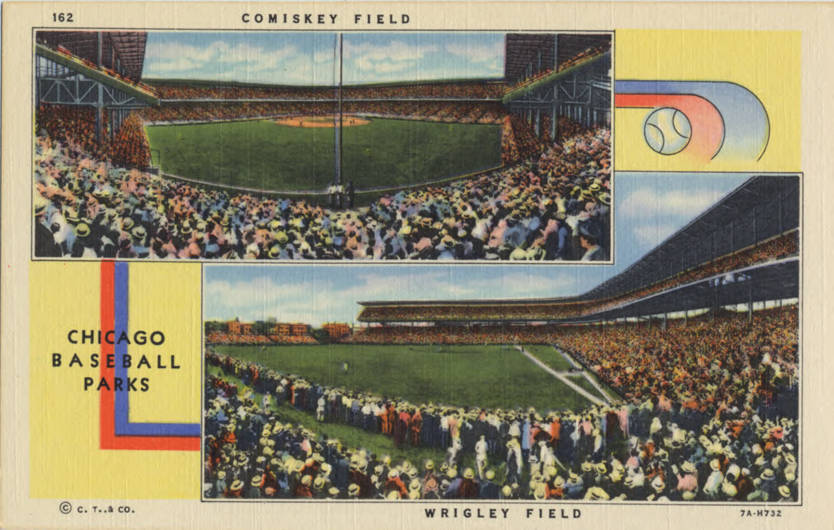
- A 1937 postcard of Wrigley Field, home of the Cubs, and Comiskey Field
- League: National League
- Ballpark: Wrigley Field
- City: Chicago
- Record: 93–61 (.604)
- League place: 2nd
- Owners: Philip K. Wrigley
- General managers: Charles Weber
- Managers: Charlie Grimm
- Radio: WGN (Bob Elson); WBBM (George Sutherland, Pat Flanagan); WCFL (Hal Totten); WIND (Russ Hodges); WJJD (John Harrington)

The 1937 Chicago Cubs season was the 66th season of the Chicago Cubs franchise, the 62nd in the National League and the 22nd at Wrigley Field. The Cubs finished second in the National League with a record of 93–61.

== Regular season ==
=== Season standings ===
National League
Team	W	L	Pct.	GB	Home	Road
New York Giants	95	57	.625	—	50‍–‍25	45‍–‍32
Chicago Cubs	93	61	.604	3	46‍–‍32	47‍–‍29
Pittsburgh Pirates	86	68	.558	10	46‍–‍32	40‍–‍36
St. Louis Cardinals	81	73	.526	15	45‍–‍33	36‍–‍40
Boston Bees	79	73	.520	16	43‍–‍33	36‍–‍40
Brooklyn Dodgers	62	91	.405	33½	36‍–‍39	26‍–‍52
Philadelphia Phillies	61	92	.399	34½	29‍–‍45	32‍–‍47
Cincinnati Reds	56	98	.364	40	28‍–‍51	28‍–‍47

=== Record vs. opponents ===
1937 National League record Sources:
Team	BSN	BRO	CHC	CIN	NYG	PHI	PIT	STL
Boston	—	15–7	9–13	11–11	10–10	14–8	11–11	9–13
Brooklyn	7–15	—	8–14	12–10–1	6–16	10–11	12–10	7–15–1
Chicago	13–9	14–8	—	14–8	12–10	14–8	9–13	17–5
Cincinnati	11–11	10–12–1	8–14	—	8–14	11–11	1–21	7–15
New York	10–10	16–6	10–12	14–8	—	15–7	16–6	14–8
Philadelphia	8–14	11–10	8–14	11–11	7–15	—	11–11	5–17–2
Pittsburgh	11–11	10–12	13–9	21–1	6–16	11–11	—	14–8
St. Louis	13–9	15–7–1	5–17	15–7	8–14	17–5–2	8–14	—

=== Roster ===
1937 Chicago Cubs
Roster
Pitchers: 18 Clay Bryant; 16 Tex Carleton; 22 Curt Davis; 14 Larry French; 49 Kirby Higbe; 43 Newt Kimball; 11 Bill Lee; 39 Bob Logan; 24 Roy Parmelee; 17 Charlie Root; 21 Clyde Shoun	Catchers: 41 John Bottarini; 2 Gabby Hartnett; 12 Ken O'Dea; Infielders: 3 Ripper Collins; 15 Lonny Frey; 6 Stan Hack; 4 Billy Herman; 5 Billy Jurges	Outfielders: 23 Phil Cavarretta; 9 Frank Demaree; 7 Augie Galan; 8 Joe Marty; 43 Carl Reynolds; 42 Tuck Stainback; Other batters: 39 Bob Garbark; 43 Dutch Meyer	Manager: 1 Charlie Grimm; Coaches: 19 Red Corriden; 20 Roy Johnson

== Player stats ==
=== Batting ===
==== Starters by position ====
Note: Pos = Position; G = Games played; AB = At bats; H = Hits; Avg. = Batting average; HR = Home runs; RBI = Runs batted in

Pos	Player	G	AB	H	Avg.	HR	RBI
C	Gabby Hartnett	110	356	126	.354	12	82
1B	Ripper Collins	115	456	125	.274	16	71
2B	Billy Herman	138	564	189	.335	8	65
SS	Billy Jurges	129	450	134	.298	1	65
3B	Stan Hack	154	582	173	.297	2	63
OF	Joe Marty	88	290	84	.290	5	44
OF	Augie Galan	147	611	154	.252	18	78
OF	Frank Demaree	154	615	199	.324	17	115

==== Other batters ====
Note: G = Games played; AB = At bats; H = Hits; Avg. = Batting average; HR = Home runs; RBI = Runs batted in

Player	G	AB	H	Avg.	HR	RBI
Phil Cavarretta	106	329	94	.286	5	56
Ken O'Dea	83	219	66	.301	4	32
Lonny Frey	78	198	55	.278	1	22
Tuck Stainback	72	160	37	.231	0	14
John Bottarini	26	40	11	.275	1	7
Carl Reynolds	7	11	3	.273	0	1
Bob Garbark	1	1	0	.000	0	0
Dutch Meyer	1	0	0	----	0	0

=== Pitching ===
==== Starting pitchers ====
Note: G = Games pitched; IP = Innings pitched; W = Wins; L = Losses; ERA = Earned run average; SO = Strikeouts

Player	G	IP	W	L	ERA	SO
Bill Lee	42	272.1	14	15	3.54	108
Tex Carleton	32	208.1	16	8	3.15	105

==== Other pitchers ====
Note: G = Games pitched; IP = Innings pitched; W = Wins; L = Losses; ERA = Earned run average; SO = Strikeouts

Player	G	IP	W	L	ERA	SO
Larry French	42	208.0	16	10	3.98	100
Charlie Root	43	178.2	13	5	3.38	74
Roy Parmelee	33	145.2	7	8	5.13	55
Clay Bryant	38	135.1	9	3	4.26	75
Curt Davis	28	123.2	10	5	4.08	32
Clyde Shoun	37	93.0	7	7	5.61	43

==== Relief pitchers ====
Note: G = Games pitched; W = Wins; L = Losses; SV = Saves; ERA = Earned run average; SO = Strikeouts

Player	G	W	L	SV	ERA	SO
Bob Logan	4	0	0	1	1.42	2
Newt Kimball	2	0	0	0	10.80	0
Kirby Higbe	1	1	0	0	5.40	2

== Farm system ==
Level	Team	League	Manager
AA	Los Angeles Angels	Pacific Coast League	Truck Hannah
B	Moline Plowboys	Illinois–Indiana–Iowa League	Mike Gazella
B	Portsmouth Cubs	Piedmont League	Elmer Yoter
C	Ponca City Angels	Western Association	Pat Veltman
D	Eau Claire Bears	Northern League	Johnny Mostil

LEAGUE CHAMPIONS: Moline
