= Link Wasem =

American baseball player (1911-1979)

- Catcher
- Born: January 30, 1911; Birmingham, Ohio, US
- Died: March 6, 1979 (aged 68); South Laguna, California, US
- Batted: Right Threw: Right

MLB debut
- May 5, 1937, for the Boston Bees

Last MLB appearance
- May 23, 1937, for the Boston Bees

MLB statistics
- Games played: 2
- At bats: 1
- Hits: 0
- Stats at Baseball Reference

Teams
- Boston Bees (1937)

Lincoln William "Link" Wasem (January 30, 1911 – March 6, 1979) was an American professional player. Wasem played for the Boston Bees in 1937 and played in the minor leagues from 1933 to 1937. He batted and threw right-handed.

== Early life and career ==
Wasem was born on January 30, 1911, in Birmingham, Ohio. Growing up, he played both baseball and basketball and was named to a Northwest Ohio all-star basketball team. He began his career with the semi-professional Wakeman Red Caps of Wakeman, Ohio, playing for the club in 1930 and 1931.

== Minor leagues ==
In October 1932, he was scouted and signed by Columbus Red Birds' owner Larry MacPhail for Columbus' major league affiliate, the St. Louis Cardinals, and reported to the Springfield Cardinals of the Western League in April 1933. After losing his roster spot to Herb Bremer, he was released and signed with the Joplin Miners in late April.

Wasem spent the beginning of the 1933 season backing up veteran catcher Don Benn, but took over the starting role when Benn was released. He ultimately played in 86 games for Joplin in 1933, finishing the year with 80 hits and a .292 batting average. In November 1933, his contract was purchased by the Buffalo Bisons. In Buffalo, he took catching and outfield lessons from future Baseball Hall of Famer and Bisons' manager Ray Schalk. He was optioned to the Wilkes-Barre Barons for outfielder Jake Plummer in late-May 1934, but was returned to the Bisons on July 20. He batted .323 for Buffalo and, after a contract holdout in the offseason, resigned with the club in early-March 1935. In late-August, he married Marguerite Rickers at St. Joseph Cathedral in Buffalo and the couple were given a silver service set by Bisons' players and management before a game on August 26.

He regressed to a .207 batting average in 63 games in 1935, but resigned for the 1936 season in late-February. Wasem was again optioned to Wilkes-Barre on May 19, where he transitioned and became a right fielder. After hitting .332 with 12 home runs in 77 games with Wilkes-Barre, the Bisons recalled Wasem on August 12.

== Boston Bees ==
Before the 1937 began, Wasem demanded that he be traded or sold and refused to report to Buffalo. In early April, the Bisons sold him to the Boston Bees. He made his major league debut on May 5 against the St. Louis Cardinals, taking over for catcher Al Lopez on defense in the top of the sixth inning. He was removed for pinch hitter Beauty McGowan in the bottom of the seventh inning without recording an at bat. The Bees' claim on Wasem was originally scheduled to end on May 15, but Buffalo agreed to extend it to June 1. He appeared in one final game with Boston on May 23 against the Chicago Cubs, taking over for Lopez in the seventh inning and flying out against Charlie Root for the final out of the game in what would be his only career at bat.

== Return to minor leagues ==
Boston retained Wasem's contract for the remainder of the 1937 season, and spent the remainder of the year with the club's New York–Pennsylvania League affiliate, the Scranton Miners. In January, his contract was sold to the Hollywood Stars in the Pacific Coast League. He never appeared in a regular season game for Hollywood, and instead returned to the semi-professional Wakeman Red Caps.
