= Bob Allen (1930s pitcher) =

American baseball player (1914-2005)

- Pitcher
- Born: July 2, 1914; Smithville, Tennessee, U.S.
- Died: October 30, 2005 (aged 91); Chesapeake, Virginia, U.S.
- Batted: Right Threw: Right

MLB debut
- September 19, 1937, for the Philadelphia Phillies

Last MLB appearance
- October 2, 1937, for the Philadelphia Phillies

MLB statistics
- Win–loss record: 0–1
- Earned run average: 6.75
- Strikeouts: 8
- Stats at Baseball Reference

Teams
- Philadelphia Phillies (1937)

Robert Earl Allen (July 2, 1914 – October 30, 2005) was a Major League Baseball pitcher. Allen played for the Philadelphia Phillies in 1937. He batted and threw right-handed.

Pitching in a total of 3 games, Allen's only decision came on October 2, 1937, when he started the game and pitched 5 2/3 innings, surrendered 7 runs (4 earned), as the Phillies were defeated, 1–7, to the Boston Bees at Braves Field.

Allen was born in Smithville, Tennessee, and died in Chesapeake, Virginia.
