= Jim Winford =

American baseball player (1909–1970)

- Pitcher
- Born: October 9, 1909; Shelbyville, Tennessee, U.S.
- Died: December 16, 1970 (aged 61); Miami, Oklahoma, U.S.
- Batted: Right Threw: Right

MLB debut
- September 10, 1932, for the St. Louis Cardinals

Last MLB appearance
- September 22, 1938, for the Brooklyn Dodgers

MLB statistics
- Win–loss record: 14–18
- Earned run average: 4.56
- Strikeouts: 107
- Stats at Baseball Reference

Teams
- St. Louis Cardinals (1932, 1934–1937); Brooklyn Dodgers (1938)

James Head Winford (October 9, 1909 – December 16, 1970), nicknamed "Cowboy", was an American professional baseball pitcher. He played all or part of six seasons in Major League Baseball between 1932 and 1938 for the St. Louis Cardinals and the Brooklyn Dodgers.

Born in Shelbyville, Tennessee, Winford died on December 16, 1970, in Miami, Oklahoma.
