= Herb Bremer =

American baseball player (1913–1979)

- Catcher
- Born: October 25, 1913; Chicago, Illinois
- Died: November 28, 1979 (aged 66); Columbus, Georgia
- Batted: Right Threw: Right

MLB debut
- September 16, 1937, for the St. Louis Cardinals

Last MLB appearance
- September 3, 1939, for the St. Louis Cardinals

MLB statistics
- Batting average: .212
- Home runs: 2
- Runs batted in: 18
- Stats at Baseball Reference

Teams
- St. Louis Cardinals (1937–1939)

Herbert Frederick Bremer (October 25, 1913 – November 28, 1979) was an American professional baseball player whose career included 70 games in Major League Baseball, primarily as a catcher, for the 1937–1939 St. Louis Cardinals. Born in Chicago, Bremer batted and threw right-handed, and was listed as 6 feet (1.8 m) tall and 195 pounds (88 kg).

Bremer joined the Cardinals' farm system at age 18 in 1932. In September 1937, he was called to St. Louis after a successful season in the higher-level SALLY League. After an 11-game trial with the MLB Redbirds that autumn, he spent the full 1938 campaign as the Cardinals' second-string catcher, playing behind Mickey Owen. That year, he batted .219 with 33 hits in 50 games. He then spent most of 1939 at the top level of the minor leagues with the Columbus Red Birds of the American Association. He wrapped up his major-league tenure by appearing nine games for the 1939 Cardinals.

Altogether, he batted .212 with 41 hits in 70 big-league games. Among those hits were two 1938 home runs, off Lou Fette of the Boston Bees on May 8 and Tot Pressnell of the Brooklyn Dodgers on July 22. He was credited with 18 career runs batted in.

After the 1942 minor-league campaign, Bremer served for three years in the United States Army during World War II. He returned to baseball in 1946 for 87 games with the Little Rock Travelers of the Double-A Southern Association, then left Organized Baseball.
