= Gil English =

American baseball player (1909–1996)

- Third baseman
- Born: July 2, 1909; Glenola, North Carolina, U.S.
- Died: August 31, 1996 (aged 87); Trinity, North Carolina, U.S.
- Batted: Right Threw: Right

MLB debut
- September 20, 1931, for the New York Giants

Last MLB appearance
- June 11, 1944, for the Brooklyn Dodgers

MLB statistics
- Batting average: .245
- Home runs: 8
- Runs batted in: 90
- Stats at Baseball Reference

Teams
- New York Giants (1931–1932); Detroit Tigers (1936–1937); Boston Bees (1937–1938); Brooklyn Dodgers (1944)

Gilbert Raymond English (July 2, 1909 – August 31, 1996) was an American professional baseball third baseman. He played in Major League Baseball (MLB) for the New York Giants, Detroit Tigers, Boston Bees, and Brooklyn Dodgers between 1931 and 1944.

In 240 games over six seasons, English posted a .245 batting average (194-for-791) with 75 runs, 8 home runs, 90 RBIs and 56 bases on balls. He finished his career with a .948 fielding percentage.
