= John Bottarini =

American baseball player (1908–1976)

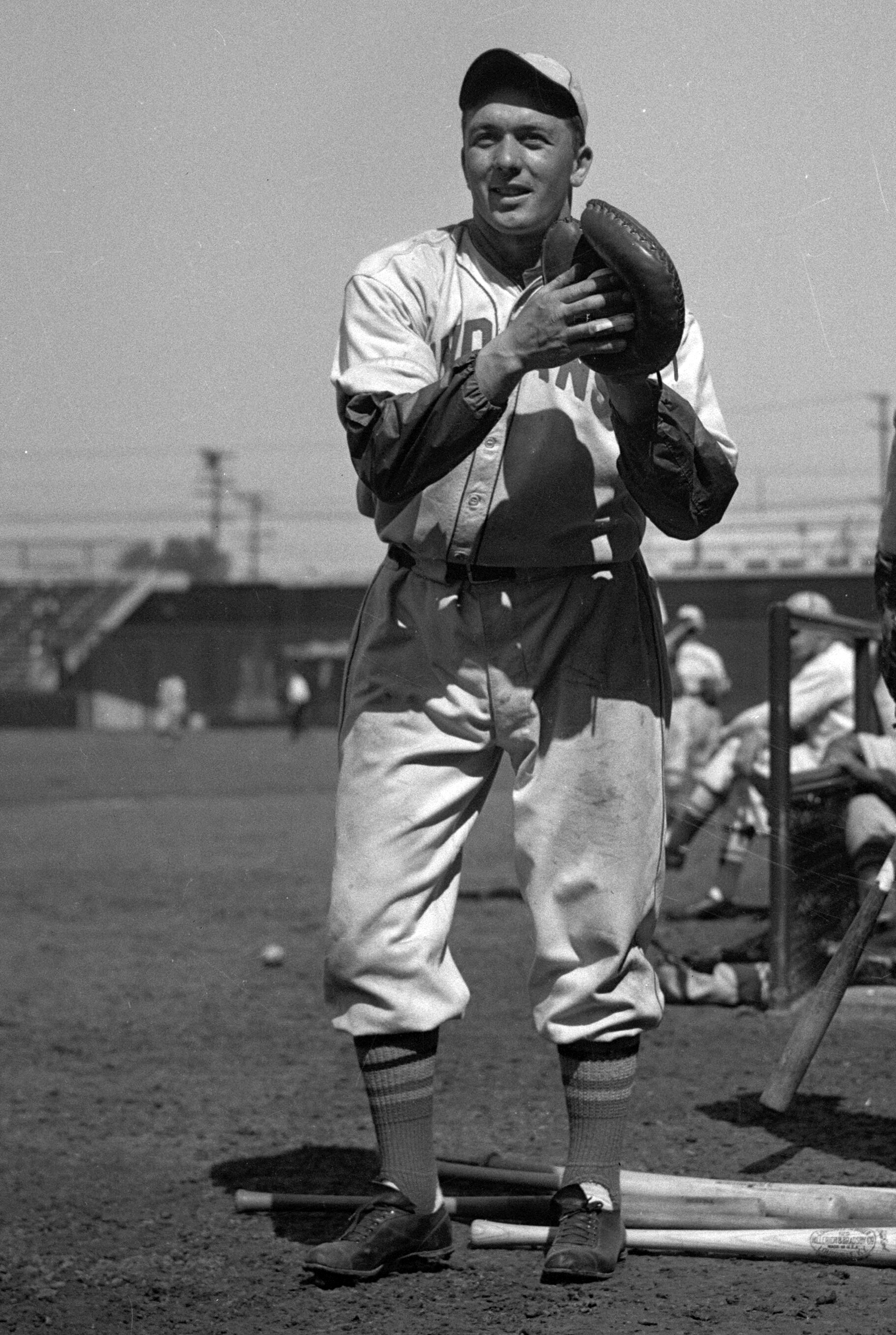
- Catcher / Left fielder
- Born: September 14, 1908; Crockett, California, U.S.
- Died: October 8, 1976 (aged 68); Jemez Springs, New Mexico, U.S.
- Batted: Right Threw: Right

MLB debut
- April 22, 1937, for the Chicago Cubs

Last MLB appearance
- September 9, 1937, for the Chicago Cubs

MLB statistics
- Batting average: .275
- Home runs: 1
- Runs batted in: 7
- Stats at Baseball Reference

Teams
- Chicago Cubs (1937)

John Charles Bottarini (September 14, 1908 – October 8, 1976) was an American right-handed catcher for the Chicago Cubs during the 1937 season. He did not see much playing time as the Cubs were anchored behind the plate by future Hall of Famer Gabby Hartnett. Bottarini appeared in 26 games for the Cubs that season and put up decent offensive numbers, hitting .275 in 40 at-bats with three runs, three doubles, a home run and 7 RBI. He made 19 appearances in the field—18 at catcher and one in the outfield. He handled 53 total chances (44 putouts, 9 assists) at catcher perfectly for a 1.000 fielding percentage.

Before his season in Chicago, Bottarini played for the Los Angeles Angels of the Pacific Coast League. Bottarini was catching for the Angels when a foul tip ball struck the end of one of his right-hand fingers, causing a deep laceration. After the 1937 season, Bottarini was sold to Memphis of the minor league Southern Association. He would never play in the major leagues again.

Bottarini died by drowning after a boating accident on October 8, 1976, in Jemez Springs, New Mexico.
