= Ed Madjeski =

American baseball player (1908–1994)

- Catcher
- Born: July 20, 1908; Far Rockaway, New York, U.S.
- Died: November 11, 1994 (aged 86); Montgomery, Ohio, U.S.
- Batted: Right Threw: Right

MLB debut
- May 2, 1932, for the Philadelphia Athletics

Last MLB appearance
- October 3, 1937, for the New York Giants

MLB statistics
- Batting average: .241
- Home runs: 5
- Runs batted in: 56
- Stats at Baseball Reference

Teams
- Philadelphia Athletics (1932–1934); Chicago White Sox (1934); New York Giants (1937)

Edward William Madjeski (born Edward William Majewski on July 20, 1908) was an American professional baseball catcher. He played all or part of four seasons in Major League Baseball (MLB), from 1932 through 1937, for the Philadelphia Athletics, Chicago White Sox, and New York Giants. He also spent several years in the minors as a manager, although only one of those was a complete season: 1946 with the Orlando Senators of the Florida State League.

In 166 games over four seasons, Madjeski posted a .241 batting average (116-for-481) with 58 runs, 5 home runs and 56 runs batted in.

During his career, his surname was variously spelled as Majewski, Madjeske, Majeck, Madjeskie, Maadjeskey and Majeski.
