= Lou Fette =

American baseball player (1907-1981)

- Lou Fette, 1938 Wheaties Series
- Pitcher
- Born: March 15, 1907; Alma, Missouri, U.S.
- Died: January 3, 1981 (aged 73); Warrensburg, Missouri, U.S.
- Batted: Right Threw: Right

MLB debut
- April 26, 1937, for the Boston Bees

Last MLB appearance
- June 22, 1945, for the Boston Braves

MLB statistics
- Win–loss record: 41–40
- Earned run average: 3.15
- Strikeouts: 194
- Stats at Baseball Reference

Teams
- Boston Bees (1937–1940); Brooklyn Dodgers (1940); Boston Braves (1945)

Career highlights and awards
- All-Star (1939)

Louis Henry William Fette (March 15, 1907 – January 3, 1981) was an American professional baseball player. The native of Alma, Missouri, was a right-handed pitcher who appeared in 109 games in Major League Baseball—107 of them for Boston's National League franchise—during all or parts of five seasons between 1937 and 1945. He was listed as 6 feet 1 inch (1.85 m) tall and 200 pounds (91 kg). He attended Missouri Valley College.

== Playing career ==
Fette's pro career began in 1928. He spent nine years (1928–1936) in minor league baseball, including eight full seasons in the top-level American Association, before his big-league debut as a member of the 1937 Boston Bees. That year, the 30-year-old Fette and another MLB rookie and minor-league veteran, 33-year-old Jim "Milkman" Turner, each won 20 games for the fifth-place Bees.

Fette enjoyed three strong seasons with the Bees, posting a 41–33 won–lost record and an even 3.00 earned run average in 95 games pitched from 1937 to 1939. He threw 14 shutouts and 51 complete games. In 1939 he was named to the National League All-Star team, and hurled two scoreless innings during the Senior Circuit's 3–1 defeat at Yankee Stadium, allowing only one hit and fanning future Hall of Famer Joe Gordon.

But 1939 also saw a decline in Fette's workload and he ended the year with six consecutive losses. Then in 1940, he remained ineffective, losing all five decisions with Boston and posting a poor 5.57 ERA before being waived to the pennant-contending Brooklyn Dodgers on June 21. Fette appeared in only two games for the Dodgers as a relief pitcher, and was sent back to the minor leagues. After spending 1943 and 1944 out of baseball, he returned to the majors with the 1945 Boston Braves—they had returned to their longtime nickname in 1941—for the last year of the World War II manpower shortage, and lost two more decisions, including his final big-league starting assignment. All told, for his five-year MLB career, Fette posted a 41–40 record with 194 strikeouts and a 3.15 ERA in 691 innings pitched. He allowed 658 hits and 248 bases on balls. He did not record a victory, complete game or shutout after 1939, losing his last 13 decisions.

Lou Fette died in Warrensburg, Missouri, at the age of 73 after suffering a heart attack.

== Best season ==
- 1937: 20 wins, 2.88 ERA, five shutouts, 23 complete games, 259 innings – all career-highs

== Highlights ==
- 1939 National League All-Star
- Twice led NL in shutouts (1937, five – 1939, six)
