= Bruce Ogrodowski =

American baseball player (1912–1956)

- Catcher
- Born: February 17, 1912; Hoytville, Pennsylvania, U.S.
- Died: March 5, 1956 (aged 44); San Francisco, California, U.S.
- Batted: Right Threw: Right

MLB debut
- April 14, 1936, for the St. Louis Cardinals

Last MLB appearance
- October 3, 1937, for the St. Louis Cardinals

MLB statistics
- Batting average: .231
- Home runs: 4
- Runs batted in: 51
- Stats at Baseball Reference

Teams
- St. Louis Cardinals (1936–1937)

Ambrose Francis "Bruce" Ogrodowski (February 17, 1912 – March 5, 1956) was an American professional baseball player, a catcher who appeared in 184 Major League games played for the St. Louis Cardinals in 1936–1937. A native of Hoytville, Pennsylvania, he threw and batted right-handed, stood 5 feet 11 inches (1.80 m) tall and weighed 175 pounds (79 kg). His older brother Joe pitched in one Major League game in 1925.

Bruce Ogrodowski was the second-string catcher, behind Spud Davis, for the 1936 Cardinals, appearing in 94 games and batting .228. During a regular season exhibition game in Cleveland that year he was the first Major League Baseball batter to face Bob Feller. In 1937, he appeared in four fewer games but nonetheless was the most-used catcher for the Redbirds; however, he improved his batting average by only five points. The following year, Mickey Owen became the Cardinals' regular catcher, and Ogrodowski was sent to the Rochester Red Wings. He spent the rest of his career in minor league baseball, including nine seasons (1939–1947) in the highly competitive Pacific Coast League for the Sacramento Solons (1939–1940) and San Francisco Seals (1941–1947).

Ogrodowski's 119 Major League hits included 25 doubles, four triples and four home runs. After managing in the farm systems of the Boston Braves and St. Louis Browns, Ogrodowski died at age 44 in San Francisco after having been ill since suffering a stroke in 1953. He was interred at Cypress Lawn Memorial Park.
