= 1937 Pittsburgh Pirates season =

1937 Pittsburgh Pirates
- League: National League
- Ballpark: Forbes Field
- City: Pittsburgh
- Owners: Bill Benswanger
- Managers: Pie Traynor
- Radio: KQV; Jimmy Dudley; WJAS; Rosey Rowswell; WWSW; Claude Haring

The 1937 Pittsburgh Pirates season was the 56th season of the Pittsburgh Pirates franchise; the 51st in the National League. The Pirates finished third in the league standings with a record of 86–68.

== Offseason ==
- December 4, 1936: Ralph Birkofer and Cookie Lavagetto were traded by the Pirates to the Brooklyn Dodgers for Ed Brandt.

== Regular season ==
=== Season standings ===
National League
Team	W	L	Pct.	GB	Home	Road
New York Giants	95	57	.625	—	50‍–‍25	45‍–‍32
Chicago Cubs	93	61	.604	3	46‍–‍32	47‍–‍29
Pittsburgh Pirates	86	68	.558	10	46‍–‍32	40‍–‍36
St. Louis Cardinals	81	73	.526	15	45‍–‍33	36‍–‍40
Boston Bees	79	73	.520	16	43‍–‍33	36‍–‍40
Brooklyn Dodgers	62	91	.405	33½	36‍–‍39	26‍–‍52
Philadelphia Phillies	61	92	.399	34½	29‍–‍45	32‍–‍47
Cincinnati Reds	56	98	.364	40	28‍–‍51	28‍–‍47

=== Record vs. opponents ===
1937 National League record Sources:
Team	BSN	BRO	CHC	CIN	NYG	PHI	PIT	STL
Boston	—	15–7	9–13	11–11	10–10	14–8	11–11	9–13
Brooklyn	7–15	—	8–14	12–10–1	6–16	10–11	12–10	7–15–1
Chicago	13–9	14–8	—	14–8	12–10	14–8	9–13	17–5
Cincinnati	11–11	10–12–1	8–14	—	8–14	11–11	1–21	7–15
New York	10–10	16–6	10–12	14–8	—	15–7	16–6	14–8
Philadelphia	8–14	11–10	8–14	11–11	7–15	—	11–11	5–17–2
Pittsburgh	11–11	10–12	13–9	21–1	6–16	11–11	—	14–8
St. Louis	13–9	15–7–1	5–17	15–7	8–14	17–5–2	8–14	—

=== Game log ===
1937 Game Log: 86–68 (Home: 46–32; Away: 40–36)
April: 5–2 (Home: 3–1; Away: 2–1)

#	Date	Opponent	Score	Win	Loss	Save	Attendance	Record
1	April 20	@ Cubs	5–0	**Blanton** (1–0)	French	—	18,940	1–0
2	April 22	@ Cubs	4–2	**Brandt** (1–0)	Lee	—	4,078	2–0
3	April 23	Reds	4–3	**Hoyt** (1–0)	Grissom	—	22,000	3–0
4	April 24	Reds	3–2	**Swift** (1–0)	Hallahan	—	13,000	4–0
5	April 27	@ Cardinals	1–3	Weiland	**Blanton** (1–1)	—	2,461	4–1
6	April 29	Cubs	6–5 (13)	**Bowman** (1–0)	Lee	—	7,500	5–1
7	April 30	Cubs	2–7	Parmelee	**Bauers** (0–1)	—	8,300	5–2

May: 18–10 (Home: 5–6; Away: 13–4)

#	Date	Opponent	Score	Win	Loss	Save	Attendance	Record
8	May 1	@ Reds	3–1	**Lucas** (1–0)	Hallahan	—	4,846	6–2
9	May 2	@ Reds	7–2	**Bowman** (2–0)	Grissom	—	17,488	7–2
10	May 4	@ Dodgers	10–3	**Brandt** (2–0)	Henshaw	**Swift** (1)	6,255	8–2
11	May 5	@ Dodgers	5–1	**Blanton** (2–1)	Frankhouse	—	4,362	9–2
12	May 6	@ Dodgers	5–9	Mungo	**Lucas** (1–1)	—	5,847	9–3
13	May 7	@ Phillies	8–3	**Bowman** (3–0)	LaMaster	—	4,000	10–3
14	May 9	@ Bees	6–3	**Brandt** (3–0)	Weir	—	17,102	11–3
15	May 10	@ Bees	4–1	**Swift** (2–0)	Fette	—	1,846	12–3
16	May 11	@ Bees	3–0	**Blanton** (3–1)	MacFayden	—	2,316	13–3
17	May 12	@ Giants	6–5	**Bowman** (4–0)	Smith	**Swift** (2)	12,018	14–3
18	May 13	@ Giants	2–5	Hubbell	**Hoyt** (1–1)	—	8,672	14–4
19	May 14	Cardinals	14–4	**Brown** (1–0)	Dean	—	10,000	15–4
20	May 15	Cardinals	2–4	Harrell	**Swift** (2–1)	Dean	13,000	15–5
21	May 16	Cardinals	2–1	**Bowman** (5–0)	Weiland	—	39,571	16–5
22	May 18	Phillies	2–1	**Blanton** (4–1)	Mulcahy	—	2,500	17–5
23	May 19	Phillies	4–5	Walters	**Brandt** (3–1)	—	2,000	17–6
24	May 20	Phillies	5–2	**Swift** (3–1)	LaMaster	—	2,800	18–6
25	May 21	Bees	3–6	MacFayden	**Bowman** (5–1)	—	3,000	18–7
26	May 22	Bees	5–2	**Lucas** (2–1)	Bush	**Swift** (3)	7,000	19–7
27	May 23	Giants	5–6	Schumacher	**Hoyt** (1–2)	Melton	29,486	19–8
28	May 24	Giants	3–4	Hubbell	**Brandt** (3–2)	Coffman	17,000	19–9
29	May 25	Dodgers	1–2	Mungo	**Swift** (3–2)	—	2,880	19–10
30	May 28	@ Cardinals	10–3	**Lucas** (3–1)	Harrell	**Hoyt** (1)	3,080	20–10
31	May 29	@ Cardinals	9–4	**Blanton** (5–1)	Dean	—	—	21–10
32	May 29	@ Cardinals	1–2	Weiland	**Brandt** (3–3)	—	15,505	21–11
33	May 30	@ Cardinals	7–4	**Swift** (4–2)	Harrell	—	12,495	22–11
34	May 31	@ Reds	3–8	Davis	**Bowman** (5–2)	Grissom	—	22–12
35	May 31	@ Reds	7–5	**Tobin** (1–0)	Moore	**Hoyt** (2)	14,352	23–12

June: 12–15 (Home: 6–6; Away: 6–9)

#	Date	Opponent	Score	Win	Loss	Save	Attendance	Record
36	June 2	@ Bees	2–0	**Blanton** (6–1)	Hutchinson	—	2,636	24–12
37	June 3	@ Bees	0–6	Fette	**Brandt** (3–4)	—	2,139	24–13
38	June 4	@ Bees	1–9	Turner	**Swift** (4–3)	—	3,294	24–14
39	June 5	@ Giants	5–7	Smith	**Bowman** (5–3)	Melton	15,333	24–15
40	June 6	@ Giants	5–9	Schumacher	**Blanton** (6–2)	Hubbell	24,162	24–16
41	June 7	@ Giants	2–5	Gumbert	**Brandt** (3–5)	—	5,446	24–17
42	June 8	@ Phillies	8–1	**Bauers** (1–1)	LaMaster	—	2,000	25–17
43	June 9	@ Phillies	1–8	Passeau	**Tobin** (1–1)	—	1,500	25–18
44	June 10	@ Phillies	4–5	Walters	**Swift** (4–4)	—	6,000	25–19
45	June 12	@ Dodgers	8–3	**Blanton** (7–2)	Henshaw	—	8,137	26–19
46	June 13	@ Dodgers	2–6	Mungo	**Bauers** (1–2)	—	—	26–20
47	June 13	@ Dodgers	1–4	Fitzsimmons	**Swift** (4–5)	—	30,109	26–21
48	June 15	Giants	7–5	**Lucas** (4–1)	Hubbell	—	8,093	27–21
49	June 16	Giants	4–5	Schumacher	**Blanton** (7–3)	—	6,500	27–22
50	June 18	Dodgers	6–4	**Brown** (2–0)	Mungo	—	2,500	28–22
51	June 19	Dodgers	3–4	Fitzsimmons	**Weaver** (0–1)	—	4,211	28–23
52	June 20	Dodgers	4–2	**Bowman** (6–3)	Hamlin	—	—	29–23
53	June 20	Dodgers	2–4	Frankhouse	**Lucas** (4–2)	Mungo	23,222	29–24
54	June 22	Bees	4–1	**Blanton** (8–3)	Turner	—	2,500	30–24
55	June 23	Bees	8–5	**Bauers** (2–2)	MacFayden	—	2,331	31–24
56	June 24	Bees	6–9	Fette	**Swift** (4–6)	—	5,373	31–25
57	June 25	Phillies	5–10	LaMaster	**Bowman** (6–4)	Jorgens	5,183	31–26
58	June 26	Phillies	6–7 (13)	Walters	**Blanton** (8–4)	—	3,054	31–27
59	June 27	Phillies	4–3	**Lucas** (5–2)	Passeau	—	3,541	32–27
60	June 29	@ Reds	2–1	**Bowman** (7–4)	Derringer	—	—	33–27
61	June 29	@ Reds	13–6	**Bauers** (3–2)	Vander Meer	—	3,955	34–27
62	June 30	@ Reds	6–0	**Blanton** (9–4)	Grissom	—	15,568	35–27

July: 12–15 (Home: 7–4; Away: 5–11)

#	Date	Opponent	Score	Win	Loss	Save	Attendance	Record
63	July 2	@ Cubs	7–8	Davis	**Lucas** (5–3)	—	23,998	35–28
64	July 3	@ Cubs	5–10	Carleton	**Bowman** (7–5)	—	11,665	35–29
65	July 4	@ Cubs	5–8	Root	**Blanton** (9–5)	—	—	35–30
66	July 4	@ Cubs	7–6	**Swift** (5–6)	Parmelee	**Bowman** (1)	36,744	36–30
67	July 5	Reds	3–1	**Weaver** (1–1)	Schott	—	—	37–30
68	July 5	Reds	5–1	**Brandt** (4–5)	Derringer	**Brown** (1)	21,999	38–30
69	July 9	Cubs	13–1	**Bowman** (8–5)	Carleton	—	7,416	39–30
70	July 10	Cubs	0–2	French	**Blanton** (9–6)	—	8,000	39–31
71	July 11	Cubs	3–2	**Swift** (6–6)	Lee	—	14,705	40–31
72	July 12	Cardinals	5–6	Johnson	**Bauers** (3–3)	—	6,250	40–32
73	July 14	@ Giants	2–4	Hubbell	**Bowman** (8–6)	—	6,995	40–33
74	July 16	@ Giants	4–3 (11)	**Brown** (3–0)	Melton	—	7,178	41–33
75	July 17	@ Phillies	8–9	Mulcahy	**Brown** (3–1)	—	3,000	41–34
76	July 18	@ Phillies	2–5	Passeau	**Lucas** (5–4)	—	—	41–35
77	July 18	@ Phillies	6–5 (11)	**Swift** (7–6)	Mulcahy	—	8,000	42–35
78	July 19	@ Phillies	6–5	**Weaver** (2–1)	Walters	**Brandt** (1)	1,500	43–35
79	July 20	@ Dodgers	1–2 (10)	Butcher	**Blanton** (9–7)	—	1,926	43–36
80	July 21	@ Dodgers	0–6	Jeffcoat	**Bowman** (8–7)	—	2,283	43–37
81	July 22	@ Dodgers	10–1	**Lucas** (6–4)	Henshaw	—	2,551	44–37
82	July 24	@ Bees	0–9	Turner	**Swift** (7–7)	—	5,236	44–38
83	July 25	@ Bees	2–5	Bush	**Blanton** (9–8)	—	—	44–39
84	July 25	@ Bees	5–7	Fette	**Bowman** (8–8)	Gabler	23,320	44–40
85	July 27	Phillies	4–1	**Lucas** (7–4)	Walters	—	3,807	45–40
86	July 28	Phillies	6–4	**Weaver** (3–1)	Passeau	**Brown** (2)	1,685	46–40
87	July 29	Phillies	7–11	Jorgens	**Swift** (7–8)	Johnson	4,307	46–41
88	July 30	Bees	1–0	**Brandt** (5–5)	Bush	—	4,126	47–41
89	July 31	Bees	7–9	Hutchinson	**Swift** (7–9)	Smith	4,116	47–42

August: 15–16 (Home: 8–7; Away: 7–9)

#	Date	Opponent	Score	Win	Loss	Save	Attendance	Record
90	August 1	Bees	8–4	**Bauers** (4–3)	MacFayden	—	6,214	48–42
91	August 3	Dodgers	5–4	**Weaver** (4–1)	Frankhouse	—	—	49–42
92	August 3	Dodgers	10–4	**Brown** (4–1)	Butcher	**Bauers** (1)	6,588	50–42
93	August 4	Dodgers	7–10	Fitzsimmons	**Brandt** (5–6)	Lindsey	1,594	50–43
94	August 5	Dodgers	6–9	Hoyt	**Blanton** (9–9)	—	3,693	50–44
95	August 6	Giants	3–6	Hubbell	**Lucas** (7–5)	—	6,444	50–45
96	August 8	Giants	2–10	Melton	**Brown** (4–2)	—	—	50–46
97	August 8	Giants	3–0	**Weaver** (5–1)	Gumbert	—	34,000	51–46
98	August 10	@ Cubs	6–5	**Blanton** (10–9)	Shoun	**Brown** (3)	12,516	52–46
99	August 11	@ Cubs	1–5	Bryant	**Lucas** (7–6)	—	11,363	52–47
100	August 12	@ Cubs	16–6	**Bauers** (5–3)	Carleton	—	10,977	53–47
101	August 13	@ Cardinals	1–4	Weiland	**Weaver** (5–2)	—	3,752	53–48
102	August 14	@ Cardinals	6–5	**Weaver** (6–2)	Ryba	**Tobin** (1)	4,998	54–48
103	August 15	@ Cardinals	8–4	**Blanton** (11–9)	Warneke	—	—	55–48
104	August 15	@ Cardinals	4–0	**Bauers** (6–3)	Johnson	—	23,083	56–48
105	August 17	Cubs	4–2	**Brandt** (6–6)	French	**Brown** (4)	6,593	57–48
106	August 18	Cubs	7–6	**Bauers** (7–3)	Shoun	—	5,581	58–48
107	August 19	Cubs	3–7	Davis	**Weaver** (6–3)	—	6,576	58–49
108	August 20	Cardinals	7–4	**Blanton** (12–9)	Johnson	—	6,060	59–49
109	August 21	Cardinals	7–3	**Bauers** (8–3)	Harrell	—	5,714	60–49
110	August 22	Cardinals	0–12	Weiland	**Lucas** (7–7)	—	—	60–50
111	August 22	Cardinals	7–9	Dean	**Brandt** (6–7)	—	36,673	60–51
112	August 24	@ Bees	0–1	Turner	**Blanton** (12–10)	—	2,162	60–52
113	August 25	@ Bees	6–0	**Bauers** (9–3)	Gabler	—	3,507	61–52
114	August 27	@ Giants	1–0	**Brandt** (7–7)	Melton	**Brown** (5)	—	62–52
115	August 27	@ Giants	2–3	Smith	**Swift** (7–10)	—	13,004	62–53
116	August 28	@ Giants	4–9	Coffman	**Weaver** (6–4)	—	—	62–54
117	August 28	@ Giants	1–3	Schumacher	**Bauers** (9–4)	—	42,438	62–55
118	August 29	@ Dodgers	3–5	Hoyt	**Lucas** (7–8)	—	—	62–56
119	August 29	@ Dodgers	3–6	Hamlin	**Tobin** (1–2)	—	12,000	62–57
120	August 31	@ Phillies	0–3	Walters	**Brandt** (7–8)	—	2,500	62–58

September: 20–10 (Home: 13–8; Away: 7–2)

#	Date	Opponent	Score	Win	Loss	Save	Attendance	Record
121	September 1	@ Phillies	3–5	Passeau	**Weaver** (6–5)	—	3,000	62–59
122	September 2	@ Phillies	11–8	**Brown** (5–2)	LaMaster	**Brandt** (2)	3,000	63–59
123	September 5	@ Cubs	7–0	**Lucas** (8–8)	French	—	—	64–59
124	September 5	@ Cubs	4–1	**Brandt** (8–8)	Bryant	**Brown** (6)	34,091	65–59
125	September 6	@ Cardinals	1–4	Weiland	**Blanton** (12–11)	—	—	65–60
126	September 6	@ Cardinals	5–4	**Bauers** (10–4)	Johnson	—	16,746	66–60
127	September 8	Reds	7–6 (10)	**Weaver** (7–5)	Derringer	—	—	67–60
128	September 8	Reds	8–2	**Tobin** (2–2)	Mooty	—	3,508	68–60
129	September 9	Reds	1–0	**Brandt** (9–8)	Schott	—	1,986	69–60
130	September 10	Reds	7–6	**Brown** (6–2)	Hallahan	—	1,169	70–60
131	September 11	Cubs	4–5	Davis	**Bauers** (10–5)	—	3,100	70–61
132	September 12	Cubs	0–5	French	**Lucas** (8–9)	—	—	70–62
133	September 12	Cubs	4–2	**Tobin** (3–2)	Lee	—	25,000	71–62
134	September 14	Giants	2–12	Hubbell	**Brandt** (9–9)	—	—	71–63
135	September 14	Giants	6–2	**Blanton** (13–11)	Smith	—	10,000	72–63
136	September 15	Giants	2–7	Schumacher	**Bauers** (10–6)	—	1,621	72–64
137	September 16	Giants	0–3	Melton	**Tobin** (3–3)	—	3,750	72–65
138	September 17	Dodgers	10–4	**Brandt** (10–9)	Hamlin	—	927	73–65
139	September 18	Dodgers	3–2	**Blanton** (14–11)	Fitzsimmons	—	1,598	74–65
140	September 19	Phillies	1–8	Mulcahy	**Lucas** (8–10)	—	—	74–66
141	September 19	Phillies	5–1	**Bauers** (11–6)	Kelleher	—	6,137	75–66
142	September 21	Bees	9–2	**Tobin** (4–3)	Fette	—	1,066	76–66
143	September 22	Bees	2–3 (10)	Shoffner	**Brandt** (10–10)	—	1,103	76–67
144	September 23	Bees	1–2	Turner	**Blanton** (14–12)	—	1,031	76–68
145	September 24	@ Reds	8–2	**Bauers** (12–6)	Schott	—	301	77–68
146	September 26	@ Reds	5–4	**Tobin** (5–3)	Schott	—	—	78–68
147	September 26	@ Reds	2–1	**Swift** (8–10)	Grissom	—	3,058	79–68
148	September 28	Cardinals	6–2	**Brandt** (11–10)	Johnson	—	1,068	80–68
149	September 29	Cardinals	7–5	**Weaver** (8–5)	Warneke	**Brown** (7)	1,226	81–68
150	September 30	Cardinals	4–3	**Bauers** (13–6)	Weiland	—	1,477	82–68

October: 4–0 (Home: 4–0; Away: 0–0)

#	Date	Opponent	Score	Win	Loss	Save	Attendance	Record
151	October 1	Reds	6–3	**Tobin** (6–3)	Hollingsworth	—	852	83–68
152	October 2	Reds	4–3 (11)	**Swift** (9–10)	Vander Meer	—	1,020	84–68
153	October 3	Reds	4–3	**Heintzelman** (1–0)	Kleinhans	—	—	85–68
154	October 3	Reds	4–0 (7)	**Brown** (7–2)	Davis	—	2,064	86–68

Legend: = Win = Loss
Bold = Pirates team member

=== Roster ===
1937 Pittsburgh Pirates
**Roster**
**Pitchers**: 51 Russ Bauers; 46 Cy Blanton; 27 Joe Bowman; 49 Ed Brandt; 47 Mace Brown; 44 Ken Heintzelman; 48 Waite Hoyt; 40 Red Lucas; 45 Bill Swift; 50 Jim Tobin; 43 Jim Weaver	**Catchers**: 48 Ray Berres; 31 Tom Padden; 30 Al Todd; **Infielders**: 25 Bill Brubaker; 22 Lee Handley; 32 Bill Schuster; 24 Gus Suhr; 20 Pie Traynor; 21 Arky Vaughan; 26 Pep Young	**Outfielders**: 15 Johnny Dickshot; 16 Woody Jensen; 14 Fred Schulte; 10 Lloyd Waner; 11 Paul Waner	**Manager**: 20 Pie Traynor; **Coaches**: 33 Jewel Ens; 34 Johnny Gooch; 36 Honus Wagner

== Player stats ==
=== Batting ===
==== Starters by position ====
Note: Pos = Position; G = Games played; AB = At bats; H = Hits; Avg. = Batting average; HR = Home runs; RBI = Runs batted in

Pos	Player	G	AB	H	Avg.	HR	RBI
C	Al Todd	133	514	158	.307	8	86
1B	Gus Suhr	151	575	160	.278	5	97
2B	Lee Handley	127	480	120	.250	3	37
SS	Arky Vaughn	126	469	151	.322	5	72
3B	Bill Brubaker	120	413	105	.254	6	48
OF	Lloyd Waner	129	537	177	.330	1	45
OF	Paul Waner	154	619	219	.354	2	74
OF	Woody Jensen	124	509	142	.279	5	45

==== Other batters ====
Note: G = Games played; AB = At bats; H = Hits; Avg. = Batting average; HR = Home runs; RBI = Runs batted in

Player	G	AB	H	Avg.	HR	RBI
Pep Young	113	408	106	.260	9	54
Johnny Dickshot	82	264	67	.254	3	33
Tom Padden	35	98	28	.286	0	8
Fred Schulte	29	20	2	.100	0	3
Pie Traynor	5	12	2	.167	0	0
Bill Schuster	3	6	3	.500	0	1
Ray Berres	2	6	1	.167	0	0

=== Pitching ===
==== Starting pitchers ====
Note: G = Games pitched; IP = Innings pitched; W = Wins; L = Losses; ERA = Earned run average; SO = Strikeouts

Player	G	IP	W	L	ERA	SO
Cy Blanton	36	242.2	14	12	3.30	143
Ed Brandt	33	176.1	11	10	3.11	74
Red Lucas	20	126.1	8	10	4.27	20
Ken Heintzelman	1	9.0	1	0	2.00	4

==== Other pitchers ====
Note: G = Games pitched; IP = Innings pitched; W = Wins; L = Losses; ERA = Earned run average; SO = Strikeouts

Player	G	IP	W	L	ERA	SO
Russ Bauers	34	187.2	13	6	2.88	118
Bill Swift	36	164.0	9	10	3.95	84
Joe Bowman	30	128.0	8	8	4.57	38
Jim Weaver	32	109.2	8	5	3.20	44
Jim Tobin	20	87.0	6	3	3.00	37

==== Relief pitchers ====
Note: G = Games pitched; W = Wins; L = Losses; SV = Saves; ERA = Earned run average; SO = Strikeouts

Player	G	W	L	SV	ERA	SO
Mace Brown	50	7	2	7	4.18	60
Waite Hoyt	11	1	2	2	4.50	21

== Farm system ==
Level	Team	League	Manager
AA	Montreal Royals	International League	Walter "Rabbit" Maranville
B	Savannah Indians	Sally League	Bill Steinecke and Chick Autry
C	Hutchinson Larks	Western Association	Dick Goldberg, Dick Klinger and Hugh McMullen
D	Mt. Airy Reds	Bi-State League	Frank Packard and Walt Novak
D	Paducah Indians	KITTY League	Hugh McMullen, Ervin Brame, Lee Keller, Ralph Bishop, George Block and Pete Mondino

LEAGUE CHAMPIONS: Savannah
