= 1937 Brooklyn Dodgers season =

1937 Brooklyn Dodgers
- League: National League
- Ballpark: Ebbets Field
- City: Brooklyn, New York
- Record: 62–91 (.405)
- League place: 6th
- Owners: Stephen McKeever, Brooklyn Trust Company
- President: Stephen McKeever
- Managers: Burleigh Grimes

Former Dodgers pitcher Burleigh Grimes was brought in to manage the 1937 Brooklyn Dodgers, but the team continued to struggle, finishing in sixth place.

== Offseason ==
- November 19, 1936: Tony Malinosky was purchased by the Dodgers from the Pittsburgh Pirates.
- December 4, 1936: Ed Brandt was traded by the Dodgers to the Pittsburgh Pirates for Cookie Lavagetto and Ralph Birkofer.
- December 5, 1936: Lonny Frey was traded by the Dodgers to the Chicago Cubs for Roy Henshaw and Woody English.

== Regular season ==
=== Season standings ===
National League
Team	W	L	Pct.	GB	Home	Road
New York Giants	95	57	.625	—	50‍–‍25	45‍–‍32
Chicago Cubs	93	61	.604	3	46‍–‍32	47‍–‍29
Pittsburgh Pirates	86	68	.558	10	46‍–‍32	40‍–‍36
St. Louis Cardinals	81	73	.526	15	45‍–‍33	36‍–‍40
Boston Bees	79	73	.520	16	43‍–‍33	36‍–‍40
Brooklyn Dodgers	62	91	.405	33½	36‍–‍39	26‍–‍52
Philadelphia Phillies	61	92	.399	34½	29‍–‍45	32‍–‍47
Cincinnati Reds	56	98	.364	40	28‍–‍51	28‍–‍47

=== Record vs. opponents ===
1937 National League record Sources:
Team	BSN	BRO	CHC	CIN	NYG	PHI	PIT	STL
Boston	—	15–7	9–13	11–11	10–10	14–8	11–11	9–13
Brooklyn	7–15	—	8–14	12–10–1	6–16	10–11	12–10	7–15–1
Chicago	13–9	14–8	—	14–8	12–10	14–8	9–13	17–5
Cincinnati	11–11	10–12–1	8–14	—	8–14	11–11	1–21	7–15
New York	10–10	16–6	10–12	14–8	—	15–7	16–6	14–8
Philadelphia	8–14	11–10	8–14	11–11	7–15	—	11–11	5–17–2
Pittsburgh	11–11	10–12	13–9	21–1	6–16	11–11	—	14–8
St. Louis	13–9	15–7–1	5–17	15–7	8–14	17–5–2	8–14	—

=== Notable transactions ===
- May 2, 1937: Roy Spencer was purchased by the Dodgers from the New York Giants.
- May 24, 1937: Randy Moore was traded by the Dodgers to the St. Louis Cardinals for Paul Chervinko.
- June 11, 1937: Tom Baker was traded by the Dodgers to the New York Giants for Freddie Fitzsimmons.
- June 12, 1937: Waite Hoyt was purchased by the Dodgers from the Pittsburgh Pirates.
- July 11, 1937: Ralph Birkofer was traded by the Dodgers to the Detroit Tigers for Lindsay Brown and cash.
- July 23, 1937: Frank Skaff and cash were traded by the Dodgers to the Washington Senators for Jake Daniel.
- August 9, 1937: Ben Cantwell was purchased by the Dodgers from the New York Giants.
- September 10, 1937: Tot Pressnell was purchased by the Dodgers from the Cleveland Indians.
- September 10, 1937: Ben Geraghty and Jack Radtke were traded by the Dodgers to the Washington Senators for Fred Chapman.
- October 4, 1937: Johnny Cooney, Jim Bucher, Joe Stripp and Roy Henshaw were traded by the Dodgers to the St. Louis Cardinals for Leo Durocher.

=== Roster ===
1937 Brooklyn Dodgers
Roster
Pitchers: 20 Tom Baker; 19 Ralph Birkofer; 15 Max Butcher; 27 Ben Cantwell; 17 Watty Clark; 18 Harry Eisenstat; 10 Freddie Fitzsimmons; 11 Fred Frankhouse; 12 Luke Hamlin; 22 Roy Henshaw; 34 Waite Hoyt; 23 George Jeffcoat; 19 Jim Lindsey; -- Buck Marrow; 16 Van Mungo; -- Jim Peterson	Catchers: 8 Paul Chervinko; 34 Elmer Klumpp; 10 Randy Moore; 9 Babe Phelps; 14 Roy Spencer; Infielders: 7 Lindsay Brown; 2 Jim Bucher; 24 Jake Daniel; 1 Woody English; -- George Fallon; 6 Buddy Hassett; 7 Johnny Hudson; 5 Cookie Lavagetto; 4 Tony Malinosky; 27 Eddie Morgan; -- Nick Polly; 3 Joe Stripp	Outfielders: 30 Gibby Brack; -- George Cisar; 25 Johnny Cooney; 8 Sid Gautreaux; -- Bert Haas; 26 Heinie Manush; -- Art Parks; -- Goody Rosen; 28 Eddie Wilson; 29 Tom Winsett	Manager: 33 Burleigh Grimes; Coaches: 31 Andy High

== Player stats ==
=== Batting ===
==== Starters by position ====
Note: Pos = Position; G = Games played; AB = At bats; H = Hits; Avg. = Batting average; HR = Home runs; RBI = Runs batted in

Pos	Player	G	AB	H	Avg.	HR	RBI
C	Babe Phelps	121	409	128	.313	7	58
1B	Buddy Hassett	137	556	169	.304	1	53
2B	Cookie Lavagetto	149	503	142	.282	8	70
3B	Joe Stripp	90	300	73	.243	1	26
SS	Woody English	129	378	90	.238	1	42
OF	Heinie Manush	132	466	155	.333	4	73
OF	Johnny Cooney	120	430	126	.293	0	37
OF	Gibby Brack	112	372	102	.274	5	38

==== Other batters ====
Note: G = Games played; AB = At bats; H = Hits; Avg. = Batting average; HR = Home runs; RBI = Runs batted in

Player	G	AB	H	Avg.	HR	RBI
Jim Bucher	125	380	96	.253	4	37
Tom Winsett	118	350	83	.237	5	42
Roy Spencer	51	117	24	.205	0	4
Lindsay Brown	48	115	31	.270	0	6
Tony Malinosky	35	79	18	.228	0	3
Goody Rosen	22	77	24	.312	0	6
Eddie Wilson	36	54	12	.222	1	8
Paul Chervinko	30	48	7	.146	0	2
Eddie Morgan	31	48	9	.188	0	5
George Cisar	20	29	6	.207	0	4
Jake Daniel	12	27	5	.185	0	3
Johnny Hudson	13	27	5	.185	0	2
Bert Haas	16	25	10	.400	0	2
Randy Moore	13	22	3	.136	0	2
Nick Polly	10	18	4	.222	0	2
Art Parks	7	16	5	.313	0	0
Elmer Klumpp	5	11	1	.091	0	2
Sid Gautreaux	11	10	1	.100	0	2
George Fallon	4	8	2	.250	0	0

=== Pitching ===
==== Starting pitchers ====
Note: G = Games pitched; IP = Innings pitched; W = Wins; L = Losses; ERA = Earned run average; SO = Strikeouts

Player	G	IP	W	L	ERA	SO
Fred Frankhouse	33	179.1	10	13	4.27	64
Waite Hoyt	27	167.0	7	7	3.23	44
Van Mungo	25	161.0	9	11	2.91	122
Freddie Fitzsimmons	13	90.2	4	8	4.27	29

==== Other pitchers ====
Note: G = Games pitched; IP = Innings pitched; W = Wins; L = Losses; ERA = Earned run average; SO = Strikeouts

Player	G	IP	W	L	ERA	SO
Max Butcher	39	191.2	11	15	4.27	57
Luke Hamlin	39	185.2	11	13	3.59	93
Roy Henshaw	42	156.1	5	12	5.07	98
Harry Eisenstat	13	47.2	3	3	3.97	12
Buck Marrow	6	16.1	1	2	6.61	2

==== Relief pitchers ====
Note: G = Games pitched; W = Wins; L = Losses; SV = Saves; ERA = Earned run average; SO = Strikeouts

Player	G	W	L	SV	ERA	SO
George Jeffcoat	21	1	3	0	5.13	29
Jim Lindsey	20	0	1	2	3.52	15
Ben Cantwell	13	0	0	0	4.61	12
Ralph Birkofer	11	0	2	0	6.67	9
Tom Baker	7	0	1	0	8.64	2
Jim Peterson	3	0	0	0	7.94	4
Watty Clark	2	0	0	0	7.71	0
Tom Winsett	1	0	0	0	18.00	0

== Awards and honors ==
- 1937 Major League Baseball All-Star Game
  - Van Mungo reserve

== Farm System ==
Level	Team	League	Manager
A1	Knoxville Smokies	Southern Association	Neil Caldwell
A	Elmira Pioneers	Eastern League	Bruno Betzel
A	Davenport Blue Sox	Western League	John Fitzpatrick
B	Clinton Owls	Illinois–Indiana–Iowa League	Clyde Sukeforth
C	Greenwood Dodgers	Cotton States League	Elmer Yoter
D	Pocomoke City Red Sox	Eastern Shore League	Vic Keen
D	Cordele Reds	Georgia–Florida League	Ivy Griffin
D	Americus Cardinals	Georgia–Florida League	Dixie Parker; Bill Porter; Guy Lacy
D	Beatrice Blues	Nebraska State League	Leon Riley
D	Greensburg Green Sox	Pennsylvania State Association	Wilbur Cooper

LEAGUE CHAMPIONS: Elmira
