= Larry Crawford (baseball) =

American baseball player (1914-1994)

- Pitcher
- Born: April 27, 1914; Swissvale, Pennsylvania, U.S.
- Died: December 20, 1994 (aged 80); Hanover, Pennsylvania, U.S.
- Batted: Left Threw: Left

MLB debut
- July 21, 1937, for the Philadelphia Phillies

Last MLB appearance
- August 20, 1937, for the Philadelphia Phillies

MLB statistics
- Win–loss record: 0–0
- Earned run average: 15.00
- Strikeouts: 2
- Stats at Baseball Reference

Teams
- Philadelphia Phillies (1937)

Charles Lowrie "Larry" Crawford (April 27, 1914 – December 20, 1994) was an American Major League Baseball pitcher who played for the Philadelphia Phillies in 1937. In his brief MLB career, 1 month, he pitched a total of 6 innings across 6 games, surrendering 10 runs (all earned, 15.00 ERA), striking out 2 while walking 1.

Crawford attended Princeton University and graduated with the undergraduate class of 1937, majoring in geology.
