= Wayne LaMaster =

American baseball player

- Pitcher
- Born: February 13, 1907; Speed, Indiana, U.S.
- Died: August 4, 1989 (aged 82); New Albany, Indiana, U.S.
- Batted: Left Threw: Left

MLB debut
- April 19, 1937, for the Philadelphia Phillies

Last MLB appearance
- August 29, 1938, for the Brooklyn Dodgers

MLB statistics
- Win–loss record: 19–27
- Earned run average: 5.82
- Strikeouts: 173
- Stats at Baseball Reference

Teams
- Philadelphia Phillies (1937–1938); Brooklyn Dodgers (1938)

Noble Wayne LaMaster (February 13, 1907 – August 4, 1989) was an American professional baseball player who pitched in the Major Leagues for the Philadelphia Phillies and Brooklyn Dodgers during the 1937–1938 baseball seasons. He was purchased by the Dodgers on August 8, 1938.

Born in Speed, Indiana, LaMaster died in New Albany, Indiana, on August 4, 1989, aged 82.
