= George Scharein =

American baseball player (1914-1981)

- Shortstop
- Born: November 21, 1914; Decatur, Illinois, U.S.
- Died: December 23, 1981 (aged 67); Decatur, Illinois, U.S.
- Batted: Right Threw: Right

MLB debut
- April 19, 1937, for the Philadelphia Phillies

Last MLB appearance
- April 28, 1940, for the Philadelphia Phillies

MLB statistics
- Batting average: .240
- Home runs: 2
- Runs batted in: 119
- Stats at Baseball Reference

Teams
- Philadelphia Phillies (1937–1940)

George Albert Scharein (November 21, 1914 – December 23, 1981) was an American shortstop in Major League Baseball. He played for the Philadelphia Phillies.
