= Bob Weiland =

American baseball player (1905–1988)

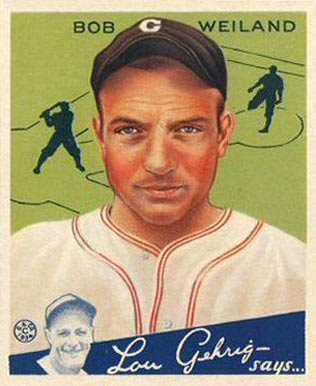
- Pitcher
- Born: December 14, 1905; Chicago, Illinois, U.S.
- Died: November 9, 1988 (aged 82); Chicago, Illinois, U.S.
- Batted: Left Threw: Left

MLB debut
- September 30, 1928, for the Chicago White Sox

Last MLB appearance
- April 26, 1940, for the St. Louis Cardinals

MLB statistics
- Win–loss record: 62–94
- Earned run average: 4.24
- Strikeouts: 614
- Stats at Baseball Reference

Teams
- Chicago White Sox (1928–1931); Boston Red Sox (1932–1934); Cleveland Indians (1934); St. Louis Browns (1935); St. Louis Cardinals (1937–1940)

Robert George Weiland (December 14, 1905 – November 9, 1988) was a professional baseball pitcher in the Major Leagues from 1928 to 1940. He played for the Chicago White Sox, Boston Red Sox, Cleveland Indians, St. Louis Browns, and St. Louis Cardinals.

== Biography ==
Weiland was born on December 14, 1905, on Chicago's South Side to Christ and Mathilda Weiland and he also had an older sister. In his professional career, he was listed at 6 ft 4 in (1.93 m) tall and weighing 215 pounds (98 kg). He attended Lowell School for the first eight years and then went to Lane Tech High School for the next four years in Chicago.

Unfortunately, he played for two unsuccessful teams in the American League for the first six and a half years in the majors, pitching for the White Sox and Red Sox from 1928 to 1934 and putting up a combined record of 20–50. Then he moved from to the Indians in the mid of 1934, it still took some time for him and then he was 1–5 for the balance of the year.

There may not have been any better chances of finishing with a lot of money with the Red Sox due to the team finishing in eighth again in 1932. Weiland's ERA of 4.51 was distinctly better than the team's own 5.02. Weiland began to have issues with throwing the ball over the plate, walking 97 while only striking out 63 and putting up a walks and hits per inning pitched of 1.676.

Weiland improved walks and hits per inning to 1.373 and the team then finished seventh. He started with a 1–5 record for the Red Sox in 1934, but then was bought by the Cleveland Indians. His pitching improved, but also put up a 1–5 record for Cleveland causing it to be 2–10 on the season. Then in November for ten grand, he was sent to the St. Louis Browns where he did not pitch that much either, spending most of his time in the minor leagues.

Weiland's was then sent to the St. Louis Cardinals in 1937 and improved again, going 15–14 and 16–11. This could be due because he was on a much better team, but his ERA decreased a large amount, too.

Weiland's final major league game came on April 26, 1940. He played for five teams in total: Chicago White Sox, Boston Red Sox, Cleveland Indians, St. Louis Browns, and the St. Louis Cardinals. He died of a stroke and congestive heart failure on November 9, 1988, in Chicago.
