= Hal Kelleher =

American baseball player (1914-1989)

- Pitcher
- Born: June 24, 1914; Philadelphia, Pennsylvania, U.S.
- Died: August 27, 1989 (aged 75); Cape May Court House, New Jersey, U.S.
- Batted: Right Threw: Right

MLB debut
- September 17, 1935, for the Philadelphia Phillies

Last appearance
- May 5, 1938, for the Philadelphia Phillies

MLB statistics
- Win–loss record: 4–9
- Earned run average: 5.95
- Strikeouts: 49
- Stats at Baseball Reference

Teams
- Philadelphia Phillies (1935–1938)

Harold Joseph Kelleher (June 24, 1914 – August 27, 1989) was a Major League Baseball player who played four seasons with the Philadelphia Phillies from 1935 to 1938 in the National League.

== Minor League career ==
Kelleher started his Minor League baseball career with the Hazelton Mountaineers in the New York–Pennsylvania League in 1934. After a 13 win season in 1935, Kelleher was promoted to the Philadelphia Phillies late in the season.

== Major League Baseball career ==
On September 17, 1935, in his first Major League game, Kelleher pitched a 1–0 shutout against the Cincinnati Reds. Kelleher won his first two decisions that season. He was also the sixth youngest player in the National League that season. In 1936, Kelleher pitched 14 games, starting four. He had a 0–5 win–loss record with a 5.32 earned run average. A low point of the season was when he gave up five runs during the fifth inning against the New York Giants on May 23.

Kelleher pitched a career high 27 games in 1937, winning 2 games and losing 4 in 58 innings, but his earned run average was considered a bad 6.63. That season he led the league in hit by pitch, hitting seven batters. His last career victory was a 9–5 victory against the St. Louis Cardinals on August 26, 1937, in a relief appearance. He pitched 2 1/3 innings, beating future Hall of Famer Dizzy Dean in the process, who left the game with a "sore arm". After having an 18.41 earned run average in six games during the 1938 season, Kelleher pitched his last game on May 5. In that final game, he pitched 1 inning surrendering 12 runs, all earned, in the Phillies' 2–21 loss.

His career record was 4–9 with a 5.95 earned run average in 50 career games. He died in Cape May Court House, New Jersey, at the age of 75.
