= Howie Gorman =

American baseball player (1913–1984)

- Outfielder
- Born: May 14, 1913; Pittsburgh, Pennsylvania, U.S.
- Died: April 29, 1984 (aged 70); Harrisburg, Pennsylvania, U.S.
- Batted: Left Threw: Left

MLB debut
- August 7, 1937, for the Philadelphia Phillies

Last MLB appearance
- April 26, 1938, for the Philadelphia Phillies

MLB statistics
- Batting average: .200
- Home runs: 0
- Runs batted in: 1
- Stats at Baseball Reference

Teams
- Philadelphia Phillies (1937–1938)

Howard Paul "Lefty" Gorman (May 14, 1913 – April 29, 1984) was an American professional baseball player who appeared in 14 major-league games as an outfielder and pinch hitter over parts of two seasons (1937–1938) with the Philadelphia Phillies. The Pittsburgh native was listed as 6 feet 2 inches (1.88 m) tall and 160 pounds (73 kg).

For his career, he compiled a .200 batting average in 20 at-bats, with one run batted in.

He died in Harrisburg, Pennsylvania at the age of 70.
