= Frank Gabler =

American baseball player (1911–1967)

- Pitcher
- Born: November 6, 1911; Highland, California, U.S.
- Died: November 1, 1967 (aged 55); Long Beach, California, U.S.
- Batted: Right Threw: Right

MLB debut
- April 19, 1935, for the New York Giants

Last MLB appearance
- September 29, 1938, for the Chicago White Sox

MLB statistics
- Win–loss record: 16–23
- Earned run average: 5.26
- Strikeouts: 109
- Stats at Baseball Reference

Teams
- New York Giants (1935–1937); Boston Bees (1937–1938); Chicago White Sox (1938)

Frank Harold Gabler (November 6, 1911 – November 1, 1967) was an American right-handed Major League Baseball pitcher who played for the New York Giants (1935–37), Boston Bees (1937–38) and Chicago White Sox (1938). He was nicknamed the Great Gabbo.

Gabler made his major league debut on April 19, 1935, with the Giants. In his rookie season, he went 2–1 with a 5.70 ERA in 26 appearances (one start). The following season, Gabler went 9–8 with a 3.12 ERA in 43 games (14 starts) for the Giants. He began 1937 with the New York team, however he was traded to the Bees with cash for Wally Berger on June 15. In 25 games in 1938, Gabler went 4–7 with a 5.61 ERA. Gabler began the 1938 season with the Bees, appeared in one game for them and was then purchased by the White Sox on May 2. He appeared in 19 games (seven starts) and went 1–7 with a 9.43 ERA. On September 29, 1938, he appeared in his final big league game. Overall, he went 16–23 with a 5.26 ERA in 113 games in his four-year big league career.

Gabler appeared in one World Series – in 1936. He made two relief appearances against the New York Yankees and posted a 7.20 ERA.

Gabler played in the minor leagues as well (1932–1934, 1939–1942, 1946 and 1949–1952). He went 59–68 in 313 games over a 12-year minor league career. He managed the Idaho Falls Russets for part of the 1949 season, the Yuma Panthers for part of the 1950 season and the El Centro Imps for part of the 1952 season. He also served as a scout and minor league pitching instructor (and umpired in the Class C California League) after his playing career.

He died from a heart attack at age 55 in Long Beach, California, on November 1, 1967, five days shy of his birthday.
