= Slick Castleman =

American baseball player

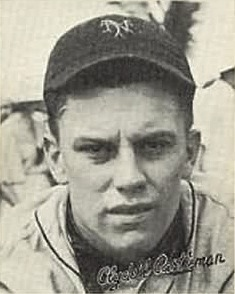
- Pitcher
- Born: September 8, 1913; Donelson, Tennessee, U.S.
- Died: March 2, 1998 (aged 84); Nashville, Tennessee, U.S.
- Batted: Right Threw: Right

MLB debut
- May 9, 1934, for the New York Giants

Last MLB appearance
- July 4, 1939, for the New York Giants

MLB statistics
- Win–loss record: 36–26
- Earned run average: 4.25
- Strikeouts: 225
- Stats at Baseball Reference

Teams
- New York Giants (1934–1939)

Clydell Castleman (September 8, 1913 – March 2, 1998) was an American pitcher in Major League Baseball who played from 1934 through 1939 for the New York Giants, including the National League Champion team that lost to the New York Yankees in six games in the 1936 World Series.
