= Bill Lee (right-handed pitcher) =

American baseball player (1909–1977)

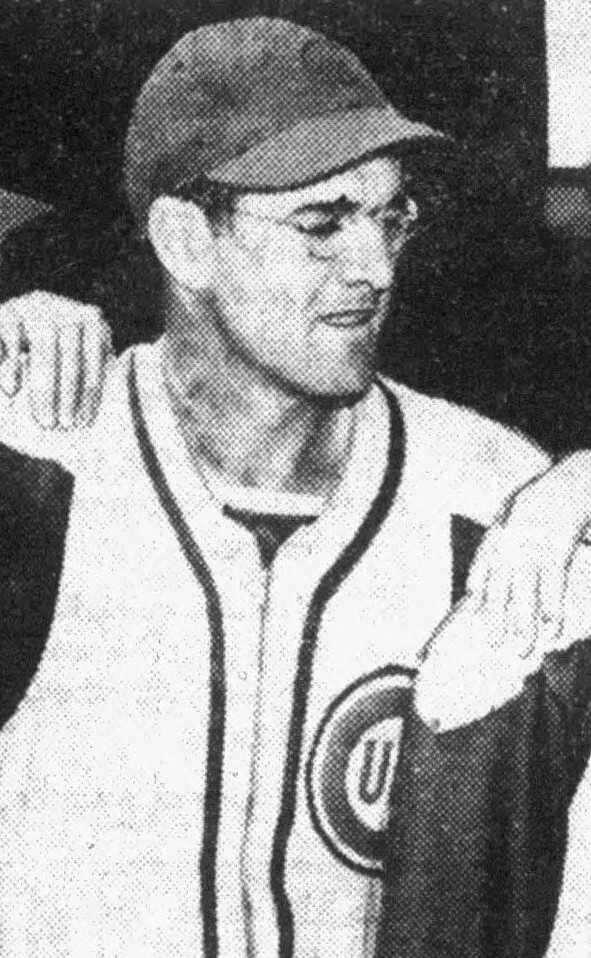
- Lee in 1941
- Pitcher
- Born: October 21, 1909; Plaquemine, Louisiana, U.S.
- Died: June 15, 1977 (aged 67); Plaquemine, Louisiana, U.S.
- Batted: Right Threw: Right

MLB debut
- April 29, 1934, for the Chicago Cubs

Last MLB appearance
- June 29, 1947, for the Chicago Cubs

MLB statistics
- Win–loss record: 169–157
- Earned run average: 3.54
- Strikeouts: 998
- Stats at Baseball Reference

Teams
- Chicago Cubs (1934–1943); Philadelphia Phillies (1943–1945); Boston Braves (1945–1946); Chicago Cubs (1947)

Career highlights and awards
- 2× All-Star (1938, 1939); NL wins leader (1938); NL ERA leader (1938)

William Crutcher "Big Bill" Lee (October 21, 1909 – June 15, 1977) was an American Major League Baseball pitcher. He played professionally for the Chicago Cubs, Philadelphia Phillies, and Boston Braves during the 1930s and 1940s.

== Early life ==
Lee was born in Plaquemine, Louisiana, and played college baseball as a freshman for Louisiana State University. He was originally a top prospect in the St. Louis Cardinals organization.

== Pro career ==
1939 card of Lee for Chicago Cubs

In August 1933, Cardinals general manager Branch Rickey called his counterpart with the Cubs, William Veeck, Sr. and offered him two pitchers—Lee and Clarence Heise. According to Bill Veeck, one of Rickey's favorite tricks was to offer another team two players and trust that the other team would take the wrong one. In the case of Lee and Heise, Rickey knew that all but one Cubs pitcher was right-handed, and expected the Cubs to take Heise, a left-hander. However, on the advice of chief scout Jack Doyle, the Cubs took Lee. As it turned out, Heise would make only one relief appearance in 1934, and was never heard from again. It was one of the few times where Rickey, who was legendary for fleecing National League teams, ended up getting fleeced himself.

Lee spent 10 full seasons with the Cubs, as well as a pair of cameo appearances in 1947. He made his major league debut on April 29, 1934, with the Cubs. He saved Game 5 of the 1935 World Series at Wrigley Field, with his team on the verge of elimination, and his best year was in 1938 when he helped lead the Cubs to another World Series with a league-leading 22 wins and a 2.66 ERA. He was on the National League All-Star Team twice when he played for the Cubs.

Lee played for the Phillies from 1943–1945 and for the Braves from 1945–1946. Lee developed eye problems which made it difficult for him to see the catcher's signs. Eyeglasses helped little, and he retired in 1947 while playing for the Cubs.

Lee's career marks were 169 wins, 157 losses and a 3.54 ERA. His 139 wins with the Cubs are still the ninth-most in franchise history.

== Life after baseball ==
After retiring, Lee returned to Plaquemine, Louisiana, and had eye surgery for his detached retinas. He eventually lost sight in one eye Lee suffered a heart attack in 1976 while visiting in Texas and died on June 15, 1977, and is interred in Saint John Cemetery in Plaquemine.

== Awards and honors ==
Lee was inducted into the Louisiana Sports Hall of Fame in 1962.
