= Jim Turner (baseball) =

American baseball player (1903–1998)

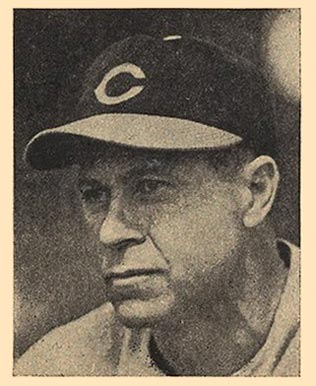
- Pitcher
- Born: August 6, 1903; Antioch, Tennessee, U.S.
- Died: November 29, 1998 (aged 95); Nashville, Tennessee, U.S.
- Batted: Left Threw: Right

MLB debut
- April 30, 1937, for the Boston Bees

Last MLB appearance
- September 13, 1945, for the New York Yankees

MLB statistics
- Win–loss record: 69–60
- Earned run average: 3.22
- Strikeouts: 329
- Stats at Baseball Reference

Teams
- As player: Boston Bees (1937–1939); Cincinnati Reds (1940–1942); New York Yankees (1942–1945); As coach: New York Yankees (1949–1959); Cincinnati Reds (1961–1965); New York Yankees (1966–1973)

Career highlights and awards
- All-Star (1938); 8× World Series champion (1940, 1949–1953, 1956, 1958); NL ERA leader (1937)

James Riley Turner (August 6, 1903 – November 29, 1998) was an American pitcher and coach in Major League Baseball. As a member of the Cincinnati Reds and New York Yankees, he was a member of nine World Series Championship teams between 1940 and 1959, two as a player and seven as a coach. Most notably, he was pitching coach for the Yankees under Casey Stengel from 1949 to 1959, during which time they won seven titles. Apart from his baseball career, Turner was a lifelong resident of Nashville, Tennessee.

== Career ==
From 1937 through 1945, he played for the Boston Bees (1937–39), Cincinnati Reds (1940–42) and New York Yankees (1942–45). Turner's Major League career got off to a late start, as he did not reach the big leagues until he was 33 years old, after 14 seasons of minor league ball. He led the National League in earned run average and won 20 games in 1937 as a rookie with Boston. He surrendered a league-high 21 home runs in 1938. Because he worked for his family's dairy farm in the offseason in Antioch, Tennessee, he was known as "Milkman Jim" to his fans.

For his career, Turner compiled a 69–60 record in 231 games, with a 3.22 earned run average and 329 strikeouts. He was a member of two World Series championship teams, the 1940 Reds and the 1943 Yankees, as well as the 1942 Yankees team that won the American League pennant. In two postseason appearances, Turner was 0–1 with a 6.43 ERA and 4 strikeouts in 7 innings pitched.

Turner was a better than average hitting pitcher, posting a .218 batting average (87-for-399) with 32 runs, one home run and 22 RBI.

After his pitching career ended, Turner served the Yankees (1949–59; 1966–73) and Reds (1961–65) as their pitching coach, working for ten pennant-winning clubs over that 24-year span. He also managed the Beaumont Exporters (1946), Portland Beavers (1947–48) and Nashville Volunteers (1960).

Turner was criticized by Jim Bouton in his book, Ball Four. Bouton claimed Turner (his pitching coach with the Yankees from 1966 to 1968) was a front-runner, who only wanted to be associated with successful pitchers.

== See also ==
- List of Major League Baseball annual saves leaders

Sporting positions
| Preceded by n/a Cot Deal | New York Yankees Pitching Coach; 1949–1959; 1966–1973 | Succeeded by Eddie Lopat; Whitey Ford |
| Preceded by Cot Deal | Cincinnati Reds Pitching Coach; 1961–1965 | Succeeded by Mel Harder |
