= 1937 Major League Baseball season =

1937 MLB season
- League: American League (AL); National League (NL)
- Sport: Baseball
- Duration: Regular season: April 9 – October 3, 1937; World Series: October 6–10, 1937
- Games: 154
- Teams: 16 (8 per league)

Regular season
- Season MVP: AL: Charlie Gehringer (DET); NL: Joe Medwick (STL)
- AL champions: New York Yankees
- AL runners-up: Detroit Tigers
- NL champions: New York Giants
- NL runners-up: Chicago Cubs

World Series
- Champions: New York Yankees
- Runners-up: New York Giants

MLB seasons
- ← 1936 1938 →

Locations of teams for the 1934–1939 American League seasons
American League
Locations of teams for the 1936–1937 National League seasons
National League

The 1937 major league baseball season began on April 19, 1937. The regular season ended on October 3, with the New York Giants and New York Yankees as the regular season champions of the National League and American League, respectively. The postseason began with Game 1 of the 34th World Series on October 6 and ended with Game 5 on October 10. In the fifth iteration of this World Series matchup (and a rematch of the previous year), the Yankees defeated the Giants, four games to one, capturing their sixth championship in franchise history, and their second in a four-World Series run. With this victory, the Yankees became the team with the most World Series victories, a feat that continues today.

The fifth All-Star Game was held on July 7 at Griffith Stadium in Washington, D.C., home of the Washington Senators. The American League won, 8–3.

== Schedule ==
The 1937 schedule consisted of 154 games for all teams in the American League and National League, each of which had eight teams. Each team was scheduled to play 22 games against the other seven teams of their respective league. This continued the format put in place since the 1904 season (except for 1919) and would be used until 1961 in the American League and 1962 in the National League.

Opening Day, April 19, featured four teams across both leagues play. The final day of the regular season was on October 3 and featured all sixteen teams, the first since 1935. The World Series took place between October 6 and October 10.

== Rule changes ==
The 1937 season saw the following rule changes:

- Regarding night games, the National and American Leagues allowed teams to play up to seven night games per season at home as long as the visiting team agreed.
- It was decided to make the baseball slightly "deader" (that is, less effective off the bat), following poor pitching performances and stats of the previous season.
- New baseballs created would now have "Official Major League Baseball" stamped, as opposed to either National or American Leagues (although both leagues would frequently use their own branded balls through the end of the 20th century).

== Teams ==
An asterisk (*) denotes the ballpark a team played the minority of their home games at

League	Team	City	Ballpark	Capacity	Manager
American League	Boston Red Sox	Boston, Massachusetts	Fenway Park	33,817	Joe Cronin
American League	Chicago White Sox	Chicago, Illinois	Comiskey Park	52,000	Jimmy Dykes
American League	Cleveland Indians	Cleveland, Ohio	League Park	22,500	Steve O'Neill
American League	Cleveland Indians	Cleveland, Ohio	Cleveland Stadium*	78,811*	Steve O'Neill
American League	Detroit Tigers	Detroit, Michigan	Navin Field	36,000	Mickey Cochrane
American League	Detroit Tigers	Detroit, Michigan	Navin Field	36,000	Del Baker
American League	Detroit Tigers	Detroit, Michigan	Navin Field	36,000	Cy Perkins
American League	New York Yankees	New York, New York	Yankee Stadium	71,699	Joe McCarthy
American League	Philadelphia Athletics	Philadelphia, Pennsylvania	Shibe Park	33,000	Connie Mack
American League	Philadelphia Athletics	Philadelphia, Pennsylvania	Shibe Park	33,000	Earle Mack
American League	St. Louis Browns	St. Louis, Missouri	Sportsman's Park	34,023	Rogers Hornsby
American League	St. Louis Browns	St. Louis, Missouri	Sportsman's Park	34,023	Jim Bottomley
American League	Washington Senators	Washington, D.C.	Griffith Stadium	32,000	Bucky Harris
National League	Boston Bees	Boston, Massachusetts	National League Park	41,700	Bill McKechnie
National League	Brooklyn Dodgers	New York, New York	Ebbets Field	35,000	Burleigh Grimes
National League	Chicago Cubs	Chicago, Illinois	Wrigley Field	40,000	Charlie Grimm
National League	Cincinnati Reds	Cincinnati, Ohio	Crosley Field	26,060	Chuck Dressen
National League	Cincinnati Reds	Cincinnati, Ohio	Crosley Field	26,060	Bobby Wallace
National League	New York Giants	New York, New York	Polo Grounds	51,856	Bill Terry
National League	Philadelphia Phillies	Philadelphia, Pennsylvania	Baker Bowl	18,800	Jimmie Wilson
National League	Pittsburgh Pirates	Pittsburgh, Pennsylvania	Forbes Field	41,000	Pie Traynor
National League	St. Louis Cardinals	St. Louis, Missouri	Sportsman's Park	34,023	Frankie Frisch

== Standings ==
=== American League ===
American League
Team	W	L	Pct.	GB	Home	Road
New York Yankees	102	52	.662	—	57‍–‍20	45‍–‍32
Detroit Tigers	89	65	.578	13	49‍–‍28	40‍–‍37
Chicago White Sox	86	68	.558	16	47‍–‍30	39‍–‍38
Cleveland Indians	83	71	.539	19	50‍–‍28	33‍–‍43
Boston Red Sox	80	72	.526	21	44‍–‍29	36‍–‍43
Washington Senators	73	80	.477	28½	43‍–‍35	30‍–‍45
Philadelphia Athletics	54	97	.358	46½	27‍–‍50	27‍–‍47
St. Louis Browns	46	108	.299	56	25‍–‍51	21‍–‍57

=== National League ===
National League
Team	W	L	Pct.	GB	Home	Road
New York Giants	95	57	.625	—	50‍–‍25	45‍–‍32
Chicago Cubs	93	61	.604	3	46‍–‍32	47‍–‍29
Pittsburgh Pirates	86	68	.558	10	46‍–‍32	40‍–‍36
St. Louis Cardinals	81	73	.526	15	45‍–‍33	36‍–‍40
Boston Bees	79	73	.520	16	43‍–‍33	36‍–‍40
Brooklyn Dodgers	62	91	.405	33½	36‍–‍39	26‍–‍52
Philadelphia Phillies	61	92	.399	34½	29‍–‍45	32‍–‍47
Cincinnati Reds	56	98	.364	40	28‍–‍51	28‍–‍47

=== Tie games ===
13 tie games (9 in AL, 4 in NL), which are not factored into winning percentage or games behind (and were often replayed again) occurred throughout the season.

==== American League ====
- Boston Red Sox, 2
- Cleveland Indians, 2
- Detroit Tigers, 1
- New York Yankees, 3
- Philadelphia Athletics, 3
- St. Louis Browns, 2
- Washington Senators, 5

==== National League ====
- Brooklyn Dodgers, 2
- Cincinnati Reds, 1
- Philadelphia Phillies, 2
- St. Louis Cardinals, 3

== Postseason ==
The postseason began on October 6 and ended on October 10 with the New York Yankees defeating the New York Giants in the 1937 World Series in five games.

=== Bracket ===
World Series
AL	New York Yankees	4
NL	New York Giants	1

== Managerial changes ==
=== Off-season ===
Team	Former Manager	New Manager
Brooklyn Dodgers	Casey Stengel	Burleigh Grimes
Detroit Tigers	Del Baker	Mickey Cochrane

=== In-season ===
Team	Former Manager	New Manager
Cincinnati Reds	Chuck Dressen	Bobby Wallace
Detroit Tigers	Mickey Cochrane	Del Baker
Detroit Tigers	Del Baker	Cy Perkins
Philadelphia Athletics	Connie Mack	Earle Mack
St. Louis Browns	Rogers Hornsby	Jim Bottomley

== League leaders ==
Any team shown in small text indicates a previous team a player was on during the season.

=== American League ===
Hitting leaders
Stat	Player	Total
AVG	Charlie Gehringer (DET)	.371
OPS	Lou Gehrig (NYY)	1.116
HR	Joe DiMaggio (NYY)	46
RBI	Hank Greenberg (DET)	184
R	Joe DiMaggio (NYY)	151
H	Beau Bell (SLB)	218
SB	Ben Chapman (BOS/WSH); Billy Werber (PHA)	35

Pitching leaders
Stat	Player	Total
W	Lefty Gomez^{1} (NYY)	21
L	Harry Kelley (PHA)	21
ERA	Lefty Gomez^{1} (NYY)	2.33
K	Lefty Gomez^{1} (NYY)	194
IP	Wes Ferrell (WSH/BOS)	281.0
SV	Clint Brown (CWS)	18
WHIP	Monty Stratton (CWS)	1.087

^{1} American League Triple Crown pitching winner

=== National League ===
Hitting leaders
Stat	Player	Total
AVG	Joe Medwick^{2} (STL)	.374
OPS	Joe Medwick (STL)	1.056
HR	Joe Medwick^{2} (STL); Mel Ott (NYG)	31
RBI	Joe Medwick^{2} (STL)	154
R	Joe Medwick (STL)	111
H	Joe Medwick (STL)	237
SB	Augie Galan (CHC)	23

^{2} National League Triple Crown batting winner

Pitching leaders
Stat	Player	Total
W	Carl Hubbell (NYG)	22
L	Wayne LaMaster (PHI)	19
ERA	Jim Turner (BSN)	2.38
K	Carl Hubbell (NYG)	159
IP	Claude Passeau (PHI)	292.1
SV	Mace Brown (PIT); Cliff Melton (NYG)	7
WHIP	Jim Turner (BSN)	1.091

== Milestones ==
=== Batters ===
==== Cycles ====
- Gee Walker (DET):
  - Walker hit for his first cycle, the third in franchise history, and the fourth reverse cycle in major league history, on April 20 against the Cleveland Indians.
- Joe DiMaggio (NYY):
  - DiMaggio hit for his first cycle and the seventh in franchise history, on July 9 against the Washington Senators.
- Lou Gehrig (NYY):
  - Gehrig hit for his second cycle and the eighth in franchise history, on August 1 against the St. Louis Browns.

=== Pitchers ===
==== No-hitters ====
- Bill Dietrich (CWS):
  - Dietrich threw his first career no-hitter and 10th no-hitter in franchise history, by defeating the St. Louis Browns 8–0 on June 1. Dietrich walked two and struck out five.

== Awards and honors ==
=== Regular season ===
Baseball Writers' Association of America Awards
BBWAA Award	National League	American League
Most Valuable Player	Joe Medwick (STL)	Charlie Gehringer (DET)

=== Other awards ===
The Sporting News Awards
Award	National League	American League
Most Valuable Player	Joe Medwick (STL)	Charlie Gehringer (DET)
Player of the Year	—	Johnny Allen (CLE)
Manager of the Year	Bill McKechnie (BSN)	—
Executive of the Year	—	Ed Barrow (NYY)

=== Baseball Hall of Fame ===
- Nap Lajoie
- Tris Speaker
- Cy Young
- Connie Mack (manager)
- John McGraw (manager)
- Morgan Bulkeley (executive)
- Ban Johnson (executive)
- George Wright (executive/pioneer contributor)

== Home field attendance ==
Team name	Wins	%±	Home attendance	%±	Per game
Detroit Tigers	89	7.2%	1,072,276	22.4%	13,926
New York Yankees	102	0.0%	998,148	2.2%	12,635
New York Giants	95	3.3%	926,887	10.6%	12,358
Chicago Cubs	93	6.9%	895,020	28.0%	11,475
Chicago White Sox	86	6.2%	589,245	33.7%	7,653
Cleveland Indians	83	3.8%	564,849	12.9%	7,242
Boston Red Sox	80	8.1%	559,659	−10.7%	7,563
Brooklyn Dodgers	62	−7.5%	482,481	−1.5%	6,348
Pittsburgh Pirates	86	2.4%	459,679	23.4%	5,893
St. Louis Cardinals	81	−6.9%	430,811	−3.9%	5,385
Philadelphia Athletics	54	1.9%	430,738	51.0%	5,452
Cincinnati Reds	56	−24.3%	411,221	−11.8%	5,140
Washington Senators	73	−11.0%	397,799	4.8%	4,972
Boston Bees	79	11.3%	385,339	13.1%	5,070
Philadelphia Phillies	61	13.0%	212,790	−14.6%	2,876
St. Louis Browns	46	−19.3%	123,121	32.0%	1,578

== Venues ==
Over 78 home games, the Cleveland Indians played 63 games at League Park and 15 games at Cleveland Stadium. Only Sunday and Monday home games saw games played at Cleveland Stadium. This would be the 3rd of 12 seasons since 1932 that saw the Indians play at both venues.

== See also ==
- 1937 in baseball (Events, Births, Deaths)
