= Lon Warneke =

American baseball player and umpire (1909–1976)

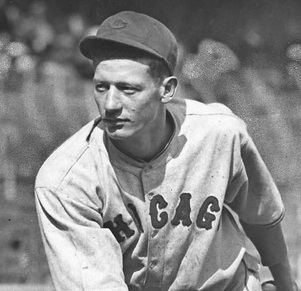
- Warneke in 1932
- Pitcher
- Born: March 28, 1909; Mount Ida, Arkansas, U.S.
- Died: June 23, 1976 (aged 67); Hot Springs, Arkansas, U.S.
- Batted: Right Threw: Right

MLB debut
- April 18, 1930, for the Chicago Cubs

Last MLB appearance
- September 29, 1945, for the Chicago Cubs

MLB statistics
- Win–loss record: 192–121
- Earned run average: 3.18
- Strikeouts: 1,140
- Stats at Baseball Reference

Teams
- Chicago Cubs (1930–1936); St. Louis Cardinals (1937–1942); Chicago Cubs (1942–1943, 1945)

Career highlights and awards
- 5× All-Star (1933, 1934, 1936, 1939, 1941); NL wins leader (1932); MLB ERA leader (1932); Pitched a no-hitter on August 30, 1941

Lonnie Warneke (/ˈwɔːrnəki/ WOR-nə-kee; March 28, 1909 – June 23, 1976), nicknamed "the Arkansas Hummingbird", was an American Major League Baseball player, Major League umpire, county judge, and businessman from Montgomery County, Arkansas, whose career won-loss record as a pitcher for the Chicago Cubs (1930–36, 1942–43, 1945) and St. Louis Cardinals (1937–42) was 192–121.

Warneke pitched for the National League in the first Major League Baseball All-Star Game in 1933, hitting the first triple and scoring the first National League run in All-Star game history. He pitched in two other All-Star Games (1934, 1936) and was also selected in 1939 and 1941.

Warneke pitched in two World Series for the Cubs (1932, 1935), compiling a record of 2–1, with a 2.63 earned run average (ERA). He pitched a no-hitter for the Cardinals on August 30, 1941; opened the 1934 season with back to back one-hitters (April 17 and 22); and set a Major League Baseball fielding record for pitchers (since eclipsed) of 227 consecutive chances without an error, covering 163 games. After retiring as a player in 1945, Warneke was an umpire in the Pacific Coast League for three years and then in the National League from 1949 to 1955. Warneke is the only person who has both played and umpired in both an All-Star Game and a World Series.

== Early years ==
Lonnie Warneke, which was his baptismal name, was born March 28, 1909, the fourth of five children to Louis W. ("Luke") Warneke and Martha Belle Scott Warneke in Owley, Arkansas, six miles south of Mount Ida, the county seat of Montgomery County. Mount Ida had a population of 298 in 1920 and 512 in 1930. Luke Warneke (who stood 6 ft 6 in (1.98 m)) had homesteaded 160 acres and was a successful farmer in the farming community of Owley, which consisted of fifteen families. Montgomery County was one of the most rural and sparsely populated counties of Arkansas; by 1910 its population had peaked at 12,455. At the time of Lon Warneke's birth the county had no paved roads, no electricity, and no running water. Luke Warneke, from 1907 to 1913, was in charge of improving the county roads and, using the newly acquired road graders drawn by eight mules, he made major improvements to the roads throughout the county, transforming them from dirt trails often overgrown by brush, pocketed by mud holes, and punctured by tree stumps, to passable, graded two-lane (wagon) roads—although still unpaved. Electricity and running water would not come to most of the county until the 1930s.

Young Lonnie Warneke attended grade school in the one-room schoolhouse in Owley. He soon grew to be among the tallest students in the tiny school. He helped his father on the farm and did chores for his mother. In his free time, he enjoyed the outdoors, hunted and fished; he also played the guitar and fiddle—pursuits that would occupy him his entire life. "Lonnie Warneke is a country boy. He loves hunting dogs and good guns, the trails and loneliness of the wilderness in the rugged mountains surrounding his old home." Even after he became a professional ballplayer, he would return to the country and enjoy the outdoors—as well as play in ballgames with the locals. Because the school in Owley went only through "middle school" years, Warneke attended the nearest high school, that in Mount Ida. Because of his 6 ft 2 in (1.88 m) stature, Warneke played first base for the high school team. In his final year he was pressed into service as a relief pitcher: Warneke faced a semi-professional team and struck out five of six batters he faced. Warneke also played for the Mount Ida Athletics, a squad that played Montgomery County area teams.

== Minor league career (1928–30) ==
After high school Warneke moved to Houston, Texas, where his older sister, Kate, and her husband lived. Warneke got a job delivering telegrams by bicycle for Western Union. In Spring 1928, Warneke approached the president of the Houston Buffaloes, a Texas League baseball team in the St. Louis Cardinals organization, and asked for a tryout as a first baseman. Rebuffed at first, Warneke offered to pay his own way to training camp. At camp, Buffaloes manager Frank "Pancho" Snyder (former catcher for the Cardinals and New York Giants) took a look at Warneke and told the nineteen-year-old that he had the arm of a pitcher. After Snyder's evaluation, Warneke was sent off to pitch for the Laurel Cardinals of the Cotton States League. Warneke impressed no one at Laurel and the Cardinals released him. Due to Warneke's ensuing major league success, the St. Louis Cardinals later instituted a policy such that "any decision to release a player who possesse[s] even one major-league skill (speed, arm, defense, hitting, power) must be made by more than one person" of their organization. Warneke completed the year with another team in the Cotton States League, the Alexandria Reds, a team affiliated with Shreveport of the Texas League. One of Warneke's teammates on Alexandria was Ray Prim, with whom he would pitch for the Cubs in 1943 and 1945. As a converted pitcher in his first professional season, Warneke posted a 1928 combined record for Laurel and Alexandria of 6 wins, 14 losses, with a 5.32 ERA in 176 innings pitched.

Warneke returned to Alexandria for the 1929 season and posted a 16–10 record, with a 3.09 ERA in 245 innings pitched. Alexandria finished first under manager Pete Kilduff. Warneke's success attracted the Chicago Cubs, that year's National League pennant winner. On August 23, just before the Cotton States season closed, the Associated Press carried a story announcing that Warneke had been sold to the Cubs "for $10,000 or more", the highest price ever paid for a Cotton States League player. The sale was initially denied by the Shreveport organization but then confirmed by telegraph to the Alexandria Daily Town Talk a few days later by Kilduff, although he stated the sales price of Warneke was $7,500.

Whatever the figure, Lonnie "Country" Warneke reported to the Chicago Cubs spring training facilities on Santa Catalina Island, California in late-February 1930, a month before his twenty-first birthday. Warneke was at once involved in an on-field accident that sent him to the hospital. On February 24, while pitchers were taking batting practice, fellow rookie Bill McAfee, fresh out of the University of Michigan, was taking swings and lost his grip on his bat, sending it hurtling against the forehead of Warneke, who was standing near the batting cage. Warneke slumped to the ground but suffered no serious damage, although he did have to report to the hospital and receive a couple stitches.

Warneke made the regular season roster for the Cubs, although he appeared in only one game before being assigned to the Cubs Class-AA affiliate Reading Keystones on May 23. A week later Warneke pitched a complete game 6–2 victory over Newark, allowing eight hits and striking out five. Yet success largely escaped Warneke that year, as he compiled a 9–12 win–loss record with a 6.03 ERA. He allowed 236 hits in 185 innings for Reading, which finished under .500. Despite such numbers, Warneke would never appear in another minor league game; instead he played at the major league level for the next fourteen years.

Among his teammates on Reading was infielder Billy Jurges, who would play in the major leagues for seventeen years, including six seasons (1931–36) with Warneke as a Cub.

== Major league career ==
=== Chicago Cubs (1930–36) ===
==== First major league appearance ====
Lon Warneke appeared in one major league game for the Cubs in 1930. His major league debut was on the fourth day of the season, Friday, April 18, at Sportsman's Park, St. Louis versus the Cardinals with 6000 in attendance. The twenty-one-year-old Warneke took the mound in the bottom of the sixth in relief of Guy Bush, with the Cardinals ahead 5–0. Warneke promptly doubled the Cubs' deficit. He worked the sixth inning and gave up one run. In the seventh he recorded one out and gave up another four runs before being pulled for fellow rookie Lynn Nelson. In all, Warneke faced eleven batters, walked five of them, surrendered two hits and allowed five earned runs and a wild pitch in 1 1/3 innings. The final score of the game was 11–1; the winning pitcher was Bill ("Wild Bill") Hallahan. Warneke would not pitch again in the majors until exactly one year later.

The defending National League Champion Cubs finished in second place, two games behind the Cardinals in 1930. Rogers Hornsby, future Hall of Famer, took over managing the Cubs from Joe McCarthy with four games left in the 1930 season. Hornsby continued as player-manager for the Cubs throughout 1931 and the first ninety-nine games of 1932.

Warneke's second major league game was a year to the date after his first. It was also his first major league loss. This time he took the mound on the fifth day of the season, Saturday, April 18, 1931, before 30,000 at Wrigley Field in Chicago versus the visiting Cardinals. The Cubs had rallied for two runs in the ninth to tie the score 5–5 and, having used eight pitchers in the first four games of the season and another two in this game, sent Warneke out in the top of the tenth. He again showed signs of wildness, walking three of six batters faced, allowing a hit and two earned runs, and lasting two thirds of the inning before getting pulled. The Cubs could not make up the deficit and lost 7–5, with Bill ("Wild Bill") Hallahan once again recording the win—and Warneke the loss.

In two games, a year apart, Warneke's major league record was 0–1, 2 innings pitched, allowing seven earned runs on three hits and eight walks, for an ERA of 31.50 and a WHIP of 5.50. Although Warneke was not sent down to the minors, and never saw minor league service again in his career, he didn't pitch again for the Cubs for two months.

On June 18 Warneke pitched a scoreless inning of relief in a game at Ebbets Field against the Brooklyn Dodgers. He fanned two batters, which strike outs were the first two of 1,140 in his career.

Warneke's performance earned him the first start of his career, three days later, on Sunday, June 21 in the series closer against Brooklyn. With 15,000 in attendance, Warneke pitched seven innings, allowing six earned runs on nine hits and five walks, with one hit batsman. He allowed his only home run of the season to the Dodgers' cleanup hitter, Del Bissonette, and departed the game after seven with the Cubs down 6–3. Chicago rallied for three in the top of the ninth, thus removing Warneke as the pitcher of record. The Dodgers scored one in the ninth to win the game.

Warneke lost his next two starts, versus the Pittsburgh Pirates and the Philadelphia Phillies, before recording his first major league win. On Wednesday, August 5, Warneke pitched a complete game victory at Wrigley Field against the Cincinnati Reds for the first of 192 career victories and 192 career complete games. Warneke faced 37 batters, allowing 2 earned runs on 8 hits (all singles) and two walks, while striking out 3, winning 3–2. Warneke doubled to drive in the first run of his career.

The Chicago Tribune wrote: "Of great importance in yesterday's game was Lon Warneke, another of the [player-manager, Rogers] Hornsby debutants who may be heard from in the future. The slat-like lad threw so skillfully that...the Reds were confined to eight hits."

Warneke started three more games in 1931, two of them complete games. For the year, Warneke finished 2–4 with a 3.22 ERA in twenty games, including seven starts. In 64 1/3 innings pitched he allowed 67 hits and 37 walks while striking out 27. The Cubs ended the year 84–70 in third place, 17 games behind the repeat league champion Cardinals.

Between 1903 and 1942 the Cubs and Chicago White Sox would almost annually face off in a postseason "City Series" when neither team was playing in the World Series. The series was officially sanctioned by Major League Baseball beginning in 1905. Although official rules and league umpires were used, results and statistics, just as those for the World Series, were not added to regular season totals. Other such "city series" were played elsewhere, such as in Boston, Philadelphia, New York, and Ohio. The 1931 Chicago City Series was played on seven consecutive days from Wednesday, September 30 to Tuesday, October 6. Warneke played in Game 1 of the 1931 Chicago City Series, in which 43-year-old Urban (Red) Faber of the White Sox shut out the Cubs 9–0 at Wrigley Field before a crowd of 15,000. Warneke came on in the seventh inning, faced six batters, allowed one hit and one walk, no runs.

After the 1931 season, Warneke returned home to the family farm in Owley and invested part of his summer pay in 200 feeder cattle at $2.00 a head. Soon after fattening his herd, the cattle market bottomed out. Warneke remarked that he would "keep 'em as pets."

==== 1932: Breakout season ====
In 1932, Cubs manager, Rogers Hornsby credited veteran backup catcher Zack Taylor with helping correct a flaw in Warneke's pitching delivery. Instead of looking at the plate when he threw, he looked down at his feet. Taylor corrected the error and Warneke gained more control over his blazing fastball and hard-breaking curveball. Warneke mused that he would win "about a half dozen games" during the regular season. Instead, Warneke led the National League in wins (22), earned run average (2.37), shutouts (4), and winning percentage (.786), leading the Cubs to the National League Pennant and placing second in Most Valuable Player (MVP) Award voting. Warneke rose to the top of a pitching staff that included Guy Bush (19–11), Charlie Root (15–10), and Pat Malone, another 15-game winner. Offensive stars included Gabby Hartnett, Charlie Grimm, Riggs Stephenson, Billy Herman.

Warneke opened the season with five straight complete game victories, helping the Cubs to a 17–6 first-place start to the season. From mid-June to late July, Warneke ran off a nine-game winning streak, all complete games, in a span of 44 Cubs games in which the rest of the pitching staff went 14–21. On August 4, The Sporting News reported on its front page: "Warneke...is the sensation of the outfit, and there is as yet no indication that he is going to slow down." That same day first baseman Charlie Grimm took over as the Cubs' manager, replacing player-manager Rogers Hornsby, whose record was 53–46; the Cubs were in second place, five games behind the Pittsburgh Pirates. On August 11, Warneke started, but did not win, a 3–2 extra inning victory in which the Cubs leapfrogged over the Pirates into first place, where they remained for the last 47 games of the season. The Cubs finished 37–18 under Grimm. Warneke went 5–1 with two shut outs and four no decisions down the stretch.

===== 1932 World Series =====
The Cubs' World Series opponent were the New York Yankees, who finished 107–47, outscoring their opponents 1002–724. Led by sluggers Babe Ruth (.341–41–137), Lou Gehrig (.349–34–151), Tony Lazzeri (.300–15–113), Bill Dickey (.310–15–84), and Ben Chapman (.299–10–107), the team was never shut out all season. The pitching staff included Lefty Gomez (24–7), Red Ruffing (18–7), George Pipgras (16–9), and Johnny Allen (17–4). The Cubs' scored 720 runs (fourth in the N.L.) and were shut out eight times. Only three Cub's batters drove in more than 65 runs: Stephenson, 85; Grimm, 80; Kiki Cuyler, 77. Both teams led their leagues in ERA: the Yankees, 3.98 and the Cubs, 3.44.

The Yankees swept the Cubs in the World Series. Warneke started and lost Game 2, 5–2, before 50,000 fans at Yankee Stadium in New York. Nevertheless, he was the Cubs' most effective starter during the series, throwing Chicago's only complete game, in which he scattered ten hits, all singles. Warneke suffered early game jitters, walking the first two batters he faced (both scored) before striking out Babe Ruth. Warneke allowed two more runs in the third and another in the fifth. He retired the side in the sixth, seventh, and eighth innings, facing the minimum nine batters. He struck out seven Yankees in the game and eight in the Series, the most by any Cubs' starter and twice as many as any other Cubs' pitcher. On just two days rest, with the Cubs down three games to none, Warneke was called upon to relieve in the first inning of Game 4; he departed in the fourth inning with the Cubs ahead.

===== 1932 Accolades =====
Major American newspapers of the day called Warneke the outstanding National League pitcher of the 1932 season and The Sporting News (which had hailed Warneke as "a great pitcher, such as pops up once in a lifetime") named him as one of two pitchers to its 1932 All-Star team, honors foreshadowing the then non-existent Cy Young Award.

=== St. Louis Cardinals (1937–42) ===
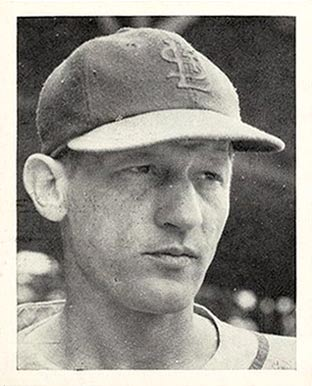
Warneke with the Cardinals

In October 1936 the Cubs traded Warneke to the St. Louis Cardinals for infielder Ripper Collins and pitcher Roy Parmelee. The trade was not popular with many Cub fans and may have cost the Cubs the pennant. Cub's Gabby Hartnett, player-manager from 1938 to 1940, said "That trade hurt us. It probably cost us the pennant in '37."

Without Warneke the Cubs finished 93–61, in second place, three games behind the New York Giants. Meanwhile, Warneke led the Cardinals staff with an 18–11 record. Parmelee went 7–8 for the Cubs and was sold the following year; Collins lasted two seasons with the Cubs. Warneke won 83 games for the Cardinals during his five and a half seasons in St. Louis.

In 1937, Warneke led the Cardinals' staff with an 18–11 record. This was the only season in which Warneke and fellow Arkansas phenom pitcher Dizzy Dean were on the same team.

With the Cardinals, Warneke played guitar and banjo and sang as a member of teammate John "Pepper" Martin's "Mississippi Mudcats" band.

=== Chicago Cubs (1942–43 and 1945) ===
On July 8, 1942, two days after the All-Star Game, the Chicago Cubs purchased Warneke's contract for $7,500. Through the remainder of the 1942 season, Warneke had 15 appearances (12 of them starts) with the Cubs, compiling a 5–7 record. In 1943, he made 21 appearances (10 of them starts), and had a 4–5 record.

Warneke was notified that he passed his military pre-induction physical on March 28, 1944, his 35th birthday. He had previously announced that he was ready "to toss hand grenades at Hitler and Hirohito." As a civilian director, Warneke was put in charge of recreation at the Shumaker Naval Ammunition Depot near Camden, Arkansas, where he organized, managed, and pitched in a baseball league comprising teams from nearby cities, colleges, and military facilities. Many civilians worked in supporting positions during World War II, and Warneke's role was consistent with President Roosevelt's 1942 statement that baseball was a morale booster. Warneke rejoined the Cubs in June 1945, but pitched in only nine games in his final season as a player, compiling an 0–1 record. Although the Cubs won the pennant, Warneke did not appear in the 1945 World Series.

== Umpiring career ==
Warneke as an NL umpire, c. 1955

Warneke first umpired a major league game in 1940, under unusual circumstances. A game on April 23 between the Cincinnati Reds and St. Louis Cardinals had been postponed, and when it was about to be played at Crosley Field on May 13, it was found that no umpires had been assigned by the National League. Umpire Larry Goetz, who lived in Cincinnati, was summoned to the ballpark and served as home plate umpire. Reds' coach Jimmie Wilson umpired at first base, and Warneke umpired at third base. The game ended as an 8–8 tie after 14 innings, called due to darkness.

After his playing career ended, Warneke umpired in the Pacific Coast League for the 1946, 1947, and 1948 seasons. In 1949, he became a National League umpire, working that season on a three-man umpiring crew with Jocko Conlan and Bill Stewart. Warneke umpired through the 1955 season, working a total of 1055 games while making 44 ejections. He was an umpire for the 1952 All-Star Game and for the 1954 World Series; he was umpiring along the left field line when Willie Mays made "The Catch" on September 29, 1954. Warneke resigned as an umpire after the 1955 season.

== Later life and death ==
Warneke was a businessman in Hot Springs, Arkansas, before serving as County Judge of Garland County, Arkansas, from 1963 to 1972. Warneke was elected to the Arkansas Sports Hall of Fame on January 19, 1961, and still leads all Arkansas players in many Major League pitching categories including wins, games started, innings pitched, complete games, and shutouts. Warneke died of a heart attack on June 23, 1976, at his home in Hot Springs; he is buried in Owley Cemetery in Montgomery County. On July 21, 2011, Warneke was posthumously inducted into the Reading Baseball Hall of Fame.

== See also ==
- List of Major League Baseball annual ERA leaders
- List of Major League Baseball annual wins leaders
- List of Major League Baseball no-hitters

Achievements
Preceded by Tex Carleton	No-hitter pitcher August 30, 1941	Succeeded by Jim Tobin
