= 1930 World Series =

1930 Major League Baseball championship series

Team (Wins)	Managers	Season
Philadelphia Athletics (4)	Connie Mack	102–52, .662, GA: 8
St. Louis Cardinals (2)	Gabby Street	92–62, .597, GA: 2
- Dates: October 1–8
- Venue(s): Shibe Park (Philadelphia); Sportsman's Park (St. Louis)
- Umpires: George Moriarty (AL), Cy Rigler (NL); Harry Geisel (AL), Beans Reardon (NL)
- Hall of Famers: Athletics: Connie Mack (manager); Mickey Cochrane; Jimmie Foxx; Lefty Grove; Eddie Collins; Al Simmons; Cardinals: Jim Bottomley; Dizzy Dean (DNP); Frankie Frisch; Burleigh Grimes; Chick Hafey; Jesse Haines

Broadcast
- Radio: NBC; CBS
- Radio announcers: NBC: Graham McNamee; Ford Frick; CBS: Ted Husing

The 1930 World Series was the championship series of Major League Baseball for the 1930 season. The 27th edition of the World Series, it was a best-of-seven playoff that pitted the American League (AL) champion (and defending World Series champion) Philadelphia Athletics against the National League (NL) champion St. Louis Cardinals. The Athletics defeated the Cardinals in six games to win their fifth championship. Philadelphia's pitching ace Lefty Grove, and George Earnshaw, the No. 2 man in Mack's rotation, won two games apiece. Earnshaw also pitched seven scoreless innings as the Game 5 starter, but ended up with a no-decision as Grove relieved him in the eighth and took the win on Jimmie Foxx's two-run homer in the top of the ninth for the game's only scoring.

The Cardinals led the National League in runs scored and averaged six runs per game in the regular season, but could manage only two runs per game in this World Series.

This was the Athletics' fifth World Series championship win (following 1910, 1911, 1913 and 1929), and their last in Philadelphia before moving to Kansas City in 1955 and then Oakland in 1968—where they would win four more World Series titles (1972, 1973, 1974, and 1989) before moving to Las Vegas in 2024. Their win this year tied them with the Boston Red Sox for most World Series wins as of that point (five) until 1937, when the New York Yankees surged ahead of both in World Series wins and have gone on to amass 27 World Series championships as of 2026.

The city of Philadelphia would have to wait 50 years until its next World Series championship, when the Phillies became the last of the "Original Sixteen" MLB franchises to win a World Series.

This World Series also marks the beginning of the Cardinals run of dominance in the National League in the early 1930s. They would win the pennant three times between 1930 and 1934 and the World Series in 1931 and '34.

This would also be the final World Series where both teams uniforms did not have numbers.

== Summary ==
AL Philadelphia Athletics (4) vs. NL St. Louis Cardinals (2)

Game	Date	Score	Location	Time	Attendance
1	October 1	St. Louis Cardinals – 2, Philadelphia Athletics – 5	Shibe Park	1:48	32,295
2	October 2	St. Louis Cardinals – 1, Philadelphia Athletics – 6	Shibe Park	1:47	32,295
3	October 4	Philadelphia Athletics – 0, St. Louis Cardinals – 5	Sportsman's Park	1:55	36,944
4	October 5	Philadelphia Athletics – 1, St. Louis Cardinals – 3	Sportsman's Park	1:41	39,946
5	October 6	Philadelphia Athletics – 2, St. Louis Cardinals – 0	Sportsman's Park	1:58	38,844
6	October 8	St. Louis Cardinals – 1, Philadelphia Athletics – 7	Shibe Park	1:46	32,295

== Matchups ==
=== Game 1 ===
October 1, 1930 1:30 pm (ET) at Shibe Park in Philadelphia, Pennsylvania
Team	1	2	3	4	5	6	7	8	9	R	H	E
St. Louis	0	0	2	0	0	0	0	0	0	2	9	0
Philadelphia	0	1	0	1	0	1	1	1	X	5	5	0
WP: Lefty Grove (1–0) LP: Burleigh Grimes (0–1); Home runs: STL: None; PHA: Al Simmons (1), Mickey Cochrane (1)

The A's managed only five hits off of Grimes in Game 1, but all were for extra bases and each produced a run in five different innings. Al Simmons and Mickey Cochrane hit solo home runs for the A's, helping Lefty Grove to a 5–2 win. The A's struck first in the bottom of the second when Jimmie Foxx tripled and scored on Bing Miller's sacrifice fly. The Cardinals loaded the bases in the third on three straight leadoff singles, then Taylor Douthit's lineout and Sparky Adams's sacrifice fly scored a run each. Simmons's home run in the fourth tied the game. In the sixth, Max Bishop walked with one out and scored on Jimmy Dykes' double. Next inning, Mule Haas tripled with one out and scored on Joe Boley's groundout. Cochrane's eighth inning home run gave the A's their last run of the game.

=== Game 2 ===
October 2, 1930 1:30 pm (ET) at Shibe Park in Philadelphia, Pennsylvania
Team	1	2	3	4	5	6	7	8	9	R	H	E
St. Louis	0	1	0	0	0	0	0	0	0	1	6	2
Philadelphia	2	0	2	2	0	0	0	0	X	6	7	2
WP: George Earnshaw (1–0) LP: Flint Rhem (0–1); Home runs: STL: George Watkins (1); PHA: Mickey Cochrane (2)

George Earnshaw allowed six hits and walked one, putting the A's ahead 2–0. The Athletics scored six runs in the first four innings to put the game out of reach. Mickey Cochrane's two-out home run in the first gave the A's their first run. After Al Simmons singled, Jimmie Foxx's RBI double made it 2–0 A's. George Watkins's home run in the second gave the Cardinals their only run of the game. In the third, Cochrane reached on an error and scored on Simmons's double. After an intentional walk, Bing Miller's RBI single made it 4–1 A's. Philadelphia added two more runs next inning on Jimmy Dykes's double.

=== Game 3 ===
October 4, 1930 1:30 pm (CT) at Sportsman's Park in St. Louis, Missouri
Team	1	2	3	4	5	6	7	8	9	R	H	E
Philadelphia	0	0	0	0	0	0	0	0	0	0	7	0
St. Louis	0	0	0	1	1	0	2	1	X	5	10	0
WP: Bill Hallahan (1–0) LP: Rube Walberg (0–1); Home runs: PHA: None; STL: Taylor Douthit (1)

After the A's loaded the bases in the top of the first, Hallahan settled down and pitched a shutout. Philadelphia left a total of 11 men on base. The Cardinals scored the game's first run on Taylor Douthit's home run in the fourth, then next inning hit three consecutive one-out singles, the last of which by Charlie Gelbert scoring a run. In the seventh, Bill Shores allowed three consecutive leadoff singles, the last of which by Jimmie Wilson scoring two runs. Next inning, the Cardinals added another run off of Jack Quinn on back-to-back one-out doubles by Jim Bottomley and Chick Hafey.

=== Game 4 ===
October 5, 1930 1:30 pm (CT) at Sportsman's Park in St. Louis, Missouri
Team	1	2	3	4	5	6	7	8	9	R	H	E
Philadelphia	1	0	0	0	0	0	0	0	0	1	4	1
St. Louis	0	0	1	2	0	0	0	0	X	3	5	1
WP: Jesse Haines (1–0) LP: Lefty Grove (1–1)

An error by Jimmy Dykes in the fourth inning allowed the Cardinals to score two runs. Haines did not allow a hit after the third inning. The A's got on the board in the first on Al Simmons's RBI single, but the Cardinals tied the game in the third when Charlie Gelbert tripled and scored on Jesse Haines's single. In the fourth, Chick Hafey hit a two-out ground rule double and scored on Dykes's error on Ray Blades's ground ball. Blades then scored on Gelbert's RBI single.

=== Game 5 ===
October 6, 1930 1:30 pm (CT) at Sportsman's Park in St. Louis, Missouri
Team	1	2	3	4	5	6	7	8	9	R	H	E
Philadelphia	0	0	0	0	0	0	0	0	2	2	5	0
St. Louis	0	0	0	0	0	0	0	0	0	0	3	1
WP: Lefty Grove (2–1) LP: Burleigh Grimes (0–2); Home runs: PHA: Jimmie Foxx (1); STL: None

George Earnshaw dueled Burleigh Grimes scoreless through seven innings before Lefty Grove took over for Earnshaw in the eighth. In the top of the ninth, Grimes walked Mickey Cochrane and then coughed up a home run ball to Jimmie Foxx. It must have been a patented Foxx blast, for Grimes said later, "he hit it so hard I couldn't feel sorry for myself."

=== Game 6 ===
October 8, 1930 1:30 pm (ET) at Shibe Park in Philadelphia, Pennsylvania
Team	1	2	3	4	5	6	7	8	9	R	H	E
St. Louis	0	0	0	0	0	0	0	0	1	1	5	1
Philadelphia	2	0	1	2	1	1	0	0	X	7	7	0
WP: George Earnshaw (2–0) LP: Bill Hallahan (1–1); Home runs: STL: None; PHA: Al Simmons (2), Jimmy Dykes (1)

Earnshaw earned his second win on just one day of rest, pitching a five-hitter; it would be 88 years before another pitcher would start consecutive games in the postseason. Just like in Game 1, the A's seven hits came in five different innings, leading to two runs in the first and fourth innings, and single runs in the third, fifth, and sixth innings. As in Game 1, all the A's hits were extra-base hits, including home runs by Al Simmons and Jimmy Dykes.

Although the A's hit only .197 (35–for–178) in the six game set, 18 of their hits went for extra bases, outscoring the Cardinals, 21–12. St. Louis only managed a .200 batting average in the series.

The A's struck first in the first on RBI doubles by Mickey Cochrane and Bing Miller, both after walks. Simmon's home run in the third off of Syl Johnson made it 3–0 A's, then Dykes's home run after a walk in the fourth increased their lead to 5–0. The A's added to their lead next inning when Jimmie Foxx hit a leadoff double, moved to third on a bunt groundout and scored on Mule Haas's sacrifice fly. the A's scored their last run of the game in the sixth off of Jim Lindsey on Cochrane's sacrifice fly. The Cardinals scored their only run of the game on Chick Hafey's RBI double in the ninth.

== Composite line score ==
1930 World Series (4–2): Philadelphia Athletics (A.L.) over St. Louis Cardinals (N.L.)

Team	1	2	3	4	5	6	7	8	9	R	H	E
Philadelphia Athletics	5	1	3	5	1	2	1	1	2	21	35	3
St. Louis Cardinals	0	1	3	3	1	0	2	1	1	12	38	5
Total attendance: 212,619 Average attendance: 35,437; Winning player's share: $5,038 Losing player's share: $3,537
