= 1931 World Series =

1931 Major League Baseball championship series

Team (Wins)	Managers	Season
St. Louis Cardinals (4)	Gabby Street	101–53, .656, GA: 13
Philadelphia Athletics (3)	Connie Mack	107–45, .704, GA: 13 1/2
- Dates: October 1–10
- Venue(s): Sportsman's Park (St. Louis); Shibe Park (Philadelphia)
- Umpires: Bill Klem (NL), Dick Nallin (AL); Dolly Stark (NL), Bill McGowan (AL)
- Hall of Famers: Umpire: Bill Klem; Cardinals: Jim Bottomley; Frankie Frisch; Burleigh Grimes; Chick Hafey; Jesse Haines (DNP); Athletics: Connie Mack (mgr.); Mickey Cochrane; Jimmie Foxx; Lefty Grove; Waite Hoyt; Al Simmons

Broadcast
- Radio: NBC; CBS
- Radio announcers: NBC: Graham McNamee; Tom Manning; George Hicks; CBS: Ted Husing

The 1931 World Series featured the two-time defending champion Philadelphia Athletics and the St. Louis Cardinals. The Cardinals beat the Athletics in seven games, a rematch and reversal of fortunes of the previous World Series.

The same two teams faced off during the 1930 World Series and the Athletics were victorious. The only day-to-day player in the Cardinals' lineup who was different in 1931 was the "Wild Horse of the Osage", Pepper Martin—a 27-year-old rookie who had spent seven seasons in the minor leagues. He led his team for the Series in runs scored, hits, doubles, runs batted in and stolen bases, and also made a running catch to stifle a ninth-inning rally by the A's in the final game.

The spitball pitch had been banned by Major League Baseball in 1920, but those still using it at that time were "grandfathered", or permitted to keep throwing it for the balance of their big-league careers. One of those who "wet his pill" still active in 1931 was Burleigh Grimes, with two Series starts, two wins and seven innings of no-hit pitching in Game 3. "Wild" Bill Hallahan started and won the other two for the Cards, and saved Game 7.

The Athletics had captured their third straight American League pennant, winning 107 games (and 313 from 1929–31). But this would prove to be the final World Series for longtime A's manager Connie Mack. As he did after the Boston "Miracle Braves" swept his heavily favored A's in the 1914 Series, Mack would break up this great team by selling off his best players, this time out of perceived economic necessity rather than pique and competition from the short-lived Federal League. It would be the A's last World Series appearance in Philadelphia and it would be 41 years—and two cities—later before the A's would return to the Fall Classic, after their successive moves to Kansas City in 1955 and Oakland in 1968. This would also be the city of Philadelphia's last appearance in the Series until 1950, and as of 2023 the only Series involving a Philadelphia team to last seven games. It was also the last World Series until the 2017 edition in which both teams who had won at least 100 games in the regular season went the maximum seven games.

This was the first World Series to feature a team with numbers on the back of the uniform (Philadelphia).

== Summary ==
NL St. Louis Cardinals (4) vs. AL Philadelphia Athletics (3)

Game	Date	Score	Location	Time	Attendance
1	October 1	Philadelphia Athletics – 6, St. Louis Cardinals – 2	Sportsman's Park	1:55	38,529
2	October 2	Philadelphia Athletics – 0, St. Louis Cardinals – 2	Sportsman's Park	1:49	35,947
3	October 5	St. Louis Cardinals – 5, Philadelphia Athletics – 2	Shibe Park	2:10	32,295
4	October 6	St. Louis Cardinals – 0, Philadelphia Athletics – 3	Shibe Park	1:58	32,295
5	October 7	St. Louis Cardinals – 5, Philadelphia Athletics – 1	Shibe Park	1:56	32,295
6	October 9	Philadelphia Athletics – 8, St. Louis Cardinals – 1	Sportsman's Park	1:57	39,401
7	October 10	Philadelphia Athletics – 2, St. Louis Cardinals – 4	Sportsman's Park	1:57	20,805

== Matchups ==
=== Game 1 ===
October 1, 1931 1:30 pm (CT) at Sportsman's Park in St. Louis, Missouri
Team	1	2	3	4	5	6	7	8	9	R	H	E
Philadelphia	0	0	4	0	0	0	2	0	0	6	11	0
St. Louis	2	0	0	0	0	0	0	0	0	2	12	0
WP: Lefty Grove (1–0) LP: Paul Derringer (0–1); Home runs: PHA: Al Simmons (1); STL: None

The A's scored four runs in the third, enabling Lefty Grove to win Game 1 despite giving up 12 hits, three by Pepper Martin. The Cardinals struck first in the first inning on three consecutive one-out singles, the last of which to Jim Bottomley scoring a run. After a strikeout, Martin's double scored another run. In the top of the third with runners on first and second, Mule Haas's double scored Philadelphia's first run. Two consecutive walks by Paul Derringer loaded the bases and tied the game, then Jimmie Foxx's single scored two more runs. In the top of the seventh, Al Simmons's two-run home run put Philadelphia up 6–2, the game's final.

=== Game 2 ===
October 2, 1931 1:30 pm (CT) at Sportsman's Park in St. Louis, Missouri
Team	1	2	3	4	5	6	7	8	9	R	H	E
Philadelphia	0	0	0	0	0	0	0	0	0	0	3	0
St. Louis	0	1	0	0	0	0	1	0	X	2	6	1
WP: Bill Hallahan (1–0) LP: George Earnshaw (0–1)

Pepper Martin's two hits and two stolen bases, scoring both Cardinal runs, supported Hallahan's three-hit shutout. The Cardinals scored the game's first run in the second when Pepper Martin doubled off George Earnshaw, stole third and scored on Jimmy Wilson's sacrifice fly, and the game's second run in the seventh when Martin hit a leadoff single, stole second, moved to third on a groundout and scored on Charlie Gelbert's fielder's choice.

=== Game 3 ===
October 5, 1931 1:30 pm (ET) at Shibe Park in Philadelphia, Pennsylvania
Team	1	2	3	4	5	6	7	8	9	R	H	E
St. Louis	0	2	0	2	0	0	0	0	1	5	12	0
Philadelphia	0	0	0	0	0	0	0	0	2	2	2	0
WP: Burleigh Grimes (1–0) LP: Lefty Grove (1–1); Home runs: STL: None; PHA: Al Simmons (2)

Grimes pitched a two-hitter and contributed a two-run single in the fourth. He had a shutout until Al Simmons hit a two-run homer with two outs in the ninth. St. Louis struck first in the second when with runners on first and third via a walk and single, Jimmie Wilson's single and Charlie Gelbert's lineout scored a run each. They added to their lead in the fourth off Lefty Grove on Burleigh Grimes's two-run single with runners on second and third, and added another run in the ninth off Roy Mahaffey on Jim Bottomley's double.

=== Game 4 ===
October 6, 1931 1:30 pm (ET) at Shibe Park in Philadelphia, Pennsylvania
Team	1	2	3	4	5	6	7	8	9	R	H	E
St. Louis	0	0	0	0	0	0	0	0	0	0	2	1
Philadelphia	1	0	0	0	0	2	0	0	X	3	10	0
WP: George Earnshaw (1–1) LP: Syl Johnson (0–1); Home runs: STL: None; PHA: Jimmie Foxx (1)

George Earnshaw pitched a brilliant two-hit shutout, walking one and striking out eight. Simmons RBI double in the first inning after a walk and two groundouts was all Earnshaw needed. Philadelphia added to their lead in the sixth off Syl Johnson on Jimmie Foxx's home run and Jimmy Dykes's single after a Bing Miller double. Martin had both Cardinal hits.

=== Game 5 ===
October 7, 1931 1:30 pm (ET) at Shibe Park in Philadelphia, Pennsylvania
Team	1	2	3	4	5	6	7	8	9	R	H	E
St. Louis	1	0	0	0	0	2	0	1	1	5	12	0
Philadelphia	0	0	0	0	0	0	1	0	0	1	9	0
WP: Bill Hallahan (2–0) LP: Waite Hoyt (0–1); Home runs: STL: Pepper Martin (1); PHA: None

Martin was a thorn in the A's side in the series, getting three hits and four RBI to lead St. Louis to a 5-1 victory. Through five games, Martin leads all regulars with a .667 (12-18) average. St. Louis struck first in the first on Pepper Martin's sacrifice fly with runners on second and third. Martin's home run after a double in the sixth made it 3–0 Cardinals. The A's scored their only run in the seventh on Bing Miller's groundout after two one-out singles. The Cardinals added to their lead in the eighth when George Watkins walked off Rube Walberg, stole second and scored on Martin's single and in the ninth off Eddie Rommel on Charlie Gelbert's single with two on.

=== Game 6 ===
October 9, 1931 1:30 pm (CT) at Sportsman's Park in St. Louis, Missouri
Team	1	2	3	4	5	6	7	8	9	R	H	E
Philadelphia	0	0	0	0	4	0	4	0	0	8	8	1
St. Louis	0	0	0	0	0	1	0	0	0	1	5	2
WP: Lefty Grove (2–1) LP: Paul Derringer (0–2)

The Athletics broke a scoreless tie with four runs in the fifth, Grove winning his second game of the series with a five-hitter, tying the series. After an error and walk off Paul Derringer, Dib Williams's RBI single scored the game's first run. Two two-out walks loaded the bases and scored another run. Mickey Cochrane's RBI single scored a run, then a walk to Al Simmons scored another. St. Louis scored their only run in the sixth when Jake Flowers doubled and scored on Frankie Frisch's single. The A's added to their lead in the seventh off Jim Lindsey. Max Bishop hit a leadoff single, moved to second on a bunt groundout, and scored on Al Simmons's single. After a single and hit-by-pitch loaded the bases, a walk to Jimmy Dykes scored a run and an error by Chick Hafey scored two more.

=== Game 7 ===
October 10, 1931 1:30 pm (CT) at Sportsman's Park in St. Louis, Missouri
Team	1	2	3	4	5	6	7	8	9	R	H	E
Philadelphia	0	0	0	0	0	0	0	0	2	2	7	1
St. Louis	2	0	2	0	0	0	0	0	X	4	5	0
WP: Burleigh Grimes (2–0) LP: George Earnshaw (1–2) Sv: Bill Hallahan (1); Home runs: PHA: None; STL: George Watkins (1)

The Cardinals struck first in the first when with runners on second and third via two single and a bunt groundout, a wild pitch by George Earnshaw to Pepper Martin scored a run and a strike three wild pitch to Ernie Orsatti scored another. A two-run home run by George Watkins in the third gave the Cardinals a 4-0 lead, but the Athletics scored two in the ninth on Doc Cramer's bases loaded two-run single, Hallahan getting the last out, saving the victory for Grimes. Despite going 0–for–6 in Games 6 and 7, Pepper Martin was the leading hitter of the series with a .500 (12–for–24) batting average.

== Composite line score ==
1931 World Series (4–3): St. Louis Cardinals (N.L.) over Philadelphia Athletics (A.L.)

Team	1	2	3	4	5	6	7	8	9	R	H	E
St. Louis Cardinals	5	3	2	2	0	3	1	1	2	19	54	4
Philadelphia Athletics	1	0	4	0	4	2	7	0	4	22	50	2
Total attendance: 231,567 Average attendance: 33,081; Winning player's share: $4,468 Losing player's share: $3,023

== Aftermath ==
This was the Athletics’ final postseason appearance during their time in Philadelphia. The team failed to win a pennant during their time in Kansas City. The Athletics would have to wait until the move to Oakland, California for their next postseason appearance, which came in 1971, where they were swept by the Baltimore Orioles in the ALCS. The Athletics would eventually win the World Series again in 1972 over the Cincinnati Reds in seven games, which marked the start of a dynasty for the team.

The Cardinals would return to the World Series three years later, where they defeated the Detroit Tigers in seven games for their third championship.
