= Narumi Stadium =

Baseball stadium in Nagoya, Japan

- Interactive map of Narumi Stadium
- Location: Nagoya, Japan
- Coordinates: 35.083342°N 136.955867°E
- Capacity: 20,000 (1927); 40,000

Construction
- Built: 1927
- Closed: 1958

Tenants
- Nagoya Kinsho Army (1936–1940); Chunichi Dragons (1948–1954)

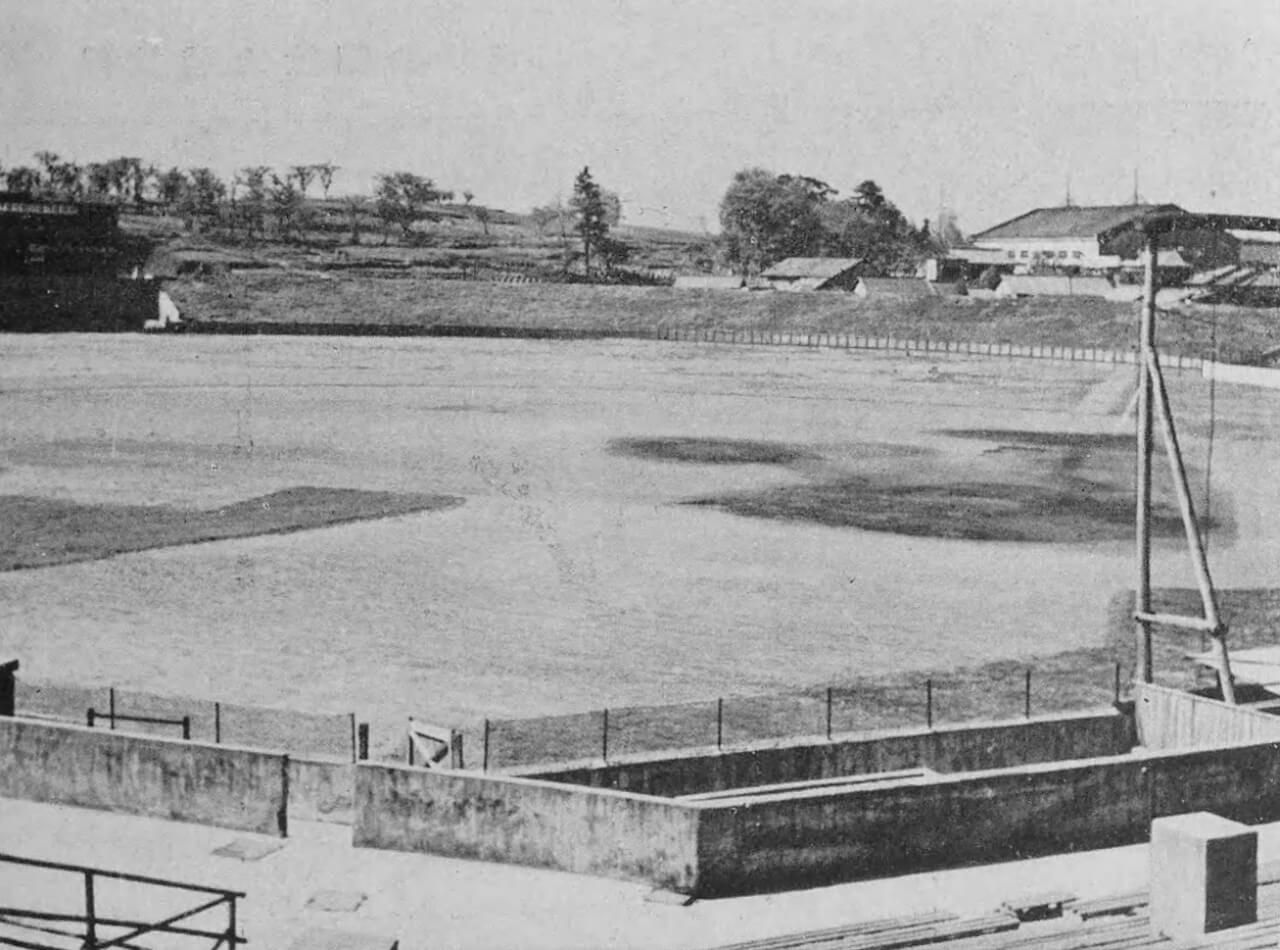
Narumi Stadium seen from the back net side.

Narumi Stadium (Japanese: 鳴海球場) was a baseball stadium in Nagoya, Japan. Narumi Stadium was one of the three stadiums which hosted the first professional season of Japanese baseball in 1936.

The stadium primarily hosted the Nagoya Kinsho Army team, but the Chunichi Dragons also occasionally used the stadium between 1948 and 1954, especially in 1953, where the team was displaced after a fire at their other stadium. Before 1952, Japanese league teams typically did not have a designated stadium, instead playing in the general area in which they were based.

== History ==
The stadium opened in 1927.

A barnstorming team of American All-Stars, including Babe Ruth, Lou Gehrig, and Jimmie Foxx played against a Japanese all-star team in the stadium on November 23, 1934. Lefty Gomez led the Americans to a 6–2 victory.

The first professional baseball game in Japan was played in the stadium on February 9, 1936.

The stadium was closed in 1958. The field has been reused as a driving school, and portions of the first and third base stands still stand today.

== Dimensions ==
The stadium's dimensions have been alternatively listed as 302 feet to left and right field and 365 feet to center or as 347 feet down the lines and 413 feet to center field.
