= 1933 Major League Baseball All-Star Game =

American exhibition baseball contest

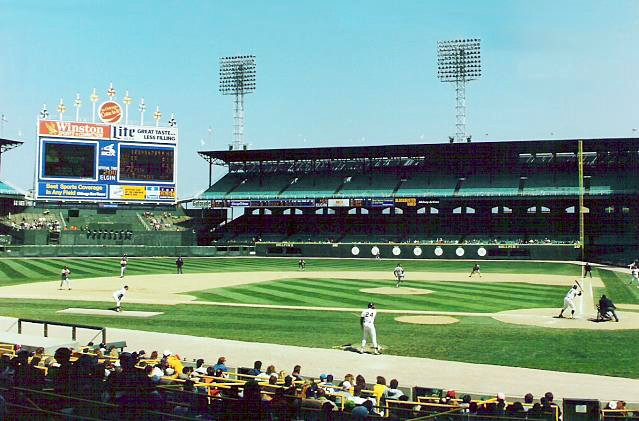
	1	2	3	4	5	6	7	8	9	R	H	E
National League	0	0	0	0	0	2	0	0	0	2	8	0
American League	0	1	2	0	0	1	0	0	0	4	9	1
- Date: July 6, 1933
- Venue: Comiskey Park
- City: Chicago, Illinois
- Managers: John McGraw (NYG); Connie Mack (PHA)
- Attendance: 47,595
- Radio: CBS; NBC
- Radio announcers: Pat Flanagan and Johnny O'Hara (CBS); Graham McNamee and Hal Totten (NBC)

The 1933 Major League Baseball All-Star Game was the first edition of the All-Star Game known as the "Midsummer Classic". This was the first official playing of the midseason exhibition baseball game between Major League Baseball's (MLB's) National League (NL) and American League (AL) All-Star teams. The game was held on July 6, 1933, at Comiskey Park in Chicago, Illinois, the home of the AL's Chicago White Sox. The game resulted in the AL defeating the NL, 4–2, in two hours and five minutes.

The first official All-Star Game came 22 years after the Addie Joss Benefit Game of July 24, 1911, when the American League's Cleveland Naps faced a team of all-stars from other American League teams at League Park in Cleveland, Ohio; the game was won by the all-star squad, 5–3.

== History ==
The first official MLB All-Star exhibition game on July 6, 1933, was held at Comiskey Park (1910–1990) and was part of the 1933 Chicago World's Fair during the city's centennial. The 1933 MLB All-Star Game was the idea of Arch Ward, the sports editor of the Chicago Tribune, after the Mayor of Chicago, Edward J. Kelly, had first approached the Tribune's publisher for a major sport event. The game was intended to be a one-time event to boost morale during the Great Depression. Ward decided that the fans would select the starting nine players and the managers the other nine players for each of the NL and AL All-Star teams. The Tribune called it the "Game of the Century", and 55 newspapers across the country printed the fans' ballots in their papers. The Tribune estimated the game's attendance on July 6, 1933, at 49,000. The proceeds ($45,000, net gate receipts) from the game went to a charity for disabled and needy major league players. The All-Star Game would afterwards be known as MLB's "Midsummer Classic".

The legendary Babe Ruth of the Yankees highlighted the game by hitting a two-run home run to right field in the bottom of the third inning and catching a fly ball up against the scoreboard in right-center field in the top of the eighth inning. Ruth was greeted at home plate by the AL/Chicago White Sox batboy John McBride and teammate Lou Gehrig. Twenty of the game's thirty-six All-Stars including Ruth would later be inducted into the National Baseball Hall of Fame at Cooperstown, New York. Both the game's managers, five out of six coaches, and two out of the four umpires on the field that day would also be future Hall of Famers. Two AL All-Stars were White Sox players, starting third baseman Jimmy Dykes and starting center fielder Al Simmons. Yankee Lefty Gomez was the winning pitcher for the American League.

The NL team wore specially made gray uniforms and navy blue caps with "National League" in navy blue felt letters on the front of the jersey, a large navy blue felt number on the back and "NL" in white letters printed on the navy caps. The AL team members each wore their home uniform. The NL members were allowed to keep their All-Star uniforms and caps. In 1934, each NL member used their home uniform and cap.

The game's official AL baseball was changed to an official NL baseball and the AL home plate umpire was replaced by a NL home plate umpire after the top of the 5th inning. 60 baseballs autographed by All-Star players were given out before the game started.

== 1933 All-Star Game rosters ==
Personnel in italics have since been inducted into the National Baseball Hall of Fame.

=== National League ===
Starters
Position	Player	Team	All-Star Games
P	Bill Hallahan	Cardinals	1
C	Jimmie Wilson	Cardinals	1
1B	Bill Terry	Giants	1
2B	Frankie Frisch	Cardinals	1
3B	Pepper Martin	Cardinals	1
SS	Dick Bartell	Phillies	1
LF	Chick Hafey	Reds	1
CF	Wally Berger	Braves	1
RF	Chuck Klein	Phillies	1

Pitchers
Position	Player	Team	All-Star Games
P	Carl Hubbell	Giants	1
P	Hal Schumacher	Giants	1
P	Lon Warneke	Cubs	1

Reserves
Position	Player	Team	All-Star Games
C	Gabby Hartnett	Cubs	1
2B	Tony Cuccinello	Dodgers	1
3B	Pie Traynor	Pirates	1
SS	Woody English	Cubs	1
OF	Lefty O'Doul	Giants	1
OF	Paul Waner	Pirates	1

Coaches
Position	Player	Team	All-Star Games
Manager	John McGraw	Giants	1
Coach	Bill McKechnie	Braves	1
Coach	Max Carey	Dodgers	1

=== American League ===
Starters
Position	Player	Team	All-Star Games
P	Lefty Gomez	Yankees	1
C	Rick Ferrell	Red Sox	1
1B	Lou Gehrig	Yankees	1
2B	Charlie Gehringer	Tigers	1
3B	Jimmy Dykes	White Sox	1
SS	Joe Cronin	Senators	1
LF	Ben Chapman	Yankees	1
CF	Al Simmons	White Sox	1
RF	Babe Ruth	Yankees	1

Pitchers
Position	Player	Team	All-Star Games
P	General Crowder	Senators	1
P	Wes Ferrell	Indians	1
P	Lefty Grove	Athletics	1
P	Oral Hildebrand	Indians	1

Reserves
Position	Player	Team	All-Star Games
C	Bill Dickey	Yankees	1
1B	Jimmie Foxx	Athletics	1
2B	Tony Lazzeri	Yankees	1
OF	Earl Averill	Indians	1
OF	Sam West	Browns	1

Coaches
Position	Player	Team	All-Star Games
Manager	Connie Mack	Athletics	1
Coach	Eddie Collins	Red Sox	1
Coach	Art Fletcher	Yankees	1

== 1933 All-Star Game ==
=== Umpires ===
Position	Umpire	League
Home Plate	Bill Dinneen	American
First Base	Bill Klem	National
Second Base	Bill McGowan	American
Third Base	Cy Rigler	National

The umpires rotated positions clockwise in the middle of the fifth inning, with Klem moving behind the plate.

=== Starting lineups ===
National League				American League			
Order	Player	Team	Position	Order	Player	Team	Position
1	Pepper Martin	St. Louis	3B	1	Ben Chapman	New York	LF
2	Frankie Frisch	St. Louis	2B	2	Charlie Gehringer	Detroit	2B
3	Chuck Klein	Philadelphia	RF	3	Babe Ruth	New York	RF
4	Chick Hafey	Cincinnati	LF	4	Lou Gehrig	New York	1B
5	Bill Terry	New York	1B	5	Al Simmons	Chicago	CF
6	Wally Berger	Boston	CF	6	Jimmy Dykes	Chicago	3B
7	Dick Bartell	Philadelphia	SS	7	Joe Cronin	Washington	SS
8	Jimmie Wilson	St. Louis	C	8	Rick Ferrell	Boston	C
9	Bill Hallahan	St. Louis	P	9	Lefty Gomez	New York	P

=== Game summary ===
Thursday, July 6, 1933 1:15 pm (CT) at Comiskey Park in Chicago, Illinois
Team	1	2	3	4	5	6	7	8	9	R	H	E
National League	0	0	0	0	0	2	0	0	0	2	8	0
American League	0	1	2	0	0	1	0	0	x	4	9	1
WP: Lefty Gomez (1–0) LP: Bill Hallahan (0–1); Home runs: NL: Frankie Frisch (1); AL: Babe Ruth (1)

Chick Hafey of the National League had the first hit, a bloop single to center field to lead off the second inning. The American League got on the board first in the bottom of the second. NL pitcher Bill Hallahan issued one-out walks to Jimmy Dykes and Joe Cronin. Two batters later, the game's winning pitcher Lefty Gomez, singled home Dykes for the AL's first run.

In the bottom of the third, after a walk to Charlie Gehringer, Babe Ruth famously hit the first home run in All-Star Game history, putting the AL up 3–0. Hallahan was chased from the game after walking Lou Gehrig immediately afterward, and was replaced by Lon Warneke. General Crowder replaced Gomez to start the fourth inning. In the sixth, Warneke hit a one-out triple and scored on a Pepper Martin groundout. Frankie Frisch followed with a home run to bring the NL to within a run, but after a Chuck Klein single, Crowder would escape the inning without giving up any more damage.

Cronin led off the bottom of the sixth with a single. After advancing on a bunt, he scored on an Earl Averill single to extend the lead to 4–2. Crowder would be replaced by Lefty Grove in the top of the seventh, while Warneke was replaced by Carl Hubbell in the bottom of the inning. The NL looked to have a chance in the top of the eighth. With Frisch on first with two outs, Hafey lined a shot to right field that looked like it could be a home run, but Ruth reached over the wall to catch it, denying the NL a chance to tie the game. Grove retired the side in order in the ninth to secure the American League's victory.
