= Pepper Martin =

American baseball player (1904–1965)

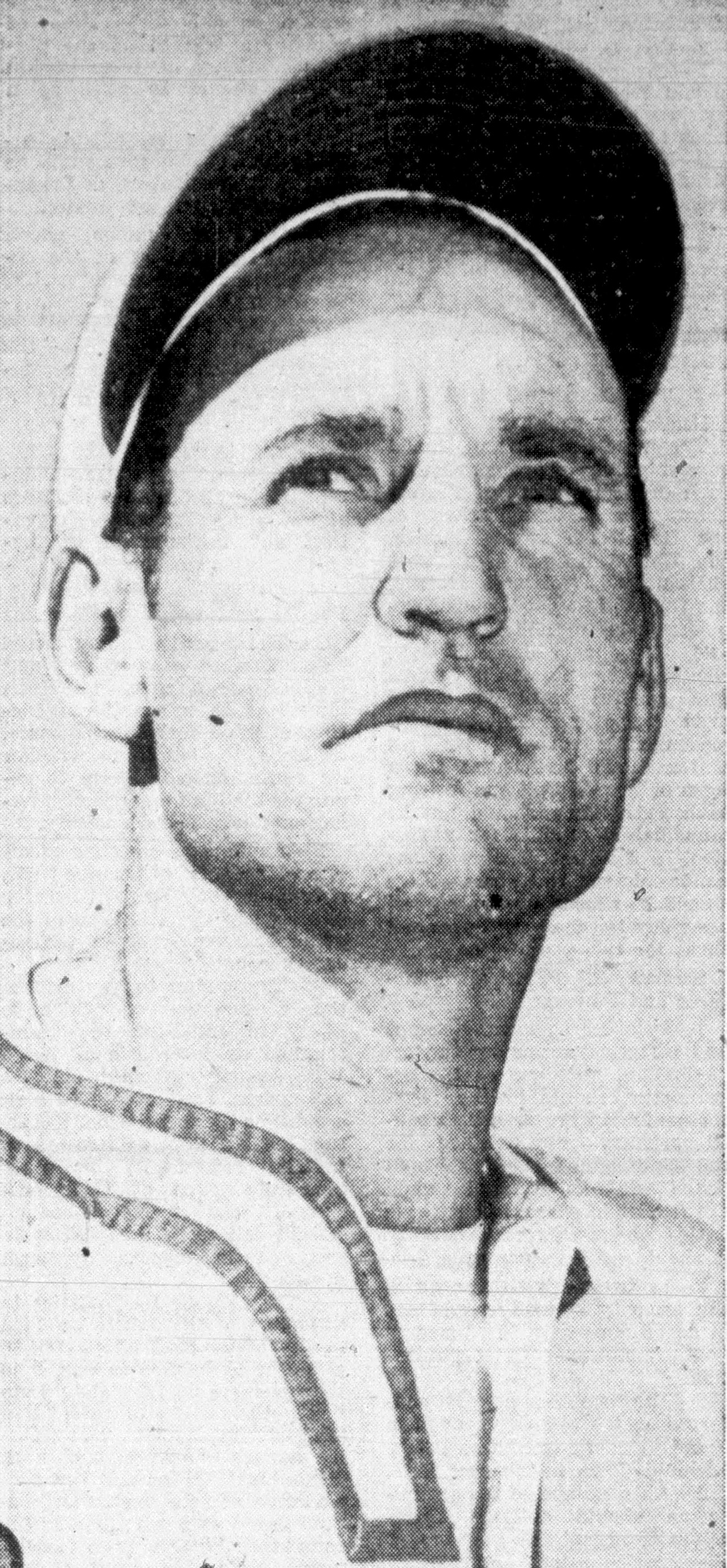
- Martin, circa 1942
- Outfielder / Third baseman
- Born: February 29, 1904; Temple, Oklahoma, U.S.
- Died: March 5, 1965 (aged 61); McAlester, Oklahoma, U.S.
- Batted: Right Threw: Right

MLB debut
- April 16, 1928, for the St. Louis Cardinals

Last MLB appearance
- October 4, 1944, for the St. Louis Cardinals

MLB statistics
- Batting average: .298
- Home runs: 59
- Runs batted in: 501
- Stats at Baseball Reference

Teams
- St. Louis Cardinals (1928, 1930–1940, 1944)

Career highlights and awards
- 4× All-Star (1933–1935, 1937); 2× World Series champion (1931, 1934); 3× NL stolen base leader (1933, 1934, 1936); St. Louis Cardinals Hall of Fame

Johnny Leonard Roosevelt "Pepper" Martin (February 29, 1904 – March 5, 1965) was an American professional baseball outfielder, third baseman, and minor league manager. He played 13 seasons in Major League Baseball (MLB) for the St. Louis Cardinals from 1928 to 1944. He was best known for his heroics during the 1931 World Series, in which he was the catalyst in a Cardinals' upset victory over the Philadelphia Athletics. Martin was known as the "Wild Horse of the Osage" because of his daring, aggressive baserunning.

Martin was an integral member of the Cardinals' teams of the 1930s that became known as the Gashouse Gang for their roguish behavior and practical jokes. Early in his career, he was labeled by some contemporary press reports as the next Ty Cobb because of his spirited, hustling style of play. However, because his headlong attitude on the playing field took a physical toll on his body, he never lived up to those initial expectations. After the end of his playing career, he continued his career in baseball as a successful minor league baseball manager. In 2017, Martin was inducted into the St. Louis Cardinals Hall of Fame.

== Baseball career ==
=== Early career ===
Born in Temple, Oklahoma, Martin moved to Oklahoma City with his parents at the age of six where he grew up playing baseball. At 19, he began his professional career when he signed to play as a shortstop in the Oklahoma State League for a team in Guthrie, Oklahoma. When the league folded in 1924, his contract was sold to the Greenville Hunters of the East Texas League. In 1925, he posted a .340 batting average in 98 games for the Hunters and his contract was acquired by the St. Louis Cardinals to play for their Western Association affiliate, the Fort Smith Twins. He continued to post batting averages above the .300 mark. In 1927, Martin hit for a .306 average in 147 games with the Houston Buffaloes, earning him a promotion to the major leagues.

After spending five years in the minor leagues, Martin made his major league debut with the Cardinals on April 16, 1928 at the age of 24. He posted a .308 batting average in 39 games as a utility player, helping the Cardinals win the National League pennant. Martin made one appearance as a pinch runner in the 1928 World Series, which the Cardinals lost in four consecutive games to the New York Yankees. Despite his respectable batting average, Martin was sent back to Houston in January 1929, where he hit for a .298 batting average. The following season, he was promoted to the Rochester Red Wings where his offensive statistics improved with 20 home runs, a .363 batting average, and a .631 slugging percentage, helping the Red Wings win the 1930 International League title. The Red Wings then defeated the Louisville Colonels of the American Association to win the Junior World Series.

Martin's performance earned him a return to the major leagues with the Cardinals in 1931. When veteran center fielder Taylor Douthit went into a hitting slump, Martin replaced him and played well enough that Cardinals president, Branch Rickey traded Douthit to the Cincinnati Reds in June. Martin impressed observers with his hustle in the outfield as well as on the base paths, where he often slid into bases head-first. He ended the year with a .300 batting average along with seven home runs and 75 runs batted in to help the Cardinals clinch the 1931 National League pennant by 13 games over the New York Giants.

=== World Series star ===
The 1931 World Series was a rematch of the previous year's participants, pitting the Cardinals against the Philadelphia Athletics. Led by Connie Mack, the Athletics had won the previous two World Series and were heavily favored to win for a third consecutive year.

In Game 1 held at Sportsman's Park in St. Louis, Martin had three hits, including a double, a stolen base and drove in one run in a 6–2 loss to the ace of the Athletics staff, 31-game winning pitcher Lefty Grove. Martin proved to be the difference in Game 2 in what was otherwise a tight pitching duel between Bill Hallahan of the Cardinals and George Earnshaw for the Athletics. Martin scored the first run of the game in the second inning by stretching a single into a double when the ball was mishandled in the outfield, stealing third base, and then scoring on a sacrifice fly. Martin added another run in the seventh inning when he hit a single, stole second base, took third base on a fielder's choice, and then scored on a squeeze bunt. Those would be the only runs of the game as Hallahan pitched a three-hit shutout to even the series, 1–1.

The series moved to Shibe Park in Philadelphia for Game 3, where Martin had two hits, including a double, and scored twice in a 5–2 Cardinals' victory over Grove. In Game 4, he produced the only two hits by the Cardinals as they lost to Earnshaw, 3–0. Martin almost single-handedly provided the offense for the Cardinals in Game 5, driving in four runs with two singles, a home run and a sacrifice fly, as the Cardinals triumphed 5–1. Although he was held hitless in the final two games of the series, he made an impressive catch to extinguish an Athletics two-run rally in the ninth inning of Game 7 to end the game and clinch the world championship for the Cardinals.

Martin had a then-record 12 hits in the series, including four doubles, a home run, five stolen bases, and five runs batted in. Martin's .500 series batting average may have made the difference in the series outcome, as without him the Cardinals batted just .205 as a team. During the series, Martin was asked how he had learned to run so fast; he replied, "I grew up in Oklahoma, and once you start runnin' out there there ain't nothin' to stop you." Hall of Fame manager John McGraw described Martin's performance as "the greatest individual performance in the history of the World Series". In December, he was selected as the inaugural male athlete of the year by the Associated Press.

=== Later career ===
Martin experienced an injury-plagued season in 1932, missing several weeks when he dislocated his shoulder in April and missed a month and a half when he broke a finger in July while sliding into home plate. In August, Cardinals manager Gabby Street moved Martin to third base to fill the gap left by the injured Sparky Adams. Martin was not a naturally gifted third baseman, often fielding balls after having stopped them with his chest. He ended the season with a .238 batting average with four home runs and 34 runs batted in as the Cardinals fell to seventh place in the National League.

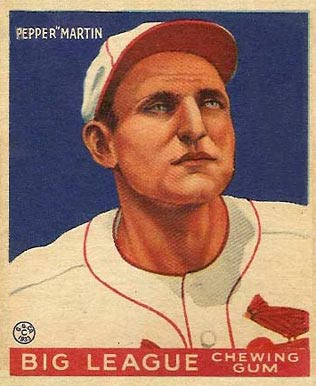
Martin depicted on a 1933 Goudey trading card.

Having rebounded from his injuries, in 1933 Martin was leading the league in hitting with a .363 batting average in the middle of June, earning him a starting role as the third baseman for the National League team in the inaugural Major League Baseball All-Star Game held on July 6, 1933. Now hitting as the Cardinals' leadoff hitter, he finished the season ranked sixth in the league with a career-high .316 average and led the league with 122 runs scored and 26 stolen bases. Martin ranked tenth in the league with a .456 slugging percentage, and he had a career-high .387 on-base percentage along with 36 doubles, 12 triples and eight home runs as the Cardinals improved to a fifth-place finish. He came in fifth place in the voting results for the 1933 National League Most Valuable Player Award.

Martin's batting average dropped to .289 in 1934, and he once again led the league in stolen bases as the Cardinals rallied from seven games behind the New York Giants in early September to win the National League pennant on the last day of the season. He made an appearance as a relief pitcher on August 19, allowing one hit in two innings pitched. In a memorable 1934 World Series against the Detroit Tigers, the Cardinals were down 3 games to 2, before rebounding to win the final two games. The series was highlighted by several rough plays on the base paths that culminated in Game 7, when Joe Medwick made a rough slide into Tigers' third baseman Marv Owen. The following inning, outraged Detroit fans pelted Medwick with debris when he assumed his defensive position in the outfield. The disturbance wasn't quelled until the umpires appealed to baseball commissioner Kenesaw Mountain Landis, who had Medwick removed from the game. Martin ended the series with 11 hits for a .355 average, stole two bases and scored eight runs in the series. He experienced difficulties in the field, committing 3 errors in Game 4 and setting a World Series record with four errors overall. While in a St. Louis hospital in December 1934, for a minor operation on his left arm, Martin insisted that he be entertained by a cowboy musical group that he had hired. He created such a disturbance among the other patients that the hospital staff moved him to an isolated wing. Martin, along with Cardinals teammates such as Leo Durocher, Dizzy Dean and Joe Medwick among others, became known as the 1934 Gashouse Gang due to their boisterous activities on and off the field. He played the guitar in a hillbilly band composed of Cardinals players named The Mudcat Band.

Although Martin had a good year offensively in 1935, he continued to struggle defensively at third base. In the midst of a tight pennant race in July, he committed three costly errors in a loss to the Giants and ended the year with 30 errors. He was hitting for .333 by mid-season to earn the starting third baseman's position in the 1935 All-Star Game. For the season, he hit for a .299 average with nine home runs and 54 runs batted in. In October, Martin underwent surgery again, this time on his right arm. In January 1936, Branch Rickey asked Martin to curtail his extra-curricular activities. Already well known as a hunting and fishing enthusiast, Martin had taken up the hobby of midget car racing and was also playing in football and basketball games during the winter months. He also became the vice-president and general manager of an Oklahoma City ice hockey team.

Martin moved back to the outfield, playing as the Cardinals' right fielder in 1936 as the Cardinals battled the New York Giants for the National League title before settling for second place. He responded with a good year offensively, hitting for a .309 average with career-highs in home runs (11) and in runs batted in (76). Martin also again led the league in stolen bases with 23. He continued to hit well by 1937, although he was relegated to a part-time role, as his spirited, headlong style of play took its toll on his body. At the beginning of the 1939 season, he was named as the Cardinals' team captain, taking the job from Leo Durocher, who had been traded to the Brooklyn Dodgers. He experienced a resurgence, leading the team with a .340 batting average in June before a sprained wrist put him out of action for two weeks. He ended the season with a .306 batting average in 88 games, helping the Cardinals to finish second in the National League. Martin hit for a respectable .316 average in 1940 before the Cardinals named him as the player-manager of the Sacramento Solons of the Pacific Coast League in October.

Martin led Sacramento to a second-place finish in 1941 before leading them to their first Pacific Coast League championship in 38 years in 1942. He then became a player-manager for the Rochester Red Wings in 1943. When professional baseball experienced a shortage of players during World War II, Martin returned to the major leagues in 1944 with the Cardinals at the age of 40. In 40 games with the Cardinals, he posted a .279 batting average and an impressive .386 on-base percentage to help the Cardinals clinch the 1944 National League pennant. Martin did not appear in the 1944 World Series, playing his final major league game on October 1, 1944.

== Career statistics ==
In a 13-year major league career, Martin played in 1,189 games, accumulating 1,227 hits in 4,117 at bats for a .298 career batting average along with 756 runs, 270 doubles, 75 triples, .443 slugging percentage, 59 home runs, 501 runs batted in, 146 stolen bases, 369 bases on balls and an on-base percentage of .358. He retired with a .973 career fielding percentage in 613 games as an outfielder and a .927 fielding percentage in 429 games as a third baseman. A four-time All-Star, Martin's World Series career batting average of .418 (23-for-55) is still a series record, and he is tied for 10th with seven World Series stolen bases. He led the National League three times in stolen bases and once in runs scored. On May 5, 1933, Martin hit for the cycle in a game against the Philadelphia Phillies at the Baker Bowl.

== Managerial career ==
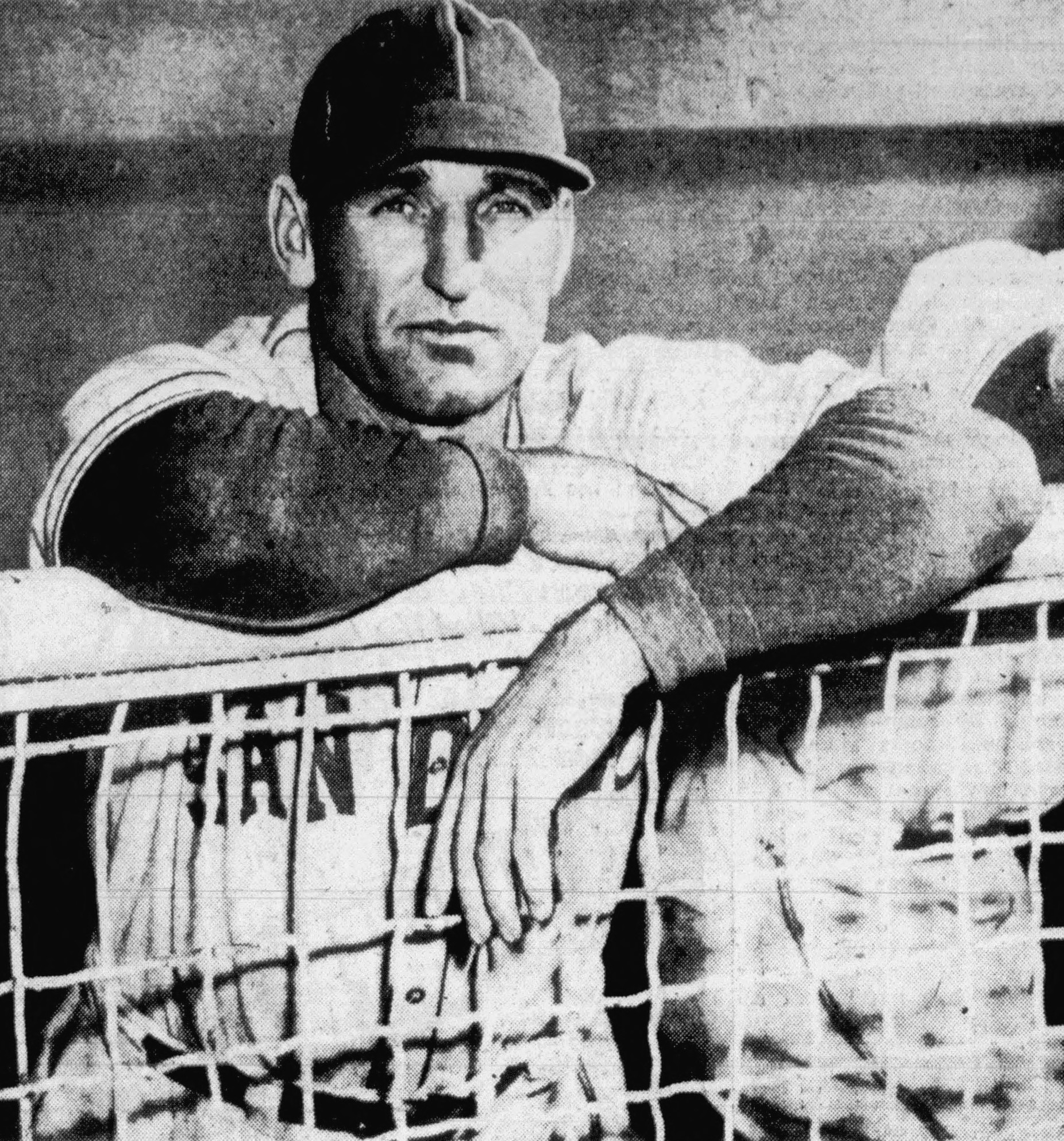
Martin during his time as player-manager of the San Diego Padres of the Pacific Coast League.

After the end of his major league career, Martin returned to the minor leagues, serving as a player-manager with the San Diego Padres of the Pacific Coast League in 1945 and 1946 before becoming the player-manager for the Greenville Spinners of the South Atlantic League in 1947. His fiery, competitive nature was still evident in July 1945 when it was reported that he had punched one of his players for not performing to his standards. While managing the Miami Sun Sox of the Florida International League in 1949, he was fined and suspended for the remainder of the season for choking an umpire. In August 1951, he made news again when he was arrested after a Sun Sox game when he went into the stands to punch a spectator in Lakeland, Florida.

When the Sun Sox released him, Martin was hired to manage the Miami Beach Flamingos of the Florida International League in 1952. Despite leading them to a 103–49 record, the Flamingos finished the season one game behind his former team, the Sun Sox. In 1953, he became the manager of the Fort Lauderdale Lions and led them to the Florida International League title. After spending the 1954 season as the manager for the Portsmouth Merrimacs, Martin was named as a coach for the Chicago Cubs in September 1955. Stan Hack was fired as the Cubs manager when they finished in last place in the 1956 season, and the new Cubs manager, Bob Scheffing, asked for Martin's resignation along with the rest of the coaching staff. Martin returned to the minor leagues once again where he became a player-coach for the Tulsa Oilers, playing his final game at the age of 54. He took his final field assignment as the manager of the Miami Marlins in 1959.

== Later life ==
Before his death, Martin served briefly as the athletic director of the Oklahoma State Penitentiary at McAlester, Oklahoma. He died on March 5, 1965, after suffering a heart attack. His wife, Ruby, survived him by over four decades, dying just after her 99th birthday in 2009.

Martin was inducted into the Oklahoma Sports Hall of Fame in 1992 and was enshrined into the St. Louis Cardinals Hall of Fame in 2017.

== See also ==
- List of Major League Baseball players to hit for the cycle
- List of Major League Baseball annual runs scored leaders
- List of Major League Baseball annual stolen base leaders
- List of Major League Baseball players who spent their entire career with one franchise

== Sources ==
- Barthel, Thomas (2003). Pepper Martin: A Baseball Biography. McFarland & Company. ISBN 978-0786416028.

Achievements
Preceded by Mickey Cochrane	Hitting for the cycle May 5, 1933	Succeeded by Chuck Klein
