= Gabby Street =

American baseball player, manager, and broadcaster (1882–1951)

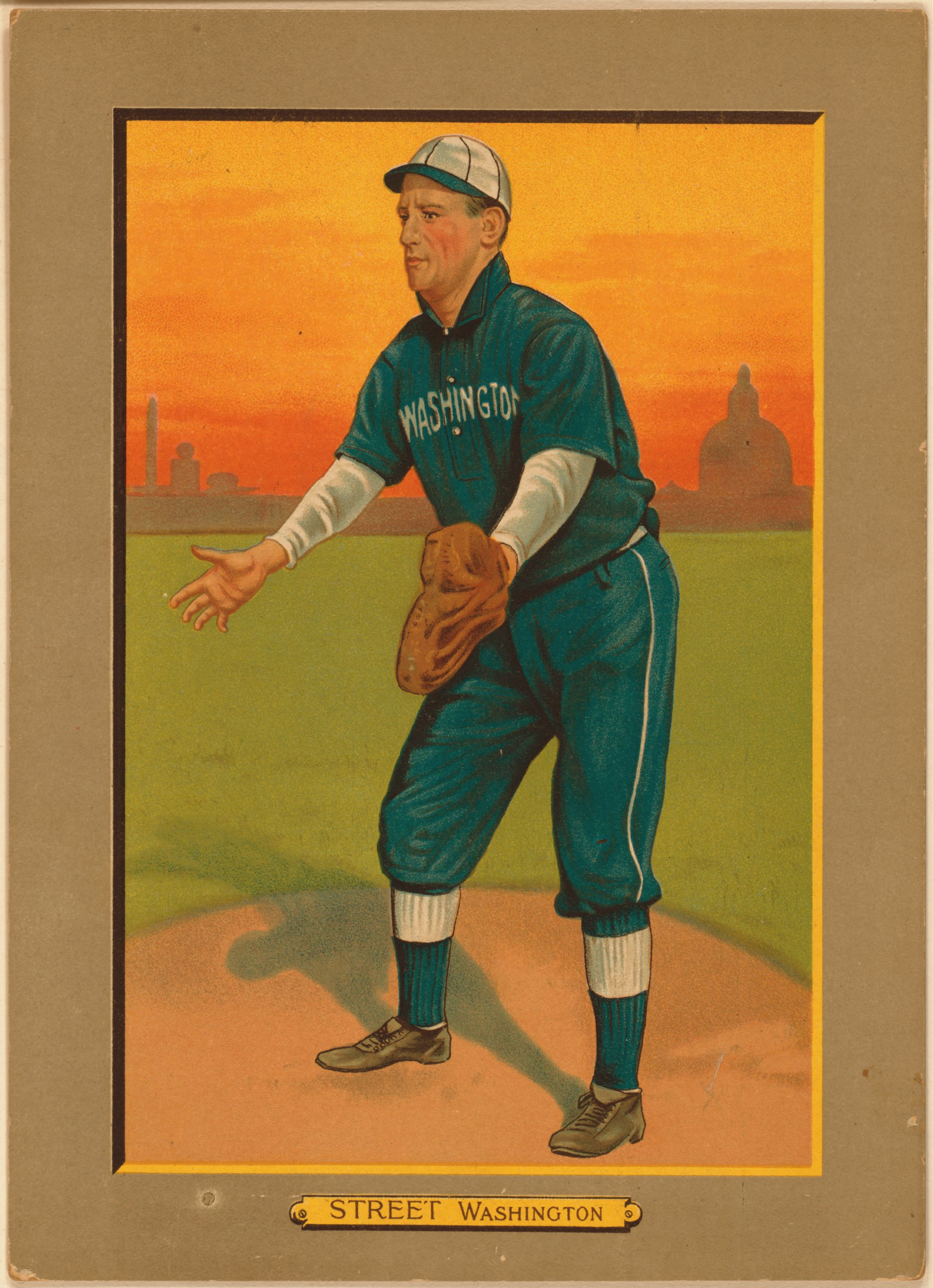
- Street baseball card
- Catcher / Manager
- Born: September 30, 1882; Huntsville, Alabama, U.S.
- Died: February 6, 1951 (aged 68); Joplin, Missouri, U.S.
- Batted: Right Threw: Right

MLB debut
- September 13, 1904, for the Cincinnati Reds

Last MLB appearance
- September 20, 1931, for the St. Louis Cardinals

MLB statistics
- Batting average: .208
- Home runs: 2
- Runs batted in: 105
- Managerial record: 365–332
- Winning %: .524
- Stats at Baseball Reference

Teams
- As player: Cincinnati Reds (1904–1905); Boston Beaneaters (1905); Cincinnati Reds (1905); Washington Senators (1908–1911); New York Highlanders (1912); St. Louis Cardinals (1931); As manager: St. Louis Cardinals (1929, 1930–1933); Mission Reds (1934–1935); St. Louis Browns (1938)

Career highlights and awards
- World Series champion (1931)

Charles Evard "Gabby" Street (September 30, 1882 – February 6, 1951), also nicknamed "the Old Sarge", was an American catcher, manager, coach, and radio broadcaster in Major League Baseball during the first half of the 20th century. As a catcher, he participated in one of the most publicized baseball stunts of the century's first decade. As a manager, he led the St. Louis Cardinals to two National League championships (1930–31) and one world title (1931). As a broadcaster, he entertained St. Louis baseball fans in the years following World War II.

== Biography ==
Born in Huntsville, Alabama, Street (who batted and threw right-handed) was a weak hitter. He batted only .208 in a seven-year playing career (1904–05; 1908–12) in 502 games with the Cincinnati Reds, Boston Beaneaters, Washington Senators, and New York Highlanders. Apart from 1908 to 1909, when he was the Senators' first-string catcher, he was a part-time player.

On August 21, 1908, Street achieved a measure of immortality by catching a baseball dropped from the top of the Washington Monument—a distance of 555 feet (169 m). After muffing the first 12 balls thrown by journalist Preston Gibson, he made a clean reception of number 13. In addition, Street was fabled as an early catcher and mentor of the American League's nonpareil right-handed pitcher, Walter Johnson.

After Street's playing career ended, he managed in the minor leagues before joining the Cardinals' major league coaching staff in 1929. It was a year of turmoil for the defending NL champs. They replaced 1928 skipper Bill McKechnie before the season with Billy Southworth; then, when Southworth couldn't get results, they brought back McKechnie on July 24. In between, Street served as acting manager for one game on July 23: an 8–2 triumph over the Philadelphia Phillies. At the close of the 1929 season, McKechnie left to manage the Boston Braves and Street became the Redbirds' full-fledged manager.

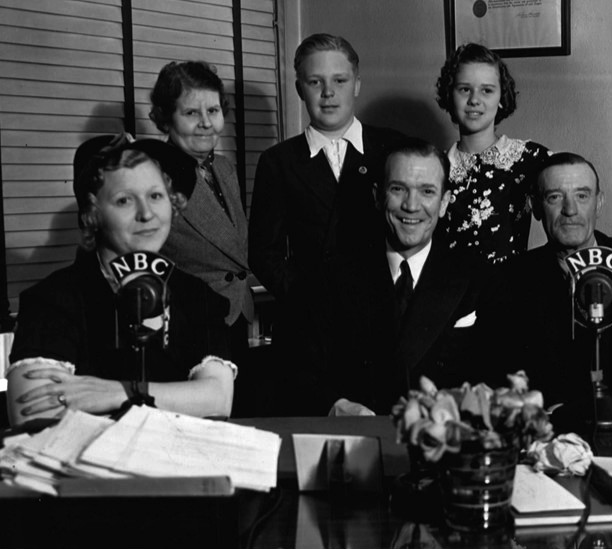
Street (seated right) circa 1930s

1931 Metropolitan Studios (W754) card of Street

The Old Sarge promptly led the Cardinals to consecutive National League pennants. In 1930, they won 92 games and finished two games in front of the Chicago Cubs. But in the 1930 World Series, they faced the defending world champion Philadelphia Athletics and lost in six games. In 1931, Street's Cardinals won 101 games and bested the New York Giants by 13 games. Then, in the 1931 Series against those same A's, pitchers Wild Bill Hallahan and Burleigh Grimes dominated and Pepper Martin had 12 hits, batted .500, drove in five runs and stole five bases to lead the underdog Redbirds to a seven-game world championship against the last Connie Mack dynasty.

The Cardinals faltered in 1932, winning only 72 games and finishing tied for sixth, 18 games out, and had improved only to fifth in July 1933. Street was dumped on July 23 and replaced by his second baseman, Frankie Frisch. The next two seasons, he managed the Mission Reds, but in 1935 he was suspended from the Pacific Coast League indefinitely for assaulting an umpire. After that, he managed the St. Paul Saints of the American Association in 1936 and 1937, before returning to the Mound City as skipper of the 1938 St. Louis Browns. The habitually bottom-feeding Brownies finished seventh in an eight-team American League, winning only 53 games. The '38 season put a cap on Street's major league managerial career. In all or parts of six years, he won 365 and lost 332 (.524).

Street would return to St. Louis and the major leagues, however, as a color commentator for Cardinals and Browns radio broadcasts after the Second World War, working with young colleague Harry Caray. After battling cancer successfully in 1949, Street fell victim to heart failure in his adopted hometown of Joplin, Missouri, in February 1951. He died at 68 years of age.

...no (broadcast) partner I've ever had meant as much to me as he did. ... I listened to Gabby and learned, and not only about baseball; I learned many of the most important lessons about life.

— Harry Caray, from Harry Caray, Holy Cow!, p. 71.

Street's likeness made a brief cameo appearance on the Simpsons episode: "Homer at the Bat" (1992) as one of the would-be ringers for Mr. Burns' softball team. Mr. Burns has planned to have Street play catcher until his assistant Smithers has to point out that all of the players Mr. Burns had selected had long since retired and died.

In the book Catching the Moon: The Story of a Young Girl's Baseball Dream by Crystal Hubbard, Gabby Street runs a baseball camp. The main character is denied based on the fact she is a girl. When she proves herself, he allows her to attend with the caveat to bring a glove and cleats. When she is unable to afford cleats, he buys a pair for her. This is based on a true story about Toni Stone and how she got her first pair of cleats.

== Managerial record ==
Team	Year	Regular season					Postseason			
Team	Year	Games	Won	Lost	Win %	Finish	Won	Lost	Win %	Result
STL	1929	1	1	0	1.000	interim	–	–	–	–
STL	1930	154	92	62	.597	1st in NL	2	4	.333	Lost World Series (PHA)
STL	1931	154	101	53	.656	1st in NL	4	3	.462	Won World Series (PHA)
STL	1932	154	72	82	.468	6th in NL	–	–	–	–
STL	1933	91	46	45	.505	fired	–	–	–	–
STL total		554	312	242	.563		6	7	.462	
SLB	1938	143	53	90	.371	fired	–	–	–	–
SLB total		143	53	90	.371		0	0	–	
Total		697	365	332	.524		6	7	.462	

== See also ==
- List of Major League Baseball player–managers
