= Chick Hafey =

American baseball player (1903–1973)

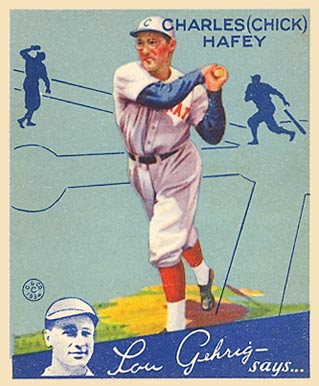
- Outfielder
- Born: February 12, 1903; Berkeley, California, U.S.
- Died: July 2, 1973 (aged 70); Calistoga, California, U.S.
- Batted: Right Threw: Right

MLB debut
- August 28, 1924, for the St. Louis Cardinals

Last MLB appearance
- September 30, 1937, for the Cincinnati Reds

MLB statistics
- Batting average: .317
- Home runs: 164
- Runs batted in: 833
- Stats at Baseball Reference

Teams
- St. Louis Cardinals (1924–1931); Cincinnati Reds (1932–1935, 1937)

Career highlights and awards
- All-Star (1933); 2× World Series champion (1926, 1931); NL batting champion (1931); St. Louis Cardinals Hall of Fame

Member of the National

Baseball Hall of Fame
- Induction: 1971
- Election method: Veterans Committee

Charles James "Chick" Hafey (February 12, 1903 – July 2, 1973) was an American player in Major League Baseball (MLB). Playing for the St. Louis Cardinals (1924–1931) and Cincinnati Reds (1932–1935, 1937), Hafey was a strong line-drive hitter who batted for a high average on a consistent basis.

Hafey was part of two World Series championship teams (in 1926 and 1931) as a Cardinal and also made history with the first hit in an All-Star game, starting in left field and batting cleanup for the National League in the 1933 game. He was selected by the Veterans Committee for the Baseball Hall of Fame in 1971. In 2014, the Cardinals inducted him into their team hall of fame.

== Early life ==
Hafey was born on February 12, 1903, in Berkeley, California. He attended Berkeley High School. The St. Louis Cardinals signed Hafey out of high school as a pitcher. However, Cardinals business manager Branch Rickey noticed Hafey's hitting abilities and decided that Hafey should become an outfielder.

== Career ==
=== St. Louis Cardinals ===
Hafey played in the minor leagues for the Fort Smith Twins of the Western Association in 1923. He moved to the Houston Buffaloes of the Texas League the next year, hitting .360 before being called up to the Cardinals near the end of the season. He split time between the Cardinals and Syracuse Stars in 1925. He spent the 1926 season with the Cardinals, but he played only 78 games.

Hafey was the first major success of Rickey's expansive farm system, breaking through in 1927 when he led the National League in slugging. Hafey, however, had suffered multiple beanings in 1926. He developed sinus trouble and his vision deteriorated, and Hafey began to wear eyeglasses while playing. Although Specs Toporcer was the first baseball player to wear glasses, Hafey was the most prominent; he is one of two Hall of Famers with eyeglasses, Reggie Jackson being the other. Because his vision became so variable, Hafey was obliged to rotate among three different pairs of glasses.

In the field, Hafey was known for having a "rifle arm." He had a power peak, averaging 27 home runs and 114 RBI from 1928 to 1930. In July 1929, Hafey tied a National League record with ten hits in ten consecutive at-bats. In August 1930, he hit for the cycle. In 1931, Hafey won one of the closest races for a batting title in history, hitting .349 to beat New York's Bill Terry by just .0002, and teammate Jim Bottomley by .0007. The title was only secured by a hit in Hafey's final at-bat of the season. Hafey was fifth in the voting for the 1931 MVP award. When Hafey's Cardinals faced Al Simmons' Athletics in the 1931 World Series, it marked just the second time that two reigning batting champions had opposed one another in the Fall Classic.

Although the soft-spoken Hafey was overshadowed by some of his raucous Cardinals teammates, he was frequently at odds with management. Hafey's 1931 and 1932 seasons both began late due to salary disputes. Cardinals general manager Rickey fined Hafey for being late and out of shape in 1931. In 1932, coming off his batting title, Hafey demanded that the previous year's fine be added to his 1932 salary. When Rickey refused, Hafey bolted from St. Louis' spring training camp. Rickey responded by trading Hafey to the last-place Cincinnati Reds.

=== Cincinnati Reds ===
Hafey was happy to join the Reds, who gave him the raise he had sought, but his career faltered. His vision was still erratic, and his persistent sinus condition cost him half of the 1932 season, though he hit .344. In 1933, he was chosen for the inaugural All Star Game, recording the first-ever All-Star hit. Although he maintained a solid batting average as a Red, his offensive production decreased.

In June 1935, suffering from sinus problems and influenza, he returned to his ranch near Berkeley and his relatives there said that he would not return to baseball that season. The team wanted team surgeons to perform sinus surgery, but Hafey planned to have a procedure performed by his own doctor. He tried a minor league comeback in 1936, but he gave that up in April because he was experiencing vision problems and dizzy spells still attributed to sinusitis.

Hafey announced that he would attempt another comeback with the Reds in February 1937. Not long after that, Hafey abandoned that comeback due to a salary dispute. In May, he announced that he would work out with a Pacific Coast League team to work his way back to the Cardinals. He hit .261 in 89 major league games that year. He was released before the 1938 season by general manager Warren Giles when they could not agree to contract terms.

He finished his career batting .317, with 164 home runs and 833 RBI. Hafey played in four World Series, hitting .205 in 92 plate appearances. In 1981, Lawrence Ritter and Donald Honig included Hafey in their 1981 book The 100 Greatest Baseball Players of All Time. They cited what they called "the Smoky Joe Wood Syndrome," where a player of truly exceptional talent might rank with the all-time greats on merit, despite a career sharply curtailed by injury.

== Honors ==
Hafey was inducted into the Baseball Hall of Fame in 1971. Sabermetrician Bill James has listed Hafey as one of ten examples of Hall of Fame inductees who do not deserve the honor. In January 2014, the Cardinals announced Hafey among 22 former players and personnel to be inducted into the St. Louis Cardinals Hall of Fame Museum for the inaugural class of 2014.

== See also ==
- List of Major League Baseball players to hit for the cycle
- List of Major League Baseball batting champions
- List of St. Louis Cardinals team records

| Preceded by Hack Wilson | Hitting for the cycle August 21, 1930 | Succeeded by Babe Herman |
