= Jimmie Wilson (baseball) =

American baseball player and manager (1900–1947)

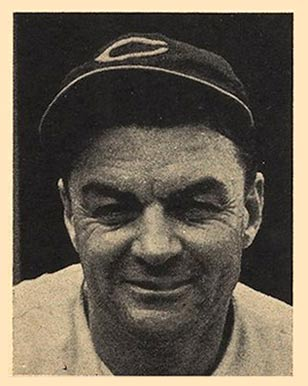
- Catcher / Manager
- Born: July 23, 1900; Philadelphia, Pennsylvania, U.S.
- Died: May 31, 1947 (aged 46); Bradenton, Florida, U.S.
- Batted: Right Threw: Right

MLB debut
- April 17, 1923, for the Philadelphia Phillies

Last MLB appearance
- September 29, 1940, for the Cincinnati Reds

MLB statistics
- Batting average: .284
- Home runs: 32
- Runs batted in: 621
- Managerial record: 493–735
- Winning %: .401
- Stats at Baseball Reference

Teams
- As player: Philadelphia Phillies (1923–1928); St. Louis Cardinals (1928–1933); Philadelphia Phillies (1934–1938); Cincinnati Reds (1939–1940); As manager: Philadelphia Phillies (1934–1938); Chicago Cubs (1941–1944)

Career highlights and awards
- 2× All-Star (1933, 1935); 2× World Series champion (1931, 1940)

James Wilson (July 23, 1900 – May 31, 1947), nicknamed "Ace", was an American professional athlete in soccer and baseball. He began his professional sports career as a soccer outside right in the National Association Football League and American Soccer League before becoming a catcher, manager and coach in Major League Baseball. Wilson was the starting catcher for the National League in baseball's first All-Star game. He threw and batted right-handed and was listed at 6 ft 1 1/2 in (187 cm) tall and 200 pounds (91 kg).

== Soccer ==
Wilson, the son of Scottish immigrants, was born in Philadelphia, Pennsylvania, where he grew up in the Kensington neighborhood of the city. He left school when he was 14 to work in a local textile mill. In 1919, he left the mills when he began playing as an outside forward with Philadelphia Merchant Ship B in the National Association Football League. During his time with the team, he met Dick Spalding, another two sport athlete, whom he later hired as his first base coach when Wilson managed the Phillies and Cubs. After Merchant Ship folded following the 1919–1920 season, Wilson moved to Bethlehem Steel F.C., signing with the team in July 1920. During his time in Bethlehem, he also played catcher for the steel company's baseball team which competed in the Steel League. In 1921, Wilson signed with Harrison S.C. in the newly established American Soccer League. He played thirteen league and three National Challenge Cup games, scoring four goals. During the 1922–1923 season, he played four games for Philadelphia Field Club before leaving the sport to concentrate on his baseball career.

== Baseball ==
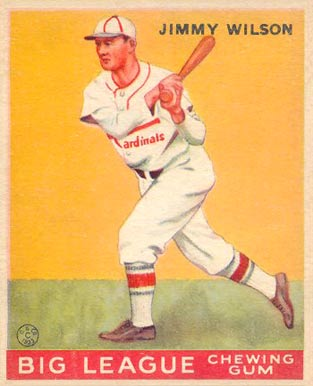
Baseball card of Wilson

1942 picture pack card of Kiki Cuyler, Wilson (middle), and Dick Spalding

During his years playing first division soccer, Wilson also made a name for himself as an excellent baseball player. When he signed with Bethlehem Steel in July 1920, the local newspaper stated, "The addition of Wilson would be a most welcome one, because his campaigning on the baseball diamond has been as brilliant as that in soccer circles. At present he is on the receiving end of the battery for the New Haven team in the Eastern League."

In February 1923, he gave up his soccer career when he was traded from New Haven in the Eastern League to the Philadelphia Phillies in the National League for Stan Baumgartner and Jack Withrow. Wilson's National League playing career would stretch over 18 seasons (1923–40) with the Philadelphia Phillies, St. Louis Cardinals and the Cincinnati Reds. He hit over .300 four times as a regular catcher and for his career batted .284 in 1,525 games.

In 1928, he joined baseball history when he was traded by the Phillies to the Cardinals during a game between the two teams. According to one account, "Wilson was a Phil for two innings, then darted into Redbird regalia, and sat on the St. Louis bench, for the remainder of the game." After the 1933 season, he was traded back to the Phillies for fellow catcher Spud Davis and infielder Eddie Delker.

From 1934 through 1938, he was the player-manager of his hometown Phillies, one of the worst teams in baseball at the time. He guided the Phils to three seventh place and two eighth (last) place finishes; in his final season, Philadelphia lost 103 of 149 games. He then joined the Cincinnati coaching staff in 1939 and played only four games that season.

Wilson umpired a major league game in 1940, under unusual circumstances. A game on April 23 between the Cincinnati Reds and St. Louis Cardinals had been postponed, and when it was about to be played at Crosley Field on May 13, it was found that no umpires had been assigned by the National League. Umpire Larry Goetz, who lived in Cincinnati, was summoned to the ballpark and served as home plate umpire. Wilson umpired at first base, and Cardinals' pitcher Lon Warneke umpired at third base. The game ended as an 8–8 tie after 14 innings, called due to darkness.

In August 1940, the Reds were stunned when Willard Hershberger, backup catcher to future Baseball Hall of Famer Ernie Lombardi, committed suicide in his Boston hotel room. The 40-year-old Wilson came off the coaching lines and joined the active roster, serving as the club's third catcher behind Lombardi and rookie Bill Baker. He played three games in August, but then in September Lombardi injured his ankle, and Wilson was pressed into starting duty. Splitting time with Baker and Dick West, Wilson played in 16 games during the pennant race, batting .243. When Lombardi was unable to return for more than spot duty in the 1940 World Series, Wilson came through, batting .353 in six games and playing a key role in Cincinnati's defeat of the Detroit Tigers, four games to three, for the world championship.

His stardom in the 1940 Fall Classic led to his second and last major league managing job, with the Chicago Cubs (1941–44), but he never had a winning record in Wrigleyville and his highest finish was fifth, in 1943. The following season, Wison resigned as manager of the Cubs after the team followed up an opening day victory with nine straight defeats to open the season. He was replaced by Roy Johnson for one game before Charlie Grimm took over as manager of the Cubs; that team finished fourth in 1944 before winning the pennant the following year. His final record as a manager, over nine full or partial seasons was: 493 wins and 735 losses (.401). Wilson has the dubious record of losses under .500 as a manager with 242. He also ranks 17th in lowest winning percentage for a manager (.401).

Wilson returned to Cincinnati as a coach in 1945–46. Released along with Reds manager Bill McKechnie at the end of the 1946 season, Wilson moved to Florida and entered the citrus growing business. He died suddenly of a heart attack at the age of 46 the following May in Bradenton.

== Personal ==
Wilson was also the father of 2nd Lt. Robert J. Wilson, a B-29 Flight Crew member who died in a training accident in Kharagpur, India on November 28, 1944.

== See also ==
- List of Major League Baseball player–managers
