= Charlie Gelbert =

American baseball player (1906–1967)

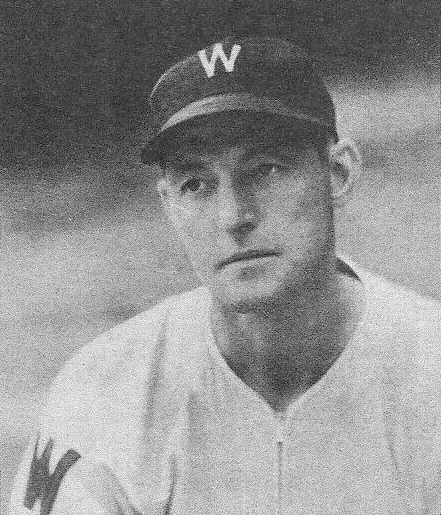
- Shortstop
- Born: January 26, 1906; Scranton, Pennsylvania, U.S.
- Died: January 13, 1967 (aged 60); Easton, Pennsylvania, U.S.
- Batted: Right Threw: Right

MLB debut
- April 16, 1929, for the St. Louis Cardinals

Last MLB appearance
- September 28, 1940, for the Boston Red Sox

MLB statistics
- Batting average: .267
- Home runs: 17
- Runs batted in: 350
- Stats at Baseball Reference

Teams
- St. Louis Cardinals (1929–1932, 1935–1936); Cincinnati Reds (1937); Detroit Tigers (1937); Washington Senators (1939–1940); Boston Red Sox (1940)

Career highlights and awards
- World Series champion (1931)

Charles Magnus Gelbert (January 26, 1906 – January 13, 1967) was an American professional baseball player. He played all or part of ten seasons in Major League Baseball for the St. Louis Cardinals (1929–32 and 1935–36), Cincinnati Reds (1937), Detroit Tigers (1937), Washington Senators (1939–40) and Boston Red Sox (1940), primarily as a shortstop.

== Early career ==
Gelbert, who was born in Scranton, Pennsylvania, attended Wissahickon High School in Ambler, Pennsylvania, and graduated from Lebanon Valley College in 1928. He was the son of American football player Charlie Gelbert, a College Football Hall of Fame end for the University of Pennsylvania who later had a brief professional football career with the early athletic clubs.

Gelbert began his professional career in 1926 with the minor league Syracuse Stars. He was acquired by the Cardinals from the Topeka Jayhawks of the Western Association in 1927, and made his Major League debut less than two years later.

== Major League career ==
Gelbert was the Cardinals' starting shortstop from 1929 to 1932, including the pennant-winning team of 1930, as well as the team that won the 1931 World Series. He finished 25th in voting for the 1931 National League MVP for playing in 131 games and having 447 at bats, 61 runs, 129 hits, 29 doubles, 5 triples, 1 home run, 62 RBI, 7 stolen bases, 54 walks, .289 batting average, .365 on-base percentage, .383 slugging percentage, 171 total bases and 4 sacrifice hits.

Gelbert's career was nearly ended when he severely injured his left ankle in a hunting accident, costing him two full seasons. He returned in 1935, but spent the rest of his career as a utility infielder.

In nine seasons, Gelbert played in 876 games and had 2,869 at bats, 398 runs, 766 hits, 169 doubles, 43 triples, 17 home runs, 350 RBI, 34 stolen bases, 290 walks, .267 batting average, .336 on-base percentage, .374 slugging percentage, 1,072 total bases and 49 sacrifice hits.

== Later life ==
After his playing career, Gelbert served as the coach of the Lafayette College baseball team for 21 years, from 1946 to 1966. He also briefly served as manager of the Hornell Dodgers of the Pennsylvania–Ontario–New York League (PONY League) in 1956. On January 13, 1967, Gelbert died in Easton, Pennsylvania, at the age of 60.
