= George Earnshaw =

American baseball player (1900–1976)

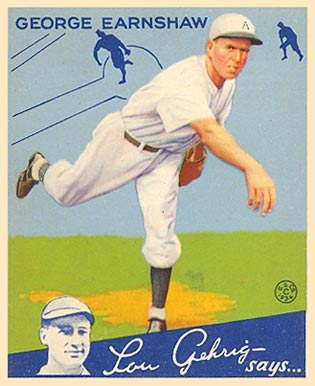
- George Earnshaw
- Pitcher
- Born: February 15, 1900; New York City, New York, U.S.
- Died: December 1, 1976 (aged 76); Little Rock, Arkansas, U.S.
- Batted: Right Threw: Right

MLB debut
- June 3, 1928, for the Philadelphia Athletics

Last MLB appearance
- September 26, 1936, for the St. Louis Cardinals

MLB statistics
- Win–loss record: 127–93
- Earned run average: 4.38
- Strikeouts: 1,002
- Stats at Baseball Reference

Teams
- Philadelphia Athletics (1928–1933); Chicago White Sox (1934); Brooklyn Dodgers (1935–1936); St. Louis Cardinals (1936)

Career highlights and awards
- 2× World Series champion (1929, 1930); AL wins leader (1929); Philadelphia Baseball Wall of Fame

George Livingston Earnshaw (February 15, 1900 – December 1, 1976) was an American professional baseball pitcher in Major League Baseball. He played in parts of nine seasons (1928–36) with the Philadelphia Athletics, Chicago White Sox, Brooklyn Dodgers, and St. Louis Cardinals. He was the American League wins leader in 1929 with the A's. For his career, he compiled a 127–93 record in 319 appearances, with a 4.38 ERA and 1,002 strikeouts. Earnshaw played on three American League pennant winners with the Athletics, winning the World Series in 1929 and 1930.

Born in New York City, Earnshaw grew to be 6 feet 4 inches (1.93 m) tall and 210 pounds (95 kg), earning him the nickname "Moose". He was aggressive, threw hard, and threw strikes. His career covered nine years with a total of 127 victories, and over half of Earnshaw's victories occurred during the A's pennant winning years 1929–31. He won four World Series games, starting eight games with five being complete games. He struck out 56 batters in 62 innings pitched and had an earned run average for the three Series of 1.58. Connie Mack gave more credit to Earnshaw for the Athletics' 1930 World Series victory over the St. Louis Cardinals than any other player.

Earnshaw did not reach the major leagues until he was 28 years old. A graduate of Swarthmore College in Pennsylvania, he was a pitching star for the minor league Baltimore Orioles when Connie Mack purchased his contract in June 1928. That season, the A's finished second in the American League, 2 1/2 games behind the Yankees. Moose had a record of 7–7 with a 3.85 ERA and 117 strikeouts in 158 innings pitched. It was in 1929 that Earnshaw and Lefty Grove began to dominate big league hitters. For the next three years, they were the only two pitchers on any one team to win 20 or more games. The 1929 season was George's turn to shine. His 24 victories against 8 losses was the most in the majors, and his 149 strikeouts were second only to teammate Grove in the American League and third in the majors. His fastball being wild at times, Earnshaw's 125 walks were an American League high, but his 3.28 ERA was among the best.

By 1936, Earnshaw's career came to an end with the St. Louis Cardinals and old nemesis Pepper Martin. Within a few years, George became a commander in the Navy in World War II. He returned to the majors for two years as a coach for the 1949–50 Philadelphia Phillies.

A better than average hitting pitcher in his 9-year major league career, Earnshaw compiled a .230 batting average (162-for-704) with 61 runs, 3 home runs and 70 RBIs. In the A's three consecutive pennants in 1929, 1930 and 1931, he recorded 10, 10 and 13 RBIs respectively. However, in the eight World Series games in which he appeared, he went 0-for-22 with a run scored.

On December 1, 1976, Earnshaw died at a hospital in Little Rock, Arkansas.

== See also ==
- List of Major League Baseball annual wins leaders

Preceded by Van Mungo	Brooklyn Dodgers Opening Day; Starting pitcher 1936	Succeeded by Van Mungo
