= Bill Hallahan =

American baseball player (1902–1981)

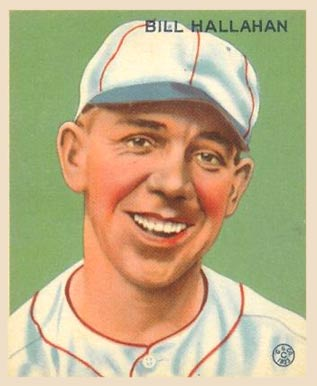
- Pitcher
- Born: August 4, 1902; Binghamton, New York, U.S.
- Died: July 8, 1981 (aged 78); Binghamton, New York, U.S.
- Batted: Right Threw: Left

MLB debut
- April 16, 1925, for the St. Louis Cardinals

Last MLB appearance
- September 14, 1938, for the Philadelphia Phillies

MLB statistics
- Win–loss record: 102–94
- Earned run average: 4.03
- Strikeouts: 856
- Stats at Baseball Reference

Teams
- St. Louis Cardinals (1925–1926; 1929–1936); Cincinnati Reds (1936–1937); Philadelphia Phillies (1938)

Career highlights and awards
- All-Star (1933); 3× World Series champion (1926, 1931, 1934); NL wins leader (1931); 2× NL strikeout leader (1930, 1931)

William Anthony Hallahan (August 4, 1902 – July 8, 1981) was an American left-handed pitcher in Major League Baseball during the 1920s and 1930s. Nicknamed "Wild Bill" because of his lack of control on the mound—he twice led the National League in bases on balls—Hallahan nevertheless was one of the pitching stars of the 1931 World Series and pitched his finest in postseason competition.

Hallahan also was the starting pitcher for the National League in the first All-Star Game in 1933, losing a 4–2 decision to Lefty Gomez of the American League and surrendering a third-inning home run to Babe Ruth in the process.

== Early years in baseball ==
Hallahan, a native of Binghamton, New York, spent most of his career with the St. Louis Cardinals. He signed with their nearby AA farm club, the Syracuse Stars of the International League, in 1924. The following season, he made his first NL appearance for the Redbirds, appearing in six games. In 1926, Hallahan pitched in 19 games for the Cardinals during the regular season, and made a first, brief World Series appearance that fall against the New York Yankees.

But Hallahan was not yet ready for an extended Major League career. He spent 1927 with Syracuse, winning 19 games and leading the International League in strikeouts (195) and walks (135). The next season, he won 23 games for the Houston Buffaloes and led the Texas League in strikeouts (244). Finally, in 1929, he rejoined the Cardinals for good.

== Stalwart World Series hurler ==
Hallahan became a starting pitcher in 1930, winning 15 games for the pennant-winning Cardinals and leading the NL in strikeouts (177) and walks (126). In the 1930 World Series against the Philadelphia Athletics, Hallahan split two decisions but he shut out the powerful A's in Game 3 and allowed only two earned runs in 11 innings, for a sparkling ERA of 1.64. Philadelphia won the Series in six games, the only World Series Hallahan's Cardinals would ever lose.

In 1931, Hallahan again led the NL in strikeouts (159) and walks (112) and won 19 games, as St. Louis again took the league championship for a rematch against the Athletics. This time, Hallahan was even more effective. He shut out the A's again in Game 2, pitched a complete game 5–1 victory in Game 5, and nailed down the decisive Game 7 in relief by getting the last out in the ninth inning. All together, he gave up only 12 hits and one run in 18 1/3 innings — an ERA of 0.36 — as St. Louis triumphed in seven games. Hallahan's dominance is even more impressive because the A's featured a predominantly right-handed-hitting lineup, including fearsome sluggers Jimmie Foxx and Al Simmons.

After two more winning campaigns for non-contending Cardinal clubs, Hallahan won only eight games, losing 12, for the 1934 edition. But the Gashouse Gang won the National League title and gave Hallahan one more chance to experience the big stage. In Game 2 of the 1934 World Series, against the Detroit Tigers, Hallahan started against Detroit ace Schoolboy Rowe and left with one out in the eighth inning of a 2–2 tie. Detroit won the game in the ninth, 3–2, but overall the Cardinals again prevailed in seven games.

All together, in seven World Series games and 39 1/3 innings, Hallahan won three games, lost one with an earned-run average of 1.36—still, in 2014, one of the ten lowest (and best) ERAs ever recorded by a pitcher in the postseason (which now includes divisional and championship series playoffs).

Hallahan stayed with the Cardinals until May 31, 1936, when he was sold to the Cincinnati Reds, then a second-division team. His career statistics suffered with the Reds and his final club, the cellar-dwelling Philadelphia Phillies. Over his last two seasons, 1937–38, Hallahan won four and lost 17 games.

Hallahan finished with a regular-season record of 102 victories and 94 defeats, 856 strikeouts and 779 walks, and an ERA of 4.03 in 1,740 1/3 innings pitched.

== Life after baseball ==
After retiring from baseball, Hallahan worked as a supervisor for General Aniline and Film Co. (now GAF) in Johnson City, New York. He lived on Davis Street on the West Side of Binghamton, where he led a very quiet life. He was a local legend to the young kids in that neighborhood who frequently begged him to show them his World Series watches and rings. He always obliged. Wild Bill would attend Little League games at nearby Recreation Park to cheer on the neighborhood kids. The field there is dedicated in his honor.

Hallahan died at age 78 in Binghamton, New York.

== See also ==
- List of Major League Baseball annual strikeout leaders
- List of Major League Baseball annual wins leaders
