= Lefty Gomez =

American baseball player (1908–1989)

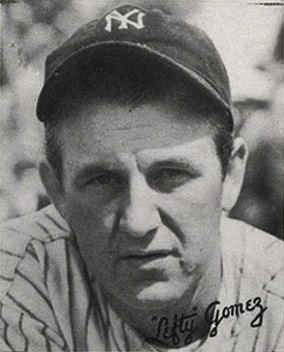
- Pitcher
- Born: November 26, 1908; Rodeo, California, U.S.
- Died: February 17, 1989 (aged 80); Greenbrae, California, U.S.
- Batted: Left Threw: Left

MLB debut
- April 29, 1930, for the New York Yankees

Last MLB appearance
- May 30, 1943, for the Washington Senators

MLB statistics
- Win–loss record: 189–102
- Earned run average: 3.34
- Strikeouts: 1,468
- Stats at Baseball Reference

Teams
- New York Yankees (1930–1942); Washington Senators (1943)

Career highlights and awards
- 7× All-Star (1933–1939); 5× World Series champion (1932, 1936–1939); 2× Triple Crown (1934, 1937); 2× AL wins leader (1934, 1937); 2× AL ERA leader (1934, 1937); 3× AL strikeout leader (1933, 1934, 1937); Monument Park honoree

Member of the National

Baseball Hall of Fame
- Induction: 1972
- Election method: Veterans Committee

Vernon Louis "Lefty" Gomez (November 26, 1908 – February 17, 1989) was an American baseball player. A left-handed pitcher, Gomez played in Major League Baseball (MLB) between 1930 and 1943 for the New York Yankees and the Washington Senators; he was a five-time World Series champion with the Yankees. During the 1930s he had the most strikeouts (1,337) of any pitcher and joint most All-Star selections of any player.

Gomez grew up in California and played for the San Francisco Seals after high school. He made his MLB debut with the Yankees in April 1930. He was selected as an All-Star every year between 1933 and 1939. He sustained an arm injury in 1940, though he rebounded well in 1941. He pitched his last full season in 1942, then appeared in one game in 1943 before retiring with the Washington Senators.

In 1933, Gomez married June O'Dea, who had a brief career as a Broadway actress. After his retirement, he became a popular public speaker. Gomez was elected to the National Baseball Hall of Fame by the Veterans Committee in 1972. He made an appearance at Yankee Stadium in 1987, when he and Whitey Ford were honored with plaques at the stadium's Monument Park.

Gomez was broadly known in major league baseball for his colorful personality and humor. He died in California in 1989.

== Early life ==
Gomez was born in Rodeo, California. His father, Francisco Gomez, was born in California to a Spanish father, Juan Gomez, and a Portuguese mother, Rita. Lefty's mother, Lizzie Herring, was of Welsh-Irish descent. He was the youngest of eight children in his family. His father, who grew up as a cowboy and was known as “Coyote” most of his life, managed a 1,000-acre ranch in Franklin Canyon where Lefty and his brothers rode horses and became hired hands when they were children. They would wake up as early as 4:00 am to milk the cows and clean out the stalls before they headed to school for the day. When Lefty was 6 years old he attended the Panama–Pacific International Exposition in San Francisco and watched the famous pilot Lincoln Beachey crash into the bay while trying to complete a stunt. As a youngster he was very outgoing; when he was 8 years old, he attended a July 4th parade where he found a new passion to play the saxophone. His brother Earl was a big help and purchased for Lefty his first saxophone. Lefty then took a job plucking chickens at the local butcher shop to earn money for lessons.

Gomez started playing sandlot baseball for the Rodeo town team when he was only 13 years of age. He pitched throughout central California and caught the eye of a scout for the San Francisco Seals, who told Lefty to get in touch after he put on more weight. He attended Richmond high school because his local school did not have a baseball team. In his senior year he was offered a scholarship to play baseball at St. Mary's College, a small school east of Oakland. However, his father pressed him to give up baseball and focus on schoolwork to become an engineer like his older brother Milfred.

== Career ==
Although his father did not favor continuing baseball, he signed a contract for Lefty to play for the Seals at the 1928 spring training camp. Later he was sent to the Utah–Idaho League for the season. The New York Yankees purchased Gomez's contract from the Seals for an estimated $39,000. He reported at height 6 feet 2 inches (1.88 m) and weight at 147 pounds (67 kg), which prompted some observers to caution that he was not ready for the big leagues.

Gomez made his major league debut on April 29, 1930. He pitched in only 15 games and finished the season with a 2–5 win–loss record, a 5.55 earned run average (ERA). Beginning the 1931 season, Gomez had good pitching velocity but the Yankees were still concerned about his slender frame. Following a common medical strategy of the time, the team had most of his teeth extracted; they also had him drink 3 US quarts (2,800 ml) of milk daily and gave him an unlimited meal allowance for road games. Gomez registered the second-best ERA in the American League in 1931.

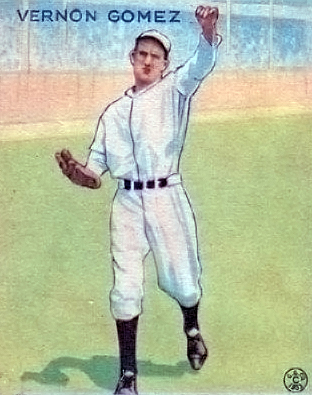
Gomez's 1933 Goudey baseball card

A 20-game winner four times and an All-Star every year from 1933 to 1939, Gomez led the league twice each in wins, winning percentage and ERA; he was a three-time league leader in shutouts and strikeouts. In the first major league All-Star Game, July 6, 1933, Gomez was the winning pitcher for the American League (AL) and he drove in the first run of the game. This was out of character for him as he was notorious for poor hitting even by AL pitchers' standards. (Later in life, Gomez commented, "I never even broke a bat until last year when I was backing out of the garage." His career OPS+ of -7 is the fifth-worst in baseball history among players with at least 1,000 plate appearances.) Gomez holds the record for the most innings pitched in a single All-Star game (six, in 1934).

Lefty's best season came in 1934, when he won 26 games and lost just five. In both 1934 and 1937, he won pitching's "Triple Crown" by leading the league in wins, ERA and strikeouts; he also led the AL both seasons in shutouts. His .649 career winning percentage ranks 15th in major league history among pitchers with 200 or more decisions. Among pitchers who made their MLB debuts from 1900 to 1950, only Lefty Grove, Christy Mathewson and Whitey Ford have both more victories and a higher winning percentage than Gomez.

Gomez won six World Series games without a loss. As of 2021, this is a postseason record as well as a World Series record. He won a World Series game in 1932, two in 1936, two in 1937 and one in 1938. He also set a World Series record by receiving two walks in the same inning on October 6, 1937.

Nicknamed "El Goofo" and "Goofy Gomez", he was known for his sense of humor, even on the field. In one game, he came up to bat when it was slightly foggy. Bob Feller was on the mound and Gomez struck a match before stepping into the batter's box. "What's the big idea?" asked the umpire. "Do you think that match will help you see Feller's fast one?" Gomez replied, "No, I'm not concerned about that. I just want to make sure he can see me!" Another time, a reporter asked the noted brushback pitcher, "Is it true that you'd throw at your own mother?" Gomez replied, "You're damn right I would. She's a good hitter." Gomez also often remarked, "I'd rather be lucky than good."

In 1940 Gomez suffered an arm injury that left him up for grabs by another team; but in 1941 he played fairly well, winning 15 and losing 5. During that season, he was said to be a great starting pitcher but won through the support of Johnny Murphy, who relieved him in later innings. After the 1942 season Gomez took a job as a dispatcher—with the General Electric River Works, a defense plant in Lynn, Massachusetts—that paid only $40 a week. On January 27, 1943 the Yankees sold him to the Boston Braves for $10,000 ($186,058 in current dollar terms).

Gomez never appeared in a game with the Braves, as later in the year he was released from his contract and signed with the Washington Senators. He pitched just one game—on May 30, 1943, allowing four hits, four runs and walking five—before pulling a shoulder muscle in the fifth inning. He then retired from baseball. He had a 189–102 career record with 1,468 strikeouts and a 3.34 ERA in 2,503 innings pitched.

== Marriage ==
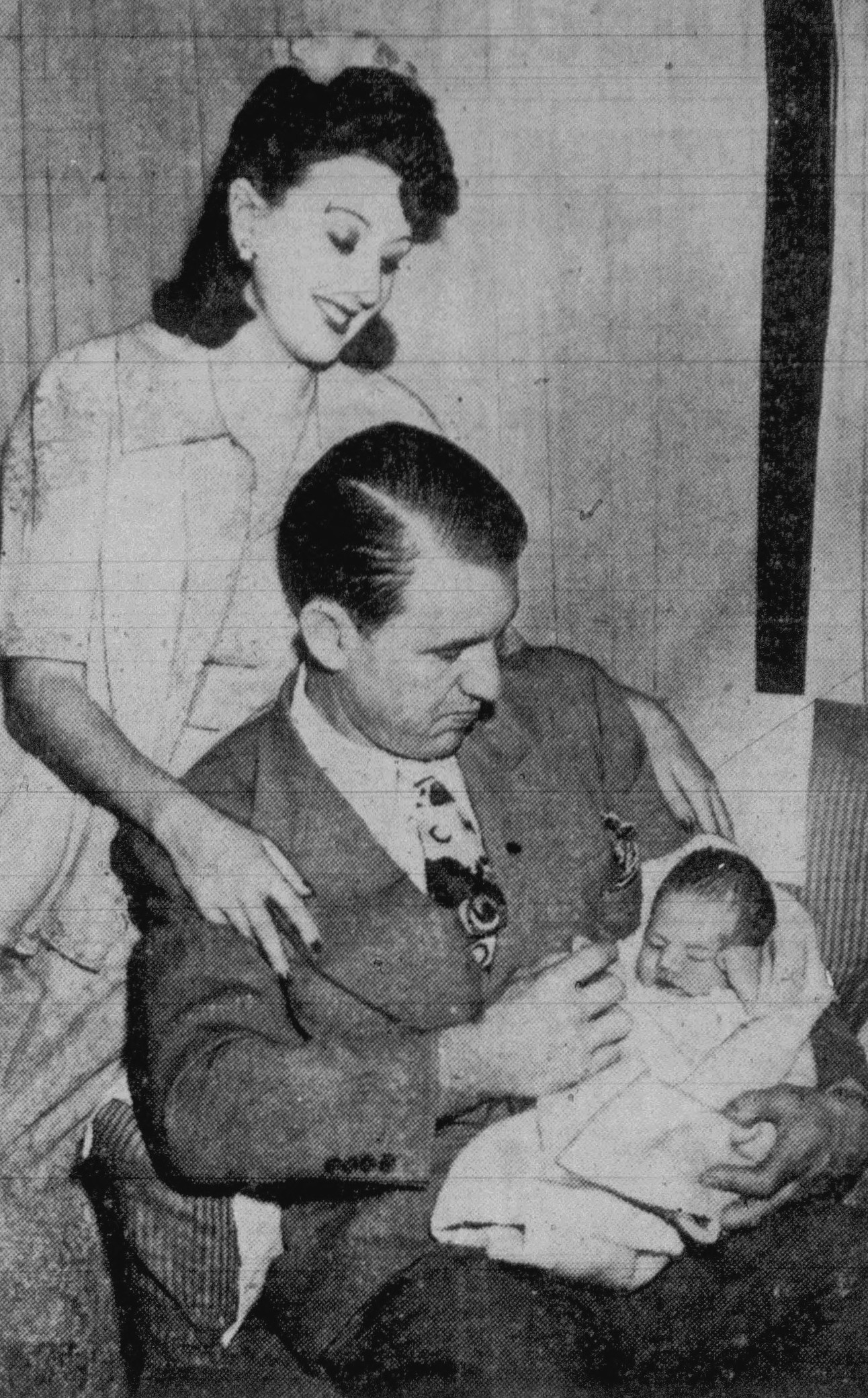
Gomez with his wife and newborn son in 1942.

On February 26, 1933, Gomez married June O’Dea (1912–1992). A Broadway headliner who starred in Of Thee I Sing, she gave up her career in 1936. By 1937 the marriage was on shaky ground. Gomez traveled to Hollywood that April and June returned to Massachusetts to stay with family. Through the tabloids, she learned in December that Gomez was filing divorce papers in Mexico, charging incompatibility. Being a devout Catholic, June refused a divorce but agreed to a formal separation, citing abandonment and cruel and inhuman treatment. Publicly, Gomez said the whole idea of divorce was absurd, but after the first of the year he moved to Reno to get a six-week divorce. It was his intention for the divorce to be finalized by the time he began spring training in Florida. Separation proceedings continued for months, but were called off in May 1938. Gomez and O'Dea had two daughters and two sons.

== After baseball ==
In retirement, Gomez became a sought-after dinner speaker known for his humorous anecdotes about his playing days and the personalities he knew. He was a bit of a screwball, nicknamed "El Goofo" or "Goofy Gomez" (a likewise-alliterative counterpart to his contemporary, Dizzy Dean), and delighted in playing practical jokes on everyone from teammates to umpires. On February 2, 1972, the Veterans Committee unanimously inducted Gomez into the National Baseball Hall of Fame, along with Giants outfielder Ross Youngs and former American League President Will Harridge. The Committee noted that Lefty pitched in seven World Series games with no losses and five wins. Wearing a Yankee cap, Gomez became the second player of Hispanic descent to be inducted.

The 1983 Major League Baseball All-Star Game was dedicated to Gomez as he was the last surviving player from the 1933 All-Star Game. He also threw out the ceremonial first pitch. On August 2, 1987, he and Whitey Ford were honored with plaques to be placed in Monument Park at Yankee Stadium. Gomez's plaque says he was "Noted for his wit and his fastball, as he was fast with a quip and a pitch." Despite advancing age, he was able to attend the ceremony. Although he was honored with the plaque, his uniform #11 has not been retired, and has since been worn by several Yankees including Joe Page, Johnny Sain, Héctor López, Fred Stanley, Dwight Gooden, Chuck Knoblauch, Gary Sheffield, Doug Mientkiewicz, Brett Gardner, and now Anthony Volpe.

Gomez spent the last years of his life in Novato, California; he died of congestive heart failure on February 17, 1989, in Marin General Hospital in Larkspur, California. A decade later, he was ranked #73 on The Sporting News list of the 100 Greatest Baseball Players, and was a nominee for the Major League Baseball All-Century Team. The baseball field at White Hill Middle School in Fairfax, California is named for him.

== See also ==
- List of Major League Baseball annual ERA leaders
- List of Major League Baseball annual strikeout leaders
- List of Major League Baseball annual wins leaders
- Major League Baseball titles leaders
- Major League Baseball Triple Crown
- Bay Area Sports Hall of Fame

== Footnotes ==
Achievements
Preceded by Lefty Grove	American League Pitching Triple Crown; 1934 & 1937	Succeeded by Bob Feller
