= 1935 Cincinnati Reds season =

1935 Cincinnati Reds
- League: National League
- Ballpark: Crosley Field
- City: Cincinnati
- Owners: Powel Crosley Jr.
- General managers: Larry MacPhail
- Managers: Chuck Dressen
- Radio: WCPO (Harry Hartman); WSAI (Red Barber)

The 1935 Cincinnati Reds season was a season in American baseball. The team finished sixth in the National League with a record of 68–85, 31½ games behind the Chicago Cubs. The highlight of the season was the first night game in Major League baseball history when the Reds behind the arm of Paul Derringer prevailed over the Philadelphia Phillies 2-1 under the lights at Crosley Field in Cincinnati.

== Off-season ==
On November 3, the Reds purchased two players from the St. Louis Cardinals. The team purchased outfielder Ival Goodman for $25,000 and third baseman Lew Riggs for $30,000. Goodman had not yet reached the major leagues, as he spent the 1934 season with the Cardinals AA affiliate, the Rochester Red Wings of the International League. With the Red Wings, Goodman hit .331 with 19 home runs in 140 games. Riggs did appear in two games with St. Louis in 1934, however, he spent most of the season with the Columbus Red Birds of the American Association, where he batted .277 with 11 home runs in 148 games.

Later in the month, on November 22, Cincinnati purchased pitcher Danny MacFayden from the New York Yankees. MacFayden had a 4–3 record with a 4.50 ERA in 22 games with the Yankees, making 11 starts. In 1929, when he pitched for the Boston Red Sox, MacFayden led the American League with four shutouts.

In December, the Reds made some more moves. On the 13th, Cincinnati purchased first baseman Johnny Mize from the St. Louis Cardinals. Mize hit .339 with 17 home runs with the Rochester Red Wings.

The next day, on December 14, the club traded infielder Mark Koenig and pitcher Allyn Stout to the New York Giants in exchange for shortstop Billy Myers and cash. Myers hit .313 and 10 home runs with the St. Louis Cardinals affiliate, the Columbus Red Birds during the 1934 season.

On December 19, the Reds purchased outfielder Samuel Byrd from the New York Yankees. Byrd hit .246 with three home runs and 23 RBI in 106 games in 1934.

Early in 1935, Cincinnati acquired shortstop Eddie Miller from the Springfield Pirates of the Middle Atlantic League. Miller hit .286 with three home runs in 122 games as a 17 year old with the club in 1934.

In mid-April, one day before the regular season started, the Reds returned first baseman Johnny Mize to the St. Louis Cardinals after he suffered a groin injury, nullifying the trade.

== Regular season ==
The rebuilding Reds started the season with a .500 record in April, going 7–7 and sitting in fourth place, 2.5 games behind the first place Brooklyn Dodgers. Late in the month, Cincinnati purchased infielder Billy Sullivan from the St. Paul Saints of the American Association. Sullivan had last played in the major leagues in 1933 with the Chicago White Sox, where he hit .192 in 54 games.

In May, the club struggled, earning a record of 3–9 to begin the month, dropping their overall to 10-16 and into sixth place, eight games behind the pennant leading New York Giants. Cincinnati rebounded from their slump, winning six games in a row to even their record at 16–16. During their winning streak, on May 24, the Reds hosted the Brooklyn Dodgers in what was the first night game in Major League history. In front of a crowd of 20,422 fans, the Reds defeated the Dodgers 2–1.

Following their six-game winning streak, the Reds won only one of their next 11 games, dropping to 17–26 and back into sixth place, 13.5 games behind the Giants. During the month of June, Cincinnati returned pitcher Danny MacFayden to the New York Yankees and sold little used infielder Tony Piet to the Chicago White Sox. Later in the month, the club purchased pitcher Emmett Nelson from the Los Angeles Angels of the Pacific Coast League. Nelson had a record of 11–5 with an ERA of 3.12 in 20 games with the Angels. Cincinnati also purchased outfielder Babe Herman from the Pittsburgh Pirates. Herman, who played with the Reds in 1932, had a .235 average and seven runs batted in with Pittsburgh in 1935.

On July 5, the Reds signed free agent outfielder Kiki Cuyler. Cuyler began the 1935 season with the Chicago Cubs, hitting .268 with four home runs and 18 RBI in 45 games. While with the Cubs, Cuyler led the NL in stolen bases for three consecutive seasons, from 1928 to 1930, and in 1934, he led the league with 42 doubles. Earlier in his career, while with the Pittsburgh Pirates, Cuyler led the NL with 26 triples and 144 runs in 1925, followed by leading the league in runs again in 1926 with 113 and in stolen bases with 35.

During July and August, the Reds continued to struggle for victories, as by the end of August, the club had a record of 54–73 and was in seventh place, 25 games behind the pennant leading St. Louis Cardinals.

Cincinnati had a strong September, winning 14 of 26 games to close out the season, finishing the year with a 68–85 record. This marked the Reds seventh consecutive under .500 season, and eighth in the past nine seasons. Cincinnati finished the season in sixth place, 31.5 games behind the pennant winning Chicago Cubs. This marked the first time the Reds finished out of last place since 1930. The Reds 68 victories was their highest total since winning 78 games in 1928. With the popularity of night games, Reds attendance more than doubled from the 1934 season, as the club drew 448,247 fans during 1935. This was the highest attendance since drawing 490,490 fans in 1928.

Catcher Ernie Lombardi led the club with a .343 batting average, while hitting 12 home runs and 64 RBI in 120 games. Lombardi struck out only six times in 332 at-bats. Outfielder Ival Goodman batted .269, while leading the Reds with 159 hits and 72 RBI, and tying Lombardi for the team lead with 12 home runs, in 148 games. Outfielder Babe Herman hit .335 with 10 home runs and 58 RBI in 92 games with the club following his acquisition during the season.

Paul Derringer anchored the Reds pitching staff, leading the club with a 22–13 record and a 3.51 ERA in 45 games, throwing 20 complete games, while striking out 120 batters. Rookie Gene Schott was 8–11 with a 3.91 ERA in 33 games, while another rookie, Al Hollingsworth, posted a record of 6–13 with a 3.89 ERA in 38 games.

=== Season standings ===
National League
Team	W	L	Pct.	GB	Home	Road
Chicago Cubs	100	54	.649	—	56‍–‍21	44‍–‍33
St. Louis Cardinals	96	58	.623	4	53‍–‍24	43‍–‍34
New York Giants	91	62	.595	8½	50‍–‍27	41‍–‍35
Pittsburgh Pirates	86	67	.562	13½	46‍–‍31	40‍–‍36
Brooklyn Dodgers	70	83	.458	29½	38‍–‍38	32‍–‍45
Cincinnati Reds	68	85	.444	31½	41‍–‍35	27‍–‍50
Philadelphia Phillies	64	89	.418	35½	35‍–‍43	29‍–‍46
Boston Braves	38	115	.248	61½	25‍–‍50	13‍–‍65

=== Record vs. opponents ===
1935 National League record Sources:
Team	BSN	BRO	CHC	CIN	NYG	PHI	PIT	STL
Boston	—	6–16	3–19	10–12	5–16	8–14	2–20	4–18
Brooklyn	16–6	—	5–17	11–11	9–13	12–9–1	11–11	6–16
Chicago	19–3	17–5	—	14–8	14–8	13–9	15–7	8–14
Cincinnati	12–10	11–11	8–14	—	8–14–1	13–9	8–13	8–14
New York	16–5	13–9	8–14	14–8–1	—	12–10–2	14–8	14–8
Philadelphia	14–8	9–12–1	9–13	9–13	10–12–2	—	6–16	7–15
Pittsburgh	20–2	11–11	7–15	13–8	8–14	16–6	—	11–11
St. Louis	18–4	16–6	14–8	14–8	8–14	15–7	11–11	—

=== Roster ===
1935 Cincinnati Reds roster
Roster
Pitchers: 28 Don Brennan; 25 Paul Derringer; 23 Tony Freitas; 22 Benny Frey; 32 Lee Grissom; 20 Leroy Herrmann; 30 Whitey Hilcher; 26 Al Hollingsworth; 21 Si Johnson; 24 Danny MacFayden; 29 Emmett Nelson; 27 Gene Schott	Catchers: 19 Gilly Campbell; 18 Hank Erickson; 17 Ernie Lombardi; Infielders: 1 Jim Bottomley; -- Calvin Chapman; 3 Alex Kampouris; 5 Billy Myers; 9 Lew Riggs; 24 Les Scarsella; 6 Gordon Slade; 4,29 Billy Sullivan	Outfielders: 12 Sammy Byrd; 14 Adam Comorosky; 8 Kiki Cuyler; 25 Lee Gamble; 10 Ival Goodman; 11 Chick Hafey; 11 Babe Herman; 11 Ted Petoskey; 8 Tony Piet; 15 Harlin Pool	Manager: 7 Chuck Dressen; Coaches: 33 George Kelly; 31 Tom Sheehan

== Player stats ==
=== Batting ===
==== Starters by position ====
Note: Pos = Position; G = Games played; AB = At bats; H = Hits; Avg. = Batting average; HR = Home runs; RBI = Runs batted in

Pos	Player	G	AB	H	Avg.	HR	RBI
C	Ernie Lombardi	120	332	114	.343	12	64
1B	Jim Bottomley	107	399	103	.258	1	49
2B	Alex Kampouris	148	499	123	.246	7	62
3B	Lew Riggs	142	532	148	.278	5	46
SS	Billy Myers	117	445	119	.267	5	36
OF	Ival Goodman	148	592	159	.269	12	72
OF	Sammy Byrd	121	416	109	.262	9	52
OF	Babe Herman	92	349	117	.335	10	58

==== Other batters ====
Note: G = Games played; AB = At bats; H = Hits; Avg. = Batting average; HR = Home runs; RBI = Runs batted in

Player	G	AB	H	Avg.	HR	RBI
Billy Sullivan	85	241	64	.266	2	36
Kiki Cuyler	62	223	56	.251	2	22
Gilly Campbell	88	218	56	.257	3	30
Gordon Slade	71	196	55	.281	1	14
Adam Comorosky	59	137	34	.248	2	14
Hank Erickson	37	88	23	.261	1	4
Harlin Pool	28	68	12	.176	0	11
Chick Hafey	15	59	20	.339	1	9
Calvin Chapman	15	53	18	.340	0	3
Les Scarsella	6	10	2	.200	0	0
Ted Petoskey	4	5	2	.400	0	0
Tony Piet	6	5	1	.200	0	2
Lee Gamble	2	4	2	.500	0	2

=== Pitching ===
==== Starting pitchers ====
Note: G = Games pitched; IP = Innings pitched; W = Wins; L = Losses; ERA = Earned run average; SO = Strikeouts

Player	G	IP	W	L	ERA	SO
Paul Derringer	45	276.2	22	13	3.51	120
Lee Grissom	3	21.0	1	1	3.86	13

==== Other pitchers ====
Note: G = Games pitched; IP = Innings pitched; W = Wins; L = Losses; ERA = Earned run average; SO = Strikeouts

Player	G	IP	W	L	ERA	SO
Al Hollingsworth	38	173.1	6	13	3.89	89
Gene Schott	33	159.0	8	11	3.91	49
Tony Freitas	31	143.2	5	10	4.57	51
Si Johnson	30	130.0	5	11	6.23	40
Benny Frey	38	114.1	6	10	6.85	24
Leroy Herrmann	29	106.0	3	5	3.58	30
Emmett Nelson	19	60.1	4	4	4.33	14
Danny MacFayden	7	36.0	1	2	4.75	13
Whitey Hilcher	4	19.1	2	0	2.79	9

==== Relief pitchers ====
Note: G = Games pitched; W = Wins; L = Losses; SV = Saves; ERA = Earned run average; SO = Strikeouts

Player	G	W	L	SV	ERA	SO
Don Brennan	38	5	5	5	3.15	48

== Farm system ==
Level	Team	League	Manager
AA	Toronto Maple Leafs	International League	Ike Boone
B	Wilmington Pirates	Piedmont League	Harry McCurdy and Riley Parker
C	Bartlesville Reds	Western Association	Marty Purtell
D	Mt. Airy Reds	Bi-State League	Mickey Shader
D	Lake Charles Skippers	Evangeline League	Josh Billings
D	Monessen Reds	Pennsylvania State Association	Milt Stock

LEAGUE CHAMPIONS: Monessen
