= 1936 Cincinnati Reds season =

1936 Cincinnati Reds
- League: National League
- Ballpark: Crosley Field
- City: Cincinnati
- Owners: Powel Crosley Jr.
- General managers: Larry MacPhail, Warren Giles
- Managers: Chuck Dressen
- Radio: WCPO (Harry Hartman); WSAI (Red Barber)

The 1936 Cincinnati Reds season was a season in American baseball. The team finished fifth in the National League with a record of 74–80, 18 games behind the New York Giants.

== Offseason ==
On November 22, 1935, the Reds signed free agent centerfielder Hub Walker. Walker saw limited action with the Detroit Tigers in 1935, batting .160 with one RBI in only nine games. With the Tigers AA affiliate, the Toledo Mud Hens, Walker hit .335 with 11 home runs in 113 games. On the same date, the Reds acquired first baseman George McQuinn from the New York Giants. McQuinn played with the Giants AA affiliate, the Newark Bears in 1935, hitting .288 with 11 home runs in 148 games.

On December 12, Cincinnati purchased infielder Tommy Thevenow from the Pittsburgh Pirates. Thevenow hit .238 with 47 RBI in 122 games during the 1935 season, playing mostly at third base. His best season was in 1926, when Thevenow finished fourth in National League MVP voting when he batted .256 with two home runs and 63 RBI in 156 games for the St. Louis Cardinals. He helped the Cardinals win the 1926 World Series over the New York Yankees with a .417 batting average with a home run and four RBI in seven games. The Reds also purchased minor league pitcher Johnny Vander Meer from the Boston Braves. Vander Meer had a 7-10 record with a 5.35 ERA in 24 games with the Scranton Miners of the New York-Penn League.

The Reds sold infielder Billy Sullivan to the Cleveland Indians on January 29. Sullivan hit .266 with two home runs and 36 RBI with the Reds during the 1935 season.

The Reds held spring training at San Juan, Puerto Rico. The Reds opened camp at San Juan on February 10, 1936.

During spring training, the Reds traded first baseman Jim Bottomley to the St. Louis Browns for infielder Johnny Burnett. Bottomley struggled with Cincinnati in 1935, hitting .258 with one home run and 49 RBI in 107 games. Burnett hit .223 with 26 RBI in 70 games in his first season with the Browns, after spending the first eight seasons of his career with the Cleveland Indians.

== Regular season ==
The Reds had a solid start to the regular season, winning six of their first ten games to sit in second place in the National League, 1.5 games behind the pennant leading New York Giants. Following the strong start of the season, Cincinnati lost nine of their next 13 games, dropping to 10-13 and slipping into fifth place.

On May 31, the Reds purchased pitcher Bill Hallahan from the St. Louis Cardinals. Hallahan, who had spent ten seasons with the Cardinals, had a 2-2 record with a 6.32 ERA with the club in 1936. His career record with St. Louis was 93-68 with a 3.82 ERA in 259 games. In 1931, he led the National League with 19 victories. On the same date, Cincinnati sold pitcher Tony Freitas to the Cardinals. Freitas had a 0-2 record with a 1.29 ERA in four games with the Reds.

Cincinnati had a very solid month of June, as by the end of the month, the club had a record of 36-30, however, the Reds remained in fifth place, five games out of first place behind the St. Louis Cardinals and Chicago Cubs, who were tied for first place.

The club struggled in July, posting a record of 11-18 during the month, dropping their overall record under .500 to 47-48. Cincinnati was still in fifth place, but was now 11.5 games out of first.

On August 2, the Reds traded pitcher Si Johnson to the St. Louis Cardinals for pitcher Bill Walker. Johnson, who had played with Cincinnati since 1928, appeared in only two games with the Reds in 1936. He played most of his games with the Reds AA affiliate, the Toronto Maple Leafs, where he posted a 10-9 record with a 2.38 ERA in 26 games. Walker posted a 5-5 record with a 5.50 ERA in 19 games with the Cardinals in 1936. The Reds assigned Walker to Toronto for the remainder of the season. Walker had previously pitched with the New York Giants, where he led the NL with the lowest ERA in 1929 at 3.09, and again in 1931 at 2.26.

Cincinnati continued to struggle in August, as by the end of the month, the club had a 60-65 record, remaining in fifth place, but falling to 17.5 games out of first. During September, the Reds sent pitcher Bill Walker back to the Cardinals in an unknown transaction.

The Reds had a strong start to the month of September, earning a 10-5 record in their first 15 games to reach the .500 mark. In the middle of the month, Cincinnati would go on a nine game losing streak, eliminating their chance of finishing above .500. Overall, the club finished the 1936 season with a record of 74-80, 18 games behind the pennant winning New York Giants.

Offensively, the Reds were led by outfielder Kiki Cuyler, who in his first full season with the club, batted .326 with seven home runs, 74 RBI and 16 stolen bases in 144 games. Catcher Ernie Lombardi led Cincinnati with a .333 batting average and 12 home runs, while driving in 68 runs in 121 games. Outfielder Ival Goodman hit .284 with a team high 17 home runs and tied Cuyler for the RBI lead with 74 in 136 games. Rookie first baseman Les Scarsella hit .313 with three home runs and 65 RBI in 115 games.

Paul Derringer anchored the pitching staff, earning a record of 19-19 with a 4.02 ERA in 51 games played. His 282.1 innings pitched and 121 strikeouts led the Reds. Al Hollingsworth earned a record of 9-10 with a 4.16 ERA in 29 games, while Gene Schott had a record of 11-11 with a team best 3.80 ERA in 31 games.

The 74 victories and .481 winning percentage represented the Reds highest total since 1928, when they won 78 games and finished with a .513 winning percentage. The Reds attendance of 466,345 was an increase of nearly 20,000 from the 1935 season, and was the highest since 1928, when the Reds drew 490,490 fans.

=== Season standings ===
National League
| Team | W | L | Pct. | GB | Home | Road |
|---|---|---|---|---|---|---|
| New York Giants | 92 | 62 | .597 | — | 52‍–‍26 | 40‍–‍36 |
| St. Louis Cardinals | 87 | 67 | .565 | 5 | 43‍–‍33 | 44‍–‍34 |
| Chicago Cubs | 87 | 67 | .565 | 5 | 50‍–‍27 | 37‍–‍40 |
| Pittsburgh Pirates | 84 | 70 | .545 | 8 | 46‍–‍30 | 38‍–‍40 |
| Cincinnati Reds | 74 | 80 | .481 | 18 | 42‍–‍34 | 32‍–‍46 |
| Boston Bees | 71 | 83 | .461 | 21 | 35‍–‍43 | 36‍–‍40 |
| Brooklyn Dodgers | 67 | 87 | .435 | 25 | 37‍–‍40 | 30‍–‍47 |
| Philadelphia Phillies | 54 | 100 | .351 | 38 | 30‍–‍48 | 24‍–‍52 |

=== Record vs. opponents ===
1936 National League record Sources:
| Team | BSN | BRO | CHC | CIN | NYG | PHI | PIT | STL |
|---|---|---|---|---|---|---|---|---|
| Boston | — | 10–12–2 | 6–16 | 13–9 | 9–13 | 12–10 | 8–14–1 | 13–9 |
| Brooklyn | 12–10–2 | — | 7–15 | 9–13 | 9–13 | 12–10 | 9–13 | 9–13 |
| Chicago | 16–6 | 15–7 | — | 10–12 | 11–11 | 16–6 | 10–12 | 9–13 |
| Cincinnati | 9–13 | 13–9 | 12–10 | — | 9–13 | 13–9 | 8–14 | 10–12 |
| New York | 13–9 | 13–9 | 11–11 | 13–9 | — | 17–5 | 15–7 | 10–12 |
| Philadelphia | 10–12 | 10–12 | 6–16 | 9–13 | 5–17 | — | 7–15 | 7–15 |
| Pittsburgh | 14–8–1 | 13–9 | 12–10 | 14–8 | 7–15 | 15–7 | — | 9–13–1 |
| St. Louis | 9–13 | 13–9 | 13–9 | 12–10 | 12–10 | 15–7 | 13–9–1 | — |

=== Roster ===
1936 Cincinnati Reds
Roster
| Pitchers: 28 Don Brennan; 32 Peaches Davis; 25 Paul Derringer; 26 Tony Freitas; 22 Benny Frey; 32 Lee Grissom; 24 Bill Hallahan; 31 Whitey Hilcher; 19 Al Hollingsworth; 24 Si Johnson; 27 Dee Moore; 35 Whitey Moore; 39 Jake Mooty; 27,31 Emmett Nelson; 20 Gene Schott; 21 Lee Stine | Catchers: 1 Gilly Campbell; 2 Ernie Lombardi; Infielders: 15 Lee Handley; 17 Eddie Joost; 3 Alex Kampouris; 11 George McQuinn; 13 Eddie Miller; 5 Billy Myers; 9 Lew Riggs; 11 Les Scarsella; 17 Tommy Thevenow | Outfielders: 8 Sammy Byrd; 14 Calvin Chapman; 4 Kiki Cuyler; 10 Ival Goodman; 6 Babe Herman; 16 Hub Walker | Manager: 7 Chuck Dressen; Coaches: 30 George Kelly; 29 Tom Sheehan; 12 Ivy Wingo |

== Player stats ==
=== Batting ===
==== Starters by position ====
Note: Pos = Position; G = Games played; AB = At bats; H = Hits; Avg. = Batting average; HR = Home runs; RBI = Runs batted in

| Pos | Player | G | AB | H | Avg. | HR | RBI |
|---|---|---|---|---|---|---|---|
| C | Ernie Lombardi | 121 | 387 | 129 | .333 | 12 | 68 |
| 1B | Les Scarsella | 115 | 485 | 152 | .313 | 3 | 65 |
| 2B | Alex Kampouris | 122 | 355 | 85 | .239 | 5 | 46 |
| SS | Billy Myers | 98 | 323 | 87 | .269 | 6 | 27 |
| 3B | Lew Riggs | 141 | 538 | 138 | .257 | 6 | 57 |
| OF | Ival Goodman | 136 | 489 | 139 | .284 | 17 | 71 |
| OF | Babe Herman | 119 | 380 | 106 | .279 | 13 | 71 |
| OF | Kiki Cuyler | 144 | 567 | 185 | .326 | 7 | 74 |

==== Other batters ====
Note: G = Games played; AB = At bats; H = Hits; Avg. = Batting average; HR = Home runs; RBI = Runs batted in

| Player | G | AB | H | Avg. | HR | RBI |
|---|---|---|---|---|---|---|
| Tommy Thevenow | 106 | 321 | 75 | .234 | 0 | 36 |
| Hub Walker | 92 | 258 | 71 | .275 | 4 | 23 |
| Gilly Campbell | 89 | 235 | 63 | .268 | 1 | 40 |
| Calvin Chapman | 96 | 219 | 54 | .247 | 1 | 22 |
| Samuel Byrd | 59 | 141 | 35 | .248 | 2 | 13 |
| George McQuinn | 38 | 134 | 27 | .201 | 0 | 13 |
| Lee Handley | 24 | 78 | 24 | .308 | 2 | 8 |
| Eddie Joost | 13 | 26 | 4 | .154 | 0 | 1 |
| Eddie Miller | 5 | 10 | 1 | .100 | 0 | 0 |
| Dee Moore | 6 | 10 | 4 | .400 | 0 | 1 |

=== Pitching ===
==== Starting pitchers ====
Note: G = Games pitched; IP = Innings pitched; W = Wins; L = Losses; ERA = Earned run average; SO = Strikeouts

| Player | G | IP | W | L | ERA | SO |
|---|---|---|---|---|---|---|
| Paul Derringer | 51 | 282.1 | 19 | 19 | 4.02 | 21 |
| Al Hollingsworth | 29 | 184.0 | 9 | 10 | 4.16 | 76 |
| Gene Schott | 31 | 180.0 | 11 | 11 | 3.80 | 65 |
| Bill Hallahan | 23 | 135.0 | 5 | 9 | 4.33 | 32 |

==== Other pitchers ====
Note: G = Games pitched; IP = Innings pitched; W = Wins; L = Losses; ERA = Earned run average; SO = Strikeouts

| Player | G | IP | W | L | ERA | SO |
|---|---|---|---|---|---|---|
| Benny Frey | 31 | 131.1 | 10 | 8 | 4.25 | 20 |
| Peaches Davis | 26 | 125.2 | 8 | 8 | 3.58 | 32 |
| Lee Stine | 40 | 121.2 | 3 | 8 | 5.03 | 26 |
| Lee Grissom | 6 | 24.1 | 1 | 1 | 6.29 | 13 |
| Emmett Nelson | 6 | 17.0 | 1 | 0 | 3.18 | 3 |
| Dee Moore | 2 | 7.0 | 0 | 0 | 0.00 | 3 |

==== Relief pitchers ====
Note: G = Games pitched; W = Wins; L = Losses; SV = Saves; ERA = Earned run average; SO = Strikeouts

| Player | G | W | L | SV | ERA | SO |
|---|---|---|---|---|---|---|
| Don Brennan | 41 | 5 | 2 | 9 | 4.39 | 40 |
| Whitey Hilcher | 14 | 1 | 2 | 0 | 6.17 | 10 |
| Jake Mooty | 8 | 0 | 0 | 1 | 3.95 | 11 |
| Tony Freitas | 4 | 0 | 2 | 0 | 1.29 | 1 |
| Si Johnson | 2 | 0 | 0 | 0 | 13.50 | 2 |
| Whitey Moore | 1 | 1 | 0 | 0 | 5.40 | 4 |

== Farm system ==
| Level | Team | League | Manager |
|---|---|---|---|
| AA | Toronto Maple Leafs | International League | Ike Boone |
| A1 | Nashville Vols | Southern Association | Lance Richbourg |
| B | Durham Bulls | Piedmont League | Johnny Gooch |
| B | Macon Peaches | Sally League | Possum Whitted and Milt Stock |
| C | El Dorado Lions | Cotton States League | Frank O'Rourke |
| C | Marshall Orphans/Tigers | East Texas League | Harvey Albrecht, Tex Nugent and Bama Jones |
| D | Siloam Springs Travelers | Arkansas–Missouri League | Ray Powell |
| D | Mt. Airy Reds | Bi-State League | Mickey Shader, El Conway and Frank Packard |
| D | DeLand Reds | Florida State League | Lester "Pat" Patterson |
| D | Cordele Reds | Georgia–Florida League | Ivy Griffin |
| D | Paducah Indians | KITTY League | Ben Tincup |
| D | Lincoln Red Links | Nebraska State League | Pid Purdy |
| D | Fremont Reds | Ohio State League | Marty Purtell |

LEAGUE CHAMPIONS: El Dorado, Siloam Springs

Lincoln club folded, July 16, 1936
