= 1937 Cincinnati Reds season =

1937 Cincinnati Reds
- League: National League
- Ballpark: Crosley Field
- City: Cincinnati
- Owners: Powel Crosley Jr.
- General managers: Warren Giles
- Managers: Chuck Dressen, Bobby Wallace
- Radio: WCPO (Harry Hartman); WSAI (Red Barber, Dick Bray)

The 1937 Cincinnati Reds season was a season in American baseball. The team finished eighth and last in the National League with a record of 56–98, 40 games behind the New York Giants.

== Offseason ==
On December 2, 1936, the Reds purchased catcher Spud Davis and infielder Charlie Gelbert from the St. Louis Cardinals. Davis played in 112 games with the Cardinals during the 1936 season, hitting .273 with four home runs and 59 RBI. Gelbert hit .229 with three home runs and 27 RBI in 93 games during the 1936 season.

Just over two weeks later, on December 19, Cincinnati sold pitcher Lee Stine to the New York Yankees. Stine appeared in 40 games with the Reds during the 1936 season, including 12 starts. He posted a 3–8 record with a 5.03 ERA in 121.2 innings pitched in his only season with the club.

On January 6, 1937, Cincinnati sold infielder Tommy Thevenow to the New York Giants. Thevenow hit .234 with 36 RBI in 106 games in his lone season with the team.

Just prior to the beginning of the regular season, Cincinnati made a couple of moves. On April 16, the Reds sold outfielder Jack Rothrock to the Philadelphia Athletics. Rothrock, who was acquired by the Reds in August 1936, did not appear in a game with the team. Three days later, Cincinnati sold left fielder Babe Herman to the Detroit Tigers. In 119 games during the 1936 season, Herman hit for a .279 batting average with 13 home runs and 71 RBI.

== Regular season ==
The Reds opened the 1937 season at home against the St. Louis Cardinals on April 20, as the Cardinals, led by a 10 inning shutout pitching performance by Dizzy Dean defeated the Reds 2–0 in front of 34,374 fans.

Cincinnati struggled in their first 10 games of the season, posting a 1–9 record and quickly falling into the basement of the National League. The Reds snapped out of their early struggles, winning their next four games, including a wild 21–10 win over the Philadelphia Phillies on May 9.

On May 12, Cincinnati purchased first baseman Buck Jordan from the Boston Bees. Jordan had appeared in only eight games with the Bees at the time of the transaction, batting .250. In 1936, Jordan hit .323 with three home runs and 66 RBI in 138 games with Boston.

Cincinnati continued to struggled throughout the month of May, as at the end of the month, the team had a record of 11–25, remaining in last place, 12.5 games behind the National League leading Pittsburgh Pirates.

On June 6, the club purchased pitcher Jumbo Brown from the New York Yankees. Brown did not play in any games with the Yankees, as he was playing with their AA club, the Newark Bears of the International League. In 1936, Brown had a 1–4 record with a 5.91 ERA in 20 games with the Yankees.

Cincinnati put together a solid 13–8 record in their first 21 games during June, as the club moved into sixth place in the National League with a 24–33 record. The club then dropped their next five games, falling back into a tie for last place, with a 24–38 record, 14 games behind the pennant leading Chicago Cubs.

The Reds made a number of moves on July 3, as they sold pitcher Jumbo Brown and leftfielder Phil Weintraub to the New York Giants. Cincinnati also purchased pitcher Joe Cascarella from the Washington Senators. Cascarella had a 0–5 record with a 8.07 ERA in 32.1 innings pitched over ten games.

The team earned a record of 12–14 in July, as their record sat at 36–52 at the end of the month. Cincinnati sat in seventh place in the eight team league, 21 games behind the Chicago Cubs for first place.

The Reds purchased centerfielder Kiddo Davis from the New York Giants on August 4. Davis hit .263 with nine RBI in 56 games with the Giants. Later in the month, on August 20, Cincinnati purchased Dusty Cooke from the Boston Red Sox. Cooke hit .345 with 18 home runs in 151 games with the Minneapolis Millers of the International League.

Cincinnati struggled to a 10–17 record during the month of August, as the club dropped back into last place with a 46–69 record at the end of the month, 24.5 games behind the pennant leading Chicago Cubs and one game behind the Brooklyn Dodgers for seventh place.

On September 1, the Reds purchased third baseman Charlie English from the New York Yankees. English played with the Yankees AA club, the Kansas City Blues of the American Association. In 154 games, English hit .327 with 44 doubles and 15 triples. Three days later, the Reds made another purchase from the Yankees, as the acquired pitcher Ted Kleinhans. Kleinhans earned a 15–9 record with a 4.03 ERA in 37 games with the Blues during the 1937 season. Kleinhans had previously pitched for Cincinnati in 1934, as he earned a 2–6 record with a 5.74 ERA in 24 games.

Cincinnati continued to struggle in September. Following a doubleheader, in which the Reds split the two games with the St. Louis Cardinals on September 12, the club relieved Chuck Dressen from his duties as manager. Dressen finished the season with a 51–78 record. Overall, in four seasons with the team, Dressen earned a 214–282 record. His replacement for the rest of the season was Bobby Wallace. Wallace, who was generally recognized as the top shortstop in the American League during his tenure with the St. Louis Browns from 1902–11, had previous managing experience, as he was a player-manager with the Browns from 1911–12, where he earned a 57–134 record.

Under Wallace, the Reds limped to a 5–20 record, including finishing the regular season on a 14 game losing streak. Overall, Cincinnati finished the season with a 56–98 record, finishing in last place in the National League, 40 games behind the pennant winning New York Giants.

Offensively, catcher Ernie Lombardi led the Reds with a .334 batting average, as he added nine home runs and 59 RBI in 120 games. Second baseman Alex Kampouris hit .249 with a team-high 17 home runs and 71 RBI in 146 games. Rightfielder Ival Goodman led the team with 150 hits, as he batted .273 with 12 home runs and 55 RBI in 147 games, as well as tying for the team lead with 10 stolen bases. Outfielder Kiki Cuyler hit .271 with 32 RBI, as well as tying Goodman with a team high 10 stolen bases.

On the pitching staff, Lee Grissom emerged as the ace of the team. Grissom earned a 12–17 record with a 3.26 ERA in 50 games, as he led the club with 14 complete games, 149 strikeouts, and 223.2 innings pitched. Paul Derringer was 10–14 with a 4.04 ERA in 43 games, which included 12 complete games. Despite a record of 4–13, Gene Schott led the Reds with a team best ERA of 2.97 in 37 games.

The Reds 56–98 was the worst record by the club since the 1934 season, in which the club earned a 52–99 record. The club won 18 fewer games than they did in 1936, when Cincinnati earned a 74–80 record. This marked the sixth consecutive season in which the club had finished with a record under .500. Attendance dropped to 411,221, which was 55,124 fewer fans than the 1936 season, and the lowest season attendance since the 1934 season.

=== Season standings ===
National League
Team	W	L	Pct.	GB	Home	Road
New York Giants	95	57	.625	—	50‍–‍25	45‍–‍32
Chicago Cubs	93	61	.604	3	46‍–‍32	47‍–‍29
Pittsburgh Pirates	86	68	.558	10	46‍–‍32	40‍–‍36
St. Louis Cardinals	81	73	.526	15	45‍–‍33	36‍–‍40
Boston Bees	79	73	.520	16	43‍–‍33	36‍–‍40
Brooklyn Dodgers	62	91	.405	33½	36‍–‍39	26‍–‍52
Philadelphia Phillies	61	92	.399	34½	29‍–‍45	32‍–‍47
Cincinnati Reds	56	98	.364	40	28‍–‍51	28‍–‍47

=== Record vs. opponents ===
1937 National League record Sources:
Team	BSN	BRO	CHC	CIN	NYG	PHI	PIT	STL
Boston	—	15–7	9–13	11–11	10–10	14–8	11–11	9–13
Brooklyn	7–15	—	8–14	12–10–1	6–16	10–11	12–10	7–15–1
Chicago	13–9	14–8	—	14–8	12–10	14–8	9–13	17–5
Cincinnati	11–11	10–12–1	8–14	—	8–14	11–11	1–21	7–15
New York	10–10	16–6	10–12	14–8	—	15–7	16–6	14–8
Philadelphia	8–14	11–10	8–14	11–11	7–15	—	11–11	5–17–2
Pittsburgh	11–11	10–12	13–9	21–1	6–16	11–11	—	14–8
St. Louis	13–9	15–7–1	5–17	15–7	8–14	17–5–2	8–14	—

=== Roster ===
1937 Cincinnati Reds
Roster
Pitchers: 12 Red Barrett; 28 Don Brennan; 17 Jumbo Brown; 17 Joe Cascarella; 18 Peaches Davis; 25 Paul Derringer; 28 Paul Gehrman; 32 Lee Grissom; 21 Bill Hallahan; 19 Al Hollingsworth; 23 Ted Kleinhans; 23,36 Whitey Moore; 26 Jake Mooty; 20 Gene Schott; 27,31 Johnny Vander Meer	Catchers: 1,38 Gus Brittain; 35 Gilly Campbell; 7 Harry Chozen; 24 Spud Davis; 2 Ernie Lombardi; 1 Dee Moore; Infielders: 31 Charlie English; 8 Charlie Gelbert; 22 Eddie Joost; 34 Buck Jordan; 3 Alex Kampouris; 12,30 Frank McCormick; 33 Eddie Miller; 5 Billy Myers; 6 Jimmy Outlaw; 9 Lew Riggs; 11 Les Scarsella	Outfielders: 15 Harry Craft; 4 Kiki Cuyler; 8 Kiddo Davis; 10 Ival Goodman; 14 Chick Hafey; 29 Pinky Jorgensen; 37 Dutch Mele; 16 Hub Walker; 15 Phil Weintraub; Other batters: 17 Joe Dwyer; 26 Arnie Moser	Manager: 7 Chuck Dressen; 40 Bobby Wallace; Coaches: 30 George Kelly; 29 Tom Sheehan

== Player stats ==
=== Batting ===
==== Starters by position ====
Note: Pos = Position; G = Games played; AB = At bats; H = Hits; Avg. = Batting average; HR = Home runs; RBI = Runs batted in

Pos	Player	G	AB	H	Avg.	HR	RBI
C	Ernie Lombardi	120	368	123	.334	9	59
1B	Buck Jordan	98	316	89	.282	1	28
2B	Alex Kampouris	146	458	114	.249	17	71
SS	Billy Myers	124	335	84	.251	7	43
3B	Lew Riggs	122	384	93	.242	6	45
OF	Chick Hafey	89	257	67	.261	9	41
OF	Ival Goodman	147	549	150	.273	12	55
OF	Kiki Cuyler	117	406	110	.271	0	32

==== Other batters ====
Note: G = Games played; AB = At bats; H = Hits; Avg. = Batting average; HR = Home runs; RBI = Runs batted in

Player	G	AB	H	Avg.	HR	RBI
Les Scarsella	110	329	81	.246	3	34
Hub Walker	78	221	55	.249	1	19
Spud Davis	76	209	56	.268	3	33
Phil Weintraub	49	177	48	.271	3	20
Jimmy Outlaw	49	165	45	.273	0	11
Kiddo Davis	40	136	35	.257	1	5
Charlie Gelbert	43	114	22	.193	1	13
Frank McCormick	24	83	27	.325	0	9
Charlie English	17	63	15	.238	0	4
Eddie Miller	36	60	9	.150	0	5
Harry Craft	10	42	13	.310	0	4
Gilly Campbell	18	40	11	.275	0	2
Pinky Jorgensen	6	14	4	.286	0	1
Dutch Mele	6	14	2	.143	0	1
Dee Moore	7	13	1	.077	0	0
Eddie Joost	6	12	1	.083	0	0
Joe Dwyer	12	11	3	.273	0	1
Gus Brittain	3	6	1	.167	0	0
Arnie Moser	5	5	0	.000	0	0
Harry Chozen	1	4	1	.250	0	0
Paul Derringer	43	80	16	.200	0	11
Peaches Davis	42	78	10	.128	0	2
Al Hollingsworth	46	76	19	.250	0	9
Lee Grissom	51	64	7	.109	0	0
Gene Schott	50	49	7	.143	0	4
Johnny Vander Meer	21	23	5	.217	0	0
Bill Hallahan	21	21	2	.095	0	2
Joe Cascarella	11	11	1	.091	0	1
Jake Mooty	15	8	0	.000	0	0
Whitey Moore	13	8	0	.000	0	0
Ted Kleinhans	7	8	2	.250	0	2
Don Brennan	10	5	0	.000	0	0
Red Barrett	1	3	0	.000	0	0
Paul Gehrman	2	3	0	.000	0	0
Jumbo Brown	4	2	0	.000	0	0

Pitchers batting data included in above table.

=== Pitching ===
==== Starting pitchers ====
Note: G = Games pitched; IP = Innings pitched; W = Wins; L = Losses; ERA = Earned run average; SO = Strikeouts

Player	G	IP	W	L	ERA	SO
Lee Grissom	50	223.2	12	17	3.26	149
Paul Derringer	43	222.2	10	14	4.04	94
Peaches Davis	42	218.0	11	13	3.59	59
Al Hollingsworth	43	202.1	9	15	3.91	74
John Vander Meer	19	84.1	3	5	3.84	52

==== Other pitchers ====
Note: G = Games pitched; IP = Innings pitched; W = Wins; L = Losses; ERA = Earned run average; SO = Strikeouts

Player	G	IP	W	L	ERA	SO
Joe Cascarella	11	43.2	1	2	3.92	16
Ted Kleinhans	7	27.1	1	2	2.30	12
Don Brennan	10	16.0	1	1	6.75	6
Jumbo Brown	4	9.2	1	0	8.38	4
Paul Gehrman	2	9.1	0	1	2.89	1
Red Barrett	1	6.1	0	0	1.42	1

==== Relief pitchers ====
Note: G = Games pitched; W = Wins; L = Losses; SV = Saves; ERA = Earned run average; SO = Strikeouts

Player	G	W	L	SV	ERA	SO
Gene Schott	37	4	13	1	2.97	56
Bill Hallahan	21	3	9	0	6.14	18
Jake Mooty	14	0	3	1	8.31	11
Whitey Moore	13	0	3	0	4.89	27

== Farm system ==
Level	Team	League	Manager
AA	Syracuse Chiefs	International League	Bernard "Mike" Kelly
A	Albany Senators	New York–Pennsylvania League	Bill McCorry
B	Waterloo Red Hawks	Western League	Lenny Backer
B	Durham Bulls	Piedmont League	Paul O'Malley
B	Peoria Reds	Illinois–Indiana–Iowa League	Ben Tincup and Wayne Blackburn
C	Muskogee Reds	Western Association	Bill Hughes
D	Bisbee Bees	Arizona–Texas League	Mickey Shader
D	DeLand Reds	Florida State League	Lester "Pat" Patterson
D	Fremont Reds	Ohio State League	Hap Bohl
