= Billy Raimondi =

American baseball player

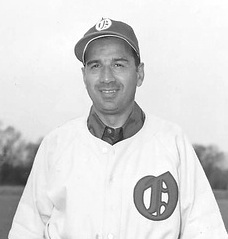
- Raimondi c. 1947
- Catcher
- Born: December 1, 1912; San Francisco, California, U.S.
- Died: October 18, 2010 (aged 97); Alameda, California, U.S.
- Batted: Right Threw: Right
- Stats at Baseball Reference

Teams
- As player: Oakland Oaks (1932–1935, 1937–1949); Sacramento Solons (1949–1950); Los Angeles Angels (1951–1953); As manager: Oakland Oaks (1945); Magic Valley Cowboys (1956)

Member of the Pacific Coast League

Baseball Hall of Fame
- Induction: 1951

William Louis Raimondi (December 1, 1912 – October 18, 2010) was an American professional baseball catcher. He played in Minor League Baseball for 22 years, including 21 years in the Pacific Coast League (PCL). He played for the Oakland Oaks from 1932 to 1949, the Sacramento Solons from 1949 to 1950, and the Los Angeles Angels from 1951 to 1953. Raimondi is a member of the PCL Hall of Fame, elected in 1951.

Raimondi was born and raised in the San Francisco Bay Area. After a standout baseball career at McClymonds High School in Oakland, California, Raimondi signed with the Oaks of the PCL. He tried out with the Cincinnati Reds for the 1936 season, but an arm injury prevented him from playing in Major League Baseball (MLB). Raimondi returned to the Oaks in 1937, and declined further opportunities from MLB clubs to stay close to home. He served as the interim manager of the Oaks during the 1945 season. A year after winning the PCL championship with the 1948 Oaks under Casey Stengel, Chuck Dressen traded Raimondi to Sacramento, where he became a player-coach during the 1950 season. Signing with the Angels in 1951, Raimondi served as a backup catcher and coach through the 1953 season, when he retired.

After his playing career, Raimondi served as a scout for the Chicago Cubs organization and managed the Magic Valley Cowboys for part of the 1956 season. He lived in Alameda, California, for the remainder of his life.

== Early life ==
Raimondi was born in San Francisco, California, on December 1, 1912, and lived in North Beach. At the age of two, his family moved to the West Oakland neighborhood of Oakland, California, where he grew up. His father worked as a shoeshiner and his mother worked in a cannery. The Raimondis had six sons and one daughter.

Raimondi began playing baseball as an outfielder when he attended Thompkins Grammar School at the age of 12. He was recruited to play as a semi-professional, and became a catcher one day when the regular catcher was absent. He got over his original dislike of the position and played it regularly. When Raimondi attended McClymonds High School in Oakland, California, he quit playing as a semi-professional to play for the school's baseball team. He was named All-City for two seasons. In 1931, while he was in high school, his father died in a hit and run collision in West Oakland. Raimondi signed his first baseball contract to help support his family.

== Career ==
=== 1931–1937 ===
Bernie DeViveiros, who played shortstop for the Oakland Oaks of the Pacific Coast League (PCL) and managed Raimondi's semi-professional team, recommended Raimondi to Oaks' management. Raimondi attended spring training with the Oaks in 1931. They assigned him to their farm team, the Phoenix Senators of the Class D Arizona–Texas League, for the season. In 75 games played, Raimondi had a .304 batting average. In 1932, the Oaks assigned Raimondi to the Bisbee Bees of the Arizona–Texas League. After Raimondi batted .312 in 73 games for Bisbee, the league collapsed due to the Great Depression. The Oaks released Alex Gaston so they could recall Raimondi, and he caught 45 of the Oaks' 60 remaining games.

Raimondi opened the 1933 season as the backup catcher to Pat Veltman, and batted .289 in 101 games. The Pittsburgh Pirates of the National League (NL) acquired Veltman before the 1934 season, leaving Raimondi as the Oaks' only catcher until they acquired Johnny Pasek from the Chicago White Sox of the American League (AL) in May. The White Sox recalled Pasek in July. Raimondi batted .284 while he caught 156 of Oakland's 189 games for the 1934 season. Oakland signed Hugh McMullen in September 1934 to help finish the season and to backup Raimondi for the 1935 season. Raimondi batted .256 in 1935.

The AL's New York Yankees had a working arrangement with the Oaks for the 1935 season, giving them an option on Oakland's players. The Yankees exercised their option on Raimondi after the 1935 season, and then conditionally sold him and George McQuinn to the NL's Cincinnati Reds for $25,000 ($587,075 in current dollar terms). He went to spring training with the Reds, who also had Ernie Lombardi, Gilly Campbell, and Hank Erickson as catchers. Raimondi's throwing arm was not in condition at the start of the 1936 season, and the Reds returned him to the Yankees. After he missed the entire 1936 season, the Yankees optioned Raimondi to the Oaks before the 1937 season. He spent the 1937 season as Oakland's first-string catcher, catching 107 games. After the 1937 season, the Yankees reassigned Oaks' manager Billy Meyer to the Kansas City Blues of the American Association; Meyer requested Raimondi join him, but Raimondi preferred to stay in Oakland. Though the PCL's Los Angeles Angels and San Francisco Seals sought to acquire Raimondi from the Yankees, the Oaks bought his contractual rights outright.

=== 1938–1948 ===
In 1938, the Oaks acquired Bill Conroy to share catching duties with Raimondi. They played together in 1939 and 1940 as well. Raimondi batted .304 in the 1939 season. In 1940, Raimondi caught 103 games, including almost 30 consecutively while Conroy was out with an injured finger. Raimondi wore down over the season, finishing with a .237 batting average. He gained an additional 10 pounds (4.5 kg) to increase his durability for the 1941 season, and he batted .283 for the year. With Conroy drafted by the Boston Red Sox after the season, Raimondi was paired with Joe Glenn for the 1942 season. Raimondi also played as a right fielder during the 1942 season when Fred Tauby left the team to join the United States Navy. In 132 games in 1943, Raimondi batted .277.

The Oaks fired Dolph Camilli, their manager, in June 1945 and named Raimondi their interim manager. The Oaks finished the season in fifth place, and they hired Casey Stengel to succeed Raimondi as manager. Raimondi batted .300 in 1946. The NL's Chicago Cubs tried to acquire Raimondi to serve as their third catcher before the 1947 season, but he decided that it was not worth it for him to move his family. He batted .297 in 152 games in 1947.

In 1948, Raimondi batted .285 in 126 games played. However, he broke his wrist when he collided with the first baseman of the San Diego Padres during a mid-September game, ending his season. The 1948 Oaks won the PCL championship. The team was known as the "Nine Old Men", as Lombardi was 40, Raimondi, Cookie Lavagetto, Floyd Speer, and Nick Etten were 35, Jack Salveson and Les Scarsella were 34, Dario Lodigiani was 32, and Mel Duezabou was 30.

=== 1949–1953 ===
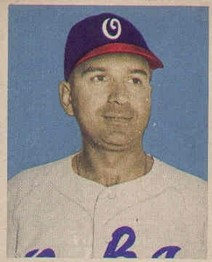
A 1949 Bowman Gum baseball card of Billy Raimondi.

In 1949, Charlie Dressen succeeded Stengel as the Oaks' manager, and Don Padgett was brought in to catch alongside Raimondi. Though Raimondi began the year as the starting catcher, Padgett began to receive more playing time than Raimondi as the season progressed. Dressen and Raimondi did not get along, and the Oaks traded Raimondi to the Sacramento Solons for Frank Kerr in June 1949, upsetting the fans and resulting in bad press for Dressen. Raimondi batted .272 for Oakland and .263 for Sacramento. He had the second-best fielding percentage among PCL catchers in 1949, trailing only Mike Sandlock of the Hollywood Stars.

Raimondi shared catching duties for Sacramento with Red Steiner in 1950. In June 1950, the Solons fired manager Red Kress and coach Lindsay Brown. The Solons hired Joe Marty as their new manager, and Marty chose Raimondi to serve as a player-coach. Raimondi batted .242 in 110 games in 1950, spending time on the injured list. Belieiving that Raimondi could not be relied upon as a starting catcher, and having acquired Vinnie Smith and Al Lakeman to pair with Steiner, Sacramento released Raimondi after the 1950 season. In 1951, Raimondi signed with the Los Angeles Angels. He opened the season as the Angels' regular catcher, but began to lose playing time by late April, after the Angels acquired Les Peden. In May 1951, he was elected to the PCL Hall of Fame. Angels' manager Stan Hack had Raimondi catch Bill Moisan's starts. Raimondi played in 52 games during the 1951 season, batting .290.

Raimondi returned to the Angels as a backup to Peden in 1952, but was removed from the active roster in June. He remained with the Angels as a coach, though he was activated in July while Peden recovered from an injury. Peden began the 1953 season with the Washington Senators of the AL, and Raimondi was brought back to the active roster to share catching duties with El Tappe and Al Evans. At the end of April, the Angels again deactivated Raimondi and had him serve as a coach. The Angels released Raimondi after the 1953 season. He finished his PCL career with a .274 batting average, 1,937 hits, 99 stolen bases, seven home runs, and 212 strikeouts in 6,532 at bats and 2,041 games caught.

== Post-playing career ==
In 1956, Raimondi joined the Cubs as a scout, focusing on Northern California. In July, the Cubs named him the manager of the Magic Valley Cowboys of the Class C Pioneer League, following Al Zarilla's resignation. After the season, he returned to scouting. The Cubs released Raimondi after the 1957 season. He became a life insurance salesman and also worked in circulation for the Oakland Tribune for ten years.

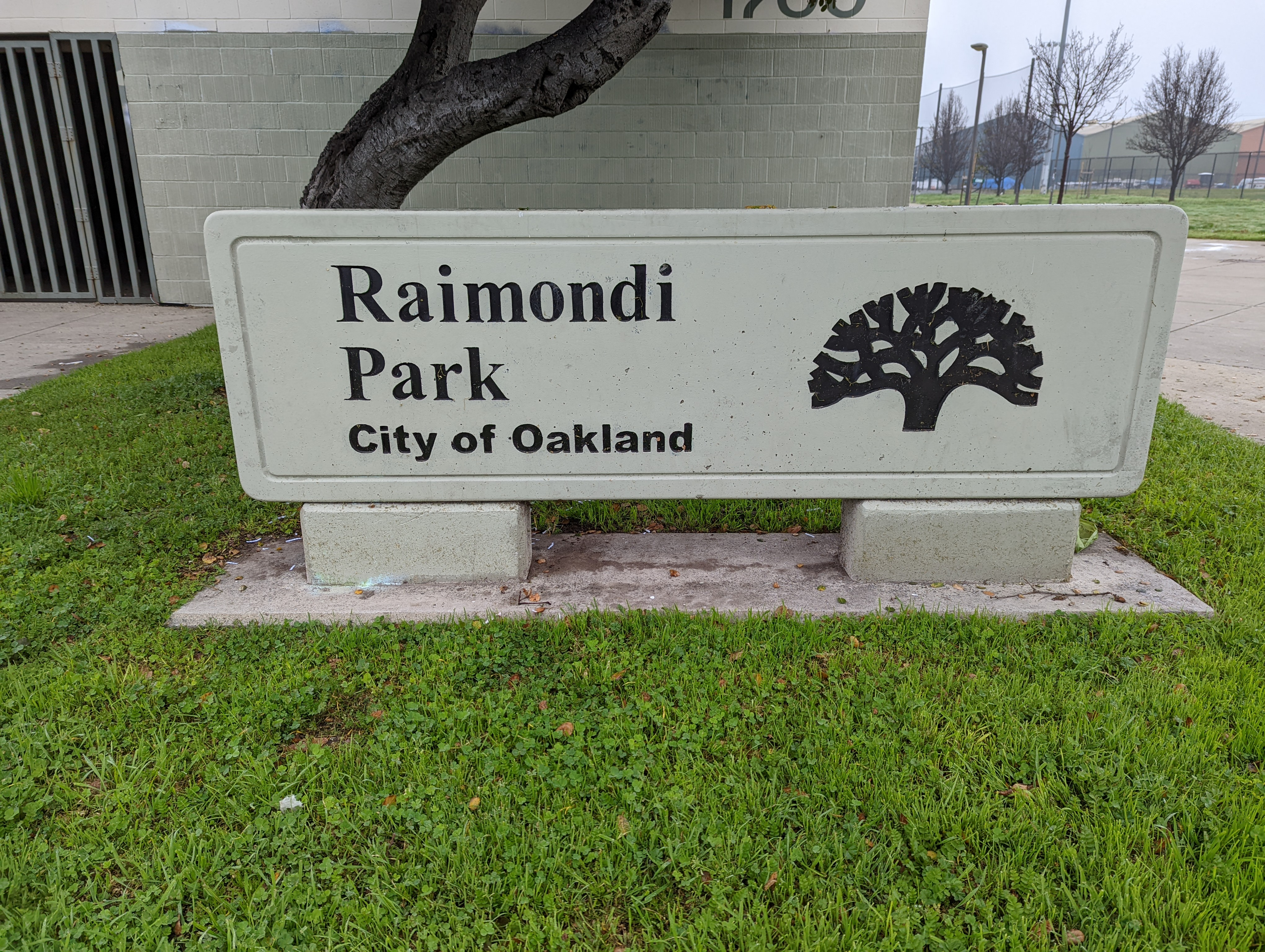
Raimondi Park in West Oakland

== Personal life ==
Raimondi's brothers Al, Ernie, and Walt played in the PCL. Al played for the Oaks and the Mission Reds, Walt played for the Oaks, and Ernie played for the Oaks and the Seals. In 1947, the Oakland City Council approved a resolution renaming Bayview Park to Raimondi Park after Ernie Raimondi, who was killed in action in World War II.

Raimondi met Frances Palermo through Cookie Lavagetto, who was a mutual friend, in 1936. They married in a secret ceremony in Carson City, Nevada, in 1937 and had a second wedding ceremony for their families in 1938. They moved to Alameda, California, in 1940, and had three children.

Raimondi died at his home in Alameda on October 18, 2010.
