= Emmett Nelson =

American baseball player (1905–1967)

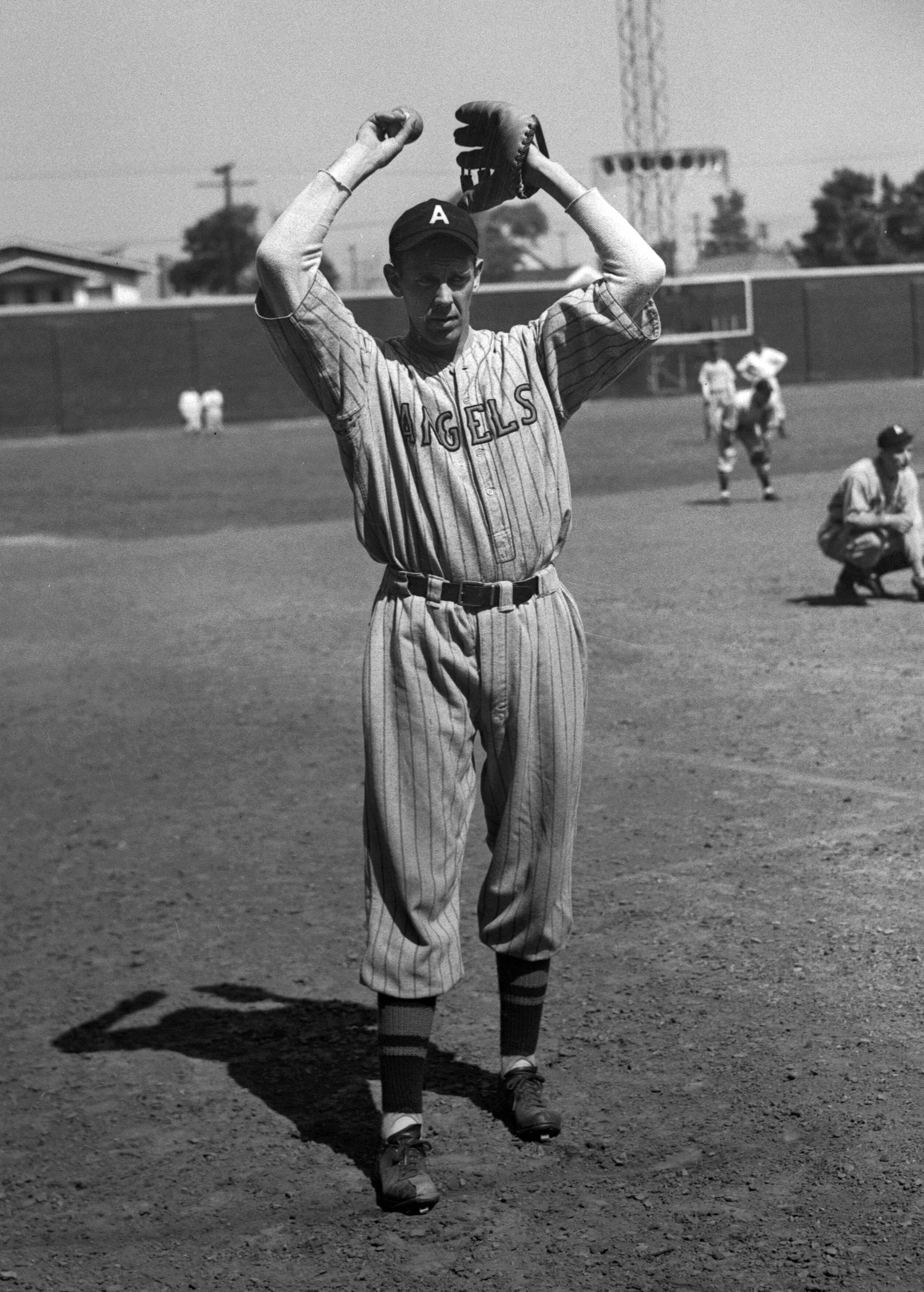
- Nelson as a member of the Los Angeles Angels
- Pitcher
- Born: February 26, 1905; Viborg, South Dakota, U.S.
- Died: August 25, 1967 (aged 62); Sioux Falls, South Dakota, U.S.
- Batted: Right Threw: Right

MLB debut
- June 24, 1935, for the Cincinnati Reds

Last MLB appearance
- July 28, 1936, for the Cincinnati Reds

MLB statistics
- Win–loss record: 5–4
- Earned run average: 4.07
- Strikeouts: 17
- Stats at Baseball Reference

Teams
- Cincinnati Reds (1935–1936)

George Emmett Nelson (February 26, 1905 – August 25, 1967) nicknamed "Ramrod", was a pitcher in Major League Baseball. He made 25 appearances, including eight starts, for the Cincinnati Reds during the 1935 and 1936 seasons.
