= Lee Grissom =

American baseball player (1907–1998)

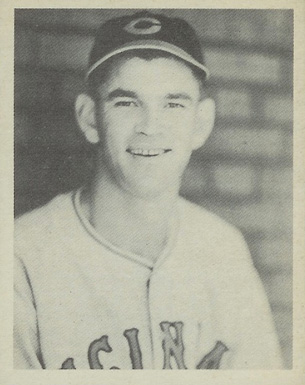
- Pitcher
- Born: October 23, 1907; Sherman, Texas, U.S.
- Died: October 4, 1998 (aged 90); Corning, California, U.S.
- Batted: Switch Threw: Left

MLB debut
- September 2, 1934, for the Cincinnati Reds

Last MLB appearance
- September 24, 1941, for the Philadelphia Phillies

MLB statistics
- Win–loss record: 29–48
- Earned run average: 3.89
- Strikeouts: 384
- Stats at Baseball Reference

Teams
- Cincinnati Reds (1934–1939); New York Yankees (1940); Brooklyn Dodgers (1940–1941); Philadelphia Phillies (1941)

Career highlights and awards
- All-Star (1937)

Lee Theo Grissom (October 23, 1907 – October 4, 1998) was an American professional baseball player. A left-handed pitcher, Grissom played in Major League Baseball between 1934 and 1941 for the Cincinnati Reds, New York Yankees, Brooklyn Dodgers and Philadelphia Phillies. Born in Sherman, Texas, and raised in Red Bluff, California, Grissom stood 6 feet 3 inches (1.91 m) tall and weighed 200 pounds (91 kg).

== Career ==
Grissom originally played baseball in the local Farm Bureau League when a local scout spotted him and signed him to a professional contract. He pitched for the Mission Reds in the Pacific Coast League in 1933, where he was then discovered by Charles E. Chapman, a college scouter for the Reds, and was signed before the 1934 season to a contract by Cincinnati general manager Larry MacPhail to play for the Reds.

Born in Sherman, Texas, Grissom made his debut with the Reds on September 2, 1934, against the Pittsburgh Pirates. He pitched four games in 1934, and in 1935 he started three games, winning and losing one each. During the 1935 season, he was recognized by The Sporting News as a "Minor Worth Watching". He continued to move between the majors and minors during these two seasons and in 1936. He played six games, starting four and pitching nearly 25 innings.

In 1937, Grissom had his best season, and became a regular on the pitching staff. Before the season started, however, he became well known as a result of a flood. In late January, Cincinnati had the worst flood in its history, with Crosley Field being covered by as much as 21 feet (6.4 m) of water. Grissom and Gene Schott rowed a boat out from the center field wall, and the resulting photo appeared across the country. During the season, he was selected to the All-Star Game in his only appearance, pitching an inning for the National League. He pitched in the bottom of the fifth inning, striking out Lou Gehrig and Earl Averill, yet surrendered doubles to Joe Cronin and Bill Dickey, with Cronin scoring a run on Dickey's hit, before ending the inning by making Sam West fly out. He finished the 1937 season with a record of 12–17, an earned run average of 3.26 and 149 strikeouts, and finished tied for 19th in the NL's MVP voting.

During the 1938 season, Grissom pitched 51 innings in 14 games. A blurb in the "Odds 'n Ends" section on the inside back cover of Action Comics #1, from 1938, mentions that Grissom is anxious to pitch both games of a doubleheader one day. However, his season ended abruptly when he broke his ankle trying to steal a base. In 1939, his final season as a Red, Grissom finished the season for the pennant-winning Reds with a 9–7 record, a 4.10 ERA, and over 150 innings pitched. He also pitched 1 1/3 innings during the 1939 World Series loss to the New York Yankees. After the 1939 season, he was traded to the Yankees for Joe Beggs, but went on to play only five games for New York. On May 15, 1940, Grissom was selected off waivers by the Brooklyn Dodgers. He started 10 games for them and finished the season with an ERA of 2.81. In 1941, Grissom played four games before he was traded by the Dodgers to the Philadelphia Phillies for Vito Tamulis. He played in 29 games for Philadelphia, and while he had an ERA of 2.97, he only earned a 2–13 record.

== Later life ==
After playing his last game on September 24, 1941, Grissom joined the military on June 6, 1942, and was originally assigned to the infantry and later to the United States Army Air Forces. He pitched for a base team under Burgess Whitehead and played for a semi-pro team in Colorado before being discharged in September 1945. He went on to work at his family's farm and pitch for local teams. In 1952 he was tried and acquitted of manslaughter for the death of a man during a barfight in which he participated. He died in Corning, California at age 90.

== Personal ==
His younger brother, Marv Grissom, was a major league pitcher and pitching coach during a long professional baseball career that extended from 1941 through 1978.
