= Chuck Dressen =

American baseball player, manager, and coach (1894–1966)

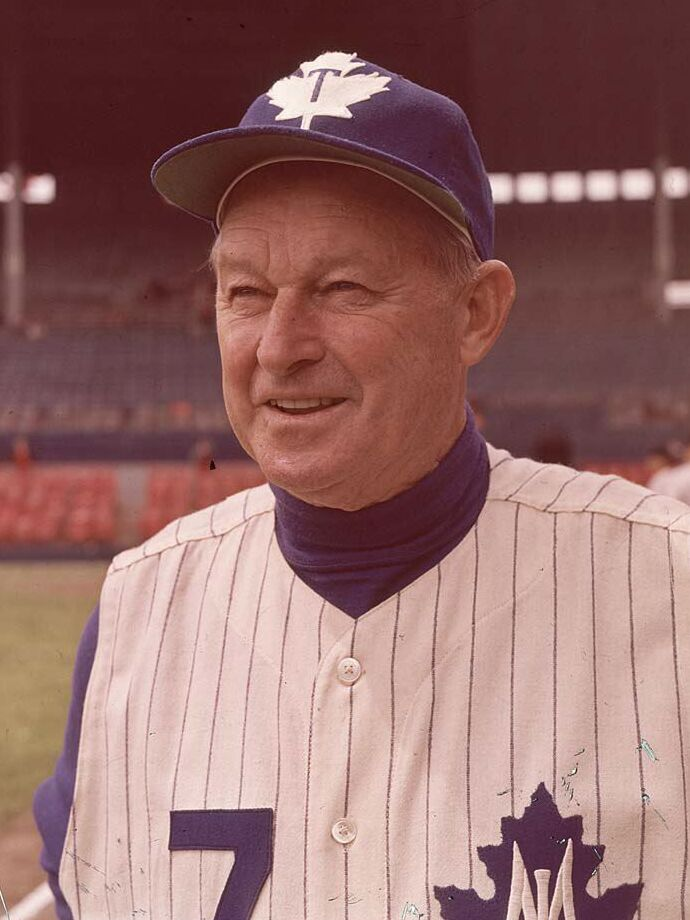
- Dressen, c. 1962
- Third baseman / Manager
- Born: September 20, 1894; Decatur, Illinois, U.S.
- Died: August 10, 1966 (aged 71); Detroit, Michigan, U.S.
- Batted: Right Threw: Right

MLB debut
- April 17, 1925, for the Cincinnati Reds

Last MLB appearance
- October 1, 1933, for the New York Giants

MLB statistics
- Batting average: .272
- Home runs: 11
- Runs batted in: 221
- Managerial record: 1,008–973
- Winning %: .509
- Stats at Baseball Reference
- Managerial record at Baseball Reference

Teams
- As player: Cincinnati Reds (1925–1931); New York Giants (1933); As manager: Cincinnati Reds (1934–1937); Brooklyn Dodgers (1951–1953); Washington Senators (1955–1957); Milwaukee Braves (1960–1961); Detroit Tigers (1963–1966); As coach: Brooklyn Dodgers (1939–1942, 1943–1946); New York Yankees (1947–1948); Los Angeles Dodgers (1958–1959)

Career highlights and awards
- 3× World Series champion (1933, 1947, 1959)

Charles Walter Dressen (pronounced: DREE-sen) (September 20, 1894 – August 10, 1966) was an American third baseman, manager and coach in professional baseball during a career lasting almost fifty years. He is best known as the manager of the Brooklyn Dodgers from 1951 to 1953, where he won two National League pennants. He threw and batted right-handed and was listed at 5 feet 5 inches (1.65 m) tall and 145 pounds (66 kg) during his days as an active player.

== NFL quarterback and MLB third baseman ==
Born in Decatur, Illinois, Dressen was a veteran baseball man when he took the reins in Brooklyn after the 1950 season. He began his professional career with the Moline Plowboys of the Class B Three-I League in 1919. Despite his small stature, Dressen also played professional football during his apprenticeship as a minor league baseball player. He was a quarterback for the Decatur Staleys (a forerunner of the Chicago Bears) in 1919–1920 and the Racine Legion of the National Football League in 1922–1923.

After he turned to baseball full-time in 1924, Dressen batted .346 in the top-level American Association, paving the way for his 646-game Major League Baseball playing career. Dressen played for the Cincinnati Reds from 1925 to 1931, and was the club's starting third baseman from 1926 to 1929. He also was a late-season member of the 1933 New York Giants. All told, he batted .272 with 603 hits in the majors.

Dressen's first opportunity to manage came in 1932 as the playing skipper of the Nashville Vols of the Southern Association. He interrupted that assignment late in 1933 to fill in as a third baseman for the Giants during the pennant drive when regular Johnny Vergez was forced out of the lineup because of appendicitis. Dressen started a dozen September games, batting .222.

Although he didn't play during the 1933 World Series, he helped the Giants win Game 4. With New York leading the game by a single run in the bottom of the 11th inning, the opposition Washington Senators loaded the bases with one out, and sent up rookie pinch hitter Cliff Bolton. On his own initiative, Dressen called time, ran from the dugout, and told Giants' first baseman and player-manager Bill Terry how to pitch and defend Bolton, against whom Dressen had managed in the Southern Association. Bolton promptly bounced into a double play and the Giants won to take a three-games-to-one lead in the Series, which they ultimately won in five games. The incident stamped Dressen as a potential major league manager.

== Association with Larry MacPhail ==
After rejoining Nashville at the outset of 1934 and resuming his successful minor league managerial career, Dressen was called to Cincinnati to manage the last-place Reds on July 29, 1934. The Reds rose as high as fifth place under him, winning 74 of 154 games in 1936, but when they fell back into the National League basement in 1937, Dressen was fired. He then returned to Nashville and managed the Vols to a second-place finish in 1938.

Despite his poor won-lost record (214–282, .431) in Cincinnati, Dressen made a valuable ally in the Reds’ mercurial general manager, Larry MacPhail. In 1939, a year after MacPhail became president and general manager of the Dodgers, he named fiery shortstop Leo Durocher player-manager and Dressen as his third base coach. Under MacPhail and Durocher, the Dodgers became a hard-playing pennant contender, winning Brooklyn's third NL pennant of the modern era in 1941. But when MacPhail resigned in October 1942 to rejoin the armed forces and was succeeded by Branch Rickey, Dressen was fired from Durocher's staff — reportedly because he refused to eschew betting on horses. He was on the sidelines for the first three months of the 1943 season before being rehired by the Dodgers that July.

As the Second World War was ending, MacPhail returned to baseball as part owner, president and general manager of the New York Yankees. Following the 1946 campaign, he raided the Dodger coaching staff, signing Dressen and Red Corriden as aides under his new manager, Bucky Harris. The raids contributed to a public feud between MacPhail on one side and Durocher and Rickey on the other. Commissioner of Baseball Albert B. Chandler suspended Durocher for the entire 1947 season for "conduct detrimental to baseball", suspended Dressen for 30 days for signing a Yankee contract while still an employee of the Dodgers, and fined both clubs and some of their employees.

MacPhail left baseball after the Yankees' 1947 World Series victory over the Dodgers, and Harris was sacked after the Bombers' third-place 1948 finish. Dressen was not retained by Harris' successor, Casey Stengel, but instead he replaced Stengel as the manager of the Oakland Oaks of the Triple-A Pacific Coast League. He skippered the Oaks in 1949–1950 and his teams finished second and first, winning 104 and 118 games during the PCL's elongated regular-season schedule. Simultaneously, a power struggle for control of the Dodgers ended in Walter O'Malley forcing Rickey out of the Brooklyn front office. When O'Malley fired Rickey associate Burt Shotton in the autumn of 1950, he chose Dressen to manage the 1951 Dodgers.

== Leader of Brooklyn's 'Boys of Summer' ==
Dressen's Dodgers, unlike his Reds of a decade and a half before, were a perennial contender in the National League, with a lineup that included five future members of the Baseball Hall of Fame — Roy Campanella, Gil Hodges, Pee Wee Reese, Jackie Robinson and Duke Snider. They had won pennants in 1947 and 1949, lost a playoff for the title in 1946, and come within a run of forcing another playoff for the 1950 National League pennant.

Brooklyn charged into first place early in the 1951 season, while the New York Giants — led since July 16, 1948, by Durocher himself — struggled (despite the callup of the 20-year-old rookie Willie Mays). When the Dodgers completed a three-game sweep of the Giants at Ebbets Field on August 10, the Brooklyn lead over the Giants reached 12 1/2 games. The following day, when Brooklyn won the first game of a doubleheader against the Boston Braves and the Giants fell to the Philadelphia Phillies, the Dodger lead stood, albeit briefly, at 13 1/2 games.

However, the Giants then began to win. With Sal Maglie, Larry Jansen and Jim Hearn anchoring their starting rotation — and (according to some accounts) with a "spy" stealing signs from their center-field clubhouse at their home field, the Polo Grounds — the Giants won sixteen in a row in August and 37 of their last 44 games (.841) while the Dodgers went 26–22 (.542) over the same period. At the end of the regular season, the teams were tied, necessitating a best-of-three game playoff to determine who won the league pennant. In the ninth inning of the decisive third game at the Polo Grounds, Dodger starting pitcher Don Newcombe had a 4–2 lead and two men on base when Dressen decided to go to the bullpen, where Carl Erskine and Ralph Branca were warming up. "Erskine is bouncing his curve", the manager was told by his bullpen coach, Clyde Sukeforth. Dressen summoned Branca, whose second pitch to Bobby Thomson was hit into the lower left-field stands for a three-run homer, a 5–4 Giants win, and a National League pennant — Baseball's "Shot Heard ‘Round the World".

Dressen kept his job in 1952 (Sukeforth resigned, while denying that the Branca decision was a factor in his departure) and for the next two seasons, the Dodgers dominated the National League, winning 201 regular-season games and capturing the pennant by margins of 4 1/2 and 13 lengths. But they came up short against Stengel's Yankees in the World Series both times, losing in seven games in 1952 and six in 1953. Fresh from winning the 1953 pennant with 105 regular-season victories, Dressen decided to publicly demand a three-year contract from O’Malley instead of the customary one-year deal the Dodgers then offered their managers. When O'Malley didn't yield, Dressen effectively resigned when the owner allowed his 1953 contract to expire. He was replaced by Triple-A Montreal Royals manager Walter Alston — a veteran minor leaguer who was then a relative unknown to Brooklyn fans and media. Alston went on to sign 23 consecutive one-year contracts with O'Malley, while winning seven Nationals League pennants, four World Series championships, and eventual induction in the Baseball Hall of Fame.

== Struggles in Washington and Milwaukee ==
Dressen returned to Oakland to manage the Oaks in 1954 while he sorted out his big-league future, then was hired to replace Bucky Harris at the helm of the Washington Senators, who had gone 66–88 to finish sixth in the eight-team American League in 1954.

Dressen inherited a second division team with a poor farm system. Nevertheless, baseball observers predicted that he would rouse the Senators from their doldrums with his managerial acumen. On September 30, 1954 (Season 5, Episode 3), Dressen himself appeared on the Groucho Marx quiz program, You Bet Your Life, and predicted that the Senators would finish in the first division (fourth place or higher). His former boss O'Malley said, "Dressen will steal at least six games for Washington in 1955." Dressen also told his team, "I guarantee we won't finish in sixth place again." He was right – but the 1955 Senators (53–101) finished eighth and last, the 1956 edition (59–95) finished seventh, and the 1957 club was 4–16 (and last again) on May 7, 1957, when Dressen was fired. His Senators won only 116 of 328 games — a winning percentage of .354. The team's next winning season would have to wait until 1962, after the franchise had become the Minnesota Twins.

After leaving Washington, Dressen rejoined the newly relocated Los Angeles Dodgers to serve as a coach under Alston in 1958 and 1959. When the 1959 Dodgers won the World Series, Dressen was in demand as a manager once again. The Dodgers' then-archrivals, the Milwaukee Braves, were seeking to replace Fred Haney, their veteran manager who stepped down after his club lost the 1959 National League tie-breaker series to Alston's Dodgers. The Braves (1957–1958) and Dodgers (1955–1956; 1959) dominated the late-1950s National League, winning every pennant over the last half of the decade. Milwaukee was only three victories short (two in 1956 and one in 1959) of four consecutive National League championships. On October 24, 1959, the Braves named Dressen their field boss for 1960.

Milwaukee's roster still boasted Hall of Famers Hank Aaron, Eddie Mathews and Warren Spahn. But the star players around them, including regulars Del Crandall, Joe Adcock, Bill Bruton, Wes Covington and Johnny Logan, and ace starting pitcher Lew Burdette, began to tail off in production, and the Braves' farm system could not keep up. Dressen was not able to reverse the Braves' slow decline to the middle of the pack. They again finished second in 1960 (going 88–66), but a full seven games behind, and were 71–58 and in fourth place late in 1961 when Dressen was replaced on September 2 by Birdie Tebbetts.

In 1962, Dressen returned to the minor leagues—yet remained in the Braves' organization—when he was named the skipper of the Toronto Maple Leafs of the Triple-A International League, who had a working agreement with Milwaukee. Under Dressen, the 1962 Leafs registered 91 victories, but fell in the playoffs to the eventual champion Atlanta Crackers.

== Detroit Tigers ==
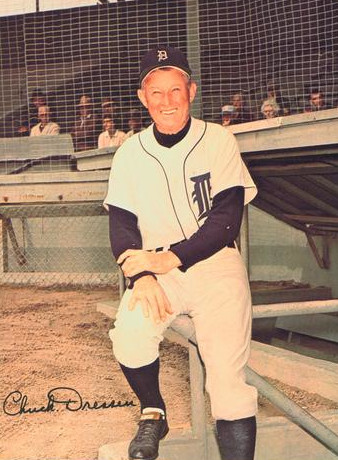
Chuck Dressen, circa 1966

As the 1963 season began, Dressen was out of uniform, scouting for the Dodgers. But after the Detroit Tigers won only 24 of their first 60 games under Bob Scheffing, Dressen was hired on June 18 to take over the team. He rallied the Tigers to a 55–47 record for the remainder of 1963, a first division finish in 1964, and was mentoring many of the key players who won the 1968 World Series for Detroit, including Denny McLain, Willie Horton, Mickey Lolich, Dick McAuliffe, Bill Freehan and others.

However, by his third year with Detroit, Dressen's health began to fail. In 1965, a heart attack sidelined him during spring training and he didn't return as the Tigers' manager until May 31. He managed the first 26 games of the 1966 campaign before his hospitalization from a second cardiac event on May 16, leaving the Tigers in the care of acting managers Bob Swift, then, after Swift was sidelined in mid-July by serious illness himself, Frank Skaff.

Still on medical leave when August began, Dressen was reported to be recovering from his heart attack when he was stricken with a kidney infection, and died of cardiac arrest in a Detroit hospital on August 10, 1966. Because Dressen's year of birth was commonly listed as 1898 during his baseball career, his "baseball age" was reported to be 67 at his death. However, recent sources such as Baseball Reference and Retrosheet have backdated his birth year to 1894, making him 71 years old at his passing. He is interred in the Forest Lawn Memorial Park Cemetery in Glendale, California.

Known for his self-confidence, Dressen often told his star-studded Dodgers, "Just hold them for a few innings, fellas. I'll think of something." His career big league managerial record was 1,008–973–9 (.509), including a 298–166 (.642) mark in Brooklyn.

== Managerial record ==
Team	Year	Regular season					Postseason			
Team	Year	Games	Won	Lost	Win %	Finish	Won	Lost	Win %	Result
CIN	1934	60	21	39	.350	Interim	–	–	–	
CIN	1935	153	68	85	.444	6th in NL	–	–	–	
CIN	1936	154	74	80	.481	5th in NL	–	–	–	
CIN	1937	129	51	78	.395	Fired	–	–	–	
CIN total		496	214	282	.431		0	0	–	
BKN	1951	157	97	60	.618	2nd in NL	–	–	–	
BKN	1952	153	96	57	.627	1st in NL	3	4	.429	Lost World Series (NYY)
BKN	1953	154	105	49	.682	1st in NL	2	4	.333	Lost World Series (NYY)
BKN total		464	298	166	.642		5	8	.385	
WSH	1955	154	53	101	.344	8th in AL	–	–	–	
WSH	1956	154	59	95	.383	7th in AL	–	–	–	
WSH	1957	20	4	16	.200	Fired	–	–	–	
WSH total		328	116	212	.354		0	0	–	
MIL	1960	154	88	66	.571	2nd in NL	–	–	–	
MIL	1961	129	71	58	.550	Fired	–	–	–	
MIL total		283	159	124	.562		0	0	–	
DET	1963	102	55	47	.539	5th in AL	–	–	–	
DET	1964	162	85	77	.525	4th in AL	–	–	–	
DET	1965	120	65	55	.542	4th in AL	–	–	–	
DET	1966	26	16	10	.615	Illness	–	–	–	
DET total		410	221	189	.539		0	0	–	
Total		1981	1008	973	.509		5	8	.385	

== See also ==
- List of Major League Baseball managers with most career wins

Sporting positions
Preceded by Casey Stengel; Augie Galan	Oakland Oaks manager 1949–1950; 1954	Succeeded by Mel Ott; Lefty O'Doul
Preceded by Tim Thompson	Toronto Maple Leafs manager 1962	Succeeded by Bill Adair
