= Harlin Pool =

American baseball player (1908–1963)

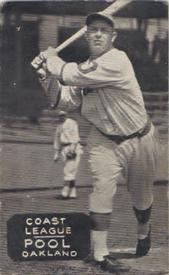
- Outfielder
- Born: March 13, 1908; Lakeport, California, U.S.
- Died: February 15, 1963 (aged 54); Rodeo, California, U.S.
- Batted: Left Threw: Right

MLB debut
- May 30, 1934, for the Cincinnati Reds

Last MLB appearance
- June 2, 1935, for the Cincinnati Reds

MLB statistics
- Batting average: .303
- Home runs: 2
- Runs batted in: 61
- Stats at Baseball Reference

Teams
- Cincinnati Reds (1934–1935)

Harlin Welty Pool (March 13, 1908 – February 15, 1963) nicknamed "Samson", was an outfielder in Major League Baseball. He played for the Cincinnati Reds.

== Minor leagues ==
Pool broke into professional baseball in 1930 with the Oakland Oaks, starting the season with the club's affiliate Phoenix of the Arizona League. of the Pacific Coast League for whom he was a catcher Mission Reds' manager George Burns stated in 1931 that Pool "is one of the most natural hitters in the Coast league. Pool replaced catcher and future Baseball Hall of Famer Ernie Lombardi when Lombardi was elevated to the Brooklyn Dodgers in 1931. Pool, in 165 games for the Oaks, batted .348 (seventh in the league) with 103 run scored, 126 runs batted in, 219 hits, 48 doubles, 10 triples and 5 home runs, along with 21 stolen bases.

Pool was part of baseball history in 1933 when the Oaks hosted the San Francisco Seals and 18-year-old Joe DiMaggio, who had a 61-game hitting streak. In an otherwise meaningless game as far as the pennant race was concerned, DiMaggio was hitless with his team trailing by two runs in the ninth inning, but the Seals tied it to go into extra innings. DiMaggio came to bat in the 11th inning and lined a pitch into right field, where Pool ran back and made a one-handed catch to end the streak at 61.

== Major Leagues ==
On May 22, 1934, the Cincinnati Reds acquired Pool, by then an outfielder, from the Oakland club of the PCL for Art Ruble, $20,000 in cash, and a player to be named. He made his MLB debut on May 30, 1934, as the Reds hosted the St. Louis Cardinals at Crosley Field. In the fourth inning with the bases loaded against Paul Dean, he pinch-hit for right fielder Wes Schulmerich, striking out. In his second and last at-bat of the game, he tripled against Dean, scoring Lombardi, then scoring himself on a Linc Blakely single.

On July 8, he hit his first home run, a grand slam, also against the Cardinals' Paul Dean, in an 8–4 win at Sportsman's Park, driving in Gordon Slade, Mark Koenig and Jim Bottomley.

In his rookie year of 1934 with the Reds, Pool led the team in batting average at .327 in 99 games (all in the outfield), followed by the .305 average of Ernie Lombardi, who by now was Pool's teammate in Cincinnati. In 387 plate appearances, Pool hit 2 home runs with 50 runs batted in, 22 doubles and 5 triples. He was also known for being slow afoot and a below-average fielder, and he committed 10 errors, fourth worst among outfielders in 1934.

In 1935, with the Reds, Pool was part of an historic game, starting in left field and batting 5th in the first night game in Major League history on May 24, 1935, as the Reds hosted the Philadelphia Phillies at Crosley Field in a 2–1 win. Pool had one hit in 3 at-bats.

For the season, Pool had 70 plate appearances, batting .176 with 12 hits.

His final MLB game was on June 2, 1935, against the Pittsburgh Pirates as a pinch-hitter for pitcher Paul Derringer, grounding out against Jim Weaver. A Cincinnati Enquirer article on June 7 referred to "the departed Harlin Pool, who led the team at the bat last year but has been unable to get going this season."

== Return to minors ==
Pool then spent most of the 1935 season with Toronto Maple Leafs of the International League. He was released on July 17.

In 1936, he played for the Seattle Indians of the PCL. By August 31 he led the PCL with a .345 batting average after 6 hits in a doubleheader. Pool ended up finishing second to San Diego catcher George Detore, by a fraction of a point, .33410 to .33406.

In 1938, he was acquired by the Dallas Steers of the Texas League, where he was selected to the all-star game as a left fielder. On August 14 he led the league with a .337 average. The "pudgy outfielder" was later moved to catcher as manager Jim Levey said "he's too slow to go as an outfielder." He ended up with the top batting average in the league.

In 1939, the Steers asked him to take a pay cut and became a holdout in the spring. He was released by the Steers on March 2. After "retiring" and playing in a semi-pro team, in late June manager Lefty O'Doul signed Pool to the San Francisco Seals of the PCL, and he debuted with 2 hits against the Oaks.

== Later life ==
In 1942, Pool spent time playing for Union in the Contra Costa refinery league and later in the Alameda League.

Pool was a military veteran of the U.S. Army during World War II. In 1944, the staff sergeant formed a baseball team at Fort Warren, Wyoming, where he was player-manager.

Pool died at his home in Rodeo, California after a long illness. He is buried at Golden Gate National Cemetery, San Bruno, California. He was survived by his wife, Mildred, a son, three siblings and two grandchildren.
