= Arnie Moser =

American baseball player (1915–2002)

- Pinch hitter
- Born: August 9, 1915; Houston, Texas, U.S.
- Died: August 15, 2002 (aged 87); Houston, Texas, U.S.
- Batted: Right Threw: Right

MLB debut
- June 20, 1937, for the Cincinnati Reds

Last MLB appearance
- July 3, 1937, for the Cincinnati Reds

MLB statistics
- Games played: 5
- At bats: 5
- Hits: 0
- Stats at Baseball Reference

Teams
- Cincinnati Reds (1937)

Arnold Robert Moser (August 9, 1915 – August 15, 2002) was an American pinch hitter in Major League Baseball. He played for the Cincinnati Reds.
