= Larry MacPhail =

American lawyer and baseball executive (1890-1975)

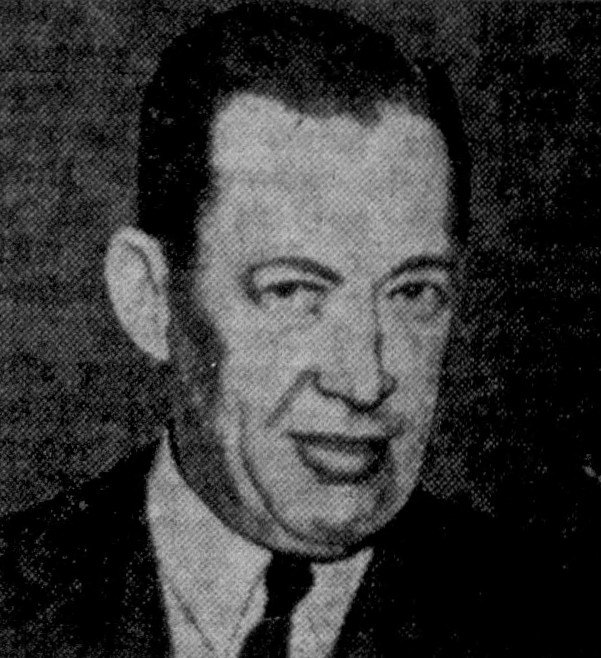
- MacPhail, circa 1942
- Born: Leland Stanford MacPhail; February 3, 1890; Cass City, Michigan, U.S.
- Died: October 1, 1975 (aged 85); Miami, Florida, U.S.
- Education: University of Michigan (BA); George Washington University (LLB)
- Occupation: Baseball executive
- Spouse: Inez Thompson (m. 1910; div. 1945) Jean Bennett Wanamaker (m. 1945)
- Children: 4, including Lee and Bill
- Relatives: Andy MacPhail (grandson)
- Baseball career

Teams
- As general manager: Cincinnati Reds (1933–1937); New York Yankees (1945–1947); As president: Brooklyn Dodgers (1938–1942); New York Yankees (1945–1947)

Career highlights and awards
- World Series champion (1947)

Member of the National

Baseball Hall of Fame
- Induction: 1978
- Election method: Veterans Committee

Leland Stanford "Larry" MacPhail Sr. (February 3, 1890 – October 1, 1975) was an American lawyer and an executive in Major League Baseball. He served as a high-ranking executive, including club president and general manager, with the Cincinnati Reds, Brooklyn Dodgers and New York Yankees, and was a one-third owner of the Yankees from 1945 through 1947. MacPhail's sons and grandsons were also sports executives. He was inducted into the National Baseball Hall of Fame in 1978.

== Early life ==
MacPhail was born in Cass City, Michigan, on February 3, 1890. His father founded State Savings Bank of Scottville, Michigan, in 1882 as well as twenty other small banks in that state. He obtained an LL.B. from the George Washington University Law School, where he became friends with Branch Rickey. He worked for a time with a Chicago law firm. Prior to World War I Larry MacPhail was an executive of a department store in Nashville, Tennessee.

During World War I, he served as an artillery captain in France and Belgium. He accompanied his commander, Colonel Luke Lea, on an unsanctioned mission to Amerongen in the Netherlands in January 1919 to attempt to arrest the exiled German monarch, Kaiser Wilhelm II, and bring him to the Paris Peace Conference to be tried for war crimes. MacPhail reportedly stole an ashtray that belonged to the Kaiser and received an official reprimand for the mission.

== Entry into baseball ==
After his discharge from military service, MacPhail opened a law office in Columbus, Ohio, where he eventually purchased an interest in the Columbus Red Birds, a minor league affiliate of the St. Louis Cardinals. While in the role of president of the Red Birds, MacPhail came up with a plan to create a geographically based playoff system for determining the league champion of the American Association. It was not well-received and lasted only two years. In 1933 he was hired by the Cincinnati Reds and became its chief executive and general manager. MacPhail had been recommended for the Reds position by Branch Rickey, who said that MacPhail was "a wild man at times, but he'll do the job." After leaving the Reds, he spent about a year with his father's investment business before becoming executive vice-president and general manager of the Brooklyn Dodgers in 1938. He was promoted to team president, a position that had been vacant for about a year after the death of the previous team president Stephen McKeever, on May 4, 1939. In 1939, he received the Sporting News Executive of the Year Award.

MacPhail was pivotal in the development of pioneering sportscaster Red Barber, who announced Reds and Dodgers games for MacPhail. MacPhail's innovations include nighttime baseball, regular game televising, and flying teams between cities. MacPhail resigned as president of the Dodgers on September 23, 1942, to accept a commission in the United States Army. By the end of World War II, MacPhail held the rank of colonel. Returning from the war, MacPhail served as president, co-owner and general manager for the New York Yankees.

MacPhail was well known for his unpredictable behavior which was fueled by bouts of heavy drinking. MacPhail's grandson Andy said, "My grandfather was bombastic, flamboyant, a genius when sober, brilliant when he had one drink and a raving lunatic when he had too many." In one incident, MacPhail was drinking with Boston Red Sox owner Tom Yawkey when the men decided to swap stars Joe DiMaggio and Ted Williams in what would have been the biggest swap of baseball stars in many years. The men decided not to execute the trade after they sobered up.

Leo Durocher, the Dodgers manager who had a tempestuous relationship with MacPhail, recalled, "There is a thin line between genius and insanity, and in Larry's case, it was so thin you could see him drifting back and forth." As the Dodgers returned by train to Grand Central Terminal after winning the 1941 league pennant, Durocher did not want his players to get off early at the 125th Street stop, so he ordered the conductor to pass the stop. MacPhail was planning to board the same train at that stop. He told Durocher that night that he was fired, but he changed his mind the next morning.

MacPhail's career as a major-league owner ended after the Yankees clinched the 1947 World Series, when he got into confrontations at the team's post-game celebrations at Yankee Stadium and then in Manhattan. Though he had already quit as chief executive in the Yankee locker room, books by Roger Kahn and others indicate MacPhail's behavior at the victory parties led to co-owners Dan Topping and Del Webb buying out his share of the ballclub.

=== Record as general manager ===
| Team | Year | Regular season | | | | | Postseason | | | |
| Team | Year | Games | Won | Lost | Win % | Finish | Won | Lost | Win % | Result |
|---|---|---|---|---|---|---|---|---|---|---|
| CIN | 1933 | 153 | 58 | 94 | .382 | 8th in NL | – | – | – | – |
| CIN | 1934 | 152 | 52 | 99 | .344 | 8th in NL | – | – | – | – |
| CIN | 1935 | 154 | 68 | 85 | .444 | 6th in NL | – | – | – | – |
| CIN | 1936 | 154 | 74 | 80 | .481 | 5th in NL | – | – | – | – |
| CIN | 1937 | 155 | 56 | 98 | .364 | 8th in NL | – | – | – | – |
| CIN total | | 768 | 308 | 456 | .403 | | 0 | 0 | – | |
| NYY | 1945 | 152 | 81 | 71 | .533 | 4th in AL | – | – | – | – |
| NYY | 1946 | 154 | 87 | 67 | .565 | 3rd in AL | – | – | – | – |
| NYY | 1947 | 155 | 97 | 57 | .630 | 1st in AL | 4 | 3 | .571 | Won World Series (BKN) |
| NYY total | | 461 | 265 | 195 | .576 | | 4 | 3 | .571 | |
| Total | | 1,229 | 573 | 651 | .468 | | 4 | 3 | .571 | |

== Later life and legacy ==
MacPhail owned a 400-acre (1.6 km^{2}) farm near Bel Air, Maryland, called Glenangus. An owner/breeder of Thoroughbred racehorses, his colt General Staff won the 1952 Narragansett Special at Narragansett Park and five other stake races that year. In March 1952, MacPhail was appointed President of Bowie Race Track in Bowie, Maryland. He held the position for thirteen months, until he was removed from the position and barred entirely from the track; he was accused of "using profanity to three horse owners" and "charged with being drunk and disorderly."

MacPhail died in a Miami nursing home on October 1, 1975, two days after Hall of Fame manager Casey Stengel. MacPhail was elected to the Baseball Hall of Fame in 1978.

Several of MacPhail's family members have become sports executives. His son and namesake Lee MacPhail enjoyed a long career in baseball, most notably as president and general manager of the Baltimore Orioles, general manager of the Yankees, and president of the American League. He was elected to the Baseball Hall of Fame in 1998, making him and Larry MacPhail the only father and son inductees. His other son Bill MacPhail was president of CBS Sports and later was President of CNN Sports, brought on by Reese Schonfeld to create the department upon the network's launch. Larry's grandson Andy MacPhail, the former general manager of the Minnesota Twins and Chicago Cubs and the former president of baseball operations for the Orioles, was president of the Philadelphia Phillies from 2015 through 2020. A great-grandson, Lee MacPhail IV, is a professional scout for the New York Mets. Another, Drew MacPhail, is a member of the Los Angeles Dodgers' front office.

Since 1966, Minor League Baseball has annually awarded the Larry MacPhail Award to recognize the top promotional effort by a minor league team.

In 2013, the Bob Feller Act of Valor Award honored MacPhail as one of 37 Baseball Hall of Fame members for his service in the United States Army during World War II.

== See also ==
- The Victory Season: The End of World War II and the Birth of Baseball's Golden Age, 2013 book

Sporting positions
| Preceded by n/a | Cincinnati Reds general manager 1933–1937 | Succeeded by Warren Giles |
| Preceded by Stephen McKeever | Brooklyn Dodgers president 1938–1942 | Succeeded by Branch Rickey |
| Preceded by Ed Barrow | New York Yankees general manager 1945–1947 | Succeeded by George Weiss |
| Preceded by Ed Barrow | New York Yankees president 1945–1947 | Succeeded by Dan Topping |
| Preceded by Jacob Ruppert Estate | Owner of the New York Yankees with Dan Topping and Del Webb 1945–1947 | Succeeded by Dan Topping and Del Webb |
