= Pinky Jorgensen =

American baseball player (1914–1996)

- Outfielder
- Born: November 21, 1914; Laton, California, U.S.
- Died: May 2, 1996 (aged 81); Santa Cruz, California, U.S.
- Batted: Right Threw: Right

MLB debut
- September 14, 1937, for the Cincinnati Reds

Last MLB appearance
- September 30, 1937, for the Cincinnati Reds

MLB statistics
- Games played: 6
- At bats: 14
- Hits: 4
- Stats at Baseball Reference

Teams
- Cincinnati Reds (1937)

Carl "Pinky" Jorgensen (November 21, 1914 – May 2, 1996) was an American outfielder in Major League Baseball. He played for the Cincinnati Reds.
