= Gus Brittain =

American baseball player (1909–1974)

- Pinch hitter / Catcher
- Born: November 29, 1909; Wilmington, North Carolina, U.S.
- Died: February 16, 1974 (aged 64); Wilmington, North Carolina, U.S.
- Batted: Right Threw: Right

MLB debut
- July 22, 1937, for the Cincinnati Reds

Last MLB appearance
- September 15, 1937, for the Cincinnati Reds

MLB statistics
- Games played: 3
- At bats: 6
- Hits: 1
- Stats at Baseball Reference

Teams
- Cincinnati Reds (1937)

August Schuster Brittain (November 29, 1909 – February 16, 1974) was an American Major League Baseball player who played with the Cincinnati Reds in 1937. He played in two games as a pinch hitter and one game as a catcher.
