= Lee Gamble =

American baseball player (1910–1994)

- Outfielder
- Born: June 28, 1910; Renovo, Pennsylvania, U.S.
- Died: October 5, 1994 (aged 84); Punxsutawney, Pennsylvania, U.S.
- Batted: Left Threw: Right

MLB debut
- September 15, 1935, for the Cincinnati Reds

Last MLB appearance
- August 21, 1940, for the Cincinnati Reds

MLB statistics
- Batting average: .266
- Home runs: 0
- Runs batted in: 21
- Stats at Baseball Reference

Teams
- Cincinnati Reds (1935, 1938–1940)

Lee Jesse Gamble (June 28, 1910 – October 5, 1994) was an American professional baseball. He was an outfielder over parts of four seasons (1935, 1938–40) with the Cincinnati Reds. For his career, he compiled a .266 batting average in 342 at-bats, with 21 runs batted in. He made only one error in 135 total chances in 77 games at the outfield for a .993 fielding percentage.

He was born in Renovo, Pennsylvania and later died in Punxsutawney, Pennsylvania, at the age of 84.
