= Dutch Mele =

American baseball player (1915–1975)

- Outfielder
- Born: January 11, 1915; New York City
- Died: February 12, 1975 (aged 60); Hollywood, Florida
- Batted: Left Threw: Left

MLB debut
- September 14, 1937, for the Cincinnati Reds

Last MLB appearance
- October 3, 1937, for the Cincinnati Reds

MLB statistics
- Batting average: .143
- Home runs: 0
- Runs batted in: 1
- Stats at Baseball Reference

Teams
- Cincinnati Reds (1937)

Albert Ernest "Dutch" Mele (January 11, 1915 – February 12, 1975) was a professional baseball player.

== Career ==
He was an outfielder for one season (1937) with the Cincinnati Reds. For his career, he compiled a .143 batting average in 14 at-bats, with one runs batted in.

Mele played 17 seasons in minor league baseball (nine with the Syracuse Chiefs), hitting 244 home runs.

== Personal life and death ==
He was born in New York City and later died in Hollywood, Florida at the age of 60.
