= Whitey Hilcher =

American baseball player (1909–1962)

- Pitcher
- Born: February 28, 1909; Chicago, Illinois, U.S.
- Died: November 21, 1962 (aged 53); Minneapolis, Minnesota, U.S.
- Batted: Right Threw: Right

MLB debut
- September 17, 1931, for the Cincinnati Reds

Last MLB appearance
- July 5, 1936, for the Cincinnati Reds

MLB statistics
- Win–loss record: 3–6
- Earned run average: 5.29
- Strikeouts: 28
- Stats at Baseball Reference

Teams
- Cincinnati Reds (1931–1932, 1935–1936)

Walter Frank "Whitey" Hilcher (February 28, 1909 – November 21, 1962) was an American Major League Baseball pitcher. Hilcher played for the Cincinnati Reds in 1931, 1932, 1935, and 1936.

During World War II, Hilcher served with the US Army Signal Corps. He died of a heart attack in November 1962 and was buried in the Fort Snelling National Cemetery.
