= Dee Moore =

American baseball player (1914–1997)

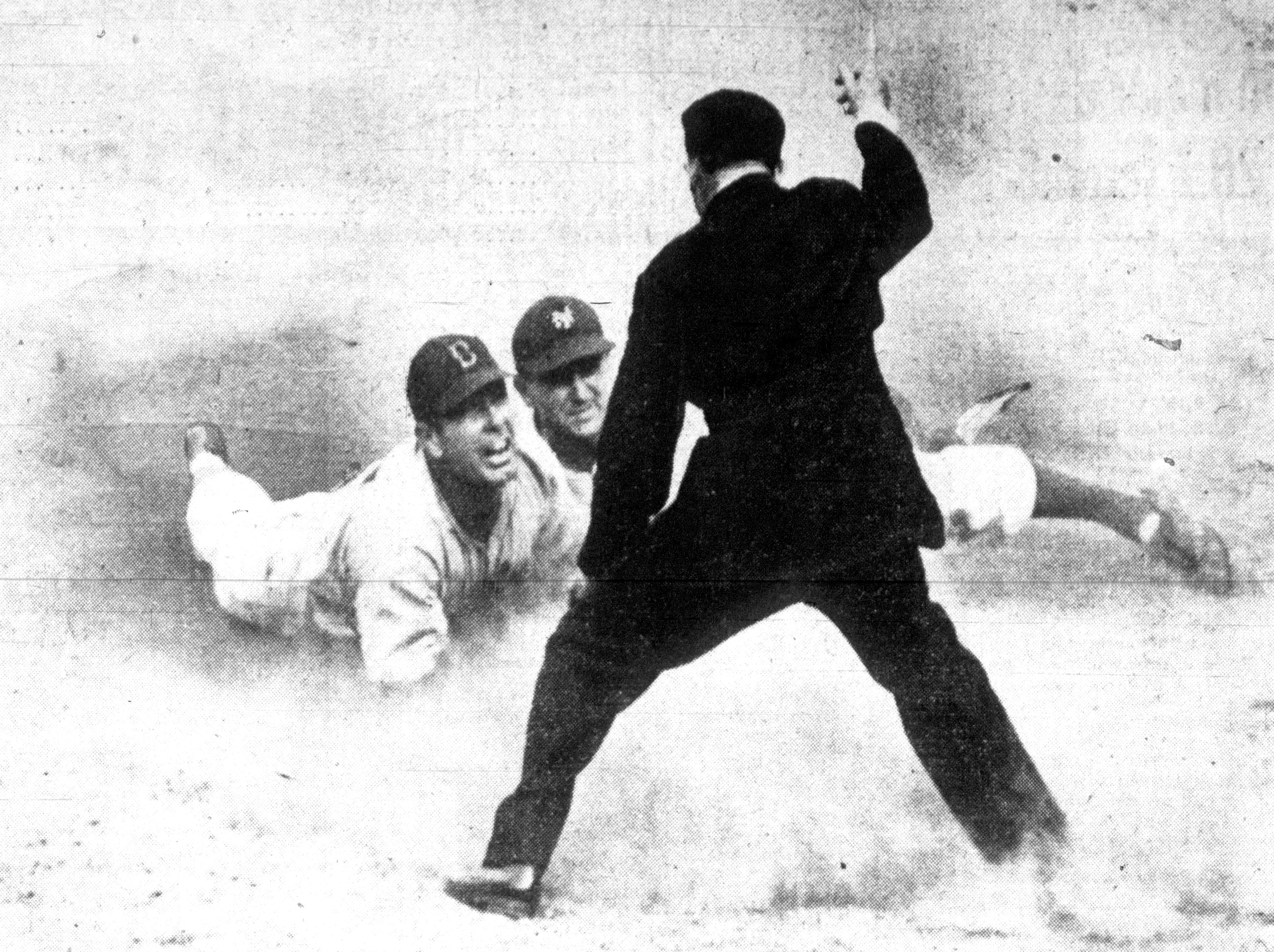
- Moore (left) is picked off by New York Giants second baseman Nick Witek (center) on 20 June 1943.
- Catcher / Outfielder
- Born: April 6, 1914; Hedley, Texas, U.S.
- Died: July 2, 1997 (aged 83); Williston, North Dakota, U.S.
- Batted: Right Threw: Right

MLB debut
- September 12, 1936, for the Cincinnati Reds

Last MLB appearance
- September 29, 1946, for the Philadelphia Phillies

MLB statistics
- Batting average: .232
- Home runs: 1
- Runs batted in: 22
- Stats at Baseball Reference

Teams
- Cincinnati Reds (1936–1937); Brooklyn Dodgers (1943); Philadelphia Phillies (1943, 1946)

D. C. Moore (April 6, 1914 – July 2, 1997) was an American catcher and outfielder in Major League Baseball who played from 1936 to 1946. In between his playing years, from 1944 to 1945, he served in the United States Marine Corps during World War II. Born in Hedley, Texas, he died at age 83 in Williston, North Dakota.
