= Hank Erickson =

American baseball player (1907–1964)

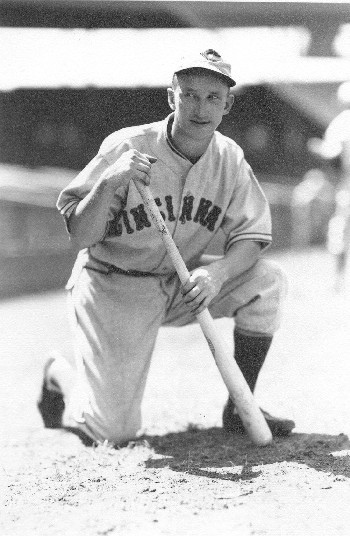
- Catcher
- Born: November 11, 1907; Chicago, Illinois, U.S.
- Died: December 13, 1964 (aged 57); Louisville, Kentucky, U.S.
- Batted: Right Threw: Right

MLB debut
- April 17, 1935, for the Cincinnati Reds

Last MLB appearance
- September 2, 1935, for the Cincinnati Reds

MLB statistics
- Batting average: .261
- Home runs: 1
- Runs batted in: 4
- Stats at Baseball Reference

Teams
- Cincinnati Reds (1935)

Henry Nels Erickson (November 11, 1907 – December 13, 1964) was an American professional baseball catcher. Erickson spent seven seasons in professional baseball, one of which was in Major League Baseball with the Cincinnati Reds. Over his major league career, Erickson batted .261 with nine runs, 23 hits, three doubles, two triples, one home run, and four runs batted in (RBIs) in 37 games. His only season in the majors was cut short because of injuries he suffered in an automobile accident.

In six minor league seasons (1931–1934, 1936–1937), Erickson batted .265 with 333 hits, 49 doubles, 20 triples, and five home runs in 402 games. He played for three teams in the minors; the Double-A Louisville Colonels of the American Association, the Double-A Toronto Maple Leafs of the International League, and the Class-A Waterloo Reds of the Western League. During his career, Erickson had the nickname "Popeye".

== Professional career ==
=== Early career ===
Erickson began his professional career in 1931 with the Double-A Louisville Colonels. In eight games that season, Erickson batted .179 with five hits, and one triple. Erickson spent the next three seasons with the Colonels. In 1932, Erickson batted .301 with 71 hits, nine doubles, six triples, and one home run. The next season, 1933, Erickson batted .298 with 105 hits, 18 doubles, four triples, and two home runs in 105 games. Erickson spent his final season with the Colonels in 1934. During that season, he batted .264 with 57 hits, 10 doubles, five triples, two home runs. Erickson was sent to the Philadelphia Athletics that season, but was sent back before making an appearance.

=== Cincinnati Reds ===
In 1935, Erickson was purchased by the Cincinnati Reds as a part of a rebuilding phase in the franchise. On April 18, after replacing injured catcher Ernie Lombardi in a game against the Pittsburgh Pirates, Erickson hit his first major league home run. During his time with the Reds, Erickson was given the nickname "Popeye" after the comic strip character. Erickson was involved in an automobile accident in September. He suffered a dislocated right hip, a broken left elbow, a skull fracture, a brain injury, and skull lacerations. Early into his hospital stay, Erickson slipped in and out of consciousness. He was unable to play for the remainder of the season. Injured catcher Ernie Lombardi had to take over the bulk of the catching duties while Erickson was out. Erickson played 37 games with the Reds and batted .261 with nine runs, 23 hits, three doubles, two triples, one home run, and four runs batted in (RBIs).

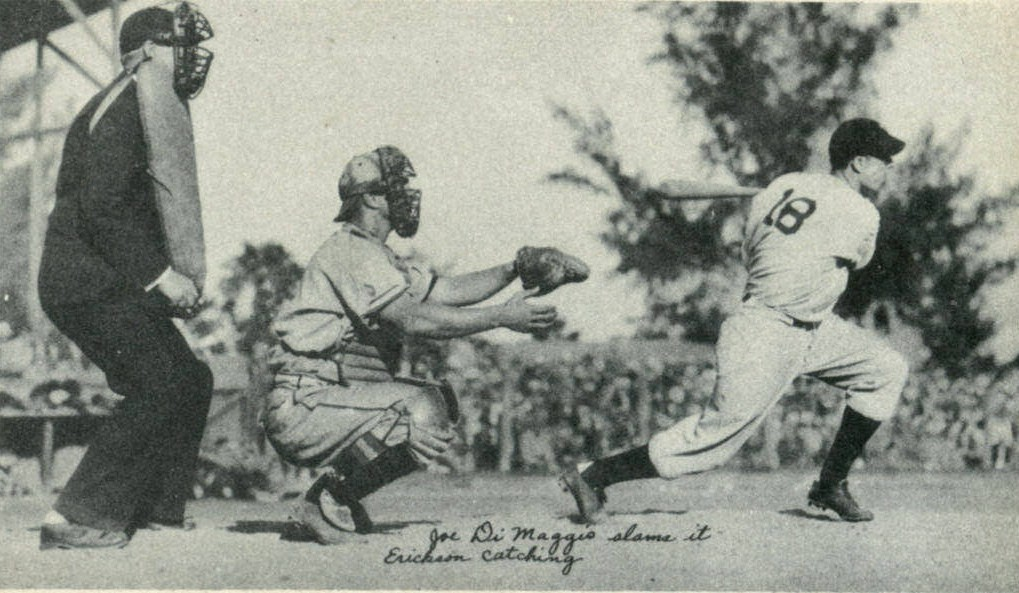
Erickson behind the plate while Joe DiMaggio hits the ball.

=== Later career ===
Erickson spent the 1936 season with the Double-A Toronto Maple Leafs in the Cincinnati Reds organization. Erickson was sent down by the Reds to receive the bulk of the catching duties in the minors. He batted .216 with 44 hits, five doubles, and two triples in 73 games that season. On November 25, 1936, the Reds sold Erickson to the Rochester Red Wings. However, Erickson played the entire 1937 season with the Class-A Waterloo Reds. With Waterloo, Erickson batted .232 with 51 hits, seven doubles, and two triples in 66 games. 1937 would prove to be Erickson's final season in professional baseball.

== Personal ==
Erickson was born on November 11, 1907, in Chicago, Illinois. According to TheDeadBallEra.com, after his professional baseball career was over, Erickson worked as a stockroom manager in Louisville, Kentucky. He died on December 13, 1964, in Louisville. Erickson was buried at Glen Oak Cemetery in Hillside, Illinois.
