= Benny Frey =

American baseball player (1906–1937)

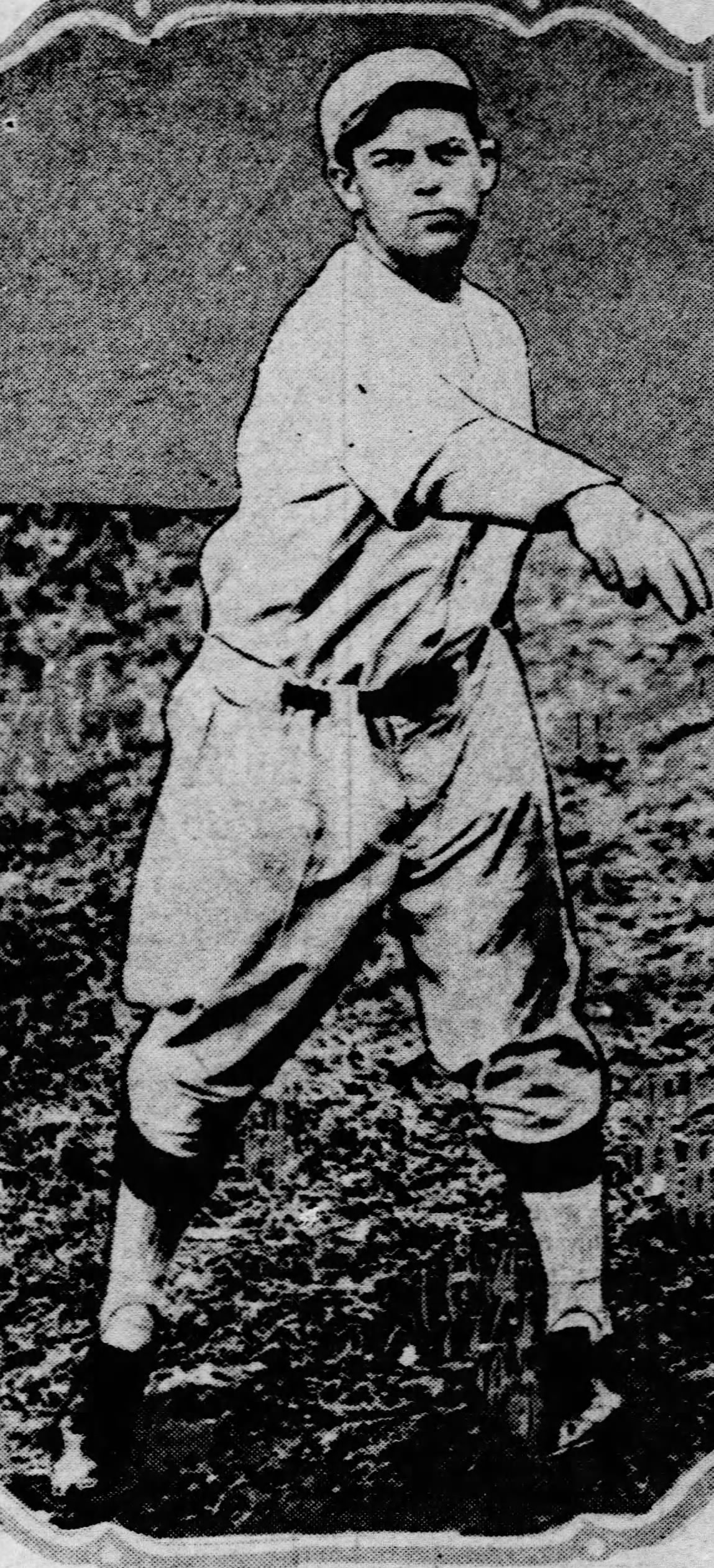
- Pitcher
- Born: April 6, 1906; Dexter, Michigan, U.S.
- Died: November 1, 1937 (aged 31); Spring Arbor Township, Michigan, U.S.
- Batted: Right Threw: Right

MLB debut
- September 18, 1929, for the Cincinnati Reds

Last MLB appearance
- September 22, 1936, for the Cincinnati Reds

MLB statistics
- Win–loss record: 57–82
- Earned run average: 4.50
- Strikeouts: 179
- Stats at Baseball Reference

Teams
- Cincinnati Reds (1929–1932); St. Louis Cardinals (1932); Cincinnati Reds (1932–1936)

Benjamin Rudolph Frey (April 6, 1906 – November 1, 1937) was an American right-handed pitcher in Major League Baseball from 1929 to 1936, playing primarily with the Cincinnati Reds. He was a sidearm pitcher with a sweeping motion that was effective against right-handed hitters. Frey suffered an arm injury which ultimately led to his retirement and subsequent suicide.

== Professional career ==
After spending time with the Toledo Mud Hens, Frey entered the major leagues in 1929 with the Cincinnati Reds. In 1930, Frey lost 18 games, most in the National League. During the 1932 season, he was traded to the Cardinals, along with Harvey Hendrick for Chick Hafey. The Cardinal's general manager, Branch Rickey, would send Frey back to the Reds for cash.

His best season was 1934 when he was 11–16 for the Reds with a 3.52 ERA (adjusted ERA+ of 116), finishing sixteenth in the 1934 National League Most Valuable Player voting. Frey suffered an arm injury and was sent down to a minor league team in Nashville for the 1937 season. Frey refused to report to Nashville and asked to be put on the voluntarily retired list.

== Career statistics ==
Frey appeared in 256 major league baseball games (127 as a starter) and had a lifetime record of 57–82 in 1160 innings pitched. His lifetime earned run average of 4.50 was good for an adjusted ERA+ of 90.

== Personal life and death ==
Frey was born in Dexter, Michigan. Frey committed suicide on November 1, 1937, in Spring Arbor Township, Michigan, at the home of his sister. He had run a hose from his car's exhaust into the back seat and died of carbon monoxide poisoning. Frey had been in despair over his injured arm, which he did not think would ever recover sufficiently for a return to the major leagues.
