= Hub Walker =

American baseball player (1906–1982)

- Center fielder
- Born: August 17, 1906; Gulfport, Mississippi, U.S.
- Died: November 26, 1982 (aged 76); San Jose, California, U.S.
- Batted: Left Threw: Right

MLB debut
- April 15, 1931, for the Detroit Tigers

Last MLB appearance
- September 30, 1945, for the Detroit Tigers

MLB statistics
- Batting average: .263
- Home runs: 5
- Runs batted in: 58
- Stats at Baseball Reference

Teams
- Detroit Tigers (1931, 1935); Cincinnati Reds (1936–1937); Detroit Tigers (1945)

Career highlights and awards
- 2x World Series champion (1935, 1945)

Harvey Willos "Hub" Walker (August 17, 1906 – November 26, 1982) was an American baseball outfielder. He played professional baseball from 1929 to 1945, including five seasons in Major League Baseball with the Detroit Tigers (1931, 1935, 1945) and Cincinnati Reds (1936–1937). He played in 297 major league games, 211 in the outfield, and compiled . 263 batting average with a .354 on-base percentage. He was a member of the Tigers teams that won the 1935 and 1945 World Series.

== Early years ==
Walker was born in 1906 in Gulfport, Mississippi. He attended Hattiesburg High School and the University of Mississippi. His younger brother Gee Walker also played baseball. They were teammates both at Ole Miss and with the Detroit Tigers.

== Professional baseball ==
Walker began his professional baseball career in 1929 with the Fort Smith Twins of the Western Association, compiling a .345 batting average in 105 games. In 1930, he advanced to the Evansville Hubs of the Three-I League where he hit .355 in 135 games.

After two strong season in the minors, Walker joined the Detroit Tigers in 1931, making his major league debut on April 15, 1931. He appeared in 90 games, 61 as a center fielder, and compiled a .286 batting average and a .355 on-base percentage.

Walker returned to the minor leagues in 1932 where he played for the Toronto Maple Leafs of the International League (1932), Montreal Royals of the International League (1932-1934), Jersey City Skeeters of the International League (1933), and Toledo Mud Hens of the American Association.

He returned to the Tigers in June 1935 but appeared in only nine games. In 29 plate appearances, he had four runs, three walks, three doubles, four runs scored, and one RBI. On June 25, 1935, he was released by the Tigers.

In November 1935, Walker signed as a free agent with the Cincinnati Reds. He appeared in 92 games for the Reds in 1936, 48 as a center fielder and 24 as a left fielder. He compiled a .275 batting average and a .366 on-base percentage with 49 runs scored and 23 RBIs.

He returned to the Reds in 1937 and appeared in 78 games, 37 in center field and 21 in left field. He compiled a .249 batting average and .349 on-base percentage.

Walker again returned to the minors in 1938, appearing in 138 games for the Nashville Volunteers of the Southern Association with a .319 batting average and .475 slugging percentage.

From 1939 to 1942, Walker played for the Minneapolis Millers of the American Association. He appeared in 511 games for the Millers. In 1939, he hit .304 with 24 home runs, and in 1940, he hit .318 with 25 home runs.

Walker missed the 1943 and 1944 seasons, and most of the 1945 season, due to service in the United States Navy during World War II. He saw combat in the South Pacific and sustained a knee injury. Interviewed in a San Diego hospital, he said: "I guess I have played my last game of baseball."

After his discharge from the Navy, Walker designed an aluminum brace for his knee and made a comeback with the Detroit Tigers. He appeared in 28 games for the 1945 Tigers and had three hits, nine walks, and scored five runs in 32 plate appearances. With his limited plate appearances, Walker was ineligible for the World Series, but Commissioner Happy Chandler waived the rules to allow the returning World War II veteran to play in the postseason. Walker played in two games of the 1945 World Series for the Tigers, getting a double and scoring a run in two World Series at bats as a pinch hitter.

== Later years ==
Walker died in 1982 at age 76 at a convalescent hospital in San Jose, California.

Walker donated his papers to the University of Mississippi Library. The papers available there include correspondence, photographs, scrapbooks, and a notebook of World War II reminiscences.
