= Calvin Chapman =

American baseball player (1910–1983)

- Infielder / Outfielder
- Born: December 20, 1910; Courtland, Mississippi, U.S.
- Died: April 1, 1983 (aged 72); Batesville, Mississippi, U.S.
- Batted: Left Threw: Right

MLB debut
- September 10, 1935, for the Cincinnati Reds

Last MLB appearance
- September 27, 1936, for the Cincinnati Reds

MLB statistics
- Batting average: .265
- Home runs: 1
- Runs batted in: 25
- Stats at Baseball Reference

Teams
- Cincinnati Reds (1935–1936)

Calvin Louis Chapman (December 20, 1910 – April 1, 1983) was an American infielder and outfielder in Major League Baseball. He played for the Cincinnati Reds.
