= Les Scarsella =

American baseball player (1913–1958)

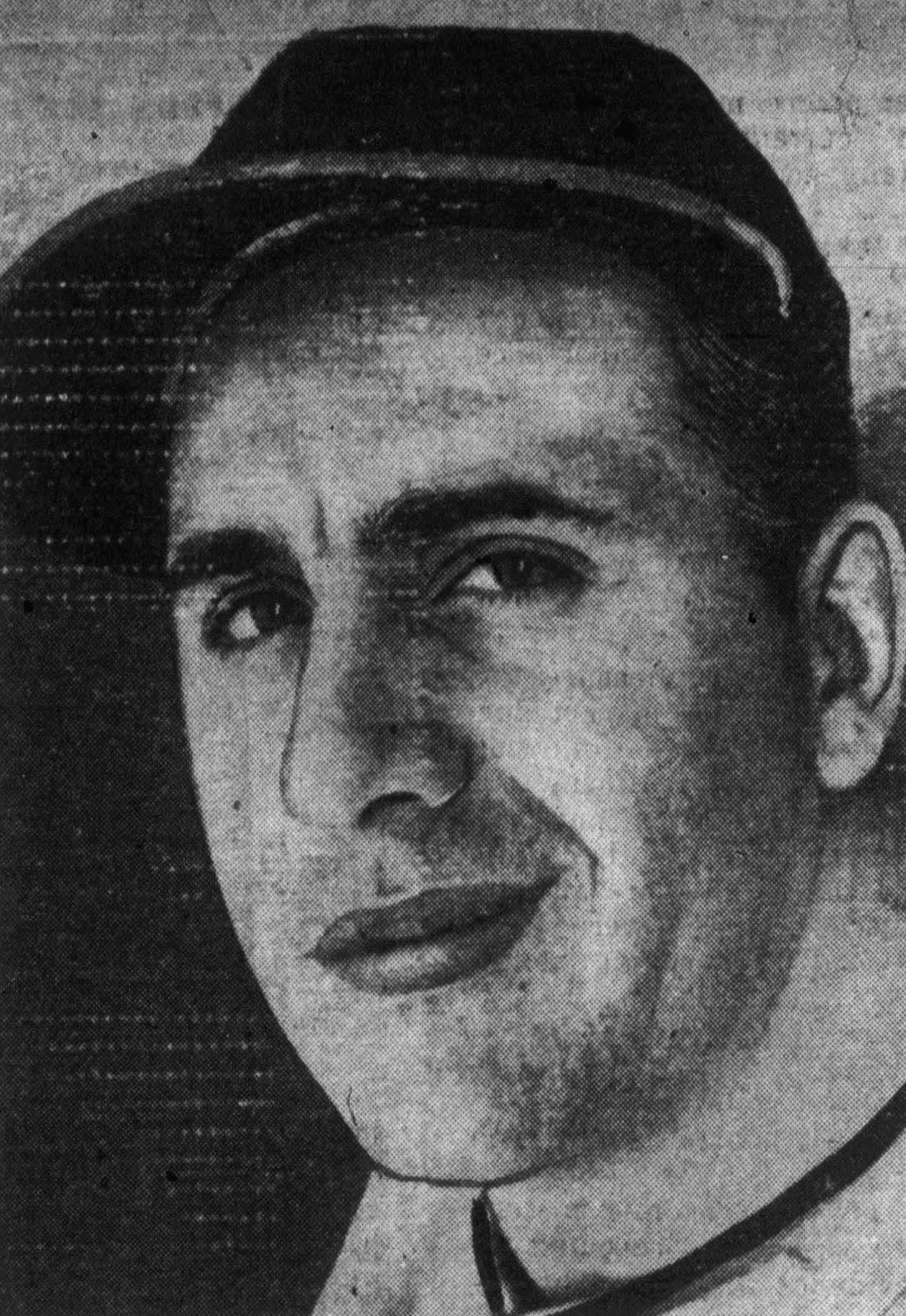
- Scarsella, circa 1946
- First baseman / Left fielder
- Born: November 23, 1913; Santa Cruz, California, U.S.
- Died: December 16, 1958 (aged 45); San Francisco, California, U.S.
- Batted: Left Threw: Left

MLB debut
- September 15, 1935, for the Cincinnati Reds

Last MLB appearance
- May 19, 1940, for the Boston Bees

MLB statistics
- Batting average: .284
- Home runs: 6
- Runs batted in: 109
- Stats at Baseball Reference

Teams
- Cincinnati Reds (1935–1937, 1939); Boston Bees (1940)

Leslie George Scarsella (November 23, 1913 – December 16, 1958) was an American professional baseball player of the 1930s and 1940s. A first baseman and left fielder, he was the two-time Pacific Coast League MVP and appeared in 265 games in Major League Baseball over all or part of five seasons with the Cincinnati Reds (1935–37; 1939) and Boston Bees (1940).

Scarsella was born in Santa Cruz, California, and attended Richmond High School and Saint Mary's College. He threw and batted left-handed, and was listed as 5 feet 11 inches (1.80 m) tall and 185 pounds (84 kg). He began his pro baseball career in 1934 in the Cincinnati farm system, and the following year saw his debut in the majors. During a September recall, after he had led the Class B Piedmont League in runs scored, Scarsella appeared in six games for the Reds and collected his first two big-league hits in ten at bats.

After a torrid start to the 1936 season with the top-level Toronto Maple Leafs of the International League, Scarsella was recalled to Cincinnati for his most productive MLB campaign. Appearing in 115 games as the Reds' regular first baseman between May 29 and the end of the season, Scarsella reached career highs in games played and all offensive categories, batting .313 with 152 hits, 21 doubles, nine triples, three home runs and 65 runs batted in. But in 1937, Scarsella lost his regular job in mid-May to Buck Jordan, and his production declined considerably; he batted only .246 in 110 games. He spent all of 1938 on loan to the Newark Bears, one of the New York Yankees' top affiliates, where he recovered to bat .307 in 128 games. But a return to Cincinnati in 1939 saw him hit only .143 in 14 pinch hitting appearances through July 27.

During the offseason, Scarsella was traded to the Boston Bees for pitcher Jim "Milkman" Turner, a former 20-game winner. He had three three-hit games during the season's first month and was still batting .300 for Boston on May 20, when his contract was sold to another International League club, the Buffalo Bisons. The transaction marked the end of Scarsella's major league career, during which he collected 255 hits, with 34 doubles, 16 triples and six homers. He knocked in 109 runs.

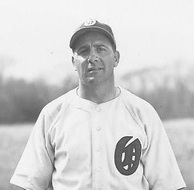
Scarsella, circa 1947

Scarsella returned to the West Coast in 1941 and launched a successful nine-year tenure in the top-level Pacific Coast League, hitting over .300 six times and winning MVP honors in 1944 (when he was the league's batting champion) and 1946. According to his obituary, Scarsella spurned the opportunity to return to the majors during the World War II manpower shortage, saying he preferred to remain in his native California rather than return to the East or Midwest to play in the majors. Charlie Metro was Scarsella's teammate with the Oakland Oaks in 1946. He said this of Scarsella: "Les Scarsella was my roommate at Oakland. Les was a great hitter. He had great years in the Pacific Coast League. He could have played more in the big leagues, but he could make more in the Coast League. At the time, he was making $1,500 a month and playing six months, making $9,000 a year in the Coast League, plus a chance at more money in the playoffs. He told me Cincinnati had offered him a contract for $5,000, but he wouldn't take it. He didn't want to take a cut to go to the big leagues."

He was a member of the 1948 Oakland Oaks, who won the Pacific Coast League championship. The team was known as the "Nine Old Men", as Ernie Lombardi was 40, Billy Raimondi, Cookie Lavagetto, Floyd Speer, and Nick Etten were 35, Scarsella and Jack Salveson were 34, Dario Lodigiani was 32, and Mel Duezabou was 30.

Scarsella died from a heart ailment in San Francisco nine years after his career ended. He was 45 years of age.

In 2017, Scarsella was elected to the Pacific Coast League Hall of Fame, along with baseball historian, Dick Beverage.
