= Lew Riggs =

American baseball player (1910–1975)

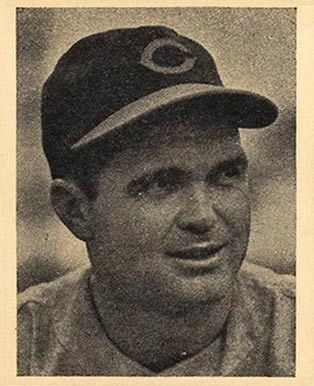
- Third baseman
- Born: April 22, 1910; Mebane, North Carolina, U.S.
- Died: August 12, 1975 (aged 65); Durham, North Carolina, U.S.
- Batted: Left Threw: Right

MLB debut
- April 28, 1934, for the St. Louis Cardinals

Last MLB appearance
- April 16, 1946, for the Brooklyn Dodgers

MLB statistics
- Batting average: .262
- Home runs: 28
- Runs batted in: 271
- Stats at Baseball Reference

Teams
- St. Louis Cardinals (1934); Cincinnati Reds (1935–1940); Brooklyn Dodgers (1941–1942, 1946)

Career highlights and awards
- All-Star (1936); World Series champion (1940)

Lewis Sidney Riggs (April 22, 1910 – August 12, 1975) was an American third baseman for the St. Louis Cardinals (1934), Cincinnati Reds (1935–40), and Brooklyn Dodgers (1941–42 and 1946).

He helped the Cardinals win the 1934 World Series, the Reds win the 1939 National League pennant and 1940 World Series and the Dodgers win the 1941 NL pennant. He was named to the 1936 National League All-Star team.

His eighth-inning pinch single off Red Ruffing scored teammate Cookie Lavagetto in the opening game of the 1941 World Series, before Ruffing and the New York Yankees held on for a 3-2 victory.

Riggs never quite achieved the same level in his baseball career after leaving the Dodgers in 1942 in order to serve his country in the Army Air Force during World War II.

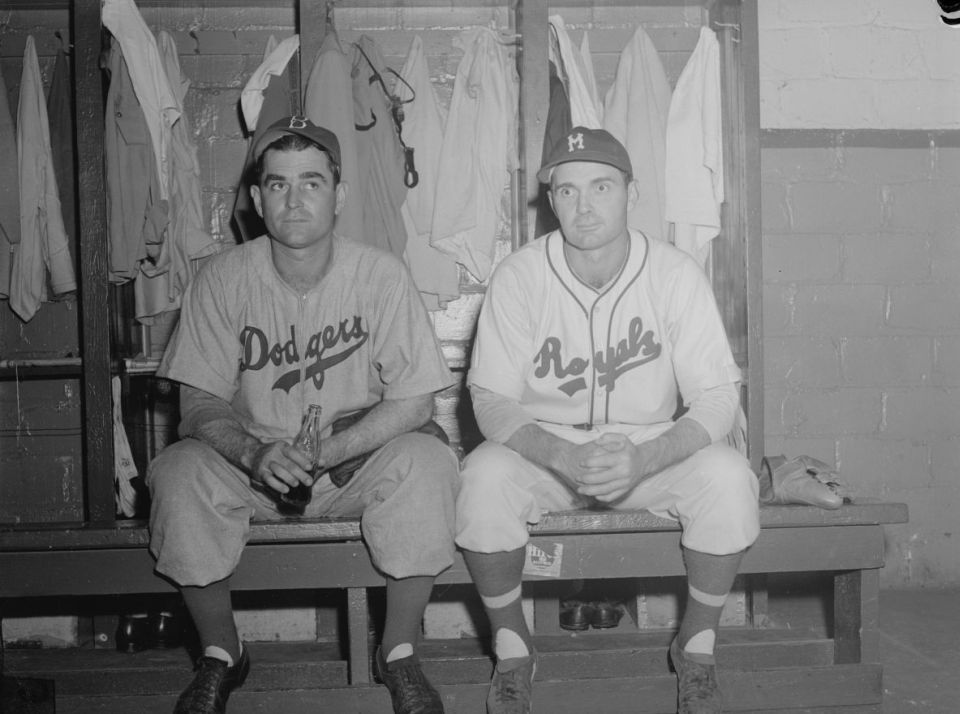
Ed Head (left) with Lew Riggs (right) in Montreal, 1946.

In 10 seasons he played in 760 Games and had 2,477 At Bats, 298 Runs, 650 Hits, 110 Doubles, 43 Triples, 28 Home Runs, 271 RBI, 22 Stolen Bases, 181 Walks, .262 Batting Average, .317 On-base percentage, .375 Slugging Percentage, 930 Total Bases and 37 Sacrifice Hits.

He died of cancer in Durham, North Carolina at the age of 65.

== Sources ==
- Career statistics from Baseball Reference · Baseball Reference (Minors) · Retrosheet
