= Billy Myers =

American baseball player (1910–1995)

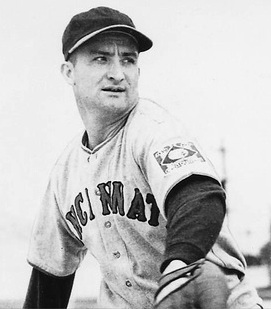
- Myers, circa 1939
- Shortstop
- Born: August 14, 1910; Enola, Pennsylvania, U.S.
- Died: April 10, 1995 (aged 84); Carlisle, Pennsylvania, U.S.
- Batted: Right Threw: Right

MLB debut
- April 16, 1935, for the Cincinnati Reds

Last MLB appearance
- September 25, 1941, for the Chicago Cubs

MLB statistics
- Batting average: .257
- Home runs: 45
- Runs batted in: 243
- Stats at Baseball Reference

Teams
- Cincinnati Reds (1935–1940); Chicago Cubs (1941)

Career highlights and awards
- Cincinnati Reds Hall of Fame

William Harrison Myers (August 14, 1910 – April 10, 1995) was an American shortstop in Major League Baseball who played from 1935 through 1941 for the Cincinnati Reds (1935–1940) and Chicago Cubs (1941). Listed at 5' 8", 168 lb., Myers batted and threw right-handed. He was born in Enola, Pennsylvania. His younger brother, Lynn, was also a major leaguer.

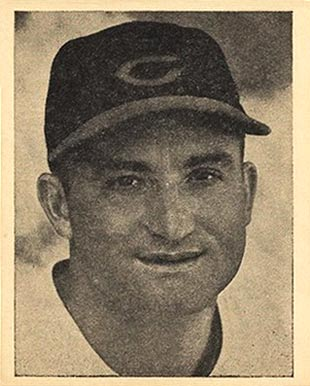
Myers in 1940

== Major league player ==
Myers hit .313 for Triple-A Columbus in 1934 before joining Cincinnati in 1935, to become the Reds' starting shortstop for the next six seasons and served as their team captain. A valuable defensive player, he was recognized as a master of reading baserunners' intents and picking up hit-and-run and stolen base signs from opposing teams.

In his rookie season, Myers hit .267 with 30 extra base hits and a .315 on-base percentage in 117 games. In 1937 was considered in the National League MVP vote, after hitting .251 and slugging .370 with a .328 OBP in 124 games. His most productive season came in 1939, when he posted career-numbers in games (130), runs (79), home runs (12) and RBI (56), while hitting .281, also a career-high. He was included in the MVP vote for the second time and also appeared in the World Series against the Yankees. But Myers is best remembered for his game-winning sacrifice fly in Game 7 of the 1940 World Series against Detroit. During the 1939 and 1940 pennant-winning seasons, he was also a part of the Reds' "Jungle Club" infield and was nicknamed "Jaguar" by teammate Billy Werber.

In a seven-season career, Myers was a .257 hitter with 45 home runs and 243 RBI in 738 games, including 319 runs, 88 doubles, 33 triples, 23 stolen bases and a .328 OBP. He collected a .946 fielding percentage in 712 games at shortstop and hit .200 (7-for-35) in 11 World Series games.

== Post-career ==
Following his playing retirement, Myers scouted for various teams for several years. In 1966, he gained induction into the Cincinnati Reds Hall of Fame.

Myers died at the age of 84 in Carlisle, Pennsylvania.
