= Don Brennan (baseball) =

American baseball player (1903–1953)

- Pitcher
- Born: December 2, 1903; Augusta, Maine, U.S.
- Died: April 26, 1953 (aged 49); Boston, Massachusetts, U.S.
- Batted: Right Threw: Right

MLB debut
- April 16, 1933, for the New York Yankees

Last MLB appearance
- September 29, 1937, for the New York Giants

MLB statistics
- Win–loss record: 21–12
- Earned run average: 4.19
- Strikeouts: 172
- Stats at Baseball Reference

Teams
- New York Yankees (1933); Cincinnati Reds (1934–1937); New York Giants (1937)

James Donald Brennan (December 2, 1903 – April 26, 1953) was an American Major League Baseball pitcher who played from 1933 to 1937 with several teams. He batted and threw right-handed. Brennan had a 21–12 record with a 4.19 earned run average over 397 innings pitched in 141 career games. In his final year, he pitched for the National League champion New York Giants against their crosstown rival New York Yankees, tossing 3 scoreless innings across 2 games in the 1937 World Series.

Brennan was an alumnus of Georgetown University.
