= Alex Kampouris =

American baseball player (1912–1993)

- Second baseman
- Born: November 13, 1912; Sacramento, California, U.S.
- Died: May 29, 1993 (aged 80); Sacramento, California, U.S.
- Batted: Right Threw: Right

MLB debut
- July 31, 1934, for the Cincinnati Reds

Last MLB appearance
- September 23, 1943, for the Washington Senators

MLB statistics
- Batting average: .243
- Home runs: 45
- Runs batted in: 284
- Stats at Baseball Reference

Teams
- Cincinnati Reds (1934–1938); New York Giants (1938–1939); Brooklyn Dodgers (1941–1943); Washington Senators (1943)

Alexander William Kampouris (Greek: Αλέξανδρος Βασίλειος Καμπούρης; November 13, 1912 – May 29, 1993) was an American professional baseball player who played in the Major Leagues primarily as a second baseman from 1934 to 1939 and 1941 to 1943.

In 708 games over nine seasons, Kampouris posted a .243 batting average (531-for-2182) with 272 runs, 45 home runs, 284 RBI and 244 bases on balls. He recorded an overall .962 fielding percentage.

== Miscellaneous facts ==
- Kampouris is considered the first ever Major League player of Greek descent.
- On May 9, 1937, Kampouris hit three home runs in one game for the Reds against the Philadelphia Phillies.
- On August 13, 1937, Kampouris was honored at Wrigley Field by the Chicago Hellenic Society as a visiting member of the Reds. He was given a car and praised before the game, only to commit three errors in one inning against the Cubs that day.
