= Gene Schott =

American baseball player (1913–1992)

- Pitcher
- Born: July 14, 1913; Batavia, Ohio, U.S.
- Died: November 16, 1992 (aged 79); Sun City Center, Florida, U.S.
- Batted: Right Threw: Right

MLB debut
- April 16, 1935, for the Cincinnati Reds

Last MLB appearance
- June 20, 1939, for the Brooklyn Dodgers

MLB statistics
- Win–loss record: 28–41
- Earned run average: 3.72
- Strikeouts: 192
- Stats at Baseball Reference

Teams
- Cincinnati Reds (1935–1938); Philadelphia Phillies (1939); Brooklyn Dodgers (1939)

Arthur Eugene Schott (July 14, 1913 – November 16, 1992) was an American Major League Baseball pitcher from 1935 to 1939, primarily for the Cincinnati Reds.

Born in Batavia, Ohio, Schott died in Sun City Center, Florida, in 1992, aged 79.
