= Gilly Campbell =

American baseball player (1908–1973)

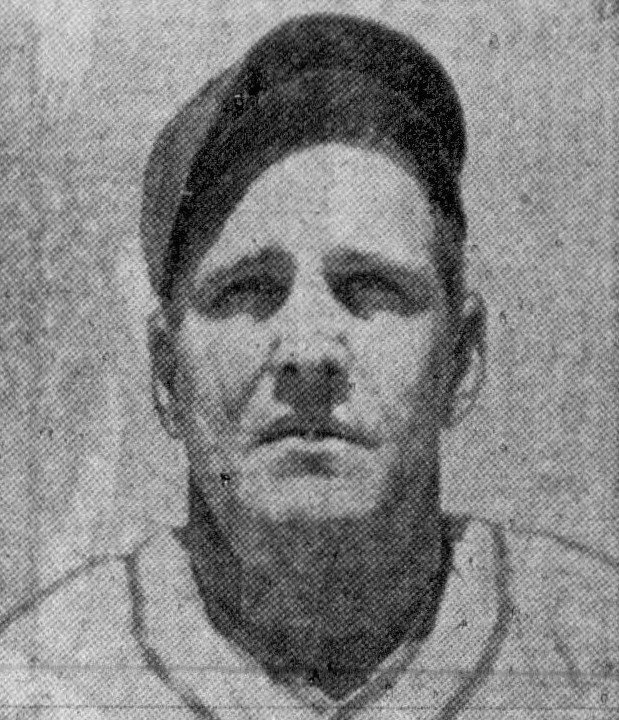
- Campbell, circa 1942
- Catcher
- Born: February 13, 1908; Kansas City, Kansas, U.S.
- Died: February 21, 1973 (aged 65); Los Angeles, California, U.S.
- Batted: Left Threw: Right

MLB debut
- April 25, 1933, for the Chicago Cubs

Last MLB appearance
- October 2, 1938, for the Brooklyn Dodgers

MLB statistics
- Batting average: .263
- Home runs: 5
- Runs batted in: 93
- Stats at Baseball Reference

Teams
- Chicago Cubs (1933); Cincinnati Reds (1935–1937); Brooklyn Dodgers (1938)

William Gilthorpe Campbell (February 13, 1908 – February 21, 1973) was an American Major League Baseball catcher. He played all or part of five seasons in the majors between 1933 and 1938.

In 295 games over five seasons, Campbell posted a .263 batting average (186-for-708) with 78 runs, 5 home runs, 93 RBI and 116 bases on balls. He finished his major league career with a .975 fielding percentage.
