= List of Major League Baseball players (Ho–Hz) =

The following is a list of Major League Baseball players, retired or active.

== Ho through Hz ==
Myril Hoag
Don Hoak
Ed Hobaugh
Glen Hobbie
Bill Hobbs
John Hobbs
Dick Hoblitzel
Butch Hobson
Harry Hoch
Luke Hochevar
Ed Hock
Chuck Hockenbery
Oris Hockett
George Hockette
Denny Hocking
Johnny Hodapp
Mel Hoderlein
Charlie Hodes
Ed Hodge
Gomer Hodge
Shovel Hodge
Bert Hodges
Gil Hodges
Kevin Hodges
Ron Hodges
Trey Hodges
Ralph Hodgin
Paul Hodgson
Eli Hodkey
Charlie Hodnett
George Hodson
Billy Hoeft
Art Hoelskoetter
Joe Hoerner
Lefty Hoerst
Jack Hoey
Jim Hoey
Chet Hoff
Bill Hoffer
Stew Hofferth
Bill Hoffman
Danny Hoffman
Dutch Hoffman
Frank Hoffman
Glenn Hoffman
Guy Hoffman
Izzy Hoffman
John Hoffman
Larry Hoffman
Ray Hoffman
Sonny Hoffman
Tex Hoffman
Trevor Hoffman
Jamie Hoffmann
Jesse Hoffmeister
John Hofford
Jarrett Hoffpauir
Micah Hoffpauir
Bobby Hofman
Solly Hofman
Fred Hofmann
Bob Hogan
George Hogan
Kenny Hogan
Malachi Hogan
Marty Hogan
Mortimer Hogan
Shanty Hogan
Willie Hogan
Bert Hogg
Bill Hogg
Brad Hogg
George Hogreiver
Elon Hogsett
Bobby Hogue
Cal Hogue
Bill Hohman
Eddie Hohnhorst
Chris Hoiles
Aaron Holbert
Bill Holbert
Ray Holbert
Wally Holborow
Sammy Holbrook
Ken Holcombe
Bill Holden
Joe Holden
David Holdridge
Fred Holdsworth
Jim Holdsworth
Walter Holke
Bill Hollahan
Al Holland
Bill Holland
Derek Holland
Dutch Holland
Greg Holland
Mul Holland
Will Holland
Todd Hollandsworth
Gary Holle
Ed Holley
Bug Holliday
Matt Holliday
Mike Hollimon
Carl Holling
Holly Hollingshead
Al Hollingsworth
Bonnie Hollingsworth
Damon Hollins
Dave Hollins
Jessie Hollins
John Hollison
Stan Hollmig
Charlie Hollocher
Bobo Holloman
Jim Holloway
Ken Holloway
Ed Holly
Jeff Holly
Billy Holm
Steve Holm
Wattie Holm
Brad Holman
Brian Holman
Gary Holman
Scott Holman
Shawn Holman
Chick Holmes
Darren Holmes
Ducky Holmes (OF)
Ducky Holmes (C)
Fred Holmes
Jim Holmes
Tommy Holmes
Herm Holshouser
Chris Holt
Jim Holt
Red Holt
Roger Holt
Vern Holtgrave
Brian Holton
Mike Holtz
Ken Holtzman
Mark Holzemer
Marty Honan
Rick Honeycutt
Abie Hood
Don Hood
Wally Hood (OF)
Wally Hood (P)
Chris Hook
Jay Hook
Buck Hooker
Alex Hooks
Bob Hooper
Harry Hooper
Kevin Hooper
Mike Hooper
Leon Hooten
Burt Hooton
Buster Hoover
Charlie Hoover
Dick Hoover
Joe Hoover
John Hoover
Paul Hoover
John Hope
Sam Hope
Buck Hopkins
Don Hopkins
Gail Hopkins
Marty Hopkins
Mike Hopkins
Paul Hopkins
Johnny Hopp
Bill Hopper
Jim Hopper
Lefty Hopper
Norris Hopper
Patrick John Horan
Shags Horan
Joe Horgan
Joe Horlen
Sam Horn
Trader Horne
Bob Horner
Jack Horner
Rogers Hornsby
Joe Hornung
Hanson Horsey
Vince Horsman
Jeremy Horst
Oscar Horstmann
Elmer Horton
Ricky Horton
Tony Horton
Willie Horton
Brian Horwitz
Dwayne Hosey
Steve Hosey
Dave Hoskins
Tim Hosley
Eric Hosmer
Gene Host
Chuck Hostetler
Dave Hostetler
Pete Hotaling
Ken Hottman
Tommy Hottovy
Byron Houck
Sadie Houck
Charlie Hough
Ralph Houk
D. J. Houlton
Craig House
Frank House
Fred House
J. R. House
Pat House
Tom House
Charlie Householder (1B)
Charlie Householder (UP)
Ed Householder
Paul Householder
John Houseman
William Houseman
Ben Houser
James Houser
Joe Houser
Wayne Housie
Tyler Houston
Art Houtteman
Lefty Houtz
Steve Hovley
Ed Hovlik
Joe Hovlik
Ben Howard
Bruce Howard
Chris Howard (C)
Chris Howard (P)
Dave Howard
David Howard
Del Howard
Doug Howard
Earl Howard
Elston Howard
Frank Howard
Fred Howard
Ivan Howard
Larry Howard
Lee Howard
Matt Howard
Mike Howard
Paul Howard
Ryan Howard
Steve Howard
Thomas Howard
Wilbur Howard
Jim Howarth
Art Howe
Cal Howe
Les Howe
Shorty Howe
Steve Howe
Dixie Howell (P)
Dixie Howell (C)
Harry Howell
J. P. Howell
Jack Howell
Jay Howell
Ken Howell
Pat Howell
Red Howell
Roland Howell
Roy Howell
Bill Howerton
Dann Howitt
Dan Howley
Bob Howry
Dick Howser
Dummy Hoy
Peter Hoy
Tex Hoyle
LaMarr Hoyt
Waite Hoyt
Al Hrabosky
Kent Hrbek
Walt Hriniak
Chin-lung Hu
Al Hubbard
Glenn Hubbard
Mike Hubbard
Trenidad Hubbard
Bill Hubbell
Carl Hubbell
Ken Hubbs
Clarence Huber
Jon Huber
Justin Huber
Otto Huber
Ken Huckaby
Earl Huckleberry
John Hudek
Dave Hudgens
Jimmy Hudgens
Rex Hudler
Willis Hudlin
Charles Hudson
Charlie Hudson
Daniel Hudson
Hal Hudson
Jesse Hudson
Joe Hudson (catcher)
Joe Hudson (pitcher)
Johnny Hudson
Kyle Hudson
Luke Hudson
Nat Hudson
Orlando Hudson
Rex Hudson
Sid Hudson
Tim Hudson
Frank Huelsman
Al Huenke
Aubrey Huff
David Huff
Mike Huff
Ben Huffman
Chad Huffman
Phil Huffman
Ed Hug
Miller Huggins
Bill Hughes (1B)
Bill Hughes (P)
Bobby Hughes
Dick Hughes
Dusty Hughes
Ed Hughes
Jared Hughes
Jay Hughes
Jim Hughes (1950s P)
Jim Hughes (1970s P)
Joe Hughes
Keith Hughes
Luke Hughes
Mickey Hughes
Phil Hughes
Rhyne Hughes
Roy Hughes
Terry Hughes
Tom Hughes (P born 1878)
Tom Hughes (P born 1884)
Tom Hughes (P born 1934)
Tom Hughes (OF)
Tommy Hughes
Travis Hughes
Vern Hughes
Jim Hughey
Tex Hughson
Emil Huhn
Justin Huisman
Rick Huisman
Mark Huismann
Billy Hulen
Tim Hulett
Tug Hulett
Harry Hulihan
Eric Hull
David Hulse
Rudy Hulswitt
Hank Hulvey
Philip Humber
Tom Hume
John Hummel
Tim Hummel
Al Humphrey
Byron Humphrey
Terry Humphrey
Bob Humphreys
Mike Humphreys
Bert Humphries
John Humphries
Johnny Humphries
Nick Hundley
Randy Hundley
Todd Hundley
Bernie Hungling
Bill Hunnefield
Ben Hunt
Dick Hunt
Joel Hunt
Ken Hunt (OF)
Ken Hunt (P)
Randy Hunt
Ron Hunt
Bill Hunter (C)
Bill Hunter (OF)
Billy Hunter
Brian Hunter (1B)
Brian Hunter (OF)
Buddy Hunter
Catfish Hunter
Cedric Hunter
Eddie Hunter
George Hunter
Herb Hunter
Jim Hunter
Lem Hunter
Newt Hunter
Rich Hunter
Tommy Hunter
Torii Hunter
Willard Hunter
Steve Huntz
Walt Huntzinger
Dave Huppert
Tom Hurd
Clint Hurdle
Dick Hurley
Eric Hurley
Jerry Hurley (1890s C)
Jerry Hurley (1900s C)
Bill Hurst
Bruce Hurst
Don Hurst
James Hurst
Jimmy Hurst
Jonathan Hurst
Edwin Hurtado
Butch Huskey
Jeff Huson
Carl Husta
Bill Husted
Bert Husting
Harry Huston
Warren Huston
Joe Hutcheson
Johnny Hutchings
Chad Hutchinson
Ed Hutchinson
Fred Hutchinson
Ira Hutchinson
Bill Hutchison
Herb Hutson
Roy Hutson
Jim Hutto
Mark Hutton
Tommy Hutton
Ham Hyatt
Dick Hyde
Tim Hyers
William Hyndman
Pat Hynes
Adam Hyzdu
