= Philadelphia Phillies all-time roster (H) =

List of baseball players

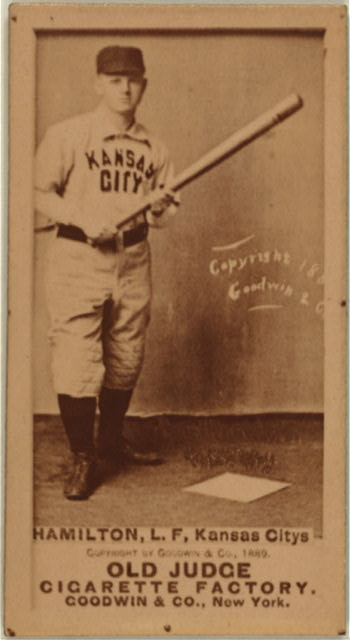
Billy Hamilton, a Hall of Famer and member of the Philadelphia Baseball Wall of Fame, is the franchise leader in batting average, on-base percentage, and stolen bases, in addition to holding three single-season records.

The Philadelphia Phillies are a Major League Baseball team based in Philadelphia, Pennsylvania. They are a member of the Eastern Division of Major League Baseball's National League. The team has played officially under two names since beginning play in 1883: the current moniker, as well as the "Quakers", which was used in conjunction with "Phillies" during the team's early history. The team was also known unofficially as the "Blue Jays" during the World War II era. Since the franchise's inception, 2,081 players have made an appearance in a competitive game for the team, whether as an offensive player (batting and baserunning) or a defensive player (fielding, pitching, or both).

Of those 2,081 Phillies, 133 have had surnames beginning with the letter H. One of those players has been inducted into the Baseball Hall of Fame; center fielder Billy Hamilton played for the Phillies for six seasons (1890–1895), amassing three career franchise records and three single-season records. Hamilton's .361 batting average, .463 on-base percentage, and 508 stolen bases lead all Phillies in those categories, and his single-season records include most runs scored (192 in the 1894 season; also a major league record), most stolen bases (111 in the 1891 season), and highest on-base percentage (.523 in 1894). The Hall of Fame lists the Phillies as Hamilton's primary team, and he is a member of the Philadelphia Baseball Wall of Fame, as is Whiz Kid shortstop and second baseman Granny Hamner.

Among the 73 batters in this list, Lou Hardie has the highest batting average, at .375; he notched three hits in eight at-bats during the 1884 season. Other players with an average above .300 include Hamilton, George Harper (.323 in three seasons), Chicken Hawks (.322 in one season), Butch Henline (.304 in six seasons), Chuck Hiller (.302 in one season), Walter Holke (.301 in three seasons), Paul Hoover (.308 in two seasons), and Don Hurst (.303 in seven seasons). Ryan Howard leads all members of this list with 253 home runs and 748 runs batted in in his seven seasons with the Phillies.

Of this list's 62 pitchers, Bert Humphries has the best win–loss record, in terms of winning percentage; his three wins and one loss notched him a .750 win ratio in his one season with the team. Cole Hamels' 74 victories and 1,091 strikeouts are the most by a player on this list, while Ken Heintzelman and Bill Hubbell lead with 55 defeats each. Tom Hilgendorf has the lowest earned run average (ERA) among pitchers, with a 2.14 mark; the only player to best Hilgendorf in that category on this list is Holke, a first baseman, who made one pitching appearance in 1979, throwing 1/3 inning and allowing no runs (a 0.00 ERA). Roy Halladay is one of the ten Phillies pitchers who have thrown a no-hitter, and the only man to accomplish the feat twice; in Halladay's first season with Philadelphia, he pitched a perfect game on May 29, 2010, and later became the second player to pitch a no-hitter in the postseason on October 6, 2010.

Two Phillies have made 30% or more of their Phillies appearances as both pitchers and position player. Bill Harman batted .071 in 14 plate appearances as a catcher while amassing a 4.85 ERA and striking out three as a pitcher. Hardie Henderson allowed 19 runs in his only game as a pitcher while notching a .250 average as a left fielder.

Key to symbols in player list(s)
† or ‡	Indicates a member of the National Baseball Hall of Fame and Museum; ‡ indicates that the Phillies are the player's primary team^{[H]}
§	Indicates a member of the Philadelphia Baseball Wall of Fame
*	Indicates a team record^{[R]}
(#)	A number following a player's name indicates that the number was retired by the Phillies in the player's honor.
Year	Italic text indicates that the player is a member of the Phillies' active (25-man) roster.
Position(s)	Indicates the player's primary position(s)^{[P]}
Notes	Statistics shown only for playing time with Phillies^{[S]}
Ref	References

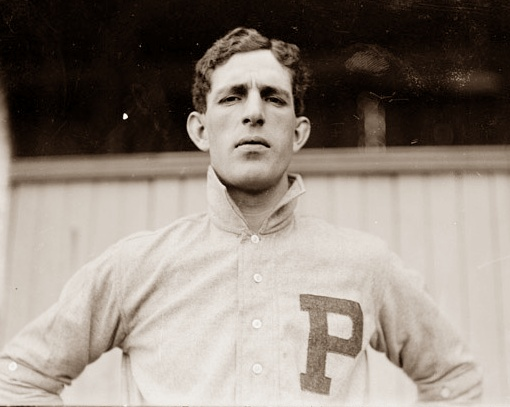
Bob Hall played more than 30% of his games as a Phillie as both a third baseman and a shortstop.

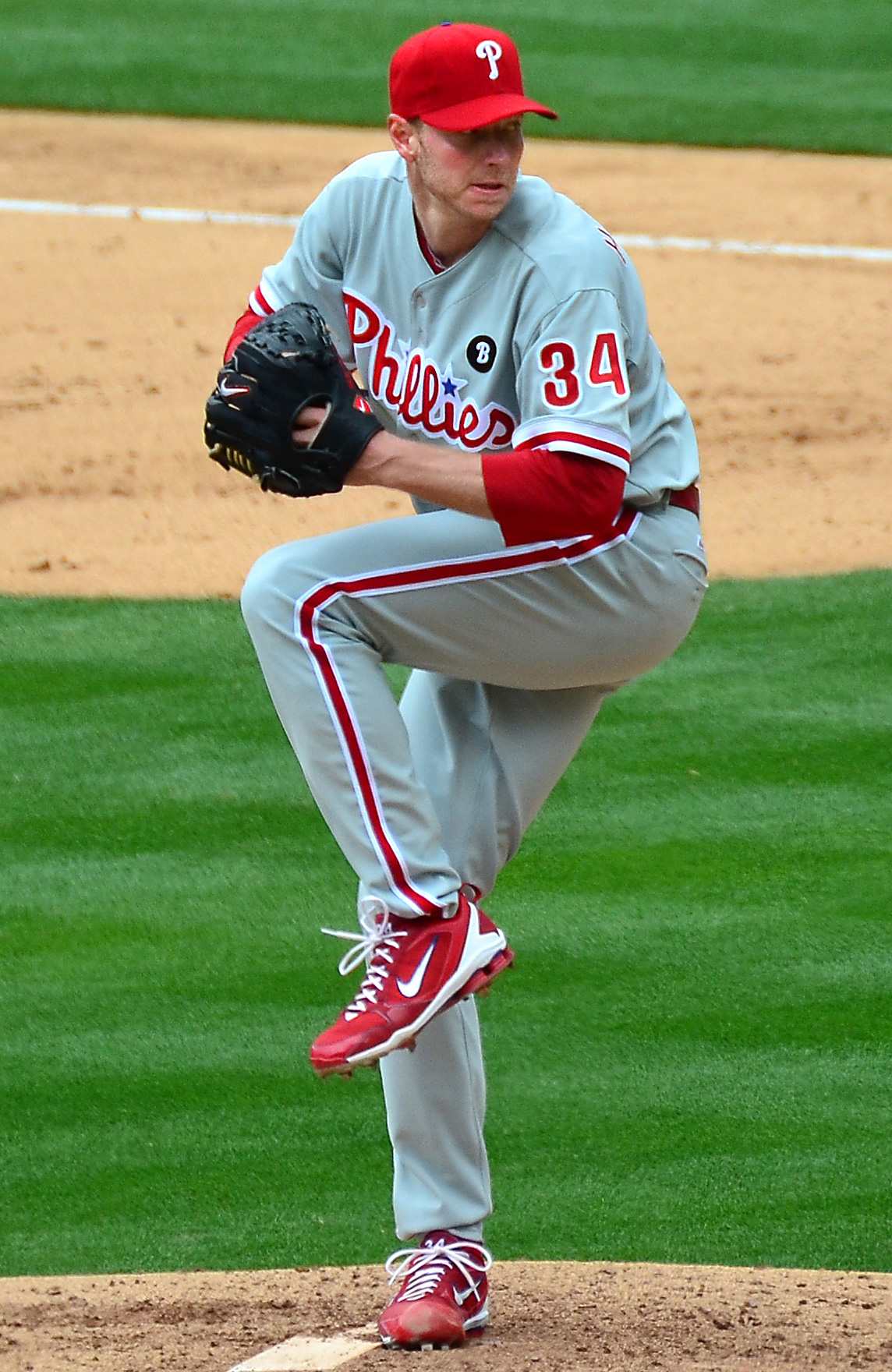
Roy Halladay is the only pitcher in Phillies history to throw multiple no-hitters with the team.

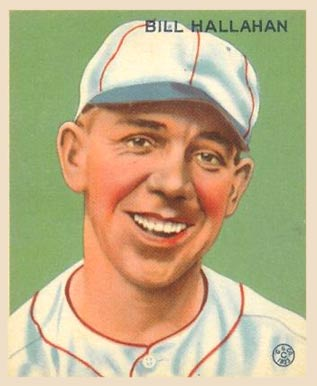
Bill Hallahan struck out 22 batters in a single season with Philadelphia.

Bill Hallman had three separate tenures with the Phillies: 1888–1889; 1892–1897; and 1901–1903.

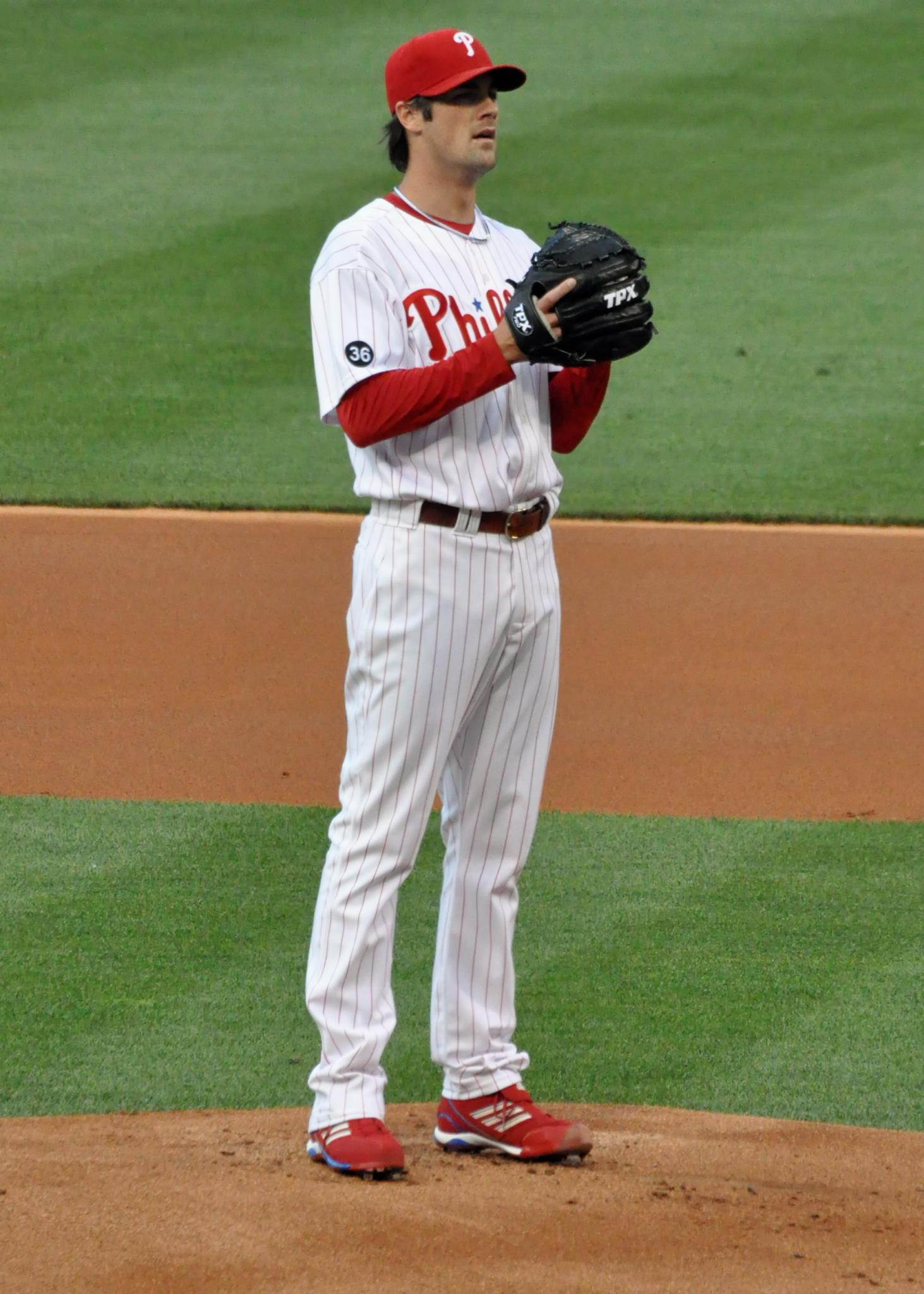
Cole Hamels won both the NLCS MVP and the World Series MVP Awards in 2008.

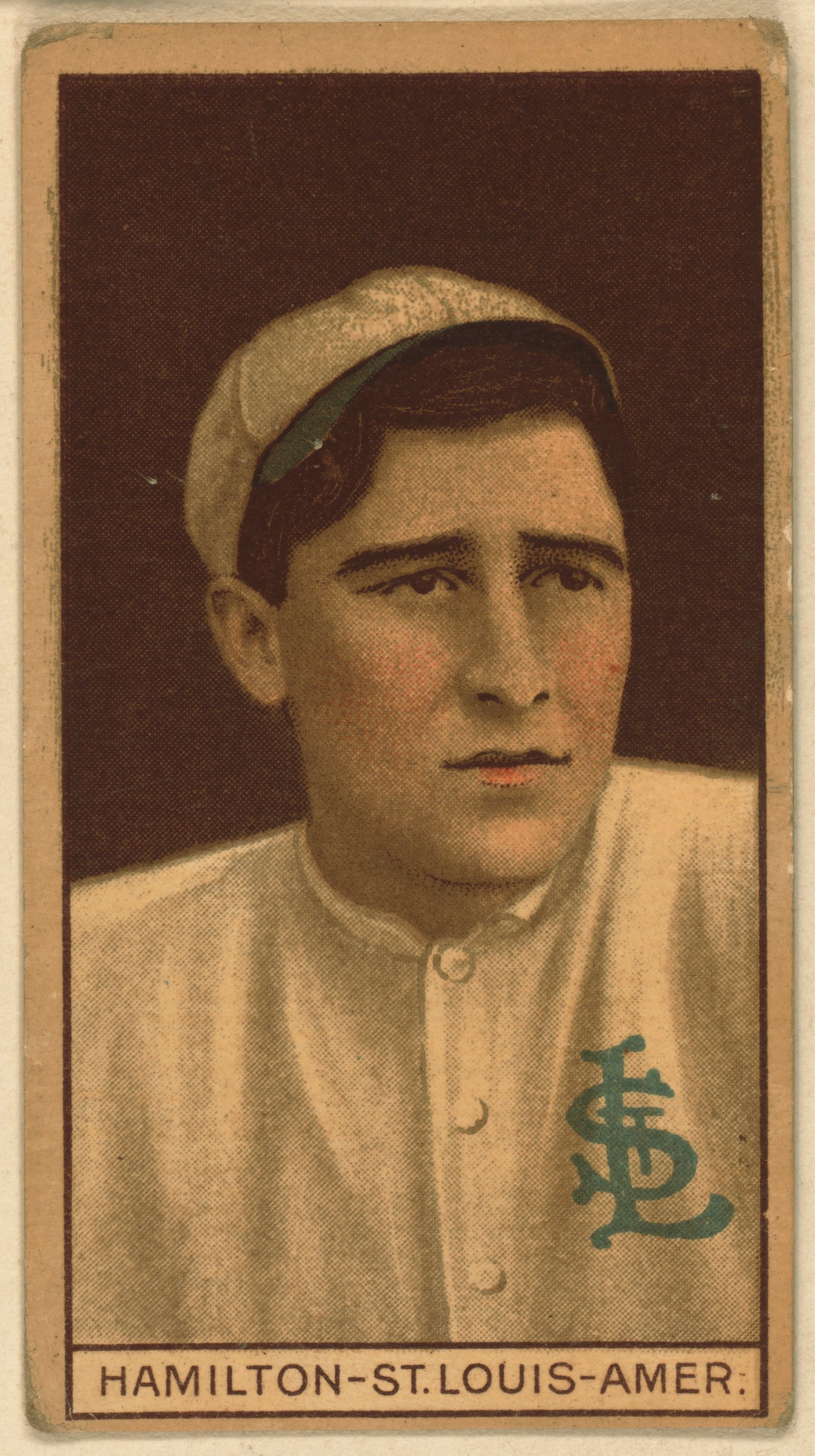
Pitcher Earl Hamilton lost his only decision with Philadelphia.

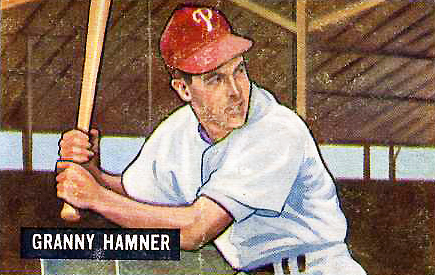
Granny Hamner, shortstop for the Whiz Kids, is a member of the Philadelphia Baseball Wall of Fame.

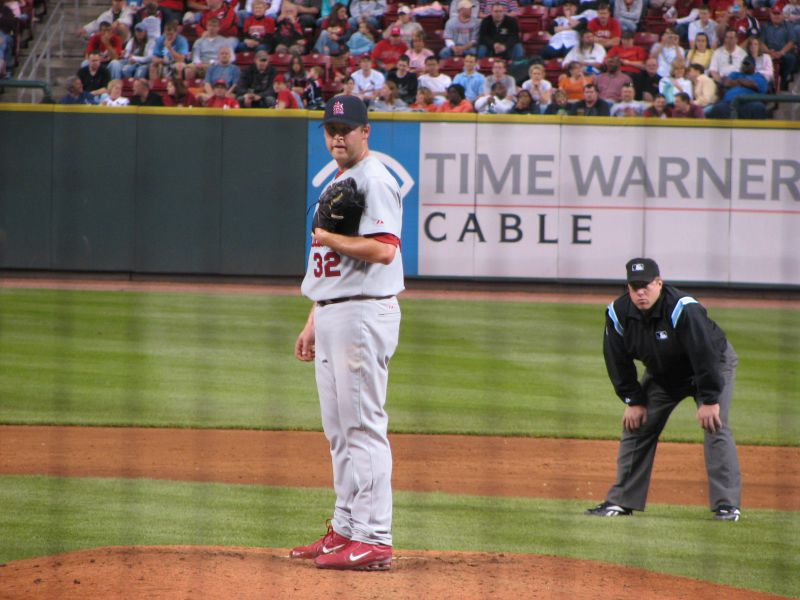
Pitcher Josh Hancock was killed in a car accident during the 2007 season.

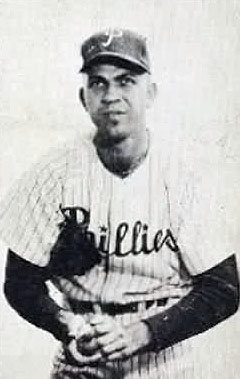
Andy Hansen pitched for Philadelphia from 1951 to 1953.

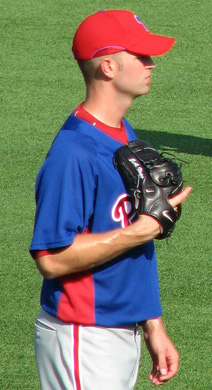
J. A. Happ was traded from Philadelphia to the Houston Astros during the 2010 season.

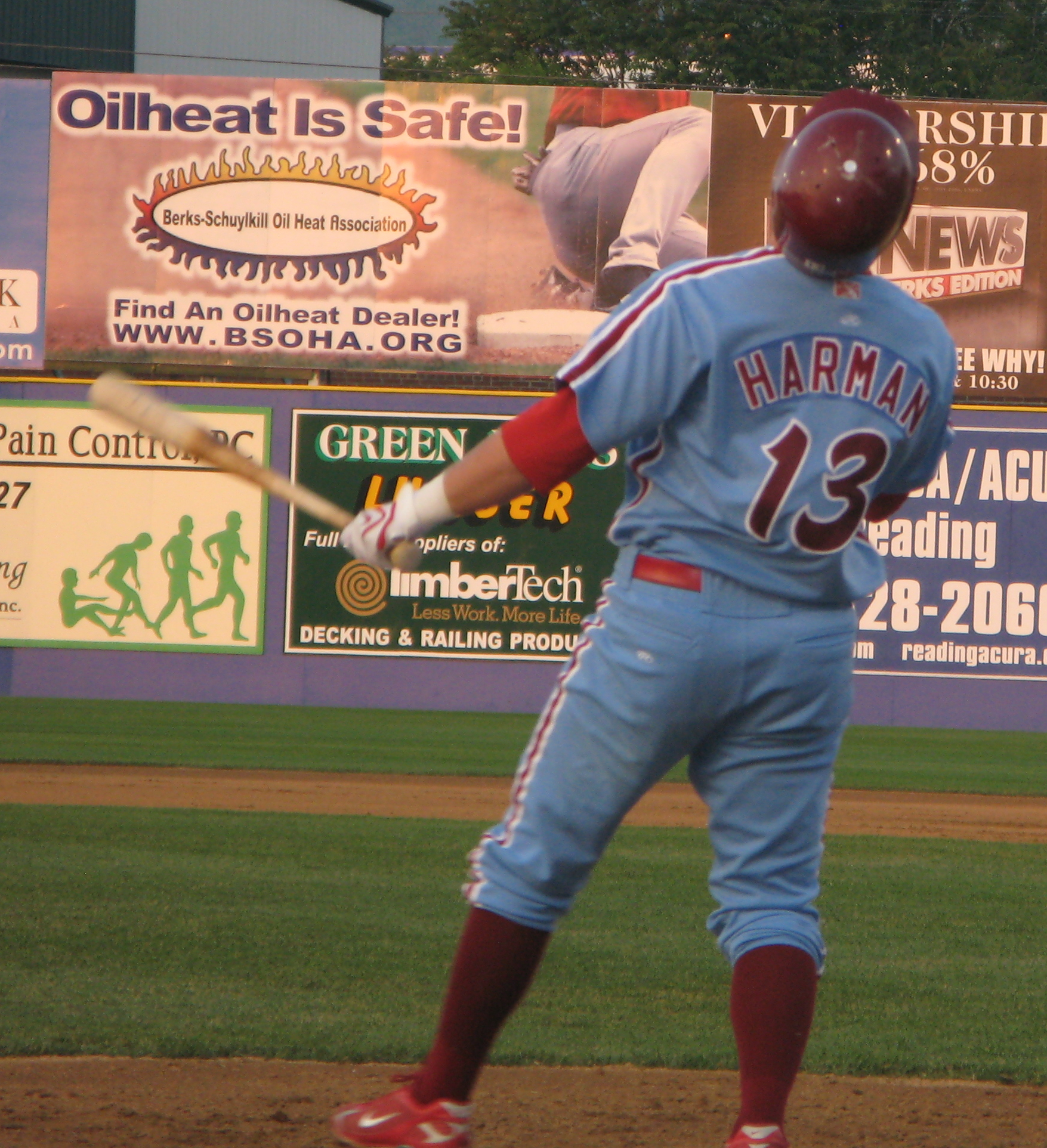
Brad Harman, a second baseman, played for the Phillies in 2008.

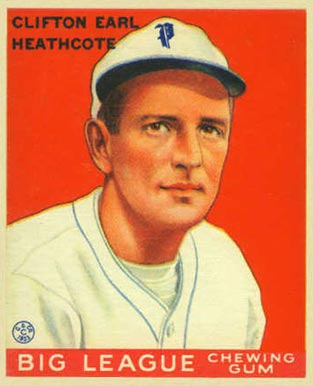
Cliff Heathcote had one home run and five runs batted in during his only Phillies season.

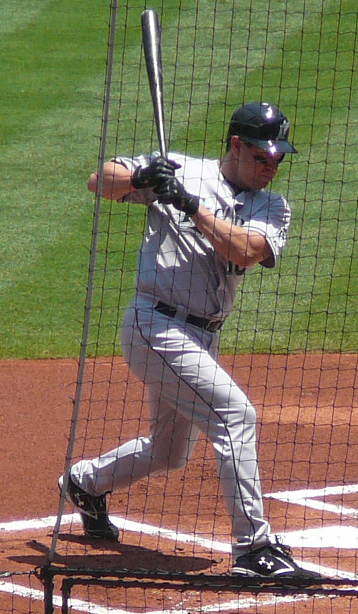
Wes Helms played with Philadelphia during the 2007 season.

Second baseman Tom Herr, originally from nearby Lancaster, later returned to his hometown to manage the independent Lancaster Barnstormers.

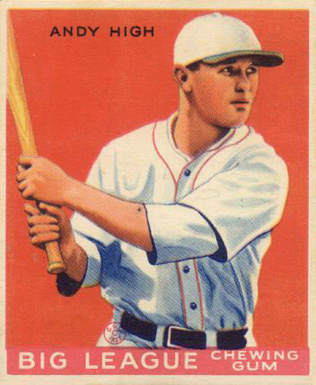
Andy High hit two doubles in his only season with the Phillies.

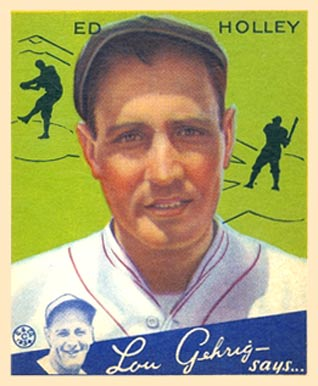
Ed Holley pitched three seasons for Philadelphia, amassing a 25–37 record.

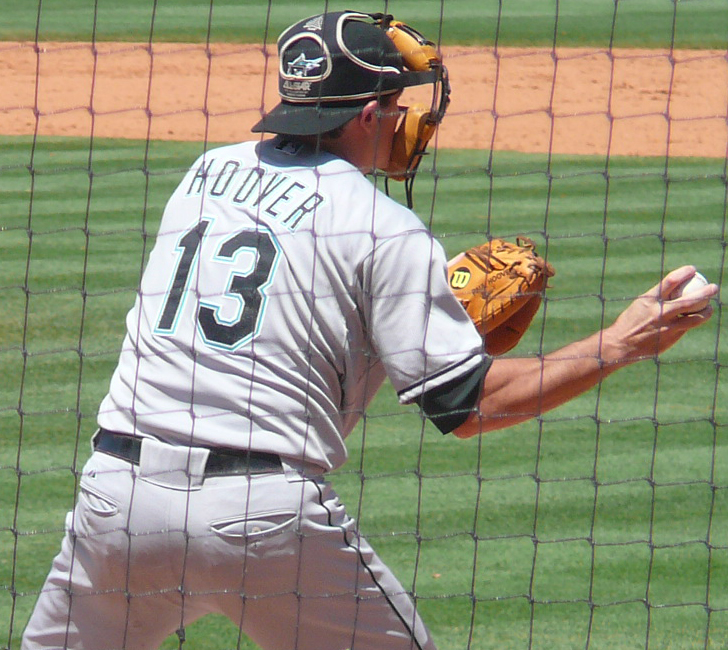
Paul Hoover played in parts of two seasons for the Phillies.

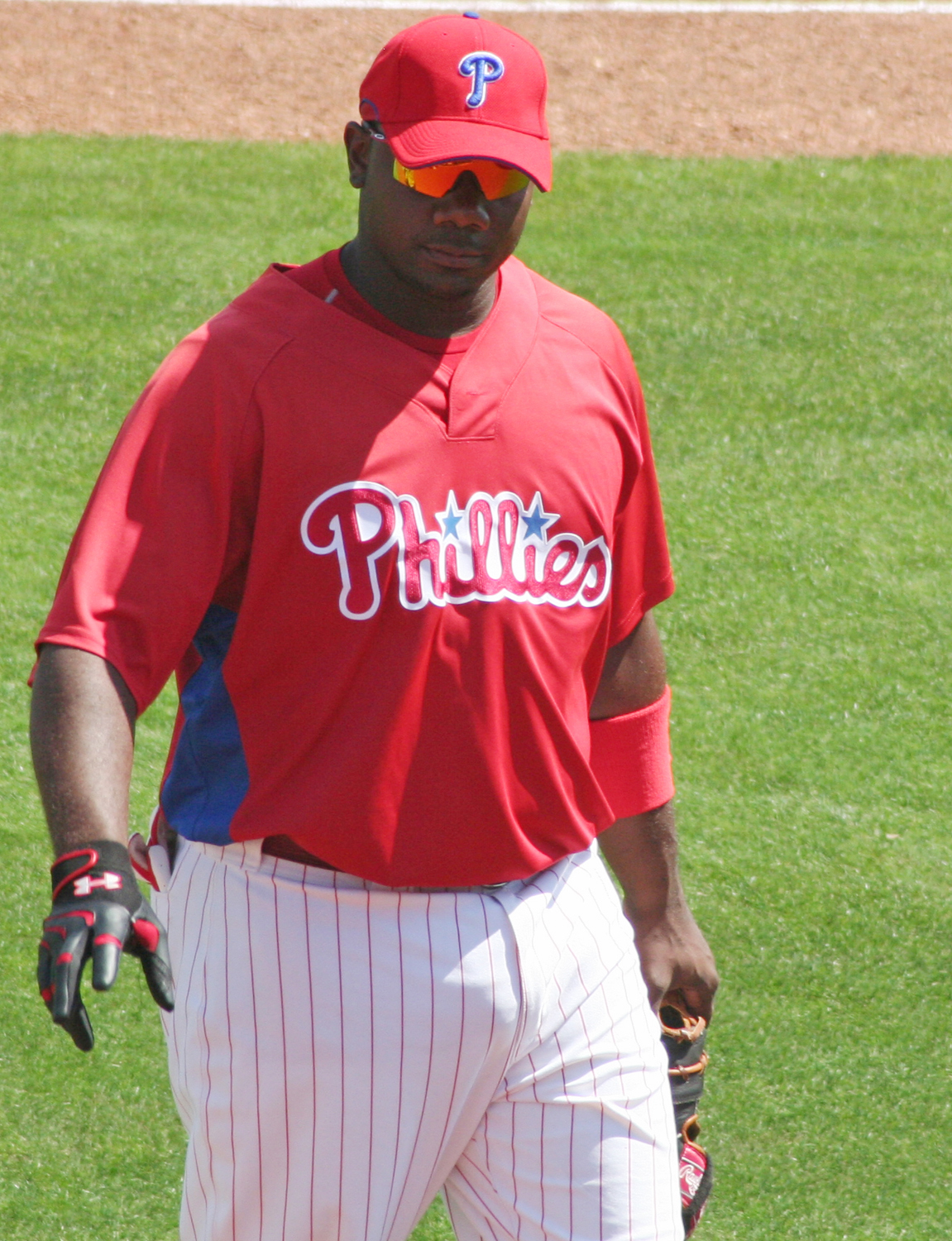
As of the end of 2010, Ryan Howard's 253 home runs ranked third all-time on the Phillies' career leaders list.

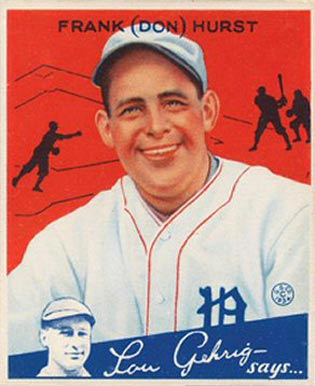
Don Hurst had a seven-season Phillies career as a first baseman, batting in nearly 600 runs.

List of players whose surnames begin with H, showing season(s) and position(s) played and selected statistics
Name	Season(s)	Position(s)	Notes	Ref
Bert Haas	1948–1949	Third baseman First baseman	.281 batting average; 4 home runs; 34 runs batted in	
Warren Hacker	1957–1958	Pitcher	4–5 record; 5.04 earned run average; 37 strikeouts	
Harvey Haddix	1956–1957	Pitcher	22–21 record; 3.74 earned run average; 290 strikeouts	
George Haddock	1894	Pitcher	4–3 record; 5.79 earned run average; 7 strikeouts	
Bud Hafey	1939	Right fielder	.176 batting average; 1 double; 3 runs batted in	
Art Hagan	1883	Pitcher	1–14 record; 5.45 earned run average; 39 strikeouts	
Don Hahn	1975	Center fielder	.000 batting average; 6 plate appearances; 2 strikeouts	
Jim Haislip	1913	Pitcher	6.00 earned run average; 3 walks; 3 innings pitched	
Bert Hall	1911	Pitcher	0–1 record; 4.00 earned run average; 8 strikeouts	
Bob Hall	1904	Third baseman Shortstop	.160 batting average; 4 doubles; 17 runs batted in	
Dick Hall	1967–1968	Pitcher	14–9 record; 3.14 earned run average; 80 strikeouts	
Roy Halladay	2010–2011	Pitcher	40–16 record; 2.40 earned run average; 439 strikeouts	
Bill Hallahan	1938	Pitcher	1–8 record; 5.46 earned run average; 22 strikeouts	
Bill Hallman	1888–1889; 1892–1897; 1901–1903	Second baseman	.274 batting average; 12 home runs; 574 runs batted in	
Cole Hamels	2006–2011	Pitcher	74–54 record; 3.39 earned run average; 1,091 strikeouts	
Billy Hamilton^{‡§}	1890–1895	Left fielder Center fielder	.361 batting average*; .463 on-base percentage*; 23 home runs; 370 runs batted in; 510 stolen bases*	
Earl Hamilton	1924	Pitcher	0–1 record; 10.50 earned run average; 2 strikeouts	
Jack Hamilton	1962–1963	Pitcher	11–13 record; 5.14 earned run average; 124 strikeouts	
Garvin Hamner	1945	Second baseman	.198 batting average; 3 doubles; 5 runs batted in	
Granny Hamner^{§}	1944–1959	Shortstop; Second baseman	.263 batting average; 103 home runs; 705 runs batted in	
Ray Hamrick	1943–1944	Shortstop	.204 batting average; 1 home run; 32 runs batted in	
Josh Hancock	2003–2004	Pitcher	0–1 record; 7.50 earned run average; 9 strikeouts	
Lee Handley	1947	Third baseman	.253 batting average; 10 doubles; 42 runs batted in	
Harry Hanebrink	1959	Second baseman Third baseman	.258 batting average; 1 home run; 7 runs batted in	
Andy Hansen	1951–1953	Pitcher	8–9 record; 3.33 earned run average; 46 strikeouts	
Snipe Hansen	1930; 1932–1935	Pitcher	22–44 record; 4.84 earned run average; 168 strikeouts	
J. A. Happ	2007–2010	Pitcher	14–5 record; 3.11 earned run average; 159 strikeouts	
Bill Harbridge	1883	Center fielder	.221 batting average; 12 doubles; 21 runs batted in	
Lou Hardie	1884	Catcher	.375 batting average; 2 doubles; 8 plate appearances	
Bill Harman	1941	Catcher; Pitcher	.071 batting average; 14 plate appearances; 4.85 earned run average; 3 strikeouts	
Brad Harman	2008	Second baseman	.100 batting average; 1 double; 1 run batted in	
Chuck Harmon	1957	Left fielder	.256 batting average; 2 doubles; 5 runs batted in	
Terry Harmon	1967; 1969–1977	Second baseman Shortstop	.233 batting average; 4 home runs; 72 runs batted in	
George W. Harper	1924–1926	Right fielder	.323 batting average; 41 home runs; 190 runs batted in	
J. George Harper	1894	Pitcher	6–6 record; 5.32 earned run average; 24 strikeouts	
Ray Harrell	1939	Pitcher	3–7 record; 5.42 earned run average; 35 strikeouts	
Bud Harrelson	1978–1979	Second baseman	.241 batting average; 7 doubles; 16 runs batted in	
Mickey Harrington	1963	Pinch runner^{[a]}	1 game played; 0 plate appearances	
Gene Harris	1995	Pitcher	2–2 record; 4.26 earned run average; 9 strikeouts	
Greg Harris	1988–1989	Pitcher	6–8 record; 2.86 earned run average; 122 strikeouts	
Herb Harris	1936	Pitcher	10.29 earned run average; 5 walks; 7 innings pitched	
Reggie Harris	1997	Pitcher	1–3 record; 5.30 earned run average; 45 strikeouts	
Mike Hartley	1991–1992	Pitcher	9–7 record; 3.54 earned run average; 72 strikeouts	
Ray Hartranft	1913	Pitcher	9.00 earned run average; 1 strikeout; 1 walk	
Don Hasenmayer	1945–1946	Second baseman Third baseman	.100 batting average; 1 double; 1 run batted in	
Mickey Haslin	1933–1936	Shortstop; Second baseman	.269 batting average; 4 home runs; 78 runs batted in	
Billy Hatcher	1994	Center fielder	.246 batting average; 2 home runs; 13 runs batted in	
Chicken Hawks	1925	First baseman	.322 batting average; 5 home runs; 45 runs batted in	
Austin Hays	2024-Present	Left Fielder		
Charlie Hayes	1989–1991; 1995	Third baseman	.256 batting average; 41 home runs; 238 runs batted in	
Von Hayes	1983–1991	Right fielder First baseman Center fielder	.272 batting average; 124 home runs; 568 runs batted in	
Ralph Head	1923	Pitcher	2–9 record; 6.66 earned run average; 24 strikeouts	
Jim Hearn	1957–1959	Pitcher	10–6 record; 4.04 earned run average; 80 strikeouts	
Cliff Heathcote	1932	First baseman	.282 batting average; 1 home run; 5 runs batted in	
Richie Hebner	1977–1978	First baseman	.284 batting average; 35 home runs; 133 runs batted in	
Bronson Heflin	1996	Pitcher	6.75 earned run average; 4 strikeouts; 3 walks	
Jim Hegan	1958–1959	Catcher	.209 batting average; 7 doubles; 14 runs batted in	
Ken Heintzelman	1947–1952	Pitcher	40–55 record; 3.75 earned run average; 291 strikeouts	
Wes Helms	2007	Third baseman	.246 batting average; 5 home runs; 39 runs batted in	
Heinie Heltzel	1944	Shortstop	.182 batting average; 1 double; 2 walks	
Ed Hemingway	1918	Second baseman	.213 batting average; 4 doubles; 12 runs batted in	
Rollie Hemsley	1946–1947	Catcher	.225 batting average; 4 doubles; 12 runs batted in	
Solly Hemus	1956–1958	Second baseman	.269 batting average; 13 home runs; 65 runs batted in	
Hardie Henderson	1883	Left fielder Pitcher	.250 batting average; 1 run batted in; 0–1 record; 19.00 earned run average	
Harvey Hendrick	1934	Left fielder	.293 batting average; 8 doubles; 19 runs batted in	
Butch Henline	1921–1926	Catcher	.304 batting average; 36 home runs; 231 runs batted in	
George Hennessey	1942	Pitcher	1–1 record; 2.65 earned run average; 2 strikeouts	
Fritz Henrich	1924	Center fielder Left fielder Right fielder	.211 batting average; 4 doubles; 4 runs batted in	
Jim Henry	1939	Pitcher	0–1 record; 5.09 earned run average; 7 strikeouts	
Ray Herbert	1965–1966	Pitcher	7–13 record; 3.98 earned run average; 66 strikeouts	
Jesús Hernáiz	1974	Pitcher	2–3 record; 5.88 earned run average; 16 strikeouts	
José Hernández	2006	Third baseman	.250 batting average; 1 home run; 7 runs batted in	
Roberto Hernández	2004	Pitcher	3–5 record; 4.76 earned run average; 44 strikeouts	
Willie Hernández	1983	Pitcher	8–4 record; 3.29 earned run average; 75 strikeouts	
Yoel Hernández	2007	Pitcher	5.28 earned run average; 13 strikeouts; 1 walk	
David Herndon	2010–2011	Pitcher	2–7 record; 3.79 earned run average; 68 strikeouts	
Tom Herr	1989–1990	Second baseman	.277 batting average; 6 home runs; 87 runs batted in	
Pancho Herrera	1958; 1960–1961	First baseman	.271 batting average; 31 home runs; 128 runs batted in	
John Herrnstein	1962–1966	First baseman Left fielder	.222 batting average; 8 home runs; 33 runs batted in	
Ed Heusser	1938; 1948	Pitcher	3–2 record; 5.28 earned run average; 22 strikeouts	
Kirby Higbe	1939–1940	Pitcher	24–33 record; 4.17 earned run average; 216 strikeouts	
Andy High	1934	Third baseman	.206 batting average; 2 doubles; 7 runs batted in	
John Hiland	1885	Second baseman	.000 batting average; 9 plate appearances; 4 strikeouts	
Tom Hilgendorf	1975	Pitcher	7–3 record; 2.14 earned run average; 52 strikeouts	
Chuck Hiller	1967	Second baseman	.302 batting average; 1 double; 2 runs batted in	
Pat Hilly	1914	Right fielder	.300 batting average; 1 run batted in; 11 plate appearances	
Charlie Hilsey	1883	Pitcher	0–3 record; 5.54 earned run average; 8 strikeouts	
A. J. Hinch	2004	Catcher	.182 batting average; 1 double; 1 run scored	
Larry Hisle	1968–1971	Center fielder	.236 batting average; 30 home runs; 104 runs batted in	
Don Hoak	1963–1964	Third baseman	.228 batting average; 6 home runs; 24 runs batted in	
Harry Hoch	1908	Pitcher	2–1 record; 2.77 earned run average; 4 strikeouts	
Bert Hodges	1942	Third baseman	.182 batting average; 2 hits; 12 plate appearances	
Eli Hodkey	1946	Pitcher	0–1 record; 12.46 earned run average; 5 walks	
George Hodson	1895	Pitcher	1–2 record; 9.53 earned run average; 6 strikeouts	
Joe Hoerner	1970–1972; 1975	Pitcher	13–12 record; 2.28 earned run average; 128 strikeouts	
Lefty Hoerst	1940–1942; 1946–1947	Pitcher	10–33 record; 5.17 earned run average; 105 strikeouts	
Bill Hoffman	1939	Pitcher	13.50 earned run average; 1 strikeout; 7 walks	
Brad Hogg	1918–1919	Pitcher	18–25 record; 3.28 earned run average; 129 strikeouts	
Bill Hohman	1927	Left fielder	.278 batting average; 5 hits; 20 plate appearances	
Joe Holden	1934–1936	Catcher	.083 batting average; 2 hits; 1 stolen base	
Walter Holke	1923–1925	First baseman	.301 batting average; 14 home runs; 151 runs batted in	
Al Holland	1983–1985	Pitcher	13–15 record; 2.88 earned run average; 162 strikeouts	
Ed Holley	1932–1934	Pitcher	25–37 record; 4.24 earned run average; 157 strikeouts	
Al Hollingsworth	1938–1939	Pitcher	6–25 record; 4.34 earned run average; 104 strikeouts	
Dave Hollins	1990–1995; 2002	Third baseman	.257 batting average; 67 home runs; 273 runs batted in	
Stan Hollmig	1949–1951	Right fielder	.253 batting average; 2 home runs; 27 runs batted in	
Jim Holloway	1929	Pitcher	13.50 earned run average; 1 strikeout; 5 walks	
Mark Holzemer	2000	Pitcher	0–1 record; 7.71 earned run average; 19 strikeouts	
Buster Hoover	1884	Left fielder Center fielder	.190 batting average; 1 home run; 4 runs batted in	
Paul Hoover	2009–2010	Catcher	.308 batting average; 2 doubles; 3 run batted in	
Marty Hopkins	1934	Third baseman	.120 batting average; 2 doubles; 3 runs batted in	
Tyler Houston	2003	Third baseman	.278 batting average; 2 home runs; 14 runs batted in	
Ryan Howard	2004–2011	First baseman	.275 batting average; 286 home runs; 864 runs batted in	
Ken Howell	1989–1990	Pitcher	20–19 record; 3.85 earned run average; 234 strikeouts	
Dan Howley	1913	Catcher	.125 batting average; 2 doubles; 2 runs batted in	
Bill Hubbell	1920–1925	Pitcher	36–55 record; 4.77 earned run average; 140 strikeouts	
Clarence Huber	1925–1926	Third baseman	.266 batting average; 6 home runs; 88 runs batted in	
Rex Hudler	1997–1998	Center fielder	.196 batting average; 5 home runs; 12 runs batted in	
Charles Hudson	1983–1986	Pitcher	32–42 record; 3.98 earned run average; 399 strikeouts	
Keith Hughes	1987	Left fielder Right fielder	.263 batting average; 2 doubles; 10 runs batted in	
Roy Hughes	1939–1940; 1946	Second baseman	.232 batting average; 1 home run; 38 runs batted in	
Tommy Hughes	1941–1942; 1946–1947	Pitcher	31–52 record; 3.72 earned run average; 214 strikeouts	
Billy Hulen	1896	Shortstop	.265 batting average; 18 doubles; 38 runs batted in	
Rudy Hulswitt	1902–1904	Shortstop	.255 batting average; 20 triples; 132 runs batted in	
Tom Hume	1986–1987	Pitcher	5–5 record; 3.98 earned run average; 80 strikeouts	
Bert Humphries	1910–1911	Pitcher	3–1 record; 4.26 earned run average; 16 strikeouts	
Johnny Humphries	1946	Pitcher	4.01 earned run average; 10 strikeouts; 9 walks	
Brian L. Hunter	2001	Left fielder Center fielder	.276 batting average; 2 home runs; 16 runs batted in	
Brian R. Hunter	2000	First baseman	.210 batting average; 7 home runs; 22 runs batted in	
Rich Hunter	1996	Pitcher	3–7 record; 6.49 earned run average; 32 strikeouts	
Don Hurst	1928–1934	First baseman	.303 batting average; 112 home runs; 598 runs batted in	
Harry Huston	1906	Catcher	.000 batting average; 5 plate appearances; 1 walk	
Jim Hutto	1970	Left fielder First baseman	.185 batting average; 3 home runs; 12 runs batted in	
Tommy Hutton	1972–1977	First baseman	.253 batting average; 19 home runs; 148 runs batted in	

== Footnotes ==
Key

- ^{H} The National Baseball Hall of Fame and Museum determines which cap a player wears on their plaque, signifying "the team with which he made his most indelible mark". The Hall of Fame considers the player's wishes in making their decision, but the Hall makes the final decision as "it is important that the logo be emblematic of the historical accomplishments of that player’s career".
- ^{P} Players are listed at a position if they appeared in 30% of their games or more during their Phillies career, as defined by Baseball-Reference. Additional positions may be shown on the Baseball-Reference website by following each player's citation.
- ^{R} Franchise batting and pitching leaders are drawn from Baseball-Reference. A total of 1,500 plate appearances are needed to qualify for batting records, and 500 innings pitched or 50 decisions are required to qualify for pitching records.
- ^{S} Statistics are correct as of the end of the 2010 Major League Baseball season.

List

- ^{a} Mickey Harrington is listed with no position by Baseball-Reference; his only career appearance was as a pinch-runner for Roy Sievers.
