= 1942 Philadelphia Phils season =

1942 Philadelphia Phils
- League: National League
- Ballpark: Shibe Park
- City: Philadelphia
- Owners: Gerald Nugent
- Managers: Hans Lobert
- Radio: WIBG (By Saam, Taylor Grant)

The 1942 Philadelphia Phils season was the 60th season in the history of the franchise. The team, managed by Hans Lobert, began their fifth season at Shibe Park. For this season only, they played as the Phils instead of the Phillies. Of the change, baseball writer George Kirksey opined prior to the season, "the gag is they wanted to get the 'lie' out of their name."

== Regular season ==
=== Season standings ===
National League
Team	W	L	Pct.	GB	Home	Road
St. Louis Cardinals	106	48	.688	—	60‍–‍17	46‍–‍31
Brooklyn Dodgers	104	50	.675	2	57‍–‍22	47‍–‍28
New York Giants	85	67	.559	20	47‍–‍31	38‍–‍36
Cincinnati Reds	76	76	.500	29	38‍–‍39	38‍–‍37
Pittsburgh Pirates	66	81	.449	36½	41‍–‍34	25‍–‍47
Chicago Cubs	68	86	.442	38	36‍–‍41	32‍–‍45
Boston Braves	59	89	.399	44	33‍–‍36	26‍–‍53
Philadelphia Phils	42	109	.278	62½	23‍–‍51	19‍–‍58

=== Record vs. opponents ===
1942 National League record Sources:
Team	BSN	BRO	CHC	CIN	NYG	PHI	PIT	STL
Boston	—	6–16	13–9	5–16–1	8–12	14–8	7–12–1	6–16
Brooklyn	16–6	—	16–6	15–7	14–8–1	18–4	16–6	9–13
Chicago	9–13	6–16	—	13–9	9–13–1	14–8	11–11	6–16
Cincinnati	16–5–1	7–15	9–13	—	9–13	16–6	12–9–1	7–15
New York	12–8	8–14–1	13–9–1	13–9	—	17–5	15–7	7–15
Philadelphia	8–14	4–18	8–14	6–16	5–17	—	6–13	5–17
Pittsburgh	12–7–1	6–16	11–11	9–12–1	7–15	13–6	—	8–14–2
St. Louis	16–6	13–9	16–6	15–7	15–7	17–5	14–8–2	—

=== Game log ===
Legend
	Phils win
	Phils loss
	Postponement
**Bold**	Phils team member

1942 Game Log
Overall Record: 42–109
April (4–12)

#	Date	Opponent	Score	Win	Loss	Save	Attendance	Record
1	April 14	Braves	1–2	Al Javery (1–0)	**Si Johnson** (0–1)	None	10,150	0–1
2	April 15	Braves	2–6	Jim Tobin (1–0)	**Cy Blanton** (0–1)	None	2,052	0–2
3	April 16	Braves	1–2 (10)	Tom Earley (1–0)	**Tommy Hughes** (0–1)	None	1,500	0–3
4	April 17	@ Dodgers	1–7	Johnny Allen (1–0)	**Lefty Hoerst** (0–1)	None	15,430	0–4
5	April 18	@ Dodgers	2–1	**Rube Melton** (1–0)	Hugh Casey (0–1)	None	11,611	1–4
6	April 19	@ Dodgers	2–6	Curt Davis (2–0)	**Cy Blanton** (0–2)	None	15,576	1–5
7	April 20	@ Giants	6–3	**Si Johnson** (1–1)	Bill McGee (1–1)	None	1,393	2–5
–	April 21	@ Giants	Postponed (inclement weather); Makeup: August 15 as a traditional double-header					
8	April 22	Giants	0–3	Dave Koslo (1–1)	**Tommy Hughes** (0–2)	None	2,000	2–6
9	April 23	Giants	2–5	Hal Schumacher (1–1)	**Johnny Podgajny** (0–1)	Ace Adams (1)	2,000	2–7
10	April 24	Dodgers	4–2	**Lefty Hoerst** (1–1)	Kirby Higbe (1–2)	None	1,893	3–7
11	April 25	Dodgers	1–4	Johnny Allen (2–0)	**Rube Melton** (1–1)	None	1,505	3–8
12	April 26 (1)	Dodgers	1–3	Curt Davis (3–0)	**Ike Pearson** (0–1)	None	see 2nd game	3–9
13	April 26 (2)	Dodgers	2–10	Ed Head (3–0)	**Tommy Hughes** (0–3)	None	21,766	3–10
14	April 28	@ Pirates	1–7	Max Butcher (2–1)	**Earl Naylor** (0–1)	None	1,752	3–11
15	April 29	@ Pirates	6–7 (10)	Rip Sewell (3–0)	**Cy Blanton** (0–3)	None	1,567	3–12
16	April 30	@ Pirates	6–3	**Lefty Hoerst** (2–1)	Johnny Lanning (0–2)	None	1,826	4–12

May (10–20)

#	Date	Opponent	Score	Win	Loss	Save	Attendance	Record
17	May 1	@ Reds	5–6	Elmer Riddle (1–3)	**Johnny Podgajny** (0–2)	None	805	4–13
18	May 2	@ Reds	3–4	Johnny Vander Meer (2–2)	**Cy Blanton** (0–4)	None	2,013	4–14
19	May 3 (1)	@ Cubs	1–9	Bill Lee (3–1)	**Tommy Hughes** (0–4)	None	see 2nd game	4–15
20	May 3 (2)	@ Cubs	8–1	**Rube Melton** (2–1)	Hi Bithorn (0–2)	None	19,980	5–15
21	May 5	@ Cubs	4–2	**Johnny Podgajny** (1–2)	Claude Passeau (2–3)	None	2,161	6–15
22	May 6	@ Cardinals	2–11	Mort Cooper (2–2)	**Si Johnson** (1–2)	None	789	6–16
–	May 7	@ Cardinals	Postponed (inclement weather); Makeup: June 13 as a traditional double-header					
23	May 9	@ Braves	2–6	Jim Tobin (4–3)	**Lefty Hoerst** (2–2)	None	3,828	6–17
24	May 10 (1)^{^{[a]}}	@ Braves	1–5	Al Javery (2–2)	**Rube Melton** (2–2)	None	see 2nd game	6–18
25	May 10 (2)^{^{[a]}}	@ Braves	4–3	**Tommy Hughes** (1–4)	Lefty Wallace (1–1)	None	20,657	7–18
26	May 11	@ Braves	2–3	Tom Earley (3–1)	**Johnny Podgajny** (1–3)	None	1,596	7–19
27	May 12	Cardinals	3–2	**Lefty Hoerst** (3–2)	Max Lanier (2–2)	None	2,000	8–19
28	May 13	Cardinals	1–9	Lon Warneke (2–2)	**Si Johnson** (1–3)	None	5,000	8–20
29	May 14	Cubs	3–5	Bill Lee (5–1)	**Rube Melton** (2–3)	None	2,000	8–21
30	May 15	Cubs	1–2	Claude Passeau (4–3)	**Tommy Hughes** (1–5)	None	1,500	8–22
–	May 16	Cubs	Postponed (inclement weather); Makeup: June 25					
31	May 17 (1)	Pirates	2–7	Luke Hamlin (2–1)	**Lefty Hoerst** (3–3)	None	see 2nd game	8–23
32	May 17 (2)	Pirates	5–4 (11)	**Rube Melton** (3–3)	Bob Klinger (2–1)	None	10,079	9–23
33	May 19	Pirates	5–4	**Johnny Podgajny** (2–3)	Max Butcher (4–3)	**Lefty Hoerst** (1)	3,366	10–23
34	May 20	Reds	3–10	Ray Starr (4–1)	**Tommy Hughes** (1–6)	None	1,145	10–24
35	May 21	Reds	3–2	**Si Johnson** (2–3)	Paul Derringer (0–2)	None	1,068	11–24
36	May 22	Braves	7–10	Lou Tost (3–2)	**Earl Naylor** (0–2)	Johnny Sain (2)	4,007	11–25
37	May 23	Braves	6–5	**Si Johnson** (3–3)	Manny Salvo (1–2)	None	1,663	12–25
38	May 24 (1)	Braves	3–2 (11)	**Sam Nahem** (1–0)	Jim Tobin (5–5)	None	see 2nd game	13–25
39	May 24 (2)	Braves	3–6	Dick Errickson (2–0)	**Earl Naylor** (0–3)	Johnny Sain (3)	10,965	13–26
40	May 25	@ Dodgers	0–3	Curt Davis (6–1)	**Lefty Hoerst** (3–4)	None	9,572	13–27
41	May 27	Giants	2–6	Bob Carpenter (4–2)	**Si Johnson** (3–4)	None	5,110	13–28
42	May 29	@ Braves	2–1	**Rube Melton** (4–3)	Dick Errickson (2–1)	None	2,078	14–28
43	May 30 (1)	@ Braves	1–10	Lou Tost (5–2)	**Johnny Podgajny** (2–4)	None	see 2nd game	14–29
44	May 30 (2)	@ Braves	3–4	Johnny Hutchings (1–0)	**Sam Nahem** (1–1)	Johnny Sain (4)	18,558	14–30
45	May 31 (1)	@ Giants	2–3	Bill Lohrman (3–2)	**Tommy Hughes** (1–7)	None	see 2nd game	14–31
46	May 31 (2)	@ Giants	1–7	Bob Carpenter (5–2)	**Lefty Hoerst** (3–5)	None	18,072	14–32

June (5–19)

#	Date	Opponent	Score	Win	Loss	Save	Attendance	Record
47	June 2	@ Reds	1–0 (10)	**Si Johnson** (4–4)	Elmer Riddle (1–6)	None	1,486	15–32
48	June 3	@ Reds	2–1 (10)	**Rube Melton** (5–3)	Paul Derringer (1–3)	None	11,047	16–32
49	June 5	@ Pirates	5–6	Ken Heintzelman (4–5)	**Lefty Hoerst** (3–6)	Dutch Dietz (1)	1,195	16–33
50	June 6	@ Pirates	1–3	Rip Sewell (5–5)	**Tommy Hughes** (1–8)	None	2,184	16–34
51	June 7 (1)	@ Pirates	4–5 (10)	Ken Heintzelman (5–5)	**Si Johnson** (4–5)	None	see 2nd game	16–35
52	June 7 (2)	@ Pirates	6–8 (7)^{^{[b]}}	Johnny Lanning (2–2)	**Rube Melton** (5–4)	Lefty Wilkie (1)	8,461	16–36
53	June 10	@ Cubs	2–5	Bill Lee (8–4)	**Johnny Podgajny** (2–5)	None	4,837	16–37
54	June 11	@ Cubs	1–7	Claude Passeau (9–3)	**Rube Melton** (5–5)	None	2,472	16–38
55	June 12	@ Cardinals	1–2	Mort Cooper (7–3)	**Tommy Hughes** (1–9)	None	6,866	16–39
–	June 13 (1)	@ Cardinals	Postponed (inclement weather); Makeup: July 15 as a traditional double-header					
–	June 13 (2)	@ Cardinals	Postponed (inclement weather); Makeup: August 28 as a traditional double-header					
56	June 14 (1)	@ Cardinals	1–9	Lon Warneke (5–2)	**Si Johnson** (4–6)	None	see 2nd game	16–40
57	June 14 (2)	@ Cardinals	5–6	Howie Krist (3–0)	**Sam Nahem** (1–2)	None	10,367	16–41
58	June 16	Pirates	5–1	**Johnny Podgajny** (3–5)	Luke Hamlin (2–3)	None	1,196	17–41
59	June 17	Pirates	1–6	Bob Klinger (4–1)	**Lefty Hoerst** (3–7)	None	3,804	17–42
60	June 19	Reds	4–6	Bucky Walters (7–5)	**Si Johnson** (4–7)	Joe Beggs (2)	6,074	17–43
61	June 20	Reds	0–7	Elmer Riddle (2–6)	**Rube Melton** (5–6)	None	1,570	17–44
62	June 21 (1)	Reds	3–2	**Tommy Hughes** (2–9)	Johnny Vander Meer (7–5)	None	see 2nd game	18–44
63	June 21 (2)	Reds	1–2	Ray Starr (10–2)	**Johnny Podgajny** (3–6)	None	8,114	18–45
64	June 23	Cubs	4–8	Vern Olsen (3–4)	**Lefty Hoerst** (3–8)	Bill Fleming (1)	1,520	18–46
65	June 24	Cubs	1–3	Claude Passeau (11–4)	**Earl Naylor** (0–4)	None	4,309	18–47
66	June 25	Cubs	1–7	Bill Lee (9–6)	**Johnny Podgajny** (3–7)	None	1,184	18–48
–	June 26	Cardinals	Postponed (inclement weather); Makeup: July 23					
–	June 27	Cardinals	Postponed (inclement weather); Makeup: September 14					
67	June 28 (1)	Cardinals	2–1 (15)	**Tommy Hughes** (3–9)	Howie Krist (3–1)	None	see 2nd game	19–48
68	June 28 (2)	Cardinals	1–3	Lon Warneke (6–3)	**Si Johnson** (4–8)	None	8,775	19–49
69	June 29	Dodgers	3–10	Ed Head (6–4)	**Rube Melton** (5–7)	Johnny Allen (3)	8,066	19–50
70	June 30	@ Giants	3–4	Cliff Melton (10–5)	**Johnny Podgajny** (3–8)	None	3,252	19–51

July (9–17)

#	Date	Opponent	Score	Win	Loss	Save	Attendance	Record
71	July 3	Dodgers	1–8^{^{[c]}}	Whit Wyatt (8–2)	**Lefty Hoerst** (3–9)	None	1,646	19–52
72	July 4 (1)	Dodgers	0–14	Kirby Higbe (8–4)	**Earl Naylor** (0–5)	None	see 2nd game	19–53
73	July 4 (2)	Dodgers	4–5	Johnny Allen (6–4)	**Ike Pearson** (0–2)	Hugh Casey (8)	15,574	19–54
74	July 5 (1)	Giants	3–2	**Tommy Hughes** (4–9)	Hal Schumacher (5–7)	None	see 2nd game	20–54
75	July 5 (2)	Giants	5–3	**Si Johnson** (5–8)	Tom Sunkel (2–3)	**Rube Melton** (1)	8,539	21–54
–	July 6	**1942 Major League Baseball All-Star Game at the Polo Grounds in New York**						
76	July 9	@ Pirates	0–9	Rip Sewell (9–7)	**Rube Melton** (5–8)	None	29,488	21–55
–	July 10	@ Pirates	Postponed (inclement weather); Makeup: September 3					
77	July 11	@ Pirates	5–12	Lefty Wilkie (4–4)	**Ike Pearson** (0–3)	None	2,034	21–56
78	July 12 (1)	@ Reds	0–2	Johnny Vander Meer (9–7)	**Tommy Hughes** (4–10)	None	see 2nd game	21–57
79	July 12 (2)	@ Reds	1–2	Elmer Riddle (3–6)	**Si Johnson** (5–9)	None	9,185	21–58
–	July 13	@ Reds	Postponed (inclement weather); Makeup: September 1					
80	July 14	@ Reds	2–1	**Rube Melton** (6–8)	Ray Starr (12–5)	None	1,375	22–58
81	July 15 (1)	@ Cardinals	3–7	Johnny Beazley (10–4)	**Lefty Hoerst** (3–10)	None	see 2nd game	22–59
82	July 15 (2)	@ Cardinals	4–9	Murry Dickson (3–1)	**Johnny Podgajny** (3–9)	None	10,602	22–60
83	July 16	@ Cardinals	4–3 (10)	**Tommy Hughes** (5–10)	Whitey Moore (0–1)	None	6,458	23–60
84	July 17	@ Cardinals	1–10	Howie Krist (6–1)	**Si Johnson** (5–10)	None	785	23–61
85	July 18	@ Cubs	1–2	Bill Lee (10–9)	**Rube Melton** (6–9)	Bill Fleming (2)	4,230	23–62
86	July 19 (1)	@ Cubs	8–5	**Johnny Podgajny** (4–9)	Lon Warneke (6–6)	**Tommy Hughes** (1)	see 2nd game	24–62
87	July 19 (2)	@ Cubs	4–8	Hi Bithorn (5–6)	**Boom-Boom Beck** (0–1)	None	16,682	24–63
88	July 21	Cardinals	1–6	Howie Krist (7–1)	**Tommy Hughes** (5–11)	None	5,271	24–64
89	July 22	Cardinals	0–7	Johnny Beazley (11–4)	**Si Johnson** (5–11)	None	2,290	24–65
90	July 23	Cardinals	4–3	**Rube Melton** (7–9)	Harry Gumbert (4–5)	None	3,881	25–65
–	July 24	Cubs	Postponed (inclement weather); Makeup: September 16 as a traditional double-header					
91	July 25	Cubs	1–4	Lon Warneke (7–6)	**Johnny Podgajny** (4–10)	None	4,513	25–66
92	July 26 (1)	Cubs	4–3	**Tommy Hughes** (6–11)	Bill Lee (10–10)	None	see 2nd game	26–66
93	July 26 (2)	Cubs	6–1	**Lefty Hoerst** (4–10)	Claude Passeau (14–8)	None	6,954	27–66
–	July 27	Reds	Postponed (inclement weather); Makeup: July 28 as a traditional double-header					
94	July 28 (1)	Reds	1–8	Johnny Vander Meer (10–8)	**Si Johnson** (5–12)	None	see 2nd game	27–67
95	July 28 (2)	Reds	1–3	Ray Starr (13–7)	**Rube Melton** (7–10)	None	2,789	27–68
–	July 29	Reds	Postponed (inclement weather); Makeup: July 30					
96	July 30	Reds	4–2	**Ike Pearson** (1–3)	Bucky Walters (12–8)	None	4,141	28–68
–	July 31	Pirates	Postponed (inclement weather); Makeup: September 9 as a traditional double-header					

August (8–20)

#	Date	Opponent	Score	Win	Loss	Save	Attendance	Record
97	August 1	Pirates	2–1 (12)	**Tommy Hughes** (7–11)	Rip Sewell (11–9)	None	1,595	29–68
98	August 2 (1)	Pirates	2–4	Luke Hamlin (3–4)	**Rube Melton** (7–11)	None	see 2nd game	29–69
99	August 2 (2)	Pirates	2–3	Dutch Dietz (4–4)	**Lefty Hoerst** (4–11)	Max Butcher (1)	7,794	29–70
100	August 4	Braves	4–2	**Si Johnson** (6–12)	Jim Tobin (9–15)	None	3,020	30–70
101	August 5	Braves	5–2	**Tommy Hughes** (8–11)	Tom Earley (4–9)	None	3,294	31–70
102	August 7	Giants	4–6	Carl Hubbell (7–6)	**Rube Melton** (7–12)	Ace Adams (7)	8,500	31–71
–	August 8	Giants	Postponed (inclement weather); Makeup: September 8					
103	August 9 (1)	Giants	2–3 (10)	Bill Lohrman (10–4)	**Johnny Podgajny** (4–11)	None	see 2nd game	31–72
104	August 9 (2)	Giants	0–2	Bill McGee (4–2)	**Tommy Hughes** (8–12)	None	3,081	31–73
105	August 10	@ Dodgers	0–6	Kirby Higbe (11–8)	**Lefty Hoerst** (4–12)	None	16,780	31–74
106	August 12	@ Dodgers	0–1	Larry French (12–1)	**Rube Melton** (7–13)	None	3,661	31–75
107	August 14	@ Giants	2–5	Carl Hubbell (8–6)	**Si Johnson** (6–13)	None	1,674	31–76
108	August 15 (1)	@ Giants	3–5	Ace Adams (4–3)	**Tommy Hughes** (8–13)	None	see 2nd game	31–77
109	August 15 (2)	@ Giants	3–4 (10)	Harry Feldman (3–1)	**Johnny Podgajny** (4–12)	None	9,816	31–78
110	August 16 (1)	@ Giants	5–6	Harry Feldman (4–1)	**Lefty Hoerst** (4–13)	None	14,955	31–79
–	August 16 (2)	@ Giants	Postponed (inclement weather, rain); Makeup: September 24 as a traditional double-header					
111	August 18	Dodgers	3–1	**Rube Melton** (8–13)	Max Macon (3–1)	None	7,560	32–79
112	August 22 (1)^{^{[d]}}	@ Braves	1–2 (10)	Jim Tobin (10–17)	**Tommy Hughes** (8–14)	None	see 2nd game	32–80
113	August 22 (2)^{^{[d]}}	@ Braves	5–3	**Si Johnson** (7–13)	Johnny Sain (4–6)	None	2,747	33–80
114	August 23 (1)^{^{[d]}}	@ Braves	1–3	Al Javery (11–13)	**Lefty Hoerst** (4–14)	None	see 2nd game	33–81
115	August 23 (2)^{^{[d]}}	@ Braves	2–0	**Rube Melton** (9–13)	Manny Salvo (6–6)	None	6,511	34–81
116	August 25	@ Cubs	6–4	**Johnny Podgajny** (5–12)	Bill Lee (13–12)	**Rube Melton** (2)	2,541	35–81
117	August 26 (1)^{^{[e]}}	@ Cubs	3–2 (11)	**Tommy Hughes** (9–14)	Hi Bithorn (7–11)	**Rube Melton** (3)	see 2nd game	36–81
118	August 26 (2)^{^{[e]}}	@ Cubs	0–3	Bill Fleming (4–5)	**Si Johnson** (7–14)	None	7,784	36–82
119	August 28 (1)	@ Cardinals	4–7	Harry Gumbert (7–5)	**Sam Nahem** (1–3)	None	see 2nd game	36–83
120	August 28 (2)	@ Cardinals	5–7	Howie Krist (11–3)	**Rube Melton** (9–14)	Ernie White (2)	1,914	36–84
121	August 29	@ Cardinals	2–5	Mort Cooper (17–7)	**Ike Pearson** (1–4)	None	1,865	36–85
122	August 30 (1)	@ Reds	0–2	Johnny Vander Meer (16–9)	**Tommy Hughes** (9–15)	None	see 2nd game	36–86
123	August 30 (2)	@ Reds	5–8	Ray Starr (14–12)	**Johnny Podgajny** (5–13)	Joe Beggs (8)	6,437	36–87
124	August 31	@ Reds	1–8	Elmer Riddle (6–9)	**Rube Melton** (9–15)	None	4,108	36–88

September (6–21)

#	Date	Opponent	Score	Win	Loss	Save	Attendance	Record
125	September 1	@ Reds	3–4 (11)	Joe Beggs (5–4)	**Si Johnson** (7–15)	None	1,030	36–89
126	September 2	@ Pirates	2–5	Dutch Dietz (6–6)	**Lefty Hoerst** (4–15)	None	3,712	36–90
–	September 3	@ Pirates	Postponed (inclement weather); Makeup: September 10 as a traditional double-header in Philadelphia					
127	September 6 (1)^{^{[e]}}	Braves	3–13	Tom Earley (5–11)	**Si Johnson** (7–16)	None	see 2nd game	36–91
128	September 6 (2)^{^{[e]}}	Braves	3–7	Manny Salvo (7–7)	**Lefty Hoerst** (4–16)	None	5,738	36–92
129	September 7 (1)	Giants	3–5	Bill Lohrman (13–4)	**Tommy Hughes** (9–16)	None	see 2nd game	36–93
130	September 7 (2)	Giants	0–4	Bob Carpenter (10–9)	**Rube Melton** (9–16)	None	5,290	36–94
–	September 8	Giants	Postponed (inclement weather); Makeup: September 25 as a traditional double-header in New York					
–	September 9 (1)	Pirates	Cancelled (inclement weather); Was not rescheduled					
–	September 9 (2)	Pirates	Cancelled (inclement weather); Was not rescheduled					
131	September 10 (1)	Pirates	2–1 (11)	**Tommy Hughes** (10–16)	Dutch Dietz (6–8)	None	not available	37–94
–	September 10 (2)	Pirates	Cancelled (inclement weather); Was not rescheduled					
132	September 11	Reds	5–8 (11)	Joe Beggs (6–4)	**Rube Melton** (9–17)	None	393	37–95
133	September 12	Reds	1–4	Elmer Riddle (7–10)	**Andy Lapihuska** (0–1)	None	1,017	37–96
134	September 13 (1)	Cardinals	2–1	**Tommy Hughes** (11–16)	Johnny Beazley (19–6)	None	see 2nd game	38–96
135	September 13 (2)	Cardinals	2–3	Bill Beckmann (1–1)	**Rube Melton** (9–18)	None	20,798	38–97
136	September 14	Cardinals	3–6	Howie Krist (13–3)	**Johnny Podgajny** (5–14)	None	2,550	38–98
137	September 15	Cardinals	2–3 (14)	Murry Dickson (6–3)	**Si Johnson** (7–17)	None	3,526	38–99
138	September 16 (1)	Cubs	3–1	**Johnny Podgajny** (6–14)	Claude Passeau (18–13)	None	see 2nd game	39–99
139	September 16 (2)	Cubs	1–4	Hi Bithorn (9–14)	**George Hennessey** (0–1)	None	1,287	39–100
140	September 17	Cubs	0–8	Hank Wyse (2–0)	**Andy Lapihuska** (0–2)	None	1,500	39–101
–	September 18	@ Dodgers	Postponed (inclement weather); Makeup: September 21					
141	September 19	@ Dodgers	4–5 (11)	Hugh Casey (6–3)	**Si Johnson** (7–18)	None	7,254	39–102
142	September 20 (1)	@ Dodgers	7–3	**Tommy Hughes** (12–16)	Whit Wyatt (18–7)	**Rube Melton** (4)	see 2nd game	40–102
143	September 20 (2)	@ Dodgers	2–4	Bobo Newsom (13–19)	**Ike Pearson** (1–5)	None	15,666	40–103
144	September 21	@ Dodgers	1–3	Kirby Higbe (15–11)	**Si Johnson** (7–19)	None	15,361	40–104
145	September 23	@ Dodgers	0–6	Larry French (14–4)	**Rube Melton** (9–19)	None	4,047	40–105
146	September 24 (1)	@ Giants	0–8	Bill Lohrman (14–5)	**Tommy Hughes** (12–17)	None	see 2nd game	40–106
147	September 24 (2)	@ Giants	3–2	**George Hennessey** (1–1)	Bill Voiselle (0–1)	None	3,066	41–106
148	September 25 (1)	@ Giants	3–6	Hal Schumacher (12–13)	**Ike Pearson** (1–6)	None	see 2nd game	41–107
149	September 25 (2)	@ Giants	9–1	**Si Johnson** (8–19)	Hank Leiber (0–1)	None	1,674	42–107
150	September 26	Dodgers	3–8	Larry French (15–4)	**Rube Melton** (9–20)	Hugh Casey (13)	2,874	42–108
151	September 27	Dodgers	3–4	Kirby Higbe (16–11)	**Tommy Hughes** (12–18)	Les Webber (1)	4,650	42–109

^{^[a]}The original schedule indicated single games on May 10 and August 21 at Boston; which became a double-header on May 10.
^{^[b]}The second game of a scheduled double-header on June 7, 1942, ended after seven innings due to the Pennsylvania Sunday curfew law with the score 6–8.
^{^[c]}The July 3, 1942, game was protested by the Phils in the top of the fifth inning. The protest was later denied.
^{^[d]}The original schedule indicated single games on August 22 and 23 and September 21 and 22 at Boston; which became double-headers on August 22 and 23.
^{^[e]}The original schedule indicated single games on August 26 and 27 at Chicago; which became a double-header on August 26.
^{^[f]}The original schedule indicated single games on September 5 and 6 with Boston; which became a double-header on September 6.

=== Roster ===
1942 Philadelphia Phils
**Roster**
**Pitchers**: 11,10 Boom-Boom Beck; 11 Cy Blanton; 16 Hilly Flitcraft; 14 George Hennessey; 14 Lefty Hoerst; 15,28 Tommy Hughes; 16,8 Si Johnson; 9 Gene Lambert; 6 Andy Lapihuska; 8 Paul Masterson; 17 Rube Melton; 18 Sam Nahem; 19 Ike Pearson; 20 Johnny Podgajny	**Catchers**: 25 Benny Culp; 6 Mickey Livingston; 12 Bill Peterman; 5 Bennie Warren; **Infielders**: 21 Bobby Bragan; 28 Bill Burich; 22 Nick Etten; 24 Al Glossop; 25 Bert Hodges; 7 Hal Marnie; 26 Pinky May; 33 Ed Murphy; 27 Danny Murtaugh	**Outfielders**: 30 Stan Benjamin; 30 Ed Freed; 12 Ernie Koy; 31,7 Danny Litwhiler; 32 Earl Naylor; 33 Ron Northey; 34 Lloyd Waner; **Other batters**: 3 Chuck Klein	**Manager**: 1 Hans Lobert; **Coaches**: 2 Bill Killefer; 3 Chuck Klein

== Player stats ==
= Indicates team leader

=== Batting ===
==== Starters by position ====
Note: Pos = Position; G = Games played; AB = At bats; H = Hits; Avg. = Batting average; HR = Home runs; RBI = Runs batted in

Pos	Player	G	AB	H	Avg.	HR	RBI
C	Mickey Livingston	89	239	49	.205	2	22
1B	Nick Etten	139	459	121	.264	8	41
2B	Al Glossop	121	454	102	.225	4	40
SS	Bobby Bragan	109	335	73	.218	2	15
3B	Pinky May	115	345	82	.238	0	18
OF	Ron Northey	127	402	101	.251	5	31
OF	Lloyd Waner	101	287	75	.261	0	10
OF	Danny Litwhiler	151	591	160	.271	9	56

==== Other batters ====
Note: G = Games played; AB = At bats; H = Hits; Avg. = Batting average; HR = Home runs; RBI = Runs batted in

Player	G	AB	H	Avg.	HR	RBI
Danny Murtaugh	144	506	122	.241	0	27
Ernie Koy	91	258	63	.244	4	26
Bennie Warren	90	225	47	.209	7	20
Stan Benjamin	78	210	47	.224	2	8
Earl Naylor	76	168	33	.196	0	14
Bill Burich	25	80	23	.288	0	7
Ed Freed	13	33	10	.303	0	1
Hal Marnie	24	30	5	.167	0	0
Ed Murphy	13	28	7	.250	0	4
Chuck Klein	14	14	1	.071	0	0
Bert Hodges	8	11	2	.182	0	0
Bill Peterman	1	1	1	1.000	0	0
Benny Culp	1	0	0	----	0	0

=== Pitching ===
==== Starting pitchers ====
Note: G = Games pitched; IP = Innings pitched; W = Wins; L = Losses; ERA = Earned run average; SO = Strikeouts

Player	G	IP	W	L	ERA	SO
Tommy Hughes	40	253.0	12	18	3.06	77
Rube Melton	42	209.1	9	20	3.70	107
Si Johnson	39	195.1	8	19	3.69	78
Lefty Hoerst	33	150.2	4	16	5.20	52

==== Other pitchers ====
Note: G = Games pitched; IP = Innings pitched; W = Wins; L = Losses; ERA = Earned run average; SO = Strikeouts

Player	G	IP	W	L	ERA	SO
Johnny Podgajny	43	186.2	6	14	3.91	40
Ike Pearson	35	85.1	1	6	4.54	21
Earl Naylor	20	60.1	0	5	6.12	19
Cy Blanton	6	22.1	0	4	5.64	16
Andy Lapihuska	3	20.2	0	2	5.23	8
George Hennessey	5	17.0	1	1	2.65	2

==== Relief pitchers ====
Note: G = Games pitched; W = Wins; L = Losses; SV = Saves; ERA = Earned run average; SO = Strikeouts

Player	G	W	L	SV	ERA	SO
Sam Nahem	35	1	3	0	4.94	38
Boom-Boom Beck	26	0	1	0	4.75	10
Paul Masterson	4	0	0	0	6.48	3
Hilly Flitcraft	3	0	0	0	8.10	1
Gene Lambert	1	0	0	0	9.00	1

== Farm system ==
Level	Team	League	Manager
B	Trenton Packers	Interstate League	Lefty Lloyd, John Casey and Tony Rensa
C	Rome Colonels	Canadian–American League	Bunny Griffiths and Philip Clark

== See also ==
- List of worst Major League Baseball season records
