= Guy Cantrell =

American baseball player (1904–1961)

- Pitcher
- Born: April 9, 1904; Clarita, Oklahoma, U.S.
- Died: January 31, 1961 (aged 56); McAlester, Oklahoma, U.S.
- Batted: Right Threw: Right

MLB debut
- August 18, 1925, for the Brooklyn Robins

Last MLB appearance
- September 28, 1930, for the Detroit Tigers

MLB statistics
- Win–loss record: 2–7
- Earned run average: 4.27
- Strikeouts: 45
- Stats at Baseball Reference

Teams
- Brooklyn Robins (1925, 1927); Philadelphia Athletics (1927); Detroit Tigers (1930)

Guy Dewey "Gump" Cantrell (April 9, 1904 – January 31, 1961) was an American pitcher in Major League Baseball. He pitched from 1925 to 1930.
