= Andy Rush =

American baseball player (1889-1969)

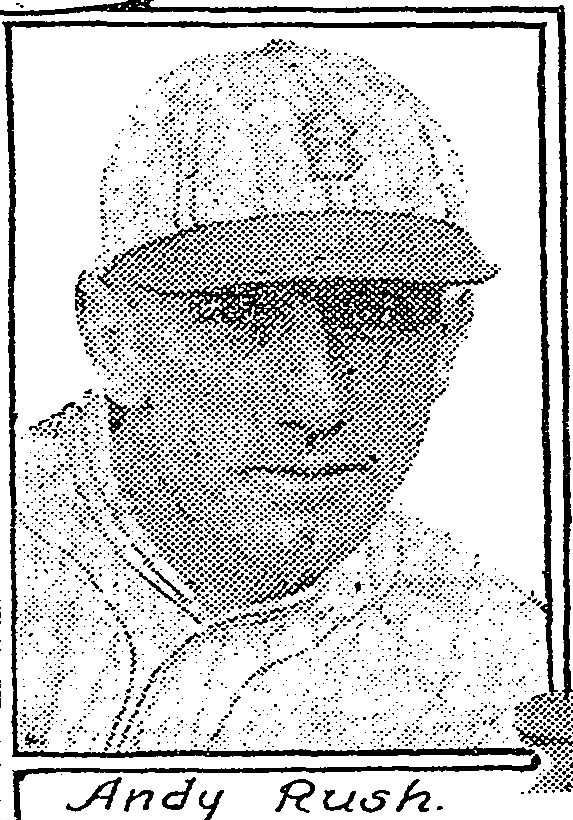
- Pitcher
- Born: December 26, 1889; Hartland, Kansas, U.S.
- Died: March 16, 1969 (aged 79); Fresno, California, U.S.
- Batted: Right Threw: Right

MLB debut
- April 16, 1925, for the Brooklyn Robins

Last MLB appearance
- May 15, 1925, for the Brooklyn Robins

MLB statistics
- Win–loss record: 0-1
- Earned run average: 9.31
- Strikeouts: 4
- Stats at Baseball Reference

Teams
- Brooklyn Robins (1925)

Jesse Howard Rush (December 26, 1889 – March 16, 1969) was an American pitcher in Major League Baseball. He pitched in four games for the Brooklyn Robins during the 1925 baseball season.
