= Hod Ford =

American baseball player (1897–1977)

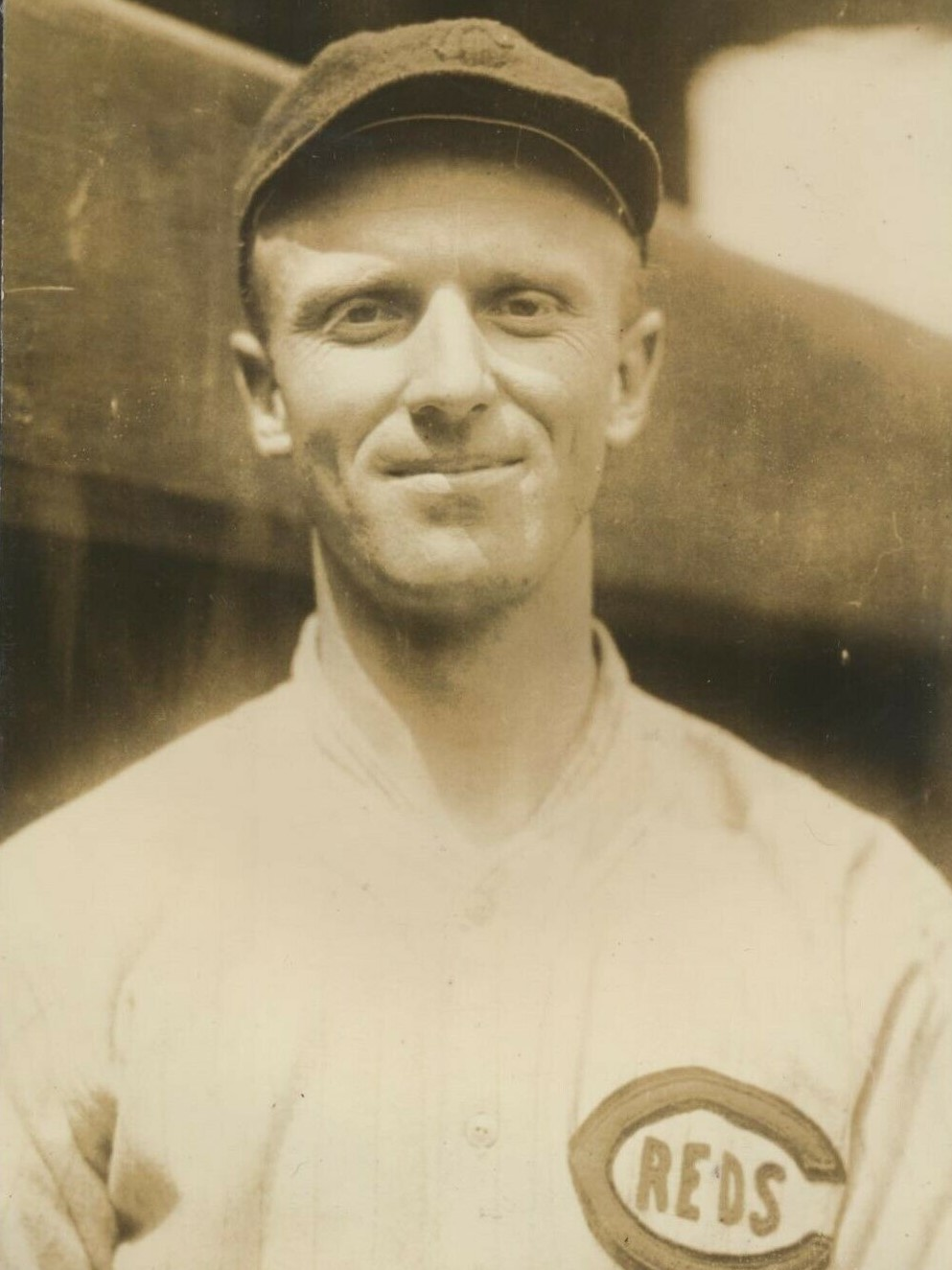
- Shortstop / Second baseman
- Born: July 23, 1897; New Haven, Connecticut, U.S.
- Died: January 29, 1977 (aged 79); Winchester, Massachusetts, U.S.
- Batted: Right Threw: Right

MLB debut
- September 8, 1919, for the Boston Braves

Last MLB appearance
- May 8, 1933, for the Boston Braves

MLB statistics
- Batting average: .263
- Home runs: 16
- Runs batted in: 494
- Stats at Baseball Reference

Teams
- Boston Braves (1919–1923); Philadelphia Phillies (1924); Brooklyn Robins (1925); Cincinnati Reds (1926–1931); St. Louis Cardinals (1932); Boston Braves (1932–1933)

Horace Hills "Hod" Ford (July 23, 1897 – January 29, 1977) was an American professional baseball second baseman and shortstop. He played in Major League Baseball (MLB) for the Boston Braves, Philadelphia Phillies, Brooklyn Robins, Cincinnati Reds, and St. Louis Cardinals between 1919 and 1933.

== Amateur career ==
A native of New Haven, Connecticut, Ford attended Somerville High School, where he played on the school's baseball team. He went on to attend Tufts University, where he studied mechanical engineering, and was considered by some as the "premier shortstop in college ball". While at Tufts in 1915 and 1916, he played shortstop for Falmouth in what is now the Cape Cod Baseball League. Ford was signed to a professional contract in 1919 while still a student, forgoing his senior year of college baseball eligibility. He graduated from Tufts University in 1919.

== Professional career ==
=== Boston Braves (1919–1923) ===
Ford made his major league debut in September 1919 for the Boston Braves, where he was a teammate of the legendary Jim Thorpe. Ford appeared in ten games for Boston that season, playing mainly at shortstop, where he backed up Hall of Famer Rabbit Maranville. By 1921, Ford had become a regular in the Braves' lineup, knocking 155 hits that season, and another 140 in 1922. After the 1923 season, Ford was traded by the Braves to the Philadelphia Phillies.

=== Philadelphia Phillies (1924), Brooklyn Robins (1925) ===
Ford hit .272 in 145 games for the Phillies during the 1924 season, and was selected off waivers by the Brooklyn Robins early in the 1925 season. At Brooklyn, Ford played alongside Hall of Famers Burleigh Grimes, Dazzy Vance, and Zack Wheat, but the team floundered and finished the season in a virtual three-way tie for last place in the National League.

=== Cincinnati Reds (1926–1931) ===
With the Cincinnati Reds, Ford and second baseman Hughie Critz formed a stellar double play combination that was responsible for the majority of the 1928 Reds' whopping 194 twin-killings. Ford batted a pedestrian .241 that season, but his defensive prowess accounted for his finishing 22nd in the 1928 National League MVP voting.

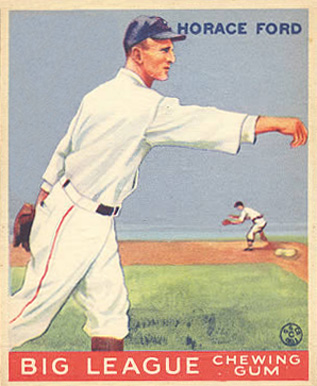
Ford's 1933 Goudey baseball card

=== St. Louis Cardinals (1932), Boston Braves (1932–1933) ===
Prior to the 1932 season, Ford's contract was purchased from the Reds by the St. Louis Cardinals, but the Cards released him in April, after appearing in only a single game for the team. Ford signed as a free agent with his old team, the Boston Braves, and went on to bat .274 in 40 games for Boston during the remainder of the 1932 season. After starting the 1933 season with only one hit in his first 15 at bats for the Braves, Ford was released.

=== Career totals ===
In fifteen major league seasons, Ford hit .263 with 1,269 hits, 351 walks, and 494 RBI in 1,446 games. He never played on a pennant-winning team; the closest he came to a pennant was with the second-place 1926 Reds. He played all but nine career games at either shortstop or second base, and committed 273 errors in 8,124 chances, for a .966 fielding percentage.

== Later years ==
While still an active major leaguer, Ford and his uncle Benjamin Hills opened an ice cream shop in Winchester, Massachusetts. After his playing career ended, Ford continued in the business. He died in Winchester in 1977 at age 79.
