= Al Glossop =

American baseball player (1914–1991)

- Second baseman
- Born: July 12, 1914; Christopher, Illinois, U.S.
- Died: July 2, 1991 (aged 76); Walnut Creek, California, U.S.
- Batted: Switch Threw: Right

MLB debut
- September 23, 1939, for the New York Giants

Last MLB appearance
- May 5, 1946, for the Chicago Cubs

MLB statistics
- Batting average: .209
- Home runs: 15
- Runs scored: 86
- Stats at Baseball Reference

Teams
- New York Giants (1939–1940); Boston Bees (1940); Philadelphia Phillies (1942); Brooklyn Dodgers (1943); Chicago Cubs (1946)

Alban Glossop (July 12, 1914 – July 2, 1991) was an American professional baseball infielder. The native of Christopher, Illinois, had a 17-year career, including 309 games in Major League Baseball over all or parts of five seasons (1939–1940, 1942–1943 and 1946) as a member of the New York Giants, Boston Bees, Philadelphia Phillies, Brooklyn Dodgers and Chicago Cubs, all of the National League. He was a switch hitter who threw right-handed, and was listed as 6 feet (1.8 m) tall and 170 pounds (77 kg).

Glossop attended Belleville High School. His baseball career extended from 1932 through 1950, less two seasons of World War II service in the United States Navy in the Pacific Theatre in 1944 and 1945. In the major leagues, he was primarily a second baseman, getting into 195 games, with 37 games as a third baseman and 36 as a shortstop. Glossop was the 1942 Phillies' starting second baseman. Altogether, he batted .209 in the big leagues, with his 199 hits including 29 doubles, two triples, and 15 home runs. He was credited with 86 runs batted in.

Glossop died at age 76 in Walnut Creek, California.
