= Bob Barrett (baseball) =

American baseball player (1899–1982)

- Third baseman
- Born: January 27, 1899; Atlanta, Georgia, U.S.
- Died: January 18, 1982 (aged 82); Atlanta, Georgia, U.S.
- Batted: Right Threw: Right

MLB debut
- April 30, 1923, for the Chicago Cubs

Last MLB appearance
- August 1, 1929, for the Boston Red Sox

MLB statistics
- Batting average: .260
- Home runs: 10
- Runs batted in: 86
- Stats at Baseball Reference

Teams
- Chicago Cubs (1923–1925); Brooklyn Robins (1925, 1927); Boston Red Sox (1929)

Robert Schley Barrett, Sr. (January 27, 1899 in Atlanta – January 18, 1982 in Atlanta, Georgia) was an American third baseman in Major League Baseball.

== Early life and education ==
Robert Schley Barrett was one of seven children born to Robert Pittman Barrett and Lenora Jett Barrett in Atlanta, Georgia. He attended English Avenue Elementary School and Boys High School, finishing his education after the tenth grade.

== Career ==
In 239 games over five seasons, Barrett posted a .260 batting average (169-for-650) with 10 home runs and 86 RBIs.

== Personal life ==
Robert Barrett married the former Ruby Irene Brewer on February 13, 1924. He had at least two children, Robert Schley Barrett, Jr. (1927–1982) and Betty Marlene "Betts" Barrett (1934–2015). He became a steamfitter after his retirement from baseball, and died at the age of 82 in Atlanta. He had one granddaughter, Terri Lynn Barrett.

== Sources ==
- Career statistics from Baseball Reference · Baseball Reference (Minors) · Retrosheet · Baseball Almanac
