= Roy Hutson =

American baseball player

- Outfielder
- Born: February 27, 1902; Luray, Missouri, U.S.
- Died: May 20, 1957 (aged 55); La Mesa, California, U.S.
- Batted: Left Threw: Right

MLB debut
- September 20, 1925, for the Brooklyn Robins

Last MLB appearance
- October 1, 1925, for the Brooklyn Robins

MLB statistics
- Batting average: .500
- Home runs: 0
- Runs batted in: 1
- Stats at Baseball Reference

Teams
- Brooklyn Robins (1925)

Roy Lee Hutson (February 27, 1902 – May 20, 1957) played one year of Major League Baseball as an outfielder with the Brooklyn Robins in 1925. He played 7 games and had a .500 batting average.

== Sources ==
- Career statistics from Baseball Reference · Baseball Reference (Minors) · Retrosheet · Baseball Almanac
