= Hilly Flitcraft =

American baseball player (1923-2003)

- Pitcher
- Born: August 21, 1923; Woodstown, New Jersey, U.S.
- Died: April 2, 2003 (aged 79); Boulder, Colorado, U.S.
- Batted: Left Threw: Left

MLB debut
- August 31, 1942, for the Philadelphia Phillies

Last MLB appearance
- September 17, 1942, for the Philadelphia Phillies

MLB statistics
- Win–loss record: 0–0
- Earned run average: 8.10
- Strikeouts: 1
- Games played: 3
- Stats at Baseball Reference

Teams
- Philadelphia Phillies (1942)

Hildreth Milton "Hilly" Flitcraft (August 21, 1923 – April 2, 2003) was an American Major League Baseball pitcher. Flitcraft played for the Philadelphia Phillies in the 1942 season. In 3 career games, he had a 0–0 record with an 8.10 ERA. He batted and threw left-handed.

Following the 1942 season, Flitcraft voluntarily retired from baseball in order to tend to the family dairy farm during World War II. He, however, took himself off the retirement list in 1945 and took part in training among farm team members due to the war travel restrictions. While playing for Wilmington, the 1945 season was his best as a pro baller as he was selected in the all-star team.

Flitcraft was born in Woodstown, New Jersey, and died in Boulder, Colorado.

Hildreth Milton Flitcraft is referenced in Allen Woods' 2017 Formulas of the Moral Law as a seemingly random or stand-in name. The reference is found in footnote 7, and is used within the context of a maxim: “Make a false promise on a Tuesday to a person named Hildreth Milton Flitcraft”.
