= Rube Melton =

American baseball player (1917–1971)

- Pitcher
- Born: February 27, 1917; Cramerton, North Carolina, U.S.
- Died: September 11, 1971 (aged 54); Greer, South Carolina, U.S.
- Batted: Right Threw: Right

MLB debut
- April 17, 1941, for the Philadelphia Phillies

Last MLB appearance
- June 3, 1947, for the Brooklyn Dodgers

MLB statistics
- Win–loss record: 30–50
- Earned run average: 3.62
- Strikeouts: 363
- Stats at Baseball Reference

Teams
- Philadelphia Phillies (1941–1942); Brooklyn Dodgers (1943–1944, 1946–1947)

Reuben Franklin Melton (February 27, 1917 – September 11, 1971) was an American professional baseball pitcher, who played in Major League Baseball (MLB) for the Philadelphia Phillies and Brooklyn Dodgers, from 1941 to 1947.

Melton experienced difficulty in his first MLB season when he was suspended by the Phillies for leaving the team without permission reportedly because of homesickness. Melton led the league in walks and wild pitches during the 1942 season.

Melton was traded to Brooklyn, on December 12, 1942, for pitcher Johnny Allen and $30,000. (The Dodgers had previously tried to trade for Melton, but Commissioner of Baseball Judge Kenesaw Mountain Landis disallowed the transaction; however, because of Philadelphia’s ever-increasing financial instability, the second deal was approved.)

Melton missed the 1945 season due to service in the US Army during World War II. His best season occurred just after his military discharge in May 1946, when Melton went 6–3 with a 1.99 earned run average (ERA) for the Dodgers. An earlier arm injury forced him to shorten his major league career. Melton continued to make comeback attempts through 1951, in the minor leagues, then retired as an active player.

Melton's playing career overlapped that of his cousin, Cliff Melton, who pitched for the New York Giants.

On September 12, 1971, Melton died in an automobile accident in Greer, South Carolina.
