= Tommy Hughes (baseball) =

American baseball player (1919–1990)

- Pitcher
- Born: October 7, 1919; Wilkes-Barre, Pennsylvania, U.S.
- Died: November 28, 1990 (aged 71); Wilkes-Barre, Pennsylvania, U.S.
- Batted: Right Threw: Right

MLB debut
- April 19, 1941, for the Philadelphia Phillies

Last MLB appearance
- July 19, 1948, for the Cincinnati Reds

MLB statistics
- Win–loss record: 31–56
- Earned run average: 3.92
- Strikeouts: 221
- Stats at Baseball Reference

Teams
- Philadelphia Phillies (1941–1942; 1946–1947); Cincinnati Reds (1948)

Thomas Owen Hughes (October 7, 1919 – November 28, 1990) was an American professional baseball player. Born in Wilkes-Barre, Pennsylvania, he was a right-handed pitcher who appeared in 144 games pitched in the Major Leagues from 1941–42 and 1946–48 for the Philadelphia Phillies and Cincinnati Reds. Hughes stood 6 feet 1 inch (1.85 m) tall and weighed 190 pounds (86 kg).

During his rookie season, on June 3, 1941, Hughes threw a one-hit, 7–0 shutout against the Chicago Cubs, with Lou Novikoff getting the only safety. But his best season came in 1942, when he appeared in 40 games, 31 as a starting pitcher, and set a career high in wins (12) and innings pitched (253), and notched a low 3.06 earned run average. However, with a last-place Phillies team behind him, he lost 18 games, also a career high. Hughes then spent three full seasons (1943–1945) in the United States Army during World War II.

Pitching for second-division National League teams that never won more than 65 games in any of his five seasons, Hughes never recorded a .500 winning percentage in the Majors. In 144 games, 87 as a starter, and 688 innings pitched, he gave up 698 hits and 308 bases on balls, with 221 strikeouts, 31 complete games, and five shutouts.

== Pro career ==
Hughes made his pro debut for the old Baltimore Orioles of the International League. Playing under the legendary Rogers Hornsby, Hughes did not earn a win and finished 0-2 after appearing in seven games at the age of nineteen. That season he also played for Dover of the Eastern Shore League. Playing on the D-League level, Hughes went 9-0 with a 1.80 ERA. The next season, he played the entire year with Baltimore, finishing with a 14-11 record. The next season he made the Orioles parent club, the Philadelphia Phillies. In his rookie season, Hughes went 9-14 with a 4.45 ERA. He earned his first major league victory on April 22, 1941. Coming in relief for starter Si Johnson, who'd pitched 11 innings, Hughes walked two batters and gave up one hit, and struck out one in just one inning of work. Hughes struggle a bit in his rookie season. He finished with nine wins, fourteen losses and an E.R.A. of 4.45. He bounced back with a strong outing in 1942. Hughes went 12-18, despite not recording his first win until May 10, a 4-3 win over the Boston Braves in which Hughes went the distance, giving up three runs on six hits in nine innings. It would be a month, June 16 to be exact, before Hughes earned his next win, a 3-2 win over the Cincinnati Reds, as Hughes out dueled Reds ace Johnny Vander Meer.

Hughes missed the next three seasons serving in the military during World War II, as did many major leaguers. In 1946, Hughes appeared in 29 games for the Phillies. Once again, Hughes lost his first several decisions before picking up his first win in June to put him at 1-6. When the season was over, Hughes was 6-9. In 1947, the pattern repeated for Hughes, losing his first several decisions, though he did earn a save in Philadelphia's 8-4 win over Cincinnati. On July 14, Hughes earned his final win as a member of the Philles, a 5-2 win over the St. Louis Cardinals. Hughes went the distance, pitching all nine innings, giving up only six hits, and holding Cardinals stars like Enos Slaughter and Marty Marion hitless. Hughes struck out three and gave up a home run to Cardinals third baseman Whitey Kurowski

At the end of the 1947 season, the Phillies traded Hughes to the Cincinnari reds for journeyman utility player Bert Haas. Hughes' time in Cincinnati saw him not only go 0-4, but the Reds were 0-12 in games in which Hughes appeared. Hughes made his last major league appearance on July 14, 1948. He worked one inning and gave up five hits and allowed four runs. Starter Ken Peterson, who only last two innings, gave up five runs, as did Walker Cress, who relieved Hughes after Hughes' one inning of work. The Giants crushed the Reds 14-2.

In 1948, Hughes also pitched for the Syracuse Chiefs, the triple A affiliate of the Reds. He spent all of 1949 pitching for the Tulsa Oilers of the Texas League. Hughes was not re-signed by the Reds at the end of the year, ending his career as a baseball player.

== Military service and post-baseball life ==
Hughes enlisted in the military on December 19, 1942. During his military career, Hughes served as a Private, First Class (PFC for short). Based at the New Cumberland Reception Center, Hughes played for the camp's baseball team. he was the teams ace, earning wins over the stronger military teams. By the end of the season, Hughes was 14-3. He was assigned to Camp Siebert, located in Alabama. While stationed there, Hughes pitched for the military baseball team. In 1945, he was assigned to Camp Patrick Henry, located in Virginia. While keeping up with his military duties, Hughes found time to play for that camp's baseball squad as well.

After his military service and baseball career were both over, Hughes returned home. He served as the director of baseball fields for the city of Wilkes-Barre. In 1953, he was a coach for the Eastern league's Wilkes-Barre Barons. He was active for a few games, but did not appear in any of them.
