= Andy Lapihuska =

American baseball player (1922-1996)

- Pitcher
- Born: November 1, 1922; Delmont, New Jersey, U.S.
- Died: February 17, 1996 (aged 73); Millville, New Jersey, U.S.
- Batted: Left Threw: Right

MLB debut
- September 12, 1942, for the Philadelphia Phillies

Last MLB appearance
- May 5, 1943, for the Philadelphia Phillies

MLB statistics
- Win–loss record: 0–2
- Earned run average: 7.04
- Strikeouts: 8
- Stats at Baseball Reference

Teams
- Philadelphia Phillies (1942–1943)

Andrew Lapihuska (November 1, 1922 – February 17, 1996) was an American professional baseball player. He was a right-handed pitcher over parts of two seasons (1942–43) with the Philadelphia Phillies. For his career, he compiled an 0–2 record, with a 7.04 earned run average, and 8 strikeouts in 23 innings pitched.

Lapihuska was born in the Delmont section of Maurice River Township, New Jersey, and attended Millville High School. He died in Millville, New Jersey, at the age of 73.
