= Bill Peterman =

American baseball player (1921-1999)

- Catcher
- Born: March 20, 1921; Philadelphia, Pennsylvania, U.S.
- Died: March 13, 1999 (aged 77); Philadelphia, Pennsylvania, U.S.
- Batted: Right Threw: Right

MLB debut
- April 26, 1942, for the Philadelphia Phillies

Last MLB appearance
- April 26, 1942, for the Philadelphia Phillies

MLB statistics
- At bats: 1
- Hits: 1
- Batting average: 1.000

Teams
- Philadelphia Phillies (1942)

William David Peterman (March 20, 1921 – March 13, 1999) was an American Major League Baseball catcher. Peterman played for the Philadelphia Phillies in the 1942 season. In 1 career game, he had 1 hit in 1 at-bat, having a 1.000 career batting average. He batted and threw right-handed.

Peterman was born and died in Philadelphia, Pennsylvania.
