= Earl Naylor =

American baseball player (1919–1990)

- Outfielder / Pitcher
- Born: May 19, 1919; Kansas City, Missouri, U.S.
- Died: January 16, 1990 (aged 70); Winter Haven, Florida, U.S.
- Batted: Right Threw: Right

MLB debut
- April 15, 1942, for the Philadelphia Phillies

Last MLB appearance
- May 14, 1946, for the Brooklyn Dodgers

MLB statistics
- Batting average: .186
- Home runs: 3
- Runs batted in: 28
- Win–loss record: 0–5
- Earned run average: 6.12
- Strikeouts: 19
- Stats at Baseball Reference

Teams
- Philadelphia Phillies (1942–1943); Brooklyn Dodgers (1946)

Earl Eugene Naylor (May 19, 1919 – January 16, 1990) was an American outfielder and pitcher in Major League Baseball for the Brooklyn Dodgers and Philadelphia Phillies. He played from 1942 to 1946. From 1944 to 1945 Naylor served in the United States Navy during World War II.

Naylor became a manager in the minor leagues at the end of his career, for the Union City Dodgers of the KITTY League in 1953 and 1954 and the Asheville Tourists of the Tri-State League in 1955.
