= Bill Hubbell =

American baseball player (1897-1980)

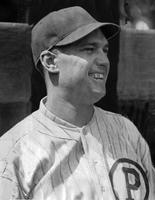
- Pitcher
- Born: June 17, 1897; San Francisco, California, U.S.
- Died: August 3, 1980 (aged 83); Lakewood, Colorado, U.S.
- Batted: Right Threw: Right

MLB debut
- September 24, 1919, for the New York Giants

Last MLB appearance
- September 13, 1925, for the Brooklyn Robins

MLB statistics
- Win–loss record: 40–63
- Earned run average: 4.68
- Strikeouts: 167
- Stats at Baseball Reference

Teams
- New York Giants (1919–1920); Philadelphia Phillies (1920–1925); Brooklyn Robins (1925)

Wilbert William Hubbell (born June 17, 1897 – August 3, 1980) was an American professional baseball pitcher. He played in Major League Baseball from 1919 to 1925.

== Early life ==
Hubbell was born in San Francisco, California. He attended college at the University of Idaho.

== Career ==
Hubbell appeared in 204 Major League Baseball games between 1919 and 1925 for three NL clubs, principally the Philadelphia Phillies.

== Injury ==
While playing for the Philadelphia Phillies, Hubbell was hit in the head by a line drive on May 25, 1922, which fractured his skull. A newspaper article at the time wrote, "In the Brooklyn half of the first inning in the first game of a double header at the Philadelphia National League Park a line drive from Tom Griffith's bat struck pitcher Wilbur Hubbell the Philadelphia pitcher, who did not have time to get out of the ball's way. The sphere hit him on the left side of the head and he dropped to the ground..."

He was out of the hospital on June 3, 1922, almost completely recovered from the injury. Newspaper reports at the time said he would wear "a specially constructed steel plate to guard the area over his right ear" against further injuries.

== Death ==
Hubbell died at the age of 83 in Lakewood, Colorado.
