= Tommy Griffith =

American baseball player (1889–1967)

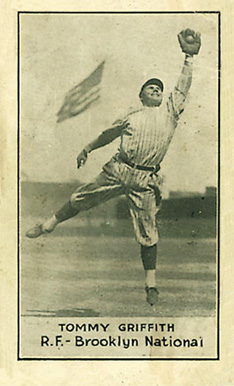
- Outfielder
- Born: October 26, 1889; Prospect, Ohio, U.S.
- Died: April 13, 1967 (aged 77); Cincinnati, Ohio, U.S.
- Batted: Left Threw: Right

MLB debut
- August 25, 1913, for the Boston Braves

Last MLB appearance
- September 22, 1925, for the Chicago Cubs

MLB statistics
- Batting average: .280
- Home runs: 52
- Runs batted in: 619
- Stats at Baseball Reference

Teams
- Boston Braves (1913–1914); Cincinnati Reds (1915–1918); Brooklyn Robins (1919–1925); Chicago Cubs (1925)

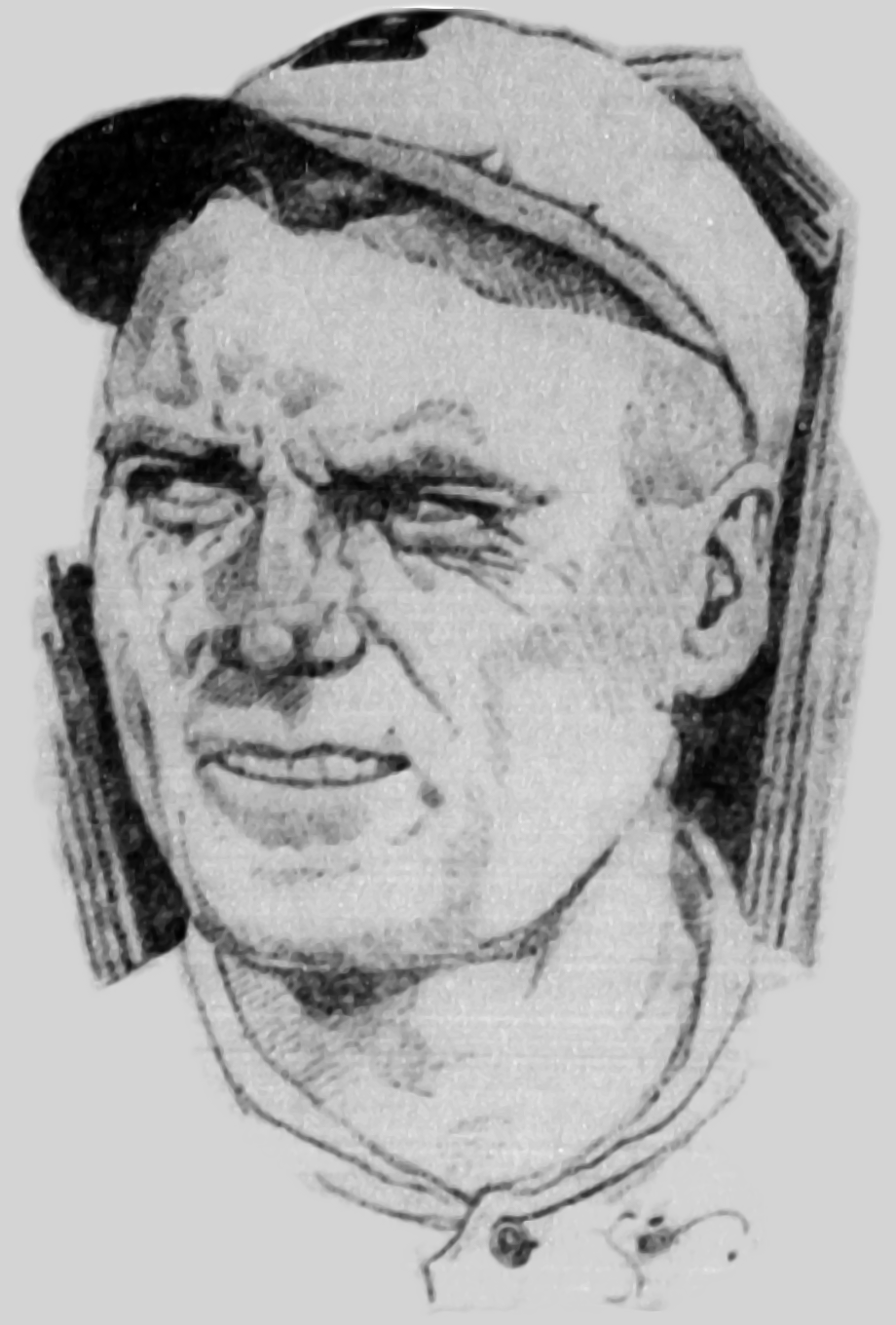
Griffith c. 1921

Thomas Herman Griffith (October 26, 1889 – April 13, 1967) was an American professional baseball player from 1913 to 1925. He was a right fielder who mainly played with the Cincinnati Reds and Brooklyn Robins. While with these teams he never hit below .250 and had over 100 hits in a season eight times.

Griffith, who was born in Prospect, Ohio, also played briefly for the Boston Braves and Chicago Cubs.

In 1401 games played, Griffith recorded a .280 batting average (1383–4947) with 589 runs, 52 home runs and 619 RBI over a 13-year major-league career. His on-base percentage was .328 and slugging percentage was .382. He appeared in the 1920 World Series, batting .190 (4-21) with one run scored and three RBI for the Brooklyn Robins. Griffith achieved three 5-hit games in his MLB career, all as a member of the Robins and surpassed the .300 batting mark three times. His career fielding percentage as an outfielder was .956.

He died in Cincinnati, Ohio.
