= Ed Murphy (first baseman) =

American baseball player (1918-1991)

- First baseman
- Born: August 23, 1918; Joliet, Illinois, U.S.
- Died: December 10, 1991 (aged 73); Joliet, Illinois, U.S.
- Batted: Right Threw: Right

MLB debut
- September 10, 1942, for the Philadelphia Phillies

Last MLB appearance
- September 27, 1942, for the Philadelphia Phillies

MLB statistics
- Batting average: .250
- Home runs: 0
- Runs batted in: 4
- Stats at Baseball Reference

Teams
- Philadelphia Phillies (1942)

Edward Joseph Murphy (August 23, 1918 – December 10, 1991) was an American Major League Baseball first baseman who played for the Philadelphia Phillies during the 1942 season.
