= Manny Salvo =

American baseball player (1912-1997)

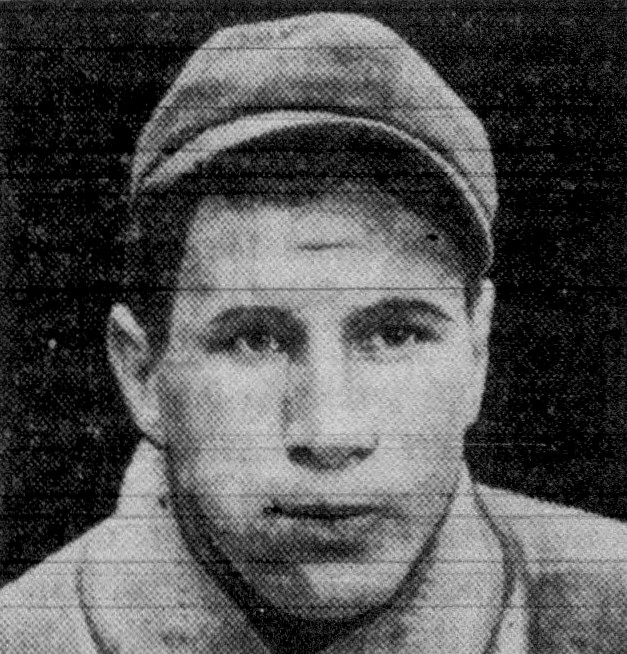
- Salvo, circa 1942
- Pitcher
- Born: June 30, 1912; Sacramento, California, U.S.
- Died: February 7, 1997 (aged 84); Vallejo, California, U.S.
- Batted: Right Threw: Right

MLB debut
- April 22, 1939, for the New York Giants

Last MLB appearance
- October 3, 1943, for the Boston Braves

MLB statistics
- Win–loss record: 33–50
- Earned run average: 3.69
- Strikeouts: 247
- Stats at Baseball Reference

Teams
- New York Giants (1939); Boston Bees / Braves (1940–1943); Philadelphia Phillies (1943); Boston Braves (1943)

Manuel Salvo (June 30, 1912 – February 7, 1997) was a Major League Baseball pitcher. The 6 ft 4 in (1.93 m), 210 lb (95 kg) right-hander played for the New York Giants (1939), Boston Bees / Braves (1940–43), and Philadelphia Phillies (1943). His nickname was "Gyp", short for "Gypsy".

A native of Sacramento, California, Salvo had his best season statistically in 1940 with the Bees. He won 10, lost 9, making it the only season of his career in which he finished with more wins than losses. He also shared the National League lead with 5 shutouts, and ranked eighth in the league with a 3.08 earned run average.

While Salvo had a poor win–loss record, his career Adjusted ERA+ was only slightly below average at 98. He only pitched for one winning team, the 1939 Giants, and at 77–74 they were barely over the .500 mark.

Salvo died at the age of 83 in Vallejo, California.
