= Bert Humphries =

American baseball player (1880–1945)

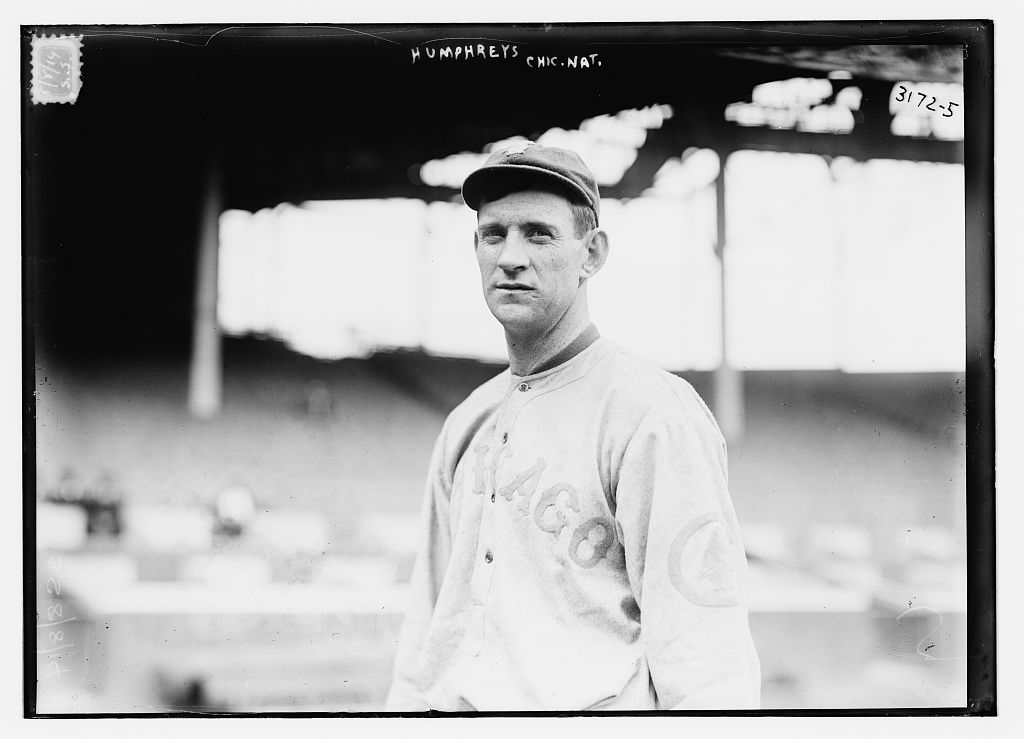
- Pitcher
- Born: September 26, 1880; California, Pennsylvania, U.S.
- Died: September 21, 1945 (aged 64); Orlando, Florida, U.S.
- Batted: Right Threw: Right

MLB debut
- April 16, 1910, for the Philadelphia Phillies

Last MLB appearance
- October 2, 1915, for the Chicago Cubs

MLB statistics
- Win–loss record: 50–43
- Earned run average: 2.79
- Strikeouts: 258
- Stats at Baseball Reference

Teams
- Philadelphia Phillies (1910–1911); Cincinnati Reds (1911–1912); Chicago Cubs (1913–1915)

Albert Humphries (September 26, 1880 – September 21, 1945) was an American professional baseball player who played pitcher in the Major Leagues from 1910 to 1915. He would play for the Cincinnati Reds, Chicago Cubs, and Philadelphia Phillies.
