= Harry Huston =

American baseball player and football coach (1883-1969)

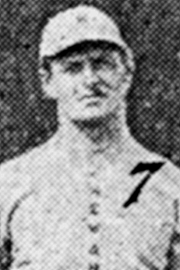

Biographical details
- Born: October 14, 1883; Bellefontaine, Ohio, U.S.
- Died: October 13, 1969 (aged 85); Blackwell, Oklahoma, U.S.
- Education: Southwestern College

Coaching career (HC unless noted)

Football
- 1904: Southwestern

Head coaching record
- Overall: 3–4

Harry Emanuel Kress Huston (October 14, 1883 – October 16, 1969) was an American professional baseball player and college football coach.

== Baseball career ==
=== University of Kansas ===
Huston played for the University of Kansas baseball team in Lawrence, Kansas from 1902 until 1906.

=== Philadelphia Phillies ===
Harry Huston
- Catcher
- Born: October 2, 1883; Bellefontaine, Ohio
- Died: October 13, 1969 (aged 85); Blackwell, Oklahoma
- Batted: Right Threw: Right

MLB debut
- September 3, 1906, for the Philadelphia Phillies

Last MLB appearance
- September 19, 1906, for the Philadelphia Phillies

MLB statistics
- Batting average: .000
- Games played: 2
- At bats: 4
- Stats at Baseball Reference

Teams
- Philadelphia Phillies (1906)

Huston made his major league debut as a catcher with the Philadelphia Phillies on September 3, 1906, and played his final major league game on September 19, 1906. His teammates included Hall of Fame members Hugh Duffy and Kid Nichols. His short professional career consisted of four at bats, no hits, and one base on balls. He continued to pursue his baseball career in the minor leagues and he had previously played professionally under an assumed name of "Corbin" so he could continue to play in college as well.

== Coaching career ==
Huston was the second football coach at Southwestern College in Winfield, Kansas and held that position for one year, coaching the 1905 season. His coaching record at Southwesterns was 3–4.

== Head coaching record ==
Year	Team	Overall	Conference	Standing	Bowl/playoffs
Southwestern Moundbuilders (Independent) (1905)
1905	Southwestern	3–4			
Southwestern:		3–4			
Total:		3–4			
