= Si Johnson =

American baseball player (1906–1994)

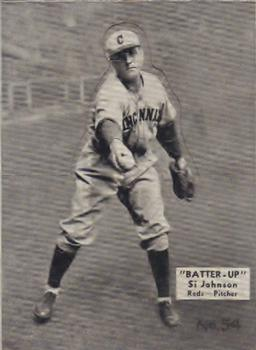
- Pitcher
- Born: October 5, 1906; Danway, Illinois, U.S.
- Died: May 12, 1994 (aged 87); Sheridan, Illinois, U.S.
- Batted: Right Threw: Right

MLB debut
- September 11, 1928, for the Cincinnati Reds

Last MLB appearance
- September 25, 1947, for the Boston Braves

MLB statistics
- Win–loss record: 101–165
- Earned run average: 4.09
- Strikeouts: 840
- Stats at Baseball Reference

Teams
- Cincinnati Reds (1928–1936); St. Louis Cardinals (1936–1938); Philadelphia Phillies (1940–1943; 1946); Boston Braves (1946–1947)

Silas Kenneth Johnson (October 5, 1906 – May 12, 1994) was an American professional baseball player, a right-handed pitcher who appeared in 492 Major League games pitched over 17 seasons for the Cincinnati Reds (1928–36), St. Louis Cardinals (1936–38), Philadelphia Phillies (1940–43; 1946) and Boston Braves (1946–47). He was born in Danway, near Ottawa, Illinois, and was listed as 5 feet 11 inches (1.80 m) tall and 185 pounds (84 kg).

Johnson led the National League in losses in 1931 (19) and 1934 (22). He also led the National League in earned runs allowed (125) in 1934.

Missing the 1944–45 baseball seasons, Johnson served with the US Navy during World War II.

In 17 seasons Johnson had a 101–165 win–loss record, 492 games, 272 games started, 108 complete games, 13 shutouts, 115 games finished, 15 saves, 2,281 1/3 innings pitched, 2,510 hits allowed, 1,226 runs allowed, 1,036 earned runs allowed, 120 home runs allowed, 687 walks allowed, 840 strikeouts, 36 hit batsmen, 26 wild pitches, 9,903 batters faced, 3 balks and a 4.09 ERA.

Johnson remained in baseball for two seasons after his active career ended, serving as batting practice pitcher and then pitching coach of the Braves (1948–49); he was a member of Boston's 1948 National League champions. He died in Sheridan, Illinois at the age of 87.
