= Bill Hoffman (baseball) =

American baseball player (1918-2004)

- Pitcher
- Born: March 3, 1918; Philadelphia, Pennsylvania
- Died: May 14, 2004 (aged 86); Roxborough, Pennsylvania
- Batted: Left Threw: Left

MLB debut
- August 13, 1939, for the Philadelphia Phillies

Last MLB appearance
- August 26, 1939, for the Philadelphia Phillies

Career statistics
- Win–loss record: 0–0
- Earned run average: 13.50
- Strikeouts: 1
- Stats at Baseball Reference

Teams
- Philadelphia Phillies (1939)

William Joseph Hoffman (March 3, 1918 – May 14, 2004) was a professional baseball player. He pitched in three games for the Philadelphia Phillies in August 1939.
