= Jim Holloway (baseball) =

American baseball player (1908-1997)

- Pitcher
- Born: September 22, 1908; Plaquemine, Louisiana, U.S.
- Died: April 15, 1997 (aged 88); Baton Rouge, Louisiana, U.S.
- Batted: Right Threw: Right

MLB debut
- May 17, 1929, for the Philadelphia Phillies

Last MLB appearance
- July 17, 1929, for the Philadelphia Phillies

MLB statistics
- Win–loss record: 0–0
- Earned run average: 13.50
- Strikeouts: 1
- Stats at Baseball Reference

Teams
- Philadelphia Phillies (1929)

James Madison Holloway (September 22, 1908 – April 15, 1997) was an American Major League Baseball pitcher who played for the Philadelphia Phillies in 1929.

A single in his only turn at-bat left Holloway with a rare MLB career batting average of 1.000.
