= George Hennessey =

American baseball player (1907–1988)

- Pitcher
- Born: October 28, 1907; Slatington, Pennsylvania, U.S.
- Died: January 15, 1988 (aged 80); Princeton, New Jersey, U.S.
- Batted: Right Threw: Right

MLB debut
- September 2, 1937, for the St. Louis Browns

Last MLB appearance
- June 12, 1945, for the Chicago Cubs

MLB statistics
- Win–loss record: 1–2
- Earned run average: 5.20
- Strikeouts: 8
- Stats at Baseball Reference

Teams
- St. Louis Browns (1937); Philadelphia Phillies (1942); Chicago Cubs (1945)

George Hennessey (October 28, 1907 – January 15, 1988) was an American professional baseball player who played pitcher in the Major Leagues from 1937 to 1945. Born in Slatington, Pennsylvania, he played for the St. Louis Browns, Philadelphia Phillies, and Chicago Cubs.

Hennessey died in Princeton, New Jersey, aged 80.
