= Don Hurst =

American baseball player (1905–1952)

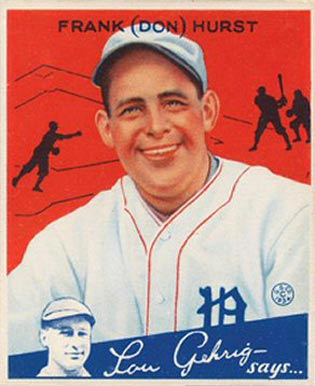
- First baseman
- Born: August 12, 1905; Maysville, Kentucky, U.S.
- Died: December 6, 1952 (aged 47); Los Angeles, California, U.S.
- Batted: Left Threw: Left

MLB debut
- May 13, 1928, for the Philadelphia Phillies

Last MLB appearance
- September 20, 1934, for the Chicago Cubs

MLB statistics
- Batting average: .298
- Home runs: 115
- Runs batted in: 610
- Stats at Baseball Reference

Teams
- Philadelphia Phillies (1928–1934); Chicago Cubs (1934)

Career highlights and awards
- NL RBI leader (1932)

Frank O'Donnell "Don" Hurst (August 12, 1905 – December 6, 1952) was a first baseman in Major League Baseball. He played with the Philadelphia Phillies and Chicago Cubs from 1928 to 1934. In 1932, he led the National League in runs batted in with 143. Hurst stood at 6 ft 0 in (1.83 m).

== Biography ==
Hurst was born in Maysville, Kentucky, and attended Ohio State University. He started his professional baseball career in 1926 in the International League. Hurst had two good years in the IL. He was traded to the Phillies on May 11, 1928, and made his major league debut two days later.

Playing in Philadelphia's hitter's park, Hurst put up some big numbers from 1928 to 1932. In 1929, he slugged a career-high 31 home runs and drove in 125 runs. His best season was 1932, when he batted .339 with 24 home runs and led the National League with 143 runs batted in. However, he slumped badly in 1933 and 1934.

In June 1934, Hurst was traded to the Cubs for first baseman Dolph Camilli. The deal proved to be a disaster for Chicago because, while Camilli went on to become one of the best sluggers in baseball, Hurst had nothing left in the tank. In 51 games for the Cubs, he batted .199 with only 3 home runs and 12 RBI and never played in the majors again.

In a 7-year career, Hurst appeared in 905 games and had a .298 batting average (976-for-3275) with 115 home runs and 610 RBI. His career numbers include 510 runs, 190 doubles, 28 triples, 41 stolen bases, and 391 walks for a .375 on-base percentage and .478 slugging percentage. He posted a .987 fielding percentage as a first baseman.

Hurst spent the next few years in the minor leagues. He managed the Hamilton Red Wings in 1939 and then retired from baseball. In his later years, he worked at the Veterans Memorial Auditorium in Culver City, California.

In 1952, Hurst became ill and died from a pulmonary tumor complicated by metastatic cancer in December, at the age of 47. He was survived by his wife and three sons.

== See also ==
- List of Major League Baseball annual runs batted in leaders
