= Paul Hoover (baseball) =

American baseball player and coach (born 1976)

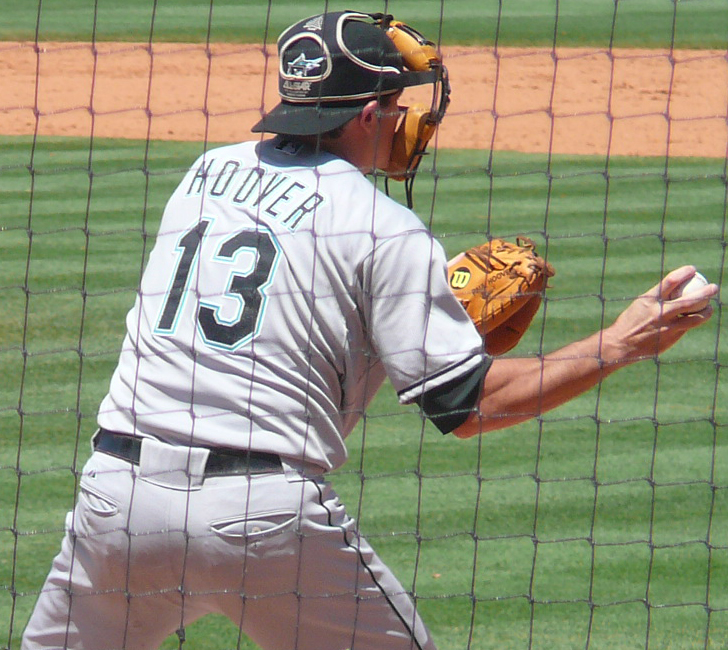
- Hoover with the Florida Marlins

Kansas City Royals – No. 49
- Catcher / Coach
- Born: April 14, 1976 (age 50); Columbus, Ohio, U.S.
- Batted: Right Threw: Right

MLB debut
- September 8, 2001, for the Tampa Bay Devil Rays

Last MLB appearance
- September 29, 2010, for the Philadelphia Phillies

MLB statistics
- Batting average: .250
- Home runs: 0
- Runs batted in: 8
- Stats at Baseball Reference

Teams
- As player: Tampa Bay Devil Rays (2001–2002); Florida Marlins (2006–2008); Philadelphia Phillies (2009–2010); As coach: Tampa Bay Rays (2019–2022); Kansas City Royals (2023–present)

Paul Chester Hoover (born April 14, 1976) is an American professional baseball coach and former catcher. He is currently the bench coach for the Kansas City Royals of Major League Baseball (MLB). Hoover played in MLB for the Tampa Bay Devil Rays, Florida Marlins, and the Philadelphia Phillies. He was listed as standing 6 feet 1 inch (1.85 m) tall, and weighing 220 pounds (100 kg).

== Professional career ==
=== Tampa Bay Devil Rays ===
In 1994 Hoover was drafted by the Houston Astros in the 64th round of the MLB draft, however he did not sign. Hoover was drafted by the Tampa Bay Devil Rays in the 23rd round (714th overall) of the 1997 MLB draft, with whom he signed on June 6, 1997. Hoover made his MLB debut on September 8, 2001, as a pinch hitter for Tampa Bay in a game against the Oakland Athletics; he singled to left field in his first MLB plate appearance. Hoover appeared in three games with Tampa Bay during 2001, and in five games during 2002.

=== Florida Marlins ===
Hoover next played in the major leagues in 2006, with the Florida Marlins. From 2006 through 2008, he appeared in a total of 20 games for the Marlins. On September 29, 2007, Hoover broke up a potential no-hitter in the eighth inning with an infield single to spoil a bid by John Maine of the New York Mets.

=== Philadelphia Phillies ===
On January 7, 2009, Hoover signed a minor league contract with an invitation to spring training with the Philadelphia Phillies. He appeared in a total of 12 major league games with the Phillies during 2009–2010. On October 4, 2009, Hoover hit a walk-off RBI single on the final day of the regular season against the Florida Marlins to give the Phillies a 7–6 victory. He was outrighted to Triple-A Lehigh Valley on October 28, 2010.

=== Boston Red Sox ===
In February 2011, Hoover signed a minor league contract with the Boston Red Sox, however he did not play for their organization during the 2011 regular season.

Hoover currently holds the MLB record for most seasons by a non-pitcher with 25 or fewer plate appearances, with six. He shares the record for the most seasons as a rookie, with seven seasons.

== Post-playing career ==
In 2012, the Tampa Bay Rays hired Hoover as manager for the rookie-level Gulf Coast League Rays. The team finished with a 28–32 record. In 2013, Hoover became a roving catching coordinator for Tampa Bay. In December 2018, Hoover was named the field coordinator for the Rays, replacing Rocco Baldelli, who became manager of the Minnesota Twins.

On November 13, 2022, the Kansas City Royals hired Hoover as their bench coach for the 2023 season.

== Personal life ==
Both of Hoover's parents are deaf; he learned American Sign Language at a young age.
