= Eli Hodkey =

American baseball player (1917-2005)

- Pitcher
- Born: November 3, 1917; Lorain, Ohio
- Died: August 30, 2005 (aged 87); Lorain, Ohio
- Batted: Left Threw: Left

MLB debut
- September 12, 1946, for the Philadelphia Phillies

Last MLB appearance
- September 28, 1946, for the Philadelphia Phillies

MLB statistics
- Win–loss record: 0–1
- Earned run average: 12.46
- Strikeouts: 0
- Stats at Baseball Reference

Teams
- Philadelphia Phillies (1946)

Aloysius Joseph Hodkey (November 3, 1917 – August 30, 2005) was a pitcher in Major League Baseball. He played for the Philadelphia Phillies.
