= Bert Hodges =

American baseball player (1917–2001)

- Third baseman
- Born: May 25, 1917; Knoxville, Tennessee, U.S.
- Died: January 8, 2001 (aged 83); Knoxville, Tennessee, U.S.
- Batted: Left Threw: Right

MLB debut
- April 14, 1942, for the Philadelphia Phillies

Last MLB appearance
- April 26, 1942, for the Philadelphia Phillies

MLB statistics
- Batting average: .182
- Home runs: 0
- Runs batted in: 0
- Stats at Baseball Reference

Teams
- Philadelphia Phillies (1942)

Edward Burton Hodges (May 25, 1917 – January 8, 2001) was an American Major League Baseball third baseman. Listed at 5' 11", 170 lb., he batted left-handed and threw right-handed.

Born in Knoxville, Tennessee, Hodges started his minor league career in 1937 with the Elizabethton Betsy Red Sox, playing for them three years before joining the Greenville Buckshots (1940) and the Memphis Chickasaws (1941). He entered the major leagues in 1942 with the Philadelphia Phillies, appearing in eight games from April 14 to 26.

Hodges had two singles in eleven at bats for a .182 average, but did not score a run or drive one in.

He returned to Memphis in 1942 and played one more season with them in 1947. In 797 minor league games, he hit .292 with 234 extra-base hits, including 23 home runs.

Hodges died in Knoxville, Tennessee, at the age of 83.
