= Lefty Hoerst =

American baseball player (1917–2000)

- Pitcher
- Born: August 11, 1917; Port Richmond, Philadelphia, Pennsylvania, U.S.
- Died: February 18, 2000 (aged 82); Maple Shade, New Jersey, U.S.
- Batted: Left Threw: Left

MLB debut
- April 26, 1940, for the Philadelphia Phillies

Last MLB appearance
- September 21, 1947, for the Philadelphia Phillies

MLB statistics
- Win–loss record: 10–33
- Earned run average: 5.17
- Strikeouts: 105
- Stats at Baseball Reference

Teams
- Philadelphia Phillies (1940–1942, 1946–1947)

Frank Joseph "Lefty" Hoerst (August 11, 1917 – February 18, 2000) was an American Major League Baseball pitcher.

== Biography ==
Frank Joseph Hoerst Jr. was born in the working-class neighborhood of Port Richmond, Philadelphia, to Frank Joseph Hoerst Sr., a shipyards tank inspector turned City Hall tax receiver of German descent and his wife, Alice (née Mallen), both native Pennsylvanians.

== Career ==
He pitched all or part of five seasons for the Philadelphia Phillies. He made his MLB debut in 1940, pitching in six games with the Phillies while spending most of the season with the minor league Pensacola Pilots. Hoerst played the entire 1941 and 1942 seasons in the majors before serving with the Navy during World War II. Hoerst returned to pitch for the Phillies in 1946. He then spent most of the 1947 season back in the minors with the Memphis Chickasaws, pitching in just four major league games. After spending all of 1948 with Memphis, Hoerst's professional career was over.

A 1935 graduate of Northeast Catholic High School and 1939 graduate of La Salle University, Hoerst was a two-sports stand out in baseball and basketball. He won championships in both sports while at North (baseball in 1934 and basketball in 1935). He also coached North Catholic basketball for three years in the 1940s and college baseball at LaSalle after his retirement from Major League Baseball. He was inducted into both the North Catholic Alumni Hall of Fame and the LaSalle University Athletic Hall of Fame.

Hoerst died on February 18, 2000, and was interred at Holy Sepulchre Cemetery in Cheltenham Township, Pennsylvania.
