= 1942 Boston Braves season =

1942 Boston Braves
- League: National League
- Ballpark: Braves Field
- City: Boston, Massachusetts
- Record: 59–89 (.399)
- League place: 7th
- Owners: J.A. Robert Quinn
- Managers: Casey Stengel
- Radio: WAAB (Jim Britt, Tom Hussey)

The 1942 Boston Braves season was the 72nd in franchise history.

== Regular season ==
- May 13, 1942: Jim Tobin of the Braves became the first Major League Baseball pitcher to hit three home runs in one game.

=== Season standings ===
National League
Team	W	L	Pct.	GB	Home	Road
St. Louis Cardinals	106	48	.688	—	60‍–‍17	46‍–‍31
Brooklyn Dodgers	104	50	.675	2	57‍–‍22	47‍–‍28
New York Giants	85	67	.559	20	47‍–‍31	38‍–‍36
Cincinnati Reds	76	76	.500	29	38‍–‍39	38‍–‍37
Pittsburgh Pirates	66	81	.449	36½	41‍–‍34	25‍–‍47
Chicago Cubs	68	86	.442	38	36‍–‍41	32‍–‍45
Boston Braves	59	89	.399	44	33‍–‍36	26‍–‍53
Philadelphia Phils	42	109	.278	62½	23‍–‍51	19‍–‍58

=== Record vs. opponents ===
1942 National League record Sources:
Team	BSN	BRO	CHC	CIN	NYG	PHI	PIT	STL
Boston	—	6–16	13–9	5–16–1	8–12	14–8	7–12–1	6–16
Brooklyn	16–6	—	16–6	15–7	14–8–1	18–4	16–6	9–13
Chicago	9–13	6–16	—	13–9	9–13–1	14–8	11–11	6–16
Cincinnati	16–5–1	7–15	9–13	—	9–13	16–6	12–9–1	7–15
New York	12–8	8–14–1	13–9–1	13–9	—	17–5	15–7	7–15
Philadelphia	8–14	4–18	8–14	6–16	5–17	—	6–13	5–17
Pittsburgh	12–7–1	6–16	11–11	9–12–1	7–15	13–6	—	8–14–2
St. Louis	16–6	13–9	16–6	15–7	15–7	17–5	14–8–2	—

=== Roster ===
1942 Boston Braves
Roster
Pitchers: 20 George Diehl; 21 Bill Donovan; 26 Tom Earley; 19 Dick Errickson; 24 Jim Hickey; 17 Johnny Hutchings; 18 Al Javery; 29 Art Johnson; 24 Frank LaManna; 28 Johnny Sain; 23 Manny Salvo; 16 Warren Spahn; 22 Jim Tobin; 27 Lou Tost; 16 Lefty Wallace	Catchers: 11 Clyde Kluttz; 5 Ernie Lombardi; 10 Phil Masi; Infielders: 16 Tony Cuccinello; 31 Ducky Detweiler; 3 Nanny Fernandez; 30 Buddy Gremp; 7 Eddie Miller; 14 Skippy Roberge; 19 Mike Sandlock; 2 Sibby Sisti; 4 Max West; 25 Whitey Wietelmann	Outfielders: 9 Johnny Cooney; 12,31 Frank Demaree; 1 Tommy Holmes; 20 Frank McElyea; 6 Chet Ross; 8 Paul Waner	Manager: 32 Casey Stengel; Coaches: 9 Johnny Cooney; 33 George Kelly

== Player stats ==
=== Batting ===
==== Starters by position ====
Note: Pos = Position; G = Games played; AB = At bats; H = Hits; Avg. = Batting average; HR = Home runs; RBI = Runs batted in

Pos	Player	G	AB	H	Avg.	HR	RBI
C	Ernie Lombardi	105	309	102	.330	11	46
1B	Max West	134	452	115	.254	16	56
2B	Sibby Sisti	129	407	86	.211	4	35
3B	Nanny Fernandez	145	577	147	.255	6	55
SS	Eddie Miller	142	534	130	.243	6	47
OF	Chet Ross	76	220	43	.195	5	19
OF	Tommy Holmes	141	558	155	.278	4	41
OF	Paul Waner	114	333	86	.258	1	39

==== Other batters ====
Note: G = Games played; AB = At bats; H = Hits; Avg. = Batting average; HR = Home runs; RBI = Runs batted in

Player	G	AB	H	Avg.	HR	RBI
Clyde Kluttz	72	210	56	.267	1	31
Buddy Gremp	72	207	45	.217	3	19
Johnny Cooney	74	198	41	.207	0	7
Frank Demaree	64	187	42	.225	3	24
Skippy Roberge	74	172	37	.215	1	12
Tony Cuccinello	40	104	21	.202	1	8
Phil Masi	57	87	19	.218	0	9
Ducky Detweiler	12	44	14	.318	0	5
Whitey Wietelmann	13	34	7	.206	0	0
Frank McElyea	7	4	0	.000	0	0
Mike Sandlock	2	1	1	1.000	0	0

=== Pitching ===
==== Starting pitchers ====
Note: G = Games pitched; IP = Innings pitched; W = Wins; L = Losses; ERA = Earned run average; SO = Strikeouts

Player	G	IP	W	L	ERA	SO
Jim Tobin	37	287.2	12	21	3.97	71
Al Javery	42	261.0	12	16	3.03	85
Jim Hickey	1	1.1	0	1	20.25	0

==== Other pitchers ====
Note: G = Games pitched; IP = Innings pitched; W = Wins; L = Losses; ERA = Earned run average; SO = Strikeouts

Player	G	IP	W	L	ERA	SO
Lou Tost	35	147.2	10	10	3.53	43
Manny Salvo	25	130.2	7	8	3.03	25
Tom Earley	27	112.2	6	11	4.71	28
Bill Donovan	31	89.1	3	6	3.43	23
Johnny Hutchings	20	65.2	1	0	4.39	27
Lefty Wallace	19	49.1	1	3	3.83	20
Warren Spahn	4	15.2	0	0	5.74	7

==== Relief pitchers ====
Note: G = Games pitched; W = Wins; L = Losses; SV = Saves; ERA = Earned run average; SO = Strikeouts

Player	G	W	L	SV	ERA	SO
Johnny Sain	40	4	7	6	3.90	68
Dick Errickson	21	2	5	1	5.01	15
Hank LaManna	5	0	1	0	5.40	2
Art Johnson	4	0	0	0	1.42	0
George Diehl	1	0	0	0	2.45	0

== Farm system ==
Level	Team	League	Manager
A	Hartford Bees	Eastern League	Del Bissonette
B	Evansville Bees	Illinois–Indiana–Iowa League	Bob Coleman
D	Greeneville Burley Cubs	Appalachian League	Dale Alexander
D	Welch Miners	Mountain State League	Don Manno
D	Bradford Bees	PONY League	Jack Burns

Greeneville club folded, June 14, 1942
