= 1941 Boston Braves season =

1941 Boston Braves
- League: National League
- Ballpark: Braves Field
- City: Boston, Massachusetts
- Record: 62–92 (.403)
- League place: 7th
- Owners: J.A. Robert Quinn
- Managers: Casey Stengel
- Radio: WAAB (Jim Britt, Tom Hussey)

The 1941 Boston Braves season was the 71st season of the franchise, and saw the team revert to the “Braves” moniker after five seasons playing under the name of “Boston Bees”. The Braves finished seventh in the National League with a record of 62 wins and 92 losses.

== Regular season ==
=== Season standings ===
National League
| Team | W | L | Pct. | GB | Home | Road |
|---|---|---|---|---|---|---|
| Brooklyn Dodgers | 100 | 54 | .649 | — | 52‍–‍25 | 48‍–‍29 |
| St. Louis Cardinals | 97 | 56 | .634 | 2½ | 53‍–‍24 | 44‍–‍32 |
| Cincinnati Reds | 88 | 66 | .571 | 12 | 45‍–‍34 | 43‍–‍32 |
| Pittsburgh Pirates | 81 | 73 | .526 | 19 | 45‍–‍32 | 36‍–‍41 |
| New York Giants | 74 | 79 | .484 | 25½ | 38‍–‍39 | 36‍–‍40 |
| Chicago Cubs | 70 | 84 | .455 | 30 | 38‍–‍39 | 32‍–‍45 |
| Boston Braves | 62 | 92 | .403 | 38 | 32‍–‍44 | 30‍–‍48 |
| Philadelphia Phillies | 43 | 111 | .279 | 57 | 23‍–‍52 | 20‍–‍59 |

=== Record vs. opponents ===
1941 National League record Sources:
| Team | BSN | BRO | CHC | CIN | NYG | PHI | PIT | STL |
|---|---|---|---|---|---|---|---|---|
| Boston | — | 4–18–2 | 11–11 | 9–13 | 6–16 | 14–8 | 10–12 | 8–14 |
| Brooklyn | 18–4–2 | — | 13–9 | 14–8 | 14–8 | 18–4 | 12–10 | 11–11–1 |
| Chicago | 11–11 | 9–13 | — | 8–14 | 9–13 | 14–8–1 | 9–13 | 10–12 |
| Cincinnati | 13–9 | 8–14 | 14–8 | — | 15–7 | 16–6 | 12–10 | 10–12 |
| New York | 16–6 | 8–14 | 13–9 | 7–15 | — | 16–6 | 8–14–2 | 6–15–1 |
| Philadelphia | 8–14 | 4–18 | 8–14–1 | 6–16 | 6–16 | — | 6–16 | 5–17 |
| Pittsburgh | 12–10 | 10–12 | 13–9 | 10–12 | 14–8–2 | 16–6 | — | 6–16 |
| St. Louis | 14–8 | 11–11–1 | 12–10 | 12–10 | 15–6–1 | 17–5 | 16–6 | — |

=== Notable transactions ===
- September 20, 1941: Nanny Fernandez was purchased by the Braves from the San Francisco Seals.

=== Roster ===
1941 Boston Braves
Roster
| Pitchers: 27 George Barnicle; 20 Eddie Carnett; 26 Tom Earley; 19 Dick Errickson; 30 Wes Ferrell; 5,28 Johnny Hutchings; 18 Al Javery; 29 Art Johnson; 24 Frank LaManna; 28 Al Piechota; 17 Bill Posedel; 23 Manny Salvo; 25 Nick Strincevich; 21 Joe Sullivan; 22 Jim Tobin | Catchers: 11 Ray Berres; 10 Phil Masi; 27 Al Montgomery; Infielders: 5 Babe Dahlgren; -- John Dudra; 34 Buddy Gremp; 2 Buddy Hassett; -- Hank Majeski; 7 Eddie Miller; 3 Skippy Roberge; 16 Bama Rowell; 1 Sibby Sisti; 15 Whitey Wietelmann | Outfielders: 3 Earl Averill; -- Buster Bray; 9 Johnny Cooney; 20 Frank Demaree; 35 Don Manno; 8 Gene Moore; 36 Mel Preibisch; 6 Chet Ross; 17 Lloyd Waner; 31,37 Paul Waner; 4 Max West | Manager: 32 Casey Stengel; Coaches: 9 Johnny Cooney; 33 George Kelly |

== Player stats ==
| = Indicates team leader |

=== Batting ===
==== Starters by position ====
Note: Pos = Position; G = Games played; AB = At bats; H = Hits; Avg. = Batting average; HR = Home runs; RBI = Runs batted in

| Pos | Player | G | AB | H | Avg. | HR | RBI |
|---|---|---|---|---|---|---|---|
| C | Ray Berres | 120 | 279 | 56 | .201 | 1 | 19 |
| 1B | Buddy Hassett | 118 | 405 | 120 | .296 | 1 | 33 |
| 2B | Bama Rowell | 138 | 483 | 129 | .267 | 7 | 60 |
| SS | Eddie Miller | 154 | 585 | 140 | .239 | 6 | 68 |
| 3B | Sibby Sisti | 140 | 541 | 140 | .259 | 1 | 45 |
| OF | Gene Moore | 129 | 397 | 108 | .272 | 5 | 43 |
| OF | Johnny Cooney | 123 | 442 | 141 | .319 | 0 | 29 |
| OF | Max West | 138 | 484 | 134 | .277 | 12 | 68 |

==== Other batters ====
Note: G = Games played; AB = At bats; H = Hits; Avg. = Batting average; HR = Home runs; RBI = Runs batted in

| Player | G | AB | H | Avg. | HR | RBI |
|---|---|---|---|---|---|---|
| Paul Waner | 95 | 294 | 82 | .279 | 2 | 46 |
| Phil Masi | 87 | 180 | 40 | .222 | 3 | 18 |
| Skippy Roberge | 55 | 167 | 36 | .216 | 0 | 15 |
| Babe Dahlgren | 44 | 166 | 39 | .235 | 7 | 30 |
| Frank Demaree | 48 | 113 | 26 | .230 | 2 | 15 |
| Buddy Gremp | 37 | 75 | 18 | .240 | 0 | 10 |
| Hank Majeski | 19 | 55 | 8 | .145 | 0 | 3 |
| Al Montgomery | 42 | 52 | 10 | .192 | 0 | 4 |
| Lloyd Waner | 19 | 51 | 21 | .412 | 0 | 4 |
| Chet Ross | 29 | 50 | 6 | .120 | 0 | 4 |
| Whitey Wietelmann | 16 | 33 | 3 | .091 | 0 | 0 |
| Don Manno | 22 | 30 | 5 | .167 | 0 | 4 |
| John Dudra | 14 | 25 | 9 | .360 | 0 | 3 |
| Earl Averill | 8 | 17 | 2 | .118 | 0 | 2 |
| Buster Bray | 4 | 11 | 1 | .091 | 0 | 1 |
| Mel Preibisch | 5 | 4 | 0 | .000 | 0 | 0 |

=== Pitching ===
==== Starting pitchers ====
Note: G = Games pitched; IP = Innings pitched; W = Wins; L = Losses; ERA = Earned run average; SO = Strikeouts

| Player | G | IP | W | L | ERA | SO |
|---|---|---|---|---|---|---|
| Jim Tobin | 33 | 238.0 | 12 | 12 | 3.10 | 61 |
| Manny Salvo | 35 | 195.0 | 7 | 16 | 4.06 | 67 |
| George Barnicle | 1 | 6.2 | 0 | 1 | 6.75 | 2 |

==== Other pitchers ====
Note: G = Games pitched; IP = Innings pitched; W = Wins; L = Losses; ERA = Earned run average; SO = Strikeouts

| Player | G | IP | W | L | ERA | SO |
|---|---|---|---|---|---|---|
| Art Johnson | 43 | 183.1 | 7 | 15 | 3.53 | 70 |
| Dick Errickson | 38 | 165.2 | 6 | 12 | 4.78 | 45 |
| Al Javery | 34 | 160.2 | 10 | 11 | 4.31 | 54 |
| Tom Earley | 33 | 138.2 | 6 | 8 | 2.53 | 54 |
| Johnny Hutchings | 36 | 95.2 | 1 | 6 | 4.14 | 36 |
| Bill Posedel | 18 | 53.2 | 4 | 4 | 4.87 | 10 |
| Wes Ferrell | 4 | 14.0 | 2 | 1 | 5.14 | 10 |

==== Relief pitchers ====
Note: G = Games pitched; W = Wins; L = Losses; SV = Saves; ERA = Earned run average; SO = Strikeouts

| Player | G | W | L | SV | ERA | SO |
|---|---|---|---|---|---|---|
| Hank LaManna | 35 | 5 | 4 | 1 | 5.33 | 23 |
| Joe Sullivan | 16 | 2 | 2 | 0 | 4.13 | 11 |
| Nick Strincevich | 3 | 0 | 0 | 0 | 10.80 | 1 |
| Eddie Carnett | 2 | 0 | 0 | 0 | 20.25 | 2 |
| Al Piechota | 1 | 0 | 0 | 0 | 0.00 | 0 |

== Farm system ==
| Level | Team | League | Manager |
|---|---|---|---|
| A | Hartford Bees | Eastern League | Jack Onslow and Don Manno |
| B | Evansville Bees | Illinois–Indiana–Iowa League | Bob Coleman |
| B | Bridgeport Bees | Interstate League | Rudy Hulswitt |
| D | Bradford Bees | PONY League | Del Bissonette |

LEAGUE CHAMPIONS: Bradford
