= Zanesville Greys =

- 1933–1937; (1933-1937, 1941-1942); Zanesville, Ohio

Minor league affiliations
- Class: Class C (1933–1937, 1941-1942)
- League: Middle Atlantic League (1933–1937, 1941,1942)

Major league affiliations
- Team: Cleveland Indians (1933-1936); Boston Bees (1937); Chicago Cubs (1941–1942)

Minor league titles
- League titles (3): 1933; 1934; 1936
- Conference titles (3): 1934; 1935; 1936
- Wild card berths (1): 1933

Team data
- Name: Zanesville Greys (1933-1937); Zanesville Cubs (1941–1942)
- Ballpark: Mark Greys Athletic Park (1933-1937); Gant Park Municipal Stadium (1941–1942)

The Zanesville Greys were a minor league baseball team based in Zanesville, Ohio. The Greys played as members of the Class C level Middle Atlantic League from 1933 to 1937, winning league championships in 1933, 1934 and 1936. The Greys were a minor league affiliate of the Cleveland Indians from 1933 to 1936 and the Boston Bees in 1937, before Zanesville folded for three seasons. In 1941 and 1942, the Zanesville Cubs resumed Middle Atlantic League play, becoming a minor league affiliate of the Chicago Cubs.

The Greys hosted minor league home games exclusively Mark Greys Athletic Park, before the Cubs moved home games to newly constructed Gant Park Municipal Stadium in 1941.

From 1993 to 1996, the "Greys" nickname was revived by the Zanesville franchise of the independent Frontier League.

== History ==
=== Early teams ===
After minor league baseball in Zanesville began with the 1887 Zanesville Kickapoos, who played the season as charter members of the Ohio State League, the 1933 Zanesville Grays were immediately preceded in minor league play by the 1913 Zanesville Flood Sufferers of the Class B level Interstate League.

The "Greys" nickname originated in 1918 with a semi-professional team of employees from the Mark Manufacturing Company. The Greys name reportedly derived from the Cleveland Greys of the Ohio National Guard. Reportedly, Olympic champion, major league and NFL player Jim Thorpe played for a semi-pro Grays team in 1925.

=== Middle Atlantic League 1933 to 1937 ===
In 1933 the Zanesville "Greys" resumed minor league play, becoming members of the Class C level Middle Atlantic League, as the league expanded from six teams to eight teams, adding Zanesville and Dayton to the league as the expansion teams. Zanesville was a minor league affiliate of the Cleveland Indians, beginning a four year partnership. The Beckley Black Knights, Charleston Senators, Dayton Ducks, Huntington Boosters, Johnstown Johnnies, Springfield Chicks and Wheeling Stogies teams joined Zanesville in beginning league play on May 4, 1933.

In their first season of play Zanesville won the 1933 Middle Atlantic League championship. The Greys ended the Middle Atlantic League regular season with a record of 76–59, finishing 3.0 games behind the first place Wheeling Stogies, as Johnny Walker and Buzz Wetzel served as manages. Zanesville and Wheeling met in the two-team playoff, with Zanesville winning the title in beating the Stogies 4 games to 1. Pitcher Al Milnar of Zanesville led the league with 194 strikeouts.

The Greys won consecutive league championships, by winning the title in the 1934 Middle State League, while also capturing the league pennant. With a record of 72–51, Zanesville placed first in the eight–team league regular season, playing the season under managers Bert Grimm, Harry Lane and Earl Wolgamot. The Grays finished 2.0 games ahead of the second place Dayton Ducks. In the playoff, Zanesville defeated Dayton in a full seven game series.

The Greys won the league pennant in 1935, finishing the regular season with the league's best record. However, with the league adopting a split season schedule, Zanesville did not qualify for the league playoff, Greys did not win either half. Zanesville had an overall record of 70–54 to place first in the Middle Atlantic League regular season, finishing 1.0 games ahead of the second place Dayton Ducks. Earl Wolgamot again managed Zanesville. In the playoff, Dayton defeated Huntington for the league title. Jimmy Wasdell of Zanesville won the league batting title, hitting .357. Teammate Milt McIntyre led the league with both 24 home runs and 110 RBI.

On Sunday, May 3, 1936, just before the start of the regular season, the Zanesville Grays hosted two exhibition games against the Pittsburgh Crawfords, the defending champions of the Negro National League. The Crawfords won both games of the doubleheader by scores of 14-4 and 7-0. Baseball Hall of Fame members Josh Gibson, Oscar Charleston and Judy Johnson hit home runs and Satchel Page pitched the second game. Paige pitched a 7-inning no-hitter in the game, held at Mark Park.

Continuing play in the eight-team Middle Atlantic League, the 1936 Greys won the league pennant and their third league championship in their final season as a Cleveland Indians affiliate. With Earl Wolgamot continuing as manager, Zanesville ended the 1936 regular season with a record of 81–48, finishing 10.0 games ahead of the second place Charleston Senators. In the split season, Zanesville had won the first half season and tied with Dayton in the second half. In the playoff, the Grays defeated the Dayton two games to one to win the championship. Zanesville pitcher Tommy Reis led the league with both 21 wins and a 21-9 record. Jeff Heath had 187 RBI to lead the league, while teammate Oscar Grimes scored 150 runs.

In 1937, the Greys finished in last place in the Middle Atlantic League, as the franchise became a minor league affiliate of the Boston Bees. Zanesville finished the regular season with a record of 33-88, playing the season under manager Possum Whitted. Zanesville finished 45.0 games behind the first place Canton Terriers in the final regular season standings. The Zanesville franchise did not return to play in the 1938 Middle Atlantic League, replaced by the Erie Sailors in league play.

=== Middle Atlantic League 1941-1942 ===
In 1941, the Middle Atlantic League expanded from six teams to eight teams with the Zanesville franchise returning to the league after a three-season absence. With the franchise becoming an affiliate of the Chicago Cubs, Zanesville adopted the "Cubs" nickname. The Cubs were joined in league play by the Akron Yankees, Portsmouth A's, Canton Terriers, Charleston Senators, Erie Sailors, Dayton Ducks, Springfield Cardinals and Youngstown Browns teams in beginning league play on May 1, 1941.

The 1941 Zanesville Cubs finished in last place in the eight-team Middle Atlantic League. The Cubs ended the regular season with record of 43–73, playing under manager Jack Warner. Zanesville finished 29½ games behind the first place Akron Yankees in the regular season final standings. Zanesville did not qualify for the playoffs, won by the Erie Sailors.

In their final season, the 1942 Zanesville Cubs finished in last place in the six-team Middle Atlantic League. The Cubs ended their final regular season with record of 46–84, playing under manager returning Jack Warner. Zanesville finished 31.0 games behind of the first place Charleston Senators in the regular season final standings. Zanesville did not qualify for the four-team playoffs, again won by the Erie Sailors. The Middle Atlantic League did not return to play in 1943 as a result of World War II. The league returned to play in 1945.

After a one season hiatus during World War II, Zanesville resumed minor league baseball play in 1944 in a new league. The Zanesville Dodgers became members of the six–team Class D level Ohio State League, which resumed play following World War II.

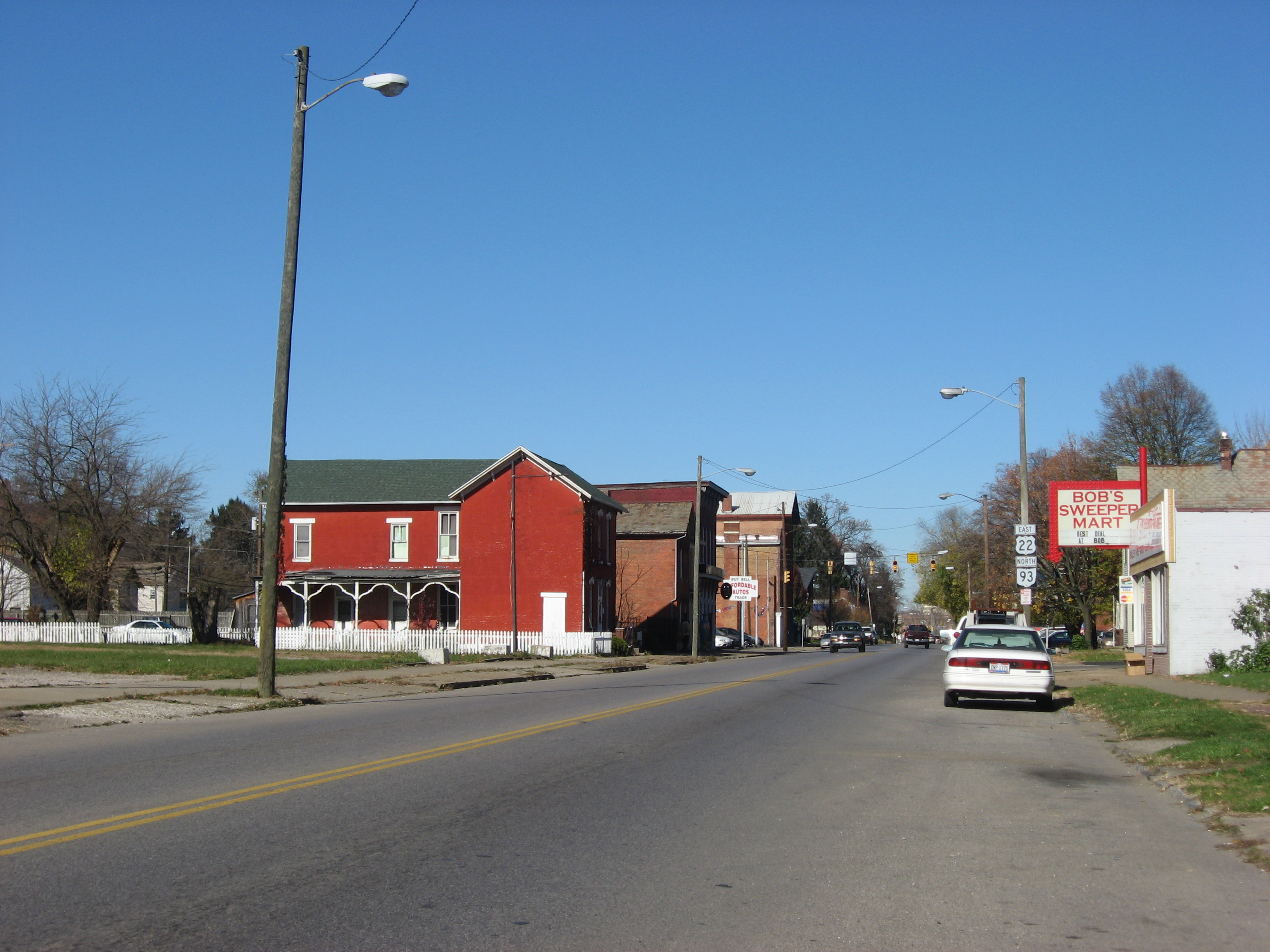
(2009) Putnam Avenue. Putnam Historic District. National Register of Historic Places. Zanesville, Ohio

== The ballparks ==
The Zanesville Grays hosted home minor league home games at "Mark Park" or Mark Greys Athletic Park for their duration. The ballpark had field dimensions of (Left, Center, Right): 304-386-265 with a seating capacity of 2,000. The park was located at Putnam Avenue & Ontario Street in Zanesville, Ohio. The location corresponds to the location of today's War Veteran's Park.

Later, the 1941 Zanesville Cubs began play at Gant Park Municipal Stadium, which was called "Municipal Stadium" in the era. The Zanesville Dodgers continued play at the ballpark. Located on West Main Street, Gant Stadium is still in use today and received a State Historic Designation in 2021. The stadium was originally constructed in 1939. The facility was named for Nelson T. Gant who was the former owner of the property before donating it.

== Timeline ==
Year(s)	# Yrs.	Team	Level	League	Affiliate	Ballpark
1933–1936	4	Zanesville Greys	Class C	Middle Atlantic League	Cleveland Indians	Mark Greys Athletic Park
1937	1	Zanesville Greys	Class C	Middle Atlantic League	Boston Bees	Mark Greys Athletic Park
1941-1942	1	Zanesville Cubs	Class C	Middle Atlantic League	Chicago Cubs	Gant Stadium

== Year–by–year records ==
Year	Record	Finish	Manager	Playoffs / notes
1933	76–59	2nd	Johnny Walker / Buzz Wetzel	League champions
1934	72–51	1st	Bert Grimm / Harry Lane; Earl Wolgamot	League pennant League champions
1935	70–54	1st	Earl Wolgamot	League pennant Did not qualify
1936	71–54	1st	Earl Wolgamot	League pennant League champions
1937	33–88	8th	Possum Whitted	Did not qualify
1941	43–73	8th	Jack Warner	Did not qualify
1942	46–84	6th	Jack Warner	Did not qualify

== Notable alumni ==
- Dale Alderson (1942)
- Stan Andrews (1937)
- George Barnicle (1937)
- Bob Barr (1941)
- Fern Bell (1941)
- Clay Bryant (1933)
- Jess Cortazzo (1935)
- Herb Crompton (1935)
- Woody Davis (1934-1936)
- Ed Fernandes (1936)
- Bill Ford (1937)
- Jim Gleeson (1933)
- Oscar Grimes (1936)
- Tom Hafey (1935)
- Dick Hahn (1935-1936)
- Jeff Heath (1936) 2x MLB All-Star
- Hank Helf (1934)
- Tommy Henrich (1934-1935) 5x MLB All-Star
- Otto Huber (1937)
- Roy Hughes (1933)
- Jack Kraus (1936)
- Glenn Liebhardt (1934)
- Nig Lipscomb (1941)
- Bill Lobe (1945)
- Mike McCormick (1935) Cincinnati Reds Hall of Fame
- George McKinnon (1945)
- Al Milnar (1933) MLB All-Star
- Hiker Moran (1937)
- Mike Palagyi (1936)
- Tommy Reis (1933-1936)
- Chet Ross (1937)
- Ed Sauer (1941)
- Skeeter Scalzi (1936)
- Chuck Shanklin (1945)
- Jim Shilling (1936)
- Bill Sodd (1935-1936)
- Paul Speraw (1933)
- Charley Stanceu (1934-1936)
- Charley Suche (1936)
- Steve Sundra (1933)
- Jim Thorpe (1925) Pro Football Hall of Fame
- Johnny Walker (1933, MGR)
- Jack Warner (1941)
- Jimmy Wasdell (1935)
- Earl Wolgamot (1934-1936, MGR)
- Joe Zapustas (1934)
- Bill Zuber (1933, 1935-1936)
- Zanesville Grays players
- Zanesville Cubs players
