= List of Major League Baseball players (Wa–Wh) =

The following is a list of Major League Baseball players, retired or active.

== Wa through Wh ==
Name	Debut	Final game	Position	Teams	Ref
Michael Wacha	May 30, 2013		Pitcher	St. Louis Cardinals, New York Mets, Tampa Bay Rays, Boston Red Sox, San Diego Padres, Kansas City Royals	
Paul Wachtel	September 18, 1917	September 27, 1917	Pitcher	Brooklyn Robins	
Jimmy Wacker	April 28, 1909	April 28, 1909	Pitcher	Pittsburgh Pirates	
Tsuyoshi Wada	July 8, 2014	September 4, 2015	Chicago Cubs		
Brandon Waddell	August 14, 2020		Pitcher	Pittsburgh Pirates, Minnesota Twins, Baltimore Orioles, St. Louis Cardinals, New York Mets	
Jason Waddell	May 31, 2009	June 12, 2009	Pitcher	Chicago Cubs	
Rube Waddell β	September 8, 1897	August 1, 1910	Pitcher	Louisville Colonels, Pittsburgh Pirates, Chicago Orphans, Philadelphia Athletics, St. Louis Browns	
Tom Waddell	April 15, 1984	April 20, 1987	Pitcher	Cleveland Indians	
Frank Waddey	April 16, 1931	June 27, 1931	Outfielder	St. Louis Browns	
Ben Wade	April 30, 1948	June 12, 1955	Pitcher	Chicago Cubs, Brooklyn Dodgers	
Cory Wade	April 24, 2008		Pitcher	Los Angeles Dodgers, New York Yankees	
Gale Wade	April 11, 1955	May 8, 1956	Outfielder	Chicago Cubs	
Ham Wade	September 9, 1907	September 9, 1907	Outfielder	New York Giants	
Jake Wade	April 22, 1936	September 13, 1946	Pitcher	Detroit Tigers, Boston Red Sox, St. Louis Browns, Chicago White Sox, New York Yankees, Washington Senators	
Konner Wade	June 26, 2021	October 2, 2021	Pitcher	Baltimore Orioles	
LaMonte Wade Jr.	June 28, 2019		First baseman	Minnesota Twins, San Francisco Giants, Los Angeles Angels	
Rip Wade	April 19, 1923	October 4, 1923	Outfielder	Washington Senators	
Terrell Wade	September 12, 1995	September 26, 1998	Pitcher	Atlanta Braves, Tampa Bay Devil Rays	
Tyler Wade	June 27, 2017		Utility player	New York Yankees, Los Angeles Angels, Oakland Athletics, San Diego Padres	
Jack Wadsworth	May 1, 1890	April 29, 1895	Pitcher	Cleveland Spiders, Baltimore Orioles, Louisville Colonels	
Doug Waechter	August 27, 2003	August 11, 2009	Pitcher	Tampa Bay Devil Rays, Florida Marlins, Kansas City Royals	
Eric Wagaman	September 10, 2024		First baseman	Los Angeles Angels, Miami Marlins	
Woody Wagenhorst	June 25, 1888	June 25, 1888	Third baseman	Philadelphia Quakers	
Bill Wagner	July 16, 1914	September 2, 1918	Catcher	Pittsburgh Pirates, Boston Braves	
Billy Wagner β	September 13, 1995	October 3, 2010	Pitcher	Houston Astros, Philadelphia Phillies, New York Mets, Boston Red Sox, Atlanta Braves	
Bull Wagner	June 2, 1913	May 30, 1914	Pitcher	Brooklyn Superbas/Robins	
Butts Wagner	April 27, 1898	October 10, 1898	Third baseman	Washington Senators (1891–99), Brooklyn Bridegrooms	
Charlie Wagner	April 19, 1938	August 8, 1946	Pitcher	Boston Red Sox	
Gary Wagner	April 18, 1965	September 26, 1970	Pitcher	Philadelphia Phillies, Boston Red Sox	
Hal Wagner	October 3, 1937	April 19, 1949	Catcher	Philadelphia Athletics, Boston Red Sox, Detroit Tigers, Philadelphia Phillies	
Héctor Wagner	September 10, 1990	June 24, 1991	Pitcher	Kansas City Royals	
Heinie Wagner	July 1, 1902	July 3, 1918	Shortstop	New York Giants, Boston Red Sox	
Honus Wagner β	July 19, 1897	September 17, 1917	Shortstop	Louisville Colonels, Pittsburgh Pirates	
Joe Wagner	April 25, 1915	October 3, 1915	Second baseman	Cincinnati Reds	
Leon Wagner	June 22, 1958	October 2, 1969	Outfielder	San Francisco Giants, St. Louis Cardinals, Los Angeles Angels, Cleveland Indians, Chicago White Sox	
Mark Wagner	August 20, 1976	September 30, 1984	Shortstop	Detroit Tigers, Texas Rangers, Oakland Athletics	
Matt Wagner	June 5, 1996	September 22, 1996	Pitcher	Seattle Mariners	
Neil Wagner	August 30, 2011	May 14, 2014	Pitcher	Oakland Athletics, Toronto Blue Jays	
Paul Wagner	July 26, 1992	May 7, 1999	Pitcher	Pittsburgh Pirates, Milwaukee Brewers, Cleveland Indians	
Ryan Wagner	July 19, 2003	May 6, 2007	Pitcher	Cincinnati Reds, Washington Nationals	
Tyler Wagner	May 31, 2015	April 24, 2016	Pitcher	Milwaukee Brewers, Arizona Diamondbacks	
Will Wagner	August 12, 2024		Infielder	Toronto Blue Jays, San Diego Padres	
Jacob Waguespack	May 27, 2019		Pitcher	Toronto Blue Jays, Tampa Bay Rays	
Bobby Wahl	May 3, 2017	July 28, 2020	Pitcher	Oakland Athletics, Milwaukee Brewers	
Kermit Wahl	June 23, 1944	July 29, 1951	Utility infielder	Cincinnati Reds, Philadelphia Athletics, St. Louis Browns	
Dave Wainhouse	August 3, 1991	April 27, 2000	Pitcher	Montreal Expos, Seattle Mariners, Pittsburgh Pirates, Colorado Rockies, St. Louis Cardinals	
Adam Wainwright	September 11, 2005	October 1, 2023	Pitcher	St. Louis Cardinals	
Cole Waites	September 13, 2022		Pitcher	San Francisco Giants	
Eddie Waitkus	April 15, 1941	September 20, 1955	First baseman	Chicago Cubs, Philadelphia Phillies, Baltimore Orioles	
Rick Waits	September 17, 1973	October 6, 1985	Pitcher	Texas Rangers, Cleveland Indians, Milwaukee Brewers	
Charlie Waitt	May 25, 1875	September 18, 1883	Outfielder	St. Louis Brown Stockings, Chicago White Stockings, Baltimore Orioles (19th century), Philadelphia Quakers	
Don Wakamatsu	May 22, 1991	October 5, 1991	Catcher	Chicago White Sox	
Bill Wakefield	April 18, 1964	October 4, 1964	Pitcher	New York Mets	
Dick Wakefield	June 26, 1941	May 6, 1952	Outfielder	Detroit Tigers, New York Yankees, New York Giants	
Howard Wakefield	September 18, 1905	August 15, 1907	Catcher	Cleveland Naps, Washington Senators	
Tim Wakefield	July 31, 1992	September 25, 2011	Pitcher	Pittsburgh Pirates, Boston Red Sox	
Chris Wakeland	September 4, 2001	October 6, 2001	Outfielder	Detroit Tigers	
Matt Walbeck	April 7, 1993	September 28, 2003	Catcher	Chicago Cubs, Minnesota Twins, Detroit Tigers, Anaheim Angels, Philadelphia Phillies	
Rube Walberg	April 29, 1923	October 2, 1937	Pitcher	New York Giants, Philadelphia Athletics, Boston Red Sox	
Ed Wałczak	September 3, 1945	September 30, 1945	Second baseman	Philadelphia Phillies	
Doc Waldbauer	September 24, 1917	September 29, 1917	Pitcher	Washington Senators	
Fred Walden	June 3, 1912	June 3, 1912	Catcher	St. Louis Browns	
Jordan Walden	August 22, 2010		Pitcher	Los Angeles Angels of Anaheim	
Marcus Walden	April 1, 2018	September 22, 2020	Pitcher	Boston Red Sox	
Ken Waldichuk	September 1, 2022		Pitcher	Oakland Athletics	
Mitch Walding	May 30, 2018	April 23, 2019	Third baseman	Philadelphia Phillies	
Hurston Waldrep	June 9, 2024		Pitcher	Atlanta Braves	
Irv Waldron	April 25, 1901	September 27, 1901	Outfielder	Milwaukee Brewers (1901), Washington Senators	
Matt Waldron	June 24, 2023		Pitcher	San Diego Padres	
Kyle Waldrop (P)	September 5, 2011	October 2, 2012	Pitcher	Minnesota Twins	
Kyle Waldrop (OF)	August 2, 2015	August 16, 2016	Outfielder	Cincinnati Reds	
Jim Walewander	May 31, 1987	October 3, 1993	Second baseman	Detroit Tigers, New York Yankees, California Angels	
Bob Walk	May 26, 1980	September 29, 1993	Pitcher	Philadelphia Phillies, Atlanta Braves, Pittsburgh Pirates	
Bill Walker	September 13, 1927	September 14, 1936	Pitcher	New York Giants, St. Louis Cardinals	
Chico Walker	September 2, 1980	October 3, 1993	Utility player	Boston Red Sox, Chicago Cubs, New York Mets	
Christian Walker	September 17, 2014		First baseman	Baltimore Orioles, Arizona Diamondbacks, Houston Astros	
Curt Walker	September 17, 1919	September 28, 1930	Outfielder	New York Giants, Philadelphia Phillies, Cincinnati Reds	
Dixie Walker (P)	September 17, 1909	May 29, 1912	Pitcher	Washington Senators	
Dixie Walker (OF)	April 28, 1931	September 22, 1949	Outfielder	New York Yankees, Detroit Tigers, Chicago White Sox, Brooklyn Dodgers, Pittsburgh Pirates	
Duane Walker	May 25, 1982	July 18, 1988	Outfielder	Cincinnati Reds, Texas Rangers, St. Louis Cardinals	
Ed Walker	September 26, 1902	June 21, 1903	Pitcher	Cleveland Bronchos/Naps	
Ernie Walker	April 13, 1913	July 6, 1915	Outfielder	St. Louis Browns	
Fleet Walker	May 1, 1884	September 4, 1884	Catcher	Toledo Blue Stockings	
Frank Walker	September 6, 1917	August 8, 1925	Outfielder	Detroit Tigers, Philadelphia Athletics, New York Giants	
Gee Walker	April 14, 1931	September 30, 1945	Outfielder	Detroit Tigers, Chicago White Sox, Washington Senators, Cleveland Indians, Cincinnati Reds	
George Walker	August 1, 1888	September 20, 1888	Pitcher	Baltimore Orioles (19th century)	
Greg Walker	September 18, 1982	July 1, 1990	First baseman	Chicago White Sox, Baltimore Orioles	
Harry Walker	September 25, 1940	August 19, 1955	Outfielder	St. Louis Cardinals, Philadelphia Phillies, Chicago Cubs, Cincinnati Reds	
Hub Walker	April 15, 1931	September 30, 1945	Outfielder	Detroit Tigers, Cincinnati Reds	
Jamie Walker	April 2, 1997	June 2, 2009	Pitcher	Kansas City Royals, Detroit Tigers, Baltimore Orioles	
Jeremy Walker	July 26, 2019	September 15, 2019	Pitcher	Atlanta Braves	
Jerry Walker	July 6, 1957	September 25, 1964	Pitcher	Baltimore Orioles, Kansas City Athletics, Cleveland Indians	
Johnny Walker	September 19, 1919	October 2, 1921	Catcher	Philadelphia Athletics	
Jordan Walker	March 30, 2023		Outfielder	St. Louis Cardinals	
Josh Walker	May 16, 2023		Pitcher	New York Mets, Toronto Blue Jays	
Kevin Walker	April 14, 2000	July 9, 2005	Pitcher	San Diego Padres, San Francisco Giants, Chicago White Sox	
Larry Walker β	August 16, 1989	October 2, 2005	Outfielder	Montreal Expos, Colorado Rockies, St. Louis Cardinals	
Luke Walker	December 7, 1965	October 1, 1974	Pitcher	Pittsburgh Pirates, Detroit Tigers	
Marty Walker	September 30, 1928	September 30, 1928	Pitcher	Philadelphia Phillies	
Mike A. Walker	June 16, 1992	July 6, 1992	Pitcher	Seattle Mariners	
Mike C. Walker	September 9, 1988	July 11, 1996	Pitcher	Cleveland Indians, Chicago Cubs, Detroit Tigers	
Mysterious Walker	June 28, 1910	September 29, 1915	Pitcher	Cincinnati Reds, Brooklyn Superbas, Pittsburgh Rebels, Brooklyn Tip-Tops	
Neil Walker	September 1, 2009	September 8, 2020	Third baseman	Pittsburgh Pirates, New York Mets, Milwaukee Brewers, New York Yankees, Miami Marlins, Philadelphia Phillies	
Oscar Walker	September 17, 1875	September 4, 1885	Utility player	Brooklyn Atlantics, Buffalo Bisons (NL), St. Louis Browns (1882–1900), Brooklyn Atlantics (1884), Baltimore Orioles (19th century)	
Pete Walker	June 7, 1995	July 7, 2006	Pitcher	New York Mets, San Diego Padres, Colorado Rockies, Toronto Blue Jays	
Roy Walker	September 16, 1912	July 4, 1922	Pitchers	Cleveland Naps/Indians, Chicago Cubs, St. Louis Cardinals	
Rube Walker	April 20, 1948	June 15, 1958	Catcher	Chicago Cubs, Brooklyn Dodgers, Los Angeles Dodgers	
Ryan Walker	May 21, 2023		Pitcher	San Francisco Giants	
Speed Walker	September 15, 1923	September 15, 1923	First baseman	St. Louis Cardinals	
Steele Walker	June 5, 2022	June 10, 2022	Outfielder	Texas Rangers	
Taijuan Walker	August 30, 2013		Pitcher	Seattle Mariners, Arizona Diamondbacks, Toronto Blue Jays, New York Mets, Philadelphia Phillies	
Tilly Walker	June 10, 1911	October 6, 1923	Outfielder	Washington Senators, St. Louis Browns, Boston Red Sox, Philadelphia Athletics	
Todd Walker	August 30, 1996	May 10, 2007	Second baseman	Minnesota Twins, Colorado Rockies, Cincinnati Reds, Boston Red Sox, Chicago Cubs, San Diego Padres, Oakland Athletics	
Tom Walker (1900s P)	September 27, 1902	September 30, 1905	Pitcher	Philadelphia Athletics, Cincinnati Reds	
Tom Walker (1970s P)	April 23, 1972	July 23, 1977	Pitcher	Montreal Expos, Detroit Tigers, St. Louis Cardinals, California Angels	
Tony Walker	April 8, 1986	October 4, 1986	Outfielder	Houston Astros	
Tyler Walker	July 2, 2002	June 19, 2010	Pitcher	New York Mets, San Francisco Giants, Tampa Bay Devil Rays, Philadelphia Phillies, Washington Nationals	
Walt Walker	May 8, 1884	May 8, 1884	Catcher	Detroit Wolverines	
Welday Walker	July 15, 1884	August 6, 1884	Outfielder	Toledo Blue Stockings	
Jim Walkup (LHP)	April 30, 1927	May 16, 1927	Pitcher	Detroit Tigers	
Jim Walkup (RHP)	September 22, 1934	July 18, 1939	Pitcher	St. Louis Browns, Detroit Tigers	
Donne Wall	September 2, 1995	June 11, 2002	Pitcher	Houston Astros, San Diego Padres, New York Mets, Anaheim Angels	
Forrest Wall	July 22, 2023		Outfielder	Atlanta Braves, Miami Marlins	
Howard Wall	September 13, 1873	September 13, 1873	Shortstop	Washington Blue Legs	
Joe Wall	September 22, 1901	August 24, 1902	Catcher	New York Giants, Brooklyn Superbas	
Josh Wall	July 22, 2012	April 19, 2014	Pitcher	Los Angeles Dodgers, Los Angeles Angels	
Murray Wall	July 4, 1950	July 25, 1959	Pitcher	Boston Braves, Boston Red Sox, Washington Senators	
Stan Wall	July 19, 1975	July 3, 1977	Pitcher	Los Angeles Dodgers	
Bobby Wallace β	September 15, 1894	September 2, 1918	Shortstop	Cleveland Spiders, St. Louis Cardinals, St. Louis Browns	
Brett Wallace	July 31, 2010	September 28, 2016	First baseman	Houston Astros, San Diego Padres	
Dave Wallace	July 18, 1973	May 19, 1978	Pitcher	Philadelphia Phillies, Toronto Blue Jays	
Derek Wallace	August 13, 1996	September 4, 1999	Pitcher	New York Mets, Kansas City Royals	
Doc Wallace	May 2, 1919	May 4, 1919	Shortstop	Philadelphia Phillies	
Don Wallace	April 12, 1967	June 3, 1967	Second baseman	California Angels	
Huck Wallace	June 5, 1912	July 1, 1912	Pitcher	Philadelphia Phillies	
Jack Wallace	September 27, 1915	September 30, 1915	Catcher	Chicago Cubs	
Jeff Wallace	August 21, 1997	October 3, 2001	Pitcher	Pittsburgh Pirates, Tampa Bay Devil Rays	
Jim Wallace	August 24, 1905	August 29, 1905	Outfielder	Pittsburgh Pirates	
Lefty Wallace	May 5, 1942	September 22, 1946	Pitcher	Boston Braves	
Mike Wallace	June 27, 1973	May 1, 1977	Pittsburgh	Philadelphia Phillies, New York Yankees, St. Louis Cardinals, Texas Rangers	
Chad Wallach	August 27, 2017		Catcher	Cincinnati Reds, Miami Marlins, Los Angeles Angels	
Tim Wallach	September 6, 1980	September 29, 1996	Third baseman	Montreal Expos, Los Angeles Dodgers, California Angels	
Jack Wallaesa	September 22, 1940	August 3, 1948	Shortstop	Philadelphia Athletics, Chicago White Sox	
Norm Wallen	April 20, 1945	April 24, 1945	Third baseman	Boston Braves	
Red Waller	April 27, 1909	April 27, 1909	Pitcher	New York Giants	
Tye Waller	September 6, 1980	May 13, 1987	Third baseman	St. Louis Cardinals, Chicago Cubs, Houston Astros	
Denny Walling	September 7, 1975	April 10, 1992	Utility player	Oakland Athletics, Houston Astros, St. Louis Cardinals, Texas Rangers	
Joe Wallis	September 2, 1975	September 30, 1979	Outfielder	Chicago Cubs, Oakland Athletics	
Matt Wallner	September 17, 2022		Outfielder	Minnesota Twins	
Lee Walls	April 21, 1952	October 4, 1964	Outfielder	Pittsburgh Pirates, Chicago Cubs, Cincinnati Reds, Philadelphia Phillies, Los Angeles Dodgers	
Taylor Walls	May 22, 2021		Shortstop	Tampa Bay Rays	
Les Walrond	June 8, 2003		Pitcher	Kansas City Royals, Chicago Cubs, Philadelphia Phillies	
Augie Walsh	October 2, 1927	September 27, 1928	Pitcher	Philadelphia Phillies	
Austin Walsh	April 19, 1914	October 8, 1918	Outfielder	Chicago Chi-Feds/Whales	
Connie Walsh	September 16, 1907	September 16, 1907	Pitcher	Pittsburgh Pirates	
Dave Walsh	August 13, 1990	October 2, 1990	Pitcher	Los Angeles Dodgers	
Dee Walsh	April 10, 1913	August 24, 1915	Utility player	St. Louis Browns	
Ed Walsh β	May 7, 1904	September 11, 1917	Pitcher	Chicago White Sox, Boston Braves	
Ed Walsh Jr.	July 4, 1928	September 25, 1932	Pitcher	Chicago White Sox	
Jim Walsh	August 25, 1921	September 4, 1921	Pitcher	Detroit Tigers	
Jimmy Walsh (IF)	April 25, 1910	September 29, 1915	Third baseman	Philadelphia Phillies, Baltimore Terrapins, St. Louis Terriers	
Jimmy Walsh (OF)	August 26, 1912	October 4, 1917	Outfielder	Philadelphia Athletics, New York Yankees, Boston Red Sox	
Joe Walsh (AA IF)	September 3, 1891	October 6, 1891	Utility infielder	Baltimore Orioles (19th century)	
Joe Walsh (C)	October 8, 1910	May 5, 1911	Catcher	New York Yankees	
Joe Walsh (NL IF)	July 1, 1938	July 3, 1938	Shortstop	Boston Bees	
John Walsh	June 22, 1903	June 22, 1903	Third baseman	Philadelphia Phillies	
Junior Walsh	September 14, 1946	September 9, 1951	Pitcher	Pittsburgh Pirates	
Tom Walsh	August 15, 1906	September 26, 1906	Catcher	Chicago Cubs	
Walt Walsh	May 4, 1920	May 5, 1920	Pinch runner	Philadelphia Phillies	
Bernie Walter	August 16, 1930	August 16, 1930	Pitcher	Pittsburgh Pirates	
Gene Walter	August 9, 1985	September 30, 1988	Pitcher	San Diego Padres, New York Mets, Seattle Mariners	
Bucky Walters	September 18, 1931	July 23, 1950	Pitcher	Boston Braves, Boston Red Sox, Philadelphia Phillies, Cincinnati Reds	
Charley Walters	April 11, 1969	May 14, 1969	Pitcher	Minnesota Twins	
Dan Walters	June 1, 1992	May 23, 1993	Catcher	San Diego Padres	
Fred Walters	April 17, 1945	August 9, 1945	Catcher	Boston Red Sox	
Ken Walters	April 12, 1960	September 29, 1963	Outfielder	Philadelphia Phillies, Cincinnati Reds	
Mike Walters	July 8, 1983	August 24, 1984	Pitcher	Minnesota Twins	
P. J. Walters	April 17, 2009		Pitcher	St. Louis Cardinals, Toronto Blue Jays	
Roxy Walters	September 16, 1915	June 29, 1925	Catcher	New York Yankees, Boston Red Sox, Cleveland Indians	
Bruce Walton	May 11, 1991	July 4, 1994	Pitcher	Oakland Athletics, Montreal Expos, Colorado Rockies	
Danny Walton	April 20, 1968	June 6, 1980	Outfielder	Houston Astros, Seattle Pilots, Milwaukee Brewers, New York Yankees, Minnesota Twins, Los Angeles Dodgers, Texas Rangers	
Jerome Walton	April 4, 1989	May 6, 1998	Outfielder	Chicago Cubs, California Angels, Cincinnati Reds, Atlanta Braves, Baltimore Orioles, Tampa Bay Devil Rays	
Reggie Walton	June 13, 1980	June 6, 1982	Outfielder	Seattle Mariners, Pittsburgh Pirates	
Bill Wambsganss	August 4, 1914	September 27, 1926	Second baseman	Cleveland Naps/Indians, Boston Red Sox, Philadelphia Athletics	
Lloyd Waner β	April 12, 1927	September 16, 1945	Outfielder	Pittsburgh Pirates, Boston Braves, Cincinnati Reds, Philadelphia Phillies, Brooklyn Dodgers	
Paul Waner β	April 13, 1926	April 26, 1945	Outfielder	Pittsburgh Pirates, Brooklyn Dodgers, Boston Braves, New York Yankees	
Chien-Ming Wang	April 30, 2005		Pitcher	New York Yankees, Washington Nationals	
Jack Wanner	September 28, 1909	October 2, 1909	Shortstop	New York Highlanders	
Pee-Wee Wanninger	April 22, 1925	June 27, 1927	Shortstop	New York Yankees, Boston Red Sox, Cincinnati Reds	
Dick Wantz	April 13, 1965	April 13, 1965	Pitcher	California Angels	
Steve Wapnick	April 14, 1990	October 4, 1991	Pitcher	Detroit Tigers, Chicago White Sox	
Aaron Ward	August 14, 1917	June 7, 1928	Second baseman	New York Yankees, Chicago White Sox, Cleveland Indians	
Bryan Ward	July 3, 1998	September 30, 2000	Pitcher	Chicago White Sox, Philadelphia Phillies, Anaheim Angels	
Chris Ward	September 10, 1972	October 1, 1974	Outfielder	Chicago Cubs	
Chuck Ward	April 11, 1917	September 24, 1922	Shortstop	Pittsburgh Pirates, Brooklyn Dodgers	
Colby Ward	July 27, 1990	September 27, 1990	Pitchers	Cleveland Indians	
Colin Ward	September 21, 1985	October 6, 1985	Pitcher	San Francisco Giants	
Daryle Ward	May 14, 1998		Utility player	Houston Astros, Los Angeles Dodgers, Pittsburgh Pirates, Washington Nationals, Atlanta Braves, Chicago Cubs	
Dick Ward	May 3, 1934	July 23, 1935	Pitcher	Chicago Cubs, St. Louis Cardinals	
Duane Ward	April 12, 1986	June 22, 1995	Pitcher	Atlanta Braves, Toronto Blue Jays	
Gary Ward	September 3, 1979	October 3, 1990	Outfielder	Minnesota Twins, Texas Rangers, New York Yankees, Detroit Tigers	
Hap Ward	May 18, 1912	May 18, 1912	Outfielder	Detroit Tigers	
Jay Ward	May 6, 1963	June 7, 1970	Utility player	Minnesota Twins, Cincinnati Reds	
Jim Ward	August 3, 1876	August 3, 1876	Catcher	Philadelphia Athletics (1860–76)	
Joe Ward	April 24, 1906	July 7, 1910	Utility infielder	Philadelphia Phillies, New York Yankees	
John Ward	May 23, 1884	May 23, 1884	Outfielder	Washington Nationals (UA)	
John Ward	September 19, 1885	September 19, 1885	Pitcher	Providence Grays	
John Montgomery Ward β	July 15, 1878	September 29, 1894	Utility player	Providence Grays, New York Gothams/Giants, Brooklyn Ward's Wonders, Brooklyn Grooms	
Kevin Ward	May 10, 1991	October 4, 1992	Outfielder	San Diego Padres	
Pete Ward	September 21, 1962	September 25, 1970	Third baseman	Baltimore Orioles, Chicago White Sox, New York Yankees	
Piggy Ward	June 12, 1883	September 30, 1894	Utility player	Philadelphia Quakers, Pittsburgh Pirates, Baltimore Orioles (19th century), Cincinnati Reds, Washington Senators (1891–99)	
Preston Ward	April 20, 1948	August 18, 1959	First baseman	Brooklyn Dodgers, Chicago Cubs, Pittsburgh Pirates, Cleveland Indians, Kansas City Athletics	
Rube Ward	April 28, 1902	August 14, 1902	Outfielder	Brooklyn Superbas	
Turner Ward	September 10, 1990	July 27, 2001	Outfielder	Cleveland Indians, Toronto Blue Jays, Milwaukee Brewers, Pittsburgh Pirates, Arizona Diamondbacks, Philadelphia Phillies	
Jon Warden	April 11, 1968	September 28, 1968	Pitcher	Detroit Tigers	
Curt Wardle	August 30, 1984	October 5, 1985	Pitcher	Minnesota Twins, Cleveland Indians	
Jeff Ware	September 2, 1995	July 7, 1996	Pitcher	Toronto Blue Jays	
Buzzy Wares	September 15, 1913	September 27, 1914	Shortstop	St. Louis Browns	
Jack Warhop	September 19, 1908	August 12, 1915	Pitcher	New York Highlanders/Yankees	
Cy Warmoth	August 31, 1916	October 3, 1923	Pitcher	St. Louis Cardinals, Washington Senators	
Lon Warneke	April 18, 1930	September 29, 1945	Pitcher	Chicago Cubs, St. Louis Cardinals	
Ed Warner	July 2, 1912	August 26, 1912	Pitcher	Pittsburgh Pirates	
Fred Warner	April 21, 1875	September 11, 1884	Third baseman	Philadelphia Centennials, Philadelphia Athletics (1860–76), Indianapolis Blues, Cleveland Blues (NL), Philadelphia Quakers, Brooklyn Atlantics (1884)	
Hooks Warner	August 21, 1916	June 17, 1921	Third baseman	Pittsburgh Pirates, Chicago Cubs	
Jack Warner (C)	April 23, 1895	September 30, 1908	Catcher	Boston Beaneaters, Louisville Colonels, New York Giants, Boston Americans, St. Louis Cardinals, Detroit Tigers, Washington Senators	
Jack Warner (3B)	September 24, 1925	September 30, 1933	Third baseman	Detroit Tigers, Brooklyn Robins, Philadelphia Phillies	
Jack Warner (P)	April 10, 1962	June 27, 1965	Pitcher	Chicago Cubs	
Jackie Warner	April 12, 1966	July 27, 1966	Outfielder	California Angels	
Hal Warnock	September 2, 1935	September 18, 1935	Outfielder	St. Louis Browns	
Bennie Warren	September 13, 1939	September 28, 1947	Catcher	Philadelphia Phillies, New York Giants	
Bill Warren	April 30, 1914	May 23, 1915	Catcher	Indianapolis Hoosiers (FL)/Newark Peppers	
Mike Warren	June 12, 1983	July 2, 1985	Pitcher	Oakland Athletics	
Tommy Warren	April 18, 1944	September 3, 1944	Pitcher	Brooklyn Dodgers	
Rabbit Warstler	July 24, 1930	September 29, 1940	Utility infielder	Boston Red Sox, Philadelphia Athletics, Boston Bees, Chicago Cubs	
Dan Warthen	May 18, 1975	September 29, 1978	Pitcher	Montreal Expos, Philadelphia Phillies, Houston Astros	
Bill Warwick	July 18, 1921	September 26, 1926	Catcher	Pittsburgh Pirates, St. Louis Cardinals	
Carl Warwick	April 11, 1961	June 12, 1966	Outfielder	Brooklyn Dodgers, St. Louis Cardinals, Houston Colt .45s, Baltimore Orioles, Chicago Cubs	
Jimmy Wasdell	September 3, 1937	April 18, 1947	Outfielder	Washington Senators, Brooklyn Dodgers, Pittsburgh Pirates, Philadelphia Blue Jays/Phillies, Cleveland Indians	
John Wasdin	August 24, 1995	July 7, 2007	Pitcher	Oakland Athletics, Boston Red Sox, Colorado Rockies, Baltimore Orioles, Toronto Blue Jays, Texas Rangers, Pittsburgh Pirates	
Link Wasem	May 5, 1937	May 23, 1937	Catcher	Boston Bees	
George Washburn	May 4, 1941	May 4, 1941	Pitcher	New York Yankees	
Greg Washburn	June 7, 1969	September 21, 1969	Pitcher	California Angels	
Jarrod Washburn	June 2, 1998	September 15, 2009	Pitcher	Anaheim Angels/Los Angeles Angels of Anaheim, Seattle Mariners, Detroit Tigers	
Libe Washburn	May 30, 1902	July 17, 1903	Pitcher	Philadelphia Phillies	
Ray Washburn	September 20, 1961	October 1, 1970	Pitcher	St. Louis Cardinals, Cincinnati Reds	
Buck Washer	April 25, 1904	April 25, 1904	Pitcher	Philadelphia Phillies	
Claudell Washington	July 5, 1974	June 18, 1990	Outfielder	Oakland Athletics, Texas Rangers, Chicago White Sox, New York Mets, Atlanta Braves, New York Yankees, California Angels	
George Washington	April 17, 1935	June 11, 1936	Outfielder	Chicago White Sox	
Herb Washington	April 4, 1974	May 4, 1975	Pinch runner	Oakland Athletics	
La Rue Washington	September 7, 1978	September 30, 1979	Outfielder	Texas Rangers	
Rico Washington	April 1, 2008		Third baseman	St. Louis Cardinals	
Ron Washington	September 10, 1977	July 7, 1989	Shortstop	Los Angeles Dodgers, Minnesota Twins, Baltimore Orioles, Cleveland Indians, Houston Astros	
U L Washington	September 6, 1977	October 4, 1987	Shortstop	Kansas City Royals, Montreal Expos, Pittsburgh Pirates	
Mark Wasinger	May 27, 1986	April 21, 1988	Third baseman	San Diego Padres, San Francisco Giants	
Gary Waslewski	June 11, 1967	September 28, 1972	Pitcher	Boston Red Sox, St. Louis Cardinals, Montreal Expos, New York Yankees, Oakland Athletics	
Ehren Wassermann	July 20, 2007		Pitcher	Chicago White Sox	
B. J. Waszgis	July 29, 2000	October 1, 2000	Catcher	Texas Rangers	
Steve Waterbury	September 14, 1976	September 27, 1976	Pitcher	St. Louis Cardinals	
Fred Waterman	May 5, 1871	September 23, 1875	Third baseman	Washington Olympics, Washington Blue Legs, Chicago White Stockings	
Chris Waters	August 5, 2008		Pitcher	Baltimore Orioles	
Fred Waters	September 20, 1955	September 23, 1956	Pitcher	Pittsburgh Pirates	
Dusty Wathan	September 24, 2002	September 29, 2002	Catcher	Kansas City Royals	
John Wathan	May 26, 1976	October 6, 1985	Catcher	Kansas city Royals	
Bill Watkins	August 1, 1884	October 13, 1884	Third baseman	Indianapolis Hoosiers (AA)	
Bob Watkins	September 6, 1969	September 26, 1969	Pitcher	Houston Astros	
Dave Watkins	April 9, 1969	September 2, 1969	Catcher	Philadelphia Phillies	
Ed Watkins	September 6, 1902	September 6, 1902	Outfielder	Philadelphia Phillies	
George Watkins	April 15, 1930	September 27, 1936	Outfielder	St. Louis Cardinals, New York Giants, Philadelphia Phillies, Brooklyn Dodgers	
Pat Watkins	September 9, 1997	May 1, 1999	Outfielder	Cincinnati Reds, Colorado Rockies	
Scott Watkins	August 1, 1995	September 30, 1995	Pitcher	Minnesota Twins	
Steve Watkins	August 21, 2004	October 2, 2004	Pitcher	San Diego Padres	
Tommy Watkins	August 10, 2007	August 22, 2007	Third baseman	Minnesota Twins	
Neal Watlington	July 10, 1953	September 17, 1953	Catcher	Philadelphia Athletics	
Allen Watson	July 8, 1993	August 10, 2000	Pitcher	St. Louis Cardinals, San Francisco Giants, Anaheim Angels, New York Mets, Seattle Mariners, New York Yankees	
Art Watson	May 19, 1914	August 7, 1915	Catcher	Brooklyn Tip-Tops, Buffalo Blues	
Bob Watson	September 9, 1966	September 30, 1984	First baseman	Houston Astros, Boston Red Sox, New York Yankees, Atlanta Braves	
Brandon Watson	August 9, 2005		Outfielder	Washington Nationals, Cincinnati Reds	
Doc Watson	September 3, 1913	September 21, 1915	Pitcher	Chicago Cubs, Chicago Chi-Feds, St. Louis Terriers	
Johnny Watson	September 26, 1930	September 28, 1930	Shortstop	Detroit Tigers	
Mark Watson	May 19, 2000	August 21, 2003	Pitcher	Cleveland Indians, Seattle Mariners, Cincinnati Reds	
Matt Watson	September 12, 2003		Outfielder	New York Mets, Oakland Athletics	
Milt Watson	June 26, 1916	June 16, 1919	Pitcher	St. Louis Cardinals, Philadelphia Phillies	
Mother Watson	May 19, 1887	May 27, 1887	Pitcher	Cincinnati Red Stockings (AA)	
Mule Watson	July 4, 1918	September 18, 1924	Pitcher	Philadelphia Athletics, Boston Braves, Pittsburgh Pirates, New York Giants	
Tony Watson	June 8, 2011		Pitcher	Pittsburgh Pirates	
Allie Watt	October 3, 1920	October 3, 1920	Second baseman	Washington Senators	
Eddie Watt	April 12, 1966	June 14, 1975	Pitcher	Baltimore Orioles, Philadelphia Phillies, Chicago Cubs	
Frank Watt	April 14, 1931	September 27, 1931	Pitcher	Philadelphia Phillies	
Johnny Watwood	April 16, 1929	May 29, 1939	Outfielder	Chicago White Sox, Boston Red Sox, Philadelphia Phillies	
Jim Waugh	April 19, 1952	September 26, 1953	Pitcher	Pittsburgh Pirates	
Bob Way	April 12, 1927	May 15, 1927	Second baseman	Chicago White Sox	
Frank Wayenberg	August 25, 1924	August 28, 1924	Pitcher	Cleveland Indians	
Gary Wayne	April 7, 1989	June 3, 1994	Pitcher	Minnesota Twins, Colorado Rockies, Los Angeles Dodgers	
Justin Wayne	September 3, 2002	July 25, 2004	Pitcher	Florida Marlins	
Ken Weafer	May 29, 1936	May 29, 1936	Pitcher	Boston Bees	
Roy Weatherly	June 27, 1936	October 1, 1950	Outfielder	Cleveland Indians, New York Yankees, New York Giants	
David Weathers	August 2, 1991	October 3, 2009	Pitcher	Toronto Blue Jays, Florida Marlins, New York Yankees, Cleveland Indians, Milwaukee Brewers, Chicago Cubs, New York Mets, Houston Astros, Cincinnati Reds	
Art Weaver	September 14, 1902	August 8, 1908	Catcher	St. Louis Cardinals, Pittsburgh Pirates, St. Louis Browns, Chicago White Sox	
Buck Weaver	April 11, 1912	September 27, 1920	Shortstop	Chicago White Sox	
Eric Weaver	May 30, 1998	August 17, 2000	Pitcher	Los Angeles Dodgers, Seattle Mariners, Anaheim Angels	
Farmer Weaver	September 16, 1888	September 29, 1894	Outfielder	Louisville Colonels, Pittsburgh Pirates	
Floyd Weaver	September 30, 1962	September 26, 1971	Pitcher	Cleveland Indians, Chicago White Sox, Milwaukee Brewers	
Harry Weaver	September 18, 1915	May 4, 1919	Pitcher	Philadelphia Athletics, Chicago Cubs	
Jeff Weaver	April 14, 1999	September 29, 2010	Pitcher	Detroit Tigers, New York Yankees, Los Angeles Dodgers, Los Angeles Angels of Anaheim, St. Louis Cardinals, Seattle Mariners	
Jered Weaver	May 27, 2006		Pitcher	Los Angeles Angels of Anaheim	
Jim Weaver (RHP)	August 27, 1928	May 8, 1939	Pitcher	Washington Senators, New York Yankees, St. Louis Browns, Chicago Cubs, Pittsburgh Pirates, Cincinnati Reds	
Jim Weaver (LHP)	August 13, 1967	June 29, 1968	Pitcher	California Angels	
Jim Weaver (OF)	April 10, 1985	September 30, 1989	Outfielder	Detroit Tigers, Seattle Mariners, San Francisco Giants	
Monte Weaver	September 20, 1931	July 4, 1939	Pitcher	Washington Senators, Boston Red Sox	
Orlie Weaver	September 14, 1910	October 9, 1911	Pitcher	Chicago Cubs, Boston Rustlers	
Roger Weaver	June 6, 1980	October 4, 1980	Pitcher	Detroit Tigers	
Sam Weaver	October 25, 1875	May 29, 1886	Pitcher	Philadelphia White Stockings, Milwaukee Grays, Philadelphia Athletics (American Association), Louisville Eclipse, Philadelphia Keystones	
Bill Webb (2B)	September 17, 1917	October 1, 1917	Second baseman	Pittsburgh Pirates	
Bill Webb (P)	May 15, 1943	May 15, 1943	Pitcher	Philadelphia Blue Jays	
Brandon Webb	April 22, 2003		Pitcher	Arizona Diamondbacks	
Earl Webb	August 13, 1925	October 1, 1933	Outfielder	New York Giants, Chicago Cubs, Boston Red Sox, Detroit Tigers, Chicago White Sox	
Hank Webb	September 5, 1972	October 2, 1977	Pitcher	New York Mets, Los Angeles Dodgers	
John Webb	August 2, 2004	April 20, 2005	Pitcher	Tampa Bay Devil Rays	
Lefty Webb	May 23, 1910	August 5, 1910	Pitcher	Pittsburgh Pirates	
Red Webb	September 15, 1948	July 22, 1949	Pitcher	New York Giants	
Ryan Webb	July 8, 2009		Pitcher	San Diego Padres, Florida Marlins	
Skeeter Webb	July 20, 1932	August 31, 1948	Utility infielder	St. Louis Cardinals, Cleveland Indians, Chicago White Sox, Detroit Tigers, Philadelphia Athletics	
Les Webber	May 17, 1942	April 26, 1948	Pitcher	Brooklyn Dodgers, Cleveland Indians	
Ben Weber	April 3, 2000	May 8, 2005	Pitcher	San Francisco Giants, Anaheim Angels, Cincinnati Reds	
Charlie Weber	July 30, 1898	July 30, 1898	Pitcher	Washington Senators (1891–99)	
Harry Weber	July 22, 1884	July 31, 1884	Catcher	Indianapolis Hoosiers (AA)	
Joe Weber	May 30, 1884	July 31, 1884	Outfielder	Detroit Wolverines	
Neil Weber	September 11, 1998	September 27, 1998	Pitcher	Arizona Diamondbacks	
Lenny Webster	September 1, 1989	September 23, 1900	Catcher	Minnesota Twins, Montreal Expos, Philadelphia Phillies, Baltimore Orioles, Boston Red Sox	
Mitch Webster	September 2, 1983	October 1, 1995	Outfielder	Toronto Blue Jays, Montreal Expos, Chicago Cubs, Cleveland Indians, Pittsburgh Pirates, Los Angeles Dodgers	
Ray Webster (2B)	April 17, 1959	May 15, 1960	Second baseman	Cleveland Indians, Boston Red Sox	
Ray Webster (1B)	April 11, 1967	August 22, 1971	First baseman	Kansas City/Oakland Athletics, San Diego Padres, Chicago Cubs	
Pete Weckbecker	October 8, 1889	October 12, 1890	Catcher	Indianapolis Hoosiers (NL), Louisville Colonels	-
Eric Wedge	October 5, 1991	July 29, 1994	Catcher	Boston Red Sox, Colorado Rockies	
Bert Weeden	June 4, 1911	June 4, 1911	Pinch hitter	Boston Rustlers	
Johnny Weekly	April 13, 1962	April 23, 1964	Outfielder	Houston Colt .45s	
Jemile Weeks	June 7, 2011		Second baseman	Oakland Athletics	
Rickie Weeks	September 15, 2003		Second baseman	Milwaukee Brewers	
Mike Wegener	April 9, 1969	September 26, 1970	Pitcher	Montreal Expos	
Bill Wegman	September 14, 1985	October 1, 1995	Pitcher	Milwaukee Brewers	
Biggs Wehde	September 15, 1930	August 3, 1931	Pitcher	Chicago White Sox	
Herm Wehmeier	September 7, 1945	July 23, 1958	Pitcher	Cincinnati Reds/Redlegs, Philadelphia Phillies, St. Louis Cardinals, Detroit Tigers	
John Wehner	July 17, 1991	July 27, 2001	Utility player	Pittsburgh Pirates, Florida Marlins	
Dave Wehrmeister	April 16, 1976	October 4, 1985	Pitcher	San Diego Padres, New York Yankees, Philadelphia Phillies, Chicago White Sox	
Stump Weidman	August 26, 1880	July 5, 1888	Pitcher	Buffalo Bisons (NL), Detroit Wolverines, Kansas City Cowboys (NL), New York Metropolitans, New York Giants	
Ralph Weigel	September 18, 1946	July 7, 1949	Catcher	Cleveland Indians, Chicago White Sox, Washington Senators	
Podge Weihe	August 6, 1883	September 25, 1884	Outfielder	Cincinnati Red Stockings (AA), Indianapolis Hoosiers (AA)	
Dick Weik	September 8, 1948	July 5, 1954	Pitchers	Washington Senators, Cleveland Indians, Detroit Tigers	
Bob Weiland	September 30, 1928	April 26, 1940	Pitcher	Chicago White Sox, Boston Red Sox, Cleveland Indians, St. Louis Browns, St. Louis Cardinals	
Ed Weiland	May 1, 1940	September 22, 1942	Pitcher	Chicago White Sox	
Kyle Weiland	July 10, 2011		Pitcher	Boston Red Sox	
Carl Weilman	August 24, 1912	September 29, 1920	Pitcher	St. Louis Browns	
Jake Weimer	April 17, 1903	May 28, 1909	Pitcher	Chicago Cubs, Cincinnati Reds, New York Giants	
Lefty Weinert	September 24, 1919	June 29, 1931	Pitcher	Philadelphia Phillies, Chicago Cubs, New York Yankees	
Elmer Weingartner	April 19, 1945	September 28, 1945	Shortstop	Cleveland Indians	
Robbie Weinhardt	July 7, 2010		Pitcher	Detroit Tigers	
Phil Weintraub	September 5, 1933	August 5, 1945	First baseman	New York Giants, Cincinnati Reds, Philadelphia Phillies	
Roy Weir	June 25, 1936	October 1, 1939	Pitcher	Boston Bees	
Al Weis	September 15, 1962	June 23, 1971	Second baseman	Chicago White Sox, New York Mets	
Butch Weis	April 15, 1922	October 2, 1925	Outfielder	Chicago Cubs	
Bud Weiser	April 29, 1915	October 5, 1916	Outfielder	Philadelphia Phillies	
Gary Weiss	September 13, 1980	October 4, 1981	Shortstop	Los Angeles Dodgers	
Joe Weiss	August 29, 1915	October 3, 1915	First baseman	Chicago Whales	
Walt Weiss	July 12, 1987	October 1, 2000	Shortstop	Oakland Athletics, Florida Marlins, Colorado Rockies, Atlanta Braves	
Johnny Welaj	May 2, 1939	September 27, 1943	Outfielder	Washington Senators, Philadelphia Athletics	
Bob Welch	June 20, 1978	August 11, 1994	Pitcher	Los Angeles Dodgers, Oakland Athletics	
Curt Welch	May 1, 1884	May 23, 1893	Outfielder	Toledo Blue Stockings, St. Louis Browns (1882–1900), Philadelphia Athletics (American Association), Baltimore Orioles (19th century), Cincinnati Reds, Louisville Colonels	
Frank Welch	September 9, 1919	August 11, 1927	Outfielder	Philadelphia Athletics, Boston Red Sox	
Herb Welch	September 15, 1925	October 1, 1925	Shortstop	Boston Red Sox	
Johnny Welch	May 22, 1926	August 26, 1936	Pitcher	Chicago Cubs, Boston Red Sox, Pittsburgh Pirates	
Mickey Welch β	May 1, 1880	May 17, 1892	Pitcher	Troy Trojans, New York Gothams/Giants	
Mike Welch	July 7, 1998	September 27, 1998	Pitcher	Philadelphia Phillies	
Milt Welch	June 5, 1945	June 5, 1945	Catcher	Detroit Tigers	
Ted Welch	May 15, 1914	June 25, 1914	Pitcher	Sr. Louis Terriers	
Tub Welch	June 12, 1890	August 16, 1895	Catcher	Toledo Maumees, Louisville Colonels	
Don Welchel	September 15, 1982	May 31, 1983	Pitcher	Baltimore Orioles	
Harry Welchonce	April 17, 1911	June 10, 1911	Outfielder	Philadelphia Phillies	
Mike Welday	April 21, 1907	July 8, 1909	Outfielder	Chicago White Sox	
Ollie Welf	August 30, 1916	August 30, 1916	Pinch runner	Cleveland Indians	
Todd Wellemeyer	May 15, 2003		Pitcher	Chicago Cubs, Florida Marlins, Kansas City Royals, St. Louis Cardinals, San Francisco Giants	
Bob Wellman	September 23, 1948	June 3, 1950	Utility player	Philadelphia Athletics	
Brad Wellman	September 4, 1982	October 1, 1989	Second baseman	San Francisco Giants, Los Angeles Dodgers, Kansas City Royals	
Bob Wells	May 16, 1994	September 29, 2002	Pitcher	Philadelphia Phillies, Seattle Mariners, Minnesota Twins	
Casper Wells	May 15, 2010		Outfielder	Detroit Tigers, Seattle Mariners	
David Wells	June 30, 1987	September 27, 2007	Pitcher	Toronto Blue Jays, Detroit Tigers, Cincinnati Reds, Baltimore Orioles, New York Yankees, Chicago White Sox, San Diego Padres, Boston Red Sox, Los Angeles Dodgers	
Ed Wells	June 16, 1923	September 17, 1934	Pitcher	Detroit Tigers, New York Yankees, St. Louis Browns	
Greg Wells	August 10, 1981	October 3, 1982	First baseman	Toronto Blue Jays, Minnesota Twins	
Jake Wells	August 10, 1888	August 19, 1890	Catcher	Detroit Wolverines, St. Louis Browns (1882–1900)	
Jared Wells	May 24, 2008		Pitcher	San Diego Padres	
John Wells	September 14, 1944	September 28, 1944	Pitcher	Brooklyn Dodgers	
Kip Wells	August 2, 1999		Pitcher	Chicago White Sox, Pittsburgh Pirates, Texas Rangers, St. Louis Cardinals, Colorado Rockies, Kansas City Royals, Washington Nationals, Cincinnati Reds	
Leo Wells	April 16, 1942	August 20, 1946	Third baseman	Chicago White Sox	
Randy Wells	April 5, 2008		Pitcher	Toronto Blue Jays, Chicago Cubs	
Terry Wells	July 3, 1990	July 27, 1990	Pitcher	Los Angeles Dodgers	
Vernon Wells	August 30, 1999		Outfielder	Toronto Blue Jays, Los Angeles Angels of Anaheim	
Chris Welsh	April 12, 1981	October 5, 1986	Pitcher	San Diego Padres, Montreal Expos, Texas Rangers, Cincinnati Reds	
Jimmy Welsh	April 14, 1925	September 28, 1930	Outfielder	Boston Braves, New York Giants	
Dick Welteroth	May 16, 1948	June 15, 1950	Pitcher	Washington Senators	
Tony Welzer	April 13, 1926	September 21, 1927	Pitcher	Boston Red Sox	
Lew Wendell	June 10, 1915	May 22, 1926	Catcher	New York Giants, Philadelphia Phillies	
Turk Wendell	June 17, 1991	May 13, 2004	Pitcher	Chicago Cubs, New York Mets	
Don Wengert	April 30, 1995	May 26, 2001	Pitcher	Oakland Athletics, San Diego Padres, Chicago Cubs, Kansas City Royals, Atlanta Braves, Pittsburgh Pirates	
Charley Wensloff	May 2, 1943	May 4, 1948	Pitcher	New York Yankees, Cleveland Indians	
Jack Wentz	April 15, 1891	April 15, 1891	Second baseman	Louisville Colonels	
Stan Wentzel	September 23, 1945	September 30, 1945	Outfielder	Boston Braves	
Fred Wenz	June 4, 1968	September 29, 1970	Pitcher	Boston Red Sox, Philadelphia Phillies	
Julie Wera	April 14, 1927	October 6, 1929	Third baseman	New York Yankees	
Billy Werber	June 25, 1930	September 5, 1942	Third baseman	New York Yankees, Boston Red Sox, Philadelphia Athletics, Cincinnati Reds, New York Giants	
Perry Werden	April 24, 1884	October 3, 1897	First baseman	St. Louis Maroons, Washington Nationals (1886–1889), Toledo Blue Stockings, Baltimore Orioles (19th century), St. Louis Browns (1882–1900), Louisville Colonels	
Johnny Werhas	April 14, 1964	September 30, 1967	Third baseman	Los Angeles Dodgers, California Angels	
Bill Werle	April 22, 1949	June 20, 1954	Pitcher	Pittsburgh Pirates, St. Louis Cardinals, Boston Red Sox	
George Werley	September 29, 1956	September 29, 1956	Pitcher	Baltimore Orioles	
Don Werner	September 2, 1975	September 19, 1982	Catcher	Cincinnati Reds, Texas Rangers	
Joe Werrick	September 27, 1884	October 14, 1888	Third baseman	St. Paul Saints, Louisville Colonels	
Don Wert	May 11, 1963	June 11, 1971	Third baseman	Detroit Tigers, Washington Senators (1961–1971)	
Dennis Werth	September 17, 1979	September 27, 1982	First baseman	New York Yankees, Kansas City Royals	
Jayson Werth	September 1, 2002		Outfielder	Toronto Blue Jays, Los Angeles Dodgers, Philadelphia Phillies, Washington Nationals	
Johnny Werts	April 14, 1926	May 22, 1929	Pitcher	Boston Braves	
Bill Wertz	May 22, 1993	May 26, 1994	Pitcher	Cleveland Indians	
Del Wertz	May 23, 1914	May 26, 1914	Shortstop	Buffalo Buffeds	
Vic Wertz	April 15, 1947	September 19, 1963	Utility player	Detroit Tigers, St. Louis Browns/Baltimore Orioles, Cleveland Indians, Boston Red Sox, Detroit Tigers, Minnesota Twins	
Jim Wessinger	August 4, 1979	September 24, 1979	Second baseman	Atlanta Braves	
Barry Wesson	July 15, 2002	September 28, 2003	Outfielder	Houston Astros, Anaheim Angels	
Billy West	May 22, 1874	September 9, 1876	Second baseman	Brooklyn Atlantics, New York Mutuals	
Buck West	August 24, 1884	September 18, 1890	Outfielder	Cincinnati Red Stockings (AA), Cleveland Spiders	
David West	September 24, 1988	September 4, 1998	Pitcher	New York Mets, Minnesota Twins, Philadelphia Phillies, Boston Red Sox	
Dick West	September 28, 1938	May 9, 1943	Catcher	Cincinnati Reds	
Frank West	July 11, 1894	July 11, 1894	Pitcher	Boston Beaneaters	
Hi West	September 8, 1905	July 2, 1911	Pitcher	Cleveland Naps	
Lefty West	April 30, 1944	September 15, 1945	Pitcher	St. Louis Browns	
Max West (1920s)	September 18, 1928	October 5, 1929	Outfielder	Brooklyn Robins	
Max West (1940s)	April 19, 1938	October 1, 1948	Outfielder	Boston Braves, Cincinnati Reds, Pittsburgh Pirates	
Sam West	April 17, 1927	September 24, 1942	Outfielder	Washington Senators, St. Louis Browns, Chicago White Sox	
Sean West	May 23, 2009		Pitcher	Florida Marlins	
Jake Westbrook	June 17, 2000		Pitcher	New York Yankees, Cleveland Indians, St. Louis Cardinals	
Oscar Westerberg	September 5, 1907	September 7, 1907	Shortstop	Boston Doves	
Huyler Westervelt	April 21, 1894	August 11, 1894	Pitcher	New York Giants	
Jim Westlake	April 16, 1955	April 16, 1955	Pinch hitter	Philadelphia Phillies	
Wally Westlake	April 15, 1947	May 12, 1956	Outfielder	Pittsburgh Pirates, St. Louis Cardinals, Cincinnati Reds, Cleveland Indians, Baltimore Orioles, Philadelphia Phillies	
Al Weston	July 7, 1929	July 8, 1929	Pinch hitter	Boston Braves	
Mickey Weston	June 18, 1989	May 9, 1993	Pitcher	Baltimore Orioles, Toronto Blue Jays, Philadelphia Phillies, New York Mets	
Wes Westrum	September 17, 1947	September 29, 1957	Catcher	New York Giants	
Jeff Wetherby	June 7, 1989	October 1, 1989	Outfielder	Atlanta Braves	
John Wetteland	May 31, 1989	September 20, 2000	Pitcher	Los Angeles Dodgers, Montreal Expos, New York Yankees, Texas Rangers	
Buzz Wetzel	July 25, 1927	July 28, 1927	Pitcher	Philadelphia Athletics	
Dutch Wetzel	September 15, 1920	October 2, 1921	Outfielder	St. Louis Browns	
George Wetzel	August 8, 1885	September 2, 1885	Pitcher	Baltimore Orioles (19th century)	
Stefan Wever	September 17, 1982	September 17, 1982	Pitcher	New York Yankees	
Gus Weyhing	May 2, 1887	August 21, 1901	Pitcher	Philadelphia Athletics (American Association), Brooklyn Ward's Wonders, Philadelphia Phillies, Pittsburgh Pirates, Louisville Colonels, Washington Senators (1891–99), St. Louis Cardinals, Brooklyn Superbas, Cleveland Blues (AL), Cincinnati Reds	
John Weyhing	July 13, 1888	April 20, 1889	Pitcher	Cincinnati Red Stockings (AA), Columbus Solons	
Bill Whaley	April 16, 1923	October 6, 1923	Outfielder	St. Louis Browns	
Bert Whaling	April 22, 1913	October 7, 1915	Catcher	Boston Braves	
Lee Wheat	April 21, 1954	April 23, 1955	Pitcher	Philadelphia/Kansas City Athletics	
Mack Wheat	April 14, 1915	June 6, 1921	Catcher	Brooklyn Robins, Philadelphia Phillies	
Zack Wheat β	September 11, 1909	September 21, 1927	Outfielder	Brooklyn Superbas/Robins, Philadelphia Athletics	
Charlie Wheatley	September 6, 1912	October 6, 1912	Pitcher	Detroit Tigers	
Woody Wheaton	September 28, 1943	August 17, 1944	Outfielder/Pitcher	Philadelphia Athletics	
Dan Wheeler	September 1, 1999		Pitcher	Tampa Bay Devil Rays, New York Mets, Houston Astros, Tampa Bay Rays, Boston Red Sox	
Dick Wheeler	June 17, 1918	June 17, 1918	Outfielder	St. Louis Cardinals	
Don Wheeler	April 23, 1949	October 2, 1949	Catcher	Chicago White Sox	
Ed Wheeler (1900s IF)	May 10, 1902	September 30, 1902	Utility infielder	Brooklyn Superbas	
Ed Wheeler (1940s IF)	April 19, 1945	September 22, 1945	Utility infielder	Cleveland Indians	
George Wheeler (P)	September 18, 1896	May 30, 1899	Pitcher	Philadelphia Phillies	
George Wheeler (PH)	July 27, 1910	August 3, 1910	Pinch hitter	Cincinnati Reds	
Harry Wheeler	June 19, 1878	October 15, 1884	Outfielder	Providence Grays, Cincinnati Reds (1876–1880), Cleveland Blues (NL), Cincinnati Red Stockings (AA), Columbus Buckeyes (AA), St. Louis Browns (1882–1900), Kansas City Cowboys (UA), Chicago Browns/Pittsburgh Stogies, Baltimore Monumentals	
Rip Wheeler	September 30, 1921	September 29, 1924	Pitcher	Pittsburgh Pirates, Chicago Cubs	
Bobby Wheelock	May 19, 1887	September 27, 1891	Shortstop	Boston Beaneaters, Columbus Solons	
Gary Wheelock	September 17, 1976	April 18, 1980	Pitcher	California Angels, Seattle Mariners	
Jimmy Whelan	April 24, 1913	April 24, 1913	Pinch hitter	St. Louis Cardinals	
Kevin Whelan	June 10, 2011		Pitcher	New York Yankees	
Tom Whelan	August 13, 1920	August 13, 1920	First baseman	Boston Braves	
Jack Whillock	August 29, 1971	September 21, 1971	Pitcher	Detroit Tigers	
Matt Whisenant	July 4, 1997	May 29, 2000	Pitcher	Florida Marlins, Kansas City Royals, San Diego Padres	
Pete Whisenant	April 16, 1952	August 9, 1961	Outfielder	Boston Braves, St. Louis Cardinals, Chicago Cubs, Cincinnati Redlegs/Reds, Cleveland Indians, Washington Senators/Minnesota Twins	
Larry Whisenton	September 17, 1977	September 30, 1982	Outfielder	Atlanta Braves	
Wes Whisler	June 2, 2009		Pitcher	Chicago White Sox	
Lew Whistler	August 7, 1890	June 15, 1893	First baseman	New York Giants, Baltimore Orioles (19th century), Louisville Colonels, St. Louis Browns (1882–1900)	
Lou Whitaker	September 9, 1977	October 1, 1995	Second baseman	Detroit Tigers	
Pat Whitaker	October 11, 1888	July 25, 1889	Pitcher	Baltimore Orioles (19th century)	
Steve Whitaker	August 23, 1966	May 9, 1970	Outfielder	New York Yankees, Seattle Pilots, San Francisco Giants	
Bill Whitby	June 17, 1964	June 25, 1964	Pitcher	Minnesota Twins	
Bob Whitcher	August 20, 1945	September 18, 1945	Pitcher	Boston Braves	
Abe White	July 10, 1937	July 18, 1937	Pitcher	St. Louis Cardinals	
Alex White	April 30, 2011		Pitcher	Cleveland Indians, Colorado Rockies	
Barney White	June 5, 1945	June 16, 1945	Utility infielder	Brooklyn Dodgers	
Bill White (1879 1B)	June 21, 1879	June 21, 1879	First baseman	Providence Grays	
Bill White (SS)	June 1, 1883	October 14, 1888	Shortstop	Pittsburgh Alleghenys, Louisville Colonels, St. Louis Browns (1882–1900)	
Bill White (1B)	May 7, 1956	September 24, 1969	First baseman	New York/San Francisco Giants, St. Louis Cardinals, Philadelphia Phillies	
Bill White (P)	September 5, 2007		Pitcher	Texas Rangers	
Charlie White	April 18, 1954	May 29, 1955	Catcher	Milwaukee Braves	
Deacon White	May 4, 1871	October 4, 1890	Utility player	Cleveland Forest Citys, Boston Red Stockings/Red Caps, Chicago White Stockings, Cincinnati Reds (1876–1880), Buffalo Bisons (NL), Detroit Wolverines, Pittsburgh Alleghenys, Buffalo Bisons (PL)	
Deke White	September 14, 1895	September 27, 1895	Pitcher	Philadelphia Phillies	
Derrick White	July 22, 1993	August 18, 1998	First baseman	Montreal Expos, Detroit Tigers, Chicago Cubs, Colorado Rockies	
Devon White	September 2, 1985	October 5, 2001	Outfielder	Toronto Blue Jays, Toronto Blue Jays, Florida Marlins, Arizona Diamondbacks, Los Angeles Dodgers, Milwaukee Brewers	
Doc White	April 22, 1901	October 4, 1913	Pitcher	Philadelphia Phillies, Chicago White Stockings (AL)/White Sox	
Don White	April 19, 1948	October 2, 1949	Outfielder	Philadelphia Athletics	
Ed White	September 16, 1955	September 25, 1955	Outfielder	Chicago White Sox	
Elder White	April 10, 1962	June 3, 1962	Shortstop	Chicago Cubs	
Elmer White	May 4, 1871	September 27, 1871	Outfielder	Cleveland Forest Citys	
Ernie White	May 9, 1940	October 3, 1948	Pitcher	St. Louis Cardinals, Boston Braves	
Frank White	June 12, 1973	September 30, 1990	Second baseman	Kansas City Royals	
Fuzz White	September 17, 1940	May 6, 1947	Outfielder	St. Louis Browns, New York Giants	
Gabe White	May 27, 1994	June 7, 2005	Pitcher	Montreal Expos, Cincinnati Reds, Colorado Rockies, New York Yankees, St. Louis Cardinals	
Hal White	April 22, 1941	May 4, 1954	Pitcher	Detroit Tigers, St. Louis Browns, St. Louis Cardinals	
Jack White (OF)	June 26, 1904	June 26, 1904	Outfielder	Boston Beaneaters	
Jack White (IF)	June 22, 1927	April 19, 1928	Second baseman	Cincinnati Reds	
Jerry White	September 16, 1974	June 9, 1986	Outfielder	Montreal Expos, Chicago Cubs, St. Louis Cardinals	
Jo-Jo White	April 15, 1932	September 30, 1944	Outfielder	Detroit Tigers, Philadelphia Athletics, Cincinnati Reds	
Kirby White	May 4, 1909	May 24, 1911	Pitcher	Boston Doves, Pittsburgh Pirates	
Larry White	September 20, 1983	September 25, 1984	Pitcher	Los Angeles Dodgers	
Matt White	May 27, 2003	August 27, 2005	Pitcher	Boston Red Sox, Seattle Mariners, Washington Nationals	
Mike White	September 21, 1963	May 5, 1965	Outfielder	Houston Colt .45s/Astros	
Myron White	September 4, 1978	October 1, 1978	Outfielder	Los Angeles Dodgers	
Rick White	April 6, 1994	September 5, 2007	Pitcher	Pittsburgh Pirates, Tampa Bay Devil Rays, New York Mets, Colorado Rockies, St. Louis Cardinals, Chicago White Sox, Houston Astros, Cleveland Indians, Cincinnati Reds, Philadelphia Phillies, Seattle Mariners	
Rondell White	September 1, 1993	September 30, 2007	Outfielder	Montreal Expos, Chicago Cubs, New York Yankees, San Diego Padres, Kansas City Royals, Detroit Tigers, Minnesota Twins	
Roy White	September 7, 1965	September 27, 1979	Outfielder	New York Yankees	
Sam White	September 8, 1919	September 8, 1919	Catcher	Boston Braves	
Sammy White	September 26, 1951	August 23, 1962	Catcher	Boston Red Sox, Milwaukee Braves, Philadelphia Phillies	
Sean White	April 4, 2007		Pitcher	Seattle Mariners	
Steve White	May 29, 1912	July 5, 1912	Pitcher	Washington Senators, Boston Braves	
Warren White	June 17, 1871	June 27, 1884	Third baseman	Washington Olympics, Washington Nationals (NA), Washington Blue Legs, Baltimore Canaries, Chicago White Stockings, Washington Nationals (UA)	
Will White	July 20, 1877	July 5, 1886	Pitcher	Boston Red Caps, Cincinnati Reds (1876–1880), Detroit Wolverines, Cincinnati Red Stockings (AA)	
Ed Whited	July 5, 1989	October 1, 1989	Third baseman	Atlanta Braves	
Burgess Whitehead	April 30, 1933	September 29, 1946	Second baseman	St. Louis Cardinals, New York Giants, Pittsburgh Pirates	
John Whitehead	April 19, 1935	May 13, 1942	Pitcher	Chicago White Sox, St. Louis Browns	
Milt Whitehead	April 20, 1884	October 19, 1884	Shortstop	St. Louis Maroons, Kansas City Cowboys (UA)	
Earl Whitehill	September 15, 1923	September 30, 1939	Pitcher	Detroit Tigers, Washington Senators, Cleveland Indians, Chicago Cubs	
Charlie Whitehouse	August 29, 1914	July 5, 1919	Pitcher	Indianapolis Hoosiers (FL)/Newark Peppers, Washington Senators	
Gil Whitehouse	June 20, 1912	October 3, 1915	Pitcher	Boston Braves, Newark Peppers	
Len Whitehouse	September 1, 1981	June 24, 1985	Pitcher	Texas Rangers, Minnesota Twins	
Wally Whitehurst	July 17, 1989	August 29, 1996	Pitcher	New York Mets, San Diego Padres, New York Yankees	
Guerdon Whiteley	August 7, 1884	July 17, 1885	Outfielder	Cleveland Blues (NL), Boston Beaneaters	
George Whiteman	September 13, 1907	September 2, 1918	Outfielder	Boston Americans/Red Sox, New York Yankees	
Mark Whiten	July 12, 1990	May 11, 2000	Outfielder	Toronto Blue Jays, Cleveland Indians, St. Louis Cardinals, Boston Red Sox, Philadelphia Phillies, Atlanta Braves, Seattle Mariners, New York Yankees	
Josh Whitesell	September 2, 2008		First baseman	Arizona Diamondbacks	
Eli Whiteside	July 5, 2005		Catcher	Baltimore Orioles, San Francisco Giants	
Matt Whiteside	August 5, 1992	May 7, 2005	Pitcher	Texas Rangers, Philadelphia Phillies, San Diego Padres, Atlanta Braves, Toronto Blue Jays	
Sean Whiteside	April 29, 1995	May 3, 1995	Pitcher	Detroit Tigers	
Fred Whitfield	May 27, 1962	August 11, 1970	First baseman	St. Louis Cardinals, Cleveland Indians, Cincinnati Reds, Montreal Expos	
Terry Whitfield	September 29, 1974	May 23, 1986	Outfielder	New York Yankees, San Francisco Giants, Los Angeles Dodgers	
Ed Whiting	May 2, 1882	July 3, 1886	Catcher	Baltimore Orioles (19th century), Louisville Eclipse, Washington Nationals (1886–1889)	
Jesse Whiting	September 27, 1902	April 29, 1907	Pitcher	Philadelphia Phillies, Brooklyn Superbas	
Dick Whitman	April 16, 1946	June 4, 1951	Outfielder	Brooklyn Dodgers, Philadelphia Phillies	
Frank Whitman	June 30, 1946	September 28, 1948	Shortstop	Chicago White Sox	
Dan Whitmer	July 20, 1980	May 10, 1981	Catcher	California Angels, Toronto Blue Jays	
Darrell Whitmore	June 25, 1993	June 3, 1995	Outfielder	Florida Marlins	
Art Whitney	May 1, 1880	August 22, 1891	Third baseman	Worcester Ruby Legs, Detroit Wolverines, Providence Grays, Pittsburgh Alleghenys, New York Giants, New York Giants (PL), Cincinnati Kelly's Killers, St. Louis Browns (1882–1900)	
Frank Whitney	May 17, 1876	August 21, 1876	Outfielder	Boston Red Caps	
Jim Whitney	May 2, 1881	July 16, 1890	Pitcher	Boston Red Caps/Beaneaters, Kansas City Cowboys (NL), Washington Nationals (1886–1889), Indianapolis Hoosiers (NL), Philadelphia Athletics (American Association)	
Pinky Whitney	April 11, 1928	September 5, 1939	Third baseman	Philadelphia Phillies, Boston Braves/Bees	
Bill Whitrock	May 3, 1890	July 11, 1896	Pitcher	St. Louis Browns (1882–1900), Louisville Colonels, Cincinnati Reds, Philadelphia Phillies	
Ed Whitson	September 4, 1977	September 29, 1991	Pitcher	Pittsburgh Pirates, San Francisco Giants, Cleveland Indians, San Diego Padres, New York Yankees	
Ernie Whitt	September 12, 1976	July 3, 1991	Catcher	Boston Red Sox, Toronto Blue Jays, Atlanta Braves, Baltimore Orioles	
Walt Whittaker	July 6, 1916	July 6, 1916	Pitcher	Philadelphia Athletics	
Possum Whitted	September 16, 1912	April 23, 1922	Outfielder	St. Louis Cardinals, Boston Braves, Philadelphia Phillies, Pittsburgh Pirates, Brooklyn Robins	
