= List of Major League Baseball players (W) =

The following is a list of Major League Baseball players, retired or active. As of the end of the 2011 season, there have been 998 players with a last name that begins with W who have been on a major league roster at some point.

== W ==
For reasons of space, this list has been split into two pages:

- Paul Wachtel through Possum Whitted
- Kevin Wickander through Biff Wysong
