= 1940 Major League Baseball All-Star Game =

1940 American baseball competition

	1	2	3	4	5	6	7	8	9	R	H	E
American League	0	0	0	0	0	0	0	0	0	0	3	1
National League	3	0	0	0	0	0	0	1	X	4	7	0
- Date: July 9, 1940
- Venue: Sportsman's Park
- City: St. Louis, Missouri
- Managers: Joe Cronin (BRS); Bill McKechnie (CIN)
- Attendance: 32,373
- Ceremonial first pitch: None
- Radio: CBS; NBC; Mutual; KWK (STL)
- Radio announcers: Mel Allen and France Laux (CBS); Tom Manning, Alex Buchan and Ray Schmidt (NBC); Red Barber and Bob Elson (Mutual); Johnny O'Hara and Johnny Neblett (KWK)

The 1940 Major League Baseball All-Star Game was the eighth playing of the mid-summer classic between the all-stars of the American League (AL) and National League (NL), the two leagues comprising Major League Baseball. The game was held on July 9, 1940, at Sportsman's Park in St. Louis, Missouri, the home of both the St. Louis Cardinals of the National League (who were the designated host team) and the St. Louis Browns of the American League. The game resulted in the National League defeating the American League 4–0.

== Rosters ==
Players in italics have since been inducted into the National Baseball Hall of Fame.

=== American League ===
Starters
Position	Player	Team	All-Star Games
P	Red Ruffing	Yankees	4
C	Bill Dickey	Yankees	7
1B	Jimmie Foxx	Red Sox	8
2B	Joe Gordon	Yankees	2
3B	Cecil Travis	Senators	2
SS	Luke Appling	White Sox	3
LF	Ted Williams	Red Sox	1
CF	Joe DiMaggio	Yankees	5
RF	Charlie Keller	Yankees	1

Pitchers
Position	Player	Team	All-Star Games
P	Tommy Bridges	Tigers	6
P	Bob Feller	Indians	3
P	Dutch Leonard	Senators	1
P	Al Milnar	Indians	1
P	Bobo Newsom	Tigers	3
P	Monte Pearson	Yankees	2

Reserves
Position	Player	Team	All-Star Games
C	Frankie Hayes	Athletics	2
C	Rollie Hemsley	Indians	4
1B	George McQuinn	Browns	2
2B	Ray Mack	Indians	1
3B	Ken Keltner	Indians	1
3B	Red Rolfe	Yankees	4
SS	Lou Boudreau	Indians	1
OF	Doc Cramer	Red Sox	5
OF	Lou Finney	Red Sox	1
OF	Hank Greenberg	Tigers	4
OF	Bob Johnson	Athletics	4

=== National League ===
Starters
Position	Player	Team	All-Star Games
P	Paul Derringer	Reds	4
C	Ernie Lombardi	Reds	5
1B	Johnny Mize	Cardinals	3
2B	Billy Herman	Cubs	7
3B	Cookie Lavagetto	Dodgers	3
SS	Arky Vaughan	Pirates	7
LF	Joe Medwick	Dodgers	7
CF	Terry Moore	Cardinals	2
RF	Max West	Braves	1

Pitchers
Position	Player	Team	All-Star Games
P	Larry French	Cubs	1
P	Kirby Higbe	Phillies	1
P	Carl Hubbell	Giants	7
P	Hugh Mulcahy	Phillies	1
P	Bucky Walters	Reds	3
P	Whit Wyatt	Dodgers	2

Reserves
Position	Player	Team	All-Star Games
C	Harry Danning	Giants	3
C	Babe Phelps	Dodgers	3
1B	Frank McCormick	Reds	3
2B	Pete Coscarart	Dodgers	1
3B	Pinky May	Phillies	1
SS	Leo Durocher	Dodgers	3
SS	Billy Jurges	Giants	3
SS	Eddie Miller	Braves	1
OF	Jo-Jo Moore	Giants	6
OF	Hank Leiber	Cubs	2
OF	Bill Nicholson	Cubs	1
OF	Mel Ott	Giants	7

== Game ==
=== Umpires ===
Position	Umpire	League
Home Plate	Beans Reardon	National
First Base	George Pipgras	American
Second Base	Bill Stewart	National
Third Base	Steve Basil	American

The umpires changed assignments in the middle of the fifth inning – Reardon and Basil swapped positions, also Pipgras and Stewart swapped positions.

=== Starting lineups ===
American League				National League			
Order	Player	Team	Position	Order	Player	Team	Position
1	Cecil Travis	Senators	3B	1	Arky Vaughan	Pirates	SS
2	Ted Williams	Red Sox	LF	2	Billy Herman	Cubs	2B
3	Charlie Keller	Yankees	RF	3	Max West	Braves	RF
4	Joe DiMaggio	Yankees	CF	4	Johnny Mize	Cardinals	1B
5	Jimmie Foxx	Red Sox	1B	5	Ernie Lombardi	Reds	C
6	Luke Appling	White Sox	SS	6	Joe Medwick	Dodgers	LF
7	Bill Dickey	Yankees	C	7	Cookie Lavagetto	Dodgers	3B
8	Joe Gordon	Yankees	2B	8	Terry Moore	Cardinals	CF
9	Red Ruffing	Yankees	P	9	Paul Derringer	Reds	P

=== Game summary ===
Tuesday, July 9, 1940 1:30 pm (CT) at Sportsman's Park in St. Louis, Missouri
Team	1	2	3	4	5	6	7	8	9	R	H	E
American League	0	0	0	0	0	0	0	0	0	0	3	1
National League	3	0	0	0	0	0	0	1	X	4	7	1
WP: Paul Derringer (1–0) LP: Red Ruffing (0–1) Sv: Carl Hubbell (1); Home runs: AL: None; NL: Max West (1)
