= George McKinnon =

American college athletics coach (1918–2009)

Biographical details
- Born: November 24, 1918; Cleveland, Ohio, U.S.
- Died: December 14, 2009 (aged 91); Palm Harbor, Florida, U.S.
- Education: Northwestern, Western Reserve

Playing career
- c. 1940: Northwestern
- Position: Shortstop

Coaching career (HC unless noted)
- 1945–1949: Fenn College basketball
- 1947–1949: Fenn College baseball
- 1960s: Northwestern football (assistant)
- 1962–1981: Northwestern baseball

Head coaching record
- Overall: 322–405–7 (baseball); 20–40 (basketball)

Accomplishments and honors

Awards
- Northwestern Athletics Hall of Fame (1984)

George Yapple McKinnon (November 24, 1918 – December 15, 2009) was an American minor league baseball player, coach of college athletics, and a Navy communications officer during World War II. He is best known for his years coaching at Northwestern University.

== Early years ==
McKinnon played college baseball at Northwestern University as a shortstop where he was named All-Big Ten and helped his team win a conference championship. After college, McKinnon went on to play minor league baseball during the 1941 season. He played 22 games as a second baseman for the Winnipeg Maroons in Manitoba, and 27 games as a third baseman for the Zanesville Cubs, a Chicago Cubs farm team in Ohio. For the 1941 season, he compiled a .203 Batting average with one home run.

== Military service ==
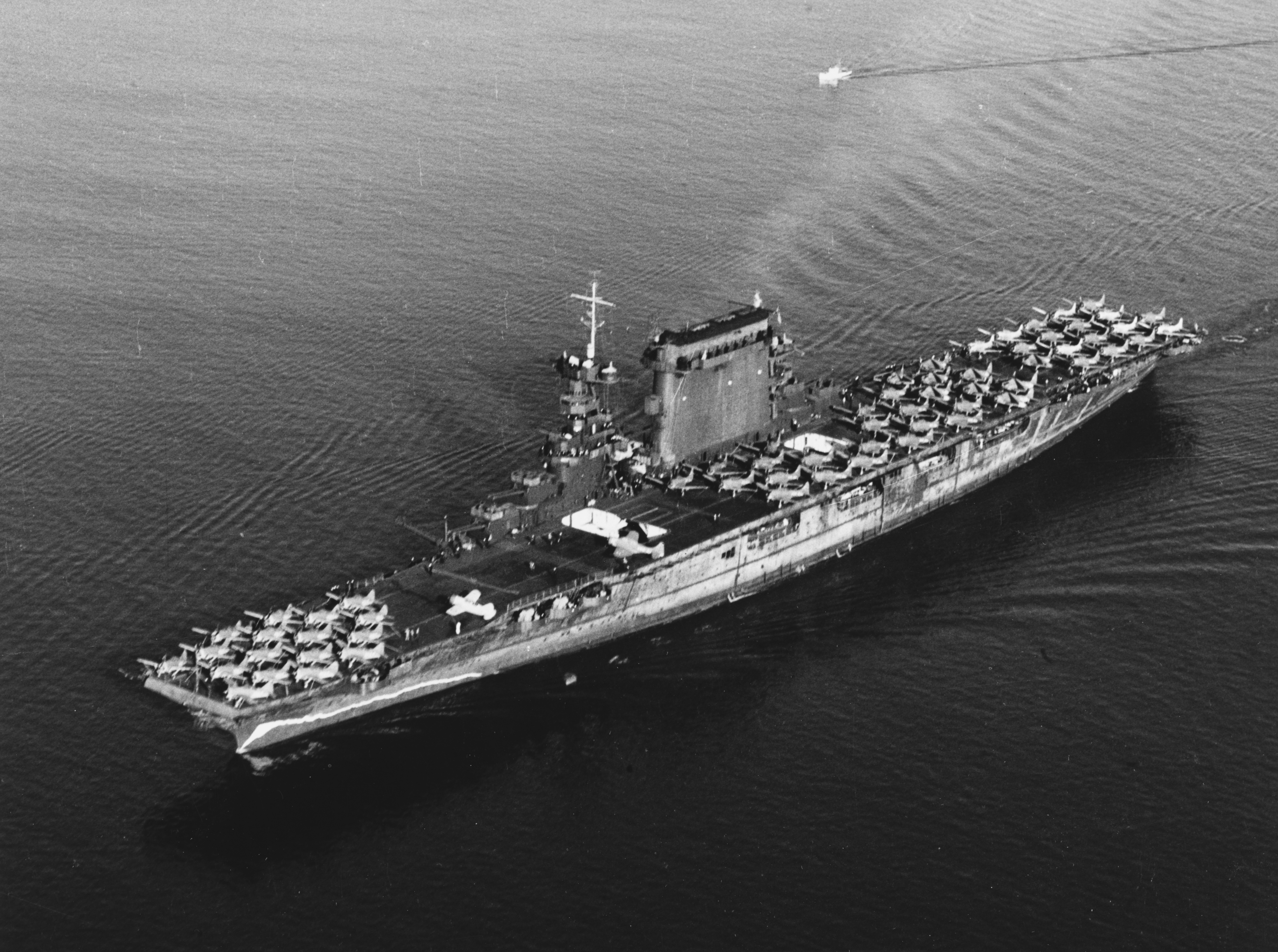
USS Lexington in October 1941

McKinnon served as a communications officer in the United States Navy aboard the ill-fated USS Lexington. Ensign McKinnon was soon seeing plenty of action aboard the aircraft carrier. "We were attacked by two waves of bombers, got 16 of 18, and it is doubtful if the other two got home," he told the Harry Grayson on April 22, 1942. "I saw the entire action and there was more cheering on our ship than at a Northwestern–Notre Dame football game." On May 8, 1942, things took a dramatic turn for the crew of the USS Lexington. The aircraft carrier was torpedoed and sunk by Japanese destroyers during the Battle of the Coral Sea. McKinnon, however, survived the sinking and served out the duration of the war for the Navy, but an eventual return to civilian life did not mean a return to the diamond, at least not as a player. After he was sent back to the US to recuperate, and Navy officials, noticing his outstanding baseball play and Northwestern University, assigned him to coaching duties with Navy football and Navy baseball teams.

== Coaching career ==
After the war, McKinnon earned his master's degree from Western Reserve University in 1947 and joined the coaching staff at Cleveland Heights High School the following year. He remained there for 12 years before returning to Northwestern as an assistant football coach to Ara Parseghian.

McKinnon began his coaching career in 1961 as an assistant to Ara Parseghian, head coach of the Northwestern Wildcats football team. McKinnon also coached the Northwestern Wildcats baseball team. During his 20 years as head baseball coach, McKinnon led the Wildcats to five 20-win seasons including a career-best 28–12 record in 1973. McKinnon served as the head coach of the baseball program from 1962 to 1981 and compiled a 304–391–6 record over that span. At the time of his retirement following the 1981 season, he was the school's winningest coach in any sport. He also took a teaching and coaching position at Fenn College (now part of Cleveland State University), coaching both basketball and baseball.

In 1978, McKinnon received an award for 25 years of leadership and devotion to collegiate baseball from the American Association of College Baseball Coaches. He became a member of the Illinois High School Baseball Coaches Association Hall of Fame and was inducted in the Northwestern Athletics Hall of Fame in 1994.

== Death ==
McKinnon died on December 14, 2009, at the age of 91.
