= Hawthorne Township, White County, Illinois =

Hawthorne Township
- Township

- Location of Illinois in the United States
- Coordinates: 38°05′20″N 88°04′10″W
- Country: United States
- State: Illinois
- County: White
- Organized: November 7, 1871

Area
  - Total: 53.96 sq mi (139.8 km^{2})
  - Land: 52.81 sq mi (136.8 km^{2})
  - Water: 1.15 sq mi (3.0 km^{2})
- Elevation: 390 ft (120 m)

Population (2010)
  - Estimate (2016): 271
- Time zone: UTC-6 (CST)
  - Summer (DST): UTC-5 (CDT)
- ZIP code: XXXXX
- Area code: 618
- FIPS code: 17-193-33591

Hawthorne Township is located in White County, Illinois. As of the 2010 census, its population was 275 and it contained 141 housing units.

== Notable residents ==
- Frank McElyea, MLB outfielder for the Boston Brakes

== Geography ==
According to the 2010 census, the township has a total area of 53.96 square miles (139.8 km^{2}), of which 52.81 square miles (136.8 km^{2}) (or 97.87%) is land and 1.15 square miles (3.0 km^{2}) (or 2.13%) is water.

== Demographics ==
Historical population
Census	Pop.	Note	%±
2016 (est.)	271
U.S. Decennial Census
