= Chuck Shanklin =

American basketball player and minor league baseball player

Personal information
- Born: September 3, 1921 Indianapolis, Indiana, U.S.
- Died: August 19, 2006 (aged 84) Avon, Indiana, U.S.
- Listed height: 5 ft 9 in (1.75 m)
- Listed weight: 160 lb (73 kg)

Career information
- High school: Decatur Central (Indianapolis, Indiana)
- Position: Guard

Career history
- 1942–1944: Indianapolis Pure Oils
- 1944–1945: Oshkosh All-Stars

Charles Cecil Shanklin Jr. (September 3, 1921 – August 19, 2006) was an American professional basketball player. He played for the Oshkosh All-Stars in the National Basketball League during the 1944–45 season and averaged 3.2 points per game.

Shanklin also played minor league baseball. He competed for the Zanesville Cubs (1942), Lockport Cubs (1943), Kansas City Blues (1944), and the Little Rock Travelers (1945).
