= Bill Donovan (Boston Braves pitcher) =

American baseball player (1916-1997)

- Pitcher
- Born: July 6, 1916; Maywood, Illinois
- Died: September 25, 1997 (aged 81); Maywood, Illinois
- Batted: Right Threw: Left

MLB debut
- April 19, 1942, for the Boston Braves

Last MLB appearance
- June 20, 1943, for the Boston Braves

MLB statistics
- Win–loss record: 4–6
- Earned run average: 3.20
- Strikeouts: 24
- Stats at Baseball Reference

Teams
- Boston Braves (1942–1943)

Willard Earl Donovan (July 6, 1916 – September 25, 1997) was an American baseball player who was a pitcher in Major League Baseball in 1942 and 1943 for the Boston Braves. Listed at 6 ft 2 in (1.88 m), 198 lb (90 kg), Donovan was a switch-hitter and threw left-handed. He was born in Maywood, Illinois.

Over two seasons, Donovan posted a 4–6 record with 23 strikeouts and a 3.20 ERA in 38 appearances, including 10 starts, two complete games, and 104 innings pitched.

From 1943 to 1945, Donovan served in the military during World War II.

Donovan died in his homeland of Maywood, Illinois, at the age of 81.
