= Frank McElyea =

American baseball player (1918-1987)

- Left fielder
- Born: August 4, 1918; Hawthorne Township, White County, Illinois
- Died: April 19, 1987 (aged 68); Evansville, Indiana
- Batted: Right Threw: Right

MLB debut
- September 10, 1942, for the Boston Braves

Last MLB appearance
- September 26, 1942, for the Boston Braves

MLB statistics
- Batting average: .000
- Home runs: 0
- Runs batted in: 0
- Runs scored: 2
- Stats at Baseball Reference

Teams
- Boston Braves (1942)

Frank McElyea (August 4, 1918 – April 19, 1987) was a Major League Baseball player. He played seven games with the Boston Braves between September 10 and 26, 1942.

McElyea served in the United States Army for three years (1943–1945) during World War II.

McElyea died on April 19, 1987.
