= John Dudra =

American baseball player (1916–1965)

John Joseph Dudra (May 27, 1916 – October 25, 1965) was a Major League Baseball infielder who played for the Boston Braves in 1941. A native of Assumption, Illinois, the 25-year-old rookie stood 5 ft 11 1/2 in (1.82 m) and weighed 175 lbs.

Dudra put up some impressive numbers during his short time in the big leagues. In his fourteen games (September 7-September 25) he played all four infield positions and went 9-for-25, a .360 batting average. He hit three doubles, one triple, scored three runs, and had three runs batted in. His on-base percentage was .429, and his slugging percentage was .560.

On defense, he had 20 putouts, 13 assists, and 1 error, giving him a fielding percentage of .971. He also took part in 5 double plays.

Dudra served in the US Army during World War II, and died from diabetes at the age of 49 in Pana, Illinois.

== Trivia ==
- Dudra was born in the same week as Braves second baseman Frank Drews. (May 21–27, 1916)
