= Al Montgomery =

American baseball player (1920-1942)

- Catcher
- Born: July 3, 1920; Loving, New Mexico, U.S.
- Died: April 26, 1942 (aged 21); Petersburg, Virginia, U.S.
- Batted: Right Threw: Right

MLB debut
- June 20, 1941, for the Boston Braves

Last MLB appearance
- September 17, 1941, for the Boston Braves

MLB statistics
- Batting average: .192
- Home runs: 0
- Runs batted in: 4
- Stats at Baseball Reference

Teams
- Boston Braves (1941)

Alvin Atlas Montgomery (July 3, 1920 – April 26, 1942) was an American catcher in Major League Baseball. He played for the Boston Braves in 1941.

He appeared in the movie The Pride of the Yankees as an uncredited extra, playing various catchers.

Montgomery and his Hartford Chiefs teammate Ralph Younkers were involved in a fatal three-car accident on U.S. Route 460 in Waverly, Virginia on April 26, 1942. Younkers was killed instantly while Montgomery died at a hospital in Petersburg, Virginia. His wife was also injured in the accident.

== See also ==
- List of baseball players who died during their careers
