= Jim Hickey (1940s pitcher) =

American baseball player (1920-1997)

- Pitcher
- Born: October 22, 1920; North Abington, Massachusetts, U.S.
- Died: September 20, 1997 (aged 76); Manchester, Connecticut, U.S.
- Batted: Right Threw: Right

MLB debut
- April 25, 1942, for the Boston Braves

Last MLB appearance
- July 31, 1944, for the Boston Braves

MLB statistics
- Win–loss record: 0–1
- Earned run average: 6.75
- Strikeouts: 3
- Stats at Baseball Reference

Teams
- Boston Braves (1942, 1944)

James Robert Hickey (October 22, 1920 – September 20, 1997), nicknamed "Sid", was an American pitcher in Major League Baseball (MLB). He pitched for the Boston Braves in 1942 and 1944.

Hickey's only decision came in his MLB debut when he pitched 1 1/3 innings, surrendering 4 runs, in a 5–1 loss to the New York Giants on April 25, 1942.
