= George Diehl =

American baseball player (1918–1986)

- Pitcher
- Born: February 25, 1918; Emmaus, Pennsylvania, U.S.
- Died: August 24, 1986 (aged 68); Kingsport, Tennessee, U.S.
- Batted: Right Threw: Right

MLB debut
- April 19, 1942, for the Boston Braves

Last MLB appearance
- May 5, 1943, for the Boston Braves

MLB statistics
- Games played: 2
- Innings pitched: 7 2/3
- Win–loss record: 0–0
- Earned run average: 3.52
- Stats at Baseball Reference

Teams
- Boston Braves (1942–1943)

George Krause Diehl (February 25, 1918 – August 24, 1986) was an American pitcher in Major League Baseball. He played for the Boston Braves.

In 1938, Diehl was one of several players recruited from Allentown, Pennsylvania to play in Kingsport, Tennessee for the newly formed Kingsport Cherokees of the Appalachian League. Diehl began living in Kingsport after that point. He worked there in the mortgage business for decades before dying of a heart attack.
