= Buster Bray =

American baseball player (1913-1982)

- Outfielder
- Born: April 1, 1913; Birmingham, Alabama, U.S.
- Died: September 4, 1982 (aged 69); Evansville, Indiana, U.S.
- Batted: Left Threw: Left

MLB debut
- April 18, 1941, for the Boston Braves

Last MLB appearance
- May 7, 1941, for the Boston Braves

MLB statistics
- Batting average: .091
- Home runs: 0
- Hits: 1
- Stats at Baseball Reference

Teams
- Boston Braves (1941)

Clarence Wilbur "Buster" Bray (April 1, 1913 – September 4, 1982) was an American professional baseball player. He played in four games in Major League Baseball for the Boston Braves in 1941, three of them in center field.
