= Mel Preibisch =

American baseball player (1914-1980)

- Outfielder
- Born: November 23, 1914; Sealy, Texas, U.S.
- Died: April 12, 1980 (aged 65); Sealy, Texas, U.S.
- Batted: Right Threw: Right

MLB debut
- September 17, 1940, for the Boston Bees

Last MLB appearance
- May 5, 1941, for the Boston Braves

MLB statistics
- Batting average: .205
- Home runs: 0
- Runs batted in: 5
- Stats at Baseball Reference

Teams
- Boston Bees/Braves (1940–41)

Melvin Aloysius "Primo" Preibisch (November 23, 1914 – April 12, 1980) was an American professional baseball player. He played parts of two seasons in Major League Baseball, 1940 and 1941, for the Boston Braves (known as the Bees in 1940), primarily as a center fielder.
