= Eddie Miller (infielder) =

American baseball player (1916–1997)

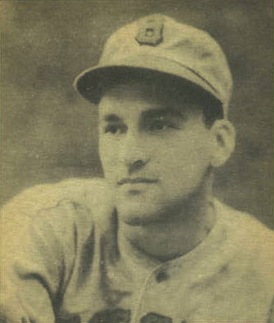
- Shortstop
- Born: November 26, 1916; Pittsburgh, Pennsylvania, U.S.
- Died: July 31, 1997 (aged 80); Lake Worth, Florida, U.S.
- Batted: Right Threw: Right

MLB debut
- September 9, 1936, for the Cincinnati Reds

Last MLB appearance
- September 24, 1950, for the St. Louis Cardinals

MLB statistics
- Batting average: .238
- Home runs: 97
- Runs batted in: 640
- Stats at Baseball Reference

Teams
- Cincinnati Reds (1936–1937); Boston Bees / Braves (1939–1942); Cincinnati Reds (1943–1947); Philadelphia Phillies (1948–1949); St. Louis Cardinals (1950)

Career highlights and awards
- 7× All-Star (1940–1944, 1946, 1947)

Edward Robert Miller (November 26, 1916 – July 31, 1997) was an American professional baseball player, a shortstop who played for 14 seasons in the National League between 1936 and 1950. He was a talented fielder and a perennial All-Star during the 1940s.

Born in Pittsburgh, Miller made his Major League debut with the Cincinnati Reds in 1936 as a 19-year-old. He played in 41 games over 2 seasons with the Reds before being traded to the New York Yankees in 1938 in exchange for Willard Hershberger. Miller never played for the Yankees at the major league level and was subsequently traded to the Boston Bees less than a year later.

He became the starting shortstop while in Boston, and established himself as one of the National League's best shortstops during his four seasons there. His first season with Boston was shortened when he fractured his ankle in a collision with Al Simmons. He recovered in 1940 to a career-best .276 for the Bees while leading all NL shortstops in fielding percentage and appearing in the MLB All-Star Game. While his batting average fell over the next two seasons with Boston, he led all shortstops in fielding percentage both years. He was an All-Star in 1941 and was named as a starter in the All-Star Game in 1942. After the 1942 season, he was traded back to the Reds in exchange for Eddie Joost and Nate Andrews.

He spent five seasons as the Reds' starting shortstop and earned four more selections to the All-Star Game while with the club. He continued to play solid defense while with Cincinnati, and he led all shortstops in fielding on two further occasions. His final year with the Reds was one of his better seasons as a hitter, as he led the league in doubles and was among the top 10 in home runs and runs batted in. He was traded to the Philadelphia Phillies for Johnny Wyrostek before the start of the 1948 season.

Miller served as the Phillies' shortstop in 1948 but moved to second base in 1949 when he swapped positions with Granny Hamner. After two average seasons with Philadelphia, he was acquired by the St. Louis Cardinals for the 1950 season, his last in the majors.

Miller died in 1997 in Lake Worth, Florida.

== See also ==
- List of Major League Baseball annual doubles leaders

== Sources ==
- Career statistics from MLB, or Baseball Reference
