= Art Johnson (1940s pitcher) =

American baseball player (1919-2008)

- Pitcher
- Born: July 16, 1919; Winchester, Massachusetts, U.S.
- Died: April 27, 2008 (aged 88); Holden, Massachusetts, U.S.
- Batted: Left Threw: Left

MLB debut
- September 22, 1940, for the Boston Braves

Last MLB appearance
- September 19, 1942, for the Boston Braves

MLB statistics
- Win–loss record: 7–16
- Earned run average: 3.68
- Strikeouts: 71
- Stats at Baseball Reference

Teams
- Boston Bees / Braves (1940–1942)

Arthur Henry Johnson (July 16, 1919 – April 27, 2008) was an American left-handed pitcher in Major League Baseball who played for the Boston Bees/Braves from 1940 through 1942. Listed at 6 ft 2 in (1.88 m), 185 lb (84 kg), Johnson also batted left-handed. Although he threw and batted left handed, he was ambidextrous. Whenever he was asked to give someone his autograph, he always obliged, but wrote with his right hand.

== Biography ==
Born in Winchester, Massachusetts, Johnson began his minor league career with Erie of the Middle Atlantic League in 1938. That year, in 14 games, he won 2 and lost 6. In 1939, he was with Evansville of the Three-I League. In 12 games, he won all four of his decisions, earning a promotion to Hartford the next year. 1940 was his best year in baseball. In 33 games with Hartford of the Eastern League, Johnson won 17 and lost 11, with 27 complete games. This earned him a promotion to the major league Boston Bees at the end of the regular minor league season.

Johnson made his major league debut on September 22, 1940, against the New York Giants, pitching the 6th and 7th inning for Boston. Mel Ott played third base that day for the Giants; Ott came up to bat against him and he hit Ott with a pitch, knocking him to the ground. Ott stared at Johnson as he trotted off to first base.

Johnson was a member of the Boston Braves (the team name was changed that year) for the entire season of 1941. On April 30, in a game against the Chicago Cubs, he got his first major league base hit. On May 17, he pitched in relief and was credited with his first major league win against the St. Louis Cardinals. The game went 12 innings and he pitched the last 2 2/3 innings of the game, and the game was won by a Babe Dahlgren home run in the 12th inning. On May 30, he pitched a nifty five hit complete game win against the Philadelphia Phillies. In this game he went one for four at the plate, scored his first run in the major leagues and got his first major league RBI. A few days later, on June 4, he pitched another complete game, scattering 9 hits, and knocked the Cardinals out of first place. On June 21, he won again, this time in relief against the Chicago Cubs.

The toughest day that Johnson had in the majors occurred on August 20, when he pitched against the Cardinals. In the opening game of a doubleheader which the Cardinals eventually won, he faced veteran captain and center fielder of the Cardinals, Terry Moore. With a 2-1 count, he got wild and hit Moore with a pitch behind the left ear. Moore dropped to the ground and lay unconscious at the plate until an ambulance arrived and took Moore to the hospital. Johnson had tears in his eyes in the clubhouse, after the game. Moore was out for a few weeks and was affected by this beaning for the rest of his life. Around 1990, with both men long retired, he and Moore were reunited at a baseball players convention and spoke about the incident. Moore told him that he always had headaches after the beaning. In the book "One Day in Mudville", which was written by Johnson's friend Rip Pallotta, he spoke about this beaning. "It scares you. Because, you know, you weren't throwing at him. I hollered the minute I let the ball go. I knew it was going to come awful close and I hollered 'look out!' He froze. He absolutely froze in place. He never ducked, he just froze. He never tried to get out of the way. I don't know why he froze, but he did. I had two strikes on him. I was trying to brush him back, but I certainly wasn't throwing at him. I met him some years later in St. Petersburg, Florida in 1990 and he said he was still getting migraine headaches."

Johnson was hurt for most of the 1942 season, appearing on only 4 games. The injury started in spring training. He pitched a game and manager Casey Stengel asked him if he wanted to come out. Johnson told him that he wanted to stay in for just one more inning. With one pitch, he felt something pop in his shoulder. That was the beginning of an injury from which he never recovered.

From 1943 to 1945 during World War II, Johnson went on to serve in the Navy in the Pacific as a gunner's mate aboard the aircraft carrier USS Langley; he received the Purple Heart after suffering shrapnel wounds to his knees when a Japanese kamikaze crashed into the deck.

After the war Johnson tried to return but got into only one game in the minor leagues. He then retired from baseball and began his career in the insurance business.

In a three-season major league career, Johnson posted a 7–16 record with 71 strikeouts and a 3.68 earned run average in 49 appearances, including 19 starts, six complete games, one save, and 195 2/3 innings pitched.

Johnson married Loretta Gaffney in May 1942; they had been high school classmates, both being named the most athletic members of their 1938 senior class. He was recognized as one of the oldest living MLB players until his death in Holden, Massachusetts on April 27, 2008; widely believed to have been 91, after his death he was reported to have actually been three years younger.
