= Skippy Roberge =

American baseball player (1917–1993)

- Third baseman/Second baseman
- Born: May 19, 1917; Lowell, Massachusetts, U.S.
- Died: June 7, 1993 (aged 76); Lowell, Massachusetts, U.S.
- Batted: Right Threw: Right

MLB debut
- July 18, 1941, for the Boston Braves

Last MLB appearance
- June 15, 1946, for the Boston Braves

MLB statistics
- Batting average: .220
- Home runs: 3
- Runs batted in: 47

Teams
- Boston Braves (1941–1942; 1946)

Joseph Albert Armand "Skippy" Roberge (May 19, 1917 – June 7, 1993) was an American professional baseball player, an infielder whose professional career lasted for ten seasons between 1939 and 1952 (with 1943–1945 missed due to military service during World War II) and included 177 games played in Major League Baseball for the Boston Braves (1941–1942; 1946).

== Early years ==
Skippy Roberge was born in Lowell, Massachusetts, on May 19, 1917. He attended Keith Academy, now part of Lowell Catholic High School, from 1933 to 1937, where he was the football quarterback, All-American forward for the basketball team, and shortstop and pitcher for the baseball team. He did not attend college.

After high school, Roberge joined a semi-pro baseball team in the Lowell Twilight League, and the Lowell YMCA basketball team, where he played until 1938 when he tried out for the Braves, then nicknamed the Boston Bees. Manager Casey Stengel liked what he saw and assigned Roberge to a Class D farm team, the Bradford Bees, for 1939. The next year, in 1940, Roberge moved up to the Class B team, the Evansville Bees, then to the Class A team, the Hartford Bees, before entering the Majors.

== Baseball career ==
Roberge was a right-handed backup utility Infielder for the Boston Braves from 1941 to 1942, 1946. Listed at 5 feet 11 inches (1.80 m) 185 pounds (84 kg), he made his Major League debut at the age of 24. He never started a game, but finished his career with 508 at-bats and a .220 batting average, with 3 home runs.

- 1941 (55 games): 15 RBIs, .216 batting average.
- 1942 (74 games): 12 RBIs, .215 batting average.
- 1943–1945: Roberge served in the United States Army during World War II (see below).
- 1946 (48 games): 20 RBIs, .231 batting average.

All in all, Roberge batted in 177 games with a career slugging percentage of .283. He also fielded in 163 games with 17 errors, and a .972 fielding percentage.

== Military service ==
Roberge served with the U.S. Army Company C, 52d Infantry Regiment (Anti-Tank), 4th Signal Battalion with the rank of Technician Fifth Grade.

The first few months while stationed in England, he played and taught baseball as part of a traveling squad around England. But in late 1944, as the Allied Forces advanced, Roberge was sent to the front lines, where he was wounded in the Roer River crossing at Linnich, Germany, on February 14, 1945, which earned him the Purple Heart. Roberge was discharged in December 1945.

== Later years ==
Even though his war wound hindered his return to the majors, Roberge continued to play baseball in the minor leagues. He briefly retired from the game for the 1951 season, but spent one final season in the minors playing for the Double-A Little Rock Travelers in 1952 before leaving professional baseball at the age of 35. He then worked the next 22 years back in his hometown at the General Electric Company, while coaching local youth leagues.

Roberge was inducted into the Lowell Catholic High School's Athletic Hall of Fame.

Roberge died in his hometown of Lowell on June 7, 1993, at the age of 76, and is buried in St. Joseph Cemetery in Lowell.
