= Lefty Wallace =

American baseball player (1921–1982)

- Pitcher
- Born: August 12, 1921; Evansville, Indiana, U.S.
- Died: July 28, 1982 (aged 60); Evansville, Indiana, U.S.
- Batted: Left Threw: Left

MLB debut
- May 5, 1942, for the Boston Braves

Last MLB appearance
- September 22, 1946, for the Boston Braves

MLB statistics
- Win–loss record: 5–6
- Earned run average: 4.11
- Strikeouts: 51
- Stats at Baseball Reference

Teams
- Boston Braves (1942, 1945–1946)

James Harold "Lefty" Wallace (August 12, 1921 – July 28, 1982) was an American Major League Baseball pitcher who played in 1942, 1945, and 1946 with the Boston Braves. He batted and threw left-handed.

From 1943 to 1944 Wallace served in the military during World War II.

Wallace was born in and died in Evansville, Indiana.
