= George Barnicle =

American baseball player (1917-1990)

- Pitcher
- Born: August 26, 1917; Fitchburg, Massachusetts, U.S.
- Died: October 10, 1990 (aged 73); Largo, Florida, U.S.
- Batted: Right Threw: Right

MLB debut
- September 6, 1939, for the Boston Bees

Last MLB appearance
- April 19, 1941, for the Boston Braves

MLB statistics
- Win–loss record: 3–3
- Earned run average: 6.55
- Strikeouts: 28
- Stats at Baseball Reference

Teams
- Boston Bees / Braves (1939–1941)

George Bernard Barnicle (August 26, 1917 – October 10, 1990) was an American Major League Baseball pitcher. He played three seasons with the Boston Bees / Braves from 1939 to 1941.
