= Max West =

American baseball player (1916–2003)

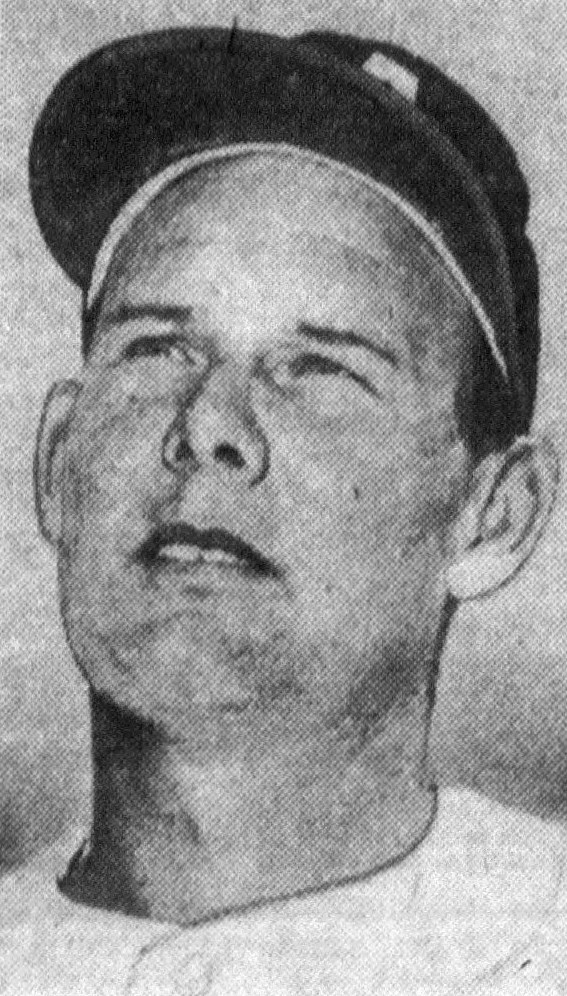
- West, circa 1954
- Outfielder
- Born: November 28, 1916; Dexter, Missouri, U.S.
- Died: December 31, 2003 (aged 87); Sierra Madre, California, U.S.
- Batted: Left Threw: Right

MLB debut
- April 19, 1938, for the Boston Bees

Last MLB appearance
- October 1, 1948, for the Pittsburgh Pirates

MLB statistics
- Batting average: .254
- Home runs: 77
- Runs batted in: 380
- Stats at Baseball Reference

Teams
- Boston Bees / Braves (1938–1942, 1946); Cincinnati Reds (1946); Pittsburgh Pirates (1948)

Career highlights and awards
- All-Star (1940)

Max Edward West (November 28, 1916 – December 31, 2003), was an American outfielder and first baseman for the Boston Bees/Braves (1938–42 and 1946), Cincinnati Reds (1946) and Pittsburgh Pirates (1948).

West signed as an outfielder with Sacramento of the PCL in 1935 and joined Mission of the same league the following year. After batting .330 with 16 home runs and 95 RBIs for Mission in 1937, West's contract was purchased by the Boston Braves. He batted .234 his rookie year but increased his average to .285 in 1939 with 19 home runs and 82 RBIs (all career highs), finishing 23rd in voting for the 1939 National League MVP.

West was named to the 1940 National League All-Star Team, his only career appearance, and was inserted as the starting right fielder at the last minute by NL manager Bill McKechnie (over Mel Ott). In his only career All-Star at bat, he hit what would be the eventual game-winner, a three-run home run in the first inning off Red Ruffing at Sportsman's Park in St. Louis. This would, however be West's only All-Star plate appearance, as he was injured (although not seriously) leaping for Luke Appling's double off the wall in the second inning and had to leave the game.

West finished 26th in voting for the 1940 NL MVP, and 27th in voting for the 1942 NL MVP. In March 1943, West joined the Army Air Force, serving with the Sixth Ferrying Group, Air Transport Command at Long Beach, California, where he regularly played baseball with (the aforementioned) Ruffing, Jerry Priddy and Nanny Fernandez.

In April 1946, after returning from military service, West was traded to the Cincinnati Reds for Jim Konstanty. He played just 73 games that year, batting .212. West was with San Diego of the Pacific Coast League in 1947, returned to Pittsburgh in 1948 (where he batted just .178 in 87 games) and returned to San Diego the following year. West led the Pacific Coast League in home runs on three occasions, and in 1949 he hit 48 home runs with 166 RBIs. He continued playing in the PCL until 1954.

In seven seasons, West played in 824 Games and had 2,676 At Bats, 338 Runs, 681 Hits, 136 Doubles, 20 Triples, 77 Home Runs, 380 RBI, 19 Stolen Bases, 353 Walks, .254 Batting Average, .344 On-base percentage, .407 Slugging percentage, 1,088 Total bases and 15 Sacrifice hits.

West operated a sporting goods firm with Ralph Kiner in California after retiring from baseball.

West died in Sierra Madre, California from brain cancer at the age of 87.

== Sources ==
- Career statistics from Baseball Reference · Retrosheet · Baseball Almanac
- Media related to Max West at Wikimedia Commons
