= Buddy Gremp =

American baseball player (1919-1995)

- First baseman
- Born: August 5, 1919; Denver, Colorado, U.S.
- Died: January 30, 1995 (aged 75); Manteca, California, U.S.
- Batted: Right Threw: Right

MLB debut
- September 13, 1940, for the Boston Bees

Last MLB appearance
- September 26, 1942, for the Boston Braves

MLB statistics
- Batting average: .223
- Home runs: 3
- Runs batted in: 31
- Stats at Baseball Reference

Teams
- Boston Bees/Braves (1940–1942)

Lewis Edward "Buddy" Gremp (August 5, 1919 – January 20, 1995) was an American professional baseball player who played infield in the Major Leagues from 1940 to 1942. He played for the Boston Braves.
