= Johnny Walker (baseball) =

American baseball player (1896–1976)

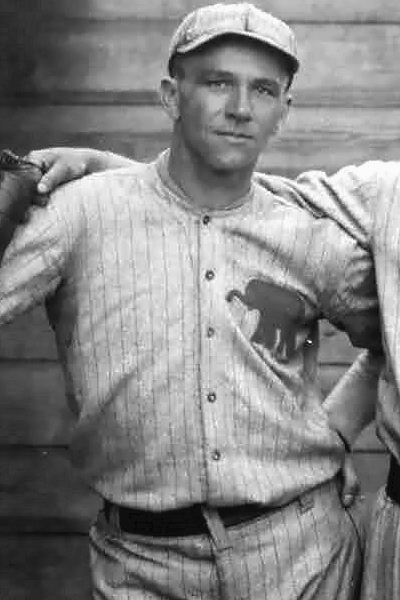
- First baseman/Catcher
- Born: December 11, 1896; Toulon, Illinois
- Died: August 19, 1976 (aged 79); Hollywood, Florida
- Batted: Right Threw: Right

MLB debut
- September 19, 1919, for the Philadelphia Athletics

Last MLB appearance
- October 2, 1921, for the Philadelphia Athletics

MLB statistics
- Batting average: .251
- Home runs: 2
- Runs batted in: 51
- Stats at Baseball Reference

Teams
- Philadelphia Athletics (1919–1921)

John Miles Walker (December 11, 1896 – August 19, 1976) was a Major League Baseball first baseman and catcher. Walker played with the Philadelphia Athletics from 1919 to 1921 and was the full-time first baseman during much of the 1921 season. He batted and threw right-handed. He was notorious for drinking Johnnie Walker on his way out to bat. Notoriously leading to the MLB's only "drunken home run", leading to some Philadelphia residents referring to walking home from the bar as "Johnny-walkin' home".
