= Nanny Fernandez =

American baseball player (1918–1996)

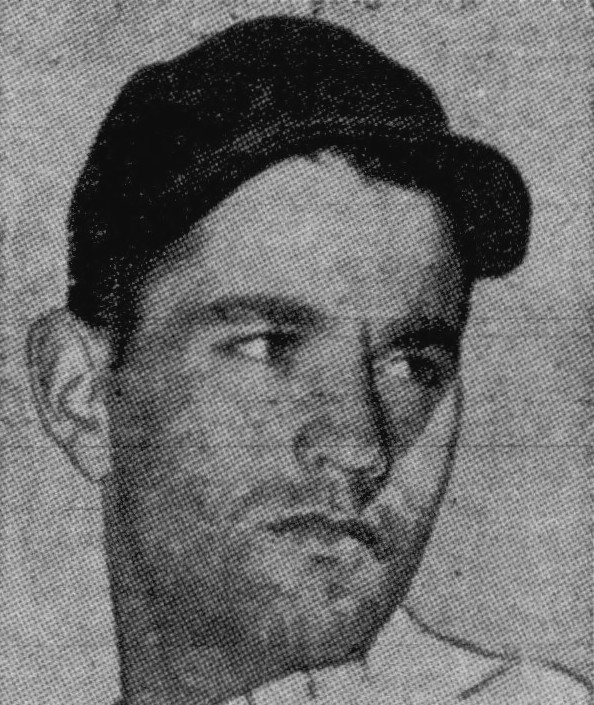
- Fernandez, circa 1942
- Third baseman
- Born: October 25, 1918; Wilmington, California, U.S.
- Died: September 19, 1996 (aged 77); Harbor City, California, U.S.
- Batted: Right Threw: Right

MLB debut
- April 14, 1942, for the Boston Braves

Last MLB appearance
- July 9, 1950, for the Pittsburgh Pirates

MLB statistics
- Batting average: .248
- Home runs: 16
- Runs batted in: 145
- Stats at Baseball Reference

Teams
- Boston Braves (1942, 1946–1947); Pittsburgh Pirates (1950)

Froilan "Nanny" Fernandez (October 25, 1918 – September 19, 1996) was an American professional baseball player.

Fernandez played all, or part of, four seasons in the Major Leagues, primarily as a third baseman, although he also saw significant time as a shortstop and outfielder. He played for the Boston Braves in 1942 and, after serving in World War II, 1946 and 1947. After two seasons in the minor leagues, he returned to the majors in 1950 with the Pittsburgh Pirates. After spending the 1951 season with the Indianapolis Indians, the Pirates' top farm team, he spent three seasons in the Pacific Coast League with the Seattle Rainiers and Sacramento Solons.
