= Philadelphia Phillies all-time roster (E–F) =

List of baseball players

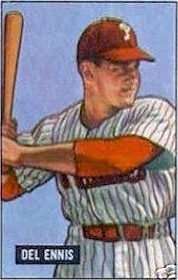
Del Ennis, a member of the Philadelphia Baseball Wall of Fame, hit 259 home runs during his 11 seasons with the Phillies.

The Philadelphia Phillies are a Major League Baseball team based in Philadelphia, Pennsylvania. They are a member of the Eastern Division of Major League Baseball's National League. The team has played officially under two names since beginning play in 1883: the current moniker, as well as the "Quakers", which was used in conjunction with "Phillies" during the team's early history. The team was also known unofficially as the "Blue Jays" during the World War II era. Since the franchise's inception, 2,081 players have made an appearance in a competitive game for the team, whether as an offensive player (batting and baserunning) or a defensive player (fielding, pitching, or both).

Of those 2,081 Phillies, 32 have had surnames beginning with the letter E, and 79 beginning with the letter F. Three of those players have been inducted into the Baseball Hall of Fame: second baseman Johnny Evers, who played for the Phillies during the 1917 season; right fielder Elmer Flick, who played four seasons for Philadelphia; and first baseman Jimmie Foxx, who was a Phillie during the 1945 season. Two players, Foxx and Del Ennis, are members of the Philadelphia Baseball Wall of Fame. During his 11-season career with Philadelphia (1946–1956), right fielder Ennis, a member of the 1950 team nicknamed the Whiz Kids, notched 634 extra-base hits and scored 891 runs. Foxx was inducted into the Wall of Fame for his contributions as a member of the Philadelphia Athletics.

Among the 59 batters in this list, left fielder Spoke Emery has the highest batting average, at .667; he hit safely two times in three career at-bats with Philadelphia. Other players with an average over .300 include Jim Eisenreich (.324 in four seasons), Flick (.338 in four seasons), Lew Fonseca (.319 in one season), and Ed Freed (.303 in one season). Ennis leads all members of this list in home runs and runs batted in, with 259 and 1,124, respectively. Flick's 29 home runs lead those players whose surnames start with F, although he had nearly twice as many triples (57); and he is followed closely by Pedro Feliz (26 home runs). Flick also leads those batters in runs batted in, with 377 in four years.

Of this list's 54 pitchers, six pitchers share the best win–loss record, in terms of winning percentage. Paul Erickson won two games for the Phillies without losing any, and five pitchers sport a 1–0 record: Tom Edens, Sergio Escalona, Paul Fletcher, Dana Fillingim, and Foxx, who pitched in nine games for the Phillies despite being primarily a first baseman. Flaherty owns the lowest earned run average (ERA), having appeared in one game, pitching 1/3 inning and allowing no runs for an ERA of 0.00. Among the pitchers who have allowed runs, the best ERAs belong to Foxx and Steve Fireovid, who each have an average of 1.59 earned runs allowed per game. Scott Eyre's 1.62 earned run average from his two seasons with Philadelphia are the best among the pitchers whose surnames begin with E. Jumbo Elliott (36 wins and 205 strikeouts) and Charlie Ferguson (99 wins and 728 strikeouts) are tops in those categories among their respective lists; the latter is also one of the ten Phillies pitchers who have thrown a no-hitter, doing so on August 29, 1885, the first in franchise history. Chick Fraser also accomplished the feat on September 18, 1903.

Two Phillies have made 30% or more of their Phillies appearances as both pitchers and position players. In addition to Flaherty's statistics listed above, Harry Felix batted .135 with two runs batted in as a third baseman while amassing a 4.85 ERA and striking out three as a pitcher.

Key to symbols in player list(s)
† or ‡	Indicates a member of the National Baseball Hall of Fame and Museum; ‡ indicates that the Phillies are the player's primary team^{[H]}
§	Indicates a member of the Philadelphia Baseball Wall of Fame
*	Indicates a team record^{[R]}
(#)	A number following a player's name indicates that the number was retired by the Phillies in the player's honor.
Year	Italic text indicates that the player is a member of the Phillies' active (25-man) roster.
Position(s)	Indicates the player's primary position(s)^{[P]}
Notes	Statistics shown only for playing time with Phillies^{[S]}
Ref	References

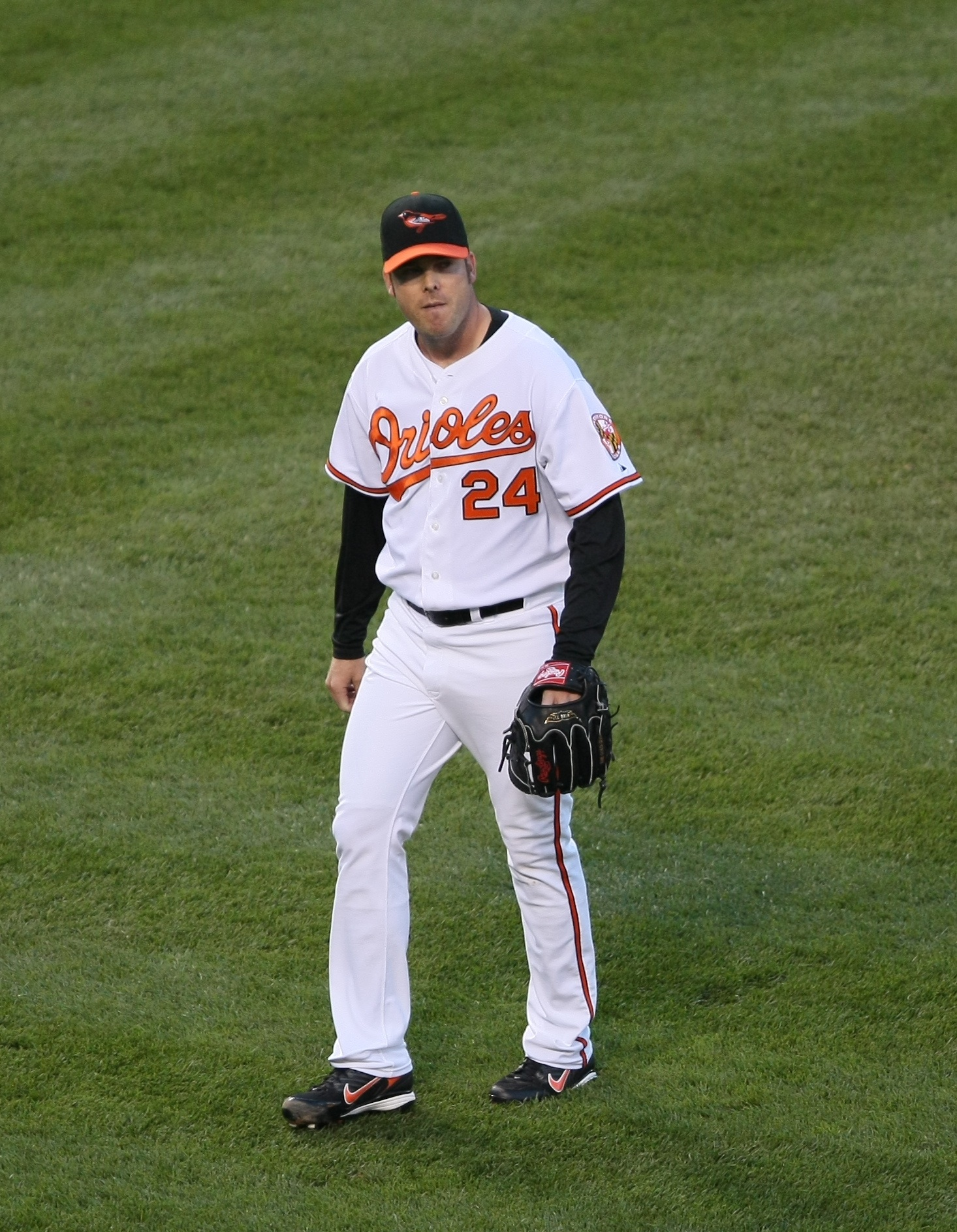
Adam Eaton pitched two seasons for the Phillies, striking out 154 batters.

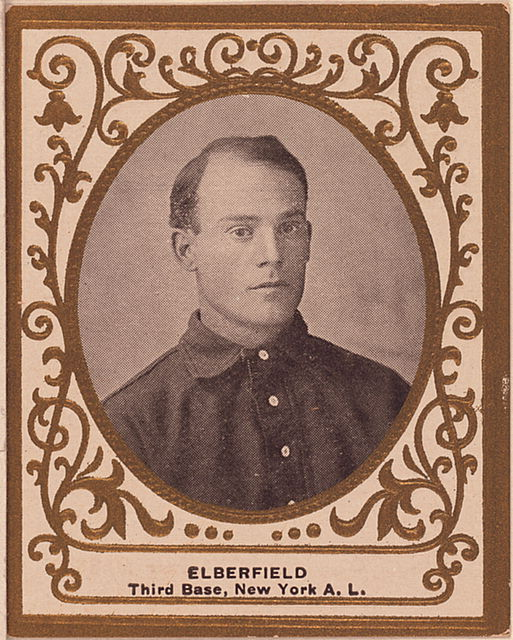
Third baseman Kid Elberfeld batted in seven runs in his only season with Philadelphia.

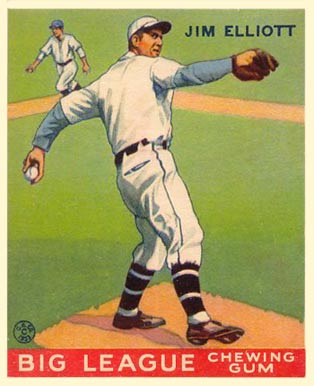
Jumbo Elliott was the Phillies' starting pitcher on Opening Day in 1934.

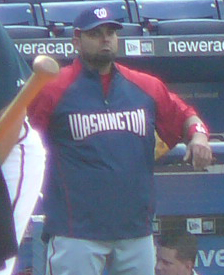
Johnny Estrada batted .222 in two season as Philadelphia's catcher.

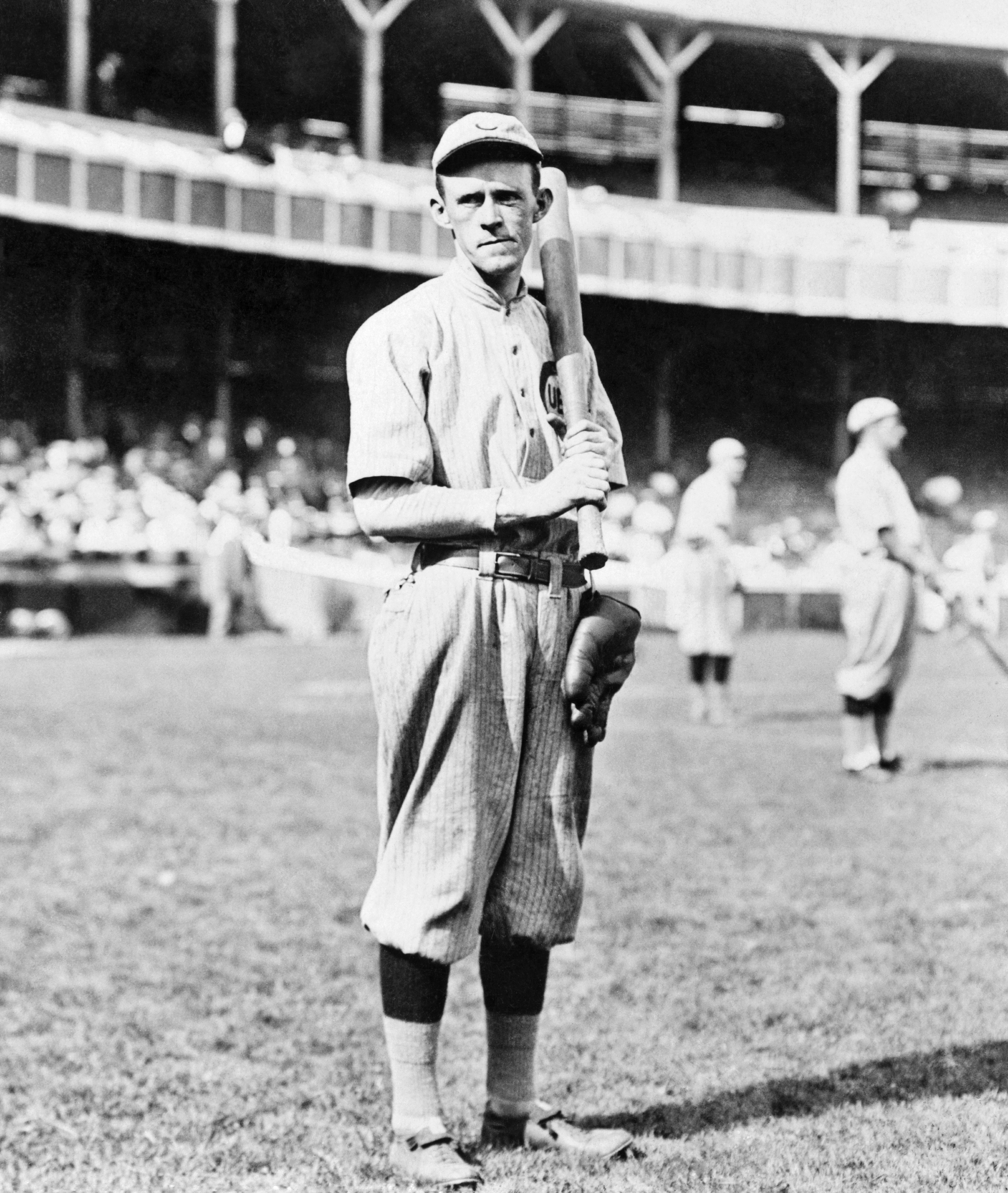
Second baseman Johnny Evers is one of three players immortalized in the poem Baseball's Sad Lexicon.

List of players whose surnames begin with E, showing season(s) and position(s) played and selected statistics
Name	Season(s)	Position(s)	Notes	Ref
Mike Easler	1987	Left fielder	.282 batting average; 1 home run; 10 runs batted in	
John Easton	1955; 1959	Pinch hitter	.000 batting average; 4 plate appearances	
Rawly Eastwick	1978–1979	Pitcher	5–7 record; 4.61 earned run average; 61 strikeouts	
Adam Eaton	2007–2008	Pitcher	14–18 record; 6.10 earned run average; 154 strikeouts	
Tom Edens	1994	Pitcher	1–0 record; 2.25 earned run average; 1 strikeout	
Doc Edwards	1970	Catcher	.269 batting average; 21 hits; 6 runs batted in	
Jim Eisenreich	1993–1996	Right fielder	.324 batting average; 24 home runs; 193 runs batted in	
Kid Elberfeld	1898	Third baseman	.237 batting average; 4 doubles; 7 runs batted in	
Hal Elliott	1929–1932	Pitcher	11–24 record; 6.95 earned run average; 90 strikeouts	
Jumbo Elliott	1931–1934	Pitcher	36–35 record; 4.53 earned run average; 205 strikeouts	
Ben Ellis	1896	Third baseman Shortstop	.063 batting average; 1 single; 19 plate appearances	
Dick Ellsworth	1967	Pitcher	6–7 record; 4.38 earned run average; 45 strikeouts	
Kevin Elster	1995	Shortstop	.208 batting average; 1 home run; 9 runs batted in	
Cal Emery	1963	First baseman	.158 batting average; 2 singles; 1 double	
Spoke Emery	1924	Left fielder	.667 batting average; 2 hits; 3 plate appearances	
Del Ennis^{§}	1946–1956	Left fielder Right fielder	.286 batting average; 259 home runs; 1,124 runs batted in	
John Ennis	2007	Pitcher	8.22 earned run average; 8 strikeouts; 3 walks	
Johnny Enzmann	1920	Pitcher	2–3 record; 3.84 earned run average; 35 strikeouts	
Don Erickson	1958	Pitcher	0–1 record; 4.63 earned run average; 9 strikeouts	
Paul Erickson	1948	Pitcher	2–0 record; 5.19 earned run average; 5 strikeouts	
Sergio Escalona	2009	Pitcher	1–0 record; 4.61 earned run average; 10 strikeouts	
Duke Esper	1890–1892	Pitcher	36–21 record; 3.47 earned run average; 171 strikeouts	
Nino Espinosa	1979–1981	Pitcher	19–22 record; 4.18 earned run average; 123 strikeouts	
Chuck Essegian	1958	Left fielder	.246 batting average; 5 home runs; 16 runs batted in	
Jim Essian	1973–1975	Catcher	.125 batting average; 3 hits; 1 run batted in	
Bobby Estalella	1996–1999	Catcher	.218 batting average; 14 home runs; 34 runs batted in	
Johnny Estrada	2001–2002	Catcher	.222 batting average; 8 home runs; 39 runs batted in	
Nick Etten	1941–1942; 1947	First baseman	.288 batting average; 23 home runs; 128 runs batted in	
Johnny Evers^{†}	1917	Second baseman	.224 batting average; 1 home run; 12 runs batted in	
Bob Ewing	1910–1911	Pitcher	16–15 record; 3.42 earned run average; 114 strikeouts	
Scott Eyre	2008–2009	Pitcher	5–1 record; 1.62 earned run average; 40 strikeouts	
George Eyrich	1943	Pitcher	3.38 earned run average; 5 strikeouts; 9 walks	

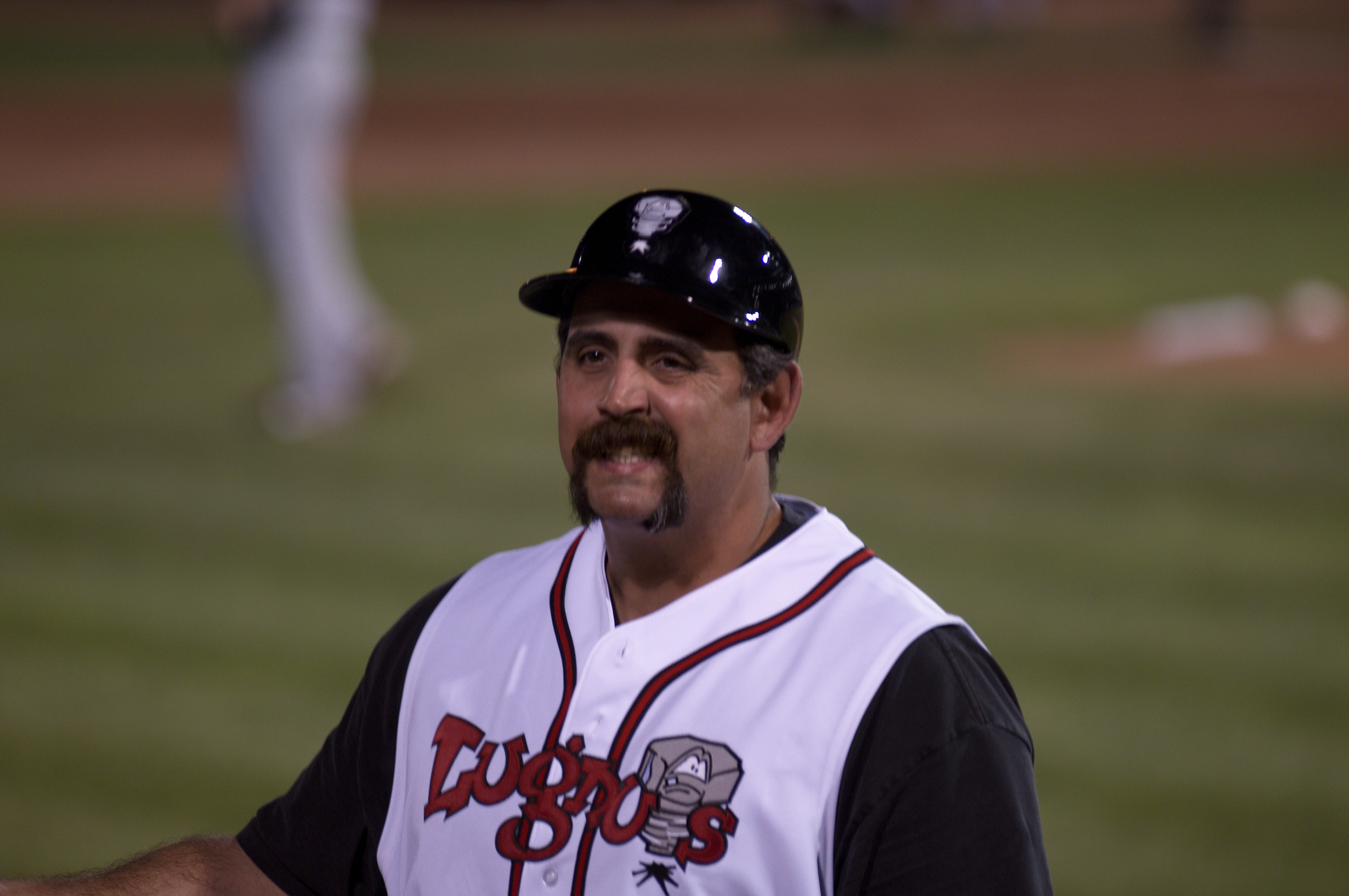
Sal Fasano batted .243 in three seasons with Philadelphia.

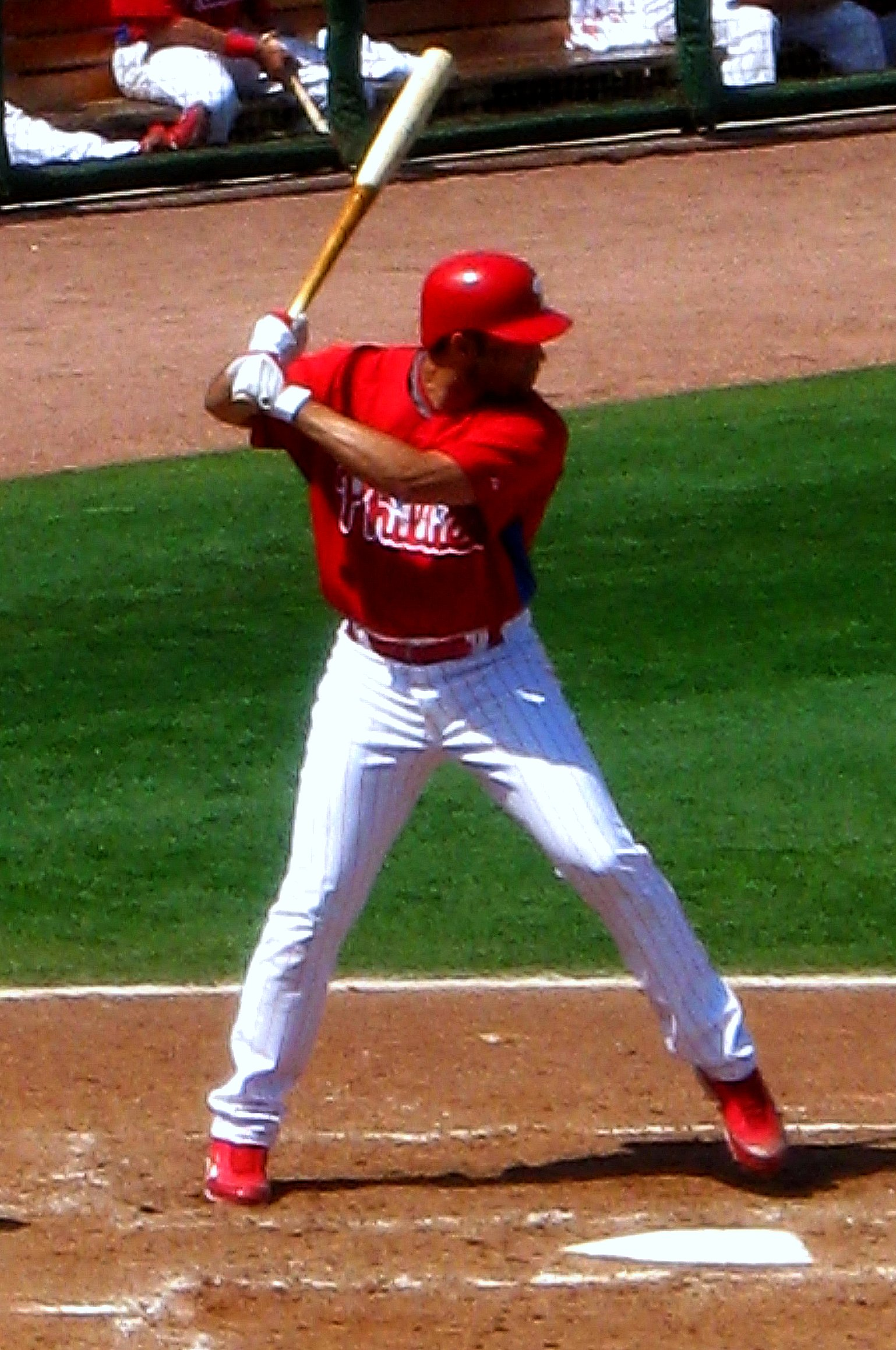
Third baseman Pedro Feliz hit 26 home runs in his two Phillies seasons.

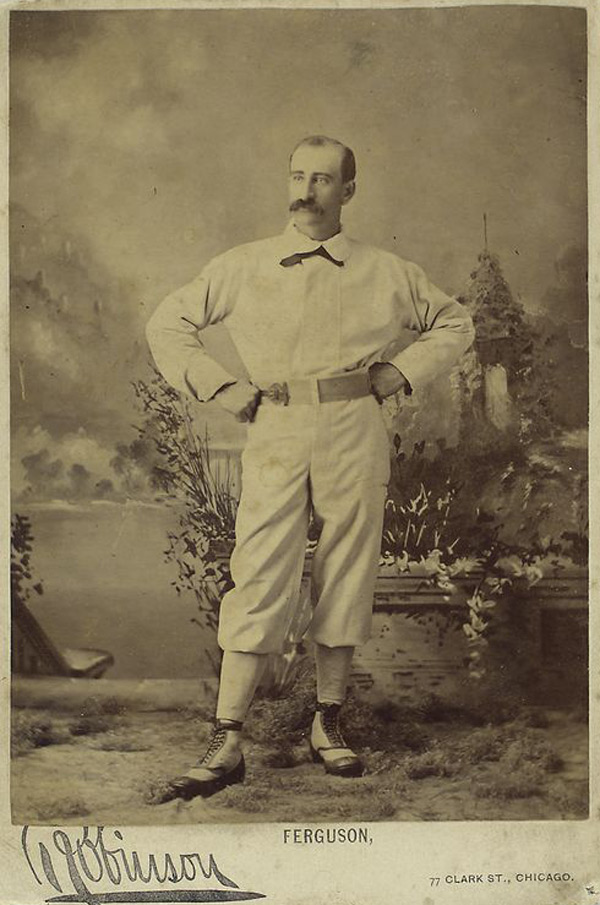
Bob Ferguson earned his nickname "Death to Flying Things" for his infield defense.

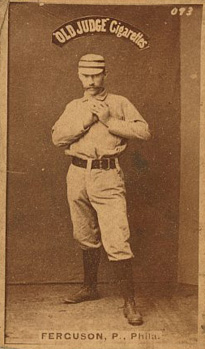
Charlie Ferguson leads all members of this list with 99 victories in four seasons with Philadelphia.

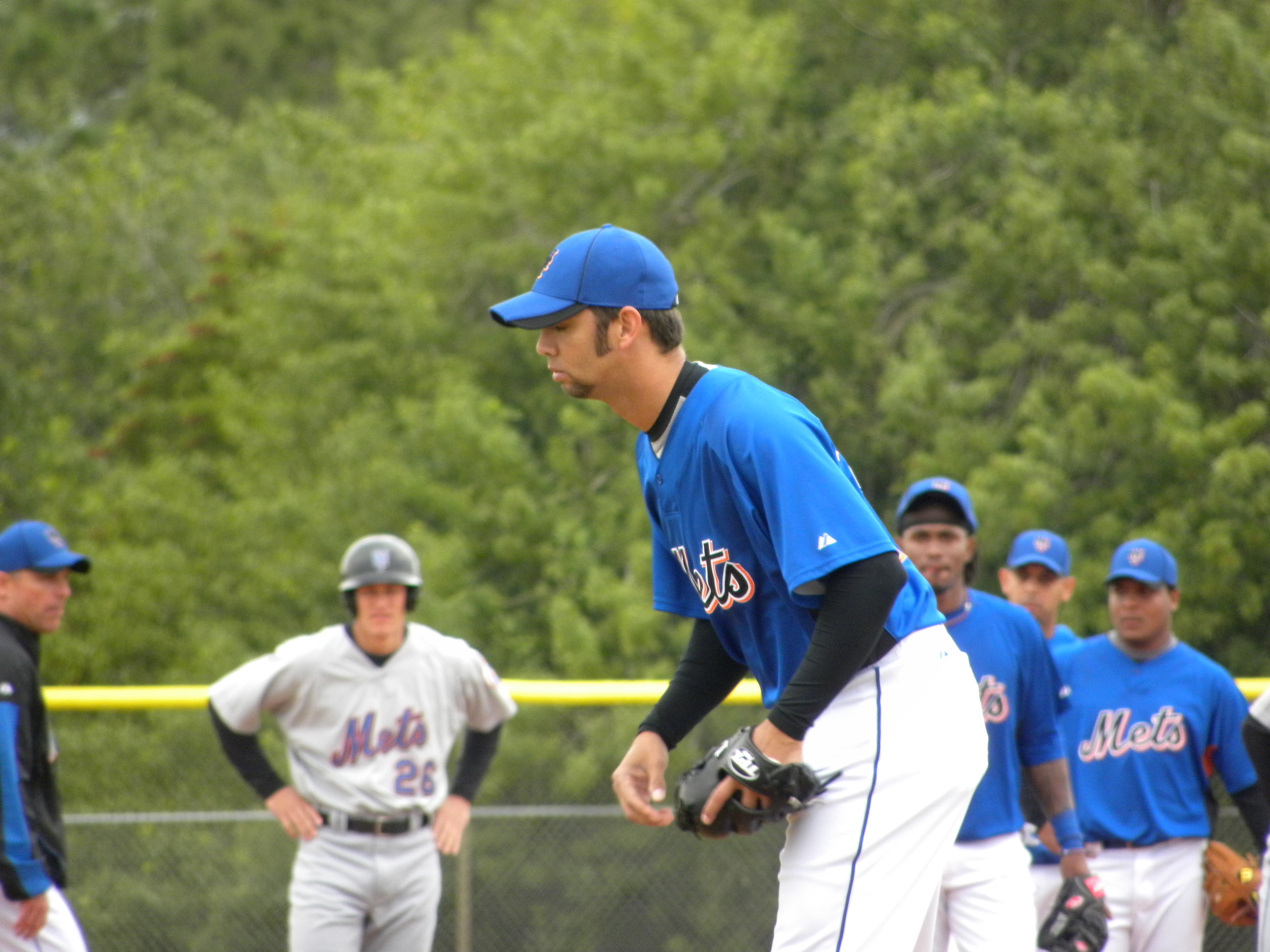
Nelson Figueroa won six games and lost six in two seasons with the Phillies.

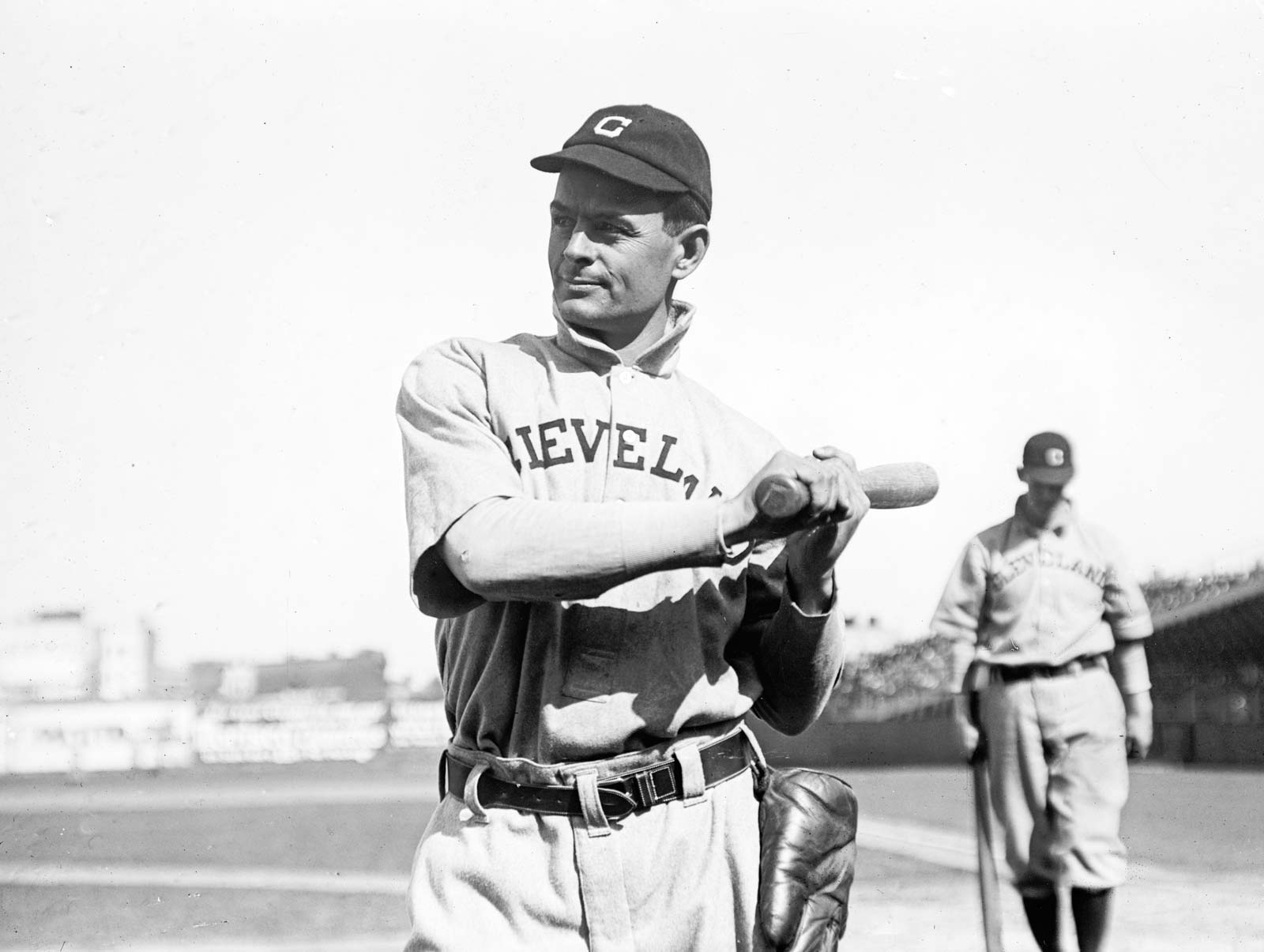
Hall of Famer Elmer Flick played outfield for the Phillies from 1898–1900.

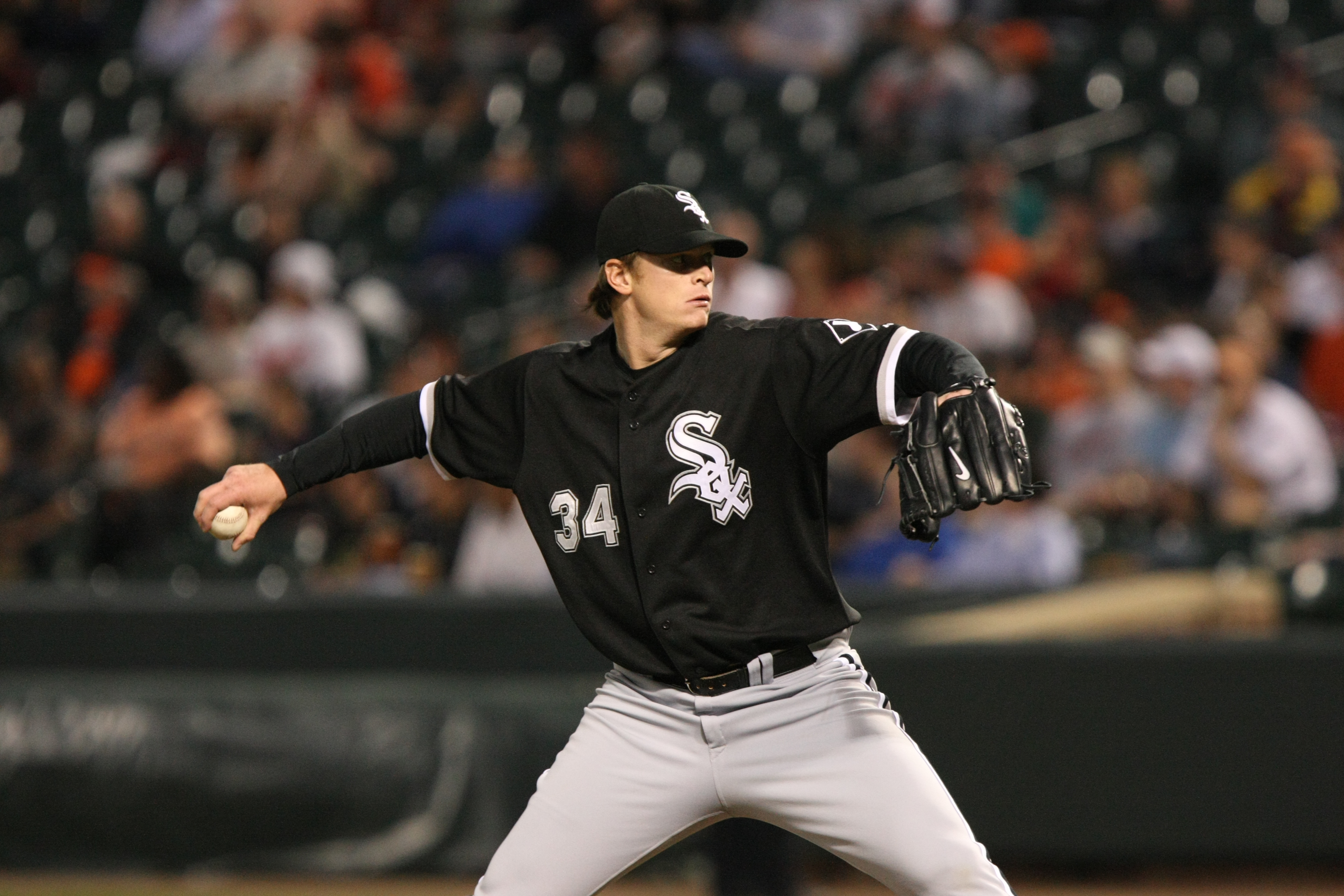
Gavin Floyd, a first round draft pick of the Phillies, struck out 75 batters in 3 seasons with Philadelphia.

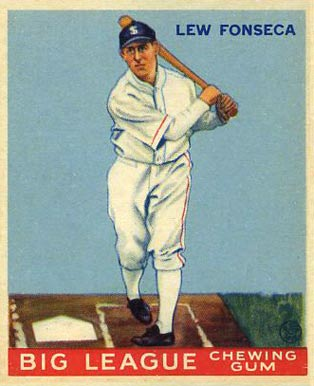
Lew Fonseca played more than 30% of his games with the Phillies at both first base and second base.

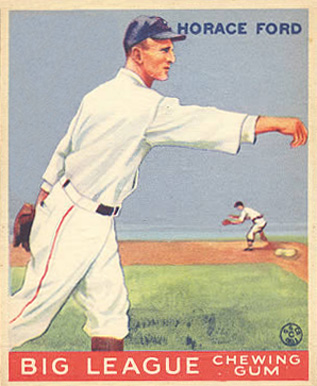
Hod Ford batted .272 in his only season in Philadelphia.

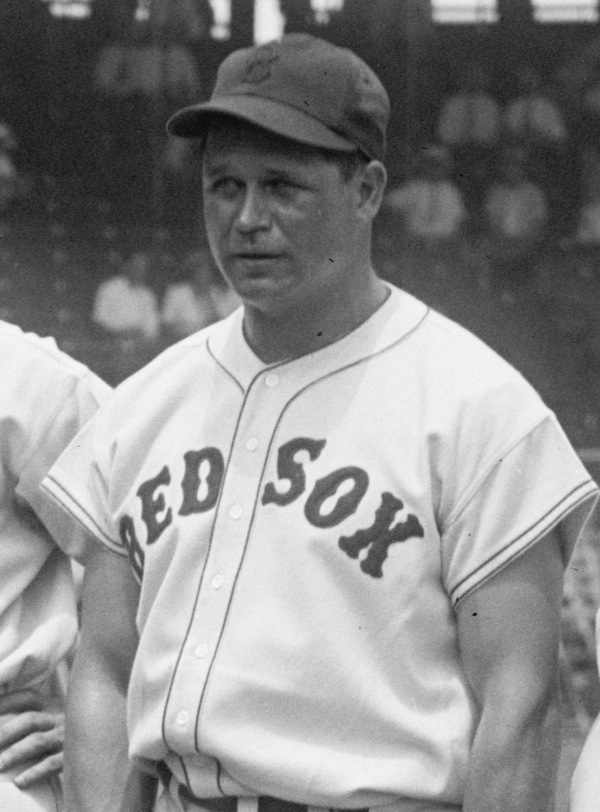
Jimmie Foxx was inducted into the Philadelphia Baseball Wall of Fame as a member of the Philadelphia Athletics.

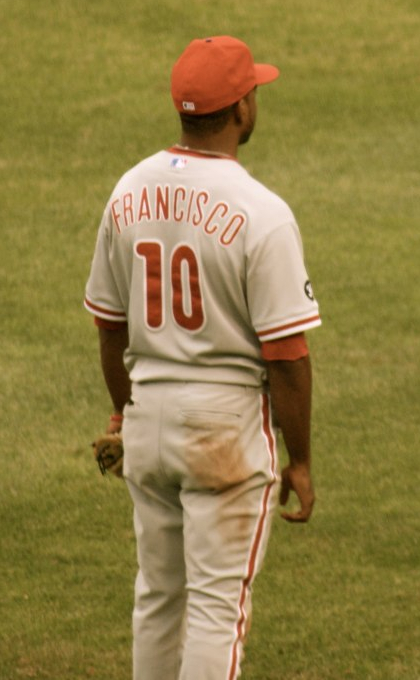
Ben Francisco hit 11 home runs in his first two Phillies seasons.

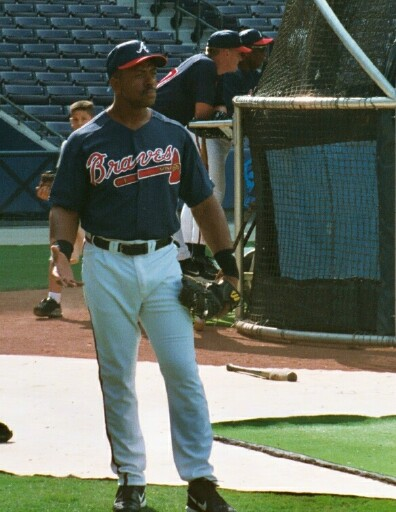
Julio Franco hit one double in his only year with Philadelphia.

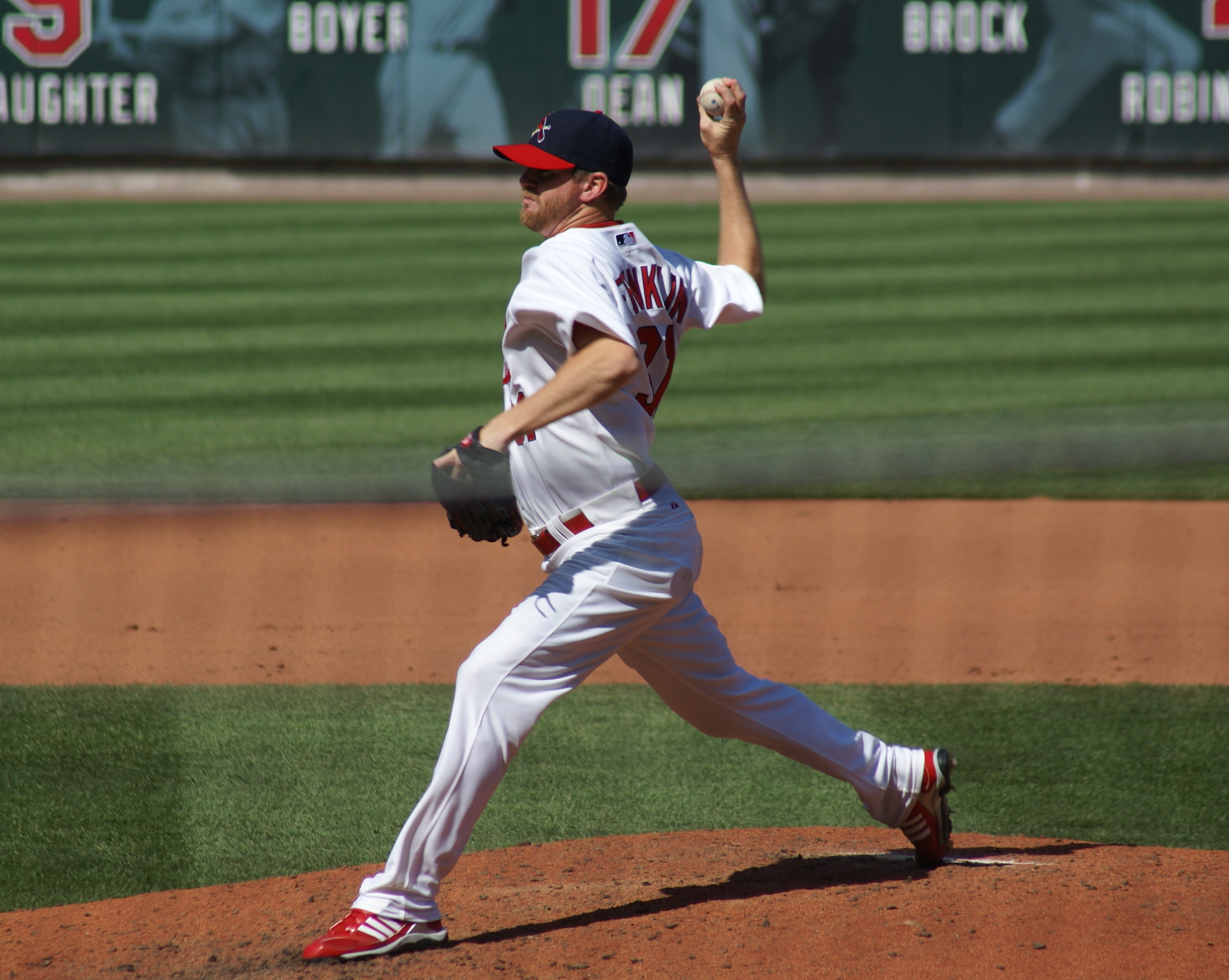
Ryan Franklin posted a 4.58 earned run average during the 2006 season.

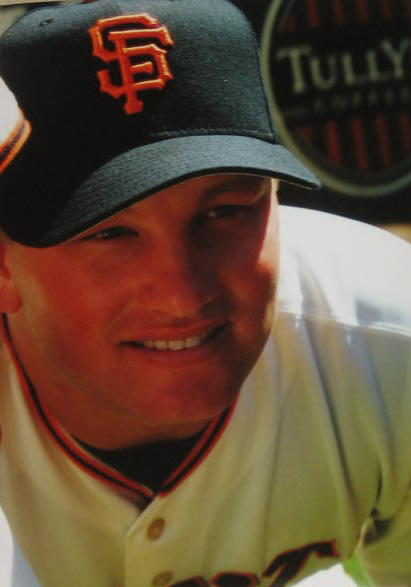
Aaron Fultz won seven games against one loss in his two seasons as a Phillie.

List of players whose surnames begin with F, showing season(s) and position(s) played and selected statistics
Name	Season(s)	Position(s)	Notes	Ref
Rags Faircloth	1919	Pitcher	9.00 earned run average; 2 hits allowed; 2 innings pitched	
Ed Fallenstein	1931	Pitcher	7.13 earned run average; 15 strikeouts; 26 walks	
Jack Fanning	1894	Pitcher	1–3 record; 8.91 earned run average; 7 strikeouts	
Ed Farmer	1974; 1982–1983	Pitcher	4–13 record; 5.93 earned run average; 94 strikeouts	
Sid Farrar	1883–1889	First baseman	.253 batting average; 17 home runs; 343 runs batted in	
Jack Farrell	1886	Second baseman	.183 batting average; 1 triple; 3 runs batted in	
Turk Farrell	1956–1961; 1967–1969	Pitcher	47–41 record; 3.25 earned run average; 403 strikeouts; 65 saves	
Sal Fasano	2006	Catcher	.243 batting average; 4 home runs; 10 runs batted in	
Eddie Feinberg	1938–1939	Shortstop; Second baseman	.184 batting average; 1 double; 2 runs scored	
Harry Felix	1902	Pitcher; Third baseman	1–3 record; 5.60 earned run average; .135 batting average; 2 runs batted in	
Pedro Feliz	2008–2009	Third baseman	.259 batting average; 26 home runs; 140 runs batted in	
Alex Ferguson	1927–1929	Pitcher	14–28 record; 5.46 earned run average; 127 strikeouts	
Bob Ferguson	1883	Second baseman	.258 batting average; 9 doubles; 27 runs batted in	
Charlie Ferguson	1884–1887	Pitcher	99–64 record; 2.67 earned run average; 728 strikeouts	
Chico Fernández	1957–1959	Shortstop	.242 batting average; 11 home runs; 105 runs batted in	
Sid Fernandez	1995–1996	Pitcher	9–7 record; 3.38 earned run average; 156 strikeouts	
Don Ferrarese	1961–1962	Pitcher	5–13 record; 3.96 earned run average; 95 strikeouts	
John Fick	1944	Pitcher	3.38 earned run average; 2 strikeouts; 3 walks	
Jocko Fields	1891	Catcher	.233 batting average; 2 doubles; 5 runs batted in	
Jack Fifield	1897–1899	Pitcher	19–35 record; 4.44 earned run average; 77 strikeouts	
Frank Figgemeier	1894	Pitcher	0–1 record; 11.25 earned run average; 2 strikeouts	
Nelson Figueroa	2001; 2010	Pitcher	6–6 record; 3.83 earned run average; 76 strikeouts	
Sam File	1940	Shortstop	.077 batting average; 1 run batted in; 13 plate appearances	
Dana Fillingim	1925	Pitcher	1–0 record; 10.38 earned run average; 2 strikeouts	
Bob Finley	1943–1944	Catcher	.251 batting average; 2 home runs; 28 runs batted in	
Neal Finn	1933	Second baseman	.237 batting average; 4 doubles; 13 runs batted in	
Happy Finneran	1912–1913	Pitcher	0–2 record; 2.98 earned run average; 10 strikeouts	
Lou Finney	1947	Pinch hitter^{[a]}	.000 batting average; 4 plate appearances	
Steve Fireovid	1984	Pitcher	1.59 earned run average; 3 strikeouts; 5 2/3 innings pitched	
Ike Fisher	1898	Catcher	.115 batting average; 1 double; 1 stolen base	
Paul Fittery	1917	Pitcher	1–1 record; 4.53 earned run average; 13 strikeouts	
Mike Fitzgerald	1918	Left fielder Right fielder	.293 batting average; 8 doubles; 6 runs batted in	
Wally Flager	1945	Shortstop	.250 batting average; 2 home runs; 15 runs batted in	
Patsy Flaherty	1910	Center fielder Pitcher	.500 batting average; 1 hit; 0.00 earned run average; 1/3 inning pitched	
Tom Fleming	1902; 1904	Right fielder	.273 batting average; 6 singles; 2 runs batted in	
Art Fletcher	1920; 1922	Shortstop	.288 batting average; 11 home runs; 91 runs batted in	
Darrin Fletcher	1990–1991	Catcher	.215 batting average; 1 home run; 13 runs batted in	
Frank Fletcher	1914	Pinch hitter^{[b]}	.000 batting average; 1 plate appearance; 1 strikeout	
Paul Fletcher	1993; 1995	Pitcher	1–0 record; 5.27 earned run average; 10 strikeouts	
Elmer Flick^{†}	1898–1901	Right fielder	.338 batting average; 57 triples; 377 runs batted in	
Hilly Flitcraft	1942	Pitcher	8.10 earned run average; 1 strikeout; 2 walks	
Kevin Flora	1995	Center fielder	.213 batting average; 2 home runs; 7 runs batted in	
Ben Flowers	1956	Pitcher	0–2 record; 5.71 earned run average; 22 strikeouts	
Gavin Floyd	2004–2006	Pitcher	7–5 record; 6.95 earned run average; 75 strikeouts	
Jim Fogarty	1884–1889	Right fielder Center fielder	.247 batting average; 49 triples; 262 runs batted in; 289 stolen bases	
Tom Foley	1985–1986	Shortstop	.274 batting average; 3 home runs; 22 runs batted in	
Lew Fonseca	1925	Second baseman First baseman	.319 batting average; 7 home runs; 60 runs batted in	
Barry Foote	1977–1978	Catcher	.180 batting average; 2 home runs; 7 runs batted in	
P. J. Forbes	2001	Second baseman	.286 batting average; 2 hits; 1 run batted in	
Curt Ford	1989–1990	Right fielder Left fielder	.206 batting average; 1 home run; 13 runs batted in	
Hod Ford	1924	Second baseman	.272 batting average; 3 home runs; 53 runs batted in	
Gary Fortune	1916; 1918	Pitcher	0–3 record; 7.50 earned run average; 13 strikeouts	
Kevin Foster	1993	Pitcher	0–1 record; 14.85 earned run average; 6 strikeouts	
Henry Fox	1902	Pitcher	18.00 earned run average; 1 strikeout; 1 walk	
Howie Fox	1952	Pitcher	2–7 record; 5.08 earned run average; 16 strikeouts	
Terry Fox	1966	Pitcher	3–2 record; 4.47 earned run average; 22 strikeouts	
Bill Foxen	1908–1910	Pitcher	15–19 record; 2.48 earned run average; 122 strikeouts	
Jimmie Foxx^{†§}	1945	First baseman	.268 batting average; 7 home runs; 38 runs batted in	
Ben Francisco	2009–2011	Left fielder Center fielder	.259 batting average; 17 home runs; 75 runs batted in	
Julio Franco	1982	Shortstop	.276 batting average; 1 double; 3 runs batted in	
Tito Francona	1967	First baseman	.205 batting average; 1 double; 3 runs batted in	
Ryan Franklin	2006	Pitcher	1–5 record; 4.58 earned run average; 25 strikeouts	
Chick Fraser	1899–1900; 1902–1904	Pitcher	74–75 record; 3.53 earned run average; 454 strikeouts	
Ed Freed	1942	Center fielder	.303 batting average; 3 doubles; 1 run batted in	
Roger Freed	1971–1972	Right fielder	.222 batting average; 12 home runs; 55 runs batted in	
Marvin Freeman	1986; 1988–1990	Pitcher	4–5 record; 5.33 earned run average; 71 strikeouts	
Gene Freese	1959	Third baseman	.268 batting average; 23 home runs; 70 runs batted in	
Steve Frey	1995–1996	Pitcher	0–1 record; 3.80 earned run average; 14 strikeouts	
Bernie Friberg	1925–1932	Second baseman	.274 batting average; 20 home runs; 245 runs batted in	
Fred Frink	1934	Center fielder	0 plate appearances; 2 games played	
Larry Fritz	1975	Pinch hitter^{[c]}	.000 batting average; 1 plate appearance	
Al Froehlich	1909	Catcher	.000 batting average; 1 plate appearance	
Todd Frohwirth	1987–1990	Pitcher	3–3 record; 3.95 earned run average; 60 strikeouts	
Charlie Frye	1940	Pitcher	0–6 record; 4.65 earned run average; 18 strikeouts	
Woodie Fryman	1968–1972	Pitcher	46–52 record; 3.76 earned run average; 571 strikeouts	
Charlie Fuchs	1943	Pitcher	2–7 record; 4.29 earned run average; 12 strikeouts	
Chick Fullis	1933–1934	Center fielder	.298 batting average; 37 doubles; 57 runs batted in	
Aaron Fultz	2005–2006	Pitcher	7–1 record; 3.38 earned run average; 116 strikeouts	
Dave Fultz	1898–1899	Left fielder	.200 batting average; 2 doubles; 5 runs batted in	

== Footnotes ==
Key

- ^{H} The National Baseball Hall of Fame and Museum determines which cap a player wears on their plaque, signifying "the team with which he made his most indelible mark". The Hall of Fame considers the player's wishes in making their decision, but the Hall makes the final decision as "it is important that the logo be emblematic of the historical accomplishments of that player's career".
- ^{P} Players are listed at a position if they appeared in 30% of their games or more during their Phillies career, as defined by Baseball-Reference.com. Additional positions may be shown on the Baseball-Reference website by following each player's citation.
- ^{R} Franchise batting and pitching leaders are drawn from Baseball-Reference.com. A total of 1,500 plate appearances are needed to qualify for batting records, and 500 innings pitched or 50 decisions are required to qualify for pitching records.
- ^{S} Statistics are correct as of the end of the 2010 Major League Baseball season.
