= List of Philadelphia Phillies Opening Day starting pitchers =

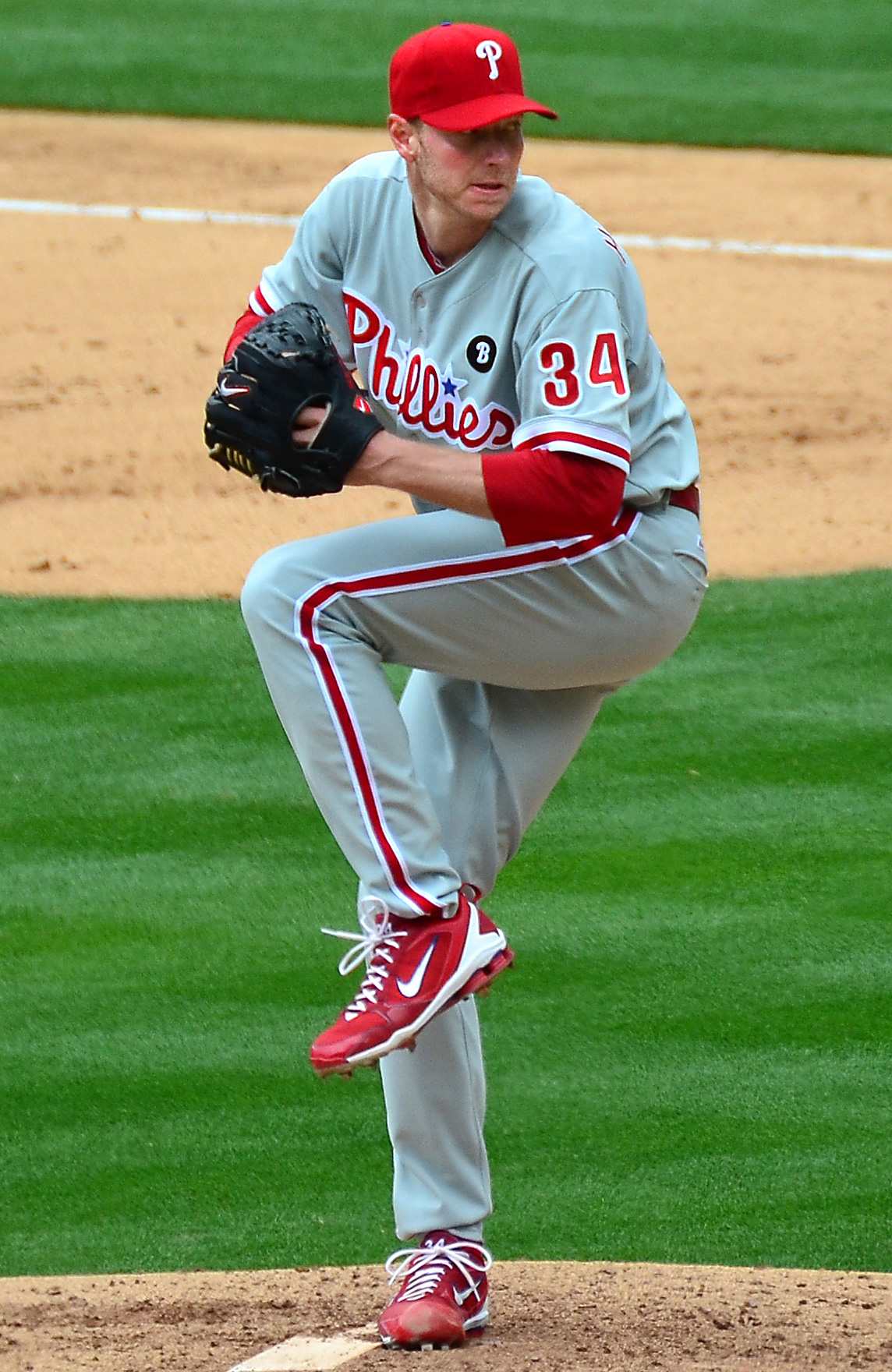
Roy Halladay made his second consecutive Opening Day start for the Phillies in 2011 against the Houston Astros.

The Philadelphia Phillies are a Major League Baseball franchise based in Philadelphia. They play in the National League East division. Also known in early franchise history as the "Philadelphia Quakers", the Phillies have used 72 different Opening Day starting pitchers in their 128 seasons. The first game of the new baseball season for a team is played on Opening Day, and being named the Opening Day starter is an honor, which is often given to the player who is expected to lead the pitching staff that season, though there are various strategic reasons why a team's best pitcher might not start on Opening Day. Where decisions are known, the 72 starters have a combined Opening Day record of 33 wins, 40 losses and 20 no decisions (33–40–20); where decisions are unknown, the team's record was 17–19. No decisions are awarded to the starting pitcher if the game is won or lost after the starting pitcher has left the game. It can also result if a starting pitcher does not pitch five full innings, even if his team retains the lead and wins.

Hall of Fame left-handed pitcher Steve Carlton has the most Opening Day starts for the Phillies, with 14, compiling a record of 3–9–2. He is followed by Robin Roberts (twelve starts; 5–6–1), Chris Short (six starts; 3–1–2), and Aaron Nola (six starts; 3–2–1).

Roberts holds the Phillies' record for most wins in Opening Day starts with five. Art Mahaffey has the best record in Opening Day starts for the franchise; though many players have won their only Opening Day start, Mahaffey started and won two Opening Day games, for a winning percentage of 1.000; Roy Halladay also has a 1.000 winning percentage, with two wins and a no decision in three starts. Conversely, George McQuillan is the only player to have a .000 winning percentage in more than one Opening Day start (0–2–0 in two starts). Brett Myers has a .000 winning percentage in his three starts, but has accumulated two no decisions (0–1–2). Carlton has the most Opening Day losses for the team, with nine.

The Phillies have played in six home ballparks. Their best overall Opening Day record is at Shibe Park (also known as Connie Mack Stadium), where they won 11 Opening Day games out of 14 played there (11–3). The team also owned an 8–17 Opening Day record at Baker Bowl (initially known as the Philadelphia Baseball Grounds), with 1 tie. Recreation Park's Opening Day record is 1–2, while Veterans Stadium has the lowest winning percentage (.200), with 2 wins and 8 losses. The Phillies currently play at Citizens Bank Park, where they are 2–5 on Opening Day.

The Phillies have played in seven World Series championships in their history, winning in 1980 and 2008. Carlton won his Opening Day start against the Montreal Expos in 1980, while Myers received a no-decision against the same franchise (now the Washington Nationals) in 2008, a game that the Phillies eventually lost, and lost the opening game against the Atlanta Braves in 2009. Carlton also started Opening Day in 1983, the year that the Phillies lost to the Baltimore Orioles in the World Series. Alexander started Opening Day in 1915, the Phillies' first World Series appearance, while Roberts started the first game of 1950, and Terry Mulholland the first game of 1993.

== Key ==
Season (#)	Each year is linked to an article about the Major League Baseball season; numbers indicate the game number during that Opening Day, in the case of a doubleheader.
Final score (#)	Game score with winning team's runs listed first; extra innings in parentheses
Location	Stadium in italics denotes a Phillies' home game
Pitcher (#)	Number of appearances as the Phillies' Opening Day starter
W	Win
L	Loss
T	Tie
ND (W or L)	No decision by starting pitcher; game result in parentheses
(W or L)	Game result in parentheses; information about decision unavailable
*	Advanced to the postseason
§	Won the National League Championship Series
†	Won the World Series

== Starting pitchers ==
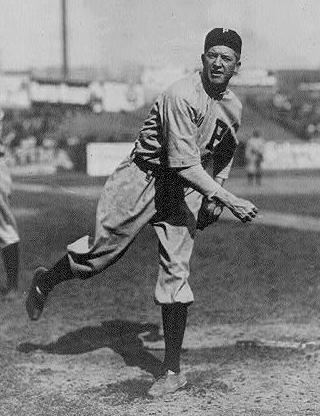
Grover Cleveland Alexander (team 4–1 in five Opening Day starts)

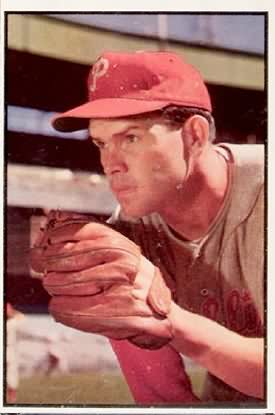
Robin Roberts (5–6–1 in 12 Opening Day starts)

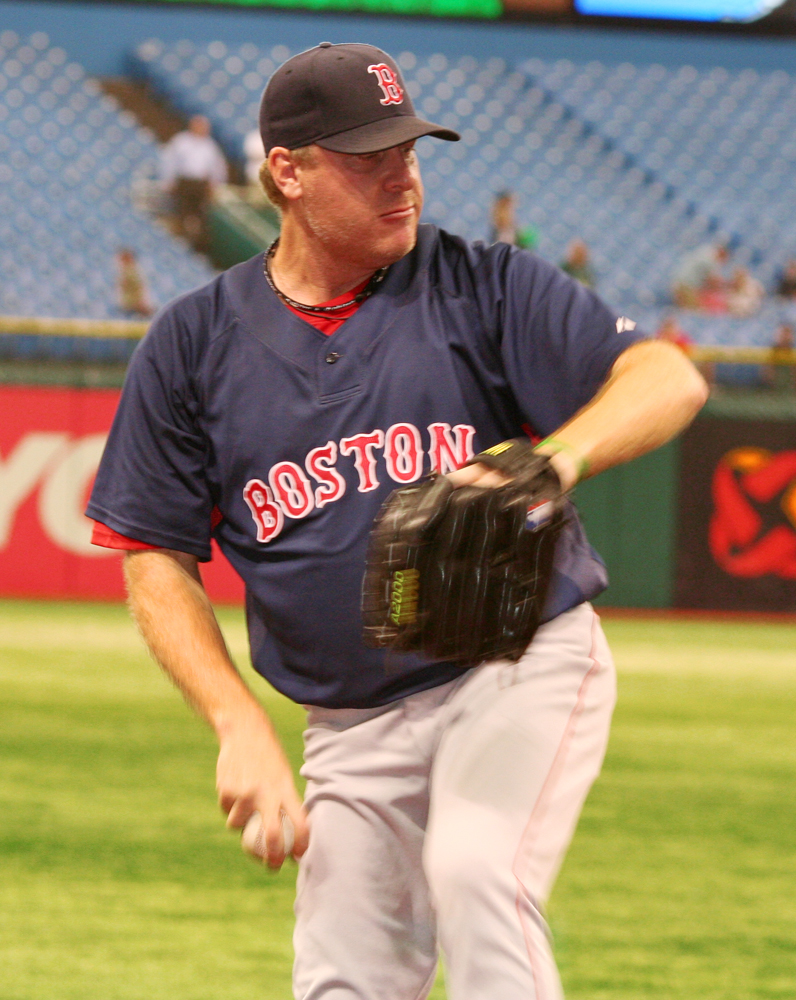
Curt Schilling (2–0–3 in five Opening Day starts)

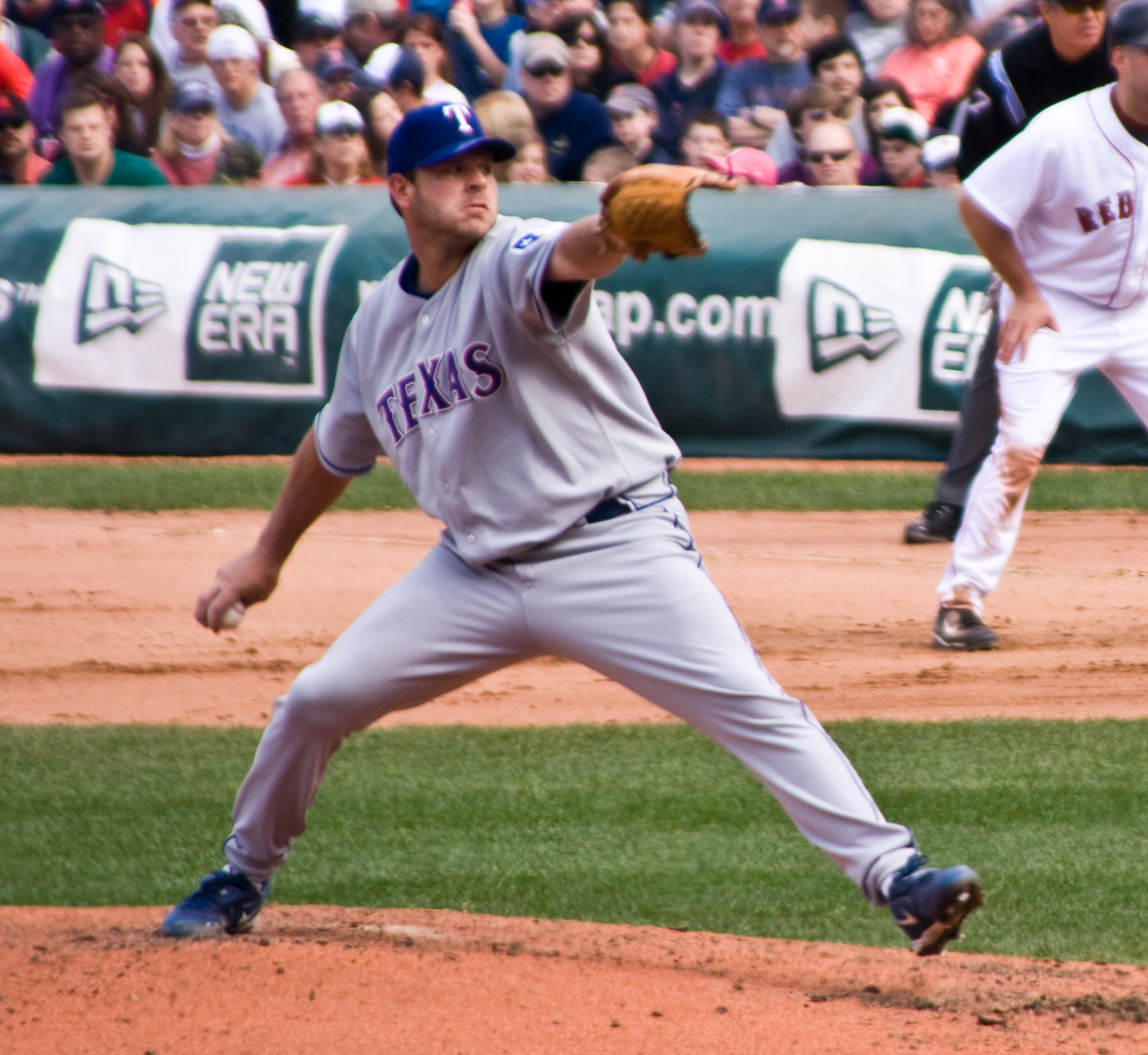
Kevin Millwood (1–1 in two Opening Day starts)

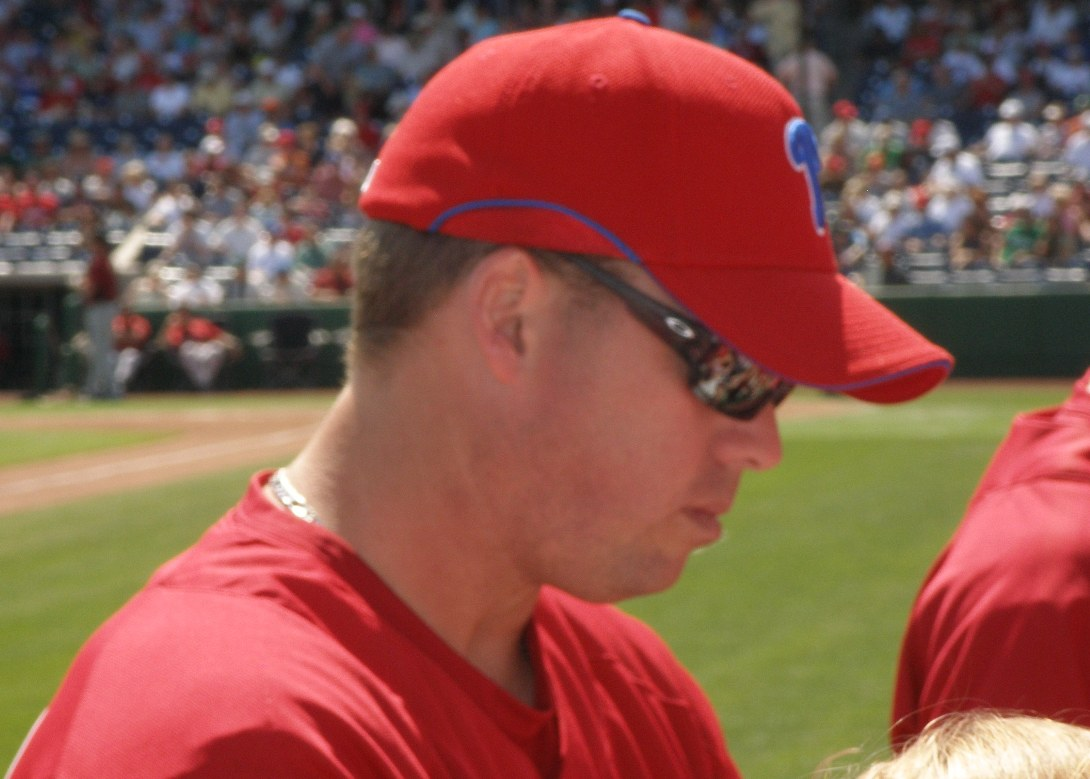
Jon Lieber (1–1 in two Opening Day starts)

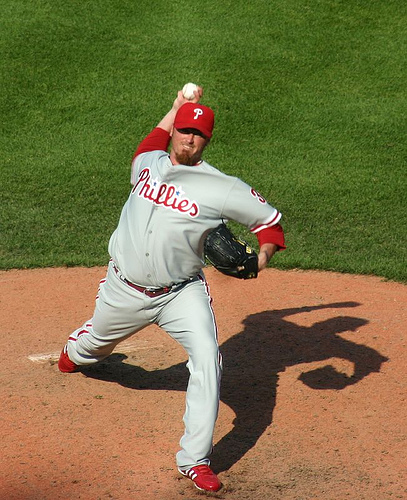
Brett Myers was the Opening Day starter for the Phillies in 2007, 2008, and 2009, with a record of 0–1–2.

Season	Pitcher	Decision	Final score	Opponent	Location	Ref(s)
1883	John Coleman (1)	(L)	4–3	Providence Grays	Recreation Park	
1884	Charlie Ferguson (1)	(W)	13–2	Detroit Wolverines	Recreation Park	
1885	Charlie Ferguson (2)	(L)	8–2	Providence Grays	Recreation Park	
1886	Dan Casey (1)	(L)	6–3	Washington Nationals	Swampoodle Grounds	
1887	Ed Daily (1)	(L)	4–3	New York Giants	Polo Grounds I	
1888	Kid Gleason (1)	(L)	4–3	Boston Beaneaters	South End Grounds II	
1889	Charlie Buffinton (1)	(W)	8–4	Washington Nationals	Swampoodle Grounds	
1890	Kid Gleason (2)	(W)	4–0	New York Giants	Polo Grounds II	
1891	Kid Gleason (3)	(L)	14–8	Brooklyn Grooms	Philadelphia Baseball Grounds	
1892	Tim Keefe (1)	(L)	5–4	New York Giants	Philadelphia Baseball Grounds	
1893	Gus Weyhing (1)	(W)	7–5	Brooklyn Grooms	Philadelphia Baseball Grounds	
1894	Gus Weyhing (2)	(L)	4–2	Washington Senators	Boundary Field	
1895	Jack Taylor (1)	(W)	7–6	Baltimore Orioles (NL)	Union Park	
1896	Jack Taylor (2)	(L)	7–3	Boston Beaneaters	Baker Bowl	
1897	Al Orth (1)	(W)	6–5	Boston Beaneaters	South End Grounds III	
1898	Red Donahue (1)	(L)	7–6	New York Giants	Baker Bowl	
1899	Wiley Piatt (1)	(W)	6–5	Washington Senators	Baker Bowl	
1900	Al Orth (2)	(W)	19–17	Boston Beaneaters	South End Grounds III	
1901	Jack Dunn (1)	(L)	12–7	Brooklyn Superbas	Baker Bowl	
1902	Harry Felix (1)	(L)	7–0	New York Giants	Polo Grounds III	
1903	Chick Fraser (1)	(L)	8–3	Boston Beaneaters	Baker Bowl	
1904	Bill Duggleby (1)	(W)	6–2	Boston Beaneaters	Baker Bowl	
1905	Togie Pittinger (1)	(W)	12–8	Brooklyn Superbas	Washington Park III	
1906	Johnny Lush (1)	(L)	3–2	New York Giants	Baker Bowl	
1907	Frank Corridon (1)	(W)^{[b]}	3–0	New York Giants	Polo Grounds III	
1908	George McQuillan (1)	(L)	3–1	New York Giants	Baker Bowl	
1909	Harry Coveleski (1)	(L)	9–5	Boston Doves	South End Grounds III	
1910	George McQuillan (2)	(L)	2–0	Brooklyn Superbas	Baker Bowl	
1911	Earl Moore (1)	W	2–0	New York Giants	Polo Grounds IV	
1912	Grover Cleveland Alexander (1)	(L)	7–4	Boston Braves	South End Grounds III	
1913	Tom Seaton (1)	(W)	1–0	Brooklyn Superbas	Ebbets Field	
1914	Grover Cleveland Alexander (2)	(W)	10–1	New York Giants	Baker Bowl	
1915*	Grover Cleveland Alexander (3)	(W)	3–0	Boston Braves	Fenway Park	
1916	Grover Cleveland Alexander (4)	(W)	5–4	New York Giants	Baker Bowl	
1917	Grover Cleveland Alexander (5)	(W)	6–5	Brooklyn Robins	Ebbets Field	
1918	Erskine Mayer (1)	(W)	5–2	Boston Braves	Baker Bowl	
1919	Elmer Jacobs (1)	(L)	10–7	New York Giants	Baker Bowl	
1920	Eppa Rixey (1)	L	9–2	Brooklyn Robins	Ebbets Field	
1921	Jimmy Ring (1)	ND (L)	10–8 (11)	New York Giants	Baker Bowl	
1922	Lee Meadows (1)	W	7–1	Boston Braves	Braves Field	
1923	Bill Hubbell (1)	ND (T)^{[c]}	5–5	Brooklyn Robins	Ebbets Field	
1924	Jimmy Ring (2)	ND (T)^{[d]}	6–6 (11)	Boston Braves	Baker Bowl	
1925	Hal Carlson (1)	L	3–1	Brooklyn Robins	Ebbets Field	
1926	Hal Carlson (2)	W	6–3	Boston Braves	Baker Bowl	
1927	Hal Carlson (3)	L	15–7	New York Giants	Baker Bowl	
1928	Jimmy Ring (3)	W	4–3	Brooklyn Robins	Ebbets Field	
1929	Claude Willoughby (1)	L	11–9	New York Giants	Baker Bowl	
1930	Les Sweetland (1)	W	1–0	Brooklyn Robins	Ebbets Field	
1931	Hal Elliott (1)	L	9–5	New York Giants	Baker Bowl	
1932	Phil Collins (1)	W	13–5	New York Giants	Polo Grounds IV	
1933	Flint Rhem (1)	L	5–4	Brooklyn Robins	Baker Bowl	
1934	Jumbo Elliott (1)	L	6–1	New York Giants	Polo Grounds IV	
1935	Curt Davis (1)	L	12–3	Brooklyn Dodgers	Baker Bowl	
1936	Curt Davis (2)	W	4–1	Boston Braves	Baker Bowl	
1937 (1)^{[e]}	Syl Johnson (1)	ND (W)	2–1 (11)	Boston Braves	Braves Field	
1937 (2)^{[e]}	Bucky Walters (1)	W	1–0	Boston Braves	Braves Field	
1938	Wayne LaMaster (1)	ND (L)	12–5	Brooklyn Dodgers	Baker Bowl	
1939	Hugh Mulcahy (1)	ND (L)	7–6 (12)	Boston Braves	Braves Field	
1940	Kirby Higbe (1)	W	3–1	New York Giants	Polo Grounds IV	
1941	Cy Blanton (1)	W	6–5	Boston Braves	Shibe Park	
1942	Si Johnson (1)	L	2–1	Boston Braves	Shibe Park	
1943	Al Gerheauser (1)	L	11–4	Brooklyn Dodgers	Ebbets Field	
1944	Dick Barrett (1)	W	4–1	Brooklyn Dodgers	Shibe Park	
1945	Ken Raffensberger (1)	L	8–2	Brooklyn Dodgers	Ebbets Field	
1946	Oscar Judd (1)	L	8–4	New York Giants	Polo Grounds IV	
1947	Schoolboy Rowe (1)	W	4–3	New York Giants	Shibe Park	
1948	Dutch Leonard (1)	W	3–1	Boston Braves	Shibe Park	
1949	Ken Heintzelman (1)	W	4–0	Boston Braves	Braves Field	
1950*	Robin Roberts (1)	W	9–1	Brooklyn Dodgers	Shibe Park	
1951	Robin Roberts (2)	W	5–2	Brooklyn Dodgers	Ebbets Field	
1952	Robin Roberts (3)	L	5–3	New York Giants	Polo Grounds IV	
1953	Robin Roberts (4)	L	4–1	Brooklyn Dodgers	Connie Mack Stadium	
1954	Robin Roberts (5)	L	4–2	Pittsburgh Pirates	Forbes Field	
1955	Robin Roberts (6)	W	4–2	New York Giants	Connie Mack Stadium	
1956	Robin Roberts (7)	W	8–6	Brooklyn Dodgers	Ebbets Field	
1957	Robin Roberts (8)	L	7–6	Brooklyn Dodgers	Connie Mack Stadium	
1958	Robin Roberts (9)	ND (W)	5–4	Cincinnati Reds	Crosley Field	
1959	Robin Roberts (10)	W	2–1	Cincinnati Reds	Connie Mack Stadium	
1960	Robin Roberts (11)	L	9–4	Cincinnati Reds	Crosley Field	
1961	Robin Roberts (12)	L	6–2	Los Angeles Dodgers	Los Angeles Memorial Coliseum	
1962	Art Mahaffey (1)	W	12–4	Cincinnati Reds	Crosley Field	
1963	Art Mahaffey (2)	W	2–1	Cincinnati Reds	Connie Mack Stadium	
1964	Dennis Bennett (1)	ND (W)	5–3	New York Mets	Connie Mack Stadium	
1965	Chris Short (1)	W	2–0	Houston Astros	Astrodome	
1966	Chris Short (2)	ND (W)	3–2 (12)	St. Louis Cardinals	Busch Stadium I	
1967	Jim Bunning (1)	L	4–2	Chicago Cubs	Wrigley Field	
1968	Chris Short (3)	W	2–0	Los Angeles Dodgers	Dodger Stadium	
1969	Chris Short (4)	ND (L)	7–6	Chicago Cubs	Wrigley Field	
1970	Chris Short (5)	W	2–0	Chicago Cubs	Connie Mack Stadium	
1971	Chris Short (6)	L	4–2	Pittsburgh Pirates	Three Rivers Stadium	
1972	Steve Carlton (1)	W	4–2	Chicago Cubs	Wrigley Field	
1973	Steve Carlton (2)	L	3–0	New York Mets	Shea Stadium	
1974	Steve Carlton (3)	ND (W)	5–4	New York Mets	Veterans Stadium	
1975	Steve Carlton (4)	L	2–1	New York Mets	Shea Stadium	
1976*	Jim Kaat (1)	ND (L)	5–4	Pittsburgh Pirates	Veterans Stadium	
1977*	Steve Carlton (5)	L	4–3	Montreal Expos	Veterans Stadium	
1978*	Steve Carlton (6)	L	5–1	St. Louis Cardinals	Veterans Stadium	
1979	Steve Carlton (7)	L	8–1	St. Louis Cardinals	Busch Stadium II	
1980^{†}	Steve Carlton (8)	W	6–3	Montreal Expos	Veterans Stadium	
1981*	Steve Carlton (9)	ND (L)	3–2	Cincinnati Reds	Riverfront Stadium	
1982	Steve Carlton (10)	L	7–2	New York Mets	Veterans Stadium	
1983^{§}	Steve Carlton (11)	L	2–0	New York Mets	Shea Stadium	
1984	Steve Carlton (12)	W	5–0	Atlanta Braves	Atlanta–Fulton County Stadium	
1985	Steve Carlton (13)	L	6–0	Atlanta Braves	Veterans Stadium	
1986	Steve Carlton (14)	L	7–4	Cincinnati Reds	Riverfront Stadium	
1987	Shane Rawley (1)	L	6–0	Atlanta Braves	Atlanta–Fulton County Stadium	
1988	Shane Rawley (2)	L	5–3	Pittsburgh Pirates	Veterans Stadium	
1989	Floyd Youmans (1)	L	5–3	Chicago Cubs	Wrigley Field	
1990	Bruce Ruffin (1)	ND (L)	2–1	Chicago Cubs	Wrigley Field	
1991	Terry Mulholland (1)	L	2–1	New York Mets	Shea Stadium	
1992	Terry Mulholland (2)	L	4–3	Chicago Cubs	Veterans Stadium	
1993^{§}	Terry Mulholland (3)	W	3–1	Houston Astros	Astrodome	
1994	Curt Schilling (1)	ND (W)	12–6	Colorado Rockies	Mile High Stadium	
1995	Curt Schilling (2)	ND (L)	7–6	St. Louis Cardinals	Busch Stadium II	
1996	Sid Fernandez (1)	L	5–3	Colorado Rockies	Veterans Stadium	
1997	Curt Schilling (3)	W	3–0	Los Angeles Dodgers	Dodger Stadium	
1998	Curt Schilling (4)	ND (L)	1–0 (14)	New York Mets	Shea Stadium	
1999	Curt Schilling (5)	W	7–4	Atlanta Braves	Turner Field	
2000	Andy Ashby (1)	L	6–4	Arizona Diamondbacks	Bank One Ballpark	
2001	Omar Daal (1)	ND (W)	6–5 (13)	Florida Marlins	Pro Player Stadium	
2002	Robert Person (1)	L	7–2	Atlanta Braves	Turner Field	
2003	Kevin Millwood (1)	W	8–5	Florida Marlins	Pro Player Stadium	
2004	Kevin Millwood (2)	L	2–1	Pittsburgh Pirates	PNC Park	
2005	Jon Lieber (1)	W	8–4	Washington Nationals	Citizens Bank Park	
2006	Jon Lieber (2)	L	13–5	St. Louis Cardinals	Citizens Bank Park	
2007*	Brett Myers (1)	ND (L)	5–3	Atlanta Braves	Citizens Bank Park	
2008^{†}	Brett Myers (2)	ND (L)	11–6	Washington Nationals	Citizens Bank Park	
2009^{§}	Brett Myers (3)	L	4–1	Atlanta Braves	Citizens Bank Park	
2010*	Roy Halladay (1)	W	11–1	Washington Nationals	Nationals Park	
2011*	Roy Halladay (2)	ND (W)	5–4	Houston Astros	Citizens Bank Park	
2012	Roy Halladay (3)	W	1–0	Pittsburgh Pirates	PNC Park	
2013	Cole Hamels (1)	L	7–5	Atlanta Braves	Turner Field	
2014	Cliff Lee (1)	W	14–10	Texas Rangers	Globe Life Park in Arlington	
2015	Cole Hamels (2)	L	8–0	Boston Red Sox	Citizens Bank Park	
2016	Jeremy Hellickson (1)	ND (L)	2–6	Cincinnati Reds	Great American Ball Park	
2017	Jeremy Hellickson (2)	W	4–3	Cincinnati Reds	Great American Ball Park	
2018	Aaron Nola (1)	ND (L)	5–8	Atlanta Braves	SunTrust Park	
2019	Aaron Nola (2)	W	10–4	Atlanta Braves	Citizens Bank Park	
2020	Aaron Nola (3)	L	2–5	Miami Marlins	Citizens Bank Park	
2021	Aaron Nola (4)	ND (W)	3–2 (10)	Atlanta Braves	Citizens Bank Park	
2022^{§}	Aaron Nola (5)	W	9–5	Oakland Athletics	Citizens Bank Park	
2023*	Aaron Nola (6)	ND (L)	7–11	Texas Rangers	Globe Life Field	
2024*	Zack Wheeler	ND (L)	3–9	Atlanta Braves	Citizens Bank Park	
2025*	Zack Wheeler (2)	ND (W)	7–3 (10)	Washington Nationals	Nationals Park	
2026*	Cristopher Sánchez	W	5–3	Texas Rangers	Citizens Bank Park	

== Footnotes ==
- ^{b} In 1907, the Giants forfeited the opening day game to the Phillies, who won 3–0.
- ^{c} In 1923, the opening day game ended in a tie with the Brooklyn Robins, 5–5. The teams played again the following day, with the Robins defeating the Phillies, 6–5.
- ^{d} In 1924, the opening day game ended in a tie with the Boston Braves, 6–6. The teams played again the following day, with the Braves defeating the Phillies, 4–3, in 10 innings.
- ^{e} In 1937, the Phillies played the Boston Braves in a doubleheader on Opening Day, winning both games. Reliever Syl Johnson started game one, but did not factor in the decision, as the game went to 11 innings. Starter Bucky Walters won game two.

== See also ==
- List of Philadelphia Phillies seasons
- List of Philadelphia Phillies managers
