= Elmer Miller =

Elmer Miller may refer to:

- Elmer Miller (outfielder) (1890–1944), American baseball player for the St. Louis Cardinals, New York Yankees, and Boston Red Sox
- Elmer Miller (pitcher) (1903–1987), American baseball player for the Philadelphia Phillies
- Elmer S. Miller (b. 1931) anthropologist and author specializing in the Gran Chaco
