= Jon Lieber =

American baseball player (born 1970)

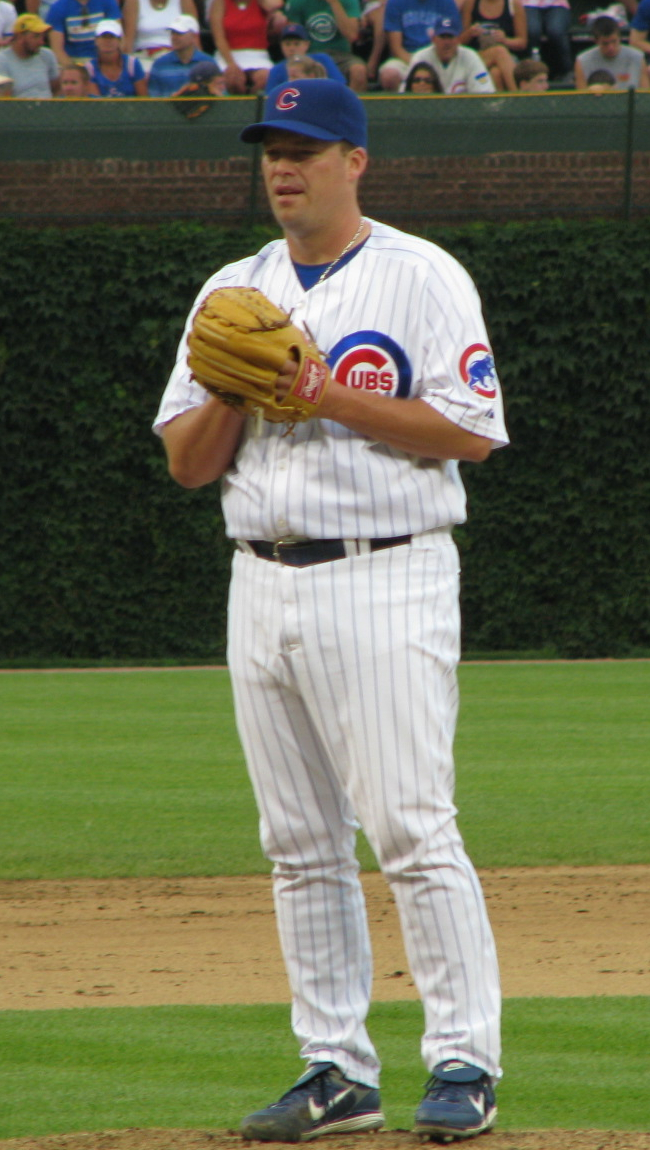
- Lieber with the Cubs
- Pitcher
- Born: April 2, 1970 (age 56); Council Bluffs, Iowa, U.S.
- Batted: Left Threw: Right

MLB debut
- May 15, 1994, for the Pittsburgh Pirates

Last MLB appearance
- September 5, 2008, for the Chicago Cubs

MLB statistics
- Win–loss record: 131–124
- Earned run average: 4.27
- Strikeouts: 1,553
- Stats at Baseball Reference

Teams
- Pittsburgh Pirates (1994–1998); Chicago Cubs (1999–2002); New York Yankees (2004); Philadelphia Phillies (2005–2007); Chicago Cubs (2008)

Career highlights and awards
- All-Star (2001)

Jonathan Ray Lieber (born April 2, 1970) is an American former professional baseball pitcher. He stands 6 feet 2 inches (1.88 m) tall and weighs 240 pounds (110 kg). He played in Major League Baseball (MLB) for the Pittsburgh Pirates (1994–1998), Chicago Cubs (1999–2002 and 2008), New York Yankees (2004), and Philadelphia Phillies (2005–2007). He batted left-handed and threw right-handed, and utilized a fastball, a slider, and a changeup for his pitches. In a 14-season career, Lieber compiled a 131–124 record with 1,553 strikeouts and a 4.27 ERA in 2,198 innings pitched.

Lieber attended the University of South Alabama, helping them win the Sun Belt Conference Championship. He was drafted by the Kansas City Royals in the second round of the 1992 Major League Baseball draft, but he was traded to the Pittsburgh Pirates the following season before even throwing a pitch in the major leagues. He made his debut in 1994 and was named the Pirates' Opening Day starter in 1995, but it was not until 1997 that he became a full-time major league starter. He was traded to the Chicago Cubs following the 1998 season. In 2000, he led the National League (NL) with 251 innings pitched. He had his best season in 2001, winning 20 games while losing just six. Lieber underwent Tommy John surgery in 2002 and missed the entire 2003 season. In 2004, he pitched for the New York Yankees, reaching the playoffs for the only time in his career. He signed with the Philadelphia Phillies in 2005 and tied for fifth in the NL with 17 wins. Injuries cut into his playing time over the next three years; he finished his career as a reliever with the Cubs in 2008.

== Biography ==
=== Early life ===
Lieber was born in Council Bluffs, Iowa. He graduated from Abraham Lincoln High School in Council Bluffs in 1988. Lieber attended Iowa Western Community College in 1989 and 1990 before transferring to the University of South Alabama. Lieber posted 12–5 records for South Alabama both of his years there, and he led the team in earned run average (ERA) and strikeouts both years. He was selected by the Chicago Cubs in the ninth round of the 1991 Major League Baseball (MLB) draft, but he did not sign. In 1992, he helped South Alabama win the Sun Belt Conference Championship.

Lieber received several honors following his senior season. These included the Sun Belt Conference Player of the Year award, a third-team All-America selection by the American Baseball Coaches Association, an all-region award, and an all-league award (his second). In 2013, he was inducted into the Mobile Sports Hall of Fame. He was drafted by the Kansas City Royals in the second round of the 1992 draft, and this time, he signed.

=== Minor Leagues (1992–94) ===
Lieber began his professional career with the A short season Eugene Emeralds of the Northwest League. In five starts with the Emeralds, he had a 3–0 record, a 1.16 ERA, 23 strikeouts, 2 walks, and 26 hits allowed in 31 innings pitched. He also appeared in seven games (six starts) for the Baseball City Royals of the A-Advanced Florida State League, posting a 3–3 record, a 4.65 ERA, 19 strikeouts, eight walks, and 45 hits allowed in 31 innings pitched.

In 1993, the Royals switched their A-Advanced affiliate to the Wilmington Blue Rocks of the Carolina League. Lieber began the season with Wilmington, posting a 9–3 record, a 2.67 ERA, 89 strikeouts, nine walks, 125 hits allowed, and 114 2/3 innings pitched in 17 games (16 starts). He was promoted to the AA Memphis Chicks of the Southern League on July 11, where he posted a 2–1 record and a 6.86 ERA in four starts. On July 31, seeking pitching help as they contended for the playoffs, the Royals traded Lieber and Dan Miceli to the Pittsburgh Pirates for their closer, Stan Belinda. The Pirates assigned Lieber to the Southern League's Carolina Mudcats; in six starts, he had a 4–2 record, a 3.97 ERA, 28 strikeouts, 10 walks, and 39 hits allowed in 34 innings pitched.

Lieber made three starts with the Mudcats in 1994, posting a 2–0 record, a 1.29 ERA, 21 strikeouts, two walks, and 13 hits allowed in 21 innings. He also made three starts for the Buffalo Bisons of the Triple-A American Association, posting a 1–1 record, a 1.69 ERA, 21 strikeouts, one walk, and 16 hits allowed in 21 1/3 innings pitched.

=== Pittsburgh Pirates (1994–98) ===
Lieber was called up by the Pirates in May 1994 to join their starting rotation, replacing Randy Tomlin, who was moved to the bullpen. In his first major league start on May 15, he gave up one run in six innings but took the loss as the Philadelphia Phillies defeated the Pirates 1–0. He earned his first career win five days later, pitching eight shutout innings in a 6–0 victory over the Montreal Expos. In 17 starts with the Pirates, Lieber had a 6–7 record, a 3.73 ERA, 71 strikeouts, 25 walks, and 116 hits allowed in 108 2/3 innings.

Following Lieber's rookie season, Pirates' manager Jim Leyland named Lieber the team's Opening Day starter for 1995. Like many of the young Pirates' pitchers that year, Lieber struggled; he was optioned to the Calgary Cannons of the Triple-A Pacific Coast League on June 18 after going 2–7 with a 7.48 ERA. In 14 starts with Calgary, Lieber had a 1–5 record, a 7.01 ERA, 34 strikeouts, 19 walks, and 122 hits allowed in 77 innings pitched. He was recalled by the Pirates on September 5 when rosters expanded but was used mostly as a relief pitcher for the rest of the year. In 21 games (12 starts), Lieber compiled a 4–7 record, a 6.32 ERA, 45 strikeouts, 14 walks, and 103 hits allowed in 72 2/3 innings pitched.

Lieber remained in the bullpen to begin the 1996 season. In his first 34 games, he posted a 4.21 ERA. In July, he returned to the starting rotation following the release of Zane Smith. As a starter, Lieber posted a 7–2 record with a 3.91 ERA, emerging as the Pirates' ace by the end of the year. In 51 games (15 starts) in 1996, Lieber posted a 9–5 record, a 3.99 ERA, 94 strikeouts, 28 walks, and 156 hits allowed in 142 innings pitched.

Lieber became the Pirates' Opening Day starter again in 1997. On June 30, he threw his only complete game of the year, striking out 10 while allowing one run on five hits in a 3–1 victory over the Chicago White Sox. Lieber was inconsistent in 1997, amassing several winning streaks and several losing streaks during the season. In 33 games (32 starts), he had an 11–14 record, a 4.49 ERA, 160 strikeouts, 51 walks, and 193 hits allowed in 188 1/3 innings pitched. He was third in the NL in losses (behind Mark Leiter's 17 and teammate Steve Cooke's 15); however, he tied Mike Hampton for the most runs batted in by a major league pitcher with eight.

In 1998, Lieber was the Pirates' fourth starter. He had a 5–10 record over his first 17 starts, partly because he received 15 total runs of support in the losses over that time. Lieber had an 8–13 record with a 3.90 ERA before getting placed on the disabled list (DL) for the first time in his career on August 21 due to a left oblique muscle strain. He returned from the DL on September 15 but posted a 10.80 ERA over his last two starts. In 29 games (28 starts), Lieber posted an 8–14 record, a 4.11 ERA, 138 strikeouts, 40 walks, and 182 hits allowed in 171 innings pitched. He was tied with seven other pitchers for fifth in the league in losses. Following the season, Lieber was traded to the Chicago Cubs for Brant Brown.

=== Chicago Cubs (1999–2002) ===
Lieber began 1999 as the Cubs' third starter. Prior to the All-Star break, he had an 8–3 record with a 3.26 ERA (seventh-best in the NL). From April 29 to May 8, he was on the DL with a right eye contusion. He threw his first major league shutout on May 14, striking out seven in a 9–0 victory over the Atlanta Braves. Lieber went 0–8 with a 5.71 ERA in his first 13 starts following the All-Star Break before earning wins in his final two starts of the year. In 31 starts, Lieber compiled a 10–11 record, a 4.07 ERA, and 46 walks in 203 1/3 innings pitched. He was tied for tenth in the league with 226 hits allowed (along with teammate Steve Trachsel), but he finished eighth in the league with 186 strikeouts and tied with six other players for ninth in the league with three complete games.

In 2000, Lieber was the Cubs' Opening Day starter. From June 28 to August 14, he won a career-high six consecutive decisions. On July 3, he threw a shutout, allowing two hits in a 3–0 victory over the Pirates. In his next start, on July 8, he had 12 strikeouts and threw a complete game in a 9–2 win over the White Sox. Lieber was 12–7 with a 4.12 ERA through his first 29 starts; however, he went 0–4 in September with a 5.88 ERA. In 35 starts (tied for the NL lead with Randy Johnson, Kevin Millwood, Tom Glavine, and Greg Maddux), Lieber had a 12–11 record, a 4.41 ERA, and 54 walks. He tied Darryl Kile for ninth in the league with 192 strikeouts, he led the league with 251 innings pitched, he ranked third in the league with 248 hits allowed (behind Liván Hernández's 254 and José Lima's 251), and he tied Maddux for third with six complete games (behind Johnson's and Curt Schilling's eight).

Lieber's most productive season came in 2001. On May 24, he one-hit the Cincinnati Reds, 3–0, ending the team's NL-record streak of 208 games in a row without being shut out, throwing just 78 pitches. From June 16 to July 15, he won six straight games. He was named an All-Star for the first and only time in his career. In his final start of the season on October 3, he allowed five runs in six innings but still earned his 20th win of the season as the Cubs beat the Reds 13–7. In 34 starts, Lieber recorded a career-high 20 victories to go with just six losses, posted a 3.80 ERA, and struck out 148 as opposed to 41 walks. His 20 wins ranked fourth in the league (behind Matt Morris's and Schilling's 22 and Johnson's 21), his 232 1/3 innings pitched ranked fifth in the league, and his five complete games tied for second in the league with Javier Vázquez (behind Johnson's six). He finished fourth in the NL Cy Young Award vote, behind Johnson, Schilling, and Morris. Due to the terrorist attacks of Sept. 11, 2001 and the week-long break in the baseball season, Lieber became the first Cubs pitcher to start consecutive contests since Scott Sanderson on May 18 and May 20 of 1986.

Lieber's 2002 season was curtailed by right elbow problems, which plagued him all year. On August 1, facing the San Diego Padres, Lieber allowed two runs in seven innings but received a no-decision in an 8–7 Cubs' victory. He was placed on the DL with right elbow tendinitis the next day, and he underwent Tommy John surgery on August 8, ending his season. In 21 starts, Lieber compiled a 6–8 record, a 3.70 ERA, 87 strikeouts, 12 walks, and 153 hits allowed in 141 innings pitched. He still managed to tie Randy Wolf, Brett Tomko, Pedro Astacio, and teammate Matt Clement for tenth in the league with three complete games. After the season, he became a free agent.

While on the Cubs, Lieber became the only Major League pitcher to give up a hit to a one handed player when he gave up not just one hit, but two to Jim Abbott, also allowing Abbott to drive in three RBIs.

=== Other teams (2004–08) ===
Lieber signed a two-year contract with the New York Yankees following the 2002 season. He missed the 2003 season recovering from his injury, although he did make two minor league rehab appearances. Lieber began the 2004 season on the DL with a strained abductor muscle in his right thigh. He returned to the major leagues on May 1, allowing three runs in seven innings in a 12–4 victories over the Kansas City Royals. Through August 1, he had a 7–7 records with a 5.06 ERA. From then on, Lieber went 7–1 with a 3.21 ERA. On September 18, he took a no-hitter into the seventh inning against the Boston Red Sox and allowed three runs in 8 1/3 innings in a 14–4 victory. In 27 starts, Lieber posted a 14–8 records, a 4.33 ERA, 102 strikeouts, 18 walks, and 216 hits allowed in 176 2/3 innings pitched. His 14 wins tied with eight other pitchers for eighth in the American League (AL) and tied with Javier Vázquez for the most by a Yankee as well as being the largest win total by an ex-20 game winner returning from a full-season layoff since 1946.

Dave Caldwell of the New York Times wrote on September 3 that Lieber would "probably end up in the bullpen" in the playoffs, but less than a month later, Mark Feinsand of MLB.com wrote that Lieber "has suddenly become one of the most important cogs in the Yankees' postseason machine" due an injury to Kevin Brown and late-season struggles by Vázquez. Lieber started Game 2 of the AL Division Series against the Minnesota Twins. He allowed three runs over 6 2/3 innings and was in line for the win, but he received a no-decision in a 12-inning, 7–6 Yankee victory. The Yankees won the series in four games. In Game 2 of the AL Championship Series against the Red Sox, Lieber allowed one run and three hits in seven innings, earning the win in a 3–1 victory. In Game 6, he allowed four runs in 7 1/3 innings and took the loss in a 4–2 defeat. The Red Sox become the first MLB team in history to overcome a 3–0 series deficit, winning in seven games. 2004 would be Lieber's only playoff experience, as well as his only stint in the AL.

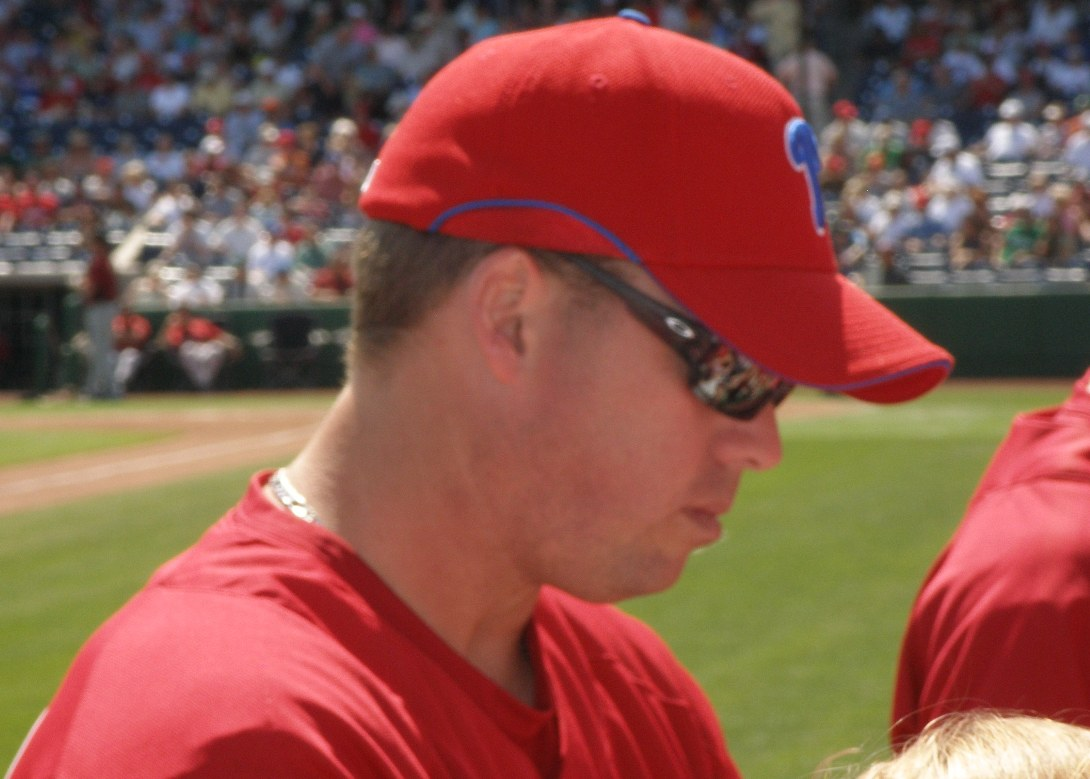
Lieber with the Phillies

Before the 2005 season, Lieber signed as a free agent with the Philadelphia Phillies for three years and $24 million with a team option for the fourth year. He was named the Phillies' Opening Day starter in 2005. He won his first four starts with the team. From May 12 through June 30, Lieber had a 3–7 records and a 7.48 ERA. 8–8 by the end of that stretch, he managed to post a 9–5 records and a 3.32 ERA to finish the season. Lieber gave up one run in eight innings on July 21 but took the loss as the Los Angeles Dodgers defeated the Phillies 1–0. On September 22, he threw eight shutout innings in a 4–0 victory over the Braves. Lieber finished the season with a 17–13 record, a 4.20 ERA, 149 strikeouts, 41 walks, and 223 hits allowed in 218 1/3 innings pitched. Lieber led the team with 17 wins, which tied with Andy Pettitte for fifth in the league. He tied with six other pitchers for the league lead with 35 starts.

Lieber lost his first four starts of the season in 2006 for the first time in his career. On May 13, he took a perfect game into the seventh inning against Cincinnati before allowing a two-out single to Adam Dunn; he threw 8 2/3 scoreless innings in a 2–0 victory. He was on the DL from May 30 to July 6 with a groin injury. Before going on the DL, he had a 3–5 records and a 5.79 ERA. He posted a 6.75 ERA in his first five starts after returning from the DL, but he posted a 3.38 in his final 11 starts. On August 16, he threw his first shutout since 2001 against the New York Mets, allowing five hits in a 3–0 victory. In 27 starts, Lieber compiled a 9–11 records, a 4.93 ERA, 100 strikeouts, 24 walks, and 196 hits allowed in 168 innings pitched.

Lieber began 2007 on the DL with a strained right oblique, and when he was activated on April 9, he was placed in the bullpen. After two relief outings, he returned to the rotation on April 20 when Brett Myers was moved to the bullpen. On June 9, he struck out 11 and allowed three hits in a 4–0 shutout of the Royals. At the time, he was 3–4 with a 3.72 ERA, but he allowed 14 runs (13 earned) over his next two starts, both losses. On June 23, Lieber was placed on the DL with a ruptured tendon in his right foot, which ended his tenure with the Phillies. In 14 games (12 starts), he had a 3–6 record, a 4.73 ERA, 54 strikeouts, 22 walks, and 91 hits allowed in 78 innings. The Phillies reached the playoffs, but Lieber was left off their postseason roster because of his injury.

On January 16, 2008, Lieber signed a one-year contract with the Chicago Cubs. He competed for the starting rotation but failed to earn a spot and was placed in the bullpen as the Cubs' long reliever. From July 18 to September 1, he was on the DL with a right foot injury. He appeared in his final major league game on September 5, giving up four runs in two innings in a 10–2 loss to Cincinnati. In 26 games (one start), Lieber posted a 2–3 record, a 4.05 ERA, 27 strikeouts, six walks, and 59 hits allowed in 46 2/3 innings pitched. The Cubs reached the playoffs, but Lieber was left off the playoff roster for the second year in a row.

Lieber retired after the 2008 season to spend more time with his family. In his 14-year career, Lieber had a 131–124 records, a 4.27 ERA, pitched over 225 home runs, 1,553 strikeouts, 422 walks, 2,388 hits allowed, and 2,198 innings pitched in 401 games (327 starts). His strikeout-to-walk ratio of 3.680 ranks 23rd all-time among major league pitchers as of 2020.

== Pitching style ==
Lieber threw three pitches: a fastball, a slider, and a changeup. The slider was the pitch Lieber often used to get outs and was most successful against right-handed batters. The changeup darted away from batters. Lieber was not a hard thrower (his fastball was in the low 90 mph range); he relied on controlling his pitches to have success.

== Personal life ==
Lieber married Jessica Conway on October 18, 1992. The couple have four children together: Jillian, Jared, Justin, and Jonah.

Sporting positions
Preceded by Zane Smith; Wagner	Pittsburgh Pirates Opening Day starting pitcher 1995; 1997	Succeeded by Paul Wagner; Francisco Córdova
Preceded by Steve Trachsel	Chicago Cubs Opening Day starting pitcher 2000 – 2002	Succeeded by Kerry Wood
Preceded by Kevin Millwood	Philadelphia Phillies Opening Day starting pitcher 2005-2006	Succeeded by Brett Myers
