= Ed Freed =

American baseball player (1919–2002)

- Outfielder
- Born: August 22, 1919; Center Valley, Pennsylvania, U.S.
- Died: November 15, 2002 (aged 83); Rock Hill, South Carolina, U.S.
- Batted: Right Threw: Right

MLB debut
- September 11, 1942, for the Philadelphia Phillies

Last MLB appearance
- September 27, 1942, for the Philadelphia Phillies

MLB statistics
- Batting average: .303
- Extra-base hits: 4
- Runs batted in: 1
- Stats at Baseball Reference

Teams
- Philadelphia Phillies (1942)

Edwin Charles Freed (August 22, 1919 – November 15, 2002) was an American professional baseball player. Within an eleven-year span, Freed played eight seasons in the minor leagues, with a "cup of coffee" in Major League Baseball with the Philadelphia Phillies during the 1942 season. He was officially listed as standing 5 feet 6 inches (168 cm) and weighing 165 pounds (75 kg).

== Early life ==
Freed was born on August 22, 1919, in Center Valley, Pennsylvania.

== Baseball career ==
=== Minor leagues: 1940–1942 ===
Freed began his baseball career during the 1940 season in Trenton, New Jersey, playing for the class-B Trenton Senators at age 20. Under manager Goose Goslin, he batted .280 with 20 doubles, the second-highest total on the team. In the field, he played 110 games, making 212 putouts and 12 errors. The next year, Freed led Trenton with 124 games played and 136 hits. He was second on the team with 10 triples and third with 23 doubles. As a fielder, he reduced his number of errors to 5 and made 209 putouts. He moved to the Philadelphia Phillies-affiliated Trenton Packers in 1942, finishing second to Ed Murphy in at-bats (484), hits (120), doubles (15), triples (6), and home runs (3). He batted .248 and slugged .322 while playing in 131 games. He led all Packers outfielders in games played, putouts, and assists. After the conclusion of Trenton's season, Freed was called up to the Phillies.

=== Major league career and military service ===
Freed made his debut with the Philadelphia Phillies on September 11, 1942, playing the full 11 innings in a game against the Cincinnati Reds. In six plate appearances, he notched four hits in five official at-bats, including two doubles and a triple. Although Freed, batting second, was on base five times (with one walk in addition to his four hits), his two runs scored were part of a losing effort, as Cincinnati won the game, 8–5. He added to his hit total in his second game the following day, collecting two more hits in five at-bats against the Reds. After getting another hit against the St. Louis Cardinals in the second game of September 13's doubleheader, the Redbirds held Freed hitless in a pinch-hitting appearance the next day. He played both games of a September 16 doubleheader, going a combined 1-for-8 between the two contests.

Freed's next three games were shutout losses for the Phillies, one each to the Chicago Cubs, Brooklyn Dodgers, and New York Giants. His last major league hit came in the second game of a doubleheader against the Giants, an RBI single in a 9–1 Philadelphia victory. His final two games, both against Brooklyn, were hitless, leaving Freed with a final batting average of .303 for his brief major league career. After the season, Freed was called into military service working in a defense plant, and did not return to baseball until after the 1945 season.

=== Return to baseball ===
Freed returned to baseball in 1946, playing for manager Eddie Sawyer for the Utica Blue Sox. He batted .277 for Utica with seven doubles, one triple, and four home runs. He left affiliated baseball in 1947 to play three seasons for the class-B Rock Hill Chiefs. In his first year, he ranked third on the team in games played and at-bats, hitting 31 doubles, 5 triples, and 4 home runs. He batted .324, the team's best mark among fielders with more than 20 games played. The next year, he batted .303 for the Chiefs. In a team-high 558 at-bats, he reached double digits in all extra-base hit categories for the first time in his career, stroking 27 doubles, 13 triples, and 10 home runs, and reaching a slugging percentage of .452. His 148 hits in 1949 were again a team-best total—amassing him a .292 average—and 42 went for extra bases. He moved to the Charlotte Hornets, a Washington Senators affiliate, for the 1950 season, where he notched 25 extra-base hits in 440 at-bats in his final professional season. For his minor league career, Freed finished with a .288 batting average and 1,038 hits, including 172 doubles, 49 triples and 37 home runs.

== After baseball ==
Freed died November 15, 2002, at age 83, and was interred in Grand View Memorial Park in Rock Hill, South Carolina.

== See also ==
- Philadelphia Phillies all-time roster (F)
