= Brett Myers =

American baseball player (born 1980)

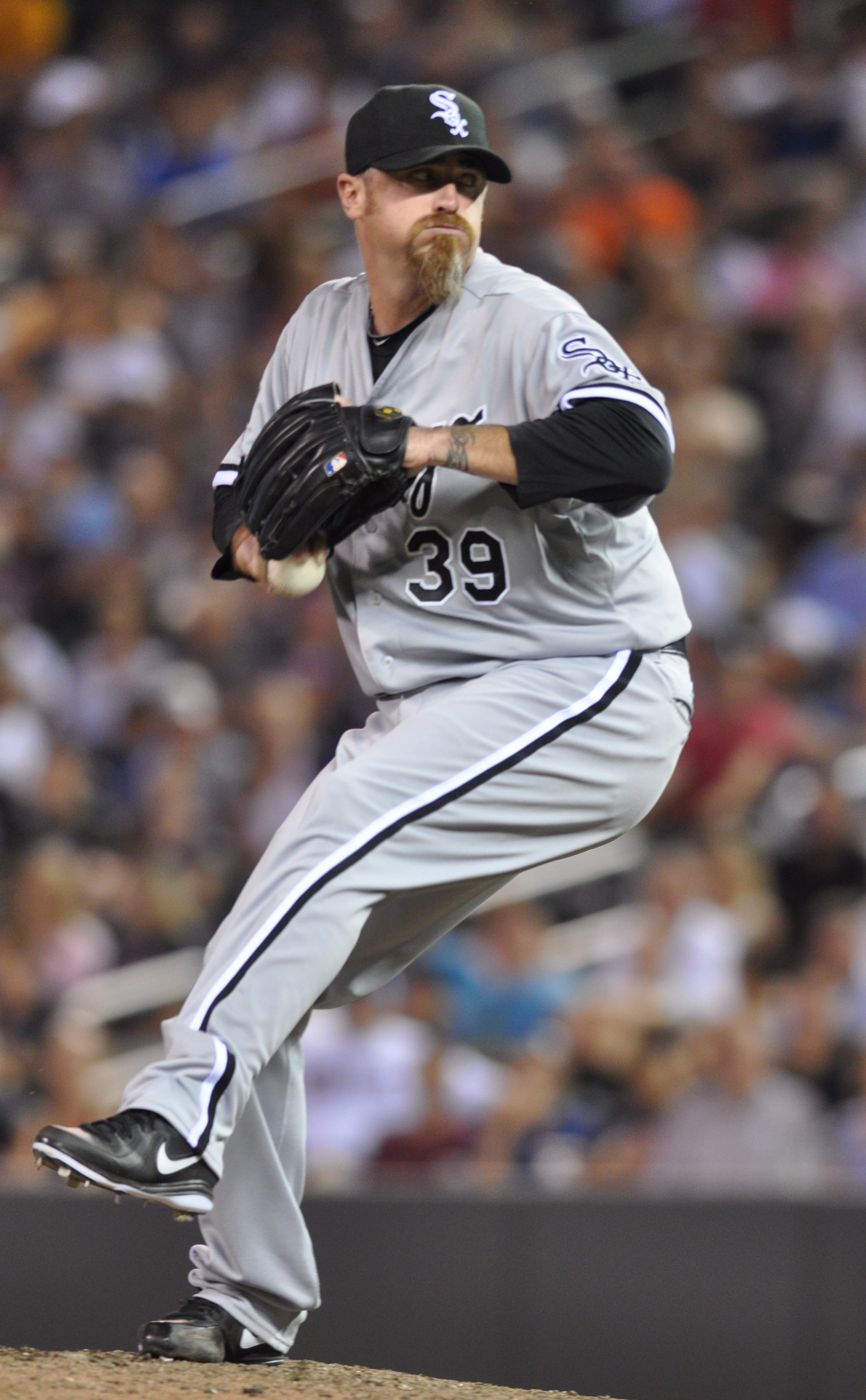
- Myers with the Chicago White Sox in 2012
- Pitcher
- Born: August 17, 1980 (age 46); Jacksonville, Florida, U.S.
- Batted: Right Threw: Right

MLB debut
- July 24, 2002, for the Philadelphia Phillies

Last MLB appearance
- April 19, 2013, for the Cleveland Indians

MLB statistics
- Win–loss record: 97–96
- Earned run average: 4.25
- Strikeouts: 1,379
- Stats at Baseball Reference

Teams
- Philadelphia Phillies (2002–2009); Houston Astros (2010–2012); Chicago White Sox (2012); Cleveland Indians (2013)

Career highlights and awards
- World Series champion (2008)

Brett Allen Myers (born August 17, 1980) is an American singer and former professional baseball pitcher. He played in Major League Baseball (MLB) for the Philadelphia Phillies, Houston Astros, Chicago White Sox, and Cleveland Indians. Born and raised in Jacksonville, Florida, Myers began his baseball career in high school. From there, he progressed to the professional ranks and made his MLB debut in 2002 for the Phillies, pitching for the team until 2009, mostly as a starter, but also closing for a time. He was a World Series champion in 2008 with the Phillies over the Tampa Bay Rays.

== Early life ==
Myers was born and raised in Jacksonville, Florida. As a senior at Englewood High School, he posted an 8–2 record and an 0.80 ERA in 78.0 innings pitched. Myers was a high school baseball teammate of former Jacksonville Jaguars defensive back, Rashean Mathis. Myers was also an amateur boxer when he was a teenager.

== Major league career ==
=== Philadelphia Phillies ===
==== 2002–2003: Early career ====
Myers made his major league debut in the summer of 2002, starting on July 24 against the Chicago Cubs at Wrigley Field. He finished his rookie season 4–5 with an earned run average of 4.25, pitching 72 innings. Myers also pitched the 2003 season with the Phillies, posting 14 wins in 32 starts. He threw his first career shutout in June 2003 against the Boston Red Sox.

==== 2004 ====
Expectations for Myers were high entering the 2004 season; however, these were tempered somewhat by his 11–11 record. He pitched his second career shutout in May and recorded a five-game losing streak from June 22 to July 23, receiving minimal run support from the Phillies offense. 2004 was Myers' strongest year on offense, posting a .196 batting average and tying for the team lead in sacrifice hits with Randy Wolf.

==== 2005 ====
The 2005 season was a strong one for Myers, as he posted 13 wins and a career-low ERA of 3.72. He struck out 208 batters in 215 1/3 innings and threw two complete games over the course of the season.

==== 2006 ====
Building on his performance from 2005, Myers was the Phillies' staff ace in 2006, leading the team in wins, ERA, starts, innings pitched, strikeouts and winning percentage. He became the first visiting pitcher to win a 1–0 game at Coors Field in Colorado, beginning a streak of ten consecutive games where he pitched at least six innings.

==== 2007: Finding a new role ====
On February 1, 2007, the Phillies announced they had agreed to a three-year, $25.75 million contract extension with Myers. He was also slated to start Opening Day for the Phillies. However, because of general ineffectiveness and injuries to other pitchers, Myers was moved to the bullpen on April 18, after only three starts. When closer Tom Gordon was sent to the disabled list because of rotator cuff inflammation on May 2, Myers took over in the closer role for the team. Following Gordon's return from the disabled list, Myers remained in the closer role due to his effectiveness in the position.

On May 25, 2007, Myers went on the disabled list for the first time in his career with a strained right shoulder. However, he returned in July to finish the year with 21 saves, remaining as the Philadelphia closer for the rest of the season. As the Opening Day starter and then the closer, Myers threw the first and last pitches of the 2007 season, and was on the mound as the Phillies clinched their first playoff spot in 14 years. He proved to be a successful reliever, going 5–5 with a 2.87 ERA in 48 relief appearances.

==== Media confrontation ====
On August 25, 2007, Myers was involved in an altercation with The Philadelphia Inquirer beat writer Sam Carchidi after Myers gave up two home runs against the San Diego Padres. Comments made by both the player and the reporter sent Myers into a profanity-laced verbal tirade with Carchidi in which Myers called him a "retard" and threatened to knock him out, while other members of the Phillies and Philadelphia media tried to separate the two.

==== 2007–08 offseason ====
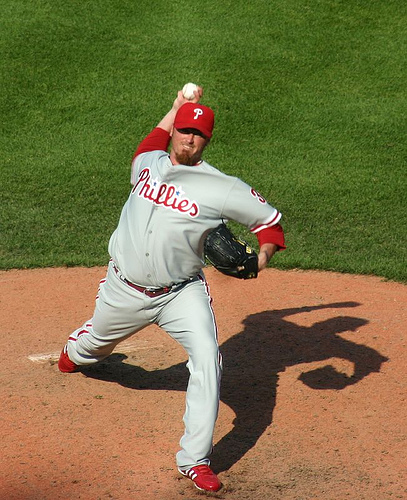
Myers pitching for the Phillies

In the off-season, the Phillies had announced that Myers would return to the rotation in 2008, since they had traded for all-star closer Brad Lidge. Though Myers expressed a desire to remain in the bullpen, he was willing to fulfill whatever role the team required.

"I liked having the chance to pitch every day or every other day as opposed to every fifth day", said Myers. "I'll do whatever the team needs. I've started my whole career so I'm ready to get back to it."

During spring training 2008, Myers spearheaded an elaborate prank on Kyle Kendrick involving a fake trade to Japan. The prank was notably successful, with manager Charlie Manuel, then-assistant general manager Rubén Amaro, Jr., the Phillies clubhouse, Kendrick's agent, and the press corps all in on the joke. Kendrick was completely fooled until Myers jumped in from behind, shouting "You know what I say? You just got punk'd!"

==== 2008: Struggles arise ====
Myers was the Opening Day starter for the Phillies in 2008. Myers opened the 2008 season weakly; though he pitched deep into games, he did not receive enough run support to cover the number of runs he surrendered. Through the first two months of the season, Myers posted only three wins, as opposed to six losses. His statistics went into a downward spiral as the season progressed, posting a 3–2 record in March and April, a 1–4 record in May, and not winning a single game in June; he went nearly a month without notching a single victory. On July 1, Myers agreed to be optioned down to the minors to address his mechanical issues and focus on pitching. It was reported that he would make at least three starts for the Phillies' Triple-A affiliate, the Lehigh Valley IronPigs, in Allentown, Pennsylvania. He did make one start for the Phillies AA affiliate, the Reading Phillies, and one start for the class-A Clearwater Threshers, to maintain his five-day pitching schedule. He returned to the Phillies and started against the New York Mets on July 23, but did not factor in a decision until his second game back against the Washington Nationals on July 29, where he won his fourth game of the year. Myers pitched strongly through the second half of the season, posting a 7–2 record and a 1.80 ERA heading into the final month of the season. On September 19, he gave up five runs to the first five batters of the game. On October 2, Myers won his first playoff start by pitching seven innings against the Milwaukee Brewers, giving up two earned runs. His key contribution in that game, however, was when he drew a two-out walk against CC Sabathia in the second inning that set the stage for Shane Victorino's clutch grand slam. Myers' next playoff start highlighted his batting skills, as he posted three RBIs and won the game. In the 2008 World Series, he lost his only start in Game 2.

==== 2009: Injuries ====
Myers complained of pain in his right hip during a May 27 game against the Florida Marlins. Tests revealed a torn labrum in the hip, which required surgery. Myers underwent the procedure in June and was placed on the disabled list.

On August 15, 2009, Myers was forced to miss his rehab start after an eye injury. The Phillies originally said Myers injured his eye while playing catch with his four-year-old son, but Myers changed the story and stated that he slipped out of his truck and hit his face.

He returned to the Phillies on September 4 and pitched out of the bullpen the following day. It was speculated in the media that Myers would be used in the closer's role again because of Brad Lidge's struggles. However, the possibility was shot down by Phillies manager Charlie Manuel who said Myers "has soreness, which is kind of normal because he missed so much time." After the 2009 World Series, Myers filed for free agency after the Phillies informed him that they would not be pursuing a new contract with him.

=== Houston Astros ===
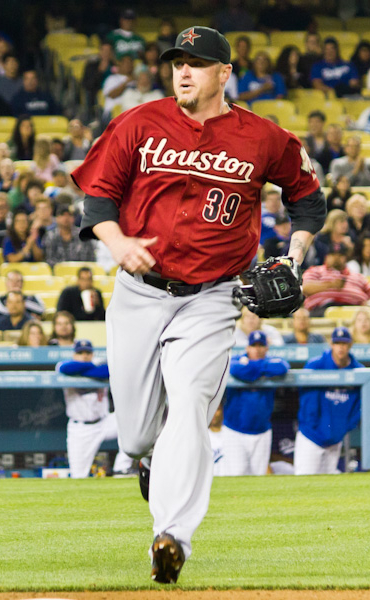
Myers with the Astros in 2011

On January 8, 2010, Myers agreed to a one-year deal with the Houston Astros. On August 1, 2010, Myers agreed to a two-year extension. The contract included a club option for the 2013 season. Myers finished 10th in the 2010 NL Cy Young Voting. With the Astros in 2011, Myers led the league in quality starts.

On February 28, 2012, Myers was moved once again to the closer role, after previous closer Mark Melancon was traded to the Boston Red Sox. Myers' vesting option for 2013 was changed from starts because of his new role.

=== Chicago White Sox ===
On July 21, 2012, Myers was traded to the Chicago White Sox for pitching prospects Matthew Heidenreich and Blair Walters, as well as a player to be named later, which eventually became Chris Devenski.

=== Cleveland Indians ===
On January 1, 2013, Myers agreed to a one-year contract, with an option for a second year, with the Cleveland Indians, pending a physical examination. The deal was made official January 4, 2013. Myers spent most of the 2013 season on the disabled list and was released on August 29.

== Personal life ==
Myers resides in Jacksonville, Florida with his wife and four children.

=== Domestic violence ===
On June 23, 2006, Myers was arrested and charged with assault after witnesses saw him punching his wife Kim on a downtown Boston street after an argument. The Phillies received criticism from some media members and women's organizations for not benching Myers. Myers took a short leave of absence from the team. During a pre-trial hearing on October 5, 2006, Kim Myers indicated that she did not want her husband prosecuted, and despite the prosecutor's insistence of filing charges, the case was dismissed.

=== Music ===
Since retiring from baseball, Myers has been pursuing a career as a musician using his friend, "Piggy" as inspiration. His debut EP Backwoods Rebel was released in May 2015. His latest album is Wrong Side of the Tracks (2021).

Sporting positions
Preceded by Jon Lieber	Philadelphia Phillies; Opening Day starting pitcher 2007–2009	Succeeded by Roy Halladay
