= Jumbo Elliott (baseball) =

American baseball player (1900–1970)

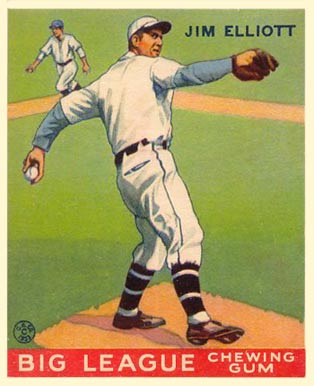
- Pitcher
- Born: October 22, 1900; St. Louis, Missouri, U.S.
- Died: January 7, 1970 (aged 69); Terre Haute, Indiana, U.S.
- Batted: Right Threw: Left

MLB debut
- April 21, 1923, for the St. Louis Browns

Last MLB appearance
- June 9, 1934, for the Boston Braves

MLB statistics
- Win–loss record: 63–74
- Earned run average: 4.24
- Strikeouts: 453
- Stats at Baseball Reference

Teams
- St. Louis Browns (1923); Brooklyn Robins (1925, 1927–1930); Philadelphia Phillies (1931–1934); Boston Braves (1934)

Career highlights and awards
- NL wins leader (1931)

James Thomas "Jumbo" Elliott (October 22, 1900 – January 7, 1970) was an American professional baseball player. He was a left-handed pitcher, playing in the major leagues over parts of ten seasons (1923, 1925, 1927–1934) with the St. Louis Browns, Brooklyn Robins, Philadelphia Phillies and Boston Braves. He was the National League wins leader in 1931 with Philadelphia. For his major league career, he compiled a 63–74 record in 252 appearances, with a 4.24 ERA and 453 strikeouts.

Elliott was born in St. Louis, Missouri. When he retired from baseball, he resided in Terre Haute, Indiana, the county seat of Vigo County. He first came to Terre Haute in 1922 as a pitcher for the Three-I League professional Class B minor league baseball team. Elliott was a long-time Deputy Sheriff in Vigo County and ran for Vigo County Sheriff as a Democrat in the 1968 election. His opponent was 6 ft 9 in (2.06 m) Clyde Lovellette, then retired from an extraordinary college and professional basketball career. The campaign earned national notoriety because both candidates were such big men (Elliott was approximately 6 ft 3 in (1.91 m) and 235 lb (107 kg)) and sports celebrities. Lovellette won the election.

Elliott died in Terre Haute at age 69.

== See also ==
- List of Major League Baseball annual wins leaders
