= Hal Elliott =

American baseball player (1899-1963)

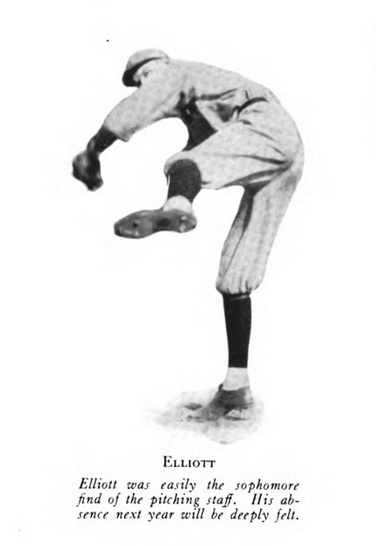
- Pitcher
- Born: May 29, 1899; Mount Clemens, Michigan, U.S.
- Died: April 25, 1963 (aged 63); Honolulu, Hawaii, U.S.
- Batted: Right Threw: Right

MLB debut
- April 19, 1929, for the Philadelphia Phillies

Last MLB appearance
- August 9, 1932, for the Philadelphia Phillies

MLB statistics
- Win–loss record: 11–24
- Earned run average: 6.95
- Strikeouts: 90
- Stats at Baseball Reference

Teams
- Philadelphia Phillies (1929–1932)

Harold William "Ace" Elliott (May 29, 1899 – April 25, 1963) was an American professional baseball pitcher. He played Major League Baseball for the Philadelphia Phillies from 1929 to 1932. He led the National League by appearing in 48 games as a pitcher in 1930. Over his four-year major league career, he compiled an 11–24 record with a 6.95 earned run average (ERA). Elliot has the dubious distinction of having the highest career ERA among all major league pitchers with at least 300 innings pitched since baseball's modern era began in 1901.

== Early life ==
Elliott was born in Mt. Clemens, Michigan in 1899. His father, John W. Elliott, was born in Canada, and his mother, Anna Elliott, was born in Germany. At the time of the 1900 United States census, Elliott and his parents were living in Mt. Clemens, and his father was employed as a day laborer. At the time of the 1910 United States census, Elliott was living in Mt. Clemens with his father's parents and two younger siblings. His father was employed at the time as an engineer at a hotel.

Elliott served in the United States Army Air Service during World War I as a private in the 66th Balloon Company. After the war, he attended the University of Michigan and played college baseball for the Michigan Wolverines baseball team from 1921 to 1922. The 1923 Michiganensian noted: "Elliott was easily the sophomore find of the pitching staff. His absence next year will be deeply felt."

== Professional baseball ==
=== Minor leagues ===
After leaving Michigan, he played professional baseball for 15 years, from 1923 to 1937. He began his career with the Kalamazoo Celery Pickers in the Michigan-Ontario League in 1923 and 1924. In 1925, he played for the London Indians in the same league. He next played for three years for the Waco Cubs in the Texas League from 1926 to 1928. He appeared in 113 games for Waco from 1927 to 1928 and compiled a record of 48–51. He had his best year in 1928 with a 16–13 record and 3.76 ERA.

=== Philadelphia Phillies ===
After a solid season with Waco in 1928, Elliott was drafted by the St. Louis Cardinals and then sold to the Philadelphia Phillies. On April 2, 1929, shortly after reporting to the Phillies' training camp in Florida, Eliott was injured when a car driven by Phillies' shortstop Tommy Thevenow crashed and both men were ejected from the vehicle. Elliott had ten stitches in his face and was discharged from the hospital; Thevenow remained hospitalized in critical condition.

Eliott made his major league debut with the Phillies on April 19, 1929. He played four years with the Phillies from 1929 to 1932. He led the National League in games played by a pitcher in 1930, appearing in 48 games, including 11 as a starter. The Phillies finished in last place in the National League in 1930 with a 52–102 record. His ERA jumped to 9.55 in 16 games for the Phillies in 1931. In his four seasons with the Phillies, Elliott had a record of 11–24, appeared in 120 games (30 as a starter), pitched 322-1/3 innings, and had a career ERA of 6.56.

=== Return to minor leagues ===
Elliott appeared in his last major league game in 1933. However, he continued to play minor league baseball through the 1937 season. His minor league assignments included the Buffalo Bisons (34 games in 1933), Syracuse Chiefs and Buffalo Bisons (30 games in 1934), Harrisburg Senators (35 games in 1935), Wilkes-Barre Barons (60 games from 1936 to 1937).

== Family and later years ==
Elliott was married to Gwedonlyn Tressa Brom in September 1922. He moved to Honolulu, Hawaii in the late 1950s. In April 1963, he died at his home in Honolulu at age 63.
