= 1942 Pittsburgh Pirates season =

1942 Pittsburgh Pirates
- League: National League
- Ballpark: Forbes Field
- City: Pittsburgh, Pennsylvania
- Owners: Bill Benswanger
- Managers: Frankie Frisch
- Radio: WWSW; Rosey Rowswell, Jack Craddock

The 1942 Pittsburgh Pirates season was the 61st season of the Pittsburgh Pirates franchise; the 56th in the National League. The Pirates finished fifth in the league standings with a record of 66–81.

== Offseason ==
- December 1, 1941: Hank Gornicki was selected off waivers by the Pirates from the St. Louis Cardinals.

== Regular season ==
=== Season standings ===
National League
Team	W	L	Pct.	GB	Home	Road
St. Louis Cardinals	106	48	.688	—	60‍–‍17	46‍–‍31
Brooklyn Dodgers	104	50	.675	2	57‍–‍22	47‍–‍28
New York Giants	85	67	.559	20	47‍–‍31	38‍–‍36
Cincinnati Reds	76	76	.500	29	38‍–‍39	38‍–‍37
Pittsburgh Pirates	66	81	.449	36½	41‍–‍34	25‍–‍47
Chicago Cubs	68	86	.442	38	36‍–‍41	32‍–‍45
Boston Braves	59	89	.399	44	33‍–‍36	26‍–‍53
Philadelphia Phils	42	109	.278	62½	23‍–‍51	19‍–‍58

=== Record vs. opponents ===
1942 National League record Sources:
Team	BSN	BRO	CHC	CIN	NYG	PHI	PIT	STL
Boston	—	6–16	13–9	5–16–1	8–12	14–8	7–12–1	6–16
Brooklyn	16–6	—	16–6	15–7	14–8–1	18–4	16–6	9–13
Chicago	9–13	6–16	—	13–9	9–13–1	14–8	11–11	6–16
Cincinnati	16–5–1	7–15	9–13	—	9–13	16–6	12–9–1	7–15
New York	12–8	8–14–1	13–9–1	13–9	—	17–5	15–7	7–15
Philadelphia	8–14	4–18	8–14	6–16	5–17	—	6–13	5–17
Pittsburgh	12–7–1	6–16	11–11	9–12–1	7–15	13–6	—	8–14–2
St. Louis	16–6	13–9	16–6	15–7	15–7	17–5	14–8–2	—

=== Game log ===
1942 Game Log: 66–81 (Home: 41–34; Away: 25–47)
April: 9–6 (Home: 6–5; Away: 3–1)

#	Date	Opponent	Score	Win	Loss	Save	Attendance	Record
1	April 14	@ Reds	4–2	**Butcher** (1–0)	Walters	—	34,104	1–0
2	April 15	@ Reds	6–2	**Dietz** (1–0)	Riddle	—	3,628	2–0
3	April 16	@ Reds	7–8 (12)	Beggs	**Wilkie** (0–1)	—	2,421	2–1
4	April 17	Cardinals	3–2	**Sewell** (1–0)	Warneke	—	18,324	3–1
5	April 18	Cardinals	3–0	**Heintzelman** (1–0)	White	—	5,945	4–1
6	April 19	Cardinals	2–3	Beazley	**Dietz** (1–1)	Gumbert	12,929	4–2
7	April 20	Cubs	2–8	Mooty	**Butcher** (1–1)	—	1,752	4–3
8	April 21	Cubs	5–2	**Sewell** (2–0)	Bithorn	—	2,397	5–3
9	April 22	Cubs	9–1	**Hamlin** (1–0)	Erickson	—	3,517	6–3
10	April 23	Reds	3–5	Vander Meer	**Lanning** (0–1)	—	4,533	6–4
11	April 24	Reds	5–9	Starr	**Dietz** (1–2)	Beggs	4,971	6–5
12	April 26	@ Cardinals	2–0	**Heintzelman** (2–0)	Warneke	—	—	7–5
13	April 26	@ Cardinals	4–4 (11)			—	14,820	7–5
14	April 28	Phillies	7–1	**Butcher** (2–1)	Naylor	—	1,752	8–5
15	April 29	Phillies	7–6 (10)	**Sewell** (3–0)	Blanton	—	1,567	9–5
16	April 30	Phillies	3–6	Hoerst	**Lanning** (0–2)	—	1,826	9–6

May: 10–21 (Home: 6–7; Away: 4–14)

#	Date	Opponent	Score	Win	Loss	Save	Attendance	Record
17	May 1	Dodgers	7–6	**Heintzelman** (3–0)	Allen	—	9,199	10–6
18	May 2	Dodgers	10–5	**Wilkie** (1–1)	Davis	—	17,210	11–6
19	May 3	Braves	6–2	**Butcher** (3–1)	Javery	—	—	12–6
20	May 3	Braves	3–12 (8)	Earley	**Sewell** (3–1)	—	29,030	12–7
21	May 4	Braves	2–1	**Klinger** (1–0)	Tobin	—	1,637	13–7
22	May 5	Braves	1–7	Wallace	**Dietz** (1–3)	—	2,321	13–8
23	May 7	Giants	2–1 (11)	**Wilkie** (2–1)	Carpenter	—	—	14–8
24	May 7	Giants	2–6	Koslo	**Heintzelman** (3–1)	—	4,075	14–9
25	May 8	@ Cubs	6–4	**Sewell** (4–1)	Schmitz	—	4,133	15–9
26	May 9	@ Cubs	1–3	Lee	**Butcher** (3–2)	—	3,465	15–10
27	May 10	@ Cubs	2–4	Passeau	**Hamlin** (1–1)	—	22,042	15–11
28	May 10	@ Cubs	3–2	**Klinger** (2–0)	Erickson	—	22,042	16–11
29	May 12	@ Giants	3–7	Melton	**Heintzelman** (3–2)	—	—	16–12
30	May 13	@ Giants	3–1	**Butcher** (4–2)	Koslo	—	—	17–12
31	May 14	@ Dodgers	4–7	French	**Wilkie** (2–2)	Casey	—	17–13
32	May 15	@ Dodgers	3–8	Wyatt	**Sewell** (4–2)	—	—	17–14
33	May 16	@ Dodgers	1–8	Head	**Heintzelman** (3–3)	—	—	17–15
34	May 17	@ Phillies	7–2	**Hamlin** (2–1)	Hoerst	—	—	18–15
35	May 17	@ Phillies	4–5 (11)	Melton	**Klinger** (2–1)	—	—	18–16
36	May 19	@ Phillies	4–5	Podgajny	**Butcher** (4–3)	Hoerst	3,366	18–17
37	May 20	@ Braves	3–4 (10)	Sain	**Heintzelman** (3–4)	—	3,010	18–18
38	May 23	Cubs	5–4	**Lanning** (1–2)	Erickson	**Sewell** (1)	3,090	19–18
39	May 24	Cubs	5–7 (10)	Lee	**Sewell** (4–3)	—	16,746	19–19
40	May 24	Cubs	4–11	Passeau	**Heintzelman** (3–5)	—	16,746	19–20
41	May 25	@ Reds	1–6	Derringer	**Butcher** (4–4)	—	16,205	19–21
42	May 27	Cardinals	3–5	Beazley	**Sewell** (4–4)	—	1,635	19–22
43	May 28	Cardinals	2–3 (11)	Beazley	**Wilkie** (2–3)	Gumbert	16,577	19–23
44	May 30	@ Cubs	5–10	Mooty	**Gornicki** (0–1)	Pressnell	—	19–24
45	May 30	@ Cubs	2–3	Fleming	**Hamlin** (2–2)	Pressnell	22,735	19–25
46	May 31	@ Reds	2–8	Walters	**Sewell** (4–5)	—	—	19–26
47	May 31	@ Reds	0–3	Starr	**Butcher** (4–5)	—	16,721	19–27

June: 13–9 (Home: 8–3; Away: 5–6)

#	Date	Opponent	Score	Win	Loss	Save	Attendance	Record
48	June 2	Dodgers	2–17	Webber	**Wilkie** (2–4)	—	3,257	19–28
49	June 5	Phillies	6–5	**Heintzelman** (4–5)	Hoerst	**Dietz** (1)	1,195	20–28
50	June 6	Phillies	3–1	**Sewell** (5–5)	Hughes	—	2,184	21–28
51	June 7	Phillies	5–4 (10)	**Heintzelman** (5–5)	Johnson	—	—	22–28
52	June 7	Phillies	8–6 (7)	**Lanning** (2–2)	Melton	**Wilkie** (1)	8,461	23–28
53	June 9	Braves	10–2	**Heintzelman** (6–5)	Tost	—	1,871	24–28
54	June 10	Braves	3–0	**Sewell** (6–5)	Tobin	—	11,533	25–28
55	June 13	Giants	8–2	**Klinger** (3–1)	Melton	—	4,096	26–28
56	June 14	Giants	3–4	Carpenter	**Heintzelman** (6–6)	—	16,719	26–29
57	June 14	Giants	8–3 (8)	**Sewell** (7–5)	Sunkel	—	16,719	27–29
58	June 15	Giants	2–6	Schumacher	**Butcher** (4–6)	—	—	27–30
59	June 16	@ Phillies	1–5	Podgajny	**Hamlin** (2–3)	—	1,196	27–31
60	June 17	@ Phillies	6–1	**Klinger** (4–1)	Hoerst	—	—	28–31
61	June 19	@ Braves	7–6 (11)	**Dietz** (2–3)	Sain	—	3,304	29–31
62	June 20	@ Braves	0–4	Javery	**Heintzelman** (6–7)	—	—	29–32
63	June 21	@ Braves	7–3 (10)	**Butcher** (5–6)	Errickson	—	5,000	30–32
64	June 23	@ Dodgers	2–6	French	**Klinger** (4–2)	—	16,080	30–33
65	June 26	@ Giants	2–4	Melton	**Sewell** (7–6)	—	7,585	30–34
66	June 27	@ Giants	2–5	Carpenter	**Heintzelman** (6–8)	—	4,100	30–35
67	June 28	@ Giants	8–7	**Wilkie** (3–4)	Adams	—	—	31–35
68	June 28	@ Giants	9–3	**Klinger** (5–2)	Schumacher	—	31,505	32–35
69	June 30	@ Cardinals	2–4	Cooper	**Sewell** (7–7)	—	13,252	32–36

July: 11–16 (Home: 8–7; Away: 3–9)

#	Date	Opponent	Score	Win	Loss	Save	Attendance	Record
70	July 1	@ Cardinals	0–4	White	**Heintzelman** (6–9)	—	1,439	32–37
71	July 2	@ Cardinals	1–3	Beazley	**Klinger** (5–3)	—	8,699	32–38
72	July 3	@ Cardinals	5–4	**Lanning** (3–2)	Warneke	**Dietz** (2)	1,169	33–38
73	July 4	Reds	0–2	Walters	**Butcher** (5–7)	—	18,000	33–39
74	July 5	Reds	4–3	**Sewell** (8–7)	Derringer	—	—	34–39
75	July 5	Reds	2–5	Starr	**Hamlin** (2–4)	—	11,365	34–40
76	July 9	Phillies	9–0	**Sewell** (9–7)	Melton	—	29,488	35–40
77	July 11	Phillies	12–5	**Wilkie** (4–4)	Pearson	—	2,034	36–40
78	July 12	Dodgers	1–2	French	**Lanning** (3–3)	—	—	36–41
79	July 12	Dodgers	6–4	**Heintzelman** (7–9)	Higbe	**Sewell** (2)	29,543	37–41
80	July 14	Dodgers	1–5	Wyatt	**Klinger** (5–4)	—	21,254	37–42
81	July 15	Giants	6–2	**Sewell** (10–7)	Carpenter	—	2,394	38–42
82	July 16	Giants	1–3	Hubbell	**Butcher** (5–8)	—	9,098	38–43
83	July 17	Giants	2–11	Schumacher	**Lanning** (3–4)	Adams	2,083	38–44
84	July 18	Braves	3–0	**Heintzelman** (8–9)	Javery	—	—	39–44
85	July 19	Braves	8–7	**Dietz** (3–3)	Errickson	—	—	40–44
86	July 19	Braves	9–0 (8)	**Klinger** (6–4)	Salvo	—	7,425	41–44
87	July 20	Dodgers	0–5	French	**Lanning** (3–5)	—	13,600	41–45
88	July 21	@ Giants	5–6	Hubbell	**Wilkie** (4–5)	—	8,937	41–46
89	July 23	@ Giants	4–6	McGee	**Sewell** (10–8)	—	5,555	41–47
90	July 24	@ Dodgers	4–6	Wyatt	**Heintzelman** (8–10)	—	10,798	41–48
91	July 25	@ Dodgers	4–1	**Gornicki** (1–1)	Davis	—	11,314	42–48
92	July 26	@ Dodgers	2–3	Allen	**Klinger** (6–5)	Head	—	42–49
93	July 26	@ Dodgers	3–5	Macon	**Lanning** (3–6)	Head	31,844	42–50
94	July 28	@ Braves	3–4	Tost	**Dietz** (3–4)	—	1,527	42–51
95	July 29	@ Braves	3–0	**Sewell** (11–8)	Javery	—	—	43–51
96	July 29	@ Braves	5–6	Tobin	**Klinger** (6–6)	—	4,064	43–52

August: 15–15 (Home: 8–7; Away: 7–8)

#	Date	Opponent	Score	Win	Loss	Save	Attendance	Record
97	August 1	@ Phillies	1–2 (12)	Hughes	**Sewell** (11–9)	—	—	43–53
98	August 2	@ Phillies	4–2	**Hamlin** (3–4)	Melton	—	—	44–53
99	August 2	@ Phillies	3–2	**Dietz** (4–4)	Hoerst	**Butcher** (1)	—	45–53
100	August 4	Cubs	2–1 (11)	**Klinger** (7–6)	Bithorn	—	2,042	46–53
101	August 5	Cubs	3–0	**Sewell** (12–9)	Fleming	—	8,826	47–53
102	August 7	Cardinals	13–6	**Wilkie** (5–5)	Lanier	—	10,430	48–53
103	August 8	Cardinals	5–5 (16)			—	2,128	48–53
104	August 9	Cardinals	3–4	Dickson	**Lanning** (3–7)	—	—	48–54
105	August 9	Cardinals	1–2 (8)	Krist	**Klinger** (7–7)	—	15,561	48–55
106	August 10	Cardinals	6–4	**Wilkie** (6–5)	Cooper	**Dietz** (3)	1,507	49–55
107	August 11	Reds	3–1	**Gornicki** (2–1)	Thompson	—	2,108	50–55
108	August 12	Reds	0–3	Vander Meer	**Sewell** (12–10)	—	8,114	50–56
109	August 14	@ Cubs	1–7	Warneke	**Klinger** (7–8)	—	3,934	50–57
110	August 15	@ Cubs	8–5	**Dietz** (5–4)	Bithorn	**Lanning** (1)	—	51–57
111	August 15	@ Cubs	8–7 (11)	**Sewell** (13–10)	Errickson	—	11,702	52–57
112	August 16	@ Cubs	1–5	Lee	**Gornicki** (2–2)	—	—	52–58
113	August 16	@ Cubs	1–4	Fleming	**Sewell** (13–11)	—	25,930	52–59
114	August 18	@ Reds	3–0	**Lanning** (4–7)	Walters	—	6,475	53–59
115	August 19	@ Reds	9–2	**Gornicki** (3–2)	Derringer	—	1,338	54–59
116	August 20	@ Reds	3–5	Vander Meer	**Sewell** (13–12)	—	1,324	54–60
117	August 21	@ Cardinals	2–10	Beazley	**Dietz** (5–5)	—	2,010	54–61
118	August 22	@ Cardinals	6–7	Lanier	**Klinger** (7–9)	—	3,067	54–62
119	August 23	@ Cardinals	5–3	**Klinger** (8–9)	Cooper	—	—	55–62
120	August 23	@ Cardinals	2–5	Dickson	**Lanning** (4–8)	—	—	55–63
121	August 25	Braves	6–0	**Sewell** (14–12)	Earley	—	—	56–63
122	August 27	Braves	5–0	**Gornicki** (4–2)	Tobin	—	4,106	57–63
123	August 29	Giants	0–2	Schumacher	**Dietz** (5–6)	—	—	57–64
124	August 29	Giants	4–7	McGee	**Klinger** (8–10)	—	5,212	57–65
125	August 30	Dodgers	1–3	Wyatt	**Heintzelman** (8–11)	Davis	—	57–66
126	August 30	Dodgers	9–5 (8)	**Sewell** (15–12)	French	—	26,377	58–66
127	August 31	Dodgers	4–5 (11)	Davis	**Gornicki** (4–3)	—	3,697	58–67

September: 8–14 (Home: 5–5; Away: 3–9)

#	Date	Opponent	Score	Win	Loss	Save	Attendance	Record
128	September 1	Dodgers	2–4	Higbe	**Klinger** (8–11)	—	4,437	58–68
129	September 2	Phillies	5–2	**Dietz** (6–6)	Hoerst	—	3,712	59–68
130	September 4	Cubs	3–5	Bithorn	**Sewell** (15–13)	—	5,218	59–69
131	September 6	Cubs	6–0	**Gornicki** (5–3)	Passeau	—	—	60–69
132	September 6	Cubs	5–0	**Hamlin** (4–4)	Fleming	—	8,610	61–69
133	September 7	Cardinals	11–6	**Sewell** (16–13)	Dickson	**Klinger** (1)	—	62–69
134	September 7	Cardinals	4–6 (8)	Beazley	**Dietz** (6–7)	—	18,785	62–70
135	September 8	@ Dodgers	0–4	Head	**Wilkie** (6–6)	—	—	62–71
136	September 10	@ Phillies	1–2 (11)	Hughes	**Dietz** (6–8)	—	—	62–72
137	September 12	@ Braves	1–4	Tobin	**Gornicki** (5–4)	—	—	62–73
138	September 12	@ Braves	2–2 (11)			—	—	62–73
139	September 13	@ Giants	0–5	Carpenter	**Sewell** (16–14)	—	—	62–74
140	September 13	@ Giants	3–5	McGee	**Wilkie** (6–7)	—	17,794	62–75
141	September 14	@ Giants	1–6	Schumacher	**Dietz** (6–9)	—	2,428	62–76
142	September 16	@ Dodgers	3–10	Wyatt	**Gornicki** (5–5)	—	11,994	62–77
143	September 17	@ Dodgers	3–2	**Sewell** (17–14)	Head	—	—	63–77
144	September 18	Reds	1–5	Vander Meer	**Hallett** (0–1)	—	5,154	63–78
145	September 19	Reds	3–4	Walters	**Brandt** (0–1)	—	1,485	63–79
146	September 20	Reds	2–1 (13)	**Lanning** (5–8)	Shoun	—	—	64–79
147	September 20	Reds	3–3 (7)			—	4,161	64–79
148	September 21	@ Cardinals	1–2	White	**Gornicki** (5–6)	—	5,000	64–80
149	September 22	@ Cardinals	3–9	Gumbert	**Sewell** (17–15)	Dickson	8,823	64–81
150	September 27	@ Reds	8–7 (12)	**Lanning** (6–8)	Beggs	**Gornicki** (1)	—	65–81
151	September 27	@ Reds	7–4	**Brandt** (1–1)	Vander Meer	**Gornicki** (2)	2,070	66–81

Legend: = Win = Loss = Tie
Bold = Pirates team member

=== Roster ===
1942 Pittsburgh Pirates
**Roster**
**Pitchers**: -- Bill Brandt; 19 Max Butcher; -- Dick Conger; 22 Dutch Dietz; 27 Hank Gornicki; -- Jack Hallett; 13 Luke Hamlin; 32 Ken Heintzelman; 24 Ken Jungels; 20 Bob Klinger; 29 Johnny Lanning; 30 Rip Sewell; -- Harry Shuman; 25 Nick Strincevich; 39 Lefty Wilkie	**Catchers**: 7 Bill Baker; 12 Al López; 10 Babe Phelps; **Infielders**: 15 Alf Anderson; 5 Pete Coscarart; 8 Bob Elliott; 3 Elbie Fletcher; 4 Huck Geary; 16 Frankie Gustine; 4 Stu Martin	**Outfielders**: 18 Johnny Barrett; -- Frank Colman; 9 Vince DiMaggio; 40 Culley Rikard; -- Jim Russell; 14 Bud Stewart; 17 Maurice Van Robays; 11 Jimmy Wasdell; 23 Johnny Wyrostek; **Other batters**: 3 Ed Leip	**Manager**: 35 Frankie Frisch; **Coaches**: 36 Spud Davis; 34 Jake Flowers; 33 Honus Wagner

== Player stats ==
=== Batting ===
==== Starters by position ====
Note: Pos = Position; G = Games played; AB = At bats; H = Hits; Avg. = Batting average; HR = Home runs; RBI = Runs batted in

Pos	Player	G	AB	H	Avg.	HR	RBI
C	Al López	103	289	74	.256	1	26
1B	Elbie Fletcher	145	506	146	.289	7	57
2B	Frankie Gustine	115	388	89	.229	2	35
SS	Pete Coscarart	133	487	111	.228	3	29
3B	Bob Elliott	143	560	166	.296	9	89
OF	Johnny Barrett	111	332	82	.247	0	26
OF	Vince DiMaggio	143	496	118	.238	15	75
OF	Jimmy Wasdell	122	409	106	.259	3	38

==== Other batters ====
Note: G = Games played; AB = At bats; H = Hits; Avg. = Batting average; HR = Home runs; RBI = Runs batted in

Player	G	AB	H	Avg.	HR	RBI
Maurice Van Robays	100	328	76	.232	1	46
Babe Phelps	95	257	73	.284	9	41
Bud Stewart	82	183	40	.219	0	20
Alf Anderson	54	166	45	.271	0	7
Stu Martin	42	120	27	.225	1	12
Culley Rikard	38	52	10	.192	0	5
Frank Colman	10	37	5	.135	1	2
Johnny Wyrostek	9	35	4	.114	0	3
Huck Geary	9	22	5	.227	0	2
Bill Baker	18	17	2	.118	0	2
Jim Russell	5	14	1	.071	0	0
Ed Leip	3	0	0	----	0	0

=== Pitching ===
==== Starting pitchers ====
Note: G = Games pitched; IP = Innings pitched; W = Wins; L = Losses; ERA = Earned run average; SO = Strikeouts

Player	G	IP	W	L	ERA	SO
Rip Sewell	40	248.0	17	15	3.41	69
Max Butcher	24	150.2	5	8	2.93	49
Ken Heintzelman	27	130.0	8	11	4.57	39
Jack Hallett	3	22.1	0	1	4.84	16
Bill Brandt	3	16.1	1	1	4.96	4

==== Other pitchers ====
Note: G = Games pitched; IP = Innings pitched; W = Wins; L = Losses; ERA = Earned run average; SO = Strikeouts

Player	G	IP	W	L	ERA	SO
Bob Klinger	37	152.2	8	11	3.24	58
Dutch Dietz	40	134.1	6	9	3.95	35
Johnny Lanning	34	119.1	6	8	3.32	31
Hank Gornicki	25	112.0	5	6	2.57	48
Luke Hamlin	23	112.0	4	4	3.94	38
Lefty Wilkie	35	107.1	6	7	4.19	18
Nick Strincevich	7	22.1	0	0	2.82	10
Dick Conger	2	8.1	0	0	2.16	3

==== Relief pitchers ====
Note: G = Games pitched; W = Wins; L = Losses; SV = Saves; ERA = Earned run average; SO = Strikeouts

Player	G	W	L	SV	ERA	SO
Ken Jungels	6	0	0	0	6.59	7
Harry Shuman	1	0	0	0	0.00	1

== Farm system ==
Level	Team	League	Manager
AA	Toronto Maple Leafs	International League	Burleigh Grimes
A	Albany Senators	Eastern League	Ripper Collins
B	Harrisburg Senators	Interstate League	Danny Taylor
C	Hutchinson Pirates	Western Association	Walter Holke
D	Moultrie Packers	Georgia–Florida League	F. M. McVay
D	Oil City Oilers	Pennsylvania State Association	Frank Oceak
D	Hornell Maples	PONY League	Poke Whalen and Leo Mackey

Toronto affiliation shared with Philadelphia Athletics
