= 1942 St. Louis Cardinals season =

Major League Baseball season

1942 St. Louis Cardinals
- World Series champions National League champions
- League: National League
- Ballpark: Sportsman's Park
- City: St. Louis, Missouri
- Record: 106–48 (.688)
- League place: 1st
- Owners: Sam Breadon
- General managers: Branch Rickey
- Managers: Billy Southworth
- Radio: KWK (Dizzy Dean, Johnny O'Hara); KXOK (France Laux)

The 1942 St. Louis Cardinals season was the team's 61st season in St. Louis, Missouri and its 51st season in the National League. The Cardinals won 106 games, the most in team history. They finished first in the National League, and met the New York Yankees in the World Series. They won the series in 5 games to capture their fourth National League title and fourth World Series title.

Pitcher Mort Cooper won the MVP Award this year, with a 1.78 ERA, 22 wins, and 152 strikeouts.

This was Branch Rickey's 26th and final year with the Cardinals, the last 17 of them as the team's de facto general manager. In October, he will become president and GM of the Brooklyn Dodgers.

== Offseason ==
- December 1, 1941: Hank Gornicki was selected off waivers from the Cardinals by the Pittsburgh Pirates.
- Prior to 1942 season (exact date unknown)
  - Del Rice was signed as an amateur free agent by the Cardinals.

== Regular season ==
=== Season standings ===
National League
Team	W	L	Pct.	GB	Home	Road
St. Louis Cardinals	106	48	.688	—	60‍–‍17	46‍–‍31
Brooklyn Dodgers	104	50	.675	2	57‍–‍22	47‍–‍28
New York Giants	85	67	.559	20	47‍–‍31	38‍–‍36
Cincinnati Reds	76	76	.500	29	38‍–‍39	38‍–‍37
Pittsburgh Pirates	66	81	.449	36½	41‍–‍34	25‍–‍47
Chicago Cubs	68	86	.442	38	36‍–‍41	32‍–‍45
Boston Braves	59	89	.399	44	33‍–‍36	26‍–‍53
Philadelphia Phils	42	109	.278	62½	23‍–‍51	19‍–‍58

=== Record vs. opponents ===
1942 National League record Sources:
Team	BSN	BRO	CHC	CIN	NYG	PHI	PIT	STL
Boston	—	6–16	13–9	5–16–1	8–12	14–8	7–12–1	6–16
Brooklyn	16–6	—	16–6	15–7	14–8–1	18–4	16–6	9–13
Chicago	9–13	6–16	—	13–9	9–13–1	14–8	11–11	6–16
Cincinnati	16–5–1	7–15	9–13	—	9–13	16–6	12–9–1	7–15
New York	12–8	8–14–1	13–9–1	13–9	—	17–5	15–7	7–15
Philadelphia	8–14	4–18	8–14	6–16	5–17	—	6–13	5–17
Pittsburgh	12–7–1	6–16	11–11	9–12–1	7–15	13–6	—	8–14–2
St. Louis	16–6	13–9	16–6	15–7	15–7	17–5	14–8–2	—

=== Roster ===
1942 St. Louis Cardinals
Roster
Pitchers: 21 Johnny Beazley; 27 Bill Beckmann; 13 Mort Cooper; 22 Murry Dickson; 19 Harry Gumbert; 29 Howie Krist; 23 Max Lanier; 34 Bill Lohrman; 35 Whitey Moore; 11,27 Howie Pollet; 24 Clyde Shoun; 18 Lon Warneke; 28 Ernie White	Catchers: 15 Walker Cooper; 14 Gus Mancuso; 32 Sam Narron; 16 Ken O'Dea; 38 Kenneth Saeger; Infielders: 2 Buddy Blattner; 3 Jimmy Brown; 7 Creepy Crespi; 2 Jeff Cross; 12 Johnny Hopp; 1 Whitey Kurowski; 4 Marty Marion; 5 Ray Sanders	Outfielders: 17 Erv Dusak; 8 Terry Moore; 6 Stan Musial; 9 Enos Slaughter; 20 Coaker Triplett; 10 Harry Walker; Other batters: 11 Estel Crabtree	Manager: 30 Billy Southworth; Coaches: 25 Mike González (Third base); 26 Buzzy Wares

== Player stats ==
= Indicates team leader

= Indicates league leader

=== Batting ===
==== Starters by position ====
Note: Pos = Position; G = Games played; AB = At bats; H = Hits; Avg. = Batting average; HR = Home runs; RBI = Runs batted in

Pos	Player	G	AB	H	Avg.	HR	RBI
C	Walker Cooper	125	438	123	.281	7	65
1B	Johnny Hopp	95	314	81	.258	3	37
2B	Jimmy Brown	145	606	155	.256	1	71
3B	Whitey Kurowski	115	366	93	.254	9	42
SS	Marty Marion	147	485	134	.276	0	54
OF	Stan Musial	140	467	147	.315	10	72
OF	Enos Slaughter	152	591	188	.318	13	98
OF	Terry Moore	130	489	141	.288	6	49

==== Other batters ====
Note: G = Games played; AB = At bats; H = Hits; Avg. = Batting average; HR = Home runs; RBI = Runs batted in

Player	G	AB	H	Avg.	HR	RBI
Creepy Crespi	93	292	71	.243	0	35
Ray Sanders	95	282	71	.252	5	39
Ken O'Dea	58	192	45	.234	5	32
Harry Walker	74	191	60	.314	0	16
Coaker Triplett	64	154	42	.273	1	23
Erv Dusak	12	27	5	.185	0	3
Buddy Blattner	19	23	1	.043	0	1
Gus Mancuso	5	13	1	.077	0	1
Sam Narron	10	10	4	.400	0	1
Estel Crabtree	10	9	3	.333	0	2
Jeff Cross	1	4	1	.250	0	1

=== Pitching ===
==== Starting pitchers ====
Note: G = Games pitched; IP = Innings pitched; W = Wins; L = Losses; ERA = Earned run average; SO = Strikeouts

Player	G	IP	W	L	ERA	SO
Mort Cooper	37	278.2	22	7	1.78	152
Johnny Beazley	43	215.1	21	6	2.13	91
Ernie White	26	128.1	7	5	2.52	67
Lon Warneke	12	82.0	6	4	3.29	31

==== Other pitchers ====
Note: G = Games pitched; IP = Innings pitched; W = Wins; L = Losses; ERA = Earned run average; SO = Strikeouts

Player	G	IP	W	L	ERA	SO
Harry Gumbert	38	163.0	9	5	3.26	52
Max Lanier	34	161.0	13	8	2.96	93
Howie Pollet	27	109.1	7	5	2.88	42

Note: Harry Gumbert was the team leader in saves with 5.

==== Relief pitchers ====
Note: G = Games pitched; W = Wins; L = Losses; SV = Saves; ERA = Earned run average; SO = Strikeouts

Player	G	W	L	SV	ERA	SO
Murry Dickson	36	6	3	2	2.91	66
Howie Krist	34	13	3	1	2.51	47
Whitey Moore	9	0	1	0	4.38	1
Bill Lohrman	5	1	1	0	1.42	6
Bill Beckmann	2	1	0	0	0.00	3
Clyde Shoun	2	0	0	0	0.00	0

== 1942 World Series ==
NL St. Louis Cardinals (4) vs. AL New York Yankees (1)

Game	Score	Date	Location	Attendance
1	Yankees – 7, Cardinals – 4	September 30	Sportsman's Park	34,769
2	Yankees – 3, Cardinals – 4	October 1	Sportsman's Park	34,255
3	Cardinals – 2, Yankees – 0	October 3	Yankee Stadium	69,123
4	Cardinals – 9, Yankees – 6	October 4	Yankee Stadium	69,902
5	Cardinals – 4, Yankees – 2	October 5	Yankee Stadium	69,052

== Farm system ==
Level	Team	League	Manager
AA	Columbus Red Birds	American Association	Eddie Dyer
AA	Rochester Red Wings	International League	Tony Kaufmann, Estel Crabtree and Ray Hayworth
AA	Sacramento Solons	Pacific Coast League	Pepper Martin
A1	New Orleans Pelicans	Southern Association	Pat Ankenman
A1	Houston Buffaloes	Texas League	Clay Hopper
B	Decatur Commodores	Illinois–Indiana–Iowa League	Adel White and Tony Kaufmann
B	Allentown Wings	Interstate League	Benny Borgmann
B	Asheville Tourists	Piedmont League	Bill DeLancey
B	Columbus Red Birds	Sally League	Harrison Wickel
B	Mobile Shippers	Southeastern League	Tommy West and Adel White
C	Fresno Cardinals	California League	Lou Scoffic
C	Springfield Cardinals	Middle Atlantic League	Walter Alston
C	Duluth Dukes	Northern League	Eddie Malone
C	Pocatello Cardinals	Pioneer League	Nick Cullop
C	Springfield Cardinals	Western Association	Runt Marr

Level	Team	League	Manager
D	Johnson City Cardinals	Appalachian League	Mercer Harris
D	Albany Cardinals	Georgia–Florida League	Joe Cusick
D	Union City Greyhounds	KITTY League	Everett Johnston
D	Williamson Red Birds	Mountain State League	Ollie Vanek
D	Washington Red Birds	Pennsylvania State Association	George Jenkins and Moose Fralick
D	Hamilton Red Wings	PONY League	Roy Pfleger, Ken Blackman and Joe Sugden
D	La Crosse Blackhawks	Wisconsin State League	Ed Konetchy and Lou Scoffic

LEAGUE CHAMPIONS: Columbus (American Assn.), Pocatello
California League folded, June 28, 1942; KITTY League folded, June 19
