= 1942 Chicago Cubs season =

1942 Chicago Cubs
- League: National League
- Ballpark: Wrigley Field
- City: Chicago
- Record: 68–86 (.442)
- League place: 6th
- Owners: Philip K. Wrigley
- General managers: James T. Gallagher
- Managers: Jimmie Wilson
- Radio: WGN (Bob Elson, Jack Brickhouse); WJJD (Pat Flanagan, Jack L. Fitzpatrick); WCFL (Hal Totten)

The 1942 Chicago Cubs season was the 71st season of the Chicago Cubs franchise, the 67th in the National League and the 27th at Wrigley Field. The Cubs finished sixth in the National League with a record of 68–86.

== Regular season ==
=== Season standings ===
National League
Team	W	L	Pct.	GB	Home	Road
St. Louis Cardinals	106	48	.688	—	60‍–‍17	46‍–‍31
Brooklyn Dodgers	104	50	.675	2	57‍–‍22	47‍–‍28
New York Giants	85	67	.559	20	47‍–‍31	38‍–‍36
Cincinnati Reds	76	76	.500	29	38‍–‍39	38‍–‍37
Pittsburgh Pirates	66	81	.449	36½	41‍–‍34	25‍–‍47
Chicago Cubs	68	86	.442	38	36‍–‍41	32‍–‍45
Boston Braves	59	89	.399	44	33‍–‍36	26‍–‍53
Philadelphia Phils	42	109	.278	62½	23‍–‍51	19‍–‍58

=== Record vs. opponents ===
1942 National League record Sources:
Team	BSN	BRO	CHC	CIN	NYG	PHI	PIT	STL
Boston	—	6–16	13–9	5–16–1	8–12	14–8	7–12–1	6–16
Brooklyn	16–6	—	16–6	15–7	14–8–1	18–4	16–6	9–13
Chicago	9–13	6–16	—	13–9	9–13–1	14–8	11–11	6–16
Cincinnati	16–5–1	7–15	9–13	—	9–13	16–6	12–9–1	7–15
New York	12–8	8–14–1	13–9–1	13–9	—	17–5	15–7	7–15
Philadelphia	8–14	4–18	8–14	6–16	5–17	—	6–13	5–17
Pittsburgh	12–7–1	6–16	11–11	9–12–1	7–15	13–6	—	8–14–2
St. Louis	16–6	13–9	16–6	15–7	15–7	17–5	14–8–2	—

=== Notable transactions ===
- June 1, 1942: Jimmie Foxx was selected off waivers by the Cubs from the Boston Red Sox.

=== Roster ===
1942 Chicago Cubs
Roster
Pitchers: 31 Joe Berry; 17 Hi Bithorn; 21 Bob Bowman; 14 Vallie Eaves; 32 Paul Erickson; 21 Dick Errickson; 30,46 Bill Fleming; 30 Jesse Flores; 45 Ed Hanyzewski; 22 Emil Kush; 11 Bill Lee; 25 Jake Mooty; 23 Vern Olsen; 13 Claude Passeau; 40 Tot Pressnell; 31 Johnny Schmitz; 19 Lon Warneke; 45 Hank Wyse	Catchers: 2,43 Marv Felderman; 2 Paul Gillespie; 9 Chico Hernández; 5 Clyde McCullough; 33 Bob Scheffing; Infielders: 32 Cy Block; 16 Babe Dahlgren; 16 Jimmie Foxx; 6 Stan Hack; 35 Lennie Merullo; 12 Rip Russell; 15 Lou Stringer; 28 Bobby Sturgeon	Outfielders: 44 Phil Cavarretta; 7 Dom Dallessandro; 4 Charlie Gilbert; 43 Peanuts Lowrey; 8 Bill Nicholson; 14,19 Lou Novikoff; 48 Whitey Platt; 46 Marv Rickert	Manager: 1 Jimmie Wilson; Coaches: 38 Kiki Cuyler; 37 Dick Spalding

== Player stats ==
=== Batting ===
==== Starters by position ====
Note: Pos = Position; G = Games played; AB = At bats; H = Hits; Avg. = Batting average; HR = Home runs; RBI = Runs batted in

Pos	Player	G	AB	H	Avg.	HR	RBI
C	Clyde McCullough	109	337	95	.282	5	31
1B	Jimmie Foxx	70	205	42	.205	3	19
2B	Lou Stringer	121	406	96	.236	9	41
3B	Stan Hack	140	553	166	.300	6	39
SS	Lennie Merullo	143	515	132	.256	2	37
OF	Bill Nicholson	152	588	173	.294	21	78
OF	Phil Cavarretta	136	482	130	.270	3	54
OF	Lou Novikoff	128	483	145	.300	7	64

==== Other batters ====
Note: G = Games played; AB = At bats; H = Hits; Avg. = Batting average; HR = Home runs; RBI = Runs batted in

Player	G	AB	H	Avg.	HR	RBI
Rip Russell	102	302	73	.242	8	41
Dom Dallessandro	96	264	69	.261	4	43
Charlie Gilbert	74	179	33	.184	0	7
Bobby Sturgeon	63	162	40	.247	0	7
Chico Hernández	47	118	27	.229	0	7
Bob Scheffing	44	102	20	.196	2	12
Peanuts Lowrey	27	58	11	.190	1	4
Babe Dahlgren	17	56	12	.214	0	6
Cy Block	9	33	12	.364	0	4
Marv Rickert	8	26	7	.269	0	1
Paul Gillespie	5	16	4	.250	2	4
Whitey Platt	4	16	1	.063	0	2
Marv Felderman	3	6	1	.167	0	0

=== Pitching ===
==== Starting pitchers ====
Note: G = Games pitched; IP = Innings pitched; W = Wins; L = Losses; ERA = Earned run average; SO = Strikeouts

Player	G	IP	W	L	ERA	SO
Claude Passeau	35	278.1	19	14	2.68	89
Bill Lee	32	219.2	13	13	3.85	75
Lon Warneke	15	99.0	5	7	2.27	28
Hank Wyse	4	28.0	2	1	1.93	8

==== Other pitchers ====
Note: G = Games pitched; IP = Innings pitched; W = Wins; L = Losses; ERA = Earned run average; SO = Strikeouts

Player	G	IP	W	L	ERA	SO
Hi Bithorn	38	171.1	9	14	3.68	65
Vern Olsen	32	140.1	6	9	4.49	46
Bill Fleming	33	134.1	5	6	3.01	59
Johnny Schmitz	23	86.2	3	7	3.43	51
Jake Mooty	19	84.1	2	5	4.70	28
Paul Erickson	18	63.0	1	6	5.43	26
Ed Hanyzewski	6	19.0	1	1	3.79	6

==== Relief pitchers ====
Note: G = Games pitched; W = Wins; L = Losses; SV = Saves; ERA = Earned run average; SO = Strikeouts

Player	G	W	L	SV	ERA	SO
Tot Pressnell	27	1	1	4	5.49	9
Dick Errickson	13	1	1	0	4.13	9
Jesse Flores	4	0	1	0	3.38	6
Vallie Eaves	2	0	0	0	9.00	0
Joe Berry	2	0	0	0	18.00	1
Emil Kush	1	0	0	0	0.00	1
Bob Bowman	1	0	0	0	0.00	0

== Farm system ==
Level	Team	League	Manager
AA	Los Angeles Angels	Pacific Coast League	Jigger Statz
A1	Tulsa Oilers	Texas League	Roy Johnson
B	Madison Blues	Illinois–Indiana–Iowa League	Wally Millies
B	Portsmouth Cubs	Piedmont League	Tony Lazzeri
B	Macon Peaches	Sally League	Milt Stock
B	Vancouver Capilanos	Western International League	Don Osborn
C	Zanesville Cubs	Middle Atlantic League	Jack Warner
D	Lake Charles Skippers	Evangeline League	Joe Bratcher
D	Americus Pioneers	Georgia–Florida League	Jerome Tiemann
D	Ashland Colonels	Mountain State League	Eddie Hock
D	Janesville Cubs	Wisconsin State League	Eddie Stumpf

LEAGUE CHAMPIONS: Macon, Vancouver, Ashland Evangeline League folded, May 30, 1942
