= Huck Geary =

American baseball player (1917–1981)

- Shortstop
- Born: January 22, 1917; Buffalo, New York, U.S.
- Died: January 27, 1981 (aged 64); Cuba, New York, U.S.
- Batted: Left Threw: Right

MLB debut
- July 17, 1942, for the Pittsburgh Pirates

Last appearance
- July 16, 1943, for the Pittsburgh Pirates

MLB statistics
- Batting average: .160
- Home runs: 1
- Runs batted in: 15
- Stats at Baseball Reference

Teams
- Pittsburgh Pirates (1942–1943)

Eugene Francis Joseph "Huck" Geary (January 22, 1917 – January 27, 1981) was a Major League Baseball player. A right-handed shortstop who batted from the left side, Geary had a listed weight of 170 pounds (77 kg).

Geary appeared in 55 games with the Pittsburgh Pirates in 1942 and 1943, compiling a relatively low .160 batting average and .437 OPS during that time. He did display a good batting eye, drawing 20 walks and striking out only nine times in 188 at bats. Geary caused some consternation for manager Frankie Frisch by repeatedly returning home to his wife and children without first receiving permission from the club. In August 1942, he sent a telegram to the club saying "Cannot play ball in my present condition. May retire for remainder of season." He told The Buffalo News he "guessed maybe" he had not told the club before leaving but that his doctor told him he was "on the verge of a complete breakdown" and in need of "a long rest." Before the 1943 season, he told the Pittsburgh Post-Gazette that he felt "fine" but that his "stomach" would occasionally act up. He said that the doctors had a "long name" for his condition but he did not remember what it was. To cover for Geary in the press, Frisch attributed his various absences to a period of convalescence from "stomach and nervous trouble".

In his autobiography Veeck – As In Wreck, Bill Veeck relates a story about Geary and second baseman Eddie Stanky. Stanky was leading off for the Chicago Cubs in his first major league game on April 21, 1943, and the first pitch he saw as a batter hit him right in the head. After recovering his bearings, Stanky proceeded to first base, and when the second batter hit a slow ground ball, Stanky made a hard slide at second in an attempt to show that he was unfazed by the beaning. Geary was the shortstop on the play, and when Stanky cut his legs out from under him, he was injured. According to Veeck, there was some doubt that Geary would ever play again, and he did leave the majors for good at the end of that year. The play had the effect of establishing Stanky's reputation in the league as a tough player.

In a 14-inning game against the Boston Braves on June 1, 1943, Geary enjoyed one of the more significant accomplishments of his career, scoring the game's winning run by stealing home plate.

Geary was inducted into the United States Navy in April 1945 and reported to Sampson Naval Training Station.

By 1946, Geary had been sent to the Hollywood Stars of the class AAA Pacific Coast League. A series of injuries to Pirate regulars, including infielders Bob Elliott, Billy Cox, and Frank Gustine, created an opportunity for Geary to return to the majors in September, but he was unwilling or unable to return, notifying the team that he would be of no further service for the remainder of the year.

The Pirates sold Geary's contract to the Indianapolis Indians of the American Association during that offseason, along with those of several other players: Maurice Van Robays, Bud Stewart, Ben Guintini, Aldon "Lefty" Wilkie, Alf Anderson, Ebba St. Claire, Don Kerr, and Carl Cox.

A native of Buffalo, New York, Geary died in Cuba, New York, 5 days after his 64th birthday.
