= 1942 New York Giants (MLB) season =

1942 New York Giants
- League: National League
- Ballpark: Polo Grounds
- City: New York City
- Record: 85–67 (.559)
- League place: 3rd
- Owners: Horace Stoneham
- General managers: Bill Terry
- Managers: Mel Ott
- Radio: WOR (Mel Allen, Connie Desmond)

The 1942 New York Giants season was the franchise's 60th season. The team finished in third place in the National League with an 85–67 record, 20 games behind the St. Louis Cardinals.

== Offseason ==
- Prior to 1942 season: Al Sima was signed as an amateur free agent by the Giants.

== Regular season ==
=== Season standings ===
National League
Team	W	L	Pct.	GB	Home	Road
St. Louis Cardinals	106	48	.688	—	60‍–‍17	46‍–‍31
Brooklyn Dodgers	104	50	.675	2	57‍–‍22	47‍–‍28
New York Giants	85	67	.559	20	47‍–‍31	38‍–‍36
Cincinnati Reds	76	76	.500	29	38‍–‍39	38‍–‍37
Pittsburgh Pirates	66	81	.449	36½	41‍–‍34	25‍–‍47
Chicago Cubs	68	86	.442	38	36‍–‍41	32‍–‍45
Boston Braves	59	89	.399	44	33‍–‍36	26‍–‍53
Philadelphia Phils	42	109	.278	62½	23‍–‍51	19‍–‍58

=== Record vs. opponents ===
1942 National League record Sources:
Team	BSN	BRO	CHC	CIN	NYG	PHI	PIT	STL
Boston	—	6–16	13–9	5–16–1	8–12	14–8	7–12–1	6–16
Brooklyn	16–6	—	16–6	15–7	14–8–1	18–4	16–6	9–13
Chicago	9–13	6–16	—	13–9	9–13–1	14–8	11–11	6–16
Cincinnati	16–5–1	7–15	9–13	—	9–13	16–6	12–9–1	7–15
New York	12–8	8–14–1	13–9–1	13–9	—	17–5	15–7	7–15
Philadelphia	8–14	4–18	8–14	6–16	5–17	—	6–13	5–17
Pittsburgh	12–7–1	6–16	11–11	9–12–1	7–15	13–6	—	8–14–2
St. Louis	16–6	13–9	16–6	15–7	15–7	17–5	14–8–2	—

=== Opening Day lineup ===
- Billy Werber 3b
- Billy Jurges ss
- Mel Ott rf
- Johnny Mize 1b
- Willard Marshall lf
- Hank Leiber cf
- Harry Danning c
- Mickey Witek 2b
- Carl Hubbell p

=== Roster ===
1942 New York Giants
Roster
Pitchers: 27 Ace Adams; 12 Bob Carpenter; 20 Hugh East; 18 Harry Feldman; 11 Carl Hubbell; 21 Dave Koslo; 22 Bill Lohrman; 10 Bill McGee; 15 Cliff Melton; 20 Van Mungo; 17 Hal Schumacher; 16 Tom Sunkel; 19 Bill Voiselle	Catchers: 9 Ray Berres; 3 Harry Danning; 21 Charlie Fox; 24 Gus Mancuso; Infielders: 14 Dick Bartell; 1 Sid Gordon; 2 Billy Jurges; 3 Johnny Mize; 6 Connie Ryan; 1 Billy Werber; 25 Mickey Witek	Outfielders: 23 Babe Barna; 5 Hank Leiber; 2 Willard Marshall; 26 Buster Maynard; 19 Howie Moss; 4 Mel Ott; 28 Babe Young	Manager: 4 Mel Ott; Coaches: 30 Bubber Jonnard; 31 Adolfo Luque

== Player stats ==
=== Batting ===
==== Starters by position ====
Note: Pos = Position; G = Games played; AB = At bats; H = Hits; Avg. = Batting average; HR = Home runs; RBI = Runs batted in

Pos	Player	G	AB	H	Avg.	HR	RBI
C	Harry Danning	119	408	114	.279	1	34
1B	Johnny Mize	142	541	165	.305	26	110
2B	Mickey Witek	148	553	144	.260	5	48
SS	Billy Jurges	127	464	119	.256	2	30
3B	Billy Werber	98	370	76	.205	1	13
OF	Mel Ott	152	549	162	.295	30	93
OF	Babe Barna	104	331	85	.257	6	58
OF	Willard Marshall	116	401	103	.257	11	59

==== Other batters ====
Note: G = Games played; AB = At bats; H = Hits; Avg. = Batting average; HR = Home runs; RBI = Runs batted in

Player	G	AB	H	Avg.	HR	RBI
Dick Bartell	90	316	77	.244	5	24
Babe Young	101	287	80	.279	11	59
Buster Maynard	89	190	47	.247	4	32
Hank Leiber	58	147	32	.218	4	23
Gus Mancuso	39	109	21	.193	0	8
Ray Berres	12	32	6	.188	0	1
Connie Ryan	11	27	5	.185	0	2
Sid Gordon	6	19	6	.316	0	2
Howie Moss	7	14	0	.000	0	0
Charlie Fox	3	7	3	.429	0	1

=== Pitching ===
==== Starting pitchers ====
Note: G = Games pitched; IP = Innings pitched; W = Wins; L = Losses; ERA = Earned run average; SO = Strikeouts

Player	G	IP	W	L	ERA	SO
Hal Schumacher	29	216.0	12	13	3.04	49
Bob Carpenter	28	185.2	11	10	3.15	53
Bill Lohrman	26	158.0	13	4	2.56	41
Carl Hubbell	24	157.1	11	8	3.95	61
Cliff Melton	23	143.2	11	5	2.63	61
Hank Leiber	1	9.0	0	1	6.00	5

==== Other pitchers ====
Note: G = Games pitched; IP = Innings pitched; W = Wins; L = Losses; ERA = Earned run average; SO = Strikeouts

Player	G	IP	W	L	ERA	SO
Harry Feldman	31	114.0	7	1	3.16	49
Bill McGee	31	104.0	6	3	2.94	40
Dave Koslo	19	78.0	3	6	5.08	42
Tom Sunkel	19	63.2	3	6	4.81	29
Van Mungo	9	36.1	1	2	5.94	27
Bill Voiselle	2	9.0	0	1	2.00	5
Hugh East	4	7.1	0	2	9.82	2

==== Relief pitchers ====
Note: G = Games pitched; W = Wins; L = Losses; SV = Saves; ERA = Earned run average; SO = Strikeouts

Player	G	W	L	SV	ERA	SO
Ace Adams	61	7	4	11	1.84	33

== Farm system ==
Level	Team	League	Manager
AA	Jersey City Giants	International League	Frank Snyder
A1	Oklahoma City Indians	Texas League	Homer Peel, Jimmy Payton, John Kroner and Clay Touchstone
B	Jacksonville Tars	Sally League	Babe Ganzel
C	Fort Smith Giants	Western Association	Freddie Lindstrom
D	Bristol Twins	Appalachian League	Hal Gruber
D	Natchez Giants	Evangeline League	Herschel Bobo
D	Salisbury Giants	North Carolina State League	Johnnie Heving
D	Oshkosh Giants	Wisconsin State League	Fred Schulte

LEAGUE CHAMPIONS: Fort Smith, Bristol

Evangeline League folded, May 30, 1942
