= List of Major League Baseball 100 win seasons =

Throughout 147 seasons (from 1876 to 2025, excluding the shortened seasons of 1972, 1981, 1994-1995, and 2020), 121 teams have won 100 or more games in a single Major League Baseball season. While this makes the feat a relatively common occurrence, the 100-win threshold remains the hallmark of the best teams in a given season.

The franchise with the most 100-win seasons is the New York Yankees, who have done so 21 times, with the Los Angeles Dodgers being second with 12 occasions. Sixty different managers have led a team to a 100-win season, with only one occasion where a 100-win team was led by multiple managers. Twenty-four managers have led a franchise to two or more 100-win seasons; Sparky Anderson, Whitey Herzog, Tony La Russa, Dusty Baker and Buck Showalter are the only managers to have led multiple franchises to a 100-win season. Joe McCarthy, Bobby Cox, and Dave Roberts are tied for the most 100-win seasons by a manager with six. Six of the 30 major league franchises have never recorded a season with 100 wins. (Note: The six franchises are the Toronto Blue Jays, Texas Rangers, Miami Marlins, Washington Nationals, San Diego Padres, and the Colorado Rockies.) Among rookie managers, seven have accomplished 100 wins in their inaugural season, with the first being Mickey Cochrane in 1934 and the last being Rocco Baldelli in 2019. 68 of the 116 100-win teams have advanced to the World Series (.586), with 38 of them going on to win the Series (for a percentage of .559), while 23 teams that have won 100 games have lost in the first round of the postseason, with 22 being in the Division Series and one being in the Wild Card Series (introduced in 2022 full-time). The 2001 Seattle Mariners and 1906 Chicago Cubs hold the single-season record with 116 wins. The 2026 season concluded with only the Milwaukee Brewers and Los Angeles Dodgers achieving at least 100 wins, the Brewers with 103 and the Dodgers with 100. It was the Brewers' first time reaching the 100-win milestone.

Listed below are the Major League Baseball franchises that have had seasons with 100 or more wins.

== Distinctions ==
On eight occasions, the level of high-quality competition within a league or division has resulted in a team winning 100 games but still failing to qualify for postseason play. Six of these eight seasons occurred before the start of the two-division league structure and expanded playoff format introduced in 1969, and none have occurred since the first year under the Divisional Series format in 1995.

While there have been 30 seasons with two or more 100-win teams, only 11 times have at least three teams finished at or above the mark, and 2019 and 2022 are the only instances of four teams finishing at or above the 100-win threshold.

| Season | Team #1 | Team #2 | Team #3 | Team #4 |
|---|---|---|---|---|
| 1942 | St. Louis Cardinals, NL (106–48) (.688) | Brooklyn Dodgers, NL (104–50) (.675) | New York Yankees, AL (103–51) (.669) | |
| 1977 | Kansas City Royals, AL (102–60) (.630) | Philadelphia Phillies, NL (101–61) (.623) | New York Yankees, AL (100–62) (.617) | |
| 1998 | New York Yankees, AL (114–48) (.704) | Atlanta Braves, NL (106–56) (.654) | Houston Astros, NL (102–60) (.630) | |
| 2002 | New York Yankees, AL (103–58) (.640) | Oakland Athletics, AL (103–59) (.636) | Atlanta Braves, NL (101–59) (.631) | |
| 2003 | New York Yankees, AL (101–61) (.623) | Atlanta Braves, NL (101–61) (.623) | San Francisco Giants, NL (100–61) (.621) | |
| 2017 | Los Angeles Dodgers, NL (104–58) (.642) | Cleveland Indians, AL (102–60) (.630) | Houston Astros, AL (101–61) (.623) | |
| 2018 | Boston Red Sox, AL (108–54) (.667) | Houston Astros, AL (103–59) (.636), | New York Yankees, AL (100–62) (.617) | |
| 2019 | Houston Astros, AL (107–55) (.660) | Los Angeles Dodgers, NL (106–56) (.654) | New York Yankees, AL (103–59) (.636) | Minnesota Twins, AL (101–61) (.623) |
| 2021 | San Francisco Giants, NL (107–55) (.660), | Los Angeles Dodgers, NL (106–56) (.654), | Tampa Bay Rays, AL (100–62) (.617) | |
| 2022 | Los Angeles Dodgers, NL (111–51) (.685) | Houston Astros, AL (106–56) (.654) | Atlanta Braves, NL (101–61) (.623) | New York Mets, NL (101–61) (.623) |
| 2023 | Atlanta Braves, NL (104–58) (.642) | Baltimore Orioles, AL (101–61) (.623) | Los Angeles Dodgers, NL (100–62) (.617) | |

The 2018 season was the first time either league had more than two teams win 100 or more games in the same season; the Boston Red Sox, Houston Astros, and New York Yankees of the American League each won 100 or more games, with two led by rookie managers (no season had ever seen more than 100 wins from two managers before). There were no 100-win teams in the National League that season. The 2019 season marked the first time four Major League teams won 100 or more games, with the American League's Houston Astros, New York Yankees, and Minnesota Twins winning their divisions with at least 100 wins, and the Los Angeles Dodgers of the National League doing the same.

With the Divisional Series and Wild Card format in place today, it is extremely unlikely for a team with a 100-win regular season to fail to qualify for at least a Wild Card berth. Only the 2001 Oakland Athletics, the 2018 New York Yankees, the 2021 Los Angeles Dodgers and the 2022 New York Mets made the playoffs as 100-win Wild Card teams.

The following teams missed the postseason despite winning 100 games or more during the regular season:

- 1909 Chicago Cubs (104–49) (.680): Finished 2nd in NL
- 1915 Detroit Tigers (100–54) (.649): Finished 2nd in AL
- 1942 Brooklyn Dodgers (104–50) (.675): Finished 2nd in NL
- 1954 New York Yankees (103–51) (.669): Finished 2nd in AL
- 1961 Detroit Tigers (101–61) (.623): Finished 2nd in AL
- 1962 Los Angeles Dodgers (102–63 [101-61 + 1-2 playoff against San Francisco Giants]) (.618): Finished 2nd in NL
- 1980 Baltimore Orioles (100–62) (.617): Finished 2nd in AL East
- 1993 San Francisco Giants (103–59) (.636): Finished 2nd in NL West

Of the 30 MLB teams, only the Colorado Rockies, Miami Marlins, San Diego Padres, Texas Rangers, Toronto Blue Jays, and Washington Nationals have never posted a 100-win season.

== Legend ==
| † | Denotes manager to do so as a rookie |
| Manager (X) | Denotes the number of times the manager has won 100 games |
| **Bold** | Denotes manager whose team won championship that year |

== Season records ==
| Season | Franchise | League | Wins | Losses | % | Manager | Finish |
|---|---|---|---|---|---|---|---|
| 1892 | Boston Beaneaters | NL | 102 | 48 | .680 | Frank Selee | Won National League |
| 1898 | Boston Beaneaters | NL | 102 | 47 | .685 | Frank Selee (2) | Won National League |
| 1899 | Brooklyn Superbas | NL | 101 | 47 | .682 | Ned Hanlon | Won National League |
| 1902 | Pittsburgh Pirates | NL | 103 | 36 | .741 | Fred Clarke | Won National League |
| 1904 | New York Giants | NL | 106 | 47 | .693 | John McGraw | Won National League |
| 1905 | New York Giants | NL | 105 | 48 | .686 | John McGraw (2) | **Won 1905 World Series** |
| 1906 | Chicago Cubs | NL | 116 | 36 | .763 | Frank Chance | Lost 1906 World Series |
| 1907 | Chicago Cubs | NL | 107 | 45 | .704 | Frank Chance (2) | **Won 1907 World Series** |
| 1909 | Pittsburgh Pirates | NL | 110 | 42 | .724 | Fred Clarke (2) | **Won 1909 World Series** |
| 1909 | Chicago Cubs | NL | 104 | 49 | .680 | Frank Chance (3) | Finished 2nd in NL |
| 1910 | Chicago Cubs | NL | 104 | 50 | .675 | Frank Chance (4) | Lost 1910 World Series |
| 1910 | Philadelphia Athletics | AL | 102 | 48 | .680 | Connie Mack | **Won 1910 World Series** |
| 1911 | Philadelphia Athletics | AL | 101 | 50 | .669 | Connie Mack (2) | **Won 1911 World Series** |
| 1912 | Boston Red Sox | AL | 105 | 47 | .691 | Jake Stahl | **Won 1912 World Series** |
| 1912 | New York Giants | NL | 103 | 48 | .682 | John McGraw (3) | Lost 1912 World Series |
| 1913 | New York Giants | NL | 101 | 51 | .664 | John McGraw (4) | Lost 1913 World Series |
| 1915 | Boston Red Sox | AL | 101 | 50 | .669 | Bill Carrigan | **Won 1915 World Series** |
| 1915 | Detroit Tigers | AL | 100 | 54 | .649 | Hughie Jennings | Finished 2nd in AL |
| 1917 | Chicago White Sox | AL | 100 | 54 | .649 | Pants Rowland | **Won 1917 World Series** |
| 1927 | New York Yankees | AL | 110 | 44 | .714 | Miller Huggins | **Won 1927 World Series** |
| 1928 | New York Yankees | AL | 101 | 53 | .656 | Miller Huggins (2) | **Won 1928 World Series** |
| 1929 | Philadelphia Athletics | AL | 104 | 46 | .693 | Connie Mack (3) | **Won 1929 World Series** |
| 1930 | Philadelphia Athletics | AL | 102 | 52 | .662 | Connie Mack (4) | **Won 1930 World Series** |
| 1931 | Philadelphia Athletics | AL | 107 | 45 | .704 | Connie Mack (5) | Lost 1931 World Series |
| 1931 | St. Louis Cardinals | NL | 101 | 53 | .656 | Gabby Street | **Won 1931 World Series** |
| 1932 | New York Yankees | AL | 107 | 47 | .695 | Joe McCarthy | **Won 1932 World Series** |
| 1934 | Detroit Tigers | AL | 101 | 53 | .656 | Mickey Cochrane† | Lost 1934 World Series |
| 1935 | Chicago Cubs | NL | 100 | 54 | .649 | Charlie Grimm | Lost 1935 World Series |
| 1936 | New York Yankees | AL | 102 | 51 | .667 | Joe McCarthy (2) | **Won 1936 World Series** |
| 1937 | New York Yankees | AL | 102 | 52 | .662 | Joe McCarthy (3) | **Won 1937 World Series** |
| 1939 | New York Yankees | AL | 106 | 45 | .702 | Joe McCarthy (4) | **Won 1939 World Series** |
| 1940 | Cincinnati Reds | NL | 100 | 53 | .654 | Bill McKechnie | **Won 1940 World Series** |
| 1941 | New York Yankees | AL | 101 | 53 | .656 | Joe McCarthy (5) | **Won 1941 World Series** |
| 1941 | Brooklyn Dodgers | NL | 100 | 54 | .649 | Leo Durocher | Lost 1941 World Series |
| 1942 | St. Louis Cardinals | NL | 106 | 48 | .688 | Billy Southworth | **Won 1942 World Series** |
| 1942 | Brooklyn Dodgers | NL | 104 | 50 | .675 | Leo Durocher (2) | Finished 2nd in NL |
| 1942 | New York Yankees | AL | 103 | 51 | .669 | Joe McCarthy (6) | Lost 1942 World Series |
| 1943 | St. Louis Cardinals | NL | 105 | 49 | .682 | Billy Southworth (2) | Lost 1943 World Series |
| 1944 | St. Louis Cardinals | NL | 105 | 49 | .682 | Billy Southworth (3) | **Won 1944 World Series** |
| 1946 | Boston Red Sox | AL | 104 | 50 | .675 | Joe Cronin | Lost 1946 World Series |
| 1953 | Brooklyn Dodgers | NL | 105 | 49 | .682 | Chuck Dressen | Lost 1953 World Series |
| 1954 | Cleveland Indians | AL | 111 | 43 | .721 | Al López | Lost 1954 World Series |
| 1954 | New York Yankees | AL | 103 | 51 | .669 | Casey Stengel | Finished 2nd in AL |
| 1961 | New York Yankees | AL | 109 | 53 | .673 | Ralph Houk† | **Won 1961 World Series** |
| 1961 | Detroit Tigers | AL | 101 | 61 | .623 | Bob Scheffing | Finished 2nd in AL |
| 1962 | San Francisco Giants | NL | 103 | 62 | .624 | Al Dark | Lost 1962 World Series |
| 1962 | Los Angeles Dodgers | NL | 102 | 63 | .618 | Walter Alston | Finished 2nd in NL |
| 1963 | New York Yankees | AL | 104 | 57 | .646 | Ralph Houk (2) | Lost 1963 World Series |
| 1965 | Minnesota Twins | AL | 102 | 60 | .630 | Sam Mele | Lost 1965 World Series |
| 1967 | St. Louis Cardinals | NL | 101 | 60 | .627 | Red Schoendienst | **Won 1967 World Series** |
| 1968 | Detroit Tigers | AL | 103 | 59 | .636 | Mayo Smith | **Won 1968 World Series** |
| 1969 | Baltimore Orioles | AL | 109 | 53 | .673 | Earl Weaver | Lost 1969 World Series |
| 1969 | New York Mets | NL | 100 | 62 | .617 | Gil Hodges | **Won 1969 World Series** |
| 1970 | Baltimore Orioles | AL | 108 | 54 | .667 | Earl Weaver (2) | **Won 1970 World Series** |
| 1970 | Cincinnati Reds | NL | 102 | 60 | .630 | Sparky Anderson† | Lost 1970 World Series |
| 1971 | Baltimore Orioles | AL | 101 | 57 | .639 | Earl Weaver (3) | Lost 1971 World Series |
| 1971 | Oakland Athletics | AL | 101 | 60 | .627 | Dick Williams | Lost 1971 ALCS |
| 1974 | Los Angeles Dodgers | NL | 102 | 60 | .630 | Walter Alston (2) | Lost 1974 World Series |
| 1975 | Cincinnati Reds | NL | 108 | 54 | .667 | Sparky Anderson (2) | **Won 1975 World Series** |
| 1976 | Cincinnati Reds | NL | 102 | 60 | .630 | Sparky Anderson (3) | **Won 1976 World Series** |
| 1976 | Philadelphia Phillies | NL | 101 | 61 | .623 | Danny Ozark | Lost 1976 NLCS |
| 1977 | Kansas City Royals | AL | 102 | 60 | .630 | Whitey Herzog | Lost 1977 ALCS |
| 1977 | Philadelphia Phillies | NL | 101 | 61 | .623 | Danny Ozark (2) | Lost 1977 NLCS |
| 1977 | New York Yankees | AL | 100 | 62 | .617 | Billy Martin | **Won 1977 World Series** |
| 1978 | New York Yankees | AL | 100 | 63 | .613 | Billy Martin; Dick Howser; Bob Lemon (Note: After starting the season 52–42, Martin resigned, with Howser serving as interim manager in a loss before Lemon went 48–20 in the remaining 68 games, which included a one-game tiebreaker for the AL East where they won their 100th game. This team and the 1962 Giants and Dodgers are the only 100-win teams that participated in a tiebreaker game to determine a playoff team.) | **Won 1978 World Series** |
| 1979 | Baltimore Orioles | AL | 102 | 57 | .642 | Earl Weaver (4) | Lost 1979 World Series |
| 1980 | New York Yankees | AL | 103 | 59 | .636 | Dick Howser | Lost 1980 ALCS |
| 1980 | Baltimore Orioles | AL | 100 | 62 | .617 | Earl Weaver (5) | Finished 2nd in AL East |
| 1984 | Detroit Tigers | AL | 104 | 58 | .642 | Sparky Anderson (4) | **Won 1984 World Series** |
| 1985 | St. Louis Cardinals | NL | 101 | 61 | .623 | Whitey Herzog (2) | Lost 1985 World Series |
| 1986 | New York Mets | NL | 108 | 54 | .667 | Davey Johnson | **Won 1986 World Series** |
| 1988 | Oakland Athletics | AL | 104 | 58 | .642 | Tony La Russa | Lost 1988 World Series |
| 1988 | New York Mets | NL | 100 | 60 | .625 | Davey Johnson (2) | Lost 1988 NLCS |
| 1990 | Oakland Athletics | AL | 103 | 59 | .636 | Tony La Russa (2) | Lost 1990 World Series |
| 1993 | Atlanta Braves | NL | 104 | 58 | .642 | Bobby Cox | Lost 1993 NLCS |
| 1993 | San Francisco Giants | NL | 103 | 59 | .636 | Dusty Baker† | Finished 2nd in NL West |
| 1995 | Cleveland Indians | AL | 100 | 44 | .694 | Mike Hargrove | Lost 1995 World Series |
| 1997 | Atlanta Braves | NL | 101 | 61 | .623 | Bobby Cox (2) | Lost 1997 NLCS |
| 1998 | New York Yankees | AL | 114 | 48 | .704 | Joe Torre | **Won 1998 World Series** |
| 1998 | Atlanta Braves | NL | 106 | 56 | .654 | Bobby Cox (3) | Lost 1998 NLCS |
| 1998 | Houston Astros | NL | 102 | 60 | .630 | Larry Dierker | Lost 1998 NLDS |
| 1999 | Atlanta Braves | NL | 103 | 59 | .636 | Bobby Cox (4) | Lost 1999 World Series |
| 1999 | Arizona Diamondbacks | NL | 100 | 62 | .617 | Buck Showalter | Lost 1999 NLDS |
| 2001 | Seattle Mariners | AL | 116 | 46 | .716 | Lou Piniella | Lost 2001 ALCS |
| 2001 | Oakland Athletics | AL | 102 | 60 | .630 | Art Howe | Lost 2001 ALDS |
| 2002 | New York Yankees | AL | 103 | 58 | .640 | Joe Torre (2) | Lost 2002 ALDS |
| 2002 | Oakland Athletics | AL | 103 | 59 | .636 | Art Howe (2) | Lost 2002 ALDS |
| 2002 | Atlanta Braves | NL | 101 | 59 | .631 | Bobby Cox (5) | Lost 2002 NLDS |
| 2003 | New York Yankees | AL | 101 | 61 | .623 | Joe Torre (3) | Lost 2003 World Series |
| 2003 | Atlanta Braves | NL | 101 | 61 | .623 | Bobby Cox (6) | Lost 2003 NLDS |
| 2003 | San Francisco Giants | NL | 100 | 61 | .621 | Felipe Alou | Lost 2003 NLDS |
| 2004 | St. Louis Cardinals | NL | 105 | 57 | .648 | Tony La Russa (3) | Lost 2004 World Series |
| 2004 | New York Yankees | AL | 101 | 61 | .623 | Joe Torre (4) | Lost 2004 ALCS |
| 2005 | St. Louis Cardinals | NL | 100 | 62 | .617 | Tony La Russa (4) | Lost 2005 NLCS |
| 2008 | Los Angeles Angels of Anaheim | AL | 100 | 62 | .617 | Mike Scoscia | Lost 2008 ALDS |
| 2009 | New York Yankees | AL | 103 | 59 | .636 | Joe Girardi | **Won 2009 World Series** |
| 2011 | Philadelphia Phillies | NL | 102 | 60 | .630 | Charlie Manuel | Lost 2011 NLDS |
| 2015 | St. Louis Cardinals | NL | 100 | 62 | .617 | Mike Matheny | Lost 2015 NLDS |
| 2016 | Chicago Cubs | NL | 103 | 58 | .640 | Joe Maddon | **Won 2016 World Series** |
| 2017 | Los Angeles Dodgers | NL | 104 | 58 | .642 | Dave Roberts | Lost 2017 World Series |
| 2017 | Cleveland Indians | AL | 102 | 60 | .630 | Terry Francona | Lost 2017 ALDS |
| 2017 | Houston Astros | AL | 101 | 61 | .623 | A. J. Hinch | **Won 2017 World Series** |
| 2018 | Boston Red Sox | AL | 108 | 54 | .667 | Alex Cora† | **Won 2018 World Series** |
| 2018 | Houston Astros | AL | 103 | 59 | .636 | A. J. Hinch (2) | Lost 2018 ALCS |
| 2018 | New York Yankees | AL | 100 | 62 | .617 | Aaron Boone† | Lost 2018 ALDS |
| 2019 | Houston Astros | AL | 107 | 55 | .660 | A. J. Hinch (3) | Lost 2019 World Series |
| 2019 | Los Angeles Dodgers | NL | 106 | 56 | .654 | Dave Roberts (2) | Lost 2019 NLDS |
| 2019 | New York Yankees | AL | 103 | 59 | .636 | Aaron Boone (2) | Lost 2019 ALCS |
| 2019 | Minnesota Twins | AL | 101 | 61 | .623 | Rocco Baldelli† | Lost 2019 ALDS |
| 2021 | San Francisco Giants | NL | 107 | 55 | .660 | Gabe Kapler | Lost 2021 NLDS |
| 2021 | Los Angeles Dodgers | NL | 106 | 56 | .654 | Dave Roberts (3) | Lost 2021 NLCS |
| 2021 | Tampa Bay Rays | AL | 100 | 62 | .617 | Kevin Cash | Lost 2021 ALDS |
| 2022 | Los Angeles Dodgers | NL | 111 | 51 | .685 | Dave Roberts (4) | Lost 2022 NLDS |
| 2022 | Houston Astros | AL | 106 | 56 | .654 | Dusty Baker (2) | **Won 2022 World Series** |
| 2022 | Atlanta Braves | NL | 101 | 61 | .623 | Brian Snitker | Lost 2022 NLDS |
| 2022 | New York Mets | NL | 101 | 61 | .623 | Buck Showalter (2) | Lost 2022 NL Wild Card |
| 2023 | Atlanta Braves | NL | 104 | 58 | .642 | Brian Snitker (2) | Lost 2023 NLDS |
| 2023 | Baltimore Orioles | AL | 101 | 61 | .623 | Brandon Hyde | Lost 2023 ALDS |
| 2023 | Los Angeles Dodgers | NL | 100 | 62 | .617 | Dave Roberts (5) | Lost 2023 NLDS |
| 2026 | Milwaukee Brewers | NL | 103 | 59 | .636 | Pat Murphy | **Won 2026 World Series** |
| 2026 | Los Angeles Dodgers | NL | 100 | 62 | .617 | Dave Roberts (6) | Lost 2026 NLCS |

== See also ==
- List of best Major League Baseball season win–loss records
