= 1942 Brooklyn Dodgers season =

1942 Brooklyn Dodgers
- League: National League
- Ballpark: Ebbets Field
- City: Brooklyn, New York
- Record: 104–50 (.675)
- League place: 2nd
- Owners: James & Dearie Mulvey, Brooklyn Trust Company
- President: Larry MacPhail
- Managers: Leo Durocher
- Radio: WHN, WOR; Red Barber, Alan Hale

The 1942 Brooklyn Dodgers team won 104 games in the season, but fell two games short of the St. Louis Cardinals in the National League pennant race. The Dodgers' 104 wins tied the 1909 Chicago Cubs for the most wins by a team that failed to finish first in its league (or, since 1969, division); this record lasted until 2021, when the Dodgers won 106 games but finished a game behind the San Francisco Giants in the NL West.

== Offseason ==
- December 9, 1941: Heinie Mueller was purchased by the Dodgers from the Philadelphia Phillies.
- December 10, 1941: Mace Brown was purchased from the Dodgers the Boston Red Sox.
- December 10, 1941: Don Padgett was purchased by the Dodgers from the St. Louis Cardinals.
- December 10, 1941: Johnny Rizzo was purchased by the Dodgers from the Philadelphia Phillies.
- December 12, 1941: Pete Coscarart, Luke Hamlin, Babe Phelps and Jimmy Wasdell were traded by the Dodgers to the Pittsburgh Pirates in exchange for Arky Vaughan.
- March 13, 1942: Billy Sullivan was purchased by the Dodgers from the Detroit Tigers.
- March 23, 1942: Frenchy Bordagaray was purchased by the Dodgers from the New York Yankees.
- Prior to 1942 season: Steve Nagy was signed as an amateur free agent by the Dodgers.

== Regular season ==
The Dodgers were 73–30 and 10 games ahead on August 4, but the Cardinals went on to win 45 of their last 56 to grab the NL title. To exacerbate the problem, the Dodgers had also dropped several close games to St. Louis in September.

Defending NL batting champ Pete Reiser, hitting .380, was sidelined in mid-season after repeatedly crashing into the unpadded outfield wall in Ebbets Field. While he recovered from a fractured skull, Brooklyn could not keep up their early pace. A healthy Reiser may very well have made up the two-game difference.

=== Season standings ===
National League
Team	W	L	Pct.	GB	Home	Road
St. Louis Cardinals	106	48	.688	—	60‍–‍17	46‍–‍31
Brooklyn Dodgers	104	50	.675	2	57‍–‍22	47‍–‍28
New York Giants	85	67	.559	20	47‍–‍31	38‍–‍36
Cincinnati Reds	76	76	.500	29	38‍–‍39	38‍–‍37
Pittsburgh Pirates	66	81	.449	36½	41‍–‍34	25‍–‍47
Chicago Cubs	68	86	.442	38	36‍–‍41	32‍–‍45
Boston Braves	59	89	.399	44	33‍–‍36	26‍–‍53
Philadelphia Phils	42	109	.278	62½	23‍–‍51	19‍–‍58

=== Record vs. opponents ===
1942 National League record Sources:
Team	BSN	BRO	CHC	CIN	NYG	PHI	PIT	STL
Boston	—	6–16	13–9	5–16–1	8–12	14–8	7–12–1	6–16
Brooklyn	16–6	—	16–6	15–7	14–8–1	18–4	16–6	9–13
Chicago	9–13	6–16	—	13–9	9–13–1	14–8	11–11	6–16
Cincinnati	16–5–1	7–15	9–13	—	9–13	16–6	12–9–1	7–15
New York	12–8	8–14–1	13–9–1	13–9	—	17–5	15–7	7–15
Philadelphia	8–14	4–18	8–14	6–16	5–17	—	6–13	5–17
Pittsburgh	12–7–1	6–16	11–11	9–12–1	7–15	13–6	—	8–14–2
St. Louis	16–6	13–9	16–6	15–7	15–7	17–5	14–8–2	—

=== Notable transactions ===
- April 30, 1942: Schoolboy Rowe was purchased by the Dodgers from the Detroit Tigers.
- May 19, 1942: Babe Dahlgren was purchased by the Dodgers from the Chicago Cubs.
- August 30, 1942: Bobo Newsom was purchased by the Dodgers from the Washington Senators.

=== Roster ===
1942 Brooklyn Dodgers
Roster
Pitchers: 22 Johnny Allen; 25 Hugh Casey; 12 Bob Chipman; 26 Curt Davis; 14 Freddie Fitzsimmons; 20 Larry French; 23 Ed Head; 13 Kirby Higbe; 33 Chet Kehn; 21 Newt Kimball; 28 Max Macon; 8 Bobo Newsom; 8 Schoolboy Rowe; 31 Les Webber; 17 Whit Wyatt	Catchers: 19 Cliff Dapper; 10 Mickey Owen; 9 Billy Sullivan; Infielders: 4 Dolph Camilli; 12 Babe Dahlgren; 16 Billy Herman; 3 Alex Kampouris; 1 Pee Wee Reese; 18 Lew Riggs; 3 Stan Rojek; 5 Arky Vaughan	Outfielders: 37 Frenchy Bordagaray; 24 Augie Galan; 6 Joe Medwick; 27 Pete Reiser; 32 Johnny Rizzo; 11 Dixie Walker	Manager: 2 Leo Durocher; Coaches: 30 Red Corriden; 7 Charlie Dressen; 14 Freddie Fitzsimmons

== Player stats ==
= Indicates team leader

= Indicates league leader

=== Batting ===
==== Starters by position ====
Note: Pos = Position; G = Games played; AB = At bats; R = Runs; H = Hits; Avg. = Batting average; HR = Home runs; RBI = Runs batted in; SB = Stolen bases

Pos	Player	G	AB	R	H	Avg.	HR	RBI	SB
C	Mickey Owen	133	421	53	109	.259	0	44	10
1B	Dolph Camilli	150	524	89	132	.252	26	109	10
2B	Billy Herman	155	571	76	146	.256	2	65	6
3B	Arky Vaughan	128	495	82	137	.277	2	49	8
SS	Pee Wee Reese	151	564	87	144	.255	3	53	15
LF	Joe Medwick	142	553	69	166	.300	4	96	2
CF	Pete Reiser	125	480	89	149	.310	10	64	20
RF	Dixie Walker	118	393	57	114	.290	6	54	1

==== Other batters ====
Note: G = Games played; AB = At bats; R = Runs; H = Hits; Avg. = Batting average; HR = Home runs; RBI = Runs batted in; SB = Stolen bases

Player	G	AB	R	H	Avg.	HR	RBI	SB
Johnny Rizzo	78	217	31	50	.230	4	27	2
Augie Galan	69	209	24	55	.263	0	22	2
Lew Riggs	70	199	20	50	.278	3	22	0
Billy Sullivan	43	101	11	27	.267	1	14	1
Frenchy Bordagaray	48	58	11	14	.241	0	5	2
Alex Kampouris	10	21	3	5	.238	0	3	0
Babe Dahlgren	17	19	2	1	.053	0	0	0
Cliff Dapper	8	17	2	8	.471	1	9	0
Stan Rojek	1	0	1	0	----	0	0	0

=== Pitching ===
==== Starting pitchers ====
Note: G = Games pitched; GS = Games started; CG = Complete games; IP = Innings pitched; W = Wins; L = Losses; ERA = Earned run average; BB = Bases on balls; SO = Strikeouts

Player	G	GS	CG	IP	W	L	ERA	BB	SO
Kirby Higbe	38	32	13	221.2	16	11	3.25	106	115
Whit Wyatt	31	30	16	217.1	19	7	2.73	63	104
Curt Davis	32	26	13	206.0	15	6	2.36	51	60
Bobo Newsom	6	5	2	32.0	2	2	3.38	14	21
Freddie Fitzsimmons	1	1	0	3.0	0	0	15.00	1	0

==== Other pitchers ====
Note: G = Games pitched; GS = Games started; CG = Complete games; IP = Innings pitched; W = Wins; L = Losses; ERA = Earned run average; BB = Bases on balls; SO = Strikeouts

Player	G	GS	CG	IP	W	L	ERA	BB	SO
Larry French	38	14	5	147.2	15	4	1.83	36	62
Ed Head	36	15	5	136.2	10	6	3.56	47	78
Johnny Allen	27	15	5	118.0	10	6	3.20	39	50
Max Macon	14	8	4	84.0	5	3	1.93	33	27
Les Webber	19	3	1	51.2	3	2	2.96	22	23
Schoolboy Rowe	9	2	0	30.1	1	0	5.34	12	6
Chet Kehn	3	1	0	7.2	0	0	7.04	4	3

==== Relief pitchers ====
Note: G = Games pitched; IP = Innings pitched; W = Wins; L = Losses; SV = Saves; ERA = Earned run average; BB = Bases on balls; SO = Strikeouts

Player	G	IP	W	L	SV	ERA	BB	SO
Hugh Casey	50	112.0	6	3	13	2.25	44	54
Newt Kimball	14	29.1	2	0	0	3.68	19	8
Bob Chipman	2	1.1	0	0	0	0.00	2	1

== Awards and honors ==
- 1942 Major League Baseball All-Star Game
  - Arky Vaughan starter
  - Joe Medwick starter
  - Pete Reiser starter
  - Billy Herman reserve
  - Mickey Owen reserve
  - Pee Wee Reese reserve
  - Whit Wyatt reserve
- TSN Major League All-Star Team
  - Mickey Owen

=== League top five finishers ===
Dolph Camilli

- #2 in NL in home runs (26)
- #2 in NL in RBI (109)
- #3 in NL in walks (97)

Hugh Casey

- MLB leader in saves (13)

Curt Davis

- #3 in NL in ERA (2.36)

Kirby Higbe

- #3 in NL in strikeouts (115)

Ducky Medwick

- #2 in NL in doubles (37)
- #4 in NL in RBI (96)

Pistol Pete Reiser

- NL leader in stolen bases (20)
- #4 in NL in batting average (.310)

== Farm System ==
Level	Team	League	Manager
AA	Montreal Royals	International League	Clyde Sukeforth
AA	San Francisco Seals	Pacific Coast League	Lefty O'Doul
B	Durham Bulls	Piedmont League	Bruno Betzel
C	Santa Barbara Saints	California League	John Clancy
C	Dayton Ducks	Middle Atlantic League	Paul Chervinko; Howard Holmes; William McWilliams
D	Kingsport Dodgers	Appalachian League	Merle Settlemire
D	Valdosta Trojans	Georgia–Florida League	Stew Hofferth; Clancy Odell
D	Johnstown Johnnies	Pennsylvania State Association	Jay Kirke, Jr.
D	Olean Oilers	Pennsylvania–Ontario–New York League	Jake Pitler
D	Lamesa Dodgers	West Texas–New Mexico League	Joe Tate

LEAGUE CHAMPIONS: Santa Barbara
