= 1942 Cincinnati Reds season =

1942 Cincinnati Reds
- League: National League
- Ballpark: Crosley Field
- City: Cincinnati
- Owners: Powel Crosley Jr.
- General managers: Warren Giles
- Managers: Bill McKechnie
- Radio: WCPO (Sam Balter); WSAI (Roger Baker, Dick Bray); WKRC (Waite Hoyt, Dick Nesbitt)

The 1942 Cincinnati Reds season was a season in American baseball. The team finished fourth in the National League with a record of 76–76, 29 games behind the St. Louis Cardinals.

== Offseason ==
- Prior to 1942 season: Grant Dunlap was acquired from the Reds by the Cleveland Indians.

== Regular season ==
=== Season standings ===
National League
Team	W	L	Pct.	GB	Home	Road
St. Louis Cardinals	106	48	.688	—	60‍–‍17	46‍–‍31
Brooklyn Dodgers	104	50	.675	2	57‍–‍22	47‍–‍28
New York Giants	85	67	.559	20	47‍–‍31	38‍–‍36
Cincinnati Reds	76	76	.500	29	38‍–‍39	38‍–‍37
Pittsburgh Pirates	66	81	.449	36½	41‍–‍34	25‍–‍47
Chicago Cubs	68	86	.442	38	36‍–‍41	32‍–‍45
Boston Braves	59	89	.399	44	33‍–‍36	26‍–‍53
Philadelphia Phils	42	109	.278	62½	23‍–‍51	19‍–‍58

=== Record vs. opponents ===
1942 National League record Sources:
Team	BSN	BRO	CHC	CIN	NYG	PHI	PIT	STL
Boston	—	6–16	13–9	5–16–1	8–12	14–8	7–12–1	6–16
Brooklyn	16–6	—	16–6	15–7	14–8–1	18–4	16–6	9–13
Chicago	9–13	6–16	—	13–9	9–13–1	14–8	11–11	6–16
Cincinnati	16–5–1	7–15	9–13	—	9–13	16–6	12–9–1	7–15
New York	12–8	8–14–1	13–9–1	13–9	—	17–5	15–7	7–15
Philadelphia	8–14	4–18	8–14	6–16	5–17	—	6–13	5–17
Pittsburgh	12–7–1	6–16	11–11	9–12–1	7–15	13–6	—	8–14–2
St. Louis	16–6	13–9	16–6	15–7	15–7	17–5	14–8–2	—

=== Roster ===
1942 Cincinnati Reds
Roster
Pitchers: 43 Joe Beggs; 44 Ewell Blackwell; 30 Paul Derringer; 35 Whitey Moore; 41 Elmer Riddle; 35 Clyde Shoun; 37 Ray Starr; 39 Junior Thompson; 34 Jim Turner; 33 Johnny Vander Meer; 31 Bucky Walters	Catchers: 7 Rollie Hemsley; 4 Al Lakeman; 9 Ray Lamanno; 5 Dick West; Infielders: 12 Joe Abreu; 16 Chuck Aleno; 11 Lonny Frey; 18 Bert Haas; 17 Eddie Joost; 15 Bobby Mattick; 10 Frank McCormick; 16 Dee Phillips; 28 Hank Sauer	Outfielders: 23 Harry Craft; 21 Jim Gleeson; 24 Ival Goodman; 28 Frankie Kelleher; 21 Max Marshall; 20 Mike McCormick; 29 Frank Secory; 23 Eric Tipton; 29 Clyde Vollmer; 27 Gee Walker; Other batters: 25 Ernie Koy	Manager: 1 Bill McKechnie; Coaches: 3 Ray Blades; 2 Hank Gowdy

== Player stats ==
= Indicates team leader

=== Batting ===
==== Starters by position ====
Note: Pos = Position; G = Games played; AB = At bats; H = Hits; Avg. = Batting average; HR = Home runs; RBI = Runs batted in

Pos	Player	G	AB	H	Avg.	HR	RBI
C	Ray Lamanno	111	371	98	.264	12	43
1B	Frank McCormick	145	564	156	.277	13	89
2B	Lonny Frey	141	523	139	.266	2	39
SS	Eddie Joost	142	562	126	.224	6	41
3B	Bert Haas	154	585	140	.239	6	54
OF	Gee Walker	119	422	97	.230	5	50
OF	Max Marshall	131	530	135	.255	7	43
OF	Eric Tipton	63	207	46	.222	4	18

==== Other batters ====
Note: G = Games played; AB = At bats; H = Hits; Avg. = Batting average; HR = Home runs; RBI = Runs batted in

Player	G	AB	H	Avg.	HR	RBI
Ival Goodman	87	226	55	.243	0	15
Mike McCormick	40	135	32	.237	1	11
Rollie Hemsley	36	115	13	.113	0	7
Harry Craft	37	113	20	.177	0	6
Frankie Kelleher	38	110	20	.182	3	12
Dee Phillips	28	84	17	.202	0	6
Dick West	33	79	14	.177	1	8
Clyde Vollmer	12	43	4	.093	1	4
Al Lakeman	20	38	6	.158	0	2
Joe Abreu	9	28	6	.214	1	3
Jim Gleeson	9	20	4	.200	0	2
Hank Sauer	7	20	5	.250	2	4
Chuck Aleno	7	14	2	.143	0	0
Bobby Mattick	6	10	2	.200	0	0
Frank Secory	2	5	0	.000	0	1
Ernie Koy	3	2	0	.000	0	0

=== Pitching ===
==== Starting pitchers ====
Note: G = Games pitched; IP = Innings pitched; W = Wins; L = Losses; ERA = Earned run average; SO = Strikeouts

Player	G	IP	W	L	ERA	SO
Ray Starr	37	276.2	15	13	2.67	83
Bucky Walters	34	253.2	15	14	2.66	109
Johnny Vander Meer	33	244.0	18	12	2.43	186
Paul Derringer	29	208.2	10	11	3.06	68

==== Other pitchers ====
Note: G = Games pitched; IP = Innings pitched; W = Wins; L = Losses; ERA = Earned run average; SO = Strikeouts

Player	G	IP	W	L	ERA	SO
Elmer Riddle	29	158.1	7	11	3.69	78
Junior Thompson	29	101.2	4	7	3.36	35

==== Relief pitchers ====
Note: G = Games pitched; W = Wins; L = Losses; SV = Saves; ERA = Earned run average; SO = Strikeouts

Player	G	W	L	SV	ERA	SO
Joe Beggs	38	6	5	8	2.13	24
Clyde Shoun	34	1	3	0	2.23	32
Jim Turner	3	0	0	0	10.80	0
Ewell Blackwell	2	0	0	0	6.00	1
Whitey Moore	1	0	0	0	0.00	0

== Farm system ==
Level	Team	League	Manager
AA	Syracuse Chiefs	International League	Jewel Ens
A1	Birmingham Barons	Southern Association	Johnny Riddle
B	Columbia Reds	Sally League	Cap Crossley
C	Ogden Reds	Pioneer League	Bill McCorry
D	Cordele Reds	Georgia–Florida League	Frank O'Rourke

LEAGUE CHAMPIONS: Syracuse
