= Buster Maynard =

American baseball player (1913-1977)

- Outfielder
- Born: March 25, 1913; Henderson, North Carolina, U.S.
- Died: September 7, 1977 (aged 64); Durham, North Carolina, U.S.
- Batted: Right Threw: Right

MLB debut
- September 17, 1940, for the New York Giants

Last MLB appearance
- April 26, 1946, for the New York Giants

MLB statistics
- Batting average: .221
- Home runs: 14
- Runs batted in: 66
- Stats at Baseball Reference

Teams
- New York Giants (1940, 1942–43, 1946)

James Walter "Buster" Maynard (March 25, 1913 – September 7, 1977) was an American professional baseball player whose 14-year career included 224 games in Major League Baseball for the New York Giants during all or portions of four seasons between 1940 and 1946. The outfielder and third baseman, a native of Henderson, North Carolina, threw and batted right-handed, stood 5 feet 11 inches (1.80 m) tall and weighed 170 pounds (77 kg). He was a United States Army veteran of World War II who spent all of the 1944 and 1945 seasons in military service.

== Baseball career ==
Maynard's career began in 1937 in the low minors. In 1940, at age 27, he had a stellar year for the Richmond Colts of the Class B Piedmont League, clubbing 30 home runs and hitting .337. His success earned Maynard a late-season call-up from the Colts' parent team, the New York Giants. His first taste of the majors lasted for seven games and was bookended by two notable games. In his MLB début, Maynard led off and played center field for the Giants in their game against the Chicago Cubs at the Polo Grounds. He singled in his first MLB at bat against the Cubs' Vern Olsen, then came around to score the Giants' first run of the game. After grounding out in his second at bat, Maynard came to the plate for a third time against Olsen in the fourth inning; this time, he slammed a triple and was thrown out at home plate for trying to stretch his hit into an inside-the-park home run. Then, in Maynard's final 1940 appearance, he collected four hits in four at bats, including another triple, and scored three runs against the Boston Bees in a 14–0 Giant rout.

Maynard batted .276 during that initial stint with the Giants, but he spent 1941 and the first month of 1942 with minor-league Jersey City. He was recalled to the majors in May 1942, and played in 210 total games for the Giants during the 1942 and 1943 seasons. However, he batted only .247 and .206 respectively, with 13 total home runs. Then, after the 1943 campaign ended, he entered the military. After the war, Maynard got a final, seven-game audition with the 1946 Giants as a pinch runner and backup outfielder. He was sent back to Jersey City and finished his pro career in the minor leagues in 1952 at age 39. As a big leaguer, he batted .221 with 136 career hits (14 doubles, five triples and 14 home runs). He died in Durham, North Carolina, at age 64 in 1977.

== Subject of Lasorda anecdote ==
Years after he left baseball, however, Maynard would be remembered in a story often told by Tommy Lasorda, the Baseball Hall of Fame manager of the Los Angeles Dodgers, to his players at spring training.

Lasorda recalled that, as a teenager in the early 1940s, he had attended his first major league game at Shibe Park in Philadelphia, a contest between the Phillies and Maynard's Giants. As the game ended, the young Lasorda and his friends gathered in the runway between the teams' dugouts and their clubhouses in search of autographs from the big-league players. When Lasorda asked a Giant player to sign his scorecard, he was shoved out of the way. Roger Angell, Hall of Fame baseball writer and former fiction editor of The New Yorker, described what happened next:

"'I couldn't believe it,' [Lasorda said.] 'Here was the first big-league player I'd ever seen up close — the first one I ever dared speak to — and what he did was shove me up against the wall ... I watched the guy as he went away toward the clubhouse and I noticed the number on his back — you know, like taking the number of a hit-and-run car. Later on, I looked at my program and got his name. It was Buster Maynard, who was an outfielder for the Giants then. I never forgot it.'"

By 1949, Lasorda was 21 and a left-handed pitcher in the Brooklyn Dodgers' minor-league system. One day, as he was on the mound for the Greenville Spinners in the Class A Sally League against the Augusta Tigers, he heard the public address announcer introduce the rival batter he was about to face: Buster Maynard, then a 36-year-old minor league veteran. Angell writes: "Lasorda was transfixed. 'I looked in,' he [said], 'and it was the same man!'" Lasorda proceeded to throw three brushback pitches at Maynard; after the third, Maynard charged the mound and a full-scale brawl nearly ensued. After the game, as Lasorda was getting into his street clothes in his team's clubhouse, there was a knock at the door. It was Maynard, who (according to Angell) wore a "peaceable but puzzled expression."

"'Listen, kid,' he said to Lasorda, 'did I ever meet you before?' 'Not exactly,' Tom said. 'Did I bat against you someplace, maybe?' 'Nope.' 'Well, why were you tryin' to take my head off out there?' Lasorda spread his hands wide. 'You didn't give me your autograph,' he said."

During his 20 years as manager of the Dodgers, Lasorda regularly told that story to his young players, advising them, "Always give an autograph when somebody asks you ... You can never tell. In baseball, anything can happen."
