= Harry Shuman =

American baseball player (1915–1996)

- Pitcher
- Born: March 5, 1915; Philadelphia, Pennsylvania, U.S.
- Died: October 25, 1996 (aged 81); Philadelphia, Pennsylvania, U.S.
- Batted: Right Threw: Right

MLB debut
- September 14, 1942, for the Pittsburgh Pirates

Last MLB appearance
- September 26, 1944, for the Philadelphia Phillies

MLB statistics
- Win–loss record: 0–0
- Earned run average: 4.44
- Strikeouts: 10
- Stats at Baseball Reference

Teams
- Pittsburgh Pirates (1942–1943); Philadelphia Phillies (1944)

Harry Shuman (March 5, 1915 – October 25, 1996) was an American Major League Baseball pitcher who played for the Pittsburgh Pirates (1942–43) and the Philadelphia Phillies (1944). The right-hander stood 6 ft 2 in (1.88 m) and weighed 195 lb (88 kg).

He was born in Philadelphia, Pennsylvania, and was Jewish. He attended Central High School and Temple University in Philadelphia.

== Baseball career ==
Shuman is one of many ballplayers who only appeared in the major leagues during World War II. He made his major league debut on September 14, 1942, in a road game against the New York Giants at the Polo Grounds. He pitched two scoreless innings of relief in the 6–1 loss.

Shuman's career totals include 30 games pitched, all in relief, a 0–0 record with 19 games finished, 25 earned runs allowed in 50 2/3 innings, and an ERA of 4.44.

== Late life ==
Shuman worked for the Philadelphia Democratic Committee, greeting visitors to the committee's offices, toward the end of his life.

Shuman died in his hometown of Philadelphia at the age of 81, and was buried in Haym Salomon Memorial Park in Frazer, Pennsylvania.
