= Chet Kehn =

American baseball player (1921–1984)

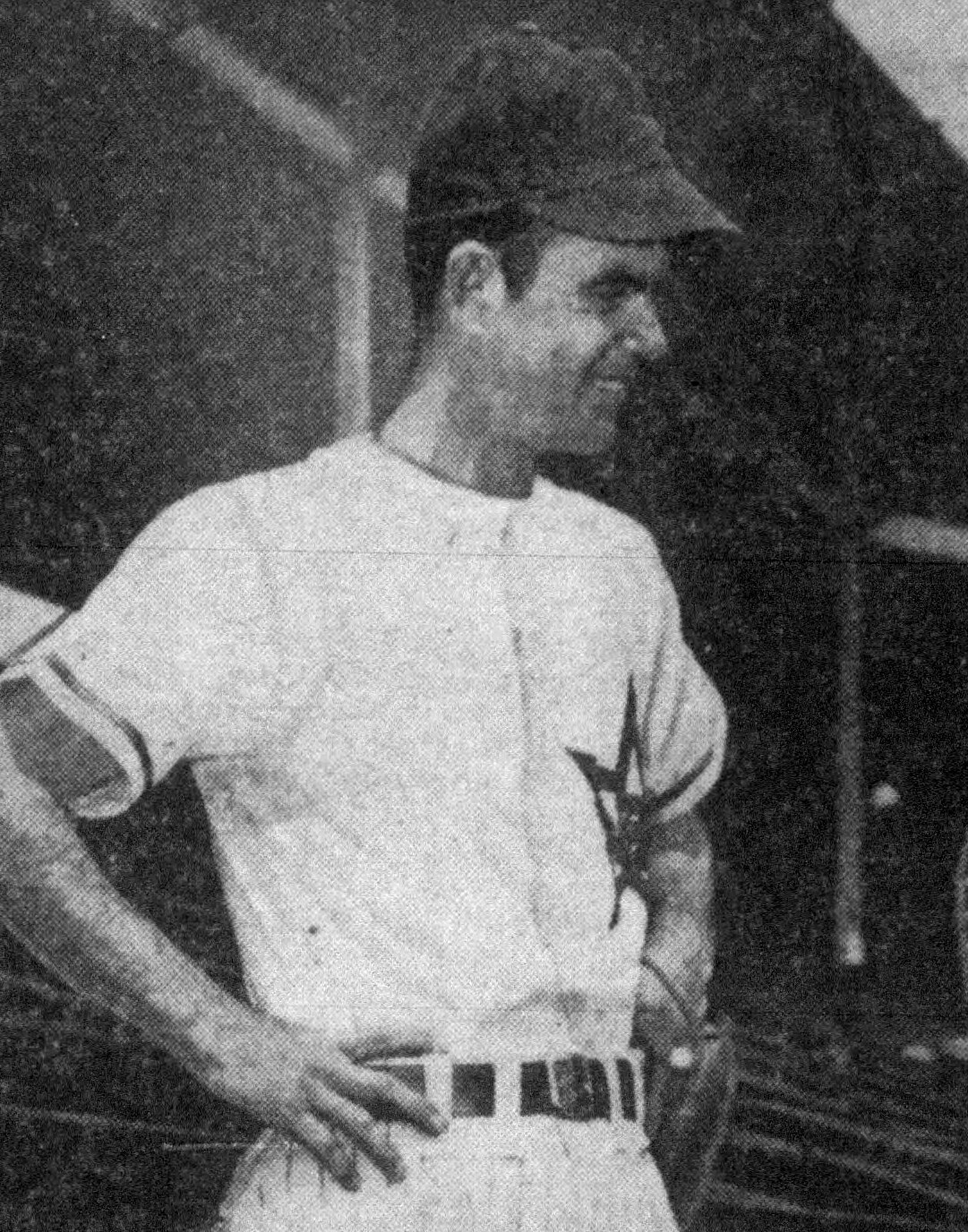
- Kehn, circa 1950
- Pitcher
- Born: October 30, 1921; San Diego, California, U.S.
- Died: April 5, 1984 (aged 62); San Diego, California, U.S.
- Batted: Right Threw: Right

MLB debut
- April 30, 1942, for the Brooklyn Dodgers

Last MLB appearance
- May 12, 1942, for the Brooklyn Dodgers

MLB statistics
- Win–loss record: 0–0
- Earned run average: 7.04
- Strikeouts: 3
- Stats at Baseball Reference

Teams
- Brooklyn Dodgers (1942)

Chester Lawrence Kehn (October 30, 1921 – April 5, 1984) was an American Major League Baseball pitcher who played for the Brooklyn Dodgers in 1942. At 20 years of age, he was the fourth-youngest player to appear in a National League game that season.

Kehn is one of many ballplayers who only appeared in the major leagues during World War II. He made his major league debut on April 30, 1942, as a starting pitcher against the Cincinnati Reds at Crosley Field. The Dodgers won 11–8, but Kehn was not the winning pitcher. He made only two more appearances, both in relief, before his big league career was over due to a shoulder separation. In three games he was 0–0 with two games finished, and allowed six earned runs in 7.2 innings pitched for a final ERA of 7.04.

Kehn proved to be a better hitter and fielder than he was as a pitcher, at least at the major league level. At the plate he was 2-for-2 (1.000) with one RBI and one run scored, and in the field he handled four chances without an error (1.000).

Kehn retired from baseball in 1950 after several years in Santa Barbara as their manager; later,.he had a very successful career in retail management.

Kehn died in his hometown of San Diego, California, at the age of 62.
