= Chico Hernández =

Cuban baseball player (1916–1986)

- Catcher
- Born: January 3, 1916; Havana, Cuba
- Died: January 3, 1986 (aged 70); Havana, Cuba
- Batted: Right Threw: Right

MLB debut
- April 16, 1942, for the Chicago Cubs

Last MLB appearance
- July 28, 1943, for the Chicago Cubs

MLB statistics
- Batting average: .250
- Home runs: 0
- Runs batted in: 16
- Stats at Baseball Reference

Teams
- Chicago Cubs (1942–43)

Salvador José "Chico" Hernández Ramos (January 3, 1916 – January 3, 1986) was a Cuban Major League Baseball catcher. He played two seasons in the majors, 1942 and 1943, for the Chicago Cubs.

Along with Hi Bithorn, Chico became the third latino battery mates in ML history . Preceded by Tuero/Gonzalez (Cards) in 1918, and Luque/Cueto (Reds), also in 1918 . Retrosheet / Games / Season 1918 .
