= Emil Kush =

American baseball player (1916–1969)

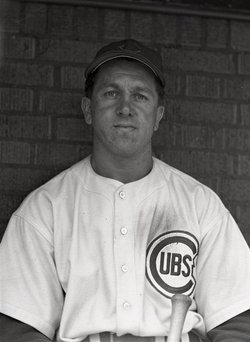
- Pitcher
- Born: November 4, 1916; Chicago, Illinois, U.S.
- Died: November 26, 1969 (aged 53); River Grove, Illinois, U.S.
- Batted: Right Threw: Right

MLB debut
- September 21, 1941, for the Chicago Cubs

Last MLB appearance
- August 14, 1949, for the Chicago Cubs

MLB statistics
- Win–loss record: 21–12
- Earned run average: 3.48
- Strikeouts: 150
- Stats at Baseball Reference

Teams
- Chicago Cubs (1941–1942, 1946–1949)

Emil Benedict Kush (November 4, 1916 – November 26, 1969) was an American professional baseball player, a right-handed pitcher who worked in 150 Major League games for the Chicago Cubs for six seasons (1941–42; 1946–49). The native of Chicago, Illinois, stood 5 feet 11 inches (1.80 m) tall and weighed 185 pounds (84 kg). He missed three seasons (1943–45) while serving in the United States Navy during World War II.

Kush enjoyed two banner back-to-back seasons in 1946 and 1947, appearing in 87 games and 220 2/3 innings pitched, winning 17 of a total of 22 decisions, collecting both of his career complete games and seven of his 12 saves. He posted a cumulative earned run average of 3.18 during those two years.

All told, Kush allowed 324 hits and 158 bases on balls in 346 1/3 MLB innings, with 150 strikeouts.

Kush died via carbon monoxide poisoning on November 26, 1969.
