= Frank Crespi =

American baseball player (1918–1990)

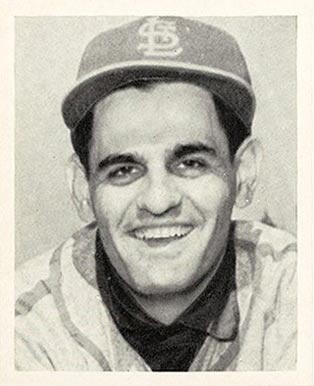
- Second baseman
- Born: February 16, 1918; St. Louis, Missouri, U.S.
- Died: March 1, 1990 (aged 72); Florissant, Missouri, U.S.
- Batted: Right Threw: Right

MLB debut
- September 14, 1938, for the St. Louis Cardinals

Last MLB appearance
- September 27, 1942, for the St. Louis Cardinals

MLB statistics
- Batting average: .263
- Home runs: 4
- Runs batted in: 88
- Stats at Baseball Reference

Teams
- St. Louis Cardinals (1938–1942)

Career highlights and awards
- World Series champion (1942)

Frank Angelo Joseph "Creepy" Crespi (February 16, 1918 – March 1, 1990) was an American Major League Baseball player who played infield from 1938-1942 for the St. Louis Cardinals. He made his major league debut on September 14, 1938 playing second base for the Cardinals.

In 1951, longtime Cardinals star shortstop Marty Marion praised Crespi as the best defensive second baseman he'd ever played with. "For one year—1941—Crespi was the best second baseman I ever saw. He did everything, and sensationally."

Frank Crespi's nickname, 'Creepy', is widely considered one of the more colorful and unusual names in baseball history. In a 1976 radio interview with future Hall of Fame broadcaster Jack Buck, Crespi told Buck people still called him by his nickname. Buck followed up with, "Why do they call you that?" Crespi replied, "Well, it's an involved thing...I used to hear a lot of different stories. But I think the best one is [from] some sportswriter. He said the way I creep up on a ball, because I run low to the ground after a ground ball."

Although Crespi lost the starting second base job for the Cardinals in 1942 to Jimmy Brown, he still appeared in 93 games that season. The Cardinals won the National League pennant and played the New York Yankees in the 1942 World Series. Crespi played in one game in the World Series, serving as a pinch runner in game 1, and scoring a run. The Cardinals won the series, four games to one.

== World War II ==
Crespi was reclassified as a 1-A draftee in early February 1943 while working at the Emerson Electric plant in St. Louis. He was ordered to report to Jefferson Barracks Military Post for the United States Army in Lemay, Missouri on February 20. Though he qualified for a deferment as the sole supporter of his elderly mother, he refused, claiming, "I don't think I'm too good to fight for the things I've always enjoyed."

In 1943, while playing for Fort Riley's baseball team at Wichita, Kansas, Crespi broke his leg. The field was muddy from a recent rainstorm and with a baserunner on, he took a throw from third base, jammed his foot on first base and in the way of the oncoming hitter. The slide from the hitter crashed into his ankle and broke his leg. Crespi was hospitalized, but the brace attached by screws worked its way into the skin and caused an infection on the leg. Because of the infection, numerous skin graft and bone graft operations were done on the leg. After the surgeries, they put his leg in a cast and in a wheelchair. A friend of Crespi's pushed the player's wheelchair in a playful fashion while in the hospital recovering. Crespi tried to grab one wheel to avoid crashing into a wall, resulting in the wheelchair spinning and turning over. In the process, he broke his injured leg again. While in the hospital, a nurse negligently kept wrapping his ankle up in bandages with boric acid, causing permanent damage to his ankle.

According to former teammate and shortstop Marty Marion in April 1951, a total of 23 operations were performed on Crespi's leg.

== After the war ==
In an attempt to qualify for the major league pension plan, Crespi applied various times as coach. Unable to obtain the position, he became a budget analyst for McDonnell Douglas, where he worked for 20 years.

After his retirement from McDonnell Douglas on March 17, 1983, Crespi earned a pension of $350 per month and his money from the Social Security Administration. A year prior, he had written to Marvin Miller of the Major League Baseball Players Association (MLBPA) about his situation with his baseball pension. Miller investigated the case for Crespi, finding out that he had been placed on the disabled list on September 1946, when the first pension plan had come into effect. By being placed on the disabled list despite not playing since 1942, he had become eligible for a pension. The presumption was that because he was not on a roster in September 1946, he would not be eligible and had not gotten any pension checks to that point. With Miller's help, Crespi received his first pension check in May 1983 for $900 a month. Crespi announced that he would visit Italy in the summer of 1983 then begin helping the United Service Organizations (USO).

A lifelong bachelor, Crespi lived his mother, Theresa, until her death of a heart attack on December 29, 1986. Frank Crespi suffered a heart attack himself on February 14, 1990. He died on March 1 at Christian Northwest Hospital in Florissant, Missouri.

== Bibliography ==
- Robbins, Mike (2004). Ninety Feet from Fame: Close Calls with Baseball Immortality. New York City, New York: Carroll & Graf Publishers. ISBN 9780786713356.
