= Bill Lohrman =

American baseball player (1913–1999)

- Pitcher
- Born: May 22, 1913; Brooklyn, New York, U.S.
- Died: September 13, 1999 (aged 86); Poughkeepsie, New York, U.S.
- Batted: Right Threw: Right

MLB debut
- June 19, 1934, for the Philadelphia Phillies

Last MLB appearance
- June 10, 1944, for the Cincinnati Reds

MLB statistics
- Win–loss record: 60–59
- Earned run average: 3.69
- Strikeouts: 330
- Stats at Baseball Reference

Teams
- Philadelphia Phillies (1934); New York Giants (1937–1941); St. Louis Cardinals (1942); New York Giants (1942–1943); Brooklyn Dodgers (1943–1944); Cincinnati Reds (1944)

William Leroy Lohrman (May 22, 1913 – September 13, 1999) was an American professional baseball pitcher. He played in Major League Baseball (MLB) for five different National League teams.

== Career ==
Lohrman pitched in 198 games from 1934 to 1944. He played for the New York Giants, Brooklyn Dodgers, St. Louis Cardinals, Philadelphia Phillies, and Cincinnati Reds.

Following the 1941 season, Lohrman, along with Ken O'Dea, Johnny McCarthy and $50,000, were traded to the St. Louis Cardinals for Johnny Mize.

Lohrman was born and raised in Brooklyn, New York and went to live in New Paltz, New York, following his baseball career.
