= Alf Anderson =

American baseball player (1914–1985)

- Shortstop
- Born: January 28, 1914; Gainesville, Georgia, U.S.
- Died: June 23, 1985 (aged 71); Albany, Georgia, U.S.
- Batted: Right Threw: Right

MLB debut
- April 20, 1941, for the Pittsburgh Pirates

Last MLB appearance
- April 21, 1946, for the Pittsburgh Pirates

MLB statistics
- Batting average: .238
- Home runs: 1
- Runs batted in: 17
- Stats at Baseball Reference

Teams
- Pittsburgh Pirates (1941–1942, 1946)

Alfred Walton Anderson (January 28, 1914 – June 23, 1985) was an American professional baseball shortstop who appeared in 146 Major League Baseball games for the Pittsburgh Pirates during the 1941, 1942 and 1946 seasons. Anderson was born in Gainesville, Georgia; he threw and batted right-handed, and was listed as 5 feet 11 inches (1.80 m) tall and 165 pounds (75 kg).

His professional career began in the low minor leagues in 1938, but Anderson would require only three years of seasoning before making the Pirates at age 27 in 1941. With future Baseball Hall of Fame shortstop Arky Vaughan starting only 90 of the club's 156 official games, Anderson was penciled into the Bucs' starting lineup 56 times; overall, he batted .215 with 48 hits. The following year, with Vaughan traded to the Brooklyn Dodgers, Anderson backed up Pete Coscarart, starting 40 games and improving his average to .271, but he also spent part of the summer in the minors with the top-level Minneapolis Millers. From 1944 to 1945 Anderson served in the United States Navy during World War II. He returned to the Pirates for two pinch hitting appearances in April 1946, then was sent to the minor-league Hollywood Stars. He left baseball after that season.

In his 146 MLB games played, he batted .238 lifetime; his 93 hits included 11 doubles, three triples, and one home run, struck September 14, 1941, at Forbes Field against Lefty Hoerst of the Philadelphia Phillies. He was credited with 17 career runs batted in and six stolen bases.

Anderson died in Albany, Georgia, aged 71.
