= Frankie Gustine =

American baseball player (1920–1991)

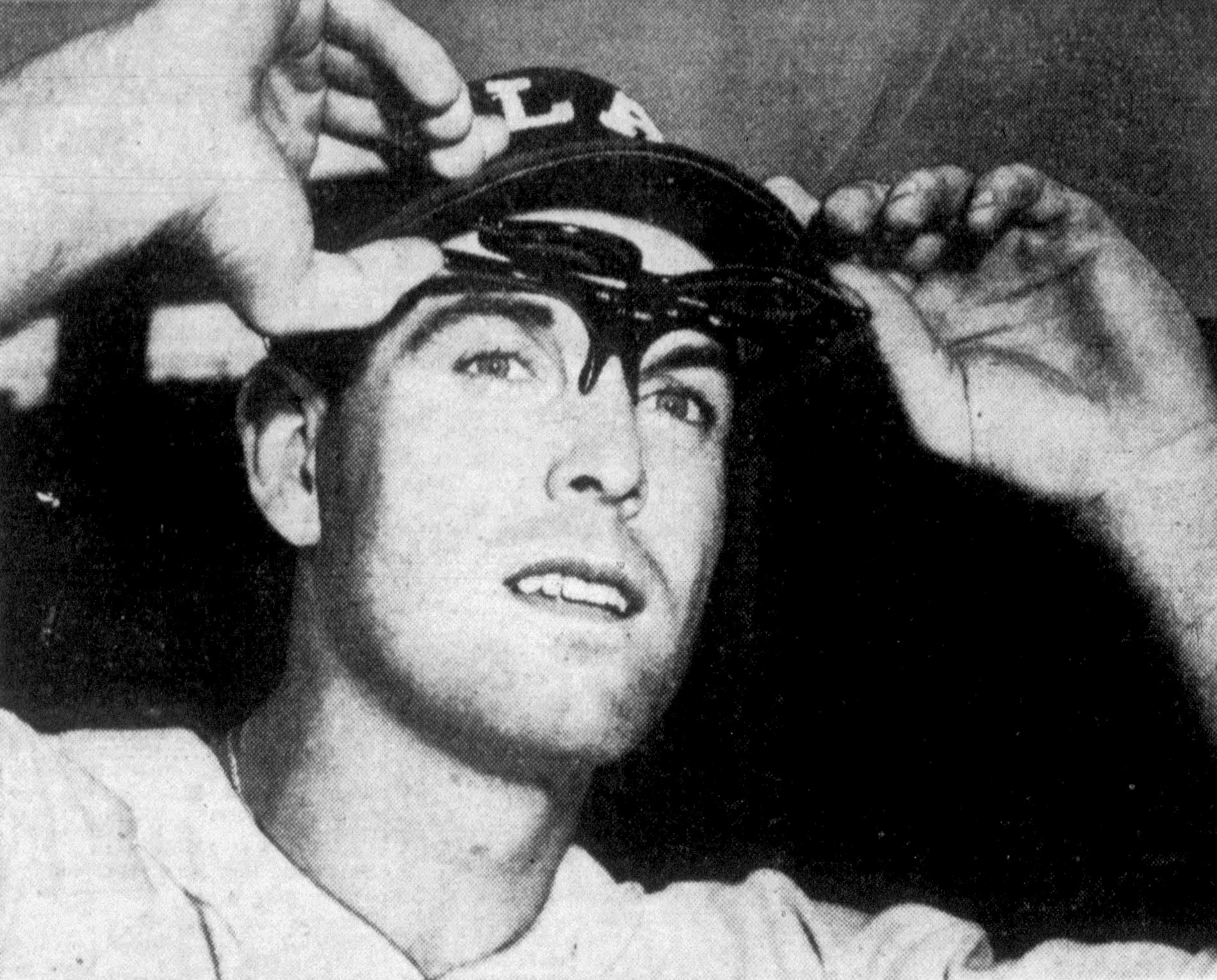
- Gustine, circa 1949
- Infielder
- Born: February 20, 1920; Hoopeston, Illinois, U.S.
- Died: April 1, 1991 (aged 71); Davenport, Iowa, U.S.
- Batted: Right Threw: Right

MLB debut
- September 13, 1939, for the Pittsburgh Pirates

Last MLB appearance
- May 17, 1950, for the St. Louis Browns

MLB statistics
- Batting average: .265
- Home runs: 38
- Runs batted in: 480
- Stats at Baseball Reference

Teams
- Pittsburgh Pirates (1939–1948); Chicago Cubs (1949); St. Louis Browns (1950)

Career highlights and awards
- 3× All-Star (1946–1948)

Frank William Gustine (February 20, 1920 – April 1, 1991) was an American Major League Baseball player who appeared in three All-Star Games during his 12-season (1939–50) MLB career. He spent the bulk of his tenure (1,176 games played) with the Pittsburgh Pirates, though he also played a season for the Chicago Cubs and played the last nine games of his career with the 1950 St. Louis Browns. He also was a coach for the latter two months of that season for the Pirates.

The native of Hoopeston, Illinois, threw and batted right-handed. He stood 6 feet (1.8 m) tall and weighed 175 pounds (79 kg).

Gustine played all positions in the infield, spending most of his time at first and second base. He was selected to the All-Star game in 1946, 1947 and 1948. In 1,261 MLB games played, Gustine collected 1,214 hits, including 222 doubles and 47 triples. His best season was 1947, when he reached career highs in batting average (.297), hits (183), runs scored (102), and runs batted in (67).

His roommate during his career with the Pirates was Hall of Famer Ralph Kiner.

Gustine also was a renowned college baseball coach. He started the Point Park College baseball program in 1968 and laid the foundation for one of the most successful in the National Association of Intercollegiate Athletics (NAIA).

Gustine coached the Pioneers from 1968 to 1974 and compiled a 103–46 record. He led Point Park to the postseason four times, including NAIA District 18 championships in 1973 and 1974. His 1974 squad finished fourth in the NAIA World Series—the second highest finish ever for a Pioneer baseball team.

Gustine was elected to the Point Park athletics Hall Of Fame in 2000.

== Other sports ==
During baseball off-seasons, Gustine coached the basketball team at Waynesburg College.

Gustine also coached the Point Park College men’s basketball team for several seasons in the mid 1960s when the school was still a junior college.

== Post-baseball career ==
In 1954, Gustine and Lee Handley began a daily 15-minute sports program on KDKA radio in Pittsburgh, Pennsylvania. They had previously worked together on both radio and TV programs. Gustine also had a restaurant near Forbes Field in Pittsburgh.
