= Maurice Van Robays =

American baseball player (1914–1965)

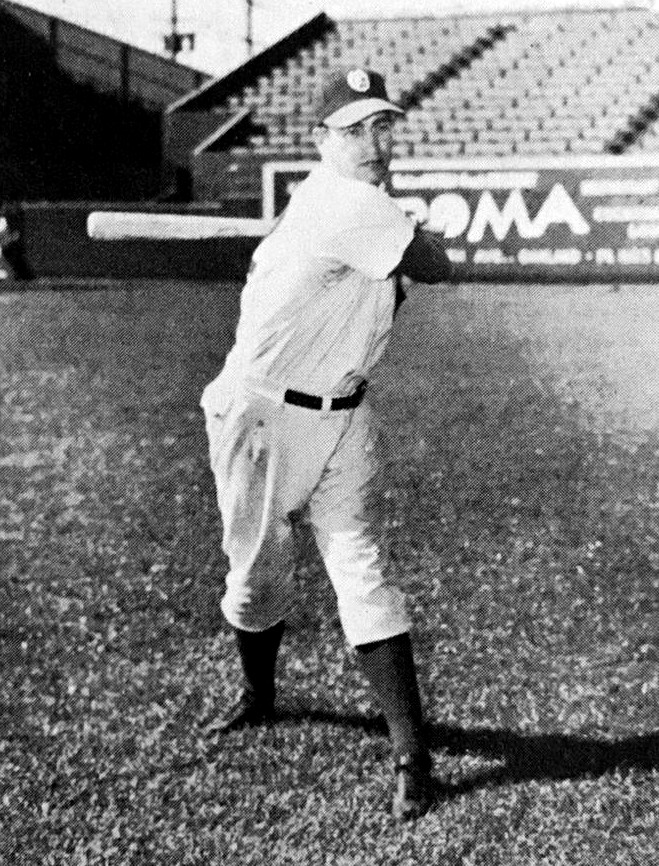
- Van Robays in 1948
- Left fielder
- Born: November 15, 1914; Detroit, Michigan, U.S.
- Died: March 1, 1965 (aged 50); Detroit, Michigan, U.S.
- Batted: Right Threw: Right

MLB debut
- September 7, 1939, for the Pittsburgh Pirates

Last MLB appearance
- September 22, 1946, for the Pittsburgh Pirates

MLB statistics
- Batting average: .267
- Home runs: 20
- Runs batted in: 303
- Stats at Baseball Reference

Teams
- Pittsburgh Pirates (1939–1943, 1946)

Maurice Rene Van Robays (November 15, 1914 – March 1, 1965), nicknamed "Bomber," was an American professional baseball outfielder who played six seasons in Major League Baseball (MLB) with the Pittsburgh Pirates between 1939 and 1946. Listed at 6 feet 0 inches (1.83 m) tall and 190 pounds (86 kg), he batted and threw right-handed.

== Biography ==
Originally signed by his hometown Detroit Tigers, Van Robays first played professionally in 1934 with the minor league Grand Rapids Tigers and Charleroi Tigers. He missed the 1935 season due to influenza and pneumonia, only returning to baseball late in the 1936 season with a semi-professional team in Detroit.

Van Robays returned to the minor leagues in 1937, helping the Ogdensburg Colts win the Canadian–American League title. He then moved to the Pittsburgh Pirates farm system in 1938. After batting .320 in 1939 with the Montreal Royals of the International League, Van Robays made his major league debut on September 7 of that year. He had three hits in his debut, including a double, and two RBI in a narrow victory. As of 2023, his 1.022 win probability added is a record for a debutant. Appearing in 27 games with the Pirates in 1939, primarily as a left fielder, he batted .314 with two home runs and 16 RBI.

In 1940, Van Robays appeared in a career-high 145 major league games, batting .273 with 11 home runs and 116 RBIs. His 116 RBIs were third-most in the National League. After the season, Van Robays drew eight points and finished 24th in league MVP voting, with a .316 on-base percentage and .402 slugging percentage. He played a decreasing number of games with Pittsburgh each of the next three seasons, with a corresponding decline in RBIs. Eyesight difficulties led to Van Robays starting to wear glasses in 1942.

Van Robays missed the 1944 and 1945 seasons while serving in the United States Army with the 1st Infantry Division in Europe.

In 1946, Van Robays played 59 games for the Pirates, his final major league appearances, batting .212 with one home run and 12 RBIs. Overall during parts of six major league seasons with Pittsburgh, he batted .267 with 20 home runs and 303 RBIs. Defensively, he played 470 games in the outfield (402 in left field), three games at first base, and one game at third base; he had a .966 fielding average.

Van Robays completed his professional career by spending four seasons with the Oakland Oaks of the Pacific Coast League, 1947 to 1950; the team was league champions in 1948. He appeared in a total of 822 minor league games in parts of nine seasons, batting .315 with at least 94 home runs and 199 RBIs, as minor league records of the era are incomplete.

Van Robays is credited with naming the "eephus pitch", developed by teammate Rip Sewell. In a 1942 exhibition game, Sewell threw a high, arching lob to the plate, and when the pitch finally arrived, Dick Wakefield swung and missed. After the game, manager Frankie Frisch asked Sewell what he called the pitch, and Van Robays replied "that's an eephus pitch." When Sewell asked him what an eephus was, Van Robays said, "Eephus ain't nuthin'." From then on, Sewell called it the eephus pitch.

Van Robays died of pneumonia in March 1965, aged 50, and was buried in Detroit's Mount Olivet Cemetery.
