= Jimmy Wasdell =

American baseball player (1914–1983)

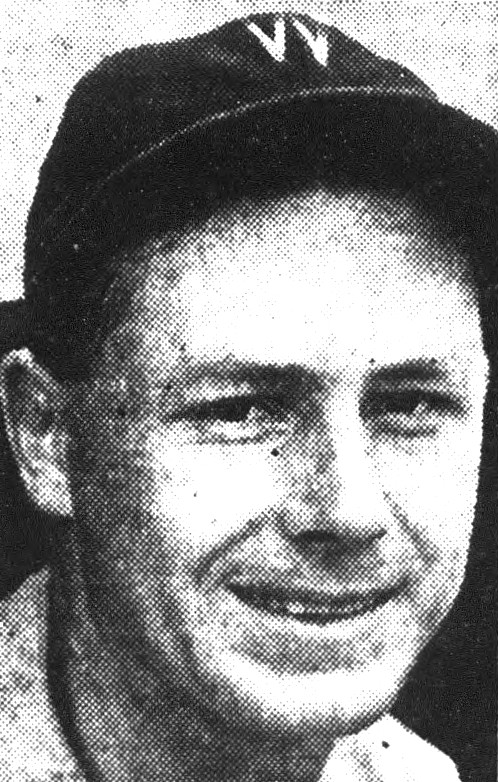
- Wasdell, circa 1938
- Outfielder / First baseman
- Born: May 15, 1914; Cleveland, Ohio, U.S.
- Died: August 6, 1983 (aged 69); New Port Richey, Florida, U.S.
- Batted: Left Threw: Left

MLB debut
- September 3, 1937, for the Washington Senators

Last MLB appearance
- April 18, 1947, for the Cleveland Indians

MLB statistics
- Batting average: .273
- Home runs: 29
- Runs batted in: 341
- Stats at Baseball Reference

Teams
- Washington Senators (1937–1940); Brooklyn Dodgers (1940–1941); Pittsburgh Pirates (1942–1943); Philadelphia Phillies (1943–1946); Cleveland Indians (1946–1947)

James Charles Wasdell (May 15, 1914 – August 6, 1983) was an American professional baseball outfielder and first baseman. He played in Major League Baseball (MLB) for all or portions of 11 seasons between 1937 and 1947 for the Washington Senators, Brooklyn Dodgers, Pittsburgh Pirates, Philadelphia Phillies and Cleveland Indians. The Cleveland native threw and batted left-handed and was listed as 5 feet 11 inches (1.80 m) tall and 185 pounds (84 kg).

Wasdell helped the Dodgers win the 1941 National League pennant. Appearing in 94 games, including 46 as a starting outfielder, Wasdell batted .298 in 287 plate appearances, collecting 79 hits. In the World Series, he appeared in three games, with five at bats; he made one hit, batting for Joe Medwick, Wasdell connected for a double against pitcher Atley Donald of the New York Yankees in the fourth inning of Game 5, the Series' final contest. His flyout out to Joe Dimaggio ended the 1941 World Series, the Yankees had defeated the Dodgers, four games to one.

In 11 MLB seasons, Wasdell played in 888 games and had 2,866 at bats, 339 runs, 782 hits, 109 doubles, 34 triples, 29 home runs, 341 runs batted in, 29 stolen bases, 243 walks, .273 batting average, .332 on-base percentage, .365 slugging percentage, 1,046 total bases and 39 sacrifice hits. Defensively, he recorded a .981 fielding percentage playing primarily at first base and at all three outfield positions. Including minor league service, Wasdell played for 15 seasons (1935–1950) in Organized Baseball. Wasdell's best season was 1945 when he batted an even .300 with 150 hits in 500 at bats for the Philadelphia Phillies.

After his MLB career he managed in the minor leagues and for many years he owned a bar, 'Wasdell's Dugout', in Willoughby, Ohio, an eastside suburb of Cleveland.

He died in New Port Richey, Florida at the age of 69.
