= Vern Olsen =

American baseball player (1918–1989)

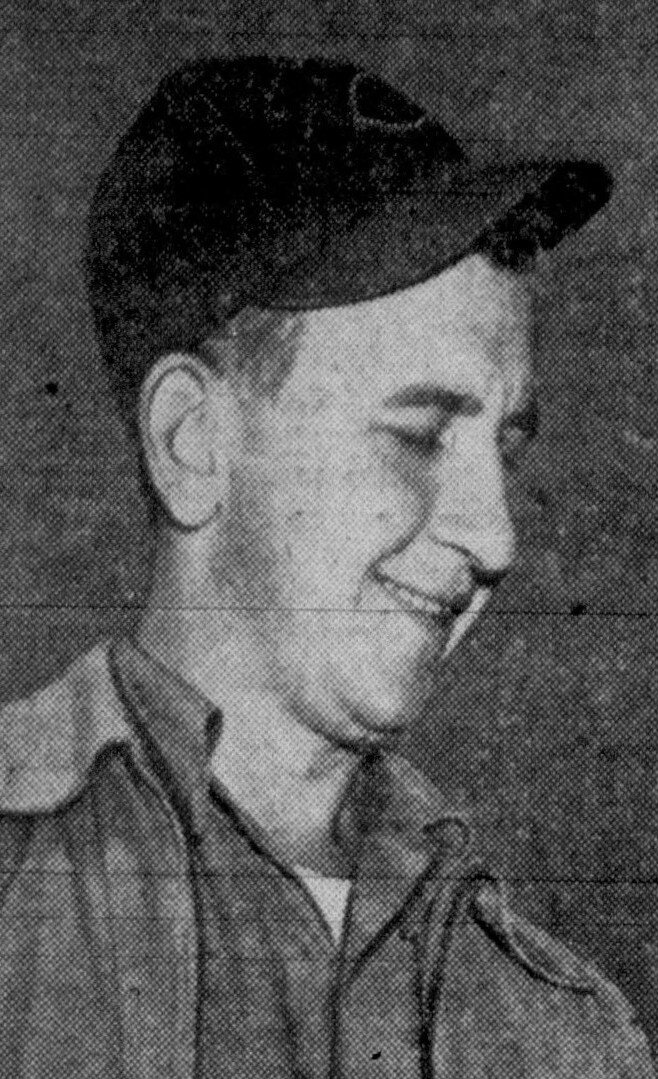
- Olsen, circa 1942
- Pitcher
- Born: March 16, 1918; Hillsboro, Oregon, U.S.
- Died: July 13, 1989 (aged 71); Maywood, Illinois, U.S.
- Batted: Right Threw: Left

MLB debut
- September 8, 1939, for the Chicago Cubs

Last MLB appearance
- September 13, 1946, for the Chicago Cubs

MLB statistics
- Win–loss record: 30–26
- Earned run average: 3.40
- Strikeouts: 201
- Stats at Baseball Reference

Teams
- Chicago Cubs (1939–1942; 1946)

Vern Jarl Olsen (March 16, 1918 – July 13, 1989) was an American professional baseball player, a left-handed pitcher who appeared in 112 Major League games for the Chicago Cubs (1939–42; 1946). The native of Hillsboro, Oregon, stood 6 feet (1.83 m) tall and weighed 175 pounds (79 kg). He served in the United States Navy in the Pacific Theater of Operations during World War II and missed three full seasons at the peak of his career.

Olsen had considerable success before the war. During his three seasons in minor league baseball (1937–39), he won 23, 19 and 18 games (losing a total of only 30 contests) before his recall to the Cubs in September 1939. After four scoreless relief appearances in the closing days of the 1939 season, Olsen then made the Cubs' 1940 roster and, after more success as a reliever, began taking a regular turn in the Chicago starting rotation in July 1940. On August 22, he threw a complete-game, two-hit shutout against the Brooklyn Dodgers, contributing two hits to the winning cause himself as the Cubs won, 5–0, at Wrigley Field. He would throw three other shutouts, finishing third in the National League in that category in 1940, post a 13–9 record, and finish fifth in the league in earned run average (2.97), with nine total complete games.

In 1941, Olsen won ten of 18 decisions in 37 games pitched and 23 starting assignments, with ten more complete games and a 3.15 earned run average. His performance declined somewhat in 1942, as he posted a losing record and his ERA climbed to 4.49. He then entered military service, returning for the 1946 season. But he was plagued by a sore arm and was able to appear in only seven more professional games, five with the 1946 Cubs and two more in the minors in 1947. He died in Maywood, Illinois, at the age of 71.

During his Major League career, Olsen gave up 547 hits and 192 bases on balls in 516 innings pitched, with 201 strikeouts, 23 complete games, seven shutouts and two saves. Sixty of his 112 games pitched came as a starter.

Olsen was a better than average hitting pitcher in his brief major league career, posting a .231 batting average (39-for-169) with 16 runs, 1 home run and 14 RBI. Defensively, he was above average, recording a .988 fielding percentage, committing only 2 errors in 169 total chances.
