= Hank Gornicki =

American baseball player (1911–1996)

- Pitcher
- Born: January 14, 1911; Niagara Falls, New York, U.S.
- Died: February 16, 1996 (aged 85); Riviera Beach, Florida, U.S.
- Batted: Right Threw: Right

MLB debut
- April 17, 1941, for the St. Louis Cardinals

Last MLB appearance
- September 24, 1946, for the Pittsburgh Pirates

MLB statistics
- Win–loss record: 15–19
- Earned run average: 3.38
- Strikeouts: 123
- Stats at Baseball Reference

Teams
- St. Louis Cardinals (1941); Chicago Cubs (1941); Pittsburgh Pirates (1942–1943, 1946)

Henry Frank Gornicki (January 14, 1911 – February 16, 1996) was an American Major League Baseball pitcher. He played all or part of four seasons in the Majors, 1941 to 1943 and 1946, for the St. Louis Cardinals, Chicago Cubs, and Pittsburgh Pirates.

From 1944 to 1945, Gornicki served in the military during World War II.
