= Clyde Shoun =

American baseball player (1912–1968)

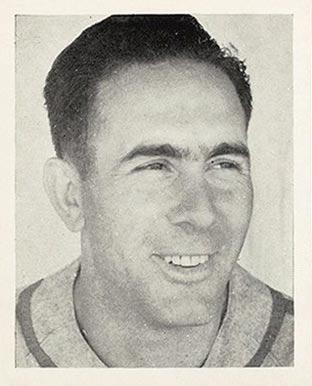
- Pitcher
- Born: March 20, 1912; Mountain City, Tennessee, U.S.
- Died: March 20, 1968 (aged 56); Johnson City, Tennessee, U.S.
- Batted: Left Threw: Left

MLB debut
- August 7, 1935, for the Chicago Cubs

Last MLB appearance
- July 19, 1949, for the Chicago White Sox

MLB statistics
- Win–loss record: 73–59
- Earned run average: 3.91
- Strikeouts: 483
- Stats at Baseball Reference

Teams
- Chicago Cubs (1935–1937); St. Louis Cardinals (1938–1942); Cincinnati Reds (1942–1944, 1946–1947); Boston Braves (1947–1949); Chicago White Sox (1949)

Career highlights and awards
- Pitched a no-hitter on May 15, 1944

Clyde Mitchell Shoun (March 20, 1912 – March 20, 1968) was an American professional baseball player. A left-handed pitcher, he was born in Mountain City, Tennessee, and known as "Hardrock", due to his fastball. He was the younger brother of professional basketball player Slim Shoun.

Shoun was 23 years old, when he broke into the big leagues on August 7, 1935, with the Chicago Cubs. He played for the Cubs, Cincinnati Reds, St. Louis Cardinals, Boston Braves, and Chicago White Sox.

Shoun led the major leagues in games pitched with 54 in 1940, when he was a member of the Cardinals.

While with the Reds, Shoun no-hit the Boston Braves 1–0 on May 15, 1944. The lone baserunner came on a walk to his mound opponent, Jim Tobin, himself a no-hit pitcher just 18 days earlier on April 27, and well known for being a good-hitting pitcher.

Shoun missed the 1945 professional baseball season due to his service in the Navy during World War II. However, he continued to play baseball during the year while in the service.

Shoun died on his 56th birthday in the veterans center in Johnson City, Tennessee. His funeral was held in Mountain City on March 23.

== See also ==
- List of Major League Baseball annual saves leaders
- List of Major League Baseball no-hitters

Achievements
Preceded by Jim Tobin	No-hitter pitcher May 15, 1944	Succeeded by Dick Fowler
