= Chapman (surname) =

Origin
- Meaning: Businessman or trader

Chapman is an English surname derived from the Old English occupational name céapmann "marketman, monger, merchant", from the verb céapan, cypan "to buy or sell" and the noun form ceap "barter, business, purchase." Alternate spellings include Caepmon, Cepeman, Chepmon, Cypman(n), and Shapman. (By 1600, the occupational name chapman had come to be applied to an itinerant dealer in particular, but it remained in use for both "customer, buyer" and "merchant" in the 17th and 18th centuries. Modern chiefly British slang chap “man" arose from the use of the abbreviated word to mean a customer, one with whom to bargain.)

The Oxford English Dictionary (OED) supplies four meanings for chapman, all of which pertain to buying and selling: 1) A man whose business was buying and selling; 2) an itinerant dealer who travels, also known as a hawker or peddler; 3) an agent in a commercial transaction; 4) a purchaser or customer. (N.B. A “petty chapman” was a retail dealer.) The OED includes a citation of an English ordinance or decree that dates from 1553, during the reign of Edward VI: "No Tinker, Peddler, or petit Chapman shall wander about from the Towne but such as shall be licensed by two Justices of Peace." According to a list of colonial occupations, a chapman is a peddler or dealer of goods, usually itinerant, going from village to village. The related word chapbook is a later coinage from the 19th century which appears to refer to the fact that chapbooks were very cheaply made. From Old English ceap is also derived cheap "inexpensive", a shortening of good ceap "good buy", and Cheapside "market place", a street in London that both historically and in modern times has been the financial centre of the city.

Both the compound "chapman" and its first element chap- have cognates in all the major Germanic languages. From the prehistoric West Germanic compound *kaup- are derived cognates Old Saxon cop, Old Frisian kap "trade, purchase", Middle Dutch coop, modern Dutch kopen "to buy", koop "trade, market, bargain" and goedkoop "inexpensive". These are akin to Old High German choufman, German Kaufmann, a common modern German surname; and North Germanic forms leading to Old Norse kaup "bargain, pay", modern Swedish köpa "buy", and modern Danish kjøb "purchase, bargain" and Copenhagen (originally Køpmannæhafn "merchants' harbor, buyer's haven"). The common ancestor is Proto-Germanic *kaupoz-, which was probably an ancient Germanic borrowing of Latin caupo, caupon- "petty tradesman, huckster", of unknown ulterior etymology. From the German the word was borrowed into the Slavic languages (Old Slavic koupiti, modern Russian купить, etc.), the Baltic languages (Old Prussian kaupiskan "trade, commerce", Lithuanian kὑpczus “merchant”) and Finnish kaupata "to sell cheaply". In the Romance languages, however, the word has not survived.

Notable people with the surname or nickname Chapman include:

== A ==
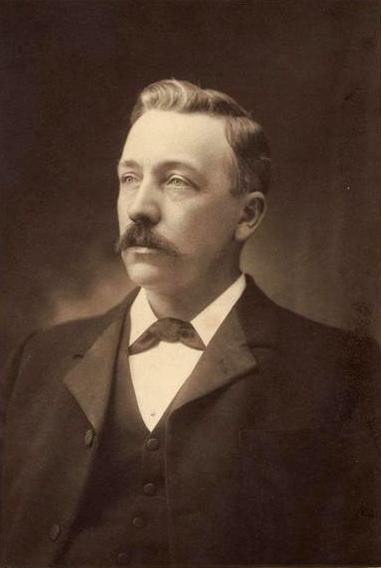
Austin Chapman, Australian Protectionist Party politician

- Abel Chapman (1851–1929), British born hunter-naturalist
- Adam Chapman (born 1989), Northern Irish footballer
- Albert Chapman (1872–1945), Australian politician
- Alfred Chapman (1829–1915), American real estate attorney, a founders of Orange, California
- Alger Chapman (1904–1983), American attorney, businessman and New York State official
- Alger Chapman Jr. (1931–2013), American chief executive
- Allan Chapman (historian) (1946–2026), British historian of science
- Allan Chapman (politician) (1897–1966), Scottish Unionist Member of Parliament 1935–1945
- Allen Chapman (born 1974), American soccer referee
- Allen Chapman (American football) (born 1991), American football player
- Alvah Chapman Jr. (1921–2008), American newspaper publisher
- Alvan Wentworth Chapman, American botanist
- Amy Chapman (born 1987), Australian soccer player
- Andrew G. Chapman (1839–1892), American politician
- Andy Chapman (born 1959), British indoor soccer player
- Anna Chapman or Anna Kushchyenko-Chapman (born 1982), Russian entrepreneur, television host, and agent of the Russian Federation
- Anne Chapman, Franco-American ethnologist
- Annie Chapman (1841–1888), English victim of Jack the Ripper
- Aroldis Chapman (born 1988), Cuban baseball player
- Art Chapman (ice hockey) (1906–1962), Canadian ice hockey player and Olympian
- Art Chapman (basketball) (1912–1986), Canadian basketball player
- Arthur Chapman (poet) (1873–1935), American poet and newspaper columnist
- Arthur B. Chapman (1908–2004), British-American animal genetic researcher
- Asa Chapman (1770–1825), justice of the Connecticut Supreme Court
- Augustus A. Chapman (1805–1876), American lawyer and Democratic Party politician
- Augustus Chapman Allen (1806–1864), American founder of Houston, Texas
- Austin Chapman (1864–1926), Australian Protectionist Party politician

== B ==
- Ben Chapman (politician) (born 1940), British Labour Party politician and former civil servant
- Ben Chapman (actor) (1928–2008), American actor, best known for playing the Gill-man in the 1954 movie Creature from the Black Lagoon
- Ben Chapman (baseball) (1908–1993), American baseball player
- Ben Chapman (footballer, born 1979), English football player
- Benjamin Chapman (1621–unknown), English soldier
- Bert Chapman (born 1942), Australian footballer
- Beth Chapman, American bounty hunter and reality star
- Beth Chapman (politician), American politician from Alabama
- Beth Nielsen Chapman (born 1958), American singer and songwriter
- Billy Chapman (footballer) (1902–1967), English footballer
- Bird Beers Chapman (1821–1871), American editor and Democratic Party politician
- Bob Chapman (born 1946), English footballer, often known as 'Sammy'
- Brenda Chapman, American animator and film director
- Brent Chapman, Canadian politician
- Brian Chapman (born 1968), Canadian ice hockey player
- Brian Chapman (businessman), British businessman
- Bruce K. Chapman (born 1940), American director and founder of the Discovery Institute, and Republican Party politician
- Bruce Chapman (Australian economist), architect of the Higher Education Contribution Scheme in Australia

== C ==
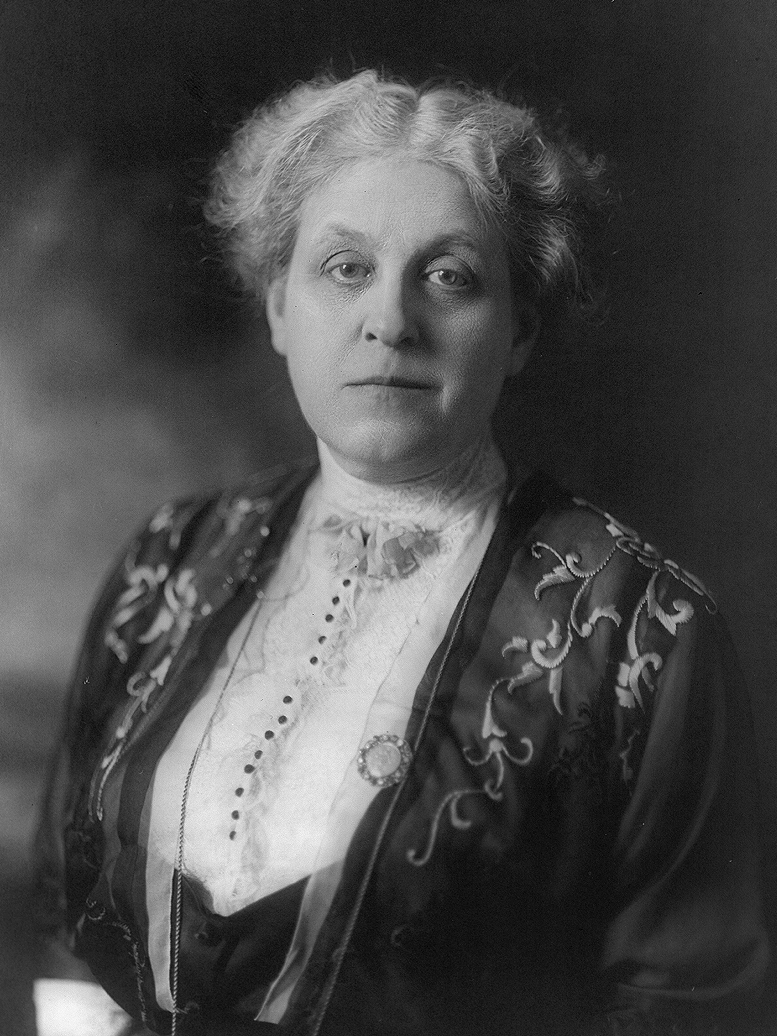
Carrie Chapman Catt, woman's suffrage leader

- Candace Chapman (born 1983), Canadian soccer player
- Carrie Chapman Catt (1859–1947), American woman's suffrage leader
- C.C. Chapman, American prominent figure in the community of podcasting, podsafe music, and new media
- C. H. Chapman (1879–1972), British illustrator and cartoonist, notable for his work on Billy Bunter cartoon strips
- Charles Chapman (disambiguation), several people
- Charles Chapman Grafton (1830–1912), American Bishop of the Diocese of Fond du Lac in The Episcopal Church
- Charlotte Chapman (1762–1805), American-born English actress
- Chris Chapman (real tennis) (born 1985), Australian real tennis player
- Chris Chapman (rugby league), rugby league footballer who played in the 1980s and 1990s
- Christine Chapman (born 1956), Welsh Labour Party politician
- Christopher Chapman (1927–2015), Canadian filmmaker
- Chuck Chapman (1911–2002), Canadian basketball player and Olympian
- Clarence Chapman (born 1953), American football player
- Colin Chapman (disambiguation), several people
- Connor Chapman (born 1994), Australian footballer
- Cornelius Chapman, British poet, songwriter, author, and performer

== D ==
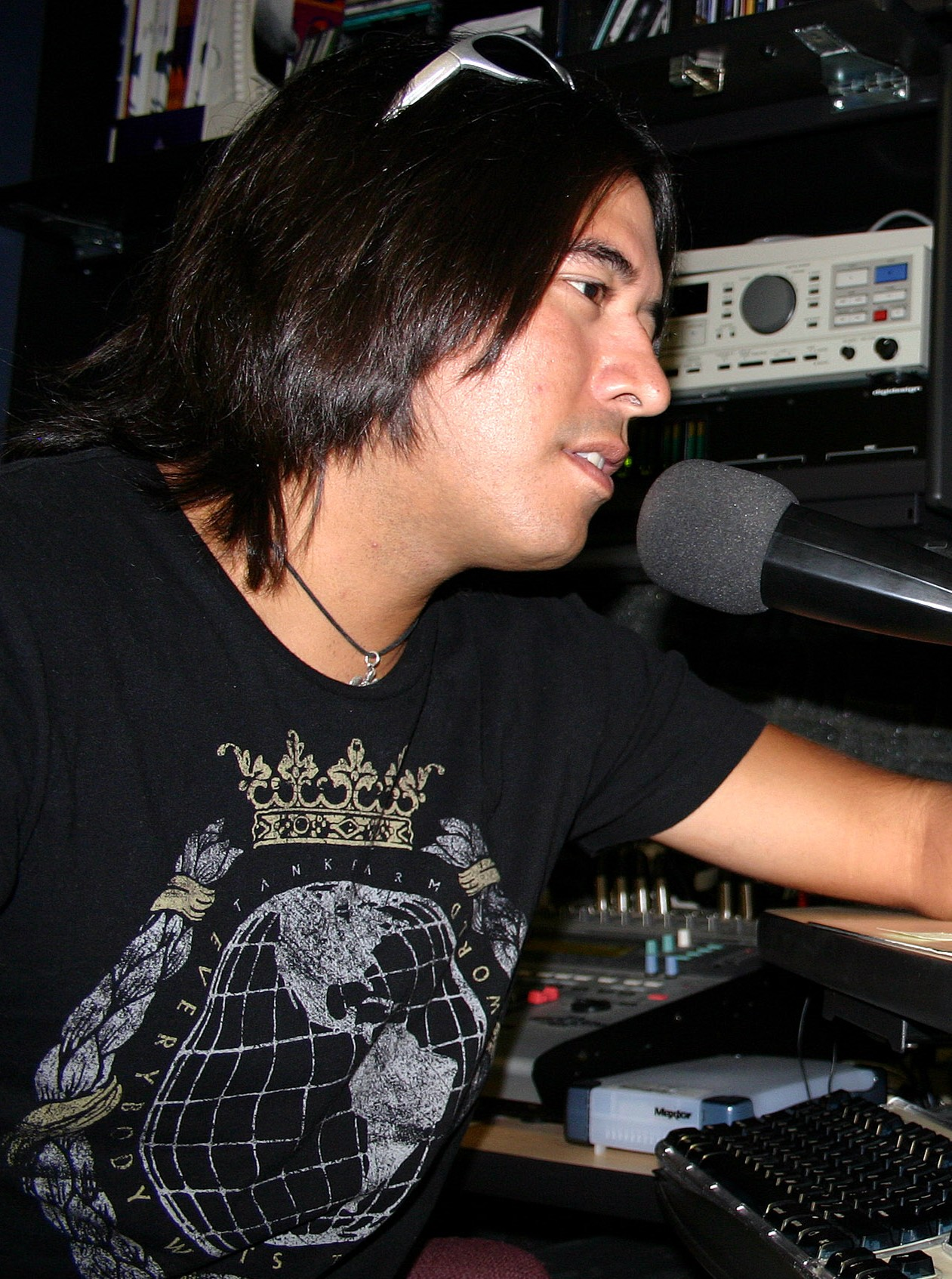
Donovan Chapman, American country music artist

- Damien Chapman, British rugby league player
- Dave Chapman (actor) (born 1973), British actor, television presenter, puppeteer and voice artist
- David Chapman (journalist) (born 1976), American journalist
- David Chapman (chemist) (1869–1958), English physical chemist
- David Chapman (cricketer) (1855–1934), English cricketer
- David Chapman (handballer), American handballer
- Dean Roden Chapman (1922–1995), American mechanical engineer at NASA and Stanford University
- Dick Chapman (1911–1978), American amateur golfer
- Dinos Chapman (born 1962), English conceptual artist
- Donald Chapman, Baron Northfield (1923–2013), British Labour Party politician and life peer
- Donovan Chapman, American country music artist
- Doug Chapman (stuntman), American stunt performer, actor and stunt coordinator
- Doug Chapman (American football) (born 1977), American football player
- Duane Chapman (born 1953), American Hawaii-based bail bondsman and bounty hunter

== E ==
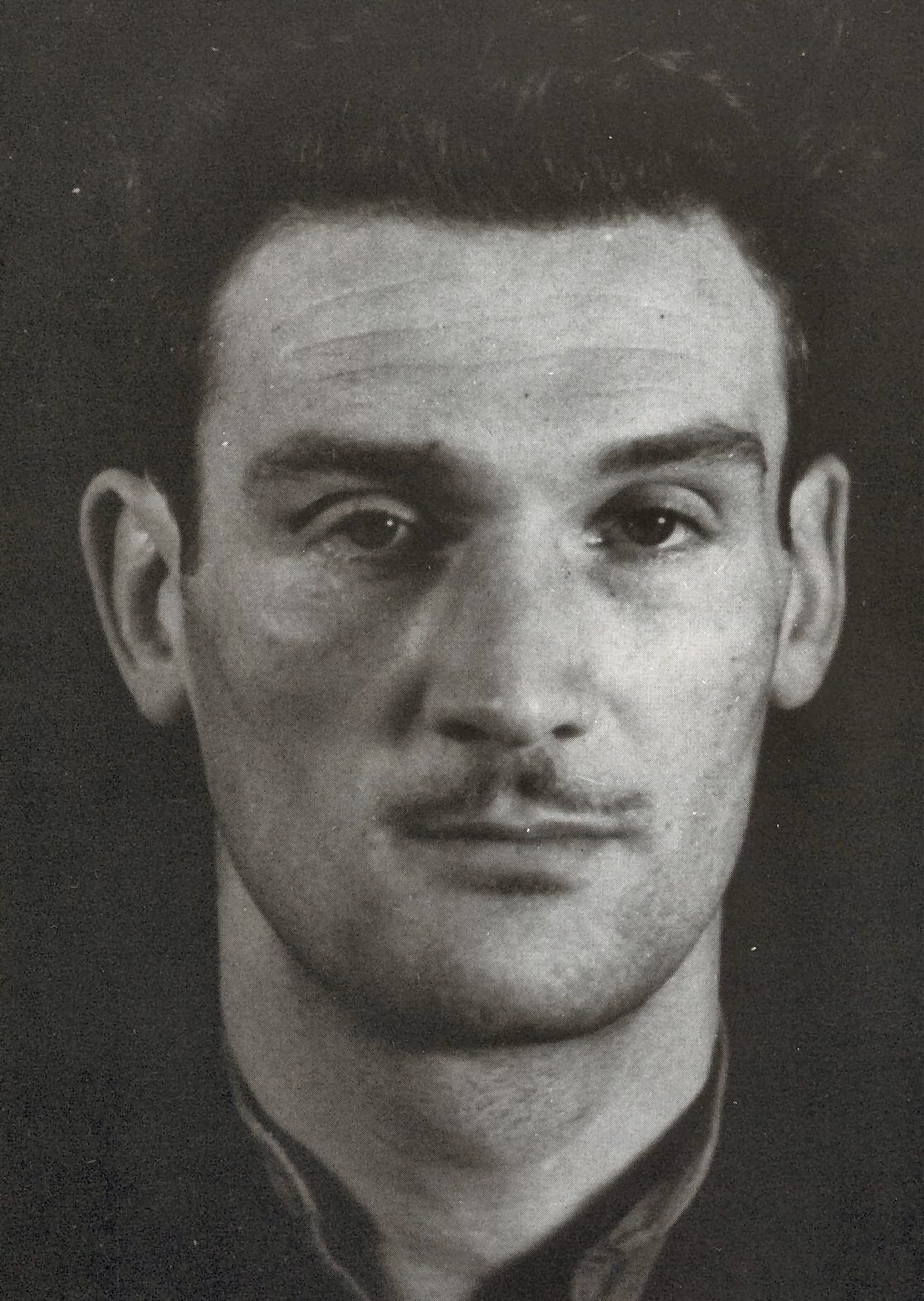
Eddie Chapman, British spy and double agent, aka Agent Zigzag

- Ed Chapman (artist), British artist
- Eddie Chapman (1914–1997), British spy and double agent, aka Agent Zigzag
- Eddie Chapman (footballer) (1923–2002), English footballer and chairman
- Edgar Chapman (1838–1909), Australian brewer and businessman, owner of Theatre Royal, Adelaide
- Edmund Chapman (fl. 1733), English surgeon and man-midwife
- Edmund Chapman (cricketer) (1695–1763), English cricketer
- Edward Chapman (actor) (1901–1977), British comic actor
- Edward Chapman (solicitor) (1813–1894), English solicitor and civil servant, town clerk of Harwich
- Edward Chapman (British Army officer) (1840–1926), British Army officer
- Edward Chapman (politician) (1839–1906), British Conservative Party politician
- Edward Thomas Chapman (1920–2002), Welsh corporal and recipient of the Victoria Cross
- Edythe Chapman (1863–1948), American stage and silent film actress
- Elizabeth Chapman (1919–2005), British children's author
- Ellis Chapman (born 2001), English footballer
- Emmett Chapman, British jazz musician best known as the inventor of the musical instrument Chapman Stick
- Ernest Chapman (1926–2013), Australian rower
- Eugenia S. Chapman (1923–1994), American educator and politician

== F ==
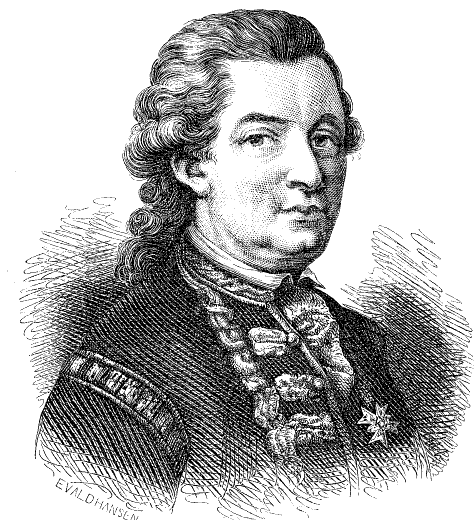
Fredrik Henrik af Chapman, Swedish naval ship architect

- Fern Schumer Chapman, American author
- Frank Chapman (ornithologist) (1864–1945), American ornithologist
- Frank Chapman (baseball) (1861–1937), American baseball player
- Frank Chapman (businessman), British businessman, chief executive of BG Group
- Fred Chapman (baseball) (1916–1997), American baseball player
- Freddie Spencer Chapman (1907–1971), British Army officer and World War II veteran
- Frederick Chapman (palaeontologist) (1864–1943), Australia Commonwealth Palaeontologist
- Frederick Chapman (footballer) (1883–1951), English footballer and Olympic Gold medalist
- Frederick Chapman (sportsman) (1901–1964), Australian cricketer and Australian Rules footballer
- Frederick Chapman (judge) (1849–1936), New Zealand Supreme Court Judge
- Frederick Chapman Robbins (1916–2003), American pediatrician and virologist
- Frederick William Chapman (1806–1876), American Congregational minister, educator, and genealogist
- Fredrik Henrik af Chapman (1721–1808), Swedish naval ship architect

== G ==
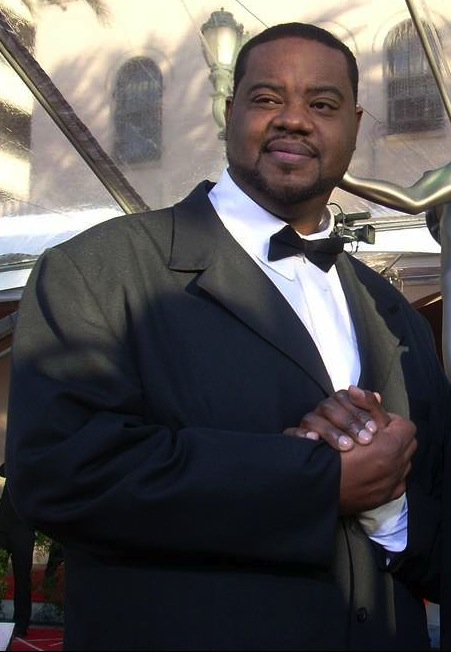
Grizz Chapman, television actor

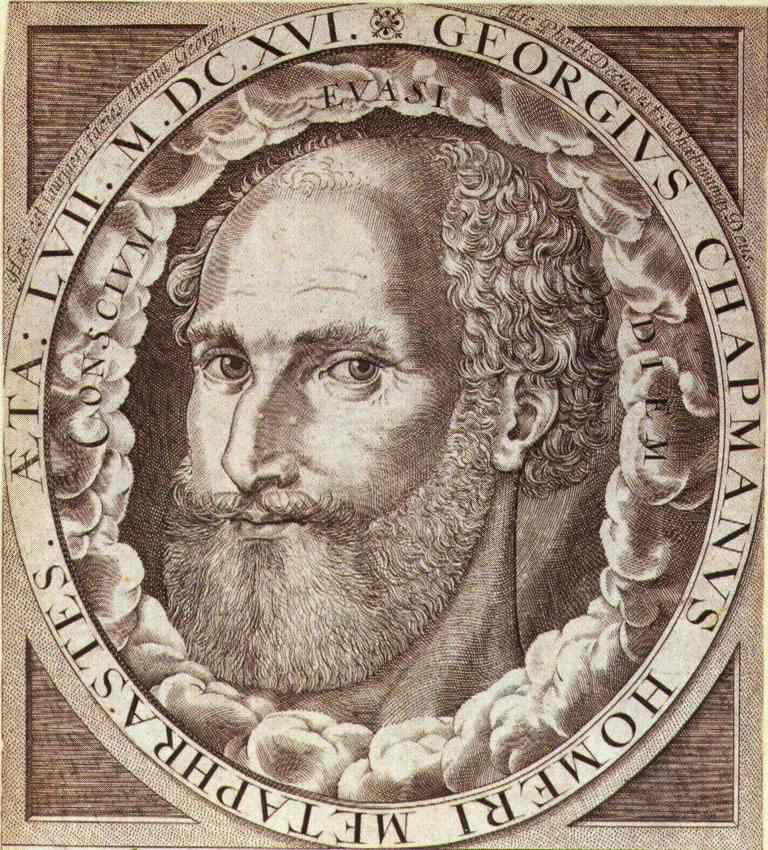
George Chapman, English dramatist, translator and poet

- Gareth Chapman (born 1981), Welsh rugby union player
- Gary Chapman (author), American relationship counselor and author of The Five Love Languages series
- Gary Chapman (swimmer) (1937–1978), Australian swimmer and Olympic bronze medalist
- Gary Chapman (musician) (born 1957), American singer/songwriter and former television talk show host
- George Chapman (1559–1634), English dramatist, translator, and poet
- George Chapman (Dubai) (1925–2023), British ports manager and consultant in Dubai
- George Chapman (murderer) (1865–1903), Polish serial killer, suspected by some as being Jack the Ripper. Born Seweryn Antonowicz Kłosowski
- George Chapman (healer) (1921–2006), British trance healer and medium
- George Chapman (party president) (born 1927), New Zealand accountant, businessman, and company director
- George Henry Chapman (1832–1882), American Civil War General in the Union Army
- George W. Chapman (politician), American lawyer and Democratic Party politician
- Georgina Chapman (born 1976), British fashion designer and actress
- Gerald Chapman (1891–1926), American criminal and gang leader of the Prohibition-era
- Gerald Chapman (director) (1949–1987), British theatre director
- Glenn Chapman (1906–1988), American baseball player
- Graham Chapman (1941–1989), British comedian and writer, member of Monty Python
- Grant Chapman (born 1949), Australian Liberal Party politician
- Grizz Chapman (1974–2026), American television actor, notable appearances in 30 Rock
- Guy Chapman (1889–1972), British author, historian and distinguished World War II soldier

== H ==
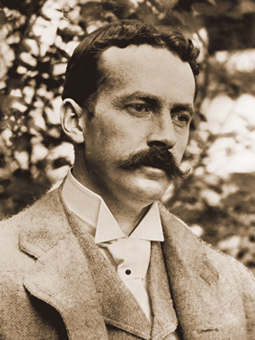
Henry Chapman Mercer, American archeologist

- Hank Chapman, American golden age comic book writer
- Harold Chapman (photographer) (1927–2022), English photographer, especially noted for pictures taken at the Beat Hotel
- Harold Chapman (footballer), New Zealand International footballer
- Harold Chapman (orthodontist) (1881–1965), England's first exclusive orthodontic practitioner
- Harry Chapman (footballer, born 1880) (1880–1916), English footballer and manager
- Harry Chapman (footballer, born 1997), English footballer
- Harry Chapman (news anchor), American television news anchor
- H. E. Chapman (1871–1944), British soldier and police officer
- Harry Chapman Pincher (1914–2014), Indian-born British journalist and novelist
- Hayley Chapman, Australian television presenter and producer
- Henry Chapman (American politician) (1804–1891), American Democratic Party politician
- Henry Grafton Chapman Jr. (1833–1883), American banker
- Henry Samuel Chapman (1803–1881), British-born Australian and New Zealand judge
- Henry Chapman Mercer (1856–1930), American archeologist, artifact collector, tile maker and designer
- Herbert Chapman (1878–1934), English football player and manager, notably of Huddersfield Town and Arsenal
- Horace Chapman (disambiguation)
- Hugh Chapman (1853–1933), British Anglican priest and liberal politician

== I ==
- Ian Russell Chapman (born 1970), English footballer
- Isaac C. Bates (1779–1845), American politician
- Ivan Chapman (1906–1976), English cricketer

== J ==
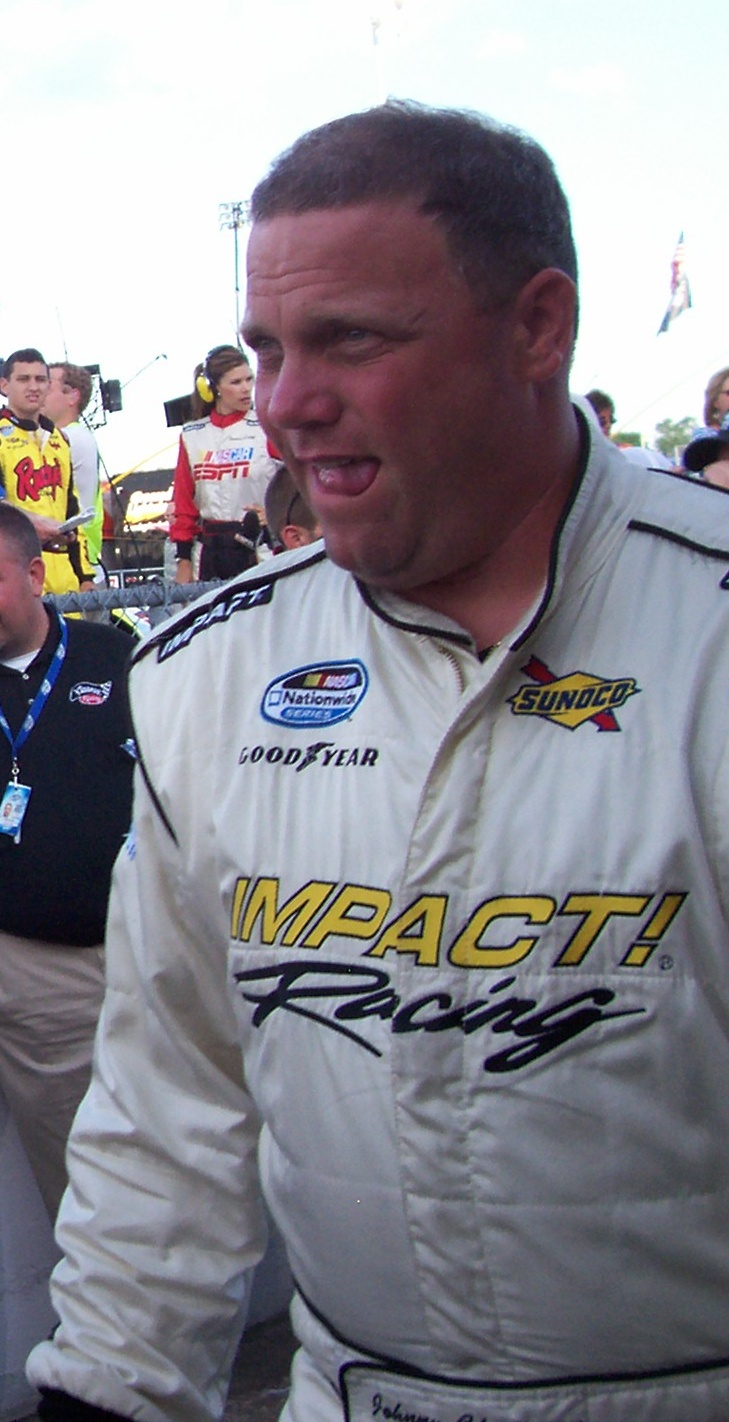
Johnny Chapman, race car driver

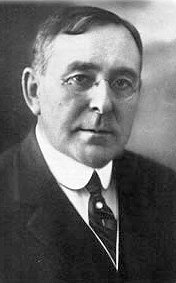
John Wilbur Chapman, American Presbyterian evangelist

- Jake Chapman (born 1966), English conceptual artist
- Jake Chapman (politician), member of the Iowa Senate
- James Chapman (author) (born 1955), American novelist and publisher
- James Chapman (explorer) (1831–1872), South African explorer, hunter, trader and photographer
- James Chapman (bishop) (died 1879), first Bishop of Colombo (Anglican) in Sri Lanka
- James A. Chapman (1881–1966), American businessman and philanthropist
- James Chapman-Taylor (1878–1958), New Zealand domestic architect
- Jan Chapman (born 1950), Australian film producer
- Jane Chapman, British academic
- Janice Chapman, Australian-born British singer and voice coach
- Jay Chapman (physician) (fl.1977), American physician and forensic pathologist
- Jay Chapman (soccer) (born 1994), Canadian soccer midfielder
- J. B. Chapman (1884–1947), American minister and president of Arkansas Holiness and Peniel Colleges
- Jeff Chapman (1973–2005), Canadian urban-explorer, fountaineer, author and editor; also known as Ninjalicious
- Jeff Chapman (politician), American politician
- Jenny Chapman (born 1973), British Labour politician
- Jessica Chapman (1991–2002), murder victim of Ian Huntley
- Jim Chapman (disambiguation), several people
- Johnny Appleseed or John Chapman (1774–1847), American pioneer orchardist and Swedenborgian Christian missionary
- John Chapman (artist) (born 1946), British artist
- John Chapman (screenwriter) (1927–2001), English playwright, screenwriter and scriptwriter
- John Chapman (football manager), English manager of Manchester United football team
- John Chapman (Pennsylvania politician) (1740–1800), American Federalist Party politician
- John Chapman (priest) (1865–1933), British Roman Catholic priest
- John Chapman (publisher) (1821–1894), British publisher and physician
- John A. Chapman USAF MSgt, Combat Controller, posthumously awarded Medal of Honor
- J. D. Chapman (born 1983), American heavyweight boxer
- John Gadsby Chapman (1808–1889), American artist
- John G. Chapman (1798–1856), American Whig Party politician
- John Herbert Chapman (1921–1979), Canadian space researcher from London, Ontario
- John Jay Chapman (1862–1933), American author and essayist
- John Wilbur Chapman (1859–1918), American Presbyterian evangelist
- Johnny Chapman (born 1967), American race car driver in the NASCAR Nationwide series
- Jonathan Chapman (1807–1848), American politician and mayor of Boston
- Jonathan Chapman (academic) (born 1975), British academic, consultant and writer
- Joseph Chapman (actor), American film and television actor
- Joseph A. Chapman, American President of North Dakota State University
- Joseph John Chapman (1784–1849), California pioneer
- Judith Chapman (born 1951), American actress
- Judy Jean Chapman (1941–2025), American nurse and nursing educator
- Julie Chapman, New Zealand charity founder

== K ==
- Katie Chapman (born 1982), English football player
- Karen Chapman (badminton), English badminton player
- Karen Chapman (director), Canadian film and television director
- Keith Chapman (born 1958), British children's author and creator of Bob the Builder
- Keith Chapman (footballer) (1934–2007), Australian rules footballer
- Keith Chapman (organist) (1945–1989), American organist
- Kelvin Chapman (born 1956), American baseball player
- Kevin Chapman, American actor
- Kory Chapman (born 1980), American football player
- Kyle Chapman (New Zealand activist) (born 1971), New Zealand director of the NZNF (New Zealand National Front)
- Kyle Chapman (American activist) (born 1975 or 1976), nicknamed "Based Stickman", American alt-right activist
- Kurtis Chapman (1997–2023), English professional wrestler

== L ==
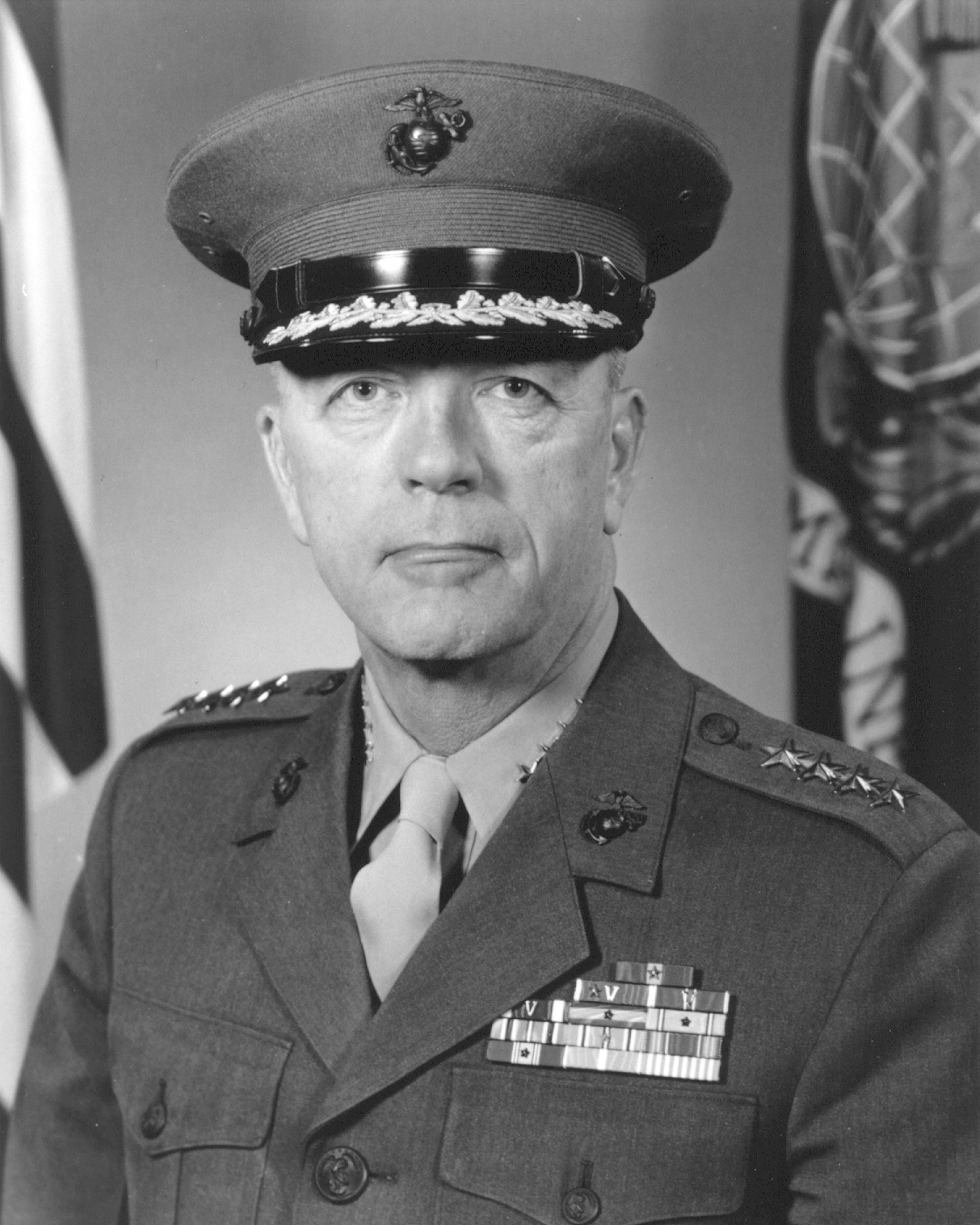
Leonard F. Chapman Jr, American Commandant of the U.S. Marine Corps

- Lamar Chapman (born 1976), American football player
- Lanei Chapman (born 1973), American actress
- Laura Wakim Chapman, American politician
- Lee Chapman (born 1959), English football player
- Leigh M. Chapman (born 1984), American voting rights activist and politician
- Leland Chapman (born 1976), American Hawaii-based bail bondsman and bounty hunter
- Leonard F. Chapman Jr. (1913–2000), American Commandant of the U.S. Marine Corps
- Les Chapman (born 1948), English football player and manager
- Lloyd Chapman (born 1949), American founder of the American Small Business League
- Lonny Chapman (1920–2007), American television actor
- Luke Chapman (born 1991), English footballer
- Lyssa Chapman (born 1987), American bounty hunter

== M ==
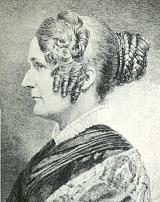
Maria Weston Chapman, American abolitionist

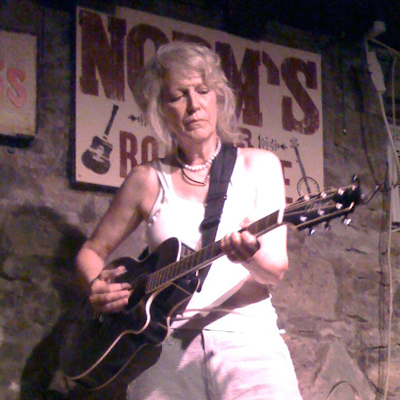
Marshall Chapman, American country rock singer-songwriter

- Maggie Chapman (born 1979), Scottish politician
- Maggie Chapman (singer) (born 1997), American singer-songwriter
- Marco Allen Chapman (1971–2008), American murderer executed in Kentucky
- Margaret Chapman (1940–2000), British illustrator and painter
- Marguerite Chapman (1918–1999), American actress
- Maria Weston Chapman (1806–1885), American abolitionist
- Mariana Wright Chapman (1843–1907), American social reformer, suffragist
- Marina Chapman (born c. 1950), Colombian-born British woman
- Mark Chapman (broadcaster) (born 1973), British radio sports newsreader and DJ
- Mark David Chapman (born 1955), American assassin of former Beatle John Lennon
- Mark Lindsay Chapman (born 1954), English film and television actor
- Marshall Chapman (born 1949), American country rock singer-songwriter
- Mary Chapman, British chief executive of the Chartered Management Institute
- Mary Francis Chapman (1838-1884), Anglo-Irish novelist
- Matt Chapman (The Brothers Chaps), duo responsible for the creation of the Homestar Runner series of animated cartoons
- Matt Chapman, professional baseball player for the San Francisco Giants
- Matthew Chapman (author) (born 1950), British journalist, screenwriter and director; also great-great-grandson of Charles Darwin
- Meyrick Chapman, English Olympian
- Michael Chapman (disambiguation), several people
- Michelle Chapman (known as Tori Black, born 1988), American pornographic actress
- Mike Chapman, Australian record producer and songwriter
- Mike Chapman (The Brothers Chaps), duo responsible for the creation of the Homestar Runner series of animated cartoons
- Minerva J. Chapman (1858–1947), American painter
- Mitchell Chapman (born 1983), Australian Rugby Union player
- Morris Chapman (1940–2025), American pastor

== N ==
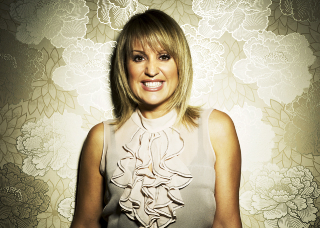
Nicki Chapman, British television presenter

- Nathan Chapman (soldier) (died 2002), American soldier, was the first American killed during the invasion of Afghanistan
- Nathan Chapman (footballer) (born 1975), Australian footballer and American Football player
- Nathaniel Chapman (1780–1853), American physician and founder of The American Journal of the Medical Sciences
- Nicki Chapman (born 1967), British television presenter
- Nicky Chapman, Baroness Chapman (born 1961), British peer
- Nigel Chapman (mayor), British Civic Mayor of Colchester
- Nigel Chapman (cricketer) (born 1945), English cricketer

== O ==
- Orlow W. Chapman (1832–1890), American Solicitor General of the United States
- Oscar Chapman (gridiron football) (born 1999), Australian American football player
- Oscar L. Chapman (1896–1978), American Secretary of the Interior during the last three years of the Truman administration
- Owl Chapman, American surfer

== P ==
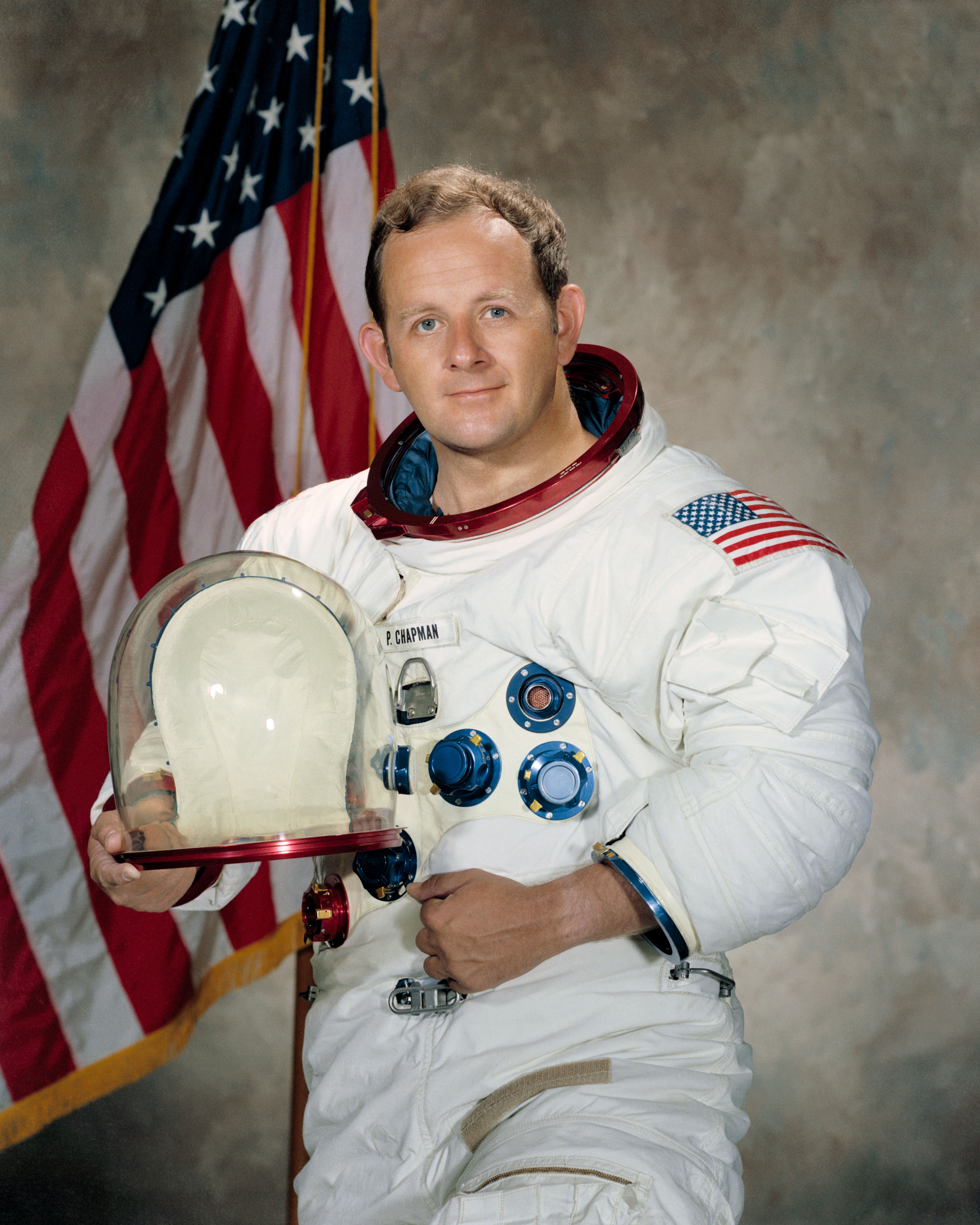
Phillip K. Chapman, Australian astronaut and scientist

- Pat Chapman (food writer), British founder of The Curry Club, and author
- Pat Chapman (footballer) (Patricia Chapman), England women's international footballer
- Patsy Chapman (born 1948), British newspaper editor
- Patrick Chapman, Irish writer and poet
- Paul Chapman (Australian footballer), Australian Rules footballer
- Paul Chapman (musician), Welsh rock guitarist (UFO, Skid Row)
- Paul Chapman (actor), British television actor
- Penny Chapman, Australian television producer
- Percy Chapman (1900–1961), English cricketer
- Percy Chapman Black (1878–1961), Canadian Progressive Conservative Party politician
- Philip K. Chapman (1935–2021), Australian-born American astronaut and scientist

== Q ==
- Quentin Chapman, American politician

== R ==
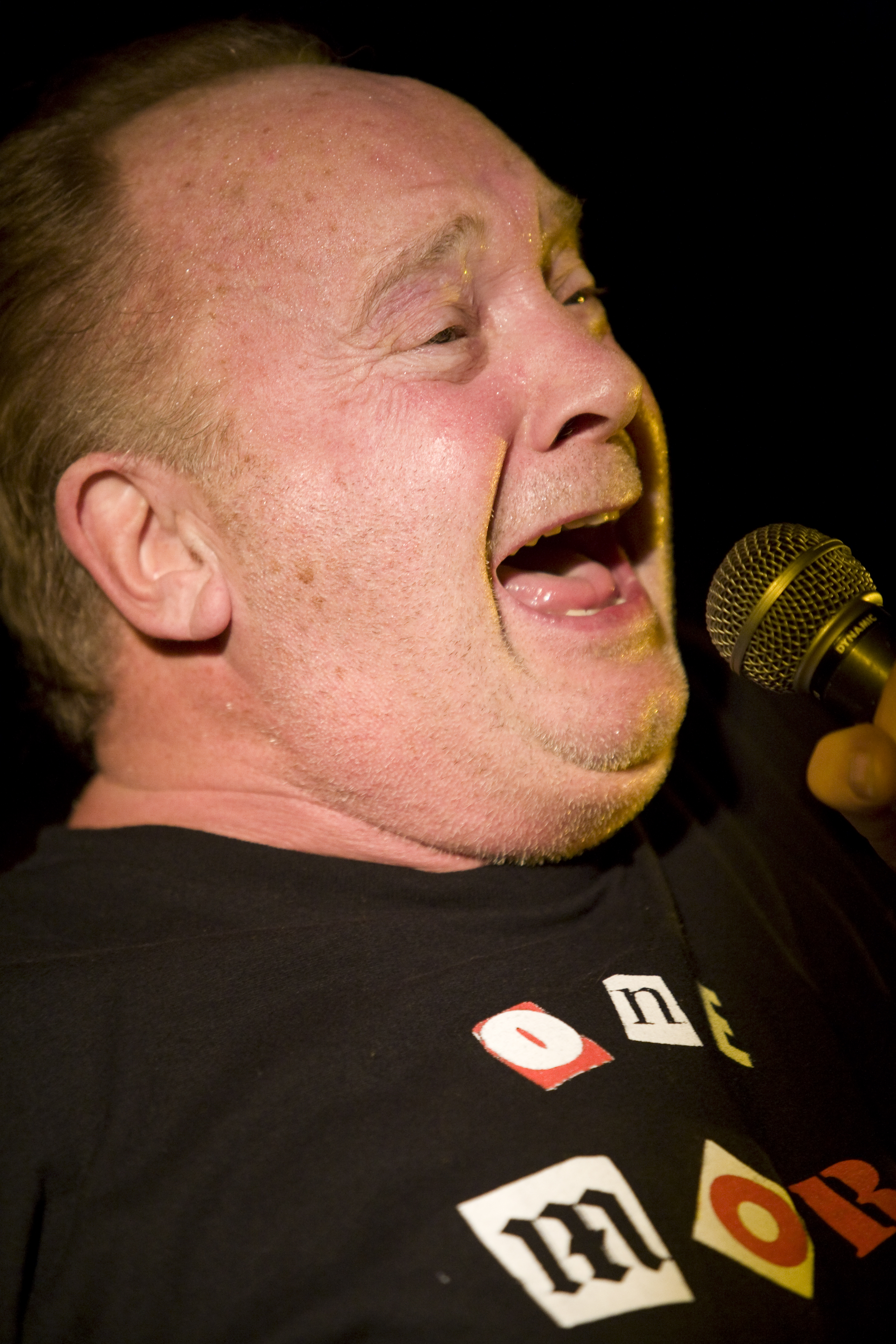
Roger Chapman, British rock singer

- Raffiella Chapman (born 2007), British actress
- Raven Chapman (born 1994), English professional boxer
- Ray Chapman (1891–1920), American shortstop for the Cleveland baseball team
- Reginald Frederick Chapman (1930–2003), English-American entomologist
- Reuben Chapman (1799–1882), American lawyer and politician
- Rex Chapman (born 1967), American professional basketball player
- Richard Chapman (disambiguation), several people
- Robert Chapman (disambiguation), several people
- Robin Chapman (1933–2020), British actor and writer
- Roger Chapman (born 1942), British rock singer
- Roger Chapman (golfer) (born 1959), English golfer
- Roger Chapman (submariner) (1945–2020), British submariner and businessman, rescued from submersible Pisces III in 1973
- Ronald Ivelaw-Chapman (1899–1978), commander in Royal Air Force and Royal Indian Air Force
- Roosevelt Chapman, American basketball player with University of Dayton
- Roy Chapman (1934–1983), English football player and manager
- Roy H. Chapman (1883–1952), Justice of the Florida Supreme Court
- Roy Chapman Andrews (1864–1960), director of American Museum of Natural History
- Royal Norton Chapman (1889–1939), American entomologist and ecologist
- Ryan Chapman (soccer) (born 1987), South African soccer player

== S ==
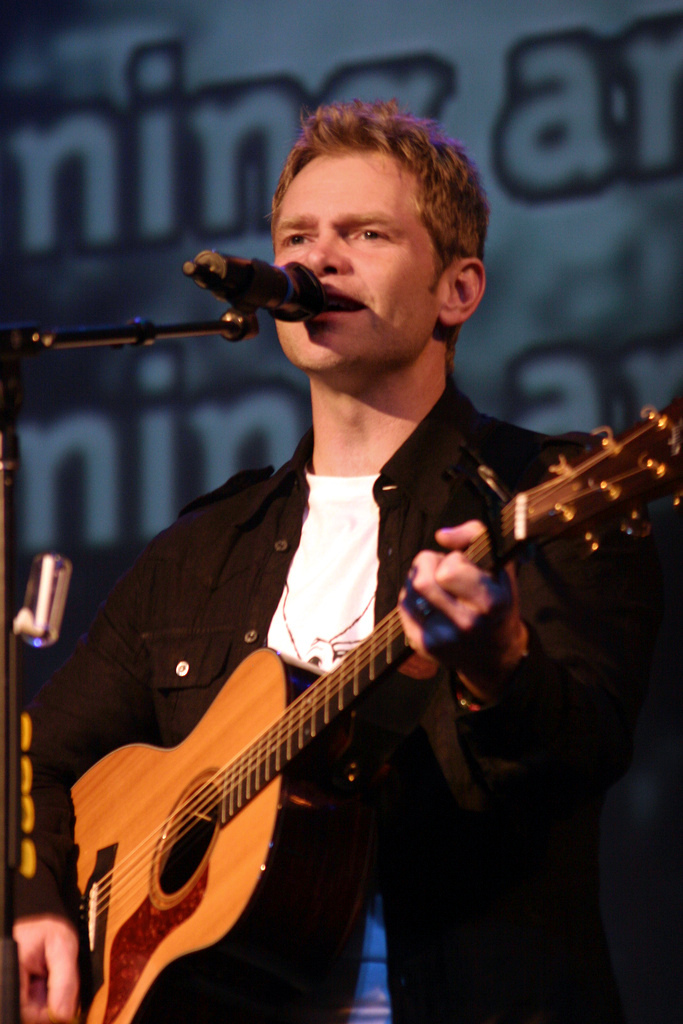
Steven Curtis Chapman, American Christian musician

- Sam Chapman (1916–2006), American college football player and professional baseball player
- Sammy Chapman (1938–2019), Northern Irish footballer and football manager
- Samuel Chapman (British politician) (1859–1947), Scottish Unionist Party politician
- Samuel Belcher Chapman (1800–1880) English philanthropist
- Samuel Chapman (philatelist) (1859–1943), British philatelist who was an expert on Mexican stamps
- Samuel E. Chapman, member of the Wisconsin State Assembly in 1848 and 1861
- Samuel Chapman Armstrong (1838–1893), American educator and officer in the Union Army
- Sean Chapman (born 1961), British actor
- Shane Chapman (born 1978), New Zealand middleweight kickboxer, boxer and martial artist
- Simon Chapman (academic) (born 1951), Australian academic
- Simon Chapman (author), British children's author
- Stanley Chapman (1925–2009), British architect, designer, translator and writer
- Stepan Chapman (1951–2014), American fiction author
- Steve Chapman (ice hockey), ice hockey executive
- Steven Chapman (cricketer) (born 1971), English cricketer
- Steven Curtis Chapman (born 1962), American Christian musician
- Stuart Chapman (born 1951), English footballer and football coach
- Sydney Chapman (economist) (1871–1951), British economist and civil servant
- Sydney Chapman (mathematician) (1888–1970), British astronomer and geophysicist
- Sydney Chapman (politician) (1935–2014), English Conservative Party politician and architect

== T ==
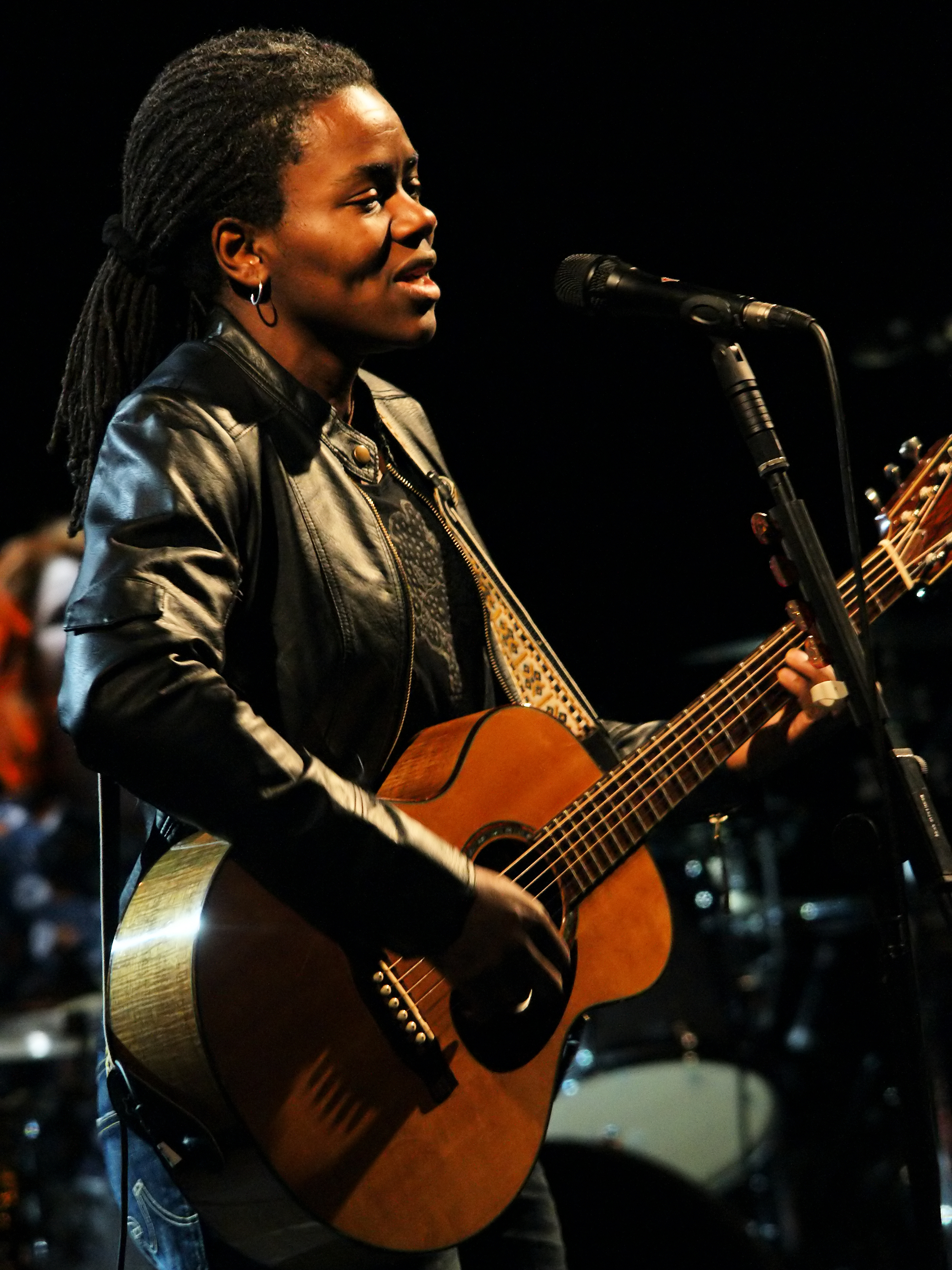
Tracy Chapman, singer songwriter

- Ted Chapman (1934–2005), Australian Liberal Party politician
- Terry Magaoa Chapman (died 2014), Niuean politician and diplomat
- Theodore S. Chapman (1849–1914), American lawyer, businessman, and politician
- Thomas Chapman (disambiguation), multiple people
- Tim Chapman (born 1965), American bounty hunter
- Timothy Granville-Chapman (born 1947), British Vice-Chief of the Defence Staff of the British Armed Forces
- Tony Chapman (born 1941), British musician, early member of The Rolling Stones
- Tracy Chapman (born 1964), American singer-songwriter

== V ==
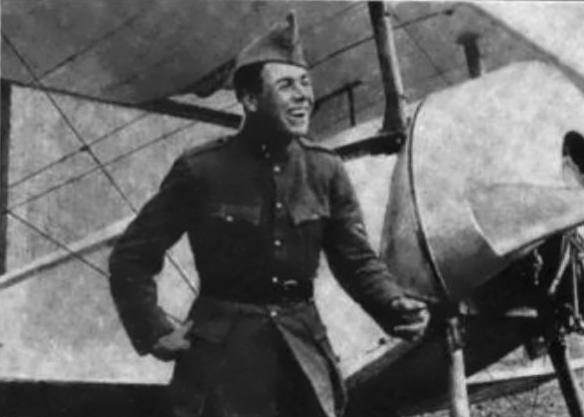
Victor Chapman, French-American wartime pilot

- Vernon Chapman (1921–2006), English footballer and football manager
- Vickie Chapman (born 1957), Australian Liberal Party politician
- Victor Chapman (1890–1916), French-American pilot during World War I
- Vince Chapman (born 1967), English footballer
- Virgil Chapman (1895–1951), American Democratic Party politician

== W ==
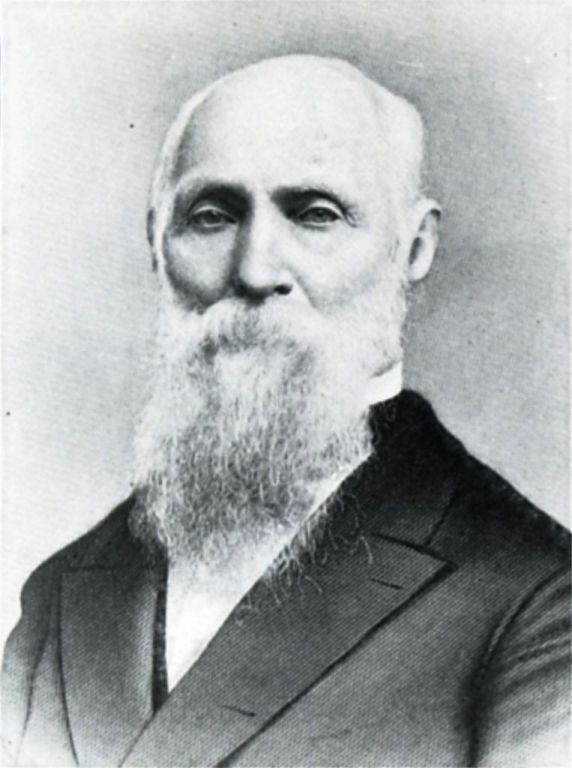
William W. Chapman, American politician in Iowa and Oregon

- Wade Chapman (born 1976), Australian footballer
- Wallace Chapman, New Zealand radio and television host
- Wayne Chapman (disambiguation), multiple people
- William Chapman (disambiguation), multiple people

== Y ==
- Yvonne Chapman (politician) (born 1940), Australian National Party politician

== Fictional characters ==
- Union Jack (Joseph Chapman), in Marvel comics
- William "Billy" Chapman, the antagonist of 1984 film Silent Night, Deadly Night
  - Richard "Ricky" Chapman/Caldwell, brother of Billy and antagonist of later Silent Night, Deadly Night films
- Hedrick Chapman, minor antagonist in the Animorphs novel series
  - Melissa Chapman, Hedrick's daughter
- Piper Chapman, main character in the Netflix series Orange Is the New Black
