= Fred Chapman =

Fred, Frederic or Frederick Chapman may refer to:

- Frederic Chapman (1823–1895), English publisher with Chapman & Hall
- Frederick Chapman (British Army officer) (1815–1893), British Army officer and colonial official
- Frederick Chapman (palaeontologist) (1864–1943), English-born Australian palaeontologist
- Frederick Chapman (footballer) (1883–1951), English soccer player, 1908 Olympic gold medallist
- Fred Chapman (baseball) (1916–1997), American baseball player
- Fred Chapman (rugby union)
- Frederick Chapman (sportsman) (1901–1964), Australian cricketer and Australian rules footballer
- Frederick Chapman (judge) (1849–1936), New Zealand judge
- Freddie Spencer Chapman (1907–1971), British Army officer
- Frederick William Chapman (1806–1876), American minister and genealogist

== See also ==
- Frederick Chapman Robbins (1916–2003), American doctor
