= Chapman =

Chapman may refer to:

== Businesses ==
- Chapman Entertainment, a former British television production company
- Chapman Guitars, a guitar company established in 2009 by Rob Chapman
- Chapman's, a Canadian ice cream and ice water products manufacturer
- Chapman & Hall, a former British publishing house

== People and fictional characters ==
- Chapman (surname), including a list of people and fictional characters
- Chapman Mortimer, pen name of Scottish novelist William Charles Chapman Mortimer (1907–1988)
- Chapman To, Hong Kong actor born Edward Ng Cheuk-cheung in 1972
- Chapman (occupation), itinerant dealers or hawkers in early modern Britain

== Places ==
=== Antarctica ===
- Chapman Glacier (Palmer Land)
- Chapman Glacier (Victoria Land)
- Chapman Hump, a nunatak in Palmer Land
- Chapman Nunatak, Mac. Robertson Land
- Chapman Rocks, Hero Bay, South Shetland Islands

=== Australia ===
- Chapman, Australian Capital Territory, a suburb of Canberra
- Chapman River, a river in the Mid-West region of Western Australia

=== Canada ===
- Chapmans, British Columbia, an unincorporated community
- Chapman Settlement, Nova Scotia
- Chapman Islands, Nunavut

=== South Africa ===
- Chapman's Peak, a mountain on the western side of the Cape Peninsula

=== United States ===
- Chapman, Alabama, an unincorporated community
- Chapman, Pasadena, California, a neighborhood of Pasadena
- Chapman, Illinois, an unincorporated community
- Chapman, Kansas, a city
- Chapman, Maine, a town
- Chapman State Park (Maryland)
- Chapman, Montana, an unincorporated community
- Chapman, Nebraska, a village
- Chapman, Ohio, an unincorporated community
- Chapman, Pennsylvania, a borough
- Chapman State Park, Pennsylvania
- Chapman Creek, Pennsylvania
- Chapman Run, Pennsylvania, a stream
- Chapman, West Virginia, an unincorporated community
- Chapman Bay, a body of water in Washington
- Mount Chapman, on the Tennessee-North Carolina border
- Chapman Avenue, a street in Orange County, California

=== Antarctica, Canada and the United States ===
- Chapman Lake (disambiguation), also includes Lake Chapman
- Chapman Township (disambiguation)

== Schools and school buildings in the United States ==
- Chapman University, a private university in Orange County, California
- Chapman Hall, a building on the University of Oregon campus
- Chapman High School (Kansas)
- Chapman High School (Inman, South Carolina)
- Chapman School of Seamanship, Stuart, Florida
- Maria Weston Chapman Middle School, a school in Weymouth, Massachusetts

== Science ==
- 2409 Chapman, a main belt asteroid
- Chapman (crater), a lunar crater
- Chapman Medal, a Royal Astronomical Society award

== Ships ==
- af Chapman (ship), a full-rigged ship in Stockholm, Sweden, now a youth hostel
- Chapman (1777 ship), a British merchant ship
- NOAAS Chapman (R 446), an American fisheries research vessel

== Other uses ==
- Chapman Piloting, a boating reference work
- Chapman (magazine), a Scottish literary journal
- Chapman (drink), a non-alcoholic cocktail popular in Nigeria
- Chapman Museum, Glens Falls, New York, United States
- Chapman Aerodrome, Yukon, Canada
- Chapman strut, an automobile suspension device
- Chapman baronets, three titles, one in the Baronetage of Great Britain, one in the Baronetage of Ireland and one in the Baronetage of the United Kingdom
- Chapman Stick, a musical instrument
- Chapman System, a pairs playing format in golf
- Chapman Building, in Los Angeles, California

== See also ==
- Chapman code, a 3-letter code used in genealogy
- Chapman function, associated with the absorption integral of the Earth's atmosphere
- Chapman's parakeet, a subspecies of the mitred parakeet
- Chapman's swift, a species of swift in the family Apodidae
- Skelly Field at H. A. Chapman Stadium, University of Tulsa, Oklahoma, United States
