= David Chapman =

David Chapman may refer to:

- David Chapman (journalist) (born 1976), writer/producer covering video games, comic books, and other pop culture interests
- David Chapman (chemist) (1869–1958), English physical chemist
- David Chapman (cricketer) (1855–1934), former first-class cricketer
- David C. Chapman (1876–1944), led initiative to create the Great Smoky Mountains National Park
- David Chapman (handballer) (1975–2017), American handball player
- Dave Chapman (athlete) (born 1936), British steeplechase runner
- Dave Chapman (actor) (born 1973), English actor and television presenter
- David Chapman (Australian sport shooter) (born 1965), Australian rapid fire pistol shooter
- David Chapman (British sport shooter) (born 1963), British sports shooter
- Sir David Chapman, 3rd Baronet (born 1941), British investment banker
- David Chapman (American hotelier), owner of Cataract House in Niagara Falls, New York
- David Chapman (physicist) (born 1953), Canadian physicist after whom asteroid 10047 Davidchapman was named

== See also ==
- Mark David Chapman (born 1955), murderer of John Lennon
