= James Chapman =

James Chapman may refer to:

- J. A. Chapman (1821–1885), three-term mayor of Portland, Oregon
- James Chapman (explorer) (1831–1872), South African explorer, hunter, trader and photographer
- James Chapman (Australian politician) (1855–1925), Tasmanian politician
- James Chapman (bishop) (died 1879), Anglican Bishop of Colombo
- James A. Chapman (1881–1966), Oklahoma oil magnate and philanthropist
- James Chapman (footballer) (1932–1993), Australian rules footballer for Fitzroy
- Ben Chapman (politician) (James Keith Chapman, born 1940), British Labour Party Member of Parliament 1997–2010
- James Chapman (author) (born 1955), American novelist
- James Chapman (media historian) (born 1968), British media historian
- James Chapman (rower) (born 1979), Australian rower
- James Chapman (cricketer) (born 1986), English cricketer
- James Chapman, English musician, known professionally as Maps

== See also ==
- Jim Chapman (disambiguation)
