= Chapman (given name) =

Chapman is a masculine given name. Notable people with the name include:

- Chapman L. Anderson (1845–1924), American politician
- Chapman Biddle (1822–1880), Union United States Army officer
- Chapman James Clare (1853–1940), British-Australian sailor
- Chapman Cohen (1868–1954), English atheist, secularist writer, and lecturer
- Chapman B. Cox (born 1940), American politician
- Chapman Freeman (1832–1904), American politician
- Chapman Grant (1887-1983), American zoologist, historian and publisher
- Chapman H. Hyams (1838–1923), Stockbroker, art collector and philanthropist
- Chapman Johnson (1777–1849), American politician
- Chapman Levy (1787–1849), American lawyer, officer in war of 1812
- Chapman Mortimer (1907–1988), Scottish novelist
- Chapman Pincher (1914–2014), English journalist
- Chapman Revercomb (1895–1979), American politician and lawyer
- Chapman To (born 1972), Hong Kong-Taiwanese actor
- Chapman Way, American documentary filmmaker

== See also ==
- Chapman (disambiguation)
- Chapman (surname)
