= Samuel Chapman =

Samuel or Sam Chapman may refer to:

- Samuel Belcher Chapman (1800–1880), English philanthropist based in Ipswich, Suffolk
- Samuel E. Chapman, American politician, member of the Wisconsin State Assembly in 1848 and 1861
- Sir Samuel Chapman (British politician) (1859–1947), Scottish Unionist Party politician
- Samuel Chapman (philatelist) (1859–1943), British philatelist who was an expert on Mexican stamps
- Sam Chapman (footballer) (1876-1949), Australian footballer
- Sam Chapman (1916–2006), American college football player and professional baseball player
- Sammy Chapman (born 1938), Northern Irish footballer and football manager
- Sam Chapman (speedway rider) (born 1989), English motorcyclist
- Samuel S. Chapman, fictional senator, in the 1980 film, The Final Countdown
