= Mary Francis (disambiguation) =

Mary Francis (born 1948) is a British former civil servant.

Mary Francis may also refer to:

- Mary Margaret Francis (1924-2000), British author
- Mary Francis Ames (1853–1929), British writer and illustrator of children's books
- Mary Francis Bridgeman (1813–1888), Irish nun and nurse
- Mary Francis Chapman (1838–1884), British novelist
- Mary Francis Hill Coley (1900–1966), American lay midwife
- Mary Francis Masanja (born 1975), Tanzanian politician
- Mary Francis Shura (1923–1991), American novelist

== See also ==
- Mary Frances (disambiguation)
