= Chapman (occupation) =

Obsolete term for merchant

A chapman (plural chapmen) was an itinerant dealer or hawker in early modern Britain.

== Etymology ==
Old English céapmann was the regular term for "dealer, seller", cognate with the Dutch koopman, German Kaufmann, Swedish köpman, Danish købmand, and Icelandic kaupmaður altogether carrying the same meaning. Old English cēap /t͡ʃæ͜ɑːp/ meant "deal, barter, business" derived from Latin caupo meaning 'tradesman'. The modern descendant adjective cheap is a comparatively recent development from the phrase a good cheap, literally "a good deal" (cf. modern Dutch goedkoop = cheap). The word also appears in names such as Cheapside, Eastcheap, Chepstow and the prefix Chipping: all markets or dealing places. The name of the Danish capital Copenhagen has a similar origin, being derived from Køpmannæhafn meaning "chapmen's haven" or "merchants'/buyers' harbour".

By 1600, the word chapman had come to be applied to an itinerant dealer in particular, but it remained in use for "customer, buyer" as well as "merchant" in the 17th and 18th centuries. The slang term for man, "chap" arose from the use of the abbreviated word to mean a customer, one with whom to bargain.

The word was applied to hawkers of chapbooks, broadside ballads, and similar items. Their stock in trade provides a graphic insight into the methods of political and religious campaigners of the Civil War period, for example.

Chapman is also a common personal name of the class derived from trades.

== See also ==
- People with the name Chapman
- Places and things named Chapman
