= Keith Chapman (disambiguation) =

Keith Chapman is an English television writer and producer who created Bob the Builder and PAW Patrol.

Keith Chapman may also refer to:

- Keith Chapman (footballer) (1934–2007), Australian rules footballer
- Keith Chapman (organist) (1945–1989), American concert organist
