= Colin Chapman (disambiguation) =

Colin Chapman (1928–1982) was an English design engineer, inventor, and builder in the automotive industry, and founder of Lotus Cars.

Colin Chapman may also refer to:

- Colin Chapman (cricketer) (born 1971), English cricketer
- Colin Chapman (primatologist), Canadian primatologist
- Colin R Chapman, introducer of the Chapman code in genealogy
