= Judy Chapman =

Judy Chapman may refer to:

- Judith Chapman, American actress
- Judy Jean Chapman, American nurse and college professor
