= Chapman Lake =

Chapman Lake or Lake Chapman may refer to:

- Chapman Lake (Pennsylvania), a reservoir in Warren County
- Chapman Lake (Wisconsin), a lake in Sauk County
- Jim Chapman Lake, a lake in Hopkins County, Texas
- Lake Chapman (Antarctica), a lake located at Granite Harbour
- Chapman Lake (Gouin Reservoir), Quebec, Canada

== See also ==
- Chapman (disambiguation)
