= Mary Frances =

Disambiguation name page

Mary Frances may refer to:

== People ==
- Mary Frances Allitsen (1848–1912), English composer
- Mary Frances Berry (born 1938), American historian, writer, lawyer, activist, and professor
- Mary Frances Billington (1862–1925), English journalist and writer
- Mary Frances Clardy (born 1958), American politician
- Mary Frances Clarke (c. 1802–1887), Irish nun
- Mary Frances Creighton (1899–1936), American woman convicted and executed for murder
- Mary Frances Crowley (1906–1990), Irish educator and nurse
- Mary Frances Dowdall (1876–1939), English writer
- Mary Frances Early (born 1936), American educator
- Mary Frances of the Five Wounds (1715-1791), Italian Roman Catholic nun and saint
- Mary Frances Garrigus (1891–1918), Native American lawyer
- Mary Frances Gerety (1916–1999), American copywriter
- Mary Frances Gunner (1894–1953), African American playwright and community leader
- Mary Frances Heaton (1801–1878), English woman permanently committed to an insane asylum
- Mary Frances Isom (1865–1920), American librarian
- Mary Frances Jeffries (1819–1891), English madam and procuror
- Mary Frances Kennedy Fisher (1908–1992), American food writer
- Mary Frances Leach (1858–1939), American chemist and professor of chemistry and hygiene
- Mary Frances Linder Fitzpatrick (1861–1955), American botanist
- Mary Frances Lovell (1843–1932), British-born American writer, humanitarian, and temperance reformer
- Mary Frances McCray (1837–1898), American Methodist church leader
- Mary Frances McDonald (1929–2021), Irish feminist
- Mary-Frances Monroe (born 1980), American soccer player
- Mary Frances Overbeck (1878–1955), American potter
- Mary Frances Penick, birth name of Skeeter Davis (1931–2004), American country music singer and songwriter
- Mary Frances Reynolds (1932–2016), American actress, singer, and businesswoman
- Mary Frances Ronalds (1839–1916), American socialite and singer
- Mary Frances Schervier (1819–1876), German Catholic nun
- Mary Frances Scott-Siddons (1844–1896), British actress and dramatic reader
- Mary Frances Thompson, birth name of Te Ata (actress) (1895–1995), Chickasaw actress and storyteller
- Mary Frances Tucker (1837–1902), American poet
- Mary Frances Vashon (c. 1818–1854), African American journalist and abolitionist
- Mary Frances Welch (1924–2021), American teacher and fashion designer
- Mary Frances Williams (born 1955), American politician
- Mary Frances Winston Newson (1869–1959), American mathematician
- Mary Frances Xavier Warde (1810–1884), Irish-born American Roman Catholic nun

== Fictional characters ==
- Mary-Frances Sumner, in the US primetime TV soap opera Knots Landing, played by Stacy Galina

== See also ==
- Mary Francis (disambiguation)
