= Thomas Chapman =

Thomas Chapman may refer to:

- Thomas Chapman (actor) (1683–1747), British stage actor
- Tom Chapman (born 1972), French-English musician
- Thomas Chapman (Australian politician) (1815–1884), Premier of Tasmania
- Thomas Chapman (bishop) (1867–1949), Anglican bishop
- Thomas Chapman (Master of Magdalene College) (1717–1760), English churchman and academic
- Sir Thomas Chapman, 2nd Baronet, Irish landowner
- Sir Thomas Chapman, 7th Baronet (1846–1919), Anglo-Irish landowner
- Thomas Chapman (footballer) (1871–1929), English footballer
- Thomas Chapman (cricketer) (1918–1979), English cricketer
- Thomas Algernon Chapman (1842–1921), Scottish entomologist
- Thomas Howard Chapman, Director of Public Works of Ceylon and acting Commander of the Ceylon Defence Force
- Thomas W. Chapman (1814–1905), American politician from Ohio
- Thomas Chapman (MP) (1663–?), British lawyer and politician

== See also ==
- Chapman (surname)
