= Robert M. McFarlin =

American businessman

- Born: July 27, 1866; Ovilla, Texas, US
- Died: August 11, 1942 (aged 76); Kansas City, Missouri, US
- Occupation: Businessman

Robert M. McFarlin (July 27, 1866 – August 11, 1942) was an American oilman, cattle rancher, philanthropist, and businessman who is best known for amassing a fortune by drilling for oil near Glenpool, Oklahoma, with his nephew and son-in-law, James A. Chapman. He was among the early pioneer oilmen who established the state of Oklahoma as a center of the oil industry in the early part of the 20th century.

== Early life ==
Robert McFarlin was born July 27, 1866 to Porter and Caroline McFarlin in Ovilla, Texas (near Waxahachie). He married Ida Barnard in 1886. They moved to the town of Norman, then in Oklahoma Territory, in 1890, where they worked as cattle farmers and operated a feed store, During this time, their only son was born and died. They then moved to a farm in Indian Territory near the town of Holdenville in 1895.

== Business activities ==
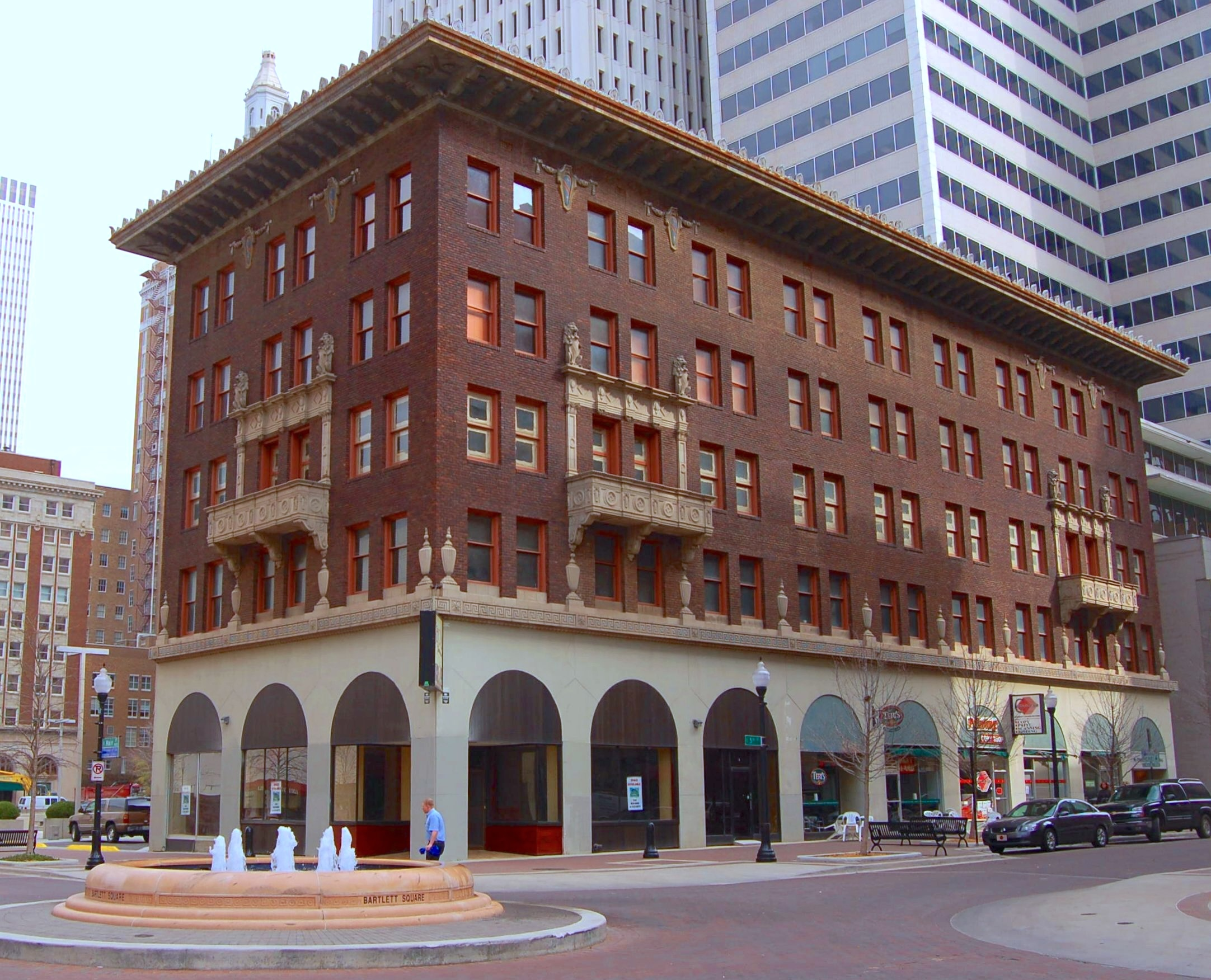
McFarlin Building in Tulsa, Oklahoma as it appeared in 2008

McFarlin and Chapman had first partnered in 1903 to create the Holdenville Oil and Gas Company, which owned 10 acres (4.0 ha) in the middle of the Glenn Pool oil field. In 1912, after the discovery of the even larger Cushing Oil Field, the two founded the McMan Oil Company, which they sold to the Magnolia Petroleum Company in 1916 for $39 million. In 1918, McFarlin built an office building at 5th and Main in Tulsa, thereafter known as the McFarlin Building. The building still serves as a general office building. Also in 1918, McFarlin and Chapman organized the McMan Oil and Gas Company, which they sold to the Dixie Oil Company, a subsidiary of Standard Oil Company of Indiana, for $20 million in 1922. The McFarlin Building at 11 E. 5th Street in Tulsa was listed in the National Register of Historic Places on December 6, 1979, and its NRIS number is 79002030.

In 1910, McFarlin, Harry Sinclair and some others organized the Exchange National Bank of Tulsa, which later became the National Bank of Tulsa, and is now the Bank of Oklahoma (BOK).

== Philanthropy ==
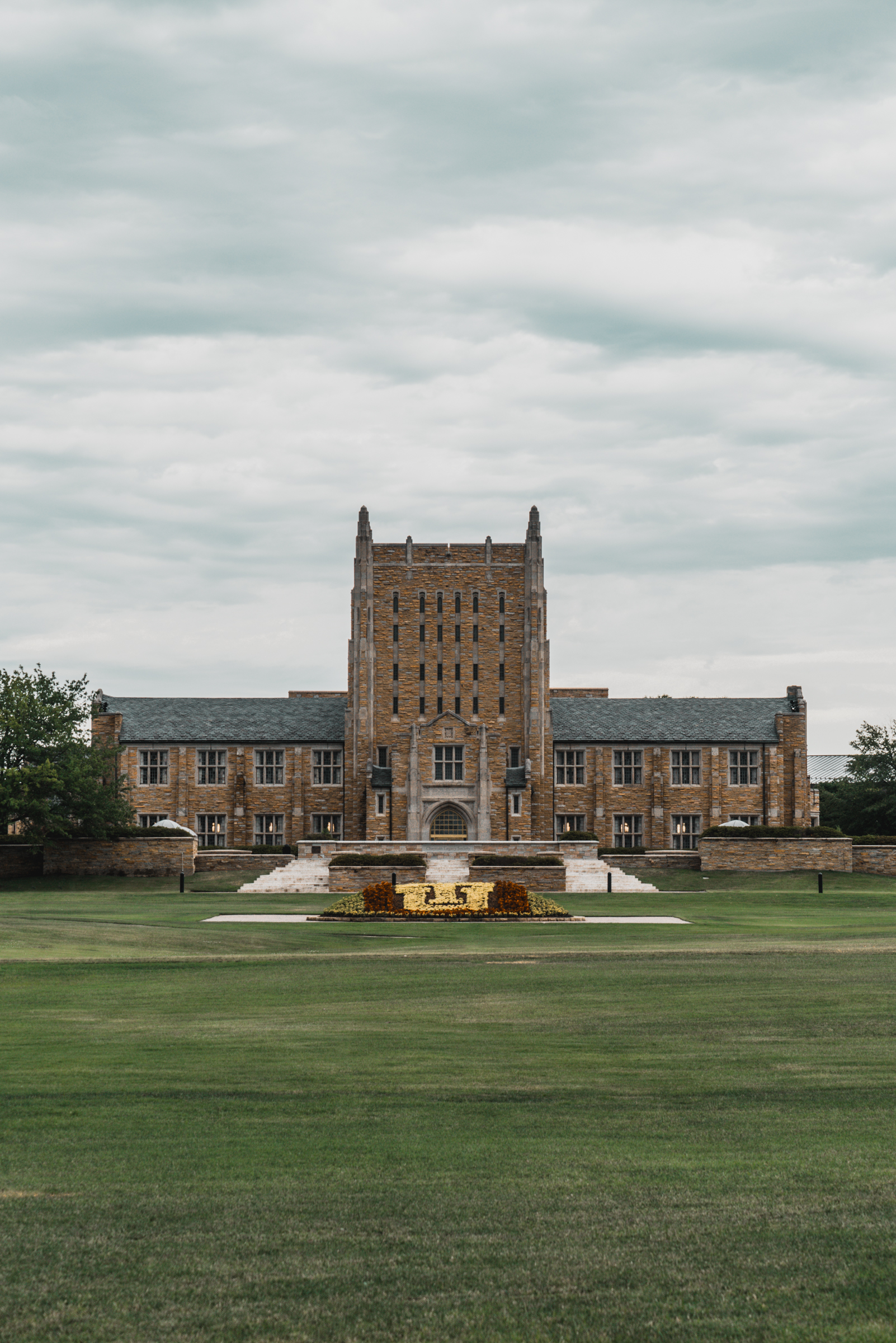
McFarlin Library at University of Tulsa in 2018

McFarlin's philanthropy centered on churches and higher education. The most significant projects funded by the McFarlin family included:

McFarlin College was the proposed name of a college to be located in the city of Tulsa, Oklahoma. It was initially proposed that the new institution of higher education be a Methodist-affiliated college. It ceased to exist as an entity when it merged with Henry Kendall College in 1920 to form the University of Tulsa. In 1929, he contributed $450,000 to build the McFarlin Library of the University of Tulsa, which is still in use.

In 1924, the Methodist Church South in Norman called on Robert McFarlin during a fund raising drive to build a new church building. Remembering the support given by the church when their infant son had died in Norman, the McFarlins made a generous contribution toward the new building. In addition, they established an endowment to support maintenance of the church. The contribution was valued at $600,000 in 1924. McFarlin Memorial United Methodist Church, located in Norman, Oklahoma, stands in honor of his contributions to the United Methodist Church.

In 1925, the McFarlin family donated $600,000 to build the McFarlin Auditorium on the Southern Methodist University campus in Dallas, Texas.

== McFarlin House ==
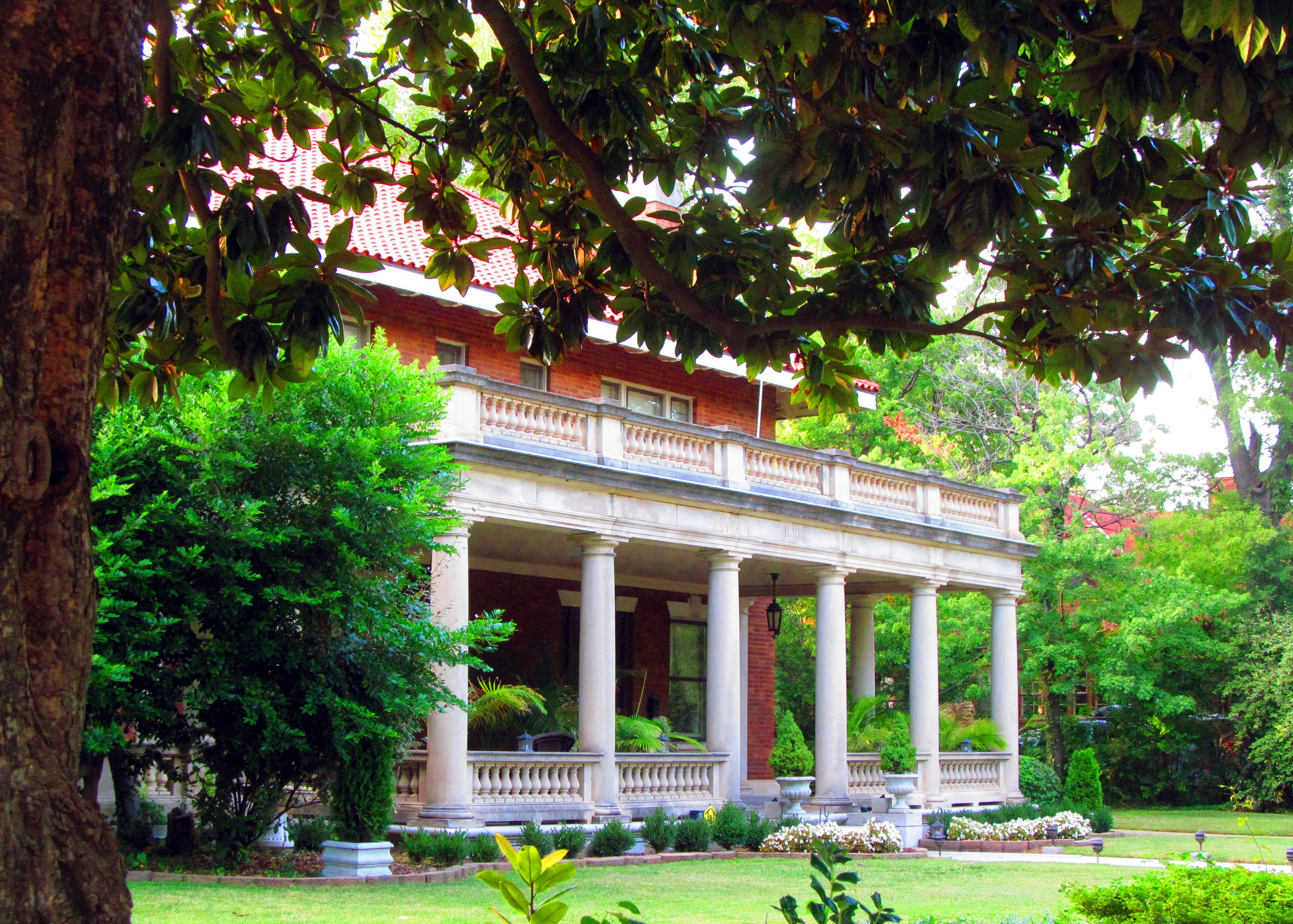
The McFarlins lived at 1610 Carson Avenue in Tulsa.

The McFarlin house at 1610 S. Carson Ave. in Tulsa, was listed in the National Register of Historic Places on January 25, 1979, under National Register Criteria C. Its NRIS number is 79002031.

== Personal and family ==
McFarlin was married to Ida May Barnard. Ida died of a cerebral hemorrhage in a San Antonio hospital, and was buried in the IOOF Cemetery in Norman, Oklahoma. Robert died August 11, 1942, in Kansas City, Missouri, and was also buried in the IOOF Cemetery in Norman. They had two daughters and one son. Their son, Robert Boger, was born in 1891 died of typhoid fever at the age of one month and 19 days. His nephew and partner, Chapman, had married their daughter, Leta Mae, in 1908. Both Robert and Ida McFarlin were inducted into the Oklahoma Hall of Fame in 1935.

== Bibliography ==
- Tyson, Carl N. The McMan: The lives of Robert M. McFarlin and James A. Chapman. Norman: University of Oklahoma Press (1977). ISBN 0806114460
