= James Allwood Smith =

American politician

James Allwood Smith (November 6, 1806 – April 15, 1882) was an American minister and state legislator.

Smith, son of Norman and Elizabeth (Kingsbury) Smith, was born in Hartford, Connecticut, November 6, 1806. He graduated from Yale College in 1826. After graduating he spent nearly two years as principal of the Union Academy in New London, Connecticut. He then entered the Yale Divinity School, and completed his course of preparation for the ministry at Andover Theological Seminary in 1831.

He was ordained pastor of the Congregational Church at Great Falls, in the town of Somersworth, New Hampshire, April 17, 1832. He was dismissed from this charge, July 24, 1837, and on the 6th of December following was installed over the First Congregational Church in Glastonbury, Connecticut, where he continued for twenty years. Early in 1858 he removed to Unionville, in the town of Farmington, Connecticut, where he remained until his death, after three days' illness, of dropsy of the heart, on April 15, 1882. He had been usefully occupied during much of his residence in Unionville in supplying vacant churches in the neighborhood, and had served for one year (1867) as a member of the Connecticut State Legislature.

In July, 1832, he married Mary Morgan, of Hartford; of their ten children, two sons and two daughters survived him, the elder son being a graduate of Yale in the class of 1854.

Smith was a life-long friend of his Yale College schoolmate, Rev. Frederick William Chapman.
