= Chapman Lake (Wisconsin) =

- Location within Wisconsin Location within the United States
- Location: Sauk County, Wisconsin
- Coordinates: 43.559118°N 89.659462°W
- Type: lake
- Surface elevation: 804 feet (245 m)

Chapman Lake is a lake in Sauk County, in the U.S. state of Wisconsin.

Chapman Lake was named for Parker Chapman.

== See also ==
- List of lakes in Wisconsin
