= Richard Chapman =

Richard Chapman may refer to:

- Richard Chapman (cricketer) (1918–2004), South African cricketer
- Richard Chapman (MP) (died 1580), Member of Parliament (MP) for Bath
- Richard Chapman (musician) (born 1956), British guitarist, composer and author
- Richard Chapman (shipwright) (1520–c. 1592), owner of a private shipyard at Deptford
- Dick Chapman (1911–1978), American amateur golfer
