= Colin Chapman (primatologist) =

Colin A. Chapman is a professor at the Vancouver Island University in British Columbia, Canada. In addition, he is a Fellow of the Royal Society of Canada, an Honorary Lecturer at Makerere University in Uganda, a Member of the Committee of Research and Exploration at National Geographic, and an Associate Scientists of the Wildlife Conservation Society in New York. Prior to taking on his position at McGill University, he was at the University of Florida in the Department of Zoology from 1993 to 2004. He is internationally recognized for his 30+ years of research into primate ecology, population regulation, nutrition, and disease dynamics and for his contribution to conservation globally.

He is Director of the Kibale Monkey Project; a long-term project in Kibale National Park, Uganda that he started in 1989, building on the data of Thomas Struhsaker from Duke University who worked in Kibale from 1970 to 1987. The project focuses on primate ecology and conservation, but also has a very strong component examining forest dynamics, including those driven by climate change, elephant numbers, and forest succession. The team of researchers he has worked with have also placed a heavy emphasis on conservation strategies, including forest regeneration, animal population recovery, fragmentation, people-parks relationships, zoonotic disease spread, and the link between providing health care and conservation.

== Early life and education ==
Chapman was born in Edmonton, Alberta, Canada, and he did all of his degrees (B.Sc., MA. Ph.D.) at the University of Alberta and obtained a joint Ph.D. under the supervision of Drs. Linda Fedigan, John Addicott, and Jan Murie. He went on to do a Post-doc with Louis Lefebvre in Biology at McGill University and then Richard Wrangham in Anthropology at Harvard University. Prior to coming to Harvard he conducted primate research in the Caribbean (St. Kitts) and Costa Rica, but when at Harvard he started research in Kibale National Park, Uganda.

His interest in conservation started in Costa Rica as this was the time of the growth and the countries park system and he conducted surveys in the area that was to become Guanacaste National Park, with the aim of helping Daniel Janzen evaluate wildlife recovery. But conservation became the tenet of his research in Uganda, where he helped establish Makerere University Biological Field Station, develop the chimpanzee ecotourism, encouraged the local community to establish small scale but sustainable ecotourism efforts, aided in fisheries management plans, worked on evaluating forest regeneration for the Uganda Wildlife Authority. He contributed to making Kibale field stations sustainable through forming a consortium of University users and establishing a core of courses to come to the station (Canadian Field Studies in Africa, Tropical Biology Association, Makerere University, Waterloo), and established a clinic and then a mobile clinic. The clinics act as an instrument between the park and the local communities as the clinics provide subsidized health care in return for improved park-people relationship. Throughout this time he put a great deal of effort into the training of Ugandan students and park personnel.

== Honours and awards ==
Year	Award
2017	Velan Award for Humanitarian Service
2012 - 2014	Killam Research Fellow
2012–present	Canadian Research Chair – Primate Ecology and Conservation (Tier 1)
2012	Globe and Mail newspaper - the most cited Anthropologist in Canada
2010–present	Fellow of the Royal Society of Canada
2005 - 2011	Canadian Research Chair – Primate Ecology and Conservation (Tier 1)
2003	Anderson Teacher Scholar – University of Florida

== Research ==
Early in his career he was interested in ecological factors influencing group size, social organization, and population regulation, and it was this later interest that led him to conservation – that and the plight of primates that he witnessed through the course of his research. Early in his Ph.D. he became interested in that determined the size of spider monkey (Ateles geoffroyi) groups and this eventually lead him to formalize what he coined the Ecological Constraints Model. A challenge from Daniel Janzen to show that primates had any ecologically significant role lead him to study seed dispersal and then the role of primates in forest regeneration of tropical tree dynamics. Forest regeneration remained a subject that he revisited throughout his research career to demonstrate the longitudinal dynamics of regeneration as observed in different parts of the forest that experienced different degrees of disturbance in the past.

While in Kibale he became fascinated with red colobus and the determinants of both their group size, that can lead to groups of over 150 individuals, and variation in abundance. This led him to study nutritional ecology, disease ecology, and to document long-term change. It was his friendship with Tom Struhsaker from Duke University and the extensive data that encompassed research from 1970 to 1987 that really lead Dr. Chapman to quantify long-term patterns. This data became invaluable when globally researchers became aware of climate change and the fact that old growth forests were much more dynamic than previously believed.

== Ecological Constraints Model ==
Chapman has worked on issues dealing with understanding animal group size and composition since his Ph.D. and formalized the Ecological Constraints Model. The ideas are relatively simple. Various researchers have suggested that grouping confers such predictable benefits that differences in group size can be explained by the disadvantages. The most widely accepted potential cost of grouping is thought to be a reduction in foraging efficiency. Being with other individuals with the same dietary requirements means that animals either fight over food, or one animal in a group beats another to the food, thus when the second animal comes to an area there is simply no food left. In both of these situations it is thought that competition over food leads to animals having to travel farther as the size of the group increases. The logic behind this argument is relatively simple. Animals must forage over an area that can meet their energetic and nutritional requirements. It follows that an increase in group size will increase the area that must be covered to find adequate food supplies. Thus individuals must travel further and expend more energy if they are in a large group, than if they forage in a smaller group. With an increase in the time spent traveling, a point is approached where the energy spent in travel is too costly and smaller groups become advantageous. In this way ecological factors can influence movement patterns and foraging efficiency, thereby constraining the size of groups that can efficiently exploit available food resources. These ideas have been formalized in what has become known as the Ecological Constraints Model and have been shown to predict group size in a variety of primates and other species.

The Ecological Constraint Model has been found to be supported in different primate species with a variety of diet, such as, chimpanzees (Pan troglodytes), spider monkeys (Ateles geoffroyi), red colobus (Procolobus pennantii), red-tailed guenon (Cercopithecus ascanius), and ursine colobus monkeys (Colobus vellerosus).

== Links between conservation and health: Kibale Mobile Clinic ==
Tropical forests are some of the most beautiful and biodiverse ecosystem on the face of the planet, yet they are gravely threatened. Recent global assessments report that 2.3 million km^{2} of forest was lost between 2000 and 2012 and in the tropics forest loss increased by 2101 km^{2} per year. Ultimately, changes in forest cover are driven by increased human population size and natural resource consumption rates. In African countries with tropical forest, human population density increased from 8 people per km^{2} in 1950 to 35 people per km^{2} in 2010. This increasingly dire situation not only threatens biodiversity, but it is clear that extreme poverty and this rapid loss of biodiversity are intimately linked, with extreme poverty and biodiversity hotspots being geographically coincident. The people living next to tropical protected areas are some of the poorest people in the world and suffer from often acute health problems. For example, in Uganda the country that Chapman has worked in for the last 27+ years, 30% of all deaths among children between the ages of 2 and 4 are caused by malaria, a disease that could be easily treated or prevented; and 26% of children under the age of five are malnourished. This situation means that for effective conservation to occur the local community must be involved, which often means they receive benefits. Chapman has implemented systems that link health provision and conservation. Receiving money or employment from the park is definitely beneficial and appreciated, but saving the life of a young child suffering from malaria is enormous and its benefit unmeasurable to the parent. Chapman, first established a clinic to meet the health needs of the local people and subsequently since Kibale is large and many people could not travel to the clinic, he brought an ambulance from Canada to Kibale to act as a mobile clinic. The Mobile Health Clinic travels around the park, bringing basic health care, family planning, deworming, HIV/AIDS treatment and counselling, vaccinations, and health and conservation education to remote villagers. The staff also provide public talks on disease prevention. Chapman has taken this sort of approach of working with the local community to help them obtain the needs they identify, while still administering strict wildlife protection in all of his conservation efforts.
