= David Chapman (British sport shooter) =

British sports shooter

Personal information
- Nationality: British
- Born: 30 October 1963 (age 61); Hitchin, England

Sport
- Sport: Sports shooting

David Chapman (born 30 October 1963) is a British sports shooter. He competed at the 1984 Summer Olympics and the 1992 Summer Olympics.
