= Vernon Chapman =

English association football player

Personal information
- Date of birth: 9 May 1921
- Place of birth: Leicester, England
- Date of death: 6 June 2006 (aged 85)
- Place of death: Leicester, England
- Position: Winger

Senior career*
Years	Team	Apps	(Gls)
19xx–1941	Bath City		
1941–1947	Leicester City	1	(0)
1947–1949	Leyton Orient	31	(7)
1953–1959	Tamworth		

Managerial career
- 1958–1961: Tamworth
- * Club domestic league appearances and goals

Vernon Chapman (9 May 1921 – 6 June 2006) was an English footballer who played in the Football League as a winger for Leicester City and Leyton Orient. He went on to play for and then manage Tamworth, initially as player-manager.

Chapman died on 6 June 2006 in Leicester, England at the age of 85.

== Managerial Statistics ==
Team	Nat	From	To	Record							
Team	Nat	From	To	P	W	D	L	GF	GA	GD	W%
Tamworth	(England)	3 February 1958	28 July 1961	154	68	30	56	265	239	+26	44.2
Total				154	68	30	56	265	239	+26	44.2
