= Charles Chapman =

Charles Chapman may refer to:

== Entertainment ==
- Charles Chapman (guitarist) (1950/1951–2011), American guitarist
- Charles Shepard Chapman (1879–1962), American painter
- C. H. Chapman (Charles Henry Chapman, 1879–1972), British illustrator and cartoonist
- C.C. Chapman (Charles Chapman), podcaster

== Sports ==
- Charles Chapman (cricketer, born 1806) (1806–1892), English cricketer
- Charles Chapman (rugby union) (1860–1901), English international rugby union player and cricketer
- Charles Frederic Chapman (1881–1976), boater, author, editor of Motor Boating magazine
- Chuck Chapman (Charles Chapman, 1911–2002), Canadian basketball player
- Charles Chapman (swimmer), first black swimmer to swim across the English Channel, 1981
- Charlie Chapman (Australian footballer) (1905–1978), Australian rules footballer
- Charlie Chapman (rugby union) (born 1998), English rugby union player

== Military ==
- Charles Chapman (British Army officer) (died 1795), commander-in-chief, India
- Charles Chapman (RFC officer) (1887–1917), British World War I flying ace
- Charles Chapman (MP) (1752–1809), English East India officer and Member of Parliament for Newtown, Isle of Wight

== Politics ==
- Charles Chapman (Connecticut politician) (1799–1869), U.S. representative from Connecticut
- Charles R. Chapman (1827–1897), mayor of Hartford, Connecticut
- Charles Chapman (mayor) (1853–1944), mayor of Fullerton, California
- Charles Chapman (New Zealand politician) (1876–1957), politician of the Labour Party
- Charles Robert Chapman (1847–1928), mayor of Dunedin

== Other ==
- Charles Chapman (engineer) (1897–1979), invented the high speed diesel engine (for automobiles)
- Charles "Pop" Chapman (1874–1955), Australian gold prospector, businessman, and newspaper publisher
- Charles Henry Chapman (academic) (1870–1934), American academic

== See also ==
- Charles Chapman Grafton (1830–1912), bishop of the Diocese of Fond du Lac
