= Chapman Hump =

Nunatak in Palmer Land, Antarctica

Chapman Hump (70°13′S 67°30′W) is a large rounded nunatak in the center of Chapman Glacier in Palmer Land, located 10 nautical miles (20 km) inland from George VI Sound. It was named by the UK Antarctic Place-Names Committee in association with Chapman Glacier.
