= Prehospital Emergency Care =

- Discipline: Pre-hospital emergency medicine
- Language: English
- Edited by: Jane H. Brice

Publication details
- History: 1997 to present
- Publisher: Taylor & Francis (United Kingdom)
- Frequency: Bimonthly
- Open access: Hybrid
- Impact factor: 2.0 (2024)

Standard abbreviations
- ISO 4: Prehosp. Emerg. Care

Indexing
- ISSN: 1090-3127 (print); 1545-0066 (web)
- LCCN: sn96-2682
- OCLC no.: 35252987

Links
- Journal homepage

Prehospital Emergency Care is a peer-reviewed medical journal covering pre-hospital emergency medicine and emergency medical services. Established in 1997, it is published bimonthly by Taylor & Francis as the official journal of the National Association of EMS Physicians, the National Association of State EMS Officials, the National Association of EMS Educators, the National Association of Emergency Medical Technicians, the National Registry of Emergency Medical Technicians, and the National EMS Management Association.

== Editor-in-chief ==
As of 2026, the editor-in-chief is Jane H. Brice (University of North Carolina at Chapel Hill).

== Abstracting and indexing ==
The journal is abstracted and indexed in CINAHL, Embase, Scopus, PubMed/MEDLINE, the Science Citation Index Expanded, and Web of Science. According to the publisher, the journal had a 2024 impact factor of 2.0.
