= Michael Chapman =

Michael Chapman or Mike Chapman may refer to:

- Mike Chapman (born 1947), Australian record producer and songwriter
- Michael Chapman (bassoonist) (1934–2005), British classical bassoonist and reed-maker
- Michael Chapman (cinematographer) (1935–2020), American cinematographer
- Mike Chapman (politician) (born 1963), member of the Washington State House of Representatives
- Michael Chapman (singer) (1941–2021), English singer-songwriter and guitarist
- Michael Chapman (lawyer), American lawyer
- Michael Chapman (Missouri politician), Director of Homeland Security for the State of Missouri
- Mike Chapman (cartoonist) (born 1973), American animator, part of The Brothers Chaps
- Michael Chapman (Australian politician) (1822–1906), member of the New South Wales Legislative Assembly
- Michael Chapman (priest) (1939–2019), Archdeacon of Northampton
- Michael L. Chapman (born 1957), American law enforcement executive
