= Edmund Chapman =

English surgeon and midwife

- Occupations: Surgeon and midwife

Edmund Chapman (fl. 1733) was an English surgeon and man-midwife.

== Biography ==
Chapman was a country practitioner, commenced midwifery practice about 1708. In 1733 he was in practice in Drake Street, Red Lion Square, London, and published 'An Essay on the Improvement of Midwifery, chiefly with regard to the Operation, to which are added Fifty Cases, selected from upwards of Twenty-five Years' Practice.' He was one of the earliest systematic writers on this subject in England, and published as much as he could discover of Hugh Chamberlen's (concealed) methods of delivery with the forceps. A second edition appeared in 1735, entitled 'A Treatise,' &c., with large additions. In 1737 Chapman replied in a pamphlet to some criticisms made by Douglas in his 'Short Account of the State of Midwifery in London and Westminster.' The dates of his birth and death are not known.
