= Mary Chapman =

British businesswoman

Mary Chapman was the Chief Executive of the Chartered Management Institute in the UK from 1998 to 2012.

== Biography ==
Mary Chapman is a Chartered Director who, since 2008, has served as a non-executive board member for public organisations including the Royal Mint Ltd, the National Lottery Commission, the Gambling Commission and Brunel University London. She chaired the Institute of Customer Service from 2009 to 2015 and was a trustee of the Girls' Day School Trust for 10 years. She is currently a member and the Audit Committee Chair of the Archbishops' Council of the Church of England, as well as Chair of the General Chiropractic Council. She has recently been appointed to the West London Health Research Ethics Committee.

== Career history ==
Mary was Chief Executive of the Chartered Management Institute and Chair of CMI Enterprises from 1998 to 2008; Chief Executive of Investors in People UK between 1993 and 1998 and Marketing Director/Personnel Director/General Manager of companies within the L'OREAL Group for twelve years up to 1993.

== Education ==
Mary holds a BA (Hons) in French and German from Bristol University; an honorary doctorate from Sheffield Hallam University; the diploma of the Chartered Institute of Marketing; a diploma in Business Management from the Centre Europeen d'Etudes Permanents; and the diploma in Company Direction from the Institute of Directors.
