= Wayne Chapman =

Wayne Chapman may refer to:

- Wayne Chapman (American football) (1937–2017), American football player and coach
- Wayne Chapman (basketball) (born 1945), American former professional basketball player
