= Alger Chapman =

American lawyer

Alger Baldwin Chapman
- Born: November 2, 1904
- Died: November 3, 1983 (aged 79)
- Education: Williams College; Columbia University
- Known for: CEO of Beech-Nut Life Savers

Alger Baldwin Chapman (November 2, 1904 - November 3, 1983) was an attorney, businessman, New York state official, and adviser to New York Governor Thomas Dewey. Chapman was involved in Republican politics in New York, and managed several campaigns in the state.

Chapman was born in 1904 on Long Island; he attended law school at Columbia University. After a brief stint of public service, he became a partner in a New York law firm. In 1945, Dewey appointed him to the tax commission, a position from which he resigned to run Dewey's 1946 reelection bid, and to which he was reappointed by the reelected governor.

Chapman was the New York manager for Dewey's unsuccessful presidential bid, and remained involved in Republican politics until the age of 70. After leaving state government in the early 1950s, he entered the corporate world, heading one corporation and holding directorships in others. He died in 1983.

== Early life ==
Born on November 2, 1904 in Hempstead, New York, Chapman attended Williams College and Columbia Law School, from which he graduated in 1930. While still in law school, he married his first wife, the former Elizabeth Ives, by whom he had four children. One of his children, Alger Chapman Jr. became the CEO of both the investment bank Shearson, Hammill & Co. and the financial exchange Chicago Board Options Exchange. After serving two years as an attorney in the office of the Legislative Counsel to the United States Senate, he became a partner in the Washington, D.C. firm of Alvord & Alvord. In 1939, he was put in charge of its New York office.

== Dewey and politics ==
In 1945, Governor Dewey named Chapman State Tax Commissioner. Dewey and Chapman had met only briefly, but after inquiry, Governor Dewey learned that Chapman was eminently qualified for the job, if he was willing to take it. When, the following year, Governor Dewey named Chapman to a highway commission, he was so impressed at how smoothly the meeting had gone that he appointed Chapman, who had no political experience., as his campaign manager in 1946. Chapman resigned from his tax post to manage Dewey's successful campaign, and the newly reelected governor reappointed him after the election, and he served in that position until he resigned in 1948 to return to the law.

Chapman followed up his success by acting as the New York manager for Dewey's 1948 Presidential bid, and succeeded in garnering New York's 47 electoral votes for Dewey, though the ticket was defeated nationwide. He was unsuccessful in managing John Foster Dulles's 1949 Senate bid against former governor Herbert Lehman but was successful in managing Dewey's 1950 bid for a third term and in securing New York for Dwight Eisenhower in 1952 and 1956. He served as state treasurer for the Republicans from 1949 to 1959, and would serve on its finance committee in 1974.

== Businessman ==
In 1958, Chapman became chairman and chief executive officer of Beech-Nut Life Savers Inc., which merged with E. R. Squibb and Sons Inc., later becoming the Squibb Corporation. Chapman remained a director of Squibb after the merger, and also served as a director of ABC, the Bowery Savings Bank and the Bank of New York. He was involved in civic activities, for nine years chairing the board of trustees of Adelphi University and was also involved with the YMCA and the Police Athletic League. He died in 1983 in New York City.
