= Lloyd Chapman =

American activist

- Born: 1949 (age 76–77); Texas, US
- Occupations: Lawyer; activist
- Title: President of the American Small Business League
- Website: asbl.com

Lloyd Alan Chapman (born 1949) is a lawyer and small business activist. In 2004, he founded the American Small Business League, an advocacy group for which he is chief executive officer (CEO).

== Early life and career ==
Chapman was born 1949, in Texas. He began his career by working for Texas political leader Bob Bullock and worked for eight years in the Texas Controller's office. In 1986, he relocated to California to pursue opportunities in the computer industry. It was during this period that Chapman became aware of significant challenges in federal small business contracting programs, prompting him to become an advocate for small technology firms. He actively monitored federal "set-aside" contracts for small businesses and his efforts led to a 1991 congressional investigation concerning the Lockheed Martin F-22 Raptor. This investigation resulted in the allocation of an additional $501 million to small and minority-owned firms by the Air Force and Lockheed Martin.

== Federal small business contracting and advocacy ==
Chapman's work highlighted the requirement for the federal government to allocate a fair portion (currently 23%) of its contracts to small businesses. However, numerous federal investigations and private studies have revealed instances where large companies were inaccurately reported as recipients of federal small business awards. Chapman has persistently pursued litigation to access information regarding small business utilization in government contracts. Notably, in 1993, the U.S. Court of Appeals for the 9th Circuit ruled against the Defense Logistics Agency, compelling the release of vital information documenting small business contracting awards. This ruling shed light on the lack of enforcement of congressionally mandated small business goals, paving the way for increased participation of small businesses in federal contracting.

In 2003, Chapman's contributions prompted a Government Accountability Office (GAO) investigation that confirmed the awarding of small business contracts to some of the world's largest corporations, directly contradicting the Small Business Act of 1953. To advocate for fair policies in federal small business contracting, Chapman established a trade group called the Micro Industry Suppliers Association in 2003. The organization's name was later changed to the American Small Business League in 2004 to accommodate the inclusion of businesses beyond the computer industry.

== Noteworthy accomplishments ==
In 2006, Chapman achieved several significant milestones through federal lawsuits filed under freedom of information legislation. These lawsuits exposed instances of fraud and abuse in federal small business contracting:

- The first lawsuit forced the SBA to release documentation that showed the agency had ignored protests that were filed by small businesses against large corporations.
- The second forced the SBA to release the name of the firm that the SBA Inspector General had recommended be debarred from government contracting for federal small business contracting fraud.
- The third forced NASA to release information that showed the agency has been reporting awards to Fortune 500 corporations as federal small business awards.

Furthermore, during that year, Chapman:

- Provided information leading to a Fortune 1000 firm being fined $1 million for falsely claiming to be a small business, which had unlawfully received around $36 million in federal small business contracts.
- Organized a successful grassroots effort to challenge unfair policies in federal small business contracting, resulting in over 700 comments sent by ASBL members to the General Services Administration in protest of new policies that would create loopholes in small business procurement programs.
- Revealed the government's attempts to conceal small business contracting information, obstructing access to the truth for watchdog groups and the media.
- Highlighted the SBA's failure to implement the women's procurement program for over five years, causing women-owned firms to miss out on billions of dollars in contracting opportunities.
- Engaged in a debate on BusinessWeek.com with former SBA Administrator Hector Barreto regarding the accuracy of the SBA's reported small business contracting figures. Barreto subsequently resigned amid controversy.
- Exposed Republican efforts to close the SBA and terminate all federal programs for small, women-owned, minority-owned, and disabled veteran-owned firms.
- Brought attention to the fact that the government has not penalized any firm that misrepresented its size status to obtain federal small business contracts.
- Advocated alongside the SBA Inspector General for annual small business size certification to prevent fraud and abuse in small business procurement programs. Currently, SBA policy allows firms to maintain their size status for up to 20 years.
- Led an ongoing media campaign that generated over 200 articles in print and online publications, as well as radio and television coverage, addressing federal small business contracting issues.
