= Nigel Chapman (cricketer) =

English cricketer

Nigel Chapman (born 31 May 1945 (age 79)) was an English cricketer. He was a left-handed batsman and wicket-keeper who played for Oxfordshire. He was born in Bishop's Stortford.

Having represented Essex in the Second XI Championship between 1963 and 1969, and having played Minor Counties Championship matches for Oxfordshire between 1971 and 1974, Chapman made a single List A appearance for the side, during the 1975 Gillette Cup, against Cornwall. From the upper-middle order, he scored 9 runs.
