= Judy Jean Chapman =

American nursing educator

- Born: Judy Jean Cox; November 18, 1941; Nashville, Tennessee, U.S.
- Died: September 8, 2025 (age 83)
- Occupations: Nurse, nursing professor

Judy Jean Cox Chapman (November 18, 1941 – September 8, 2025) was an American nurse and college professor. She taught in Vanderbilt University's schools of nursing and medicine from 1966 to 2001.

== Early life and education ==
Cox was born in Nashville, Tennessee, the daughter of Major Eugene Cox Jr. and Julia Galbreath Cox. She earned a bachelor's degree in nursing at Vanderbilt University in 1963, graduating first in her class, and a master's degree from the University of Florida in 1966.

== Career ==
Chapman was a professor of maternal and child nursing at Vanderbilt University School of Nursing from 1966 to 2001; she was also the nursing school's interim dean in 1982 and 1983. She was clinical consultant on a textbook, Perinatal Nursing (1977). She also taught in the Department of Emergency Medicine at Vanderbilt University School of Medicine. The Chapmans were honored by almost a thousand attendees at a black-tie dinner in Nashville when they retired from Vanderbilt in 2001. In 2008, she attended the Vanderbilt nursing program's centennial celebrations. She was president of the Planned Parenthood Association of Nashville.

== Publications ==
Chapman's scholarship was published in journals including Nurse Educator, Pediatrics, Journal of Medical Education, Nursing Research, Journal of Emergency Medicine, Health Care Management Review, Academic Emergency Medicine, and Prehospital Emergency Care.

- "Microteaching: How Students Learn Group Patient Education Skills" (1978)
- "Further Observations on Noise Levels in Infant Incubators" (1979, with Fred H. Bess and Barbara Finlayson Peek)
- "The role of the medical school dean's wife: Report of a study" (1980, with Michael Miller)
- "Use of Data Base Microcomputer Software in Descriptive Nursing Research" (1985)
- "Concerns of Breast-Feeding Mothers from Birth to 4 Months" (1985, with Mary Jane Macey, Mary Keegan, Peggy Borum, and Sandra Bennett)
- "Information on Spouses of Health Care Leaders" (1986)
- "The acting or interim leadership position: Expectations, perceptions, realities" (1988, with John E. Chapman and John O. Lostetter)
- "Do fireservice paramedics (EMT-P) seek follow-up medical information about patients brought to a level I trauma center?" (1997)
- "Emergency Medical Services and the Medical School Curriculum" (1997)
- "Impact of EMS education on emergency medicine ability and career choices of medical students" (1999, with Steven J. Weiss, Mary Lou Haynes, and Amy A. Ernst)

== Personal life ==
Cox married Vanderbilt medical school dean John E. Chapman in 1968. He died in 2004, and she died in 2025, at the age of 83. There is a teaching award in Vanderbilt's Department of Emergency Medicine, and a quadrangle at Vanderbilt, both named for the Chapmans.
