= Jim Chapman =

Jim Chapman may refer to:

- Jim Chapman (congressman) (born 1945), American businessman and politician
  - Jim Chapman Lake, a lake in Texas named after the politician
- Jim Chapman (footballer) (born 1965), Scottish footballer
- Jim Chapman (YouTuber), YouTuber and blogger
- Jim Chapman (media personality) (born 1949), Canadian radio and TV personality, musician, journalist and author
- Jim Chapman (American football) (born 1935), American football coach
- Jim Chapman (Resident Evil), fictional character

== See also ==
- James Chapman (disambiguation)
