= James Chapman (cricketer) =

English cricketer

James Chapman (born 19 May 1986) was an English cricketer. Born in Nottingham, he was a left-handed batsman and a right-arm medium-pace bowler who played for Derbyshire in 2004.

Derbyshire were to offer him a two-year contract, after the selectors saw enough in the young bowler before signing professionally.

He only achieved one first-class innings in his career and was released in 2005. However, he played extensively for the Second XI side between his 2003 debut, and Derbyshire's consecutive eleventh-placed seasons of 2004 and 2005, picking up a career best of 97* against Lancashire.
