= George Chapman (healer) =

George Chapman (4 February 1921 – 9 August 2006) was an English medium and spiritual healer. Active for 60 years, he was a medium for the spirit of "Dr. Lang", who conducted "spirit operations" on patients.

Chapman was born in Bootle, near Liverpool on 4 February 1921, and was brought up by his maternal grandparents after the early death of his mother. After leaving school he took up various manual occupations, became a professional boxer, and, during World War II, served in the Irish Guards and the RAF. He joined the Aylesbury Fire Brigade after being demobbed, a post he held until 1956.

Chapman married Margaret May Dickinson and they had a daughter, Vivian, in 1945, who survived only 4 weeks. The couple were devastated by her premature death, but claimed to have received "spirit messages" from her through the use of a ouija board.

Chapman worked as a medium, it was alleged he channeled spirit guides with names such Ram-a-din-i and Chang Woo. His main spirit guide was a doctor called William Lang (1852-1937) who had been an ophthalmic surgeon at London's Middlesex Hospital up until 1914.

George Chapman died on 9 August 2006.
