= Alger Chapman Jr. =

American businessman (1931–2013)

Alger "Duke" Chapman Jr.
- Born: September 28, 1931; Portland, Maine
- Died: February 18, 2013 (aged 81); Little Rock, Arkansas
- Education: Williams College; Columbia Law School
- Known for: CEO of Shearson, Hammill & Co. Chairman and CEO of the Chicago Board Options Exchange

Alger "Duke" Chapman Jr. was the President and CEO of Shearson, Hammill & Co. and Chairman and CEO of the Chicago Board Options Exchange from 1986 to 1997.

== Early life and career ==
Chapman was born to Alger Baldwin Chapman and the former Elizabeth Libby Ives on September 28, 1931, in Portland, Maine. He graduated from Williams College and Columbia University.

He worked at the Securities and Exchange Commission and then at the New York Stock Exchange, where he was a Vice President. he then joined Shearson Hammill in 1966. He rose to become president and CEO of Shearson Hammill, eventually merging the company with Hayden, Stone & Co. He stayed with the company and its successor. In 1986, he became chairman and CEO of the Chicago Board Options Exchange. After quitting in 1997, Chapman joined ABN Amro where he remained until his retirement in 2004.
