= Chapman, Montana =

Unincorporated community in Montana, United States

Coordinates: 48°52′07″N 108°07′59″W

Chapman is an unincorporated community in Phillips County, in the U.S. state of Montana.

== History ==
A post office was established at Chapman in 1929, and remained in operation until it was discontinued in 1955. The community was named for A. P. Chapman, a railroad agent.
