= Chapman, West Virginia =

Unincorporated community in West Virginia, United States

Chapman
- Unincorporated community
- Location within the state of West Virginia Chapman (the United States)
- Coordinates: 38°32′42″N 80°27′38″W
- Country: United States
- State: West Virginia
- County: Webster
- Elevation: 1,467 ft (447 m)
- Time zone: UTC-5 (Eastern (EST))
  - Summer (DST): UTC-4 (EDT)
- GNIS ID: 1554109

Chapman is an unincorporated community in Webster County, West Virginia, United States.
