= Colin Chapman (cricketer) =

English cricketer

Colin Chapman (born Colin Anthony Chapman; 8 June 1971, in Bradford, Yorkshire, England) was an English wicket-keeper and a right-handed batsman for Yorkshire.

He played eight first-class cricket matches in his career, which was hampered by Yorkshire preferring Richard Blakey. A decent batsman in his own right, Chapman scored 238 runs, with a highest score of 80 at an average of 21.63. He took thirteen catches behind the stumps and completed three stumpings.

He played 10 List A matches, scoring 94 runs at an average of 31.33, with a top score of 36 not out.
