= Horace Chapman =

Horace Chapman may refer to:

- Horace Chapman (politician) (1811–1884), American lawyer and politician
- Horace Chapman (cricketer) (1890–1941), South African cricketer
- Horace Chapman (tennis) (1866–1937), British tennis player
