= Billy Chapman (footballer) =

English footballer

William Chapman (21 September 1902 – 2 December 1967) was an English footballer, born in Murton, County Durham. His regular position was as an outside right, and during his career Chapman played in the Football League for Sheffield Wednesday, Manchester United and Watford. Chapman and Tommy Barnett both moved from Manchester United to Watford at the end of the 1927–28 season, and spent the next six seasons playing together on Watford's right wing. He made 233 appearances for Watford in all competitions, scoring 10 goals.
