= Royal Norton Chapman =

American entomologist

Royal Norton Chapman (17 September 1889 – 2 December 1939) was an American entomologist who studied insect ecology. He was one of the pioneers of quantitative ecology, with his extensive experimental studies on the population dynamics of Tribolium beetles. His textbook Insect Ecology (1931) was a landmark in ecological entomology.

== Life and work ==
Chapman was born in Morristown, Minnesota, of Anglo-Dutch ancestry. He joined Pillsbury Academy after schooling in Iowa, Nebraska and Minnesota. He received a BA in 1914 and an MA in 1915 from the University of Minnesota, working on the life history of Agrilus bilineatus under the supervision of A.G. Ruggles, after which he joined Cornell University for his doctorate under John Henry Comstock. He then joined the University of Minnesota to work on quantitative ecology of insects. In 1925 he became a head of the division of entomology and economic zoology at the university. He worked on applied entomology research, working on pests in pineapple in Hawaii and became a dean of the school of tropical agriculture at the University of Hawaii from 1931 till his return to Minnesota in 1939. His most influential work was on the dynamics of Tribolium confusum beetles which he studied in experimental set ups. This would later make the beetles model organisms in population ecology and contributed to progress in mathematical models in population ecology. He corresponded with Vito Volterra on his population studies. Among his ideas, was the formula inspired by Ohm's law that there was a biotic potential and a resistance from the environment to the growth of populations of organisms - C = B_{p}/R, where C was the concentration of insects, B_{p} the "biotic potential" of the species and R the environmental resistance to population growth.
