= Cornelius Chapman =

British comedian

Mr Cornelius Chapman

Cornelius' Album 'Biscuits at Balmoral'

Mr Cornelius Chapman is a cult poet, songsmith, writer and performer who found fame through the much celebrated "The Gentleman's Club" radio show on London's Resonance FM and later via his numerous recordings for Xfm and Virgin Radio DJ Christian O'Connell.

Although The Gentleman's Club members went their separate ways back in 2004, Cornelius continues to write and record via his website at www.corneliuschapman.com.

Highlights of Cornelius' back catalogue include:

- 21st Century Diaries: A continuous quest to lead the gentlemanly lifestyle in modern times.

- Mr Tweed: Cornelius' first endeavour into the world of Children's story telling.

- Memoirs: Finally, the Chapman memoirs (or at least volume I) are available as read by the great man

- Biscuits at Balmoral: A compilation of the greatest tunes from Cornelius including "Let's Win it for the Queen" and "Cup of Tea"

In 2006 Cornelius finally succumbed to the lure of technology and abandoned the quill in favour of his Blog, also available from www.corneliuschapman.com.
