= Charlotte Chapman =

American-born British stage actress

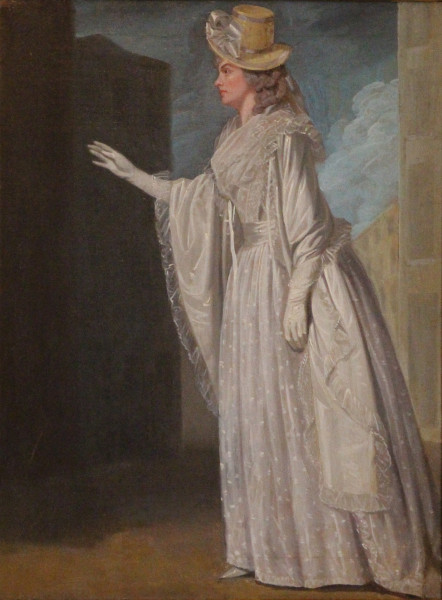
Chapman painted by Samuel De Wilde.

Charlotte Jane Chapman (1762–1805) was an American-born British stage actress. Her father was ruined during the American War of Independence and sent his daughter to live with relatives in England. Her early roles on stage came in York, where she married an actor named Morton and briefly acted under that name before separating from him and returning to her maid name. She appeared at the Theatre Royal, Margate in the summer of 1788 and was then hired by the manager Thomas Harris to join the company of the Theatre Royal, Covent Garden in London. She remained with the company until 1804, becoming a major member of troupe known generally for her roles in comedies. She interspersed this with summer appearances at other theatres including in Margate, Ireland and the Haymarket. She was buried at St Paul's in Covent Garden, known for its association with actor. She was painted twice by the artist Samuel De Wilde.

== Bibliography ==
- Highfill, Philip H, Burnim, Kalman A. & Langhans, Edward A. A Biographical Dictionary of Actors, Actresses, Musicians, Dancers, Managers and Other Stage Personnel in London, 1660-1800: Cabanel to Cory. SIU Press, 1975.
- Seilhamer, George Oberkirsh History of the American Theatre: New foundations 1792-1797. Globe Printing House, 1891.
