= John Chapman (artist) =

English painter (born 1946)

John L. Chapman
- Born: 1946 (age 79–80); Blackburn, Lancashire, England
- Known for: Painting
- Website: www.johnchapman.co.uk

John L. Chapman (born 1946 in Blackburn, Lancashire, England) is a painter of urban landscapes, townscapes, transport, rural and maritime scenes amongst other subjects. He has painted mainly in acrylics, but he is equally proficient with oils, watercolours and gouache.

Many of Chapman's paintings have been reproduced as limited edition prints and he has also completed several commissions for Josiah Wedgwood and Sons. In 2003, a book John Chapman's Lancashire was published by Halsgrove

== Biography ==
Chapman attended Bangor Street School in Blackburn, where his art teacher, Peter Shackleton, recognised his talent and arranged for him to take art classes at Blackburn College of Art on Saturday mornings. During his time at school, Chapman developed an interest in trains and the railway art of Terence Cuneo and others. After leaving school in 1961, Chapman was employed as a layout artist and later as a technical illustrator working on his own paintings in the evenings and at weekends.

In 1968 Chapman became an independent, professional artist making his first sales of railway paintings and receiving commissions for specific subjects in oils. Major exhibitions soon followed at W. H. Patterson's gallery in Mayfair and at public galleries in his native Lancashire.

In 1984, one of John's paintings was exhibited in the Royal Academy's Summer Exhibition.
