= Mary Francis Chapman =

British novelist

Mary Francis Chapman (28 November 1838 – 18 February 1884) was a British novelist.

== Life ==
Chapman was born at Dublin, where her father held a position in the custom house. He was soon transferred to the London customs, and his family came with him to England, so his daughter was placed at a school at Staplehurst in Kent. She early displayed an aptitude for story-writing, and part of her first novel, Mary Bertrand, she composed at the age of fifteen. It was published in 1856, when she was only eighteen.

This was followed by Lord Bridgnorth's Niece, which appeared in 1862. In 1869 she contributed to the Churchman's Family Magazine an historical tale, called "Bellasis; or, the Fortunes of a Cavalier", which was the joint production of herself and her father.

A visit to Scotland, where her elder brother had settled as a clergyman of the Scottish Episcopal Church, led to her writing, in 1876, A Scotch Wooing, the first of her books that attracted attention. In 1876, appeared her best novel, Gerald Marlowe's wife. Her last work, published in 1879, was The Gift of the Gods. This appeared under her own name; in her previous publications she had used the pseudonyms of 'Francis Meredith' and 'J. C. Ayrton.'

Chapman died, after a long illness, at Old Charlton, on 18 February 1884.

Her novels are, with the exception of Bellasis, tales of domestic life, with comparatively little incident, but marked by good feeling and refined taste. Her chief gifts were said to be an unusual power of writing easy and natural dialogue.
