= David Chapman (cricketer) =

English cricketer and clergyman

Personal information
- Full name: David Macklin Braby Chapman
- Born: 12 September 1855; St. Paul, Rupert's Land, Canada
- Died: 24 March 1934 (aged 78); Hailsham, Sussex, England

Domestic team information
- Years: Team
- 1876–1877: Cambridge University

Career statistics
Competition	First-class
Matches	2
Runs scored	7
Batting average	1.75
100s/50s	0/0
Top score	5
Balls bowled	260
Wickets	4
Bowling average	32.00
5 wickets in innings	0
10 wickets in match	0
Best bowling	3/56
Catches/stumpings	0/–
- Source: CricketArchive, 14 October 2011

David Macklin Braby Chapman (12 September 1855 – 24 March 1934) was a first-class cricketer. He was born at St. Paul's, Red River Colony, Rupert's Land (now part of Manitoba, Canada) and died at Hailsham, East Sussex, England.

David Chapman was educated at Corpus Christi College, Cambridge. He played two matches for Cambridge University in 1876–77. He later became ordained a clergyman, and was Vicar of Tonbridge from 1901 to 1931.
