= Frederick Chapman (sportsman) =

Australian rules footballer (1901–1964)

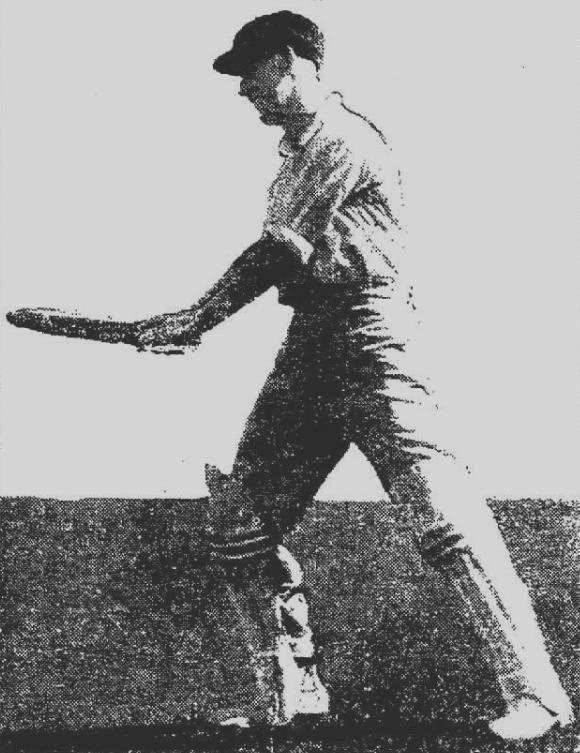

Personal information
- Full name: Frederick Douglas Chapman
- Born: 21 March 1901; North Fitzroy, Victoria
- Died: 27 June 1964 (aged 63); Northcote, Victoria
- Batting: Right-handed
- Bowling: Right-arm medium

Domestic team information
- Years: Team
- 1928/29–1930/31: Victoria

Career statistics
Competition	First-class
Matches	4
Runs scored	94
Batting average	13.42
100s/50s	0/0
Top score	33
Balls bowled	547
Wickets	7
Bowling average	28.00
5 wickets in innings	0
10 wickets in match	0
Best bowling	4/69
Catches/stumpings	0/–
- Source: CricketArchive, 31 December 2014

Frederick Douglas Chapman (21 March 1901 – 27 June 1964) was an Australian sportsman who played first-class cricket with Victoria and Australian rules football for Fitzroy in the Victorian Football League (VFL).

Chapman played two games at Fitzroy, one each in the 1920 and 1921 VFL seasons, before going to Coburg. As a cricketer he bowled right-arm medium pace and took seven wickets at 28.00 from his four first-class matches. Five of those wickets came in a match against Tasmania at the Melbourne Cricket Ground in 1930/31 and included a haul of 4/69 in the second innings.
