= Fred Chapman (baseball) =

American baseball player (1916-1997)

- Shortstop
- Born: July 17, 1916; Liberty, South Carolina, U.S.
- Died: March 27, 1997 (aged 80); Kannapolis, North Carolina, U.S.
- Batted: Right Threw: Right

MLB debut
- September 15, 1939, for the Philadelphia Athletics

Last MLB appearance
- September 23, 1941, for the Philadelphia Athletics

MLB statistics
- Batting average: .193
- Home runs: 0
- Runs batted in: 9
- Stats at Baseball Reference

Teams
- Philadelphia Athletics (1939–41)

William Fred Chapman (July 17, 1916 – March 27, 1997) was an American professional baseball player. He played parts of three seasons in Major League Baseball, from 1939 until 1941, for the Philadelphia Athletics, primarily as a shortstop.
