= Samuel Belcher Chapman =

English philanthropist

Samuel Belcher Chapman (1800, Eastbourne, Sussex- June 1880, Ipswich) was an English philanthropist who dedicated himself to supporting the St Matthews Industrial Home for Girls in Ipswich, Suffolk. Following a brief period in partnership with Henry Biddell in London, Chapman moved to Ipswich in 1830 and by October 1831, he had received the credentials from Apothecaries' Hall, London to practice as chemist and druggist. He then set up in business first in Tavern Street, moving to Cornhill by 1832.

In 1851 Chapman retired from active participation in his business and then devoted himself to running the Girls' Home he established in 1857 until his death in June 1880.

Chapman Lane, Ipswich is named after Samuel Belcher Chapman and is located near the former site of the Industrial Home for Girls in Black Horse Lane.
