= Frederick William Chapman =

American minister

Rev. Frederick William Chapman
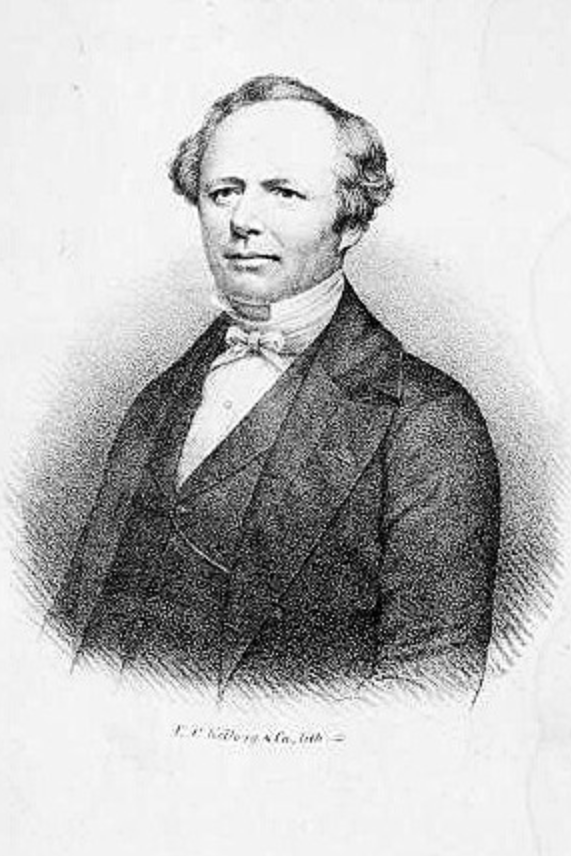
- Undated photo by Kellogg & Co.

Personal life
- Born: November 17, 1806 Canfield, Ohio, U.S.
- Died: July 20, 1876 (aged 69) Rocky Hill, Connecticut, U.S.
- Spouse: Emily Westbrook (m. 1833; died 1854); Caroline Strickland Crooks (m. 1855)
- Children: 3
- Education: Divinity School of Yale College
- Pen name: F. W. Chapman
- Occupation: minister; educator; genealogist
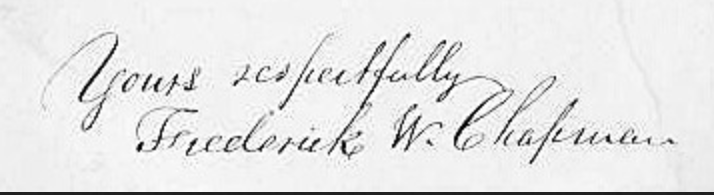
- Signature

Religious life
- Religion: Christianity
- Denomination: Congregational
- Ordination: September 5, 1832

Senior posting
- Based in: Connecticut

Frederick William Chapman (pen name, F. W. Chapman; November 17, 1806 – July 20, 1876) was an American Congregational minister, educator, and genealogist who preached in Connecticut uninterruptedly for forty years. In addition to his pastoral work, he taught and fitted many young men for college, more than thirty of these having entered the gospel ministry. From 1854 through 1863, he served as principal and proprietor of the Ellington School. In 1871, Chapman made his home in Rocky Hill, Connecticut, and devoted himself to genealogical studies, publishing the genealogies of six families -Buckingham, Bulkeley, Chapman, Coit, Pratt, and Trowbridge- and leaving others in different stages of preparation.

== Early life and education ==
Chapman, elder son of Abisha and Mary (Goss) Chapman, was born in Canfield, Ohio, November 17, 1806. His ancestor, Robert Chapman, was an early Puritan settler of the Colony of Connecticut.

Graduating from Yale College in 1828, Chapman and his schoolmate, Rev. James Allwood Smith, became life-long friends. Chpaman attended every commencement of that institution for the next fifty years.

During the year after graduation from Yale College, Chapman taught at the academy in Sharon, Connecticut, and spent the three succeeding years in the Divinity School of Yale College.

== Career ==
He was ordained pastor of the Congregational Church in Stratford, Conn., September 5, 1832. For the next seven years, his ministry there was marked by revival interest and established services at Putney and Oronoque. Chapman resigned this charge, May 16, 1839, to accept a call from the Congregational Church in Deep River (in Saybrook), where he was installed May 29. The pastoral relation at Deep River was dissolved at the end of September 1850, Chapman having accepted an invitation to settle in South Glastonbury. On October 24, 1850, he was installed in the town's Congregational Church, resigning October 21, 1854, and leaving on October 29, 1854, seven months after the death of his first wife, Emily.

In May 1854, the Ellington School at Ellington was also known as Morris R. Barteau's Family Boarding School for Boys. After Chapman's first wife, Emily, died in March of that year, he joined Barteau at Ellington School as co-Principal/Proprietor, with the Autumn and Winter term which began on November 1, 1854. While Chapman was at Ellington School, it was co-educational. In addition to his administrative duties, he also taught Ancient Languages at the school. By 1856, Barteau was no longer associated with Ellington School. Thereafter, Chapman served as Principal, and for two years, his younger brother, Henry, served as Ellington's Associate Principal and Instructor in Mathematics and English branches. Chapman continued at Ellington School until 1863, supplying in the meantime the church in West Stafford, Conn., for four and a half years (1856–61).

After Ellington, Chapman ministered at the church in Bolton, to which town he next removed by May 1863. Leaving Bolton in 1864, he supplied the pulpit of the Union Church in East Hampton, for two years, and for five years had charge of the church in Prospect.

In 1871, he removed to Rocky Hill, and devoted himself thenceforth to genealogical researches. He had already published, in 1854, a genealogy of the Chapman Family, and in 1864, one of the Pratt Family. Four more volumes compiled by him were printed,—the Trowbridge and Buckingham genealogies in 1872, the Coit Family genealogy in 1874, and the Bulkeley genealogy in 1875. In August 1873, a stroke of paralysis impaired his faculties, but he continued to work until a second stroke, in October 1875, which deprived him of speech, and left him to pass the remaining months in feebleness of body and mind, until his death, at his residence in Rocky Hill, July 20, 1876, in his 70th year.

== Personal life ==
He was married, May 6, 1833, to Emily, eldest child of Henry Hill, of Westbrook, who died in South Glastonbury, of apoplexy, March 30, 1854, aged 44 years. He married secondly, November 7, 1855, Caroline, widow of John Crooks, of East Longmeadow, Mass., and daughter of Samuel Strickland of Ellington, who survived him. Of the three children by his first marriage, only one son, Henry, survived him. For more than fifty years, Henry was an employee of the Hartford Courant. By coincidence. Chapman's second wife died on the same date as his first one, 44 years apart.

== Legacy ==
Works from Chapman's library were donated to the Yale Theological School's new library, built in 1882.

== Selected works ==
=== As F. W. Chapman ===
- The Buckingham family, or, the descendants of Thomas Buckingham, one of the first settlers of Milford, Conn. (Hartford : Case, Lockwood & Brainard, 1872) (text via Internet Archive])
- The Chapman family: or The descendants of Robert Chapman, one of the first settlers of Say-brook, Conn., with genealogical notes of William Chapman, who settled in New London, Conn.; Edward Chapman, who settled at Windsor, Conn.; John Chapman, of Stonington, Conn.; and Rev. Benjamin Chapman, of Southington, Conn (Hartford : Case, Tiffany and Co., 1854) (text via Internet Archive])
- The Coit family; or, The descendants of John Coit, who appears among the settlers of Salem, Mass., in 1638, at Gloucester in 1644, and at New London, Conn., in 1650 (Hartford : Press of the Case, Lockwood & Brainard Co., 1874) (text via Internet Archive)
- The Pratt family or, The descendants of Lieut. William Pratt, one of the first settlers of Hartford and Say-Brook, with genealogical notes of John Pratt, of Hartford; Peter Pratt, of Lyme; John Pratt (Taylor) of Say-Brook (Hartford : Case, Lockwood and Co., 1864) (text via Internet Archive)
- The Trowbridge family, or, Descendants of Thomas Trowbridge, one of the first settlers of New Haven, Conn. (New Haven : Punderson, Crisand, 1872) (text via Internet Archive)
- The Bulkeley family; or the descendants of Rev. Peter Bulkeley, who settled at Concord, Mass., in 1636. Compiled at the request of Joseph E. Bulkeley (Hartford : The Case, Lockwood & Brainard Co., 1875) (text via Internet Archive)
