= James A. Chapman =

American businessman (1881–1966)

- Born: James Allen Chapman; April 3, 1881; Ellis County, Texas
- Died: September 22, 1966 (aged 85); Tulsa, Oklahoma
- Occupation: Businessman
- Known for: Oilman, philanthropist, rancher

James A. Chapman (April 3, 1881 – September 22, 1966) was a businessman closely associated with Tulsa, Oklahoma. He was nephew, son-in-law and business partner to Robert M. McFarlin.

== Business career ==
James A. Chapman was born April 3, 1881, to Phillip and Roxana Chapman in Ellis County, Texas. He moved to Holdenville, Oklahoma, in 1901. He was a co-founder of first Holdenville Oil and Gas Company, then McMan Oil Company, and finally McMan Oil and Gas Company with his uncle and father-in-law Robert M. McFarlin. The companies participated in the exploitation of the Glenn Pool and Cushing oil fields of Oklahoma in the early 20th century. The McMan Oil Company was sold to the Magnolia Petroleum Company for $39,000,000 in 1916, and the McMan Oil and Gas Company was sold to the Standard Oil (Indiana) subsidiary Dixie Oil for $20 million in 1930.

== Family ==
Chapman married Leta McFarlin (1889–1974) in 1908, and moved to Tulsa in 1912. They had a son, H. Allen Chapman (1919–1979), who was born in Colorado in 1919.

== Philanthropy ==
Chapman and his family used the resulting fortune to establish philanthropic trusts that fund charities in Oklahoma, Texas, and Arkansas. Funds are only distributed to the named beneficiaries of the trusts, which include institutions such as the University of Tulsa, Trinity University of San Antonio, Texas, John Brown University of Siloam Springs, Arkansas, and the Oklahoma Medical Research Foundation. According to Internal Revenue Service Form 990 filings found at GuideStar, these trusts have reported well over one billion dollars in assets in recent years.

At the time of his death, James Chapman's estate was assessed to be worth $120 million.

Chapman was also very fond of ranching and worked on the Chapman-Barnard Ranch in Osage County, Oklahoma, for many years. He had long maintained that ranching, rather than business, was his first love.

In 1968, he was inducted into the Hall of Great Westerners of the National Cowboy & Western Heritage Museum.
