= Samuel Chapman (philatelist) =

British philatelist

Samuel Chapman (1859 – 22 May 1943) was a British philatelist who was added to the Roll of Distinguished Philatelists in 1938.

Chapman lived in Mexico for many years and became an expert on the stamps of that country. He was one of the collectors that Edward Stanley Gibbons visited on his travels as reported in the pages of Stanley Gibbons Monthly Journal in 1895. Gibbons and his wife visited Chapman and his wife at their villa in Coyoacan which he recounted stood in extensive grounds. Near the end of his life, Chapman helped the firm of Stanley Gibbons compile their listing of Mexican stamps and was a frequent correspondent with the philatelic press. In his later years he was bed-ridden.

== Selected publications ==
- Stamps of Mexico, 1856-68. Collectors Club of New York, New York, 1926.
