= Keith Chapman (footballer) =

Australian rules footballer (1934–2007)

Personal information
- Full name: Keith Chapman
- Born: 3 March 1934
- Died: 13 December 2007 (aged 73)
- Original team: Lincoln Stars
- Height: 178 cm (5 ft 10 in)
- Weight: 63 kg (139 lb)
- Position: Wingman

Playing career^{1}
Years	Club	Games (Goals)
1955	Essendon	6 (1)
- ^{1} Playing statistics correct to the end of 1955.

Keith Chapman (3 March 1934 – 13 December 2007) was an Australian rules footballer who played with Essendon in the Victorian Football League (VFL). He later played for Coburg in the Victorian Football Association (VFA).
