= David Chapman (journalist) =

American journalist (born 1976)

David Chapman (born April 1, 1976) is an entertainment writer/producer covering various pop culture interests, particularly the video game and comic book industries. Chapman's freelance work has appeared in a variety of outlets, including GameSpy and the US version of Play Magazine. Chapman produced a number of segments for the video game television show The Electric Playground, including most of the show's popular 'Comic of the Week' segments, and continues to occasionally write and produce content for the show and its website. Chapman was the News Editor for the video game website, Game Almighty, and has been a regular writer for TeamXbox, GameSpy, and Crispy Gamer. Chapman also wrote regular weekly articles for USA Network's Character Arcade, covering the interactive entertainment industry and writing monthly "Character Spotlight" articles showcasing biographies of various video game characters.

Some examples of Chapman's work in the video game industry include Play Magazine's coverage of the Zero Hour launch event for Microsoft's Xbox 360 game console, and GameSpy's list of the ten best and ten worst comic book based video games of all time. David also contributed to GameSpy's list of the Top 25 Xbox Games of All-Time.

Chapman was selected to participate as a juror for the 1st Annual Canadian Awards for the Electronic and Animated Arts (CAEAA) in 2007 and again in 2009.
