= 1939 New York Yankees season =

Season for the Major League Baseball team the New York Yankees

1939 New York Yankees
- World Series champions American League champions
- League: American League
- Ballpark: Yankee Stadium
- City: New York City, New York
- Record: 106–45 (.702)
- League place: 1st
- Owners: Estate of Jacob Ruppert
- General managers: Ed Barrow
- Managers: Joe McCarthy
- Radio: WABC (AM) (Arch McDonald, Garnett Marks, Mel Allen)

The 1939 New York Yankees season was the team's 37th season. The team finished with a record of 106–45, winning their 11th pennant, finishing 17 games ahead of the Boston Red Sox. New York was managed by Joe McCarthy. The Yankees played their home games at Yankee Stadium. In the World Series, they beat the Cincinnati Reds in four games. As the Yankees had won each World Series dating back to 1936, this marked the first time any team had won four consecutive World Series. This was the first season for the Yankee's radio gameday broadcasts.

== Regular season ==
The 1939 New York Yankees are one of only three Yankees teams (the 1927 and 1998 Yankees being the others) to ever finish the regular season with over a .700 winning percentage, lead the league in runs scored and fewest runs allowed, and go on to sweep the World Series. The 1939 Yankees are the only team to ever outscore their regular season opponents by over 400 runs (967–556).

=== "The Luckiest Man on the Face of the Earth" ===
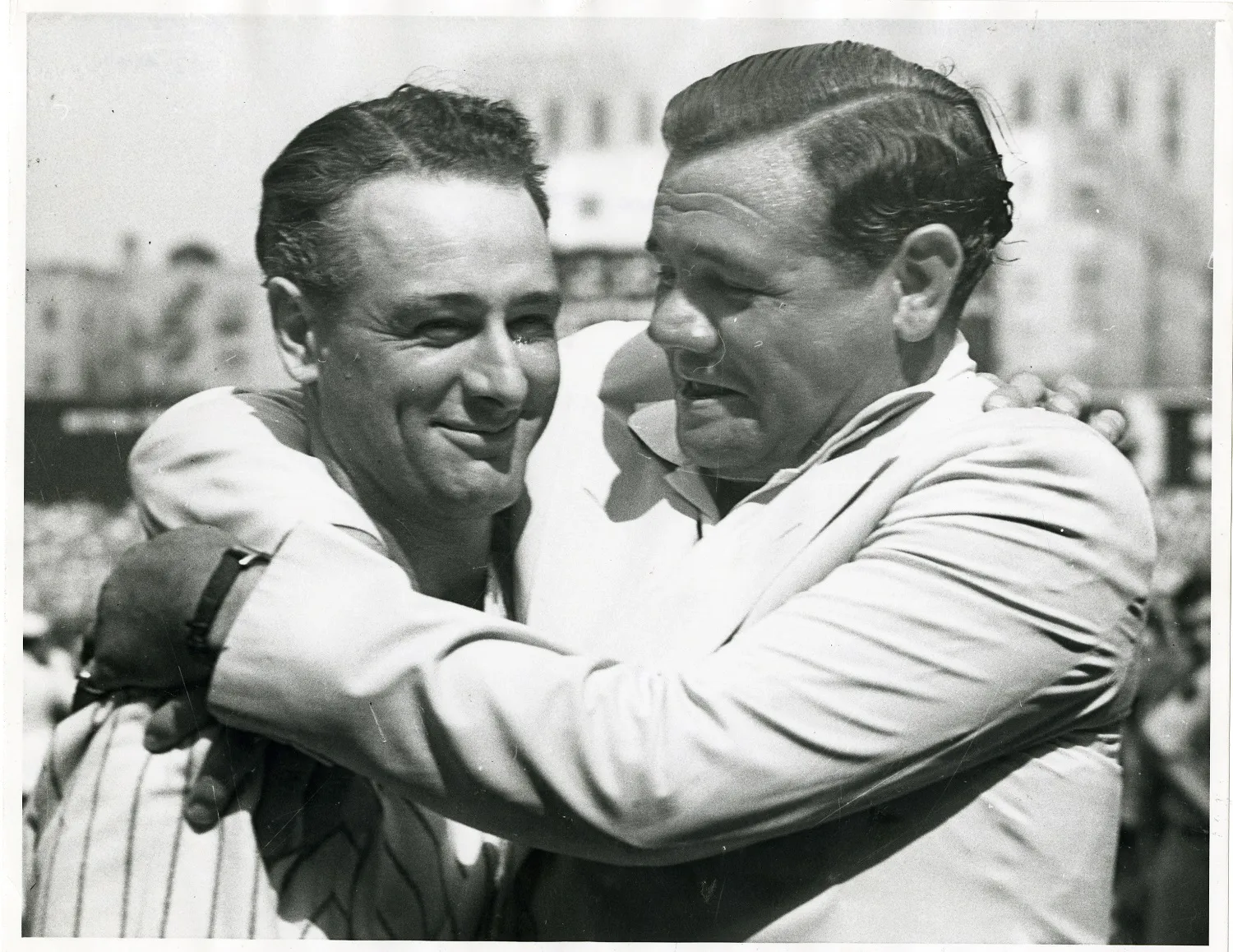
The Yankee duo reunited – Lou Gehrig and Babe Ruth (r) on Lou Gehrig Day (July 4, 1939).

Lou Gehrig's number 4 was retired by the New York Yankees in 1939.

The 1939 season would be the final time Yankees fans saw the team's starting veteran first baseman Lou Gehrig in action and in the uniform of the team he played for many years, given his declining health. On June 21, the New York Yankees announced his official retirement and proclaimed July 4, 1939, "Lou Gehrig Appreciation Day" at Yankee Stadium. Between games of the Independence Day doubleheader against the Washington Senators, the poignant ceremonies were held on the diamond. In its coverage the following day, The New York Times said it was "Perhaps as colorful and dramatic a pageant as ever was enacted on a baseball field [as] 61,808 fans thundered a hail and farewell". Dignitaries extolled the dying slugger and the members of the 1927 Yankees World Championship team, known as "Murderer's Row", attended the ceremonies. New York Mayor Fiorello La Guardia called Gehrig "the greatest prototype of good sportsmanship and citizenship" and Postmaster General James Farley concluded his speech by predicting, "For generations to come, boys who play baseball will point with pride to your record."

Yankees manager Joe McCarthy, struggling to control his emotions, then spoke of Lou Gehrig, with whom there was a close, almost father and son-like bond. After describing Gehrig as "the finest example of a ballplayer, sportsman, and citizen that baseball has ever known", McCarthy could stand it no longer. Turning tearfully to Gehrig, the manager said, "Lou, what else can I say except that it was a sad day in the life of everybody who knew you when you came into my hotel room that day in Detroit and told me you were quitting as a ballplayer because you felt yourself a hindrance to the team. My God, man, you were never that."

The Yankees retired Gehrig's uniform number "4", making him the first player in history to be afforded that honor. Gehrig was given many gifts, commemorative plaques, and trophies. Some came from VIPs; others came from the stadium's groundskeepers and janitorial staff. Footage of the ceremonies shows Gehrig being handed various gifts, and immediately setting them down on the ground, because he no longer had the arm strength to hold them.

=== Season standings ===
American League
Team	W	L	Pct.	GB	Home	Road
New York Yankees	106	45	.702	—	52‍–‍25	54‍–‍20
Boston Red Sox	89	62	.589	17	42‍–‍32	47‍–‍30
Cleveland Indians	87	67	.565	20½	44‍–‍33	43‍–‍34
Chicago White Sox	85	69	.552	22½	50‍–‍27	35‍–‍42
Detroit Tigers	81	73	.526	26½	42‍–‍35	39‍–‍38
Washington Senators	65	87	.428	41½	37‍–‍39	28‍–‍48
Philadelphia Athletics	55	97	.362	51½	28‍–‍48	27‍–‍49
St. Louis Browns	43	111	.279	64½	18‍–‍59	25‍–‍52

=== Game log ===
1939 game log: 106–45 (Home: 52–25; Away: 54–20)
April: 5–3 (Home: 3–2; Away: 2–1)

#	Date	Opponent	Score	Win	Loss	Save	Stadium	Attendance	Record
1	April 20	Red Sox	2–0	Ruffing (1–0)	Grove (0–1)		Yankee Stadium	30,278	1–0
2	April 21	@ Senators	6–3	Gomez (1–0)	Krakauskas (0–1)		Griffith Stadium	32,000	2–0
3	April 22	@ Senators	1–3	Leonard (1–0)	Hildebrand (0–1)		Griffith Stadium	12,000	2–1
4	April 23	@ Senators	7–4	Sundra (1–0)	Chase (0–1)		Griffith Stadium	22,000	3–1
5	April 24	Athletics	2–1	Pearson (1–0)	Dean (0–1)		Yankee Stadium	5,820	4–1
6	April 25	Athletics	8–4	Ruffing (2–0)	Thomas (0–1)	Hadley (1)	Yankee Stadium	7,268	5–1
7	April 29	Senators	1–3	Chase (1–1)	Gomez (1–1)		Yankee Stadium	11,473	5–2
8	April 30	Senators	2–3	Krakauskas (1–2)	Hildebrand (0–2)	Carrasquel (1)	Yankee Stadium	23,712	5–3

May: 24–4 (Home: 12–1; Away: 12–3)

#	Date	Opponent	Score	Win	Loss	Save	Stadium	Attendance	Record
9	May 2	@ Tigers	22–2	Ruffing (3–0)	Kennedy (0–2)		Briggs Stadium	11,379	6–3
10	May 3	@ Tigers	10–6	Sundra (2–0)	Benton (0–1)	Murphy (1)	Briggs Stadium	14,136	7–3
11	May 4	@ Indians	10–6 (10)	Murphy (1–0)	Feller (3–1)		League Park	12,000	8–3
12	May 5	@ Indians	1–2 (11)	Milnar (1–0)	Gomez (1–2)		League Park	9,000	8–4
13	May 6	@ Indians	5–1	Pearson (2–0)	Sullivan (0–1)		League Park	10,000	9–4
14	May 7	@ White Sox	15–4	Ruffing (4–0)	Whitehead (0–2)		Comiskey Park	35,000	10–4
15	May 8	@ White Sox	3–5	Smith (2–0)	Ferrell (0–1)		Comiskey Park	6,000	10–5
16	May 9	@ White Sox	8–6	Donald (1–0)	Lee (3–2)	Murphy (2)	Comiskey Park	7,000	11–5
17	May 10	@ Browns	7–1	Hadley (1–0)	Marcum (2–3)		Sportsman's Park	3,782	12–5
18	May 11	@ Browns	10–8	Pearson (3–0)	Pyle (0–2)	Murphy (3)	Sportsman's Park	3,167	13–5
19	May 14	@ Athletics	10–0	Ruffing (5–0)	Caster (3–3)		Shibe Park	15,509	14–5
20	May 15	@ Athletics	3–0	Ferrell (1–1)	Ross (0–3)	Murphy (4)	Shibe Park	5,000	15–5
21	May 16	Browns	7–5	Hadley (2–0)	Kramer (3–1)	Donald (1)	Yankee Stadium	6,503	16–5
22	May 17	Browns	4–3	Pearson (4–0)	Kennedy (0–4)		Yankee Stadium	7,576	17–5
23	May 18	Browns	8–1	Donald (2–0)	Mills (0–2)		Yankee Stadium	6,870	18–5
24	May 19	White Sox	4–2	Ruffing (6–0)	Smith (2–2)		Yankee Stadium	9,755	19–5
25	May 20	White Sox	5–2	Hildebrand (1–2)	Lee (3–4)	Murphy (5)	Yankee Stadium	18,371	20–5
26	May 21	Indians	12–6	Hadley (3–0)	Humphries (1–3)		Yankee Stadium	37,531	21–5
27	May 23	Indians	7–3	Donald (3–0)	Allen (0–2)		Yankee Stadium	5,058	22–5
28	May 24	Tigers	1–6	Trout (1–2)	Ferrell (1–2)		Yankee Stadium	10,875	22–6
29	May 25	Tigers	5–2	Ruffing (7–0)	McKain (1–1)		Yankee Stadium	12,087	23–6
30	May 26	Athletics	1–0	Hildebrand (2–2)	Pippen (0–2)		Yankee Stadium	5,139	24–6
31	May 27	Athletics	8–2	Gomez (2–2)	Parmelee (1–6)		Yankee Stadium	–	25–6
32	May 27	Athletics	11–9	Sundra (3–0)	Dean (1–2)	Murphy (6)	Yankee Stadium	30,358	26–6
33	May 28	Athletics	9–5	Donald (4–0)	Nelson (2–1)		Yankee Stadium	14,670	27–6
34	May 29	@ Red Sox	6–1	Hadley (4–0)	Bagby (3–2)	Murphy (7)	Fenway Park	17,000	28–6
35	May 30	@ Red Sox	4–8	Weaver (1–0)	Ruffing (7–1)		Fenway Park	–	28–7
36	May 30	@ Red Sox	17–9	Pearson (5–0)	Wilson (2–3)	Murphy (8)	Fenway Park	35,000	29–7

June: 21–7 (Home: 9–3; Away: 12–4)

#	Date	Opponent	Score	Win	Loss	Save	Stadium	Attendance	Record
37	June 1	@ Indians	8–3	Gomez (3–2)	Milnar (3–1)		League Park	3,500	30–7
38	June 2	@ Indians	17–5	Donald (5–0)	Allen (1–3)		League Park	8,000	31–7
39	June 3	@ Indians	3–2	Hadley (5–0)	Harder (0–3)	Murphy (9)	League Park	6,000	32–7
40	June 4	@ Tigers	8–4	Ruffing (8–1)	Trout (2–3)	Murphy (10)	Briggs Stadium	44,190	33–7
41	June 5	@ Tigers	0–3	Bridges (7–1)	Pearson (5–1)		Briggs Stadium	9,910	33–8
42	June 6	@ Tigers	2–6	Newsom (6–3)	Hildebrand (2–3)		Briggs Stadium	11,924	33–9
43	June 7	@ White Sox	5–2	Gomez (4–2)	Lee (4–6)	Murphy (11)	Comiskey Park	8,000	34–9
44	June 8	@ White Sox	7–2	Donald (6–0)	Smith (3–4)		Comiskey Park	7,500	35–9
45	June 11	@ Browns	8–5	Ruffing (9–1)	Whitehead (0–5)		Sportsman's Park	–	36–9
46	June 11	@ Browns	5–1	Hadley (6–0)	Mills (1–4)		Sportsman's Park	7,810	37–9
47	June 14	Indians	2–4	Feller (10–2)	Murphy (1–1)	Milnar (1)	Yankee Stadium	11,301	37–10
48	June 15	Indians	1–0	Gomez (5–2)	Harder (1–4)		Yankee Stadium	9,619	38–10
49	June 16	Indians	4–3	Donald (7–0)	Milnar (4–3)	Russo (1)	Yankee Stadium	10,171	39–10
50	June 17	Tigers	1–0	Ruffing (10–1)	Newsom (7–4)		Yankee Stadium	18,599	40–10
51	June 18	Tigers	5–8	Rowe (2–5)	Hadley (6–1)		Yankee Stadium	32,679	40–11
52	June 19	Tigers	8–5	Hildebrand (3–3)	Trout (4–4)		Yankee Stadium	6,469	41–11
53	June 20	White Sox	13–3	Pearson (6–1)	Knott (2–2)		Yankee Stadium	5,892	42–11
54	June 21	White Sox	9–8	Sundra (4–0)	Brown (4–1)	Murphy (12)	Yankee Stadium	10,045	43–11
55	June 22	White Sox	6–1	Donald (8–0)	Smith (3–5)		Yankee Stadium	8,337	44–11
56	June 24	Browns	2–1	Ruffing (11–1)	Harris (1–2)		Yankee Stadium	11,382	45–11
57	June 25	Browns	3–7	Kramer (6–6)	Murphy (1–2)	Mills (1)	Yankee Stadium	–	45–12
58	June 25	Browns	11–2	Hildebrand (4–3)	Kennedy (4–8)		Yankee Stadium	40,861	46–12
59	June 26	@ Athletics	2–3	Pippen (1–5)	Hadley (6–2)		Shibe Park	33,074	46–13
60	June 28	@ Athletics	23–2	Pearson (7–1)	Nelson (5–3)		Shibe Park	–	47–13
61	June 28	@ Athletics	10–0	Gomez (6–2)	Caster (5–8)		Shibe Park	21,612	48–13
62	June 29	@ Senators	1–2 (12)	Leonard (7–2)	Ruffing (11–2)		Griffith Stadium	–	48–14
63	June 29	@ Senators	7–0 (6)	Donald (9–0)	Chase (3–9)		Griffith Stadium	6,500	49–14
64	June 30	@ Senators	10–2 (7)	Hildebrand (5–3)	Carrasquel (4–5)		Griffith Stadium	6,000	50–14

July: 16–12 (Home: 6–7; Away: 10–5)

#	Date	Opponent	Score	Win	Loss	Save	Stadium	Attendance	Record
65	July 1	@ Red Sox	3–5	Ostermueller (4–1)	Russo (0–1)		Fenway Park	12,000	50–15
66	July 2	@ Red Sox	3–7	Grove (8–2)	Gomez (6–3)		Fenway Park	–	50–16
67	July 2	@ Red Sox	9–3	Hadley (7–2)	Auker (6–4)		Fenway Park	35,000	51–16
68	July 4	Senators	2–3	Leonard (8–2)	Pearson (7–2)		Yankee Stadium	–	51–17
69	July 4	Senators	11–1	Sundra (5–0)	Carrasquel (4–6)		Yankee Stadium	61,808	52–17
70	July 5	Senators	6–4	Donald (10–0)	Chase (3–10)		Yankee Stadium	3,874	53–17
71	July 7	Red Sox	3–4	Dickman (2–1)	Ruffing (11–3)		Yankee Stadium	6,588	53–18
72	July 8	Red Sox	1–3	Ostermueller (5–1)	Hildebrand (5–4)		Yankee Stadium	–	53–19
73	July 8	Red Sox	2–3	Galehouse (3–3)	Russo (0–2)		Yankee Stadium	27,539	53–20
74	July 9	Red Sox	3–4	Dickman (3–1)	Pearson (7–3)		Yankee Stadium	–	53–21
75	July 9	Red Sox	3–5	Wilson (5–5)	Hadley (7–3)	Heving (4)	Yankee Stadium	47,652	53–22
7th All-Star Game in The Bronx, New York
76	July 13	@ Tigers	6–10	Thomas (5–1)	Murphy (1–3)	Benton (2)	Briggs Stadium	25,764	53–23
77	July 14	@ Tigers	6–3	Ruffing (12–3)	Rowe (2–8)		Briggs Stadium	19,279	54–23
78	July 15	@ Tigers	10–7	Pearson (8–3)	Bridges (11–3)	Murphy (13)	Briggs Stadium	31,253	55–23
79	July 16	@ Indians	5–2	Gomez (7–3)	Eisenstat (4–4)		Cleveland Stadium	–	56–23
80	July 16	@ Indians	8–3	Russo (1–2)	Harder (3–7)		Cleveland Stadium	63,064	57–23
81	July 17	@ Indians	3–0	Hadley (8–3)	Feller (14–4)		Cleveland Stadium	10,000	58–23
82	July 18	@ Browns	9–0	Donald (11–0)	Mills (2–6)		Sportsman's Park	–	59–23
83	July 18	@ Browns	4–3	Hildebrand (6–4)	Kramer (6–9)	Murphy (14)	Sportsman's Park	4,853	60–23
84	July 20	@ Browns	2–1	Ruffing (13–3)	Harris (2–5)		Sportsman's Park	3,100	61–23
85	July 21	@ White Sox	1–4	Smith (6–5)	Pearson (8–4)		Comiskey Park	10,000	61–24
86	July 23	@ White Sox	5–8	Lyons (10–2)	Gomez (7–4)		Comiskey Park	–	61–25
87	July 23	@ White Sox	5–4	Hadley (9–3)	Brown (7–4)	Murphy (15)	Comiskey Park	51,000	62–25
88	July 25	Browns	5–1	Donald (12–0)	Harris (2–6)		Yankee Stadium	6,076	63–25
89	July 26	Browns	14–1	Ruffing (14–3)	Gill (1–9)		Yankee Stadium	4,843	64–25
90	July 28	White Sox	2–1	Hildebrand (7–4)	Smith (6–6)		Yankee Stadium	7,946	65–25
91	July 30	White Sox	4–3	Gomez (8–4)	Lyons (10–3)	Murphy (16)	Yankee Stadium	–	66–25
92	July 30	White Sox	1–5	Lee (9–8)	Hadley (9–4)		Yankee Stadium	35,256	66–26

August: 21–10 (Home: 8–5; Away: 13–5)

#	Date	Opponent	Score	Win	Loss	Save	Stadium	Attendance	Record
93	August 1	Tigers	2–5	Trout (6–7)	Ruffing (14–4)	McKain (3)	Yankee Stadium	10,382	66–27
94	August 2	Tigers	2–7	Rowe (4–9)	Donald (12–1)		Yankee Stadium	12,341	66–28
95	August 3	Tigers	12–3	Pearson (9–4)	Newsom (12–8)		Yankee Stadium	9,010	67–28
96	August 4	Indians	5–4	Hildebrand (8–4)	Milnar (6–8)	Russo (2)	Yankee Stadium	6,263	68–28
97	August 5	Indians	6–1	Ruffing (15–4)	Eisenstat (5–5)		Yankee Stadium	13,207	69–28
98	August 6	Indians	4–5	Feller (16–6)	Gomez (8–5)		Yankee Stadium	–	69–29
99	August 6	Indians	1–7	Harder (7–7)	Hadley (9–5)		Yankee Stadium	76,753	69–30
100	August 8	@ Senators	4–7	Krakauskas (9–11)	Donald (12–2)	Appleton (5)	Griffith Stadium	12,000	69–31
101	August 9	@ Senators	13–8	Ruffing (16–4)	Chase (7–14)	Hildebrand (1)	Griffith Stadium	14,000	70–31
102	August 10	@ Senators	5–7	Leonard (13–4)	Pearson (9–5)	Appleton (6)	Griffith Stadium	14,000	70–32
103	August 11	@ Athletics	9–5	Gomez (9–5)	Potter (6–8)	Hadley (2)	Shibe Park	14,116	71–32
104	August 12	@ Athletics	18–4	Sundra (6–0)	Joyce (3–5)		Shibe Park	4,000	72–32
105	August 13	@ Athletics	9–12	Nelson (7–7)	Russo (1–3)		Shibe Park	–	72–33
106	August 13	@ Athletics	21–0 (8)	Ruffing (17–4)	Pippen (2–9)		Shibe Park	34,570	73–33
107	August 15	Senators	3–2 (10)	Gomez (10–5)	Chase (7–15)		Yankee Stadium	8,049	74–33
108	August 16	Senators	4–0	Russo (2–3)	Leonard (13–5)		Yankee Stadium	6,607	75–33
109	August 17	Senators	9–8 (10)	Murphy (2–3)	Appleton (3–8)		Yankee Stadium	6,704	76–33
110	August 18	Athletics	5–0	Ruffing (18–4)	Pippen (2–10)		Yankee Stadium	6,041	77–33
111	August 20	Athletics	4–5	Ross (5–11)	Gomez (10–6)		Yankee Stadium	–	77–34
112	August 20	Athletics	5–1	Sundra (7–0)	Nelson (8–8)		Yankee Stadium	33,562	78–34
113	August 22	@ White Sox	14–5	Russo (3–3)	Marcum (5–7)		Comiskey Park	50,000	79–34
114	August 23	@ White Sox	7–2	Donald (13–2)	Smith (8–8)		Comiskey Park	–	80–34
115	August 23	@ White Sox	16–4	Ruffing (19–4)	Lee (11–9)		Comiskey Park	27,000	81–34
116	August 24	@ Browns	11–5	Pearson (10–5)	Mills (3–9)	Murphy (17)	Sportsman's Park	1,225	82–34
117	August 25	@ Browns	11–0	Sundra (8–0)	Kennedy (8–16)		Sportsman's Park	–	83–34
118	August 25	@ Browns	8–2	Gomez (11–6)	Gill (1–11)		Sportsman's Park	2,182	84–34
119	August 26	@ Browns	6–1	Hadley (10–5)	Harris (2–10)		Sportsman's Park	2,967	85–34
120	August 27	@ Tigers	13–3	Ruffing (20–4)	Rowe (7–10)		Briggs Stadium	47,966	86–34
121	August 28	@ Tigers	18–2	Russo (4–3)	Bridges (16–5)		Briggs Stadium	14,281	87–34
122	August 29	@ Tigers	6–7	McKain (3–4)	Murphy (2–4)		Briggs Stadium	11,397	87–35
123	August 30	@ Indians	3–4 (10)	Eisenstat (7–6)	Murphy (2–5)		Cleveland Stadium	35,336	87–36

September: 19–9 (Home: 14–7; Away: 5–2)

#	Date	Opponent	Score	Win	Loss	Save	Stadium	Attendance	Record
124	September 1	@ Indians	11–8	Chandler (1–0)	Eisenstat (7–7)	Russo (3)	Cleveland Stadium	20,000	88–36
125	September 2	@ Red Sox	7–12	Ostermueller (11–3)	Ruffing (20–5)	Heving (7)	Fenway Park	12,500	88–37
126	September 3	@ Red Sox	11–12	Auker (9–8)	Murphy (2–6)	Heving (8)	Fenway Park	–	88–38
127	September 3	@ Red Sox	5–5 (7)				Fenway Park	27,000	88–38
128	September 4	@ Athletics	7–6	Chandler (2–0)	Potter (7–10)	Murphy (18)	Shibe Park	–	89–38
129	September 4	@ Athletics	2–0	Russo (5–3)	Nelson (9–10)		Shibe Park	24,126	90–38
130	September 6	Red Sox	2–1	Gomez (12–6)	Grove (13–4)		Yankee Stadium	11,715	91–38
131	September 7	Red Sox	5–2	Pearson (11–5)	Ostermueller (11–4)	Hildebrand (2)	Yankee Stadium	9,379	92–38
132	September 8	Red Sox	4–1 (7)	Ruffing (21–5)	Galehouse (7–9)		Yankee Stadium	8,457	93–38
133	September 9	Senators	5–2	Sundra (9–0)	Haynes (6–12)		Yankee Stadium	7,401	94–38
134	September 10	Senators	4–3	Russo (6–3)	Appleton (4–10)		Yankee Stadium	–	95–38
135	September 10	Senators	6–2	Hadley (11–5)	Leonard (17–7)	Murphy (19)	Yankee Stadium	12,088	96–38
136	September 12	Indians	3–4 (10)	Harder (12–8)	Gomez (12–7)		Yankee Stadium	4,638	96–39
137	September 13	Indians	4–9	Feller (21–8)	Ruffing (21–6)		Yankee Stadium	9,898	96–40
138	September 14	Tigers	1–6	Newsom (17–11)	Donald (13–3)		Yankee Stadium	10,938	96–41
139	September 15	Tigers	10–3	Sundra (10–0)	Rowe (8–11)		Yankee Stadium	10,538	97–41
140	September 16	Tigers	8–5	Russo (7–3)	Pippen (4–12)		Yankee Stadium	10,626	98–41
141	September 17	Browns	4–8	Kramer (9–14)	Ruffing (21–7)		Yankee Stadium	–	98–42
142	September 17	Browns	1–3	Mills (4–11)	Gomez (12–8)		Yankee Stadium	21,027	98–43
143	September 18	Browns	6–2	Hadley (12–5)	Wade (1–5)		Yankee Stadium	1,678	99–43
144	September 19	White Sox	6–2	Hildebrand (9–4)	Smith (9–10)		Yankee Stadium	3,608	100–43
145	September 20	White Sox	8–4	Sundra (11–0)	Lyons (13–6)		Yankee Stadium	2,977	101–43
146	September 21	White Sox	5–2	Russo (8–3)	Dietrich (7–8)		Yankee Stadium	2,150	102–43
147	September 23	@ Senators	7–1	Pearson (12–5)	Leonard (19–8)		Griffith Stadium	8,000	103–43
148	September 24	@ Senators	3–2	Chandler (3–0)	Chase (10–19)		Griffith Stadium	12,000	104–43
149	September 28	Athletics	8–4	Hildebrand (10–4)	McCrabb (1–2)		Yankee Stadium	–	105–43
150	September 28	Athletics	4–5	Caster (9–9)	Hadley (12–6)		Yankee Stadium	4,187	105–44
151	September 30	Red Sox	5–4	Murphy (3–6)	Bagby (5–5)		Yankee Stadium	–	106–44
152	September 30	Red Sox	2–4 (7)	Wilson (11–11)	Sundra (11–1)		Yankee Stadium	7,501	106–45

=== Record vs. opponents ===
1939 American League record Sources:
Team	BOS	CWS	CLE	DET	NYY	PHA	SLB	WSH
Boston	—	8–14	11–11	10–12	11–8–1	18–4	16–6	15–7
Chicago	14–8	—	12–10	12–10	4–18	11–11	18–4	14–8–1
Cleveland	11–11	10–12	—	11–11	7–15	18–4	16–6	14–8
Detroit	12–10	10–12	11–11	—	9–13	11–11	14–8–1	14–8
New York	8–11–1	18–4	15–7	13–9	—	18–4	19–3	15–7
Philadelphia	4–18	11–11	4–18	11–11	4–18	—	13–9–1	8–12
St. Louis	6–16	4–18	6–16	8–14–1	3–19	9–13–1	—	7–15
Washington	7–15	8–14–1	8–14	8–14	7–15	12–8	15–7	—

=== Notable transactions ===
- April 8, 1939: Len Gabrielson was traded by the Yankees to the Philadelphia Phillies for Pete Sivess and cash.

=== Roster ===
1939 New York Yankees
Roster
Pitchers: 24 Marv Breuer; 21,27 Spud Chandler; 28 Atley Donald; 25 Wes Ferrell; 11 Lefty Gomez; 14 Bump Hadley; 20 Oral Hildebrand; 19 Johnny Murphy; 16 Monte Pearson; 15 Red Ruffing; 22 Marius Russo; 32 Steve Sundra	Catchers: 8 Bill Dickey; 18 Arndt Jorgens; 26 Buddy Rosar; Infielders: 1 Frankie Crosetti; 12 Babe Dahlgren; 4 Lou Gehrig; 6 Joe Gordon; 10 Bill Knickerbocker; 2 Red Rolfe	Outfielders: 5 Joe DiMaggio; 27 Joe Gallagher; 7 Tommy Henrich; 9 Charlie Keller; 17 Jake Powell; 3 George Selkirk	Manager: -- Joe McCarthy; Coaches: 30 Earle Combs; 29 Art Fletcher; 31 Johnny Schulte

== Player stats ==
= Indicates team leader

= Indicates league leader

=== Batting ===
==== Starters by position ====
Note: Pos = Position; G = Games played; AB = At bats; H = Hits; Avg. = Batting average; HR = Home runs; RBI = Runs batted in

Pos	Player	G	AB	H	Avg.	HR	RBI
C	Bill Dickey	128	480	145	.302	24	105
1B	Babe Dahlgren	144	531	125	.235	15	89
2B	Joe Gordon	151	567	161	.284	28	111
3B	Red Rolfe	152	648	213	.329	14	80
SS	Frankie Crosetti	152	656	154	.233	10	56
OF	Joe DiMaggio	120	462	176	.381	30	126
OF	George Selkirk	128	418	128	.306	21	101
OF	Charlie Keller	111	398	133	.334	11	83

==== Other batters ====
Note: G = Games played; AB = At bats; H = Hits; Avg. = Batting average; HR = Home runs; RBI = Runs batted in

Player	G	AB	H	Avg.	HR	RBI
Tommy Henrich	99	347	96	.277	9	57
Buddy Rosar	43	105	29	.276	0	12
Jake Powell	31	86	21	.244	1	9
Joe Gallagher	14	41	10	.244	2	9
Lou Gehrig	8	28	4	.143	0	1
Bill Knickerbocker	6	13	2	.154	0	1
Arndt Jorgens	3	0	0	----	0	0

=== Pitching ===
==== Starting pitchers ====
Note: G = Games pitched; IP = Innings pitched; W = Wins; L = Losses; ERA = Earned run average; SO = Strikeouts

Player	G	IP	W	L	ERA	SO
Red Ruffing	28	233.1	21	7	2.93	95
Lefty Gomez	26	198.0	12	8	3.41	102
Bump Hadley	26	154.0	12	6	2.98	65
Atley Donald	24	153.0	13	3	3.71	55
Monte Pearson	22	146.1	12	5	4.49	76
Oral Hildebrand	21	126.2	10	4	3.06	50
Wes Ferrell	3	19.1	1	2	4.66	6

==== Other pitchers ====
Note: G = Games pitched; IP = Innings pitched; W = Wins; L = Losses; ERA = Earned run average; SO = Strikeouts

Player	G	IP	W	L	ERA	SO
Steve Sundra	24	121.2	11	1	2.76	27
Marius Russo	21	116.0	8	3	2.41	55

==== Relief pitchers ====
Note: G = Games pitched; W = Wins; L = Losses; SV = Saves; ERA = Earned run average; SO = Strikeouts

Player	G	W	L	SV	ERA	SO
Johnny Murphy	38	3	6	19	4.40	30
Spud Chandler	11	3	0	0	2.84	4
Marv Breuer	1	1	0	0	9.00	0

== 1939 World Series ==
AL New York Yankees (4) vs. NL Cincinnati Reds (0)

Game	Score	Date	Location	Attendance
1	Reds – 1, Yankees – 2	October 4	Yankee Stadium	58,541
2	Reds – 0, Yankees – 4	October 5	Yankee Stadium	59,791
3	Yankees – 7, Reds – 3	October 7	Crosley Field	32,723
4	Yankees – 7, Reds – 4 (10 innings)	October 8	Crosley Field	32,794

== Awards and honors ==
=== Team ===
The book Baseball Dynasties: The Greatest Teams of All Time ranked the 1939 Yankees the greatest MLB team of all time. In 2017, website FiveThirtyEight ranked the 1939 Yankees as the greatest team of all time (across major North American sports leagues), based on Elo rating.

In the MLB modern era (since 1900), the 1939 Yankees have recorded the best run differential, +411, having scored 967 runs while allowing 556.

=== Individuals ===
The Yankees, in hosting the 1939 All-Star Game at Yankee Stadium, were represented by Red Ruffing, Joe DiMaggio, Joe Gordon, Bill Dickey, Lefty Gomez, Frankie Crosetti, George Selkirk and Johnny Murphy. Lou Gehrig attended the game as part of the AL reserves and did not play.

Joe DiMaggio won his first of three Most Valuable Player (MVP) Awards, though he only played 120 games due to injury. He batted .381 and averaged over one RBI per game.

== Farm system ==
Level	Team	League	Manager
AA	Kansas City Blues	American Association	Billy Meyer
AA	Newark Bears	International League	Johnny Neun
A	Binghamton Triplets	Eastern League	Bruno Betzel
B	Norfolk Tars	Piedmont League	Ray White
B	Augusta Tigers	Sally League	Lefty Jenkins
B	Wenatchee Chiefs	Western International League	Glenn Wright
C	Amsterdam Rugmakers	Canadian–American League	Eddie Sawyer
C	Akron Yankees	Middle Atlantic League	Pip Koehler
C	Joplin Miners	Western Association	Claude Jonnard
D	Newport Canners	Appalachian League	Pete Doyle, Clarence Harris, Bob O'Brien, Ken Mackes and Art Ruble
D	El Paso Texans	Arizona–Texas League	Ted Mayer
D	Neosho Yankees	Arkansas–Missouri League	Dennis Burns
D	Easton Yankees	Eastern Shore League	Ray Powell
D	Butler Yankees	Pennsylvania State Association	Tom Kain
D	Big Spring Barons	West Texas–New Mexico League	Tony Rego
D	Norfolk Elks	Western League	Doc Bennett

LEAGUE CHAMPIONS: Augusta
