= 1939 St. Louis Browns season =

Major League Baseball season

1939 St. Louis Browns
- League: American League
- Ballpark: Sportsman's Park
- City: St. Louis, Missouri
- Record: 43–111 (.279)
- League place: 8th
- Owners: Donald Lee Barnes
- General managers: Bill DeWitt
- Managers: Fred Haney
- Radio: KMOX (France Laux, Cy Casper); KWK (Johnny O'Hara, Jim Bottomley)

The 1939 St. Louis Browns season, team finished eighth in the American League with a record of 43 wins and 111 losses.

== Regular season ==
The Browns lost a franchise record 111 games—not surpassed until the 2018 Baltimore Orioles (the team moved from St. Louis to Baltimore in 1954)—and finished 64.5 games out of first place. The Browns played particularly poorly at home, posting an 18–59 record. The 59 home losses stood as the most in a modern-era major league season until it was matched by the 2019 Detroit Tigers, who went 22–59 at home. Because of the shorter season, the Browns home winning percentage in 1939 (.234) is still the worst in history.

Browns pitching struggled tremendously. The pitchers allowed 739 walks, which was over 100 walks more than the next worse team. The team had an earned run average of 6.01. The next time that a team would have an ERA over 6.00 was the 1996 Detroit Tigers, who had an ERA of 6.38.

=== Season standings ===
American League
Team	W	L	Pct.	GB	Home	Road
New York Yankees	106	45	.702	—	52‍–‍25	54‍–‍20
Boston Red Sox	89	62	.589	17	42‍–‍32	47‍–‍30
Cleveland Indians	87	67	.565	20½	44‍–‍33	43‍–‍34
Chicago White Sox	85	69	.552	22½	50‍–‍27	35‍–‍42
Detroit Tigers	81	73	.526	26½	42‍–‍35	39‍–‍38
Washington Senators	65	87	.428	41½	37‍–‍39	28‍–‍48
Philadelphia Athletics	55	97	.362	51½	28‍–‍48	27‍–‍49
St. Louis Browns	43	111	.279	64½	18‍–‍59	25‍–‍52

=== Record vs. opponents ===
1939 American League record Sources:
Team	BOS	CWS	CLE	DET	NYY	PHA	SLB	WSH
Boston	—	8–14	11–11	10–12	11–8–1	18–4	16–6	15–7
Chicago	14–8	—	12–10	12–10	4–18	11–11	18–4	14–8–1
Cleveland	11–11	10–12	—	11–11	7–15	18–4	16–6	14–8
Detroit	12–10	10–12	11–11	—	9–13	11–11	14–8–1	14–8
New York	8–11–1	18–4	15–7	13–9	—	18–4	19–3	15–7
Philadelphia	4–18	11–11	4–18	11–11	4–18	—	13–9–1	8–12
St. Louis	6–16	4–18	6–16	8–14–1	3–19	9–13–1	—	7–15
Washington	7–15	8–14–1	8–14	8–14	7–15	12–8	15–7	—

=== Notable transactions ===
- May 13, 1939: Red Kress, Beau Bell, Bobo Newsom, and Jim Walkup were traded by the St. Louis Browns to the Detroit Tigers for Vern Kennedy, Bob Harris, George Gill, Roxie Lawson, Chet Laabs, and Mark Christman.

=== Roster ===
1939 St. Louis Browns
Roster
Pitchers: -- Emil Bildilli; 20 Ed Cole; 19 Bill Cox; 19,22 George Gill; -- Loy Hanning; 12,19 Bob Harris; 16 Fred Johnson; 24,33 Vern Kennedy; 21,25,27 Harry Kimberlin; 30 Jack Kramer; 12,17 Roxie Lawson; 14 Johnny Marcum; 20,25,27 Lefty Mills; 33 Bob Muncrief; 12 Bobo Newsom; 9 Ewald Pyle; 17,22 Bill Trotter; 21 Russ Van Atta; 28 Jake Wade; 24 Jim Walkup; 11,14 John Whitehead	Catchers: 10,26 Joe Glenn; 9 Sam Harshany; 25,31 Hal Spindel; Infielders: 8,14 Johnny Berardino; 6,10 Mark Christman; 7 Harlond Clift; 4 Sig Gryska; 1 Don Heffner; 11 Roy Hughes; -- Red Kress; -- Johnny Lucadello; 5 George McQuinn; -- Bob Neighbors	Outfielders: 6 Mel Almada; 10 Beau Bell; 18 Joe Gallagher; 3 Joe Grace; 4,15 Myril Hoag; 3,8 Chet Laabs; 18 Mel Mazzera; -- Moose Solters; 2 Billy Sullivan; 33 Tommy Thompson; Other batters: -- Eddie Silber	Manager: 32 Fred Haney; Coaches: 28 Fred Hofmann; 29 Frank Shellenback

== Player stats ==
=== Batting ===
==== Starters by position ====
Note: Pos = Position; G = Games played; AB = At bats; H = Hits; Avg. = Batting average; HR = Home runs; RBI = Runs batted in

Pos	Player	G	AB	H	Avg.	HR	RBI
C	Joe Glenn	88	286	78	.273	4	29
1B	George McQuinn	154	617	195	.316	20	94
2B	Johnny Berardino	126	468	120	.256	5	58
SS	Don Heffner	110	375	100	.267	1	35
3B	Harlond Clift	151	526	142	.270	15	84
OF	Joe Gallagher	71	266	75	.282	9	40
OF	Myril Hoag	129	482	142	.295	10	75
OF	Chet Laabs	95	317	95	.300	10	62

==== Other batters ====
Note: G = Games played; AB = At bats; H = Hits; Avg. = Batting average; HR = Home runs; RBI = Runs batted in

Player	G	AB	H	Avg.	HR	RBI
Billy Sullivan	118	332	96	.289	5	50
Mark Christman	79	222	48	.216	0	20
Joe Grace	74	207	63	.304	3	22
Sam Harshany	42	145	35	.241	0	15
Mel Almada	42	134	32	.239	1	7
Moose Solters	40	131	27	.206	0	14
Hal Spindel	48	119	32	.269	0	11
Mel Mazzera	33	110	33	.300	3	22
Tommy Thompson	30	86	26	.302	1	7
Sig Gryska	18	49	13	.265	0	8
Red Kress	13	43	12	.279	0	8
Beau Bell	11	32	7	.219	1	5
Johnny Lucadello	9	30	7	.233	0	4
Roy Hughes	17	23	2	.087	0	1
Bob Neighbors	7	11	2	.182	1	1
Eddie Silber	1	1	0	.000	0	0

=== Pitching ===
==== Starting pitchers ====
Note: G = Games pitched; IP = Innings pitched; W = Wins; L = Losses; ERA = Earned run average; SO = Strikeouts

Player	G	IP	W	L	ERA	SO
Jack Kramer	40	211.2	9	16	5.83	68
Vern Kennedy	33	191.2	9	17	5.73	55
Bobo Newsom	6	45.2	3	1	4.73	28
Emil Bildilli	2	19.0	1	1	3.32	8

==== Other pitchers ====
Note: G = Games pitched; IP = Innings pitched; W = Wins; L = Losses; ERA = Earned run average; SO = Strikeouts

Player	G	IP	W	L	ERA	SO
Bill Trotter	41	156.2	6	13	5.34	61
Roxie Lawson	36	150.2	3	7	5.32	43
Lefty Mills	34	144.1	4	11	6.55	103
Bob Harris	28	126.0	3	12	5.71	48
George Gill	27	95.0	1	12	7.11	24
Johnny Marcum	12	47.2	2	5	7.74	14
Jake Wade	4	16.1	0	2	11.02	9
Fred Johnson	5	14.0	0	1	6.43	2
Loy Hanning	4	10.0	0	1	3.60	8
Bill Cox	4	9.1	0	2	9.64	8
Ewald Pyle	6	8.1	0	2	12.96	5
Russ Van Atta	2	7.0	0	0	11.57	6

==== Relief pitchers ====
Note: G = Games pitched; W = Wins; L = Losses; SV = Saves; ERA = Earned run average; SO = Strikeouts

Player	G	W	L	SV	ERA	SO
John Whitehead	26	1	3	1	5.86	9
Harry Kimberlin	17	1	2	0	5.49	11
Ed Cole	6	0	2	0	7.11	5
Bob Muncrief	2	0	0	0	15.00	1
Myril Hoag	1	0	0	0	0.00	0
Jim Walkup	1	0	1	0	0.00	0

== Farm system ==
Level	Team	League	Manager
AA	Toledo Mud Hens	American Association	Myles Thomas
A1	San Antonio Missions	Texas League	Zack Taylor
B	Springfield Browns	Illinois–Indiana–Iowa League	Walter Holke
C	Youngstown Browns	Middle Atlantic League	Billy Urbanski
C	Topeka Owls	Western Association	Bill Wilson
D	Fayetteville Angels	Arkansas–Missouri League	Frank Oceak
D	Lafayette White Sox	Evangeline League	Rod Whitney
D	Mayfield Browns	KITTY League	Bennie Tate
D	Paragould Broncos	Northeast Arkansas League	Elmer Kirchoff
D	Beaver Falls Browns	Pennsylvania State Association	Ralph Goldsmith
D	Lincoln Links	Western League	Pug Griffin

LEAGUE CHAMPIONS: Springfield, Lafayette
