= 1939 Chicago White Sox season =

1939 Chicago White Sox
- League: American League
- Ballpark: Comiskey Park
- City: Chicago
- Owners: J. Louis Comiskey, Grace Comiskey
- General manager: Harry Grabiner
- Managers: Jimmy Dykes
- Radio: WBBM (Pat Flanagan, John Harrington); WCFL (Hal Totten); WJJD (Charlie Grimm, Lew Fonseca); WGN (Bob Elson)

The 1939 Chicago White Sox season was the team's 39th season in major league baseball, and its 40th season overall. They finished with a record of 85–69, good enough for fourth place in the American League, 22 games behind the first place New York Yankees.

== Regular season ==
=== Season standings ===
American League
Team	W	L	Pct.	GB	Home	Road
New York Yankees	106	45	.702	—	52‍–‍25	54‍–‍20
Boston Red Sox	89	62	.589	17	42‍–‍32	47‍–‍30
Cleveland Indians	87	67	.565	20½	44‍–‍33	43‍–‍34
Chicago White Sox	85	69	.552	22½	50‍–‍27	35‍–‍42
Detroit Tigers	81	73	.526	26½	42‍–‍35	39‍–‍38
Washington Senators	65	87	.428	41½	37‍–‍39	28‍–‍48
Philadelphia Athletics	55	97	.362	51½	28‍–‍48	27‍–‍49
St. Louis Browns	43	111	.279	64½	18‍–‍59	25‍–‍52

=== Record vs. opponents ===
1939 American League record Sources:
Team	BOS	CWS	CLE	DET	NYY	PHA	SLB	WSH
Boston	—	8–14	11–11	10–12	11–8–1	18–4	16–6	15–7
Chicago	14–8	—	12–10	12–10	4–18	11–11	18–4	14–8–1
Cleveland	11–11	10–12	—	11–11	7–15	18–4	16–6	14–8
Detroit	12–10	10–12	11–11	—	9–13	11–11	14–8–1	14–8
New York	8–11–1	18–4	15–7	13–9	—	18–4	19–3	15–7
Philadelphia	4–18	11–11	4–18	11–11	4–18	—	13–9–1	8–12
St. Louis	6–16	4–18	6–16	8–14–1	3–19	9–13–1	—	7–15
Washington	7–15	8–14–1	8–14	8–14	7–15	12–8	15–7	—

=== Opening Day lineup ===
- Marv Owen, 3B
- Hank Steinbacher, RF
- Gee Walker, LF
- Luke Appling, SS
- Mike Kreevich, CF
- Joe Kuhel, 1B
- Eric McNair, 2B
- Ken Silvestri, C
- Johnny Rigney, P

=== Roster ===
1939 Chicago White Sox
Roster
Pitchers: 19 Harry Boyles; 26 Clint Brown; 18 Bill Dietrich; 48 Jess Dobernic; 14 Vallie Eaves; 45 Vic Frazier; 17 Art Herring; 24 Jack Knott; 27 Thornton Lee; 16 Ted Lyons; 34 Johnny Marcum; 29 Johnny Rigney; 6 Eddie Smith; 34 John Whitehead	Catchers: 35 Tony Rensa; 36 Norm Schlueter; 14 Ken Silvestri; 15 Merv Shea; Infielders: 4 Luke Appling; 28 Ollie Bejma; 5 Jimmy Dykes; 37 Johnny Gerlach; 37 Jackie Hayes; 2 Bob Kennedy; 3 Joe Kuhel; 47 Eric McNair; 2 Marv Owen	Outfielders: 8 Mike Kreevich; 9 Rip Radcliff; 12 Larry Rosenthal; 46 Hank Steinbacher; 7 Gee Walker; Other batters: 6 Tommy Thompson	Manager: 5 Jimmy Dykes; Coaches: 33 Jimmy Austin; 38 Muddy Ruel; 25 Monty Stratton; 22 Bill Webb

== Player stats ==
=== Batting ===
Note: G = Games played; AB = At bats; R = Runs scored; H = Hits; 2B = Doubles; 3B = Triples; HR = Home runs; RBI = Runs batted in; BB = Base on balls; SO = Strikeouts; AVG = Batting average; SB = Stolen bases

Player	G	AB	R	H	2B	3B	HR	RBI	BB	SO	AVG	SB
Luke Appling, SS	148	516	82	162	16	6	0	56	105	37	.314	16
Ollie Bejma, 2B	90	307	52	77	9	3	8	44	36	27	.251	1
Jimmy Dykes, 3B	2	1	0	0	0	0	0	0	0	0	.000	0
Johnny Gerlach, 3B	3	2	0	2	0	0	0	0	0	0	1.000	0
Jackie Hayes, 2B	72	269	34	67	12	3	0	23	27	10	.249	0
Bob Kennedy, 3B	3	8	0	2	0	0	0	1	0	0	.250	0
Mike Kreevich, CF, 3B	145	541	85	175	30	8	5	77	59	40	.323	23
Joe Kuhel, 1B	139	546	107	164	24	9	15	56	64	51	.300	18
Eric McNair, 3B, 2B, SS	129	479	62	155	18	5	7	82	38	41	.324	17
Marv Owen, 3B	58	194	22	46	9	0	0	15	16	15	.237	4
Rip Radcliff, RF, 1B, LF	113	397	49	105	25	2	2	53	26	21	.264	6
Tony Rensa, C	14	25	3	5	0	0	0	2	1	2	.200	0
Larry Rosenthal, RF, CF	107	324	50	86	21	5	10	51	53	46	.265	6
Norm Schlueter, C	34	56	5	13	2	1	0	8	1	11	.232	2
Ken Silvestri, C	22	75	6	13	3	0	2	5	6	13	.173	0
Hank Steinbacher, RF	71	111	16	19	2	1	1	15	21	8	.171	0
Tommy Thompson, PH	1	0	0	0	0	0	0	1	0	0	.000	0
Mike Tresh, C	119	352	49	91	5	2	0	38	64	30	.259	3
Gee Walker, LF	149	598	95	174	30	11	13	111	28	43	.291	17

Player	G	AB	R	H	2B	3B	HR	RBI	BB	SO	AVG	SB
Harry Boyles, P	2	1	0	0	0	0	0	0	0	1	.000	0
Clint Brown, P	61	19	0	4	0	0	0	3	4	3	.211	0
Bill Dietrich, P	25	37	5	8	3	0	1	2	4	12	.216	0
Jess Dobernic, P	4	1	0	0	0	0	0	0	0	1	.000	0
Vallie Eaves, P	2	6	0	2	0	0	0	1	0	2	.333	0
Vic Frazier, P	10	7	0	2	0	0	0	0	0	3	.286	0
Art Herring, P	7	4	1	0	0	0	0	0	1	1	.000	0
Jack Knott, P	25	53	3	8	0	0	0	1	0	18	.151	0
Thornton Lee, P	33	91	8	15	3	0	0	4	4	18	.165	0
Ted Lyons, P	21	61	5	18	3	0	0	8	5	7	.295	0
Johnny Marcum, P	38	57	7	16	0	0	0	12	5	1	.281	0
Johnny Rigney, P	35	80	4	16	4	0	0	7	2	18	.200	0
Eddie Smith, P	29	52	5	6	1	0	0	3	9	15	.115	0
John Whitehead, P	7	9	0	0	0	0	0	0	0	7	.000	0
Team totals	155	5279	755	1451	220	56	64	679	579	502	.275	113

=== Pitching ===
Note: W = Wins; L = Losses; ERA = Earned run average; G = Games pitched; GS = Games started; SV = Saves; IP = Innings pitched; H = Hits allowed; R = Runs allowed; ER = Earned runs allowed; HR = Home runs allowed; BB = Walks allowed; K = Strikeouts

Player	W	L	ERA	G	GS	SV	IP	H	R	ER	HR	BB	K
Harry Boyles	0	0	10.80	2	0	0	3.1	4	4	4	0	6	1
Clint Brown	11	10	3.88	61	0	18	118.1	127	58	51	8	27	41
Bill Dietrich	7	8	5.22	25	19	0	127.2	134	81	74	15	56	43
Jess Dobernic	0	1	13.50	4	0	0	3.1	3	6	5	0	6	1
Vallie Eaves	0	1	4.63	2	1	0	11.2	11	7	6	1	8	5
Vic Frazier	0	1	10.27	10	1	0	23.2	45	27	27	0	11	7
Art Herring	0	0	5.65	7	0	0	14.1	13	9	9	1	5	8
Jack Knott	11	6	4.15	25	23	0	149.2	157	71	69	13	41	56
Thornton Lee	15	11	4.21	33	29	3	235.0	260	121	110	15	70	81
Ted Lyons	14	6	2.76	21	21	0	172.2	162	71	53	7	26	65
Johnny Marcum	3	3	6.00	19	6	0	90.0	125	66	60	14	19	32
Johnny Rigney	15	8	3.70	35	29	0	218.2	208	103	90	10	84	119
Eddie Smith	9	11	3.67	29	22	0	176.2	161	83	72	11	90	67
John Whitehead	0	3	8.16	7	4	0	32.0	60	30	29	4	5	9
Team totals	85	69	4.31	155	155	21	1377.0	1470	737	659	99	454	535

== Farm system ==
Level	Team	League	Manager
AA	St. Paul Saints	American Association	Babe Ganzel
A1	Shreveport Sports	Texas League	Homer Peel
B	Anniston Rams	Southeastern League	Pee-Wee Wanninger
C	Longview Cannibals/White Sox	East Texas League	John Fitzpatrick
C	Greenville Lions	Alabama–Florida League	Paul Kardow and Howard Taylor
D	Jonesboro White Sox	Northeast Arkansas League	Dutch Welch, Bevo Beavers and Frank Grube
D	Grand Forks Chiefs	Northern League	Johnny Mostil
D	Lubbock Hubbers	West Texas–New Mexico League	Salty Parker

LEAGUE CHAMPIONS: Lubbock
