= 1939 Cleveland Indians season =

1939 Cleveland Indians
- League: American League
- Ballpark: League Park; Cleveland Municipal Stadium
- City: Cleveland, Ohio
- Owners: Alva Bradley
- General managers: Cy Slapnicka
- Managers: Ossie Vitt
- Radio: WCLE (Jack Graney, Pinky Hunter)

The 1939 Cleveland Indians season was a season in American baseball. The team finished third in the American League with a record of 87–67, 20 1/2 games behind the New York Yankees.

== Regular season ==
=== Season standings ===
American League
Team	W	L	Pct.	GB	Home	Road
New York Yankees	106	45	.702	—	52‍–‍25	54‍–‍20
Boston Red Sox	89	62	.589	17	42‍–‍32	47‍–‍30
Cleveland Indians	87	67	.565	20½	44‍–‍33	43‍–‍34
Chicago White Sox	85	69	.552	22½	50‍–‍27	35‍–‍42
Detroit Tigers	81	73	.526	26½	42‍–‍35	39‍–‍38
Washington Senators	65	87	.428	41½	37‍–‍39	28‍–‍48
Philadelphia Athletics	55	97	.362	51½	28‍–‍48	27‍–‍49
St. Louis Browns	43	111	.279	64½	18‍–‍59	25‍–‍52

=== Record vs. opponents ===
1939 American League record Sources:
Team	BOS	CWS	CLE	DET	NYY	PHA	SLB	WSH
Boston	—	8–14	11–11	10–12	11–8–1	18–4	16–6	15–7
Chicago	14–8	—	12–10	12–10	4–18	11–11	18–4	14–8–1
Cleveland	11–11	10–12	—	11–11	7–15	18–4	16–6	14–8
Detroit	12–10	10–12	11–11	—	9–13	11–11	14–8–1	14–8
New York	8–11–1	18–4	15–7	13–9	—	18–4	19–3	15–7
Philadelphia	4–18	11–11	4–18	11–11	4–18	—	13–9–1	8–12
St. Louis	6–16	4–18	6–16	8–14–1	3–19	9–13–1	—	7–15
Washington	7–15	8–14–1	8–14	8–14	7–15	12–8	15–7	—

=== Roster ===
1939 Cleveland Indians
Roster
Pitchers: 15 Johnny Allen; 16 Johnny Broaca; 17 Joe Dobson; 29 Tom Drake; 10 Harry Eisenstat; 19 Bob Feller; 18 Mel Harder; 12 Willis Hudlin; 21 Johnny Humphries; 20 Al Milnar; 30 Mike Naymick; 31 Floyd Stromme; 30 Lefty Sullivan; 14 Bill Zuber	Catchers: 9 Rollie Hemsley; 8 Frankie Pytlak; 2 Luke Sewell; Infielders: 5 Lou Boudreau; 1 Oscar Grimes; 4 Odell Hale; 25 Ken Keltner; 11 Lyn Lary; 6 Ray Mack; 32 Jim Shilling; 7 Hal Trosky; 5 Skeeter Webb	Outfielders: 3 Earl Averill; 23 Bruce Campbell; 2,11 Ben Chapman; 24 Jeff Heath; 6 Moose Solters; 22 Roy Weatherly	Manager: 26 Ossie Vitt; Coaches: 28 Johnny Bassler; 27 Ski Melillo; 2 Luke Sewell

== Player stats ==
= Indicates team leader

=== Batting ===
==== Starters by position ====
Note: Pos = Position; G = Games played; AB = At bats; H = Hits; Avg. = Batting average; HR = Home runs; RBI = Runs batted in

Pos	Player	G	AB	H	Avg.	HR	RBI
C	Rollie Hemsley	107	395	104	.263	2	36
1B	Hal Trosky	122	448	150	.335	25	104
2B	Odell Hale	108	253	79	.312	4	48
SS	Skeeter Webb	81	269	71	.264	2	26
3B	Ken Keltner	154	587	191	.325	13	97
OF	Jeff Heath	121	431	126	.292	14	69
OF	Bruce Campbell	130	450	129	.287	8	72
OF	Ben Chapman	149	545	158	.290	6	82

==== Other batters ====
Note: G = Games played; AB = At bats; H = Hits; Avg. = Batting average; HR = Home runs; RBI = Runs batted in

Player	G	AB	H	Avg.	HR	RBI
Oscar Grimes	119	364	98	.269	4	56
Roy Weatherly	95	323	100	.310	1	32
Lou Boudreau	53	225	58	.258	0	19
Frankie Pytlak	63	183	49	.268	0	14
Ray Mack	36	112	17	.152	1	6
Moose Solters	41	102	28	.275	2	19
Jim Shilling	31	98	27	.276	0	12
Earl Averill	24	55	15	.273	1	7
Luke Sewell	16	20	3	.150	0	1
Lyn Lary	3	2	0	.000	0	0

=== Pitching ===
= Indicates league leader

==== Starting pitchers ====
Note: G = Games pitched; IP = Innings pitched; W = Wins; L = Losses; ERA = Earned run average; SO = Strikeouts

Player	G	IP	W	L	ERA	SO
Bob Feller	39	296.2	24	9	2.85	246
Al Milnar	37	209.0	14	12	3.79	76
Mel Harder	29	208.0	15	9	3.50	67
Johnny Allen	28	175.0	9	7	4.58	79
Willis Hudlin	27	143.0	9	10	4.91	28

==== Other pitchers ====
Note: G = Games pitched; IP = Innings pitched; W = Wins; L = Losses; ERA = Earned run average; SO = Strikeouts

Player	G	IP	W	L	ERA	SO
Tom Drake	8	15.0	0	1	9.00	1
Floyd Stromme	5	13.0	0	1	4.85	4
Lefty Sullivan	7	12.2	0	1	4.26	4
Mike Naymick	2	4.2	0	1	1.93	3

==== Relief pitchers ====
Note: G = Games pitched; W = Wins; L = Losses; SV = Saves; ERA = Earned run average; SO = Strikeouts

Player	G	W	L	SV	ERA	SO
Harry Eisenstat	26	6	7	2	3.30	38
Joe Dobson	35	2	3	1	5.88	27
Johnny Broaca	22	4	2	0	4.70	13
Bill Zuber	16	2	0	0	5.97	16
Johnny Humphries	15	2	4	2	8.26	12

== Awards and honors ==
All Star Game

Bob Feller, pitcher

Rollie Hemsley, catcher

== Farm system ==
Level	Team	League	Manager
AA	Buffalo Bisons	International League	Steve O'Neill
A1	New Orleans Pelicans	Southern Association	Roger Peckinpaugh
A	Wilkes-Barre Barons	Eastern League	Eddie Phillips
B	Cedar Rapids Raiders	Illinois–Indiana–Iowa League	Ollie Marquardt
B	Winston-Salem Twins	Piedmont League	Charles Clancy and Alvin Crowder
B	Spartanburg Spartans	Sally League	Leon Pettit
C	Tyler Trojans	East Texas League	Bobby Goff
C	Springfield Indians	Middle Atlantic League	Earl Wolgamot
D	Troy Trojans	Alabama–Florida League	Bloomer Milner
D	Greeneville Burley Cubs	Appalachian League	Sam Alexander
D	Leaksville-Draper-Spray Triplets	Bi-State League	Arnold Anderson
D	Opelousas Indians	Evangeline League	Joe Woodard
D	Logan Indians	Mountain State League	Eddie Hock
D	Fargo-Moorhead Twins	Northern League	Jack Knight
D	Mansfield Indians	Ohio State League	Ray French and Dewey Stover
D	Niagara Falls Rainbows	PONY League	Tim Murchison
