= 1939 Detroit Tigers season =

Major League Baseball season

1939 Detroit Tigers
- League: American League
- Ballpark: Briggs Stadium
- City: Detroit
- Record: 81–73 (.526)
- League place: 5th
- Owners: Walter Briggs, Sr.
- General managers: Jack Zeller
- Managers: Del Baker
- Radio: WWJ (AM) (Ty Tyson); WXYZ (Harry Heilmann)

The 1939 Detroit Tigers season was a season in American baseball. The team finished fifth in the American League with a record of 81–73, 26 1/2 games behind the New York Yankees.

== Regular season ==
=== Season standings ===
American League
Team	W	L	Pct.	GB	Home	Road
New York Yankees	106	45	.702	—	52‍–‍25	54‍–‍20
Boston Red Sox	89	62	.589	17	42‍–‍32	47‍–‍30
Cleveland Indians	87	67	.565	20½	44‍–‍33	43‍–‍34
Chicago White Sox	85	69	.552	22½	50‍–‍27	35‍–‍42
Detroit Tigers	81	73	.526	26½	42‍–‍35	39‍–‍38
Washington Senators	65	87	.428	41½	37‍–‍39	28‍–‍48
Philadelphia Athletics	55	97	.362	51½	28‍–‍48	27‍–‍49
St. Louis Browns	43	111	.279	64½	18‍–‍59	25‍–‍52

=== Record vs. opponents ===
1939 American League record Sources:
Team	BOS	CWS	CLE	DET	NYY	PHA	SLB	WSH
Boston	—	8–14	11–11	10–12	11–8–1	18–4	16–6	15–7
Chicago	14–8	—	12–10	12–10	4–18	11–11	18–4	14–8–1
Cleveland	11–11	10–12	—	11–11	7–15	18–4	16–6	14–8
Detroit	12–10	10–12	11–11	—	9–13	11–11	14–8–1	14–8
New York	8–11–1	18–4	15–7	13–9	—	18–4	19–3	15–7
Philadelphia	4–18	11–11	4–18	11–11	4–18	—	13–9–1	8–12
St. Louis	6–16	4–18	6–16	8–14–1	3–19	9–13–1	—	7–15
Washington	7–15	8–14–1	8–14	8–14	7–15	12–8	15–7	—

=== Notable transactions ===
- May 13, 1939: Vern Kennedy, Bob Harris, George Gill, Roxie Lawson, Chet Laabs, and Mark Christman were traded by the Tigers to the St. Louis Browns for Red Kress, Beau Bell, Bobo Newsom, and Jim Walkup.

=== Roster ===
1939 Detroit Tigers
Roster
Pitchers: 22 Al Benton; 10 Tommy Bridges; 25 Slick Coffman; 24 Harry Eisenstat; 29 Floyd Giebell; 16 George Gill; 26 Bob Harris; 18 Fred Hutchinson; 11 Vern Kennedy; 23 Roxie Lawson; 27 Red Lynn; 28 Archie McKain; 16 Hal Newhouser; 12 Bobo Newsom; -- Cotton Pippen; 14 Schoolboy Rowe; 11 Bud Thomas; 15 Dizzy Trout; 26 Jim Walkup	Catchers: 8 Dixie Parsons; 30 Merv Shea; 1 Birdie Tebbetts; 4 Rudy York; Infielders: 12 Mark Christman; 3 Frank Croucher; 2 Charlie Gehringer; 5 Hank Greenberg; 6 Pinky Higgins; 23 Red Kress; 27 Benny McCoy; 7 Billy Rogell	Outfielders: 24 Earl Averill; 20 Beau Bell; 19 Roy Cullenbine; 20 Les Fleming; 9 Pete Fox; 17 Chet Laabs; 21 Barney McCosky; 8 Dixie Walker	Manager: 32 Del Baker; Coaches: 17 Gordie Hinkle; 31 Bing Miller; 30 Merv Shea

== Player stats ==
= Indicates team leader

=== Batting ===
==== Starters by position ====
Note: Pos = Position; G = Games played; AB = At bats; H = Hits; Avg. = Batting average; HR = Home runs; RBI = Runs batted in

Pos	Player	G	AB	H	Avg.	HR	RBI
C	Birdie Tebbetts	106	341	89	.261	4	53
1B	Hank Greenberg	138	500	156	.312	33	113
2B	Charlie Gehringer	118	406	132	.325	16	86
SS	Frank Croucher	97	324	87	.269	5	40
3B	Pinky Higgins	132	489	135	.276	8	76
OF	Earl Averill	87	309	81	.262	10	58
OF	Barney McCosky	147	611	190	.311	4	58
OF	Pete Fox	141	519	153	.295	7	66

==== Other batters ====
Note: G = Games played; AB = At bats; H = Hits; Avg. = Batting average; HR = Home runs; RBI = Runs batted in

Player	G	AB	H	Avg.	HR	RBI
Rudy York	102	329	101	.307	20	68
Benny McCoy	55	192	58	.302	1	33
Roy Cullenbine	75	179	43	.240	6	23
Billy Rogell	74	174	40	.230	2	23
Red Kress	51	157	38	.242	1	22
Dixie Walker	43	154	47	.305	4	19
Beau Bell	54	134	32	.239	0	24
Chet Laabs	5	16	5	.313	0	2
Mark Christman	6	16	4	.250	0	0
Les Fleming	8	16	0	.000	0	1
Merv Shea	4	2	0	.000	0	0
Dixie Parsons	5	1	0	.000	0	0

=== Pitching ===
==== Starting pitchers ====
Note: G = Games pitched; IP = Innings pitched; W = Wins; L = Losses; ERA = Earned run average; SO = Strikeouts

Player	G	IP	W	L	ERA	SO
Bobo Newsom	35	246.0	17	10	3.37	164
Tommy Bridges	29	198.0	17	7	3.50	129
Schoolboy Rowe	28	164.0	10	12	4.99	51
Fred Hutchinson	13	84.0	3	6	5.21	22
Vern Kennedy	4	21.0	0	3	6.43	9
Hal Newhouser	1	5.0	0	1	5.40	4

==== Other pitchers ====
Note: G = Games pitched; IP = Innings pitched; W = Wins; L = Losses; ERA = Earned run average; SO = Strikeouts

Player	G	IP	W	L	ERA	SO
Dizzy Trout	33	162.0	9	10	3.61	72
Al Benton	37	150.0	6	8	4.56	67
Archie McKain	32	129.2	5	6	3.68	49
Harry Eisenstat	10	29.2	2	2	6.98	6
Bob Harris	5	18.0	1	1	4.00	9
Cotton Pippen	3	14.0	0	1	7.07	5
Roxie Lawson	2	11.1	1	1	4.76	4
George Gill	3	8.2	0	1	8.31	1

==== Relief pitchers ====
Note: G = Games pitched; W = Wins; L = Losses; SV = Saves; ERA = Earned run average; SO = Strikeouts

Player	G	W	L	SV	ERA	SO
Bud Thomas	27	7	0	1	4.18	14
Slick Coffman	23	2	1	0	6.38	10
Floyd Giebell	9	1	1	0	2.93	9
Jim Walkup	7	0	1	1	7.50	5
Red Lynn	4	0	1	0	8.64	3

== Farm system ==
Level	Team	League	Manager
A1	Beaumont Exporters	Texas League	Al Vincent
C	Hot Springs Bathers	Cotton States League	Conard Fisher
C	Henderson Oilers	East Texas League	Jake Atz
D	Fulton Tigers	KITTY League	Charlie Eckert
D	Newport Canners	Northeast Arkansas League	Clary Harris
D	Tiffin Mud Hens	Ohio State League	Jimmy Lawrence and Al Curry
