= Jim Shilling =

American baseball player (1914–1986)

- Infielder
- Born: May 14, 1914; Tulsa, Oklahoma, U.S.
- Died: September 12, 1986 (aged 72); Tulsa, Oklahoma, U.S.
- Batted: Right Threw: Right

MLB debut
- April 21, 1939, for the Cleveland Indians

Last MLB appearance
- September 30, 1939, for the Philadelphia Phillies

MLB statistics
- Batting average: .282
- Home runs: 0
- Runs batted in: 16
- Stats at Baseball Reference

Teams
- Cleveland Indians (1939); Philadelphia Phillies (1939)

James Robert Shilling (May 14, 1914 – September 12, 1986) was an American professional baseball infielder who played for the 1939 Cleveland Indians and 1939 Philadelphia Phillies of Major League Baseball (MLB). Listed at 5 feet 11 inches (1.80 m) and 175 pounds (79 kg), he threw and batted right-handed.

== Biography ==
Shilling's minor league career spanned 1934 to 1948, with 1192 total games played for eight different teams; he did not play professionally for three seasons (1943–1945) during World War II.

In 1939, Shilling's only season in the major leagues, he played in 31 games for the Cleveland Indians and 11 games for the Philadelphia Phillies, primarily as a second baseman. He registered a .282 batting average with 16 RBIs and no home runs. Defensively, he committed 14 errors in 198 total chances for a .929 fielding percentage.

Born in Tulsa, Oklahoma, in 1914, Shilling served in the United States Navy during World War II. He died in his hometown in 1986 and is buried there.
