= 1939 Boston Red Sox season =

Major League Baseball season

1939 Boston Red Sox
- League: American League
- Ballpark: Fenway Park
- City: Boston, Massachusetts
- Record: 89–62 (.589)
- League place: 2nd
- Owners: Tom Yawkey
- President: Tom Yawkey
- General managers: Eddie Collins
- Managers: Joe Cronin
- Radio: WAAB (Frankie Frisch, Tom Hussey)
- Stats: ESPN.com; Baseball Reference

The 1939 Boston Red Sox season was the 39th season in the franchise's Major League Baseball history. The Red Sox finished second in the American League (AL) with a record of 89 wins and 62 losses, 17 games behind the New York Yankees, who went on to win the 1939 World Series.

== Regular season ==
In 1939, the Boston Red Sox finished 17 games behind the New York Yankees. Lefty Grove won 15 games for the Red Sox while Jimmie Foxx hit .360, and had 35 home runs and 105 RBI. Ted Williams made his major league debut in 1939, and batted .327 with 31 home runs. He led the American League with 145 RBIs. After the first game he played against Williams, Yankees catcher Bill Dickey said about Williams, "He's just a damned good hitter." On July 18, the Red Sox traded then-minor league shortstop Pee Wee Reese to the Brooklyn Dodgers, in exchange for $35,000 and two players to be named later (pitcher Red Evans and outfielder Art Parks). Reese will go on to play with the Dodgers for 16 seasons, where was a ten-time All-Star, and was inducted to the Baseball Hall of Fame in 1984. Reportedly, the Red Sox' incumbent shortstop and player–manager—another Hall of Famer, Joe Cronin, 32—makes the deal because he doesn't want to change positions to make room for Reese.

=== Transactions ===
- July 25: The Red Sox announce the purchase of pitcher Herbert Hash and catcher George Lacy from the Minneapolis Millers of the American Association.
- August 14: The Red Sox announce the purchase of pitcher Wilburn R. Butland from the Minneapolis Millers of the American Association.

=== Season standings ===
American League
Team	W	L	Pct.	GB	Home	Road
New York Yankees	106	45	.702	—	52‍–‍25	54‍–‍20
Boston Red Sox	89	62	.589	17	42‍–‍32	47‍–‍30
Cleveland Indians	87	67	.565	20½	44‍–‍33	43‍–‍34
Chicago White Sox	85	69	.552	22½	50‍–‍27	35‍–‍42
Detroit Tigers	81	73	.526	26½	42‍–‍35	39‍–‍38
Washington Senators	65	87	.428	41½	37‍–‍39	28‍–‍48
Philadelphia Athletics	55	97	.362	51½	28‍–‍48	27‍–‍49
St. Louis Browns	43	111	.279	64½	18‍–‍59	25‍–‍52

=== Record vs. opponents ===
1939 American League record Sources:
Team	BOS	CWS	CLE	DET	NYY	PHA	SLB	WSH
Boston	—	8–14	11–11	10–12	11–8–1	18–4	16–6	15–7
Chicago	14–8	—	12–10	12–10	4–18	11–11	18–4	14–8–1
Cleveland	11–11	10–12	—	11–11	7–15	18–4	16–6	14–8
Detroit	12–10	10–12	11–11	—	9–13	11–11	14–8–1	14–8
New York	8–11–1	18–4	15–7	13–9	—	18–4	19–3	15–7
Philadelphia	4–18	11–11	4–18	11–11	4–18	—	13–9–1	8–12
St. Louis	6–16	4–18	6–16	8–14–1	3–19	9–13–1	—	7–15
Washington	7–15	8–14–1	8–14	8–14	7–15	12–8	15–7	—

=== Opening Day lineup ===
8	Doc Cramer	CF
7	Joe Vosmik	LF
3	Jimmie Foxx	1B
4	Joe Cronin	SS
5	Jim Tabor	3B
9	Ted Williams	RF
1	Bobby Doerr	2B
2	Gene Desautels	C
10	Lefty Grove	P

=== Roster ===
1939 Boston Red Sox
Roster
Pitchers: 13 Elden Auker; 17 Jim Bagby; 16 Emerson Dickman; 11 Denny Galehouse; 10 Lefty Grove; 19 Joe Heving; 15 Bill Lefebvre; 21 Fritz Ostermueller; 15 Woody Rich; 17 Bill Sayles; 12 Jake Wade; 25 Charlie Wagner; 25 Monte Weaver; 18 Jack Wilson	Catchers: 22 Moe Berg; 2 Gene Desautels; 23 Johnny Peacock; Infielders: 6 Boze Berger; 14 Tom Carey; 4 Joe Cronin; 1 Bobby Doerr; 26 Lou Finney; 3 Jimmie Foxx; 5 Jim Tabor	Outfielders: 8 Doc Cramer; 24 Red Nonnenkamp; 7 Joe Vosmik; 9 Ted Williams; Other batters: 26 Fabian Gaffke	Manager: 4 Joe Cronin; Coaches: 22 Moe Berg; 30 Tom Daly (Third base); 31 Hugh Duffy (First base)

== Player stats ==
= Indicates team leader

= Indicates league leader

=== Batting ===
==== Starters by position ====
Note: Pos = Position; G = Games played; AB = At bats; H = Hits; Avg. = Batting average; HR = Home runs; RBI = Runs batted in

Pos	Player	G	AB	H	Avg.	HR	RBI
C	Johnny Peacock	92	274	76	.277	0	36
1B	Jimmie Foxx	124	467	168	.360	35	105
2B	Bobby Doerr	127	525	167	.318	12	73
SS	Joe Cronin	143	520	160	.308	19	107
3B	Jim Tabor	149	577	167	.289	14	95
OF	Joe Vosmik	145	554	153	.276	7	84
OF	Doc Cramer	137	589	183	.311	0	56
OF	Ted Williams	149	565	185	.327	31	145

==== Other batters ====
Note: G = Games played; AB = At bats; H = Hits; Avg. = Batting average; HR = Home runs; RBI = Runs batted in

Player	G	AB	H	Avg.	HR	RBI
Lou Finney	95	249	81	.325	1	46
Gene Desautels	76	226	55	.243	0	21
Tom Carey	54	161	39	.242	0	20
Red Nonnenkamp	58	75	18	.240	0	5
Moe Berg	14	33	9	.273	1	5
Boze Berger	20	30	9	.300	0	2
Fabian Gaffke	1	1	0	.000	0	1

=== Pitching ===
==== Starting pitchers ====
Note: G = Games pitched; IP = Innings pitched; W = Wins; L = Losses; ERA = Earned run average; SO = Strikeouts

Player	G	IP	W	L	ERA	SO
Lefty Grove	23	191.0	15	4	2.54	81
Elden Auker	31	151.0	9	10	3.56	53

==== Other pitchers ====
Note: G = Games pitched; IP = Innings pitched; W = Wins; L = Losses; ERA = Earned run average; SO = Strikeouts

Player	G	IP	W	L	ERA	SO
Jack Wilson	36	177.1	11	11	4.67	80
Fritz Ostermueller	34	159.1	11	7	4.24	61
Denny Galehouse	30	146.2	9	10	4.54	68
Jim Bagby	21	80.0	5	5	7.09	35
Woody Rich	21	77.0	4	3	4.91	24
Jake Wade	20	47.2	1	4	6.23	21
Charlie Wagner	9	38.1	3	1	4.23	13
Bill LeFebvre	5	26.1	1	1	5.81	8

==== Relief pitchers ====
Note: G = Games pitched; W = Wins; L = Losses; SV = Saves; ERA = Earned run average; SO = Strikeouts

Player	G	W	L	SV	ERA	SO
Joe Heving	46	11	3	8	3.70	43
Emerson Dickman	48	8	3	6	4.43	46
Monte Weaver	9	1	0	1	6.64	6
Bill Sayles	5	0	0	0	7.07	9
Jimmie Foxx	1	0	0	0	0.00	1

== Farm system ==
Level	Team	League	Manager
AA	Louisville Colonels	American Association	Donie Bush and Bill Burwell
A1	Little Rock Travelers	Southern Association	Specs Toporcer
A	Scranton Red Sox	Eastern League	Nemo Leibold
B	Rocky Mount Red Sox	Piedmont League	Herb Brett
C	Clarksdale Red Sox	Cotton States League	Leroy "Cowboy" Jones
C	Canton Terriers	Middle Atlantic League	Floyd "Pat" Patterson
D	Elizabethton Betsy Red Sox	Appalachian League	Hobe Brummette
D	Danville-Schoolfield Leafs	Bi-State League	Red Barnes
D	Centreville Colts	Eastern Shore League	Cap Clark (Note: Some sources also list "Dave Coble" as a Centreville manager during 1939. It is unclear if that person may be the Dave Coble who played 15 games with the 1939 Philadelphia Phillies and later managed multiple minor league teams.)

LEAGUE CHAMPIONS: Louisville, Scranton, Canton, Elizabethton, Danville-Schoolfield
