= Marius Russo =

American baseball player (1914-2005)

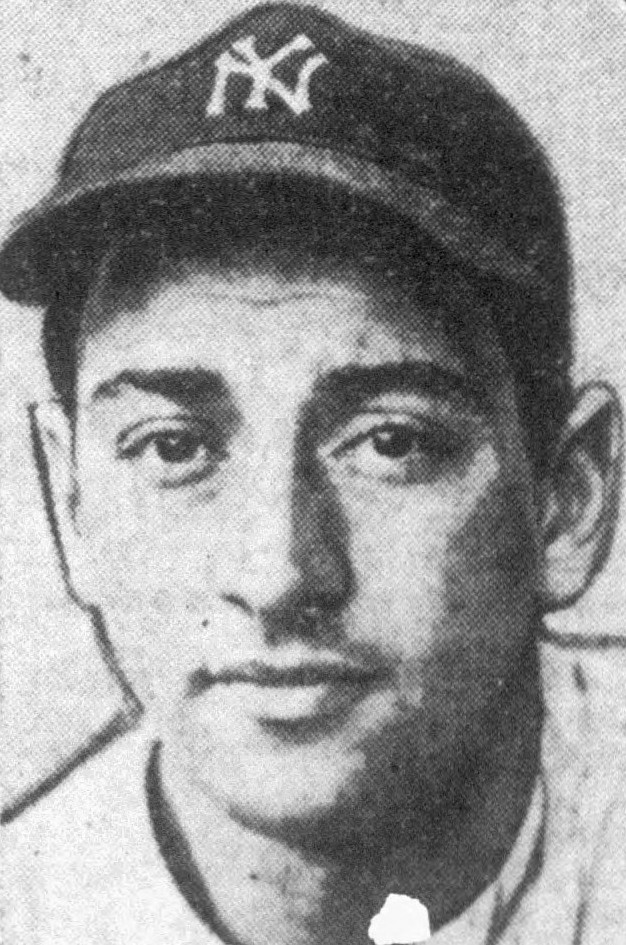
- Russo, circa 1943
- Pitcher
- Born: July 19, 1914; Brooklyn, New York, U.S.
- Died: March 26, 2005 (aged 90); Fort Myers, Florida, U.S.
- Batted: Right Threw: Left

MLB debut
- June 6, 1939, for the New York Yankees

Last MLB appearance
- August 4, 1946, for the New York Yankees

MLB statistics
- Win–loss record: 45–34
- Earned run average: 3.13
- Strikeouts: 311
- Stats at Baseball Reference

Teams
- New York Yankees (1939–1943, 1946)

Career highlights and awards
- All-Star (1941); 2× World Series champion (1941, 1943)

Marius Ugo Russo (July 19, 1914 – March 26, 2005) was an American starting pitcher in Major League Baseball who played for the New York Yankees from 1939 to 1943 and in 1946). He batted right-handed and threw left-handed.

== Profile ==
Russo was born July 19, 1914, in Brooklyn, New York, to Giovanni "John" Russo and Sabina Caolo, both immigrants from Italy. His father was a tailor and his family lived in Queens.

Russo, known as "the Kid From LI", played baseball for Richmond Hill High School in Queens. Later, he attended Brooklyn College and Long Island University in Brooklyn. At LIU, he was a member of the 1935–1936 undefeated team.

== Professional career ==
After graduating, Russo played for the Newark Bears, International League farm team of the Yankees. On June 6, 1939, Russo debuted with the New York Yankees. He gave four years of good services for his team, winning 14 games in both 1940 and 1941, and was their best pitcher in 1941. He also made two postseason starts in the 1941 and 1943 World Series, both complete game wins. He joined the army in 1944, and pitched briefly in 1946.

In his rookie season for New York, he finished with an 8–3 record and a 2.41 earned run average in 116 innings including two shutouts and nine complete games. A noted control ace, in 1940 Russo issued just 55 walks in 189 1/3 innings for a 2.61 walks per nine innings while compiling a 14–8 mark with a 3.28 earned run average and 15 complete games in 24 starts.

Russo enjoyed a career year in 1941. He compiled a 14–10 mark with three shutouts and 27 complete games in 1941. His 3.09 earned run average was the best of the Yankees pitching staff and the 4th best in the American League, being surpassed only by Thornton Lee (2.37), Al Benton (2.97) and Charlie Wagner (3.07). He also led his team in strikeouts (105), games started (27), complete games (17) and innings pitched (209 2/3), and finished second in victories (14) behind Lefty Gomez and Red Ruffing (15 each). In the same season, he pitched a one-hit shutout and made the AL All-Star team.

Russo also started and won a complete game 2–1 victory in the Yankees 1941 World Series win over the Brooklyn Dodgers.

A sore arm limited Russo to pitch only 45 1/3 innings in 1942, ending the season with a 4–1 record and a 2.78 earned run average in nine games (five as a starter). In 1943, he never had control problems, his arm was not hurting, but his fastball was losing velocity while trying to simplify his delivery, and finished 5–10. The Yankees provided him with 3.50 runs per game in offense, near his 3.72 earned run average in that season.

In the 1943 World Series, Russo limited the St. Louis Cardinals to seven hits in Game 4, and helped himself with the bat, hitting two doubles and scored the winning run in the eighth inning as New York won 2–1.

After the 1943 season, Russo served in the U.S. Army Signal Corps in Hawaii. When he returned two years later, he played for the Yankees again briefly.

== Career statistics ==
In a six-season career, Russo posted a 45–34 record with 311 strikeouts and a 3.13 earned run average in 680 2/3 innings. A solid hitter, he went 50-for-235 for a .213 batting average with 25 runs batted in and 23 runs. In the postseason, Russo compiled a 2–0 record with a 0.50 earned run average in two complete games.

== Last years ==
Following his retirement as a player, Russo worked as an expediter for Grumman Aircraft Engineering Corporation in Bethpage, New York. Ending the 1970s, he retired and spent time traveling with his wife, Statia Russo. "We'd take trips to Europe, stay a while in Phoenix and go up to The Berkshires", she said in an interview. The couple moved to Florida in 2001.

Russo died on March 26, 2005 at a hospital near Fort Myers, Florida due to heart issues caused by multiple illnesses. He was 90 years old and survived by his wife, two daughters, three grandchildren and four great-grandchildren. Russo's body was cremated.
