= Hal Spindel =

American baseball player (1913-2002)

- Catcher
- Born: May 27, 1913; Chandler, Oklahoma, U.S.
- Died: July 28, 2002 (aged 89); San Clemente, California, U.S.
- Batted: Right Threw: Right

MLB debut
- April 23, 1939, for the St. Louis Browns

Last MLB appearance
- June 9, 1946, for the Philadelphia Phillies

MLB statistics
- Batting average: .254
- Home runs: 0
- Runs batted in: 20
- Stats at Baseball Reference

Teams
- St. Louis Browns (1939); Philadelphia Phillies (1945–1946)

Harold Stewart Spindel (May 27, 1913 – July 28, 2002) was an American professional baseball catcher who played in 85 games in Major League Baseball catcher as a member of the St. Louis Browns (1939) and Philadelphia Phillies (1945–1946). He was born in Chandler, Oklahoma, but graduated from John C. Frémont High School in Los Angeles and played baseball for UCLA.

Spindel threw and batted right-handed, stood 6 feet (1.8 m) tall and weighed 185 pounds (84 kg). His professional baseball career began in 1934 in the Pacific Coast League. After five years with Seattle, he spent the entire 1939 campaign with the Browns of the American League as the club's third-string catcher, playing in 48 games and starting 26. Three more full years in the minor leagues followed, then he missed the 1943 season. In 1945, he appeared in 36 games for the Phillies, starting 25, third-most on the team. He got into one more MLB contest for Philadelphia, on June 9, 1946, and played in the minors through 1947.

Hal Spindel died at age 89 in San Clemente, California, on July 28, 2002.
