= Tom Drake (baseball) =

American baseball player (1912–1988)

- Pitcher
- Born: August 7, 1912; Birmingham, Alabama, U.S.
- Died: July 2, 1988 (aged 75); Birmingham, Alabama, U.S.
- Batted: Right Threw: Right

MLB debut
- April 24, 1939, for the Cleveland Indians

Last MLB appearance
- September 28, 1941, for the Brooklyn Dodgers

MLB statistics
- Win–loss record: 1–2
- Earned run average: 6.13
- Strikeouts: 13
- Stats at Baseball Reference

Teams
- Cleveland Indians (1939); Brooklyn Dodgers (1941)

Thomas Kendall Drake (August 7, 1912 – July 2, 1988) was an American Major League Baseball right-handed pitcher.

In 1935, Drake started his professional baseball career with the New Orleans Pelicans of the Southern Association. He pitched 15 innings for the Cleveland Indians in 1939 but gave up 15 earned runs and was sent back down to the minors.

In July 1941, Drake had a 9–5 record with the Nashville Vols when the Brooklyn Dodgers acquired him in a trade. He started two games for them, going 1–1. He spent the rest of his career in the minor leagues.
