= Marv Breuer =

American baseball player (1914-1991)

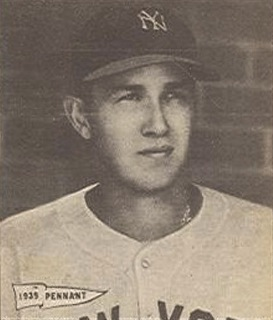
- Pitcher
- Born: April 29, 1914; Rolla, Missouri, U.S.
- Died: January 17, 1991 (aged 76); Rolla, Missouri, U.S.
- Batted: Right Threw: Right

MLB debut
- May 4, 1939, for the New York Yankees

Last MLB appearance
- August 28, 1943, for the New York Yankees

MLB statistics
- Win–loss record: 25–26
- Earned run average: 4.03
- Strikeouts: 226
- Stats at Baseball Reference

Teams
- New York Yankees (1939–1943)

Career highlights and awards
- World Series champion (1941)

Marvin Howard "Baby Face" Breuer (April 29, 1914 – January 17, 1991) was an American pitcher in Major League Baseball. He played for the New York Yankees from 1939 to 1943.

In the 1941 World Series, Breuer came on as a reliever in the fifth inning of Game 4 to relieve Atley Donald, with the Yankees losing 4–3. Breuer pitched three scoreless innings, which enabled the Yankees to ultimately win the game on a passed ball by Mickey Owen. Breuer also pitched in the 1942 World Series, which the Yankees lost to the St. Louis Cardinals.

After Breuer's playing career ended, he spent 31 years working for the United States Geological Survey until his retirement in 1976. He had a wife, Dorothy, two children, three grandchildren, and three great-grandchildren.

Breuer earned a Bachelor of Science degree in civil engineering from the Missouri School of Mines in 1935 and after his baseball career, worked for the United States Geological Survey until retiring in 1976.
