= Floyd Stromme =

American baseball player (1916–1993)

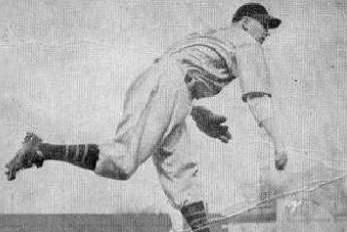
- Stromme in 1940
- Pitcher
- Born: August 1, 1916; Cooperstown, North Dakota
- Died: February 7, 1993 (aged 76); Wenatchee, Washington
- Batted: Right Threw: Right

MLB debut
- July 5, 1939, for the Cleveland Indians

Last MLB appearance
- September 19, 1939, for the Cleveland Indians

MLB statistics
- Win–loss record: 0-1
- Earned run average: 4.85
- Strikeouts: 4
- Stats at Baseball Reference

Teams
- Cleveland Indians (1939)

Floyd Marvin Stromme (August 1, 1916 – February 7, 1993), nicknamed "Rock", was a Major League Baseball pitcher who played in five games for the Cleveland Indians in its 1939 season, going 0–1 with a 4.85 ERA 13 innings pitcher.
