= Eddie Silber =

American baseball player (1914-1976)

- Outfielder
- Born: June 6, 1914; Philadelphia
- Died: October 26, 1976 (aged 62); Dunedin, Florida
- Batted: Right Threw: Right

MLB debut
- September 3, 1937, for the St. Louis Browns

Last MLB appearance
- April 30, 1939, for the St. Louis Browns

MLB statistics
- Batting average: .310
- Home runs: 0
- Runs batted in: 4
- Stats at Baseball Reference

Teams
- St. Louis Browns (1937, 1939)

Edward James Silber (June 6, 1914 – October 26, 1976) was an outfielder in Major League Baseball. He played for the St. Louis Browns.
