= Lynn Nelson (baseball) =

American baseball player (1905–1955)

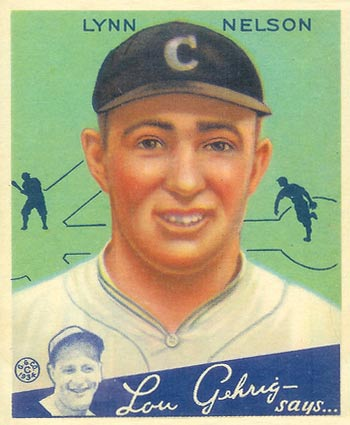
- Nelson 1934 Goudey card
- Pitcher
- Born: February 24, 1905; Sheldon, North Dakota, U.S.
- Died: February 15, 1955 (aged 49); Kansas City, Missouri, U.S.
- Batted: Left Threw: Right

MLB debut
- April 18, 1930, for the Chicago Cubs

Last MLB appearance
- July 3, 1940, for the Detroit Tigers

MLB statistics
- Win–loss record: 33–42
- Earned run average: 5.25
- Strikeouts: 255
- Stats at Baseball Reference

Teams
- Chicago Cubs (1930, 1933–1934); Philadelphia Athletics (1937–1939); Detroit Tigers (1940)

Lynn Bernard Nelson (February 24, 1905 – February 15, 1955) was an American professional baseball pitcher. He played in Major League Baseball (MLB) from 1933 to 1940 for the Chicago Cubs, Philadelphia Athletics, and Detroit Tigers.

Nelson was good with the bat, posting a .281 batting average (103-for-367) with 42 runs, 5 home runs and 55 RBI in 268 games. He also played 6 games at left field.

In the 1937 season he threw an immaculate inning against New York Yankees players Tony Lazzeri, Lefty Gomez, and Frankie Crosetti.

Nelson died February 15, 1955.
