= Joe Gallagher (baseball) =

American baseball player (1914-1998)

- Left fielder
- Born: March 7, 1914; Buffalo, New York, U.S.
- Died: February 25, 1998 (aged 83); Houston, Texas, U.S.
- Batted: Right Threw: Right

MLB debut
- April 20, 1939, for the New York Yankees

Last MLB appearance
- September 29, 1940, for the Brooklyn Dodgers

MLB statistics
- Batting average: .273
- Home runs: 16
- Runs batted in: 73
- Stats at Baseball Reference

Teams
- New York Yankees (1939); St. Louis Browns (1939–1940); Brooklyn Dodgers (1940)

Joseph Emmett Gallagher (March 7, 1914 – February 25, 1998), nicknamed "Muscles", was an American professional baseball left fielder. He played two seasons in Major League Baseball (MLB) for the New York Yankees, St. Louis Browns, and Brooklyn Dodgers between 1939 and 1940.

In 165 games, Gallagher posted a .273 batting average (133-for-487) with 73 runs, 16 home runs and 73 RBIs. He recorded a .950 fielding percentage playing at left and right field.

Born in Buffalo, New York, he attended and played ball for the same high school as Warren Spahn, South Park High School in South Buffalo. He was one of the "Four Joes" of the 1939 New York Yankees, along with Baseball Hall of Famers Joe DiMaggio, Joe McCarthy, and Joe Gordon. His major league career ended after missing the entire 1941–1945 seasons due to military service, though he spent a brief time with the minor league Montreal Royals in 1946. He later coached collegiately, for both the Stephen F. Austin and Rice baseball teams. He died at age 83 in Houston, Texas.

== Pro career ==
In 1936, Gallagher was signed by the New York Yankees and assigned to their affiliate in the Piedmont League, the Norfolk Tars. Gallagher performed well for the team, which was managed by former major leaguer first baseman Johnny Neun. That season, Gallagher played in 142 games, and finished the season with 19 home runs and a .348 batting average. Gallagher began to climb his way up the ladder in the Yankees farm system, eventually playing for their Double-A ball club, the Kansas City Blues. At Kansas City, Gallagher continued to show his power at the plate, leading the team with 24 home runs. He hit two more than teammate Wally Judnich.

In 1939, Gallagher made his debut in the major leagues, which made him briefly a teammate of Lou Gehrig. Gallagher was back-up to outfielder George Selkirk and made his MLB debut April 20, going 0–3 in the Yankees 2–0 win over the Boston Red Sox. On June 13 of his rookie season, the Yankees traded Gallagher to the St. Louis Browns for reserve infielder Roy Hughes. While with St. Louis, Gallagher batted .282 and hit nine home runs while appearing in 71 games. The Browns finished the season in last place.

On May 27, the Browns traded Gallagher to the Brooklyn Dodgers in exchange for Roy Cullenbine, and infielder/outfield. In 1946, at the age 32, Gallagher appeared in six games for the Montreal Royals, where he was teammates with Jackie Robinson. After his brief return, Gallagher retired from baseball.

== College baseball ==
Gallagher's playing career was interrupted by service in the United States Army in 1941 but, by the time his service had ended, he had gained too much weight to continue playing at the Major League level. After returning to North America and playing minor league baseball briefly, Gallagher graduated from Stephen F. Austin State University in 1947, graduated from the University of Houston in 1950 and attended the New York State School of Industrial and Labor Relations at Cornell University in 1951.

In March 1947, he was hired as the head coach of the Stephen F. Austin Lumberjacks baseball team. He held that job through the 1949 season, after which he resigned to attend the University of Houston and was replaced by Paul Geisler. He was named the head coach of the Rice Owls baseball team prior to the 1962 season.

=== Head coaching record ===
Record table
Season	Team	Overall	Conference	Standing	Postseason
Rice Owls (Southwest Conference) (1962)
1962	Rice	10–12	4–9		
Rice:		10–12 (.455)	4–9 (.308)		
Total:		10–12 (.455)			
National champion Postseason invitational champion Conference regular season champion Conference regular season and conference tournament champion Division regular season champion Division regular season and conference tournament champion Conference tournament champion
