= Cotton Pippen =

American baseball player (1911–1981)

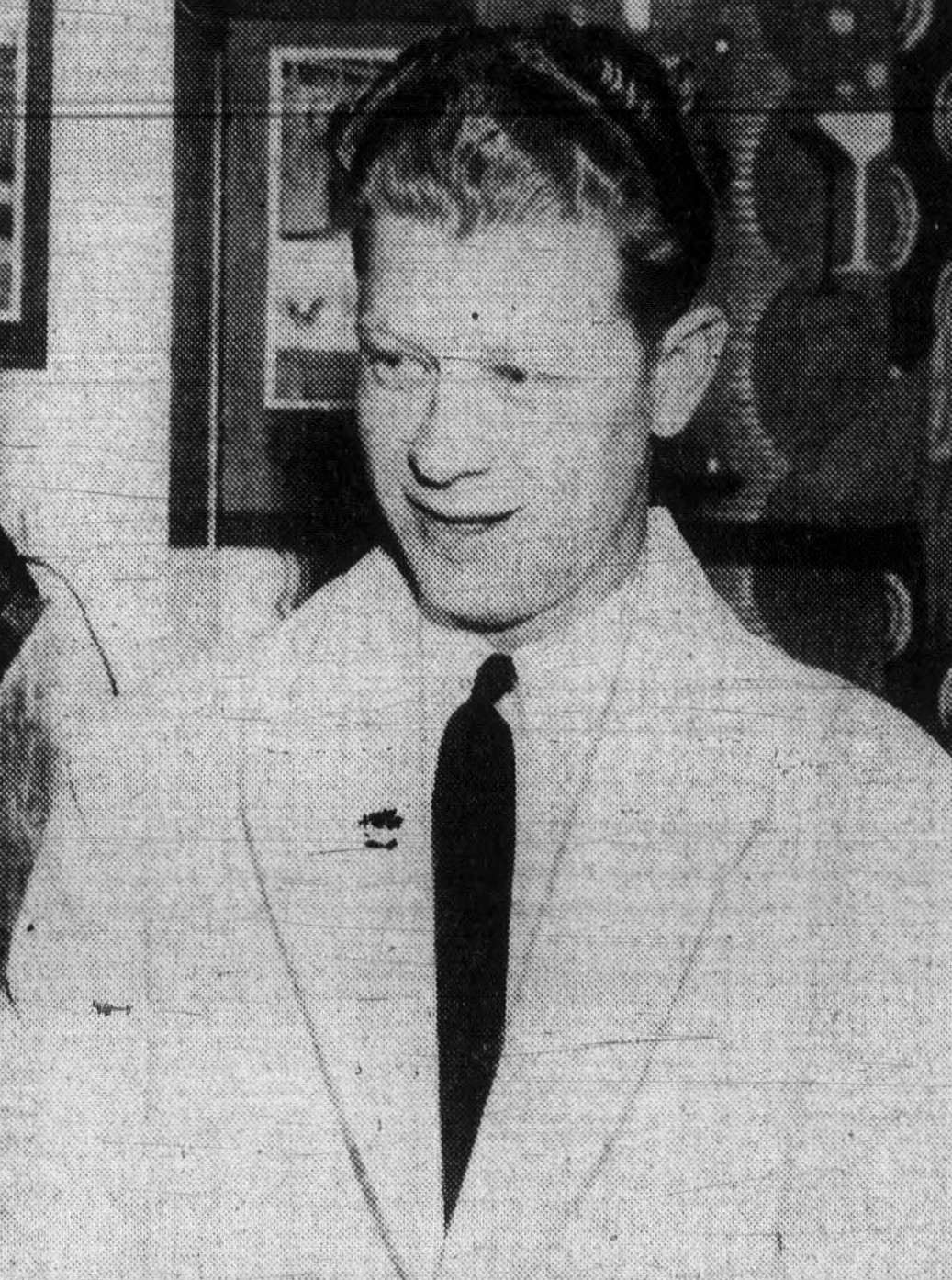
- Pippen, circa 1944
- Pitcher
- Born: April 2, 1911; Cisco, Texas, U.S.
- Died: February 15, 1981 (aged 69); Williams, California, U.S.
- Batted: Right Threw: Right

MLB debut
- August 28, 1936, for the St. Louis Cardinals

Last MLB appearance
- May 21, 1940, for the Detroit Tigers

MLB statistics
- Win–loss record: 5–16
- Earned run average: 6.38
- Strikeouts: 55
- Stats at Baseball Reference

Teams
- St. Louis Cardinals (1936); Philadelphia Athletics (1939); Detroit Tigers (1939–1940)

Henry Harold "Cotton" Pippen (April 2, 1911 – February 15, 1981) was a 6 ft 2 in (1.88 m) American Major League Baseball right-handed pitcher for three years with St. Louis Cardinals (1936), Philadelphia Athletics (1939), and Detroit Tigers (1939–1940). Pippen was born in Cisco, Texas, where his father was a rancher. He was nicknamed "Cotton" because of the color of his light blond hair and blue eyes. Over three seasons in the Major Leagues, Pippen won 5 games and lost 16 with a career earned run average of 6.38. His 12 losses in 1939 was 10th highest in the American League.

In 1936, Pippen struck out Ted Williams in his first professional at bat in the Pacific Coast League. Pippen's minor league career included stints with the Beatrice Blues in the Nebraska State League (1934–35); Houston in the Texas League (1936–1938); Sacramento in the Pacific Coast League (1939); the Oakland Oaks in the Pacific Coast League (1945–1946). He won 20 games for Oakland in 1943.

Pippen served in the military for two years during World War II. he made a comeback after the war and paid for several pro clubs. In 1951, Pippen was the player-manager for Reno. An Oakland newspaper reported in 1954 that Pippen was "now pitching them over the bar at Oscar's on Lakeshore". Pippen reportedly tended bar at a number of establishments in the Oakland area. He died in 1981 at age 69 at a convalescent home in Williams, California.
