= Hank Steinbacher =

American baseball player (1913–1977)

- Outfielder
- Born: March 22, 1913; Sacramento, California, U.S.
- Died: April 3, 1977 (aged 64); Sacramento, California, U.S.
- Batted: Right Threw: Right

MLB debut
- April 21, 1937, for the Chicago White Sox

Last MLB appearance
- October 1, 1939, for the Chicago White Sox

MLB statistics
- Batting average: .292
- Home runs: 6
- Runs batted in: 85
- Stats at Baseball Reference

Teams
- Chicago White Sox (1937–1939)

Henry John Steinbacher (March 22, 1913 – April 3, 1977) was an American professional baseball player who played outfield for the Chicago White Sox from 1937 to 1939 seasons. Before debuting in the major leagues, his contract was purchased by Chicago from the St. Louis Browns. In 1938, his only first full season in the major leagues, his batting average ranked seventh best in the American League. On June 22 of that year, he went 6-for-6 against the Senators in a 16-3 win.

== See also ==
- List of Major League Baseball single-game hits leaders
