= Ken Chase (baseball) =

American baseball player (1913–1985)

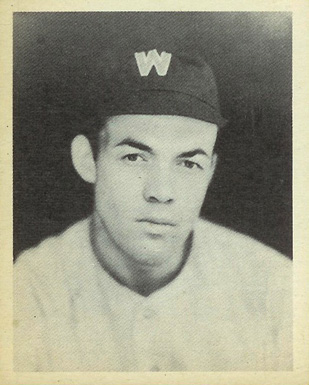
- Pitcher
- Born: October 6, 1913; Oneonta, New York, U.S.
- Died: January 16, 1985 (aged 71); Oneonta, New York, U.S.
- Batted: Left Threw: Left

MLB debut
- April 23, 1936, for the Washington Senators

Last MLB appearance
- October 1, 1943, for the New York Giants

MLB statistics
- Win–loss record: 53–84
- Earned run average: 4.27
- Strikeouts: 582
- Stats at Baseball Reference

Teams
- Washington Senators (1936–1941); Boston Red Sox (1942–1943); New York Giants (1943)

Kendall Fay Chase (October 6, 1913 – January 16, 1985) was an American starting pitcher in Major League Baseball who played for three teams between 1936 and 1943. Listed at 6 feet 2 inches (188 cm) and 210 pounds (95 kg; 15 st 0 lb), Chase batted and threw left-handed. He was born in Oneonta, New York.

A hard-throwing pitcher, Chase entered the majors in 1936 with the Washington Senators, playing six years for them before joining the Boston Red Sox (1942–43) and New York Giants (1943). While in Washington, he was part of a rotation that included Dutch Leonard, Wes Ferrell and Sid Hudson. On April 29, 1939, Ken Chase gave up hit number 2,721 of Lou Gehrig's career. Lou Gehrig never recorded another hit as he willingly pulled himself out of the lineup the next day. He never played another game.

Chase's most productive season came in 1940 with the Senators, when he set career-numbers with 15 wins, a 3.23 ERA, and 129 strikeouts. He struggled with poor control during the season, allowing 143 walks and 12 wild pitches to lead the American League.

In an eight-season career, Chase posted a 53–84 record with 582 strikeouts and a 4.27 ERA in 188 games pitched, including 160 starts 62 complete games, four shutouts, and 1165 innings.

Following his playing retirement, Chase ran a dairy business. He died in his hometown of Oneonta at age of 71.
