= Atley Donald =

American baseball player (1910-1992)

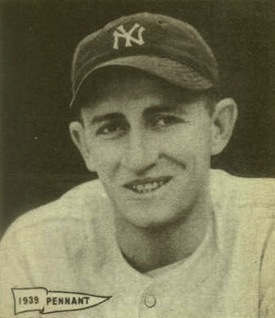
- Pitcher
- Born: August 19, 1910; Morton, Mississippi, U.S.
- Died: October 19, 1992 (aged 82); West Monroe, Louisiana, U.S.
- Batted: Left Threw: Right

MLB debut
- April 21, 1938, for the New York Yankees

Last MLB appearance
- July 13, 1945, for the New York Yankees

MLB statistics
- Win–loss record: 65–33
- Earned run average: 3.52
- Strikeouts: 369
- Stats at Baseball Reference

Teams
- New York Yankees (1938–1945)

Career highlights and awards
- World Series champion (1941)

Richard Atley Donald (August 19, 1910 – October 19, 1992) was an American Major League Baseball pitcher. A native of Morton, Mississippi, the right-hander played for the New York Yankees from 1938 to 1945. "Swampy", as he was nicknamed, stood 6 ft 1 in (1.85 m) and weighed 186 lbs.

Donald was usually a fourth or fifth starter during his career, and sometimes used in relief. The Yankees won two American League pennants while he was on their staff (1941 and 1942), winning the 1941 World Series against the Brooklyn Dodgers.

== Career ==
Donald made his major league debut on April 21, 1938, in a start against the Boston Red Sox at Fenway Park. The Yankees lost 3–2, as Bosox starting pitcher Johnny Marcum earned the win. He started in one more game for New York that season, then returned to the minor league Newark Bears.

Donald was back for good in 1939, and set a league record for consecutive wins by a rookie. On July 25 he defeated the St. Louis Browns 5–1, increasing his record to a perfect 12–0. He finished the season 13–3 with an earned run average of 3.71 and led the league in winning percentage (.813).

He remained a consistent winner throughout the remainder of his career and never had a losing season after going 0–1 in 1938. He finished in the league's top ten twice more for winning percentage (1941 and 1942) with records of 9–5 and 11–3, respectively. In two World Series appearances, however, he was 0–1 with a 7.71 ERA. In 1943 or 44 he was reported to be the fastest pitcher ever, with fast balls measured at 98 mph.

Beset by eye and elbow injuries and now 34 years old, Donald made his last major league appearance on July 13, 1945. His season record was 5–4 with the lowest ERA of his career, 2.97.

Career totals include a 65–33 record (.663) in 153 games pitched, 115 games started, 54 complete games, 6 shutouts, 28 games finished, a save, and an ERA of 3.52. In 932.1 innings pitched he struck out 369 and walked 369. He hit .160 in 356 at bats with a home run and 23 RBI.

== Later life ==
Donald was a Yankee scout for many years after retiring as a player. He retired to a farm in Downsville, Louisiana, near his alma mater where he played college baseball Louisiana Tech. Donald scouted New York Yankee pitcher Ron Guidry and signed him to a contract in 1971. In 1978, as a rookie, Guidry won 13 consecutive games, breaking Donald's American League record of 12 consecutive victories by a rookie set in 1939.

Donald had been batting cancer since 1991 died at Glenwood Regional Medical Center in West Monroe, Louisiana on October 19, 1992. He was 82 years old. His funeral was held at the Alabama Presbyterian Church in Choudrant, Louisiana.
