= Al Milnar =

American baseball player (1913–2005)

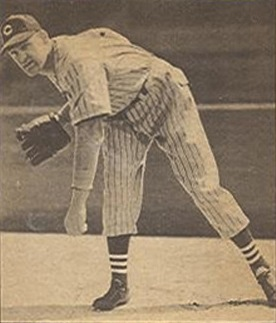
- Pitcher
- Born: December 26, 1913; Cleveland, Ohio, U.S.
- Died: June 30, 2005 (aged 91); Cleveland, Ohio, U.S.
- Batted: Left Threw: Left

MLB debut
- April 30, 1936, for the Cleveland Indians

Last MLB appearance
- June 10, 1946, for the Philadelphia Phillies

MLB statistics
- Win–loss record: 57–58
- Earned run average: 4.22
- Strikeouts: 350
- Stats at Baseball Reference

Teams
- Cleveland Indians (1936, 1938–1943); St. Louis Browns (1943, 1946); Philadelphia Phillies (1946)

Career highlights and awards
- All-Star (1940)

Albert Joseph Milnar (December 26, 1913 – June 30, 2005) was an American starting pitcher in Major League Baseball who played for the Cleveland Indians (1936, 1938–1943), St. Louis Browns (1943, 1946) and Philadelphia Phillies (1946). Milnar batted and threw left-handed. He was born in Cleveland, Ohio.

In an eight-season career, Milnar posted a 57–58 record with 350 strikeouts and a 4.18 ERA in 1043 innings pitched, including 127 starts, 49 complete games, 10 shutouts and seven saves. Milnar is notable for giving up the single that extended Joe DiMaggio's hitting streak to 56 games at League Park in 1941.

Milnar was a better than average hitting pitcher, posting a .203 batting average (79-for-390) with 41 runs, 4 home runs, 29 RBI and drawing 15 bases on balls.

During the 1940 season, Milnar was taught how to throw a slider by teammate Johnny Allen. However, Milnar injured his shoulder throwing the slider during the 1941 season, and his career suffered as a result. Milnar later stated, "If I had left well enough alone, my career probably would have been much better... it was a pitch I should not have used."

On August 11, 1942, Milnar came within one out of a no-hitter, but it was broken up with two outs in the ninth inning by Doc Cramer. The game ended up a scoreless tie after 14 innings, with Milnar pitching the entire game.

Milnar went in the US Army before the start of the 1944 season, where he served as an NCO in the Pacific Theatre.

After baseball, Milnar worked for 22 years as a security guard for Fisher Body.

Milnar died in his hometown of Cleveland at the age of 91.
