= Jack Knott =

American baseball player (1907–1981)

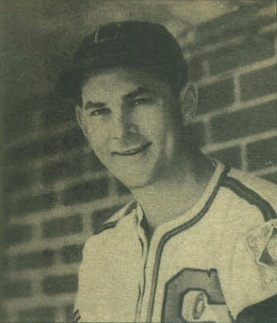
- Pitcher
- Born: March 2, 1907; Dallas, Texas, U.S.
- Died: October 13, 1981 (aged 74); Brownwood, Texas, U.S.
- Batted: Right Threw: Right

MLB debut
- April 13, 1933, for the St. Louis Browns

Last MLB appearance
- May 15, 1946, for the Philadelphia Athletics

MLB statistics
- Win–loss record: 82–103
- Earned run average: 4.97
- Strikeouts: 484
- Stats at Baseball Reference

Teams
- St. Louis Browns (1933–1938); Chicago White Sox (1938–1940); Philadelphia Athletics (1941–1942, 1946)

John Henry Knott (March 2, 1907 – October 13, 1981) was an American professional baseball pitcher with the St. Louis Browns (1933–1938), Chicago White Sox (1938–1940) and Philadelphia Athletics (1941–1942, 1946) of Major League Baseball. Knott batted and threw right-handed. He was born in Dallas, Texas.

He led the American League in saves (7) in 1935 and earned runs allowed (156) in 1936, and home runs allowed (25) in 1937. In 11 seasons he had an 82–103 win–loss record in 325 games, with 192 games started, 62 complete games, 4 shutouts, 19 saves, 484 strikeouts, and a 4.97 ERA.

Knott served in the military during World War II, and he was wounded on January 10, 1945, during the Battle of the Bulge.

He was an alumnus of Southern Methodist University and died in Brownwood, Texas, at the age of 74.

== See also ==
- List of Major League Baseball annual saves leaders
