= Lefty Sullivan =

American baseball player (1916–1988)

- Pitcher
- Born: September 7, 1916; Nashville, Tennessee
- Died: November 1, 1988 (aged 72); Scottsdale, Arizona
- Batted: Left Threw: Left

MLB debut
- May 6, 1939, for the Cleveland Indians

Last MLB appearance
- August 3, 1939, for the Cleveland Indians

MLB statistics
- Win–loss record: 0–1
- Earned run average: 4.26
- Strikeouts: 4
- Stats at Baseball Reference

Teams
- Cleveland Indians (1939)

Paul Thomas "Lefty" Sullivan (September 7, 1916 – November 1, 1988) was a Major League Baseball pitcher. Sullivan played for the Cleveland Indians in 1939. In seven career games, he had a 0–1 record, with a 4.26 ERA. He batted and threw left-handed.

Sullivan was born in Nashville, Tennessee and died in Scottsdale, Arizona.
