= Lefty Mills =

American baseball player (1912–1982)

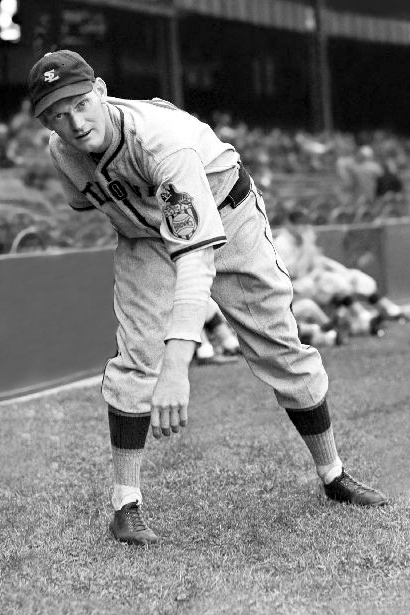
- Pitcher
- Born: May 10, 1912; Dedham, Massachusetts, U.S.
- Died: September 23, 1982 (aged 70); Riverside, California, U.S.
- Batted: Left Threw: Left

MLB debut
- June 10, 1934, for the St. Louis Browns

Last MLB appearance
- August 29, 1940, for the St. Louis Browns

MLB statistics
- Win–loss record: 15–30
- Earned run average: 6.06
- Strikeouts: 267
- Stats at Baseball Reference

Teams
- St. Louis Browns (1934, 1937–40)

Howard Robinson "Lefty" Mills (May 10, 1912 – September 23, 1982) was an American Major League Baseball pitcher. He played all or part of five seasons in the majors, between 1934 and 1940, for the St. Louis Browns. He was a native of Dedham, Massachusetts.
