= Bob Harris (baseball) =

American baseball player (1915–1989)

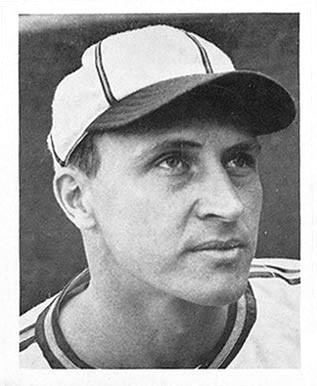
- Pitcher
- Born: May 1, 1915; Gillette, Wyoming, U.S.
- Died: August 8, 1989 (aged 74); North Platte, Nebraska, U.S.
- Batted: Right Threw: Right

MLB debut
- September 19, 1938, for the Detroit Tigers

Last MLB appearance
- September 16, 1942, for the Philadelphia Athletics

MLB statistics
- Win–loss record: 30–52
- Earned run average: 4.96
- Strikeouts: 205
- Stats at Baseball Reference

Teams
- Detroit Tigers (1938–1939); St. Louis Browns (1939–1942); Philadelphia Athletics (1942)

Robert Arthur Harris (May 1, 1915 – August 8, 1989) was an American professional baseball pitcher. He played in Major League Baseball (MLB) from 1938 to 1942 for the Detroit Tigers, St. Louis Browns, and Philadelphia Athletics. He was the first Wyoming-born player in Major League history.

He finished in the top ten in losses three seasons in a row.
