= Thornton Lee =

American baseball player (1906–1997)

- Pitcher
- Born: September 13, 1906; Sonoma, California, U.S.
- Died: June 9, 1997 (aged 90); Tucson, Arizona, U.S.
- Batted: Left Threw: Left

MLB debut
- September 19, 1933, for the Cleveland Indians

Last MLB appearance
- June 18, 1948, for the New York Giants

MLB statistics
- Win–loss record: 117–124
- Earned run average: 3.56
- Strikeouts: 937
- Stats at Baseball Reference

Teams
- Cleveland Indians (1933–1936); Chicago White Sox (1937–1947); New York Giants (1948)

Career highlights and awards
- 2× All-Star (1941, 1945); AL ERA leader (1941)

Thornton Starr Lee (September 13, 1906 – June 9, 1997), nicknamed "Lefty", was an American professional baseball starting pitcher in Major League Baseball who played for the Cleveland Indians (1933–36), Chicago White Sox (1937–47) and New York Giants (1948). Lee batted and threw left-handed. He is the father of pitcher Don Lee.

== Career ==
Lee was born in Sonoma, California. He attended Arroyo Grande High School in San Luis Obispo County from 1923 to 1925 then went on to play football, basketball, baseball and track at California Polytechnic (Cal Poly) in San Luis Obispo. Lee first pitched professionally at the age of 24, reaching the major leagues on September 19, 1933, six days after his 28th birthday, with the Cleveland Indians.

Before the 1937 season, he was part of a three-team trade among the Indians, Chicago White Sox and Washington Senators. Jack Salveson went to the Senators, while Earl Whitehill went to the Indians. Lee landed in Chicago and went on to pitch for the White Sox for the next eleven years.

In his first four years with the Sox, Lee won 12 or more games, with a high 15 victories in 1939. His most productive season came in 1941, when he paced all American League pitchers in ERA (2.34) and complete games (30). He also posted a career-high 22 victories (second only to Bob Feller's 25), 125 strikeouts (also a career-high), was named to the AL All-Star team, and collected a $2,500 bonus for winning more than 20 games.

From 1942 to 1945, Lee suffered a string of injuries and lost his pace. After fracturing his arm and undergoing two bone chip removals and a neck operation, he recovered his old form in 1945, going 15–12 with a 2.44 ERA and 108 strikeouts, and pitching in the All-Star game for the second time.

At the age of 42, Lee divided his time in 1948 between the National League, with the Giants, and the Pacific Coast League, where he contributed to the Oakland Oaks pennant championship. He retired at the end of the season.

Lee had a .200 batting average (167-for-835) with 63 runs, 4 home runs and 66 RBI in 375 games. All four of his career home runs came as a member of the 1938 Chicago White Sox.

California Polytechnic University inducted Lee into their Hall of Fame on November 4, 1988. Lee died from complications of Parkinson's disease on June 9, 1997 in Tucson, Arizona at the age of 90.

== Fact ==
- On September 17, 1939, Ted Williams hit a home run off Thornton Lee, one of 31 homers he hit in his rookie season. Williams hit a home run off Thornton's son, Don Lee, of the Senators, on September 2, 1960, thus becoming the only player in major league history to hit a home run off a father and son.

== See also ==
- List of Major League Baseball annual ERA leaders
- Van Lingle Mungo (song)
