= Vern Kennedy =

American baseball player (1907–1993)

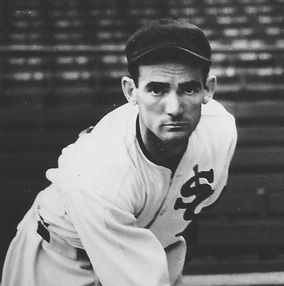
- Kennedy, circa 1936
- Pitcher
- Born: March 20, 1907; Kansas City, Missouri, U.S.
- Died: January 28, 1993 (aged 85); Mendon, Missouri, U.S.
- Batted: Left Threw: Right

MLB debut
- September 18, 1934, for the Chicago White Sox

Last MLB appearance
- September 27, 1945, for the Cincinnati Reds

MLB statistics
- Win–loss record: 104–132
- Earned run average: 4.67
- Strikeouts: 691
- Stats at Baseball Reference

Teams
- Chicago White Sox (1934–1937); Detroit Tigers (1938–1939); St. Louis Browns (1939–1941); Washington Senators (1941); Cleveland Indians (1942–1944); Philadelphia Phillies (1944–1945); Cincinnati Reds (1945)

Career highlights and awards
- 2× All-Star (1936, 1938); Pitched a no-hitter on August 31, 1935

Lloyd Vernon Kennedy (March 20, 1907 – January 28, 1993) was an American professional baseball pitcher who played in Major League Baseball for the Chicago White Sox, Detroit Tigers, St. Louis Browns, Washington Senators, Cleveland Indians, Philadelphia Phillies and Cincinnati Reds. Kennedy batted left-handed and threw right-handed. He was born in Kansas City, Missouri. Kennedy attended college at what is now known as the University of Central Missouri, where the football field bears his name.

While pitching for the Chicago White Sox, Kennedy threw the first no-hitter in Comiskey Park, a 5–0 shutout over Cleveland on August 31, 1935. His most productive season came in 1936, when he posted career-highs in wins (21), innings pitched (274 1/3) and complete games (20). A competent hitting-pitcher, he compiled a .244 average (181-for-743) with 36 extra base hits, including four home runs and 61 RBI. He also made the American League All-Star team in 1936 and 1938. In a 12-season career, Kennedy posted a 104–132 record with 691 strikeouts and a 4.67 ERA in 2025 2/3 innings.

Kennedy died in Mendon, Missouri, at the age of 85 after a shed (smokehouse) roof collapsed on him.

== See also ==
- List of Major League Baseball no-hitters

Achievements
Preceded by Paul Dean	No-hitter pitcher August 31, 1935	Succeeded by Bill Dietrich
