= Johnny Marcum =

American baseball player (1909–1984)

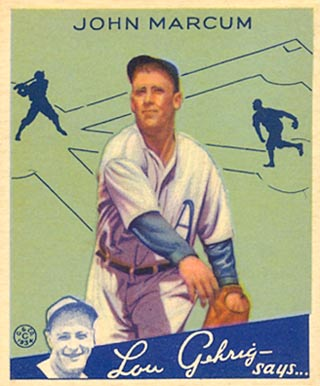
- Pitcher
- Born: September 9, 1909; Campbellsburg, Kentucky, U.S.
- Died: September 10, 1984 (aged 75); Louisville, Kentucky, U.S.
- Batted: Left Threw: Right

MLB debut
- September 7, 1933, for the Philadelphia Athletics

Last MLB appearance
- September 30, 1939, for the Chicago White Sox

MLB statistics
- Win–loss record: 65–63
- Earned run average: 4.66
- Strikeouts: 392
- Stats at Baseball Reference

Teams
- Philadelphia Athletics (1933–1935); Boston Red Sox (1936–1938); St. Louis Browns (1939); Chicago White Sox (1939)

John Alfred Marcum (September 9, 1909 – September 10, 1984), nicknamed "Footsie" and "Moose", was an American professional baseball player. He was a pitcher for seven seasons in Major League Baseball (MLB) with the Philadelphia Athletics, Boston Red Sox, St. Louis Browns, and Chicago White Sox. Over seven seasons, he had a 65–63 record and a 4.66 earned run average (ERA).

Growing up in Kentucky, Marcum's professional career started after Bill Neal, the manager of the Louisville Colonels, saw him pitching and signed him to a contract. Marcum entered the major leagues late in the 1933 season with the Athletics, compiling a record of 3–2 in five appearances. He spent the next two years with the Athletics as one of their main starting pitchers, posting records of 14–11 in 1934 and 17–12 in 1935, a season in which he received votes for the Most Valuable Player in the American League. Before the 1936 season, Marcum was traded to the Red Sox, who were spending a great deal of money in hopes of improving. Marcum spent 1936–1938 with Boston, but he and other acquisitions failed to live up to expectations. After splitting 1939 between the Browns and the White Sox, Marcum pitched in the minor leagues for several more seasons before retiring. Following his baseball career, he returned to Kentucky, tending a 165-acre farm in Eminence.

== Early life ==
John Alfred Marcum was born on September 9, 1909, in Campbellsburg, Kentucky. His parents, Ben and Grace, were of American and Irish descent, the athlete later recalled. In addition to a brother, Tillman, who was seven years his senior, Johnny had three younger siblings. His first home was his family's Campbellsburg farm, but when he was three, the Marcums moved closer to Eminence to work on a tenant farm.

Ben had a local reputation as a standout baseball pitcher in semipro ball. Sometimes on weekends, he would give his sons time off from their tasks to play a contest. "As a pitcher I don't mind saying that I could always fool the kids around the farm," Marcum recollected in 1935. "Maybe that's why they made me go to the outfield now and then."

== Early minor league career ==
=== Dayton Aviators (1929–1930) ===
In 1927, Bill Neal, who managed the Louisville Colonels of the Class AA American Association, saw Marcum pitching and signed him to a contract. Reports indicate that Marcum spent much of the 1928 season pitching batting practice for Louisville and playing occasional games as an outfielder. Statistics for him are unrecorded. A March article by The Courier-Journal said that his delivery of a baseball "strongly resembles the throwing of a corncob at a cow by a rheumatic woman in December", though the article also noted that he was a hard thrower. Louisville optioned him to the Dayton Aviators, a Class B team, in 1929. In 39 games for the Aviators, Marcum had a 9–19 record, a 5.37 earned run average (ERA), 109 strikeouts, 83 walks, and 326 hits allowed in 285 innings pitched. His 19 losses led the Central League, and his 326 hits allowed ranked second to Alex McColl's 339.

Marcum spent most of the 1930 season with Dayton. In 22 games as a pitcher, he had a 6–9 record, a 5.75 ERA, and 179 hits allowed in 130 innings pitched. However, he also played 55 games in the outfield. As a hitter, he batted .421 with 114 hits and 17 home runs. Promoted to Louisville late in the year, he won four of the five games he pitched, while also batting .395. Used as a right fielder in the Little World Series, Marcum had at least one hit in all eight games, though the Colonels lost the series to the Rochester Red Wings.

=== Louisville Colonels (1931–1933) ===
In 1931, Marcum spent the whole season with Louisville, again playing the outfield on days he was not pitching. In 35 games pitched, he had an 8–14 record, a 5.63 ERA, and 229 hits allowed in 168 innings pitched. Though his batting totals were lower than what they had been in Dayton, he still hit .296 with seven home runs. Despite this, manager Allen Sothoron thought Marcum was too slow to reach the major leagues as an outfielder, and he used him strictly as a pitcher the following season.

Pitching 34 games in 1932, Marcum posted an 8–9 record and 154 hits allowed in 130 innings. However, he had what biographer Bill Nowlin termed a "breakout year" in 1933. Making 37 appearances, Marcum posted a 20–13 record and a 3.74 ERA, allowing 278 hits in 272 innings. Though the Colonels finished last in the American Association's East Division, Marcum's 20 wins were third in the league, behind only Paul Dean's 22 and Bill Lee's 21.

== Major league career ==
=== Philadelphia Athletics ===
==== 1933 ====
During the 1933 season, Earle Mack, a scout for the Philadelphia Athletics, attended a series between Louisville and the St. Paul Saints, attempting to find his team another pitcher. The hurler he went to see had just injured his foot and was not throwing as hard as normal, but Mack was impressed with Marcum and returned a favorable report. Around this time, the Colonels mailed a letter to all 16 of the major league teams, offering Marcum's contract to the highest bidder. Philadelphia won the bidding on August 20 with an offer of either $25,000 or $30,000, later sending Jim Peterson to the Saints to complete the transaction on September 30.

Marcum made his major league debut on September 7 at Philadelphia's Shibe Park, holding the Cleveland Indians to five hits and pitching a shutout in a 6–0 victory. His second start was a five-hit shutout as well, against the Chicago White Sox. In five starts, Marcum had a 3–2 record, a 1.95 ERA, 14 strikeouts, 20 walks, and 28 hits allowed in 37 innings pitched.

==== 1934 ====
By 1934, Marcum had acquired nicknames. The New York World-Telegram reported in April that he was commonly called "Footsie" because his feet were supposed to be among baseball's largest. "Moose" was another nickname of his. His season got off to an unsuccessful start, as he lost six decisions before picking up his first win on June 17, posting a 6.01 ERA in that span. Beginning with the win, he posted a 14–5 record and a 3.66 ERA over the remainder of the season. On August 18, he allowed eight hits but no runs in a 9–0 shutout of the Washington Senators. A second shutout came in the second game of a doubleheader on September 16, in which he allowed seven hits in a 2–0 victory over the St. Louis Browns. In 37 games (31 starts), he had a 14–11 record, a 4.50 ERA, 92 strikeouts, 88 walks, and 257 hits in 232 innings pitched. Despite his slow start, he ended the year with more wins than any other Athletic. His 92 strikeouts were the ninth-best total in the American League (AL).

==== 1935 ====
Marcum waited a while to sign his contract for 1935, hoping for more money. He began the season as the number two starter for the Athletics, behind Sugar Cain in the rotation. In Marcum's fourth start of the year, on May 17, he held the Browns to four hits in an 8–0 shutout victory. He had a busy day on June 20. Slated to pitch the second game of a doubleheader against the White Sox at Comiskey Park, he was relaxing in the clubhouse during the first game, when a teammate informed him that his manager wanted him to pinch hit in that contest. Marcum made the long journey from the clubhouse to home plate, where he was handed a bat to save time. He hit a game-tying single against John Whitehead, left the game in favor of a pinch runner, and returned to the clubhouse as Philadelphia rallied to win 5–3. Then, Marcum pitched 11 1/3 innings in the second game, his longest outing of the year, suffering the loss in a 2–1 defeat. On July 23, he was "invincible with men on base", according to the Associated Press, as he threw an eight-hit shutout in a 2–0 victory over the White Sox. During the season, Marcum set career bests in many categories, including wins (17), ERA (4.08), strikeouts (99), and innings pitched (242 2/3). His 17 wins were the seventh-best total in the AL, and they easily led the last-place Athletics, as no other Philadelphia pitcher won more than nine games. His 99 strikeouts were also the eighth-best total in the AL. With 4% of the votes, Marcum and teammate Pinky Higgins tied for 20th in AL Most Valuable Player (MVP) voting. Following the season, on December 6, he was traded to the Boston Red Sox for Gordon Rhodes, George Savino, and $150,000.

=== Boston Red Sox ===
==== 1936 ====
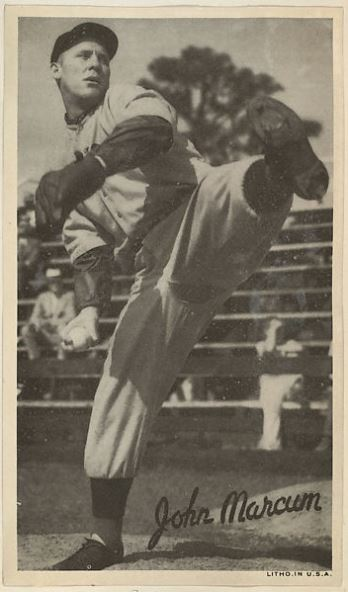
1936 Goudey baseball card of Marcum

W.P. Dozier Jr., sports editor of the Sarasota Herald, wrote before the 1936 season that the Red Sox would be "bolstered by the purchase of such stars as Jimmy Foxx, Heinie Manush, and Johnny Marcum." Marcum again delayed signing his contract, hoping for a $10,000 salary, though he settled for $7,500. The start of his season was delayed slightly due to a sore arm, treated by a tonsillectomy, a common remedy of the period. A win over the Browns on July 28 evened Marcum's record at 6–6, but he won only two of his final nine decisions. After Marcum failed to hold the lead in the first game of a doubleheader against the Athletics on August 19, The Telegraph wrote that "the Yawkey bankroll seems to have produced a set of elbowers that have failed so completely that [the] Red Sox are playing exactly .500 ball today ... and have sunk to sixth place [out of eight teams]." He did throw one shutout, limiting the White Sox to seven hits in the second game of a September 3 doubleheader as Boston prevailed 5–0. In 31 games (23 starts), he had an 8–13 record, a 4.81 ERA, 57 strikeouts, 52 walks, and 194 hits allowed in 174 innings pitched.

==== 1937 ====
Marcum won his first four decisions of 1937. On May 27, he threw a six-hit shutout in a 7–0 victory over the Senators. A wrist sprain cost him three weeks of action in June. He pitched 11 innings in the second game of a doubleheader on July 10, besting his old team by a 5–2 score. In 37 games (23 starts), he had a 13–11 record, a 4.85 ERA, 59 strikeouts, 47 walks, and 230 hits allowed in 183 2/3 innings. Nowlin noted that while his ERA was similar to the previous year, his win–loss record was much improved. Following the season, in its assessment of Marcum and several other veterans the Red Sox had acquired over the years, the Courier-Post reported that "none has set the world on fire since going to Boston".

==== 1938 ====
Before the 1938 season, manager Joe Cronin anticipated that Marcum would have a better season. The pitcher speculated that he might win 20 games. He won three of his first four decisions, posting a 3–1 record and a 2.75 ERA through May 6. However, his ERA rose after that, ascending to 4.57 in his next three games. By the end of June, his record was 5–6. He did not pitch for the Red Sox after July 15, sidelined by arm trouble. In 15 games (11 starts), he had posted a 5–6 record, a 4.09 ERA, 25 strikeouts, 25 walks, and 113 hits allowed in 92 1/3 innings. On August 2, the Red Sox sent him and $20,000 to the Buffalo Bisons of the Class AA International League for Bill Harris. In 10 starts for the Bisons, Marcum had a 6–3 record, a 4.28 ERA, 24 strikeouts, nine walks, and 72 hits allowed in 61 innings. Following the season, the Red Sox regained his contract, only to trade him to the St. Louis Browns on December 6 for Tom Carey.

=== St. Louis Browns/Chicago White Sox ===
Nowlin wrote that Marcum "struggled badly" with the Browns. In 12 games (six starts), he had a 2–5 record, a 7.74 ERA, 14 strikeouts, 10 walks, and 66 hits allowed in 47 2/3 innings. On June 2, in an exchange of two pitchers in the midst of poor seasons, Marcum was traded to the White Sox for John Whitehead.

After allowing one run in 7 1/3 innings of relief in his first game with the White Sox, Marcum won three appearances in a row, from June 23 through July 4. Thereafter, he would not win another game. In a relief outing against the Detroit Tigers on August 9, he was hit above the right eye by a line drive off the bat of Hank Greenberg. The injury required four stitches, and he did not pitch again until August 22. His final appearance came against the Browns in the first game of a September 30 doubleheader; he pitched five scoreless innings of relief but had a no decision in a 5–1 loss. In 19 games for Chicago (six starts), he had a 3–3 record, a 6.00 ERA, 32 strikeouts, 19 walks, and 125 hits allowed in 90 innings. His combined totals between the teams were a 5–8 record, a 6.60 ERA, 46 strikeouts, 29 walks, and 191 hits allowed in 137 2/3 innings pitched over 31 games (12 starts).

== Later minor league career ==
=== Toledo Mud Hens (1940–1942) ===
The Browns reacquired Marcum's contract on December 15, 1939, but they assigned him to their top affiliate, the American Association's Toledo Mud Hens, for the next three seasons. In 36 games (29 starts) for Toledo in 1940, he had a 13–12 record and a 5.21 ERA, ranking fifth in the American Association in innings pitched. The following year, in 30 games (25 starts), he had a 17–7 record with 61 strikeouts and 40 walks. His 17 wins ranked fifth in the American Association, his 2.97 ERA was topped only by Johnny Grodzicki's 2.58, and his 215 innings pitched ranked seventh. For 1942, he made 34 appearances (29 starts), ranking seventh with 237 innings pitched. His 2.96 ERA ranked ninth, but his record was only 14–16, those 16 losses tying with Owen Scheetz for second in the league, and behind Mickey Haefner's 17.

=== Farming, last two seasons (1943–1947) ===
Marcum did not pitch from 1943 through 1945, in the midst of World War II. Though he was not in the United States military, he supported the war effort by tending his farm in Kentucky. He returned to the Mud Hens in 1946 but was sent to the San Antonio Missions of the Class AA Texas League after just one appearance. With San Antonio, Marcum batted more often, making 18 appearances as a pinch hitter. In 12 games (two starts) as a pitcher, he had a 3–2 record, a 1.54 ERA, 15 strikeouts, four walks, and 38 hits allowed in 41 innings pitched. However, arm soreness was bothering him, and he departed the team on July 29. He pitched for the Borger Gassers of the Class C West Texas-New Mexico League in 1947, but after posting a 1–4 record and an 8.23 ERA, he retired in May.

== Career statistics ==
Over seven seasons in the major leagues, pitching exclusively in the AL, Marcum had a 65–63 career record. He posted a 4.66 ERA, striking out 392 hitters, walking 344, and allowing 1,269 to get hits in 1,099 1/3 innings pitched. Of his 195 games, 132 were starts, and he completed 69 of them, recording eight shutouts.

As a hitter in the major leagues, Marcum compiled a .265 average (141-for-533) with 56 runs scored, five home runs and 70 runs batted in (RBIs). He batted .311 (37-for-119) for the Athletics in 1935 and hit .329 (26-for-79) for the Browns and White Sox in 1939. He recorded 17 RBIs apiece in 1935 and 1939 and 13 RBIs in both 1934 and 1937. The St. Louis Globe-Democrat once called him "one of the hardest hitting pitchers in the league". Eddie Brietz of the Associated Press reported that his fellow players considered him the "laziest guy in the American League", due partly to his habit of picking up his teammate's bat at the plate rather than carrying one out from the dugout when it was time for him to hit.

== Pitching philosophy ==
While Marcum was with the Missions in 1946, he described to Ned Garver how he pitched against one of the Texas League's best hitters (unnamed by Garver in the account). "He's primarily a fastball hitter, so I deliberately throw him two fastballs out of the strike zone, to get behind in the count. Now he will look for the next pitch to be a fastball, but instead I throw him a changeup. That ball looks real nice and big to him, and he will swing at it, but he will usually just hit a weak fly or an easy grounder to short."

== Personal life ==
Marcum married Eminence resident Mary Elizabeth Wilson on December 30, 1936. Following his career, he returned to Eminence, where he operated his family's farm. The Marcums cultivated dairy and tobacco products on the property, which totaled 165 acres (67 ha). In 1976, Marcum experienced a stroke; though he survived, his memory was permanently affected. Hospitalized at the Jewish Memorial Hospital in Louisville in 1984, he died on September 10.
