= 1939 Major League Baseball season =

1939 MLB season
- League: American League (AL); National League (NL)
- Sport: Baseball
- Duration: Regular season: April 18 – October 1, 1939 (AL); April 17 – October 1, 1939 (NL); World Series: October 4–8, 1939
- Games: 154
- Teams: 16 (8 per league)

Regular season
- Season MVP: AL: Joe DiMaggio (NYY); NL: Bucky Walters (CIN)
- AL champions: New York Yankees
- AL runners-up: Boston Red Sox
- NL champions: Cincinnati Reds
- NL runners-up: St. Louis Cardinals

World Series
- Champions: New York Yankees
- Runners-up: Cincinnati Reds

MLB seasons
- ← 1938 1940 →

Locations of teams for the 1934–1939 American League seasons
American League
Locations of teams for the 1938–1940 National League seasons
National League

The 1939 major league baseball season began on April 17, 1939. The regular season ended on October 1, with the Cincinnati Reds and New York Yankees as the regular season champions of the National League and American League, respectively. The postseason began with Game 1 of the 36th World Series on October 4 and ended with Game 4 on October 8. The Yankees swept the Reds in four games, capturing their eighth championship in franchise history, and their last in a four-World Series run, becoming the first team to win four consecutive World Series.

The seventh All-Star Game was held on July 11 at Yankee Stadium in New York, New York, home of the New York Yankees. The American League won, 3–1.

== Schedule ==
The 1939 schedule consisted of 154 games for all teams in the American League and National League, each of which had eight teams. Each team was scheduled to play 22 games against the other seven teams of their respective league. This continued the format put in place since the 1904 season (except for 1919) and would be used until 1961 in the American League and 1962 in the National League.

National League Opening Day took place on April 17 with a game between the Pittsburgh Pirates and Cincinnati Reds, while American League Opening Day took place on the following day, with a game between the Chicago White Sox and Detroit Tigers. This continued the trend from the previous season which saw both leagues opened on different days. It was the first season since 1901 that saw both leagues open with just one game each. The final day of the regular season was on October 1 and featured twelve teams. The World Series took place between October 4 and October 8.

== Rule change ==
The 1939 season saw the following rule change:

- The scoring sacrifice fly, exempting a batter from a time at bat when a runner scored after the putout on a fly ball, was restored for the first time since its elimination in 1931. This would last only one season.
- Similar to the infield fly rule, now an umpire could make a judgment about an outfield fly ball. If it is judged that an outfielder intentionally drops a fly ball or line drive, the umpire shall immediately rule the ball has been caught. Like the infield fly rule, this only applies when there are less than two outs, and runners occupying at least first and second base.
- Pitchers can now start with only his pivot foot on or making contact in front of the pitching rubber.
- In the American League:
  - Night games were now approved, with up to seven night games allowed per team, though teams could not play at night on Saturdays, Sundays, holidays, nor could they start an inning after 11:50 p.m..
  - Baseballs would now match the National League's stitching.

== Teams ==
An asterisk (*) denotes the ballpark a team played the minority of their home games at

League	Team	City	Ballpark	Capacity	Manager
American League	Boston Red Sox	Boston, Massachusetts	Fenway Park	33,817	Joe Cronin
American League	Chicago White Sox	Chicago, Illinois	Comiskey Park	51,000	Jimmy Dykes
American League	Cleveland Indians	Cleveland, Ohio	League Park	22,500	Ossie Vitt
American League	Cleveland Indians	Cleveland, Ohio	Cleveland Stadium*	78,811*	Ossie Vitt
American League	Detroit Tigers	Detroit, Michigan	Briggs Stadium	58,000	Del Baker
American League	New York Yankees	New York, New York	Yankee Stadium	71,699	Joe McCarthy
American League	Philadelphia Athletics	Philadelphia, Pennsylvania	Shibe Park	33,000	Connie Mack
American League	Philadelphia Athletics	Philadelphia, Pennsylvania	Shibe Park	33,000	Earle Mack
American League	St. Louis Browns	St. Louis, Missouri	Sportsman's Park	34,023	Fred Haney
American League	Washington Senators	Washington, D.C.	Griffith Stadium	32,000	Bucky Harris
National League	Boston Bees	Boston, Massachusetts	National League Park	45,000	Casey Stengel
National League	Brooklyn Dodgers	New York, New York	Ebbets Field	35,000	Leo Durocher
National League	Chicago Cubs	Chicago, Illinois	Wrigley Field	38,000	Gabby Hartnett
National League	Cincinnati Reds	Cincinnati, Ohio	Crosley Field	29,401	Bill McKechnie
National League	New York Giants	New York, New York	Polo Grounds	51,856	Bill Terry
National League	Philadelphia Phillies	Philadelphia, Pennsylvania	Shibe Park	33,000	Doc Prothro
National League	Pittsburgh Pirates	Pittsburgh, Pennsylvania	Forbes Field	33,537	Pie Traynor
National League	St. Louis Cardinals	St. Louis, Missouri	Sportsman's Park	34,023	Ray Blades

== Standings ==
=== American League ===
American League
Team	W	L	Pct.	GB	Home	Road
New York Yankees	106	45	.702	—	52‍–‍25	54‍–‍20
Boston Red Sox	89	62	.589	17	42‍–‍32	47‍–‍30
Cleveland Indians	87	67	.565	20½	44‍–‍33	43‍–‍34
Chicago White Sox	85	69	.552	22½	50‍–‍27	35‍–‍42
Detroit Tigers	81	73	.526	26½	42‍–‍35	39‍–‍38
Washington Senators	65	87	.428	41½	37‍–‍39	28‍–‍48
Philadelphia Athletics	55	97	.362	51½	28‍–‍48	27‍–‍49
St. Louis Browns	43	111	.279	64½	18‍–‍59	25‍–‍52

=== National League ===
National League
Team	W	L	Pct.	GB	Home	Road
Cincinnati Reds	97	57	.630	—	55‍–‍25	42‍–‍32
St. Louis Cardinals	92	61	.601	4½	51‍–‍27	41‍–‍34
Brooklyn Dodgers	84	69	.549	12½	51‍–‍27	33‍–‍42
Chicago Cubs	84	70	.545	13	44‍–‍34	40‍–‍36
New York Giants	77	74	.510	18½	41‍–‍33	36‍–‍41
Pittsburgh Pirates	68	85	.444	28½	35‍–‍42	33‍–‍43
Boston Bees	63	88	.417	32½	37‍–‍35	26‍–‍53
Philadelphia Phillies	45	106	.298	50½	29‍–‍44	16‍–‍62

=== Tie games ===
10 tie games (4 in AL, 6 in NL), which are not factored into winning percentage or games behind (and were often replayed again) occurred throughout the season.

==== American League ====
- Boston Red Sox, 1
- Chicago White Sox, 1
- Detroit Tigers, 1
- New York Yankees, 1
- Philadelphia Athletics, 1
- St. Louis Browns, 2
- Washington Senators, 1

==== National League ====
- Boston Bees, 1
- Brooklyn Dodgers, 4
- Chicago Cubs, 2
- Cincinnati Reds, 2
- Philadelphia Phillies, 1
- St. Louis Cardinals, 2

== Postseason ==
The postseason began on October 4 and ended on October 8 with the New York Yankees sweeping the Cincinnati Reds in the 1939 World Series in four games.

=== Bracket ===
World Series
AL	New York Yankees	4
NL	Cincinnati Reds	0

== Managerial changes ==
=== Off-season ===
Team	Former Manager	New Manager
St. Louis Browns	Oscar Melillo	Fred Haney
Brooklyn Dodgers	Burleigh Grimes	Leo Durocher
Philadelphia Phillies	Hans Lobert	Doc Prothro
St. Louis Cardinals	Mike González	Ray Blades

=== In-season ===
Team	Former Manager	New Manager
Philadelphia Athletics	Connie Mack	Earle Mack

== League leaders ==
=== American League ===
Hitting leaders
Stat	Player	Total
AVG	Joe DiMaggio (NYY)	.381
OPS	Jimmie Foxx (BOS)	1.158
HR	Jimmie Foxx (BOS)	35
RBI	Ted Williams (BOS)	145
R	Red Rolfe (NYY)	139
H	Red Rolfe (NYY)	213
SB	George Case (WSH)	51

Pitching leaders
Stat	Player	Total
W	Bob Feller (CLE)	24
L	Vern Kennedy (SLB/DET)	20
ERA	Lefty Grove (BOS)	2.54
K	Bob Feller (CLE)	246
IP	Bob Feller (CLE)	296.2
SV	Johnny Murphy (NYY)	19
WHIP	Ted Lyons (CWS)	1.089

=== National League ===
Hitting leaders
Stat	Player	Total
AVG	Johnny Mize (STL)	.349
OPS	Johnny Mize (STL)	1.070
HR	Johnny Mize (STL)	28
RBI	Frank McCormick (CIN)	128
R	Billy Werber (CIN)	115
H	Frank McCormick (CIN)	209
SB	Stan Hack (CHC); Lee Handley (PIT)	17

Pitching leaders
Stat	Player	Total
W	Bucky Walters^{1} (CIN)	27
L	Max Butcher (PIT/PHI); Bob Klinger (PIT)	17
ERA	Bucky Walters^{1} (CIN)	2.29
K	Claude Passeau (CHC/PHI); Bucky Walters^{1} (CIN)	137
IP	Bucky Walters (CIN)	319.0
SV	Clyde Shoun (STL)	9
WHIP	Bucky Walters (CIN)	1.125

^{1} National League Triple Crown pitching winner

== Milestones ==
=== Batters ===
==== Cycles ====
- Sam Chapman (PHA):
  - Chapman hit for his first cycle and ninth in franchise history, on May 5 against the St. Louis Browns.
- Charlie Gehringer (DET):
  - Gehringer hit for his first cycle, the fourth in franchise history, and fifth natural cycle in major league history on May 27 against the St. Louis Browns.
- Arky Vaughan (PIT):
  - Vaughan hit for his second cycle, the 11th in franchise history, and the fifth reverse cycle in major league history on July 19 against the New York Giants.

==== Other batting accomplishments ====
- Harry Danning / Frank Demaree / Burgess Whitehead / Manny Salvo / Jo-Jo Moore (NYG):
  - Become the first group of players in Major League history to hit five home runs in one inning in the fourth inning against the Cincinnati Reds on June 6.
- Jim Tabor (BOS):
  - Became the second player to hit two grand slams in a single game, in an 18–12 win over the Philadelphia Athletics in game two of a doubleheader on July 4.

=== Miscellaneous ===
- Lou Gehrig (NYY):
  - Set a Major League record for most consecutive games at 2,130 on April 30. It would be the final game of his career.

== Awards and honors ==
=== Regular season ===
Baseball Writers' Association of America Awards
BBWAA Award	National League	American League
Most Valuable Player	Bucky Walters (CIN)	Joe DiMaggio (NYY)

=== Other awards ===
The Sporting News Awards
Award	National League	American League
Most Valuable Player	Bucky Walters (CIN)	Joe DiMaggio (NYY)
Player of the Year	—	Joe DiMaggio (NYY)
Manager of the Year	Leo Durocher (BRO)	—
Executive of the Year	Larry MacPhail (BRO)	—

=== Baseball Hall of Fame ===
- George Sisler
- Lou Gehrig
- Eddie Collins
- Willie Keeler
- Cap Anson
- Buck Ewing
- Charles Radbourn
- Charles Comiskey (executive/pioneer contributor)
- Candy Cummings (executive/pioneer contributor)
- Albert Spalding (executive/pioneer contributor)

== Home field attendance ==
Team name	Wins	%±	Home attendance	%±	Per game
Cincinnati Reds	97	18.3%	981,443	38.9%	12,117
Brooklyn Dodgers	84	21.7%	955,668	44.1%	12,252
New York Yankees	106	7.1%	859,785	−11.4%	11,166
Detroit Tigers	81	−3.6%	836,279	4.6%	10,722
Chicago Cubs	84	−5.6%	726,663	−23.6%	9,083
New York Giants	77	−7.2%	702,457	−12.2%	9,493
Chicago White Sox	85	30.8%	594,104	75.6%	7,716
Boston Red Sox	89	1.1%	573,070	−11.4%	7,641
Cleveland Indians	87	1.2%	563,926	−13.5%	7,324
St. Louis Cardinals	92	29.6%	400,245	37.3%	5,066
Philadelphia Athletics	55	3.8%	395,022	2.5%	5,198
Pittsburgh Pirates	68	−20.9%	376,734	−41.2%	4,893
Washington Senators	65	−13.3%	339,257	−35.1%	4,406
Boston Bees	63	−18.2%	285,994	−16.2%	3,918
Philadelphia Phillies	45	0.0%	277,973	67.3%	3,756
St. Louis Browns	43	−21.8%	109,159	−16.3%	1,399

== Venues ==
Over 77 home games, the Cleveland Indians played 47 games at League Park and 30 games at Cleveland Stadium. This would be the 5th of 12 seasons since 1932 that saw the Indians play at both venues.

== Media ==
=== Television ===
The first Major League game is televised on August 26, when WXBS-TV broadcasts the game between the Cincinnati Reds and the Brooklyn Dodgers at Ebbets Field. The two teams played a doubleheader that day, and the second game was also televised.

== Retired numbers ==
- Lou Gehrig had his No. 4 retired by the New York Yankees on July 4. This was the first number retired by the team and first retired number in MLB history.

== See also ==
- 1939 in baseball (Events, Births, Deaths)
