= 1939 Cincinnati Reds season =

1939 Cincinnati Reds
- National League champion
- League: National League
- Ballpark: Crosley Field
- City: Cincinnati
- Owners: Powel Crosley Jr.
- General managers: Warren Giles
- Managers: Bill McKechnie
- Radio: WCPO (Harry Hartman); WSAI (Roger Baker, Dick Bray)

The 1939 Cincinnati Reds season was a season in American baseball. The team finished first in the National League, winning the pennant by 4 1/2 games over the St. Louis Cardinals with a record of 97–57. The team went on to the 1939 World Series, which they lost in four straight games to the New York Yankees.

== Regular season ==
During the season, Paul Derringer and Bucky Walters became the last pitchers to win at least 25 games in one season for the Reds in the 20th century.

=== Season standings ===
National League
| Team | W | L | Pct. | GB | Home | Road |
|---|---|---|---|---|---|---|
| Cincinnati Reds | 97 | 57 | .630 | — | 55‍–‍25 | 42‍–‍32 |
| St. Louis Cardinals | 92 | 61 | .601 | 4½ | 51‍–‍27 | 41‍–‍34 |
| Brooklyn Dodgers | 84 | 69 | .549 | 12½ | 51‍–‍27 | 33‍–‍42 |
| Chicago Cubs | 84 | 70 | .545 | 13 | 44‍–‍34 | 40‍–‍36 |
| New York Giants | 77 | 74 | .510 | 18½ | 41‍–‍33 | 36‍–‍41 |
| Pittsburgh Pirates | 68 | 85 | .444 | 28½ | 35‍–‍42 | 33‍–‍43 |
| Boston Bees | 63 | 88 | .417 | 32½ | 37‍–‍35 | 26‍–‍53 |
| Philadelphia Phillies | 45 | 106 | .298 | 50½ | 29‍–‍44 | 16‍–‍62 |

=== Record vs. opponents ===
1939 National League record Sources:
| Team | BSN | BRO | CHC | CIN | NYG | PHI | PIT | STL |
|---|---|---|---|---|---|---|---|---|
| Boston | — | 10–12–1 | 6–16 | 6–16 | 10–11 | 13–8 | 9–12 | 9–13 |
| Brooklyn | 12–10–1 | — | 11–11–2 | 10–12 | 12–10 | 17–4–1 | 13–9 | 9–13 |
| Chicago | 16–6 | 11–11–2 | — | 10–12 | 11–11 | 12–10 | 14–8 | 10–12 |
| Cincinnati | 16–6 | 12–10 | 12–10 | — | 11–11 | 19–3 | 16–6 | 11–11–2 |
| New York | 11–10 | 10–12 | 11–11 | 11–11 | — | 14–7 | 11–11 | 9–12 |
| Philadelphia | 8–13 | 4–17–1 | 10–12 | 3–19 | 7–14 | — | 8–14 | 5–17 |
| Pittsburgh | 12–9 | 9–13 | 8–14 | 6–16 | 11–11 | 14–8 | — | 8–14 |
| St. Louis | 13–9 | 13–9 | 12–10 | 11–11–2 | 12–9 | 17–5 | 14–8 | — |

=== Notable transactions ===
- August 19, 1939: Milt Shoffner was selected off waivers by the Reds from the Boston Bees.
- August 31, 1939: Al Simmons was purchased by the Reds from the Boston Bees.

=== Roster ===
1939 Cincinnati Reds
Roster
| Pitchers: 37 Red Barrett; 37 Peaches Davis; 30 Paul Derringer; 42 Lee Grissom; 14 Art Jacobs; 14 Hank Johnson; 36 Wes Livengood; 35 Whitey Moore; 38 Pete Naktenis; 36 Johnny Niggeling; 14 Elmer Riddle; 37 Milt Shoffner; 39 Junior Thompson; 33 Johnny Vander Meer; 31 Bucky Walters; 34 Jim Weaver | Catchers: 5 Willard Hershberger; 4 Ernie Lombardi; 3 Jimmie Wilson; Infielders: 11 Lonny Frey; 19 Milt Galatzer; 17 Eddie Joost; 10 Frank McCormick; 12 Billy Myers; 45 Nolen Richardson; 15 Lew Riggs; 18 Billy Werber | Outfielders: 22 Wally Berger; 27 Nino Bongiovanni; 26 Frenchy Bordagaray; 23 Harry Craft; 28 Vince DiMaggio; 25 Lee Gamble; 24 Ival Goodman; 36 Bud Hafey; 38 Al Simmons; 34,38 Dick West; Other batters: 16 Les Scarsella | Manager: 1 Bill McKechnie; Coaches: 2 Hank Gowdy; 3 Jimmie Wilson |

== Player stats ==
| = Indicates team leader |

| = Indicates league leader |

=== Batting ===
==== Starters by position ====
Note: Pos = Position; G = Games played; AB = At bats; R = Runs ; H = Hits; Avg. = Batting average; HR = Home runs; RBI = Runs batted in

| Pos | Player | G | AB | R | H | Avg. | HR | RBI |
|---|---|---|---|---|---|---|---|---|
| C | Ernie Lombardi | 130 | 450 | 43 | 129 | .287 | 20 | 85 |
| 1B | Frank McCormick | 156 | 630 | 99 | 209 | .332 | 18 | 128 |
| 2B | Lonny Frey | 125 | 484 | 95 | 141 | .291 | 11 | 55 |
| SS | Billy Myers | 151 | 509 | 79 | 143 | .281 | 9 | 56 |
| 3B | Billy Werber | 147 | 599 | 115 | 173 | .289 | 5 | 57 |
| OF | Ival Goodman | 124 | 470 | 85 | 152 | .323 | 7 | 84 |
| OF | Harry Craft | 134 | 502 | 58 | 129 | .257 | 13 | 67 |
| OF | Wally Berger | 97 | 329 | 36 | 85 | .258 | 14 | 44 |

==== Other batters ====
Note: G = Games played; AB = At bats; H = Hits; Avg. = Batting average; HR = Home runs; RBI = Runs batted in

| Player | G | AB | H | Avg. | HR | RBI |
|---|---|---|---|---|---|---|
| Lee Gamble | 72 | 221 | 59 | .267 | 0 | 14 |
| Willard Hershberger | 63 | 174 | 60 | .345 | 0 | 32 |
| Nino Bongiovanni | 27 | 159 | 41 | .258 | 0 | 16 |
| Eddie Joost | 23 | 143 | 36 | .252 | 0 | 14 |
| Frenchy Bordagaray | 63 | 122 | 24 | .197 | 0 | 12 |
| Lew Riggs | 22 | 38 | 6 | .158 | 0 | 1 |
| Al Simmons | 9 | 21 | 3 | .143 | 0 | 1 |
| Dick West | 8 | 19 | 4 | .211 | 0 | 4 |
| Vince DiMaggio | 8 | 14 | 1 | .071 | 0 | 2 |
| Les Scarsella | 16 | 14 | 2 | .143 | 0 | 0 |
| Bud Hafey | 6 | 13 | 2 | .154 | 0 | 1 |
| Milt Galatzer | 3 | 5 | 0 | .000 | 0 | 0 |
| Jimmie Wilson | 4 | 3 | 1 | .333 | 0 | 0 |
| Nolen Richardson | 1 | 3 | 0 | .000 | 0 | 0 |

=== Pitching ===
==== Starting pitchers ====
Note: G = Games pitched; IP = Innings pitched; W = Wins; L = Losses; ERA = Earned run average; SO = Strikeouts

| Player | G | IP | W | L | ERA | SO |
|---|---|---|---|---|---|---|
| Bucky Walters | 39 | 319.0 | 27 | 11 | 2.29 | 137 |
| Paul Derringer | 38 | 301.0 | 25 | 7 | 2.93 | 128 |
| Whitey Moore | 42 | 187.2 | 13 | 12 | 3.45 | 81 |

Note: Whitey Moore led the Reds in saves with 3.

==== Other pitchers ====
Note: G = Games pitched; IP = Innings pitched; W = Wins; L = Losses; ERA = Earned run average; SO = Strikeouts

| Player | G | IP | W | L | ERA | SO |
|---|---|---|---|---|---|---|
| Lee Grissom | 33 | 153.2 | 9 | 7 | 4.10 | 53 |
| Junior Thompson | 42 | 152.1 | 13 | 5 | 2.54 | 87 |
| Johnny Vander Meer | 30 | 129.0 | 5 | 9 | 4.67 | 102 |
| Johnny Niggeling | 10 | 40.1 | 2 | 1 | 5.80 | 20 |
| Milt Shoffner | 10 | 37.2 | 2 | 2 | 3.35 | 6 |

==== Relief pitchers ====
Note: G = Games pitched; W = Wins; L = Losses; SV = Saves; ERA = Earned run average; SO = Strikeouts

| Player | G | W | L | SV | ERA | SO |
|---|---|---|---|---|---|---|
| Peaches Davis | 20 | 1 | 0 | 2 | 6.26 | 4 |
| Hank Johnson | 20 | 0 | 3 | 1 | 2.01 | 10 |
| Wes Livengood | 5 | 0 | 0 | 0 | 5.93 | 4 |
| Jim Weaver | 3 | 0 | 0 | 0 | 3.00 | 3 |
| Pete Naktenis | 3 | 0 | 0 | 0 | 2.25 | 1 |
| Red Barrett | 2 | 0 | 0 | 0 | 1.69 | 1 |
| Elmer Riddle | 1 | 0 | 0 | 0 | 0.00 | 0 |
| Art Jacobs | 1 | 0 | 0 | 1 | 9.00 | 1 |

== 1939 World Series ==
=== Game 1 ===
October 4, 1939, at Yankee Stadium in New York City

| Team | 1 | 2 | 3 | 4 | 5 | 6 | 7 | 8 | 9 | R | H | E |
|---|---|---|---|---|---|---|---|---|---|---|---|---|
| Cincinnati (N) | 0 | 0 | 0 | 1 | 0 | 0 | 0 | 0 | 0 | 1 | 4 | 0 |
| New York (A) | 0 | 0 | 0 | 0 | 1 | 0 | 0 | 0 | 1 | 2 | 6 | 0 |
W: Red Ruffing (1–0) L: Paul Derringer (0–1)

In the opening game of the 1939 World Series, starters Paul Derringer of the Reds and Red Ruffing of the Yankees each pitched complete games. Cincinnati struck first in the top of the 4th inning, as with two outs, Ival Goodman walked, then stole second base, putting him in scoring position. Frank McCormick then hit a single to left field, scoring Goodman and giving the Reds an early 1–0 lead.

In the bottom of the 5th inning, the Yankees Joe Gordon hit a one out single. The next Yankees hitter, Babe Dahlgren, followed with a double to left field, scoring Gordon and tying the game 1–1.

The game would remain tied until the bottom of the 9th inning, as Yankees right fielder Charlie Keller hit a triple to right field with one out, putting the winning run on third base. Derringer then intentionally walked Joe DiMaggio, putting runners on first and third, setting up a possible double play with Yankees catcher Bill Dickey batting next. Dickey hit a single to centerfield, scoring Keller, giving the Yankees a 2–1 victory and taking an early 1–0 series lead.

Paul Derringer pitched the complete game, allowing six hits and two runs, while striking out seven Yankees hitters.

=== Game 2 ===
October 5, 1939, at Yankee Stadium in New York City

| Team | 1 | 2 | 3 | 4 | 5 | 6 | 7 | 8 | 9 | R | H | E |
|---|---|---|---|---|---|---|---|---|---|---|---|---|
| Cincinnati (N) | 0 | 0 | 0 | 0 | 0 | 0 | 0 | 0 | 0 | 0 | 2 | 0 |
| New York (A) | 0 | 0 | 3 | 1 | 0 | 0 | 0 | 0 | x | 4 | 9 | 0 |
W: Monte Pearson (1–0) L: Bucky Walters (0–1)
HR: : NYY – Babe Dahlgren (1)

The second game of the series took only 87 minutes to play, as both the Reds Bucky Walters and the Yankees Monte Pearson would pitch complete games. The game remained scoreless until the bottom of the 3rd inning, as Yankees first baseman Babe Dahlgren led off the inning with a ground-rule double to left field. Yankees pitcher Monte Pearson had a sacrifice bunt, moving Dahlgren to third base with one out. The next New York hitter, leadoff man Frankie Crosetti, grounded out to Reds shortstop Billy Myers, as Dahlgren scored from third base, giving the Yankees a 1–0 lead. With two outs, the Yankees Red Rolfe then singled off of Walters to right field. Charlie Keller then came to bat and hit a double left field, scoring Rolfe and giving New York a 2–0 lead. Joe DiMaggio then kept the inning alive for the Yankees, as he hit a weak ground ball to third base, fielded by the Reds pitcher Walters, as DiMaggio reached first base, while Keller moved to third. Yankees catcher Bill Dickey then stepped up and hit a line drive single to right field, as the Yankees took a 3–0 lead after three innings.

In the bottom of the 4th inning, Babe Dahlgren of the Yankees hit the first home run of the World Series, a solo shot to left field, as New York took a commanding 4–0 lead.

The Reds would only muster up two hits in the game, as Monte Pearson shut down Cincinnati, striking out eight batters, in the Yankees 4–0 win as New York took a 2–0 series lead.

=== Game 3 ===
October 7, 1939, at Crosley Field in Cincinnati

| Team | 1 | 2 | 3 | 4 | 5 | 6 | 7 | 8 | 9 | R | H | E |
|---|---|---|---|---|---|---|---|---|---|---|---|---|
| New York (A) | 2 | 0 | 2 | 0 | 3 | 0 | 0 | 0 | 0 | 7 | 5 | 1 |
| Cincinnati (N) | 1 | 2 | 0 | 0 | 0 | 0 | 0 | 0 | 0 | 3 | 10 | 0 |
W: Bump Hadley (1–0) L: Junior Thompson (0–1)
HR: NYY – Charlie Keller (1, 2), Joe DiMaggio (1), Bill Dickey (1)

The series shifted to Crosley Field for game three, as it was the first time since the 1919 World Series that the city of Cincinnati hosted a World Series game. Junior Thompson got the start for the Reds against Lefty Gomez for the Yankees. New York got off to a quick start in the 1st inning, as leadoff batter Frankie Crosetti earned a walk, then moved to second base on a groundout by Red Rolfe. Charlie Keller came up to bat next for New York, and he hit a two-run home run to deep right field, giving the Yankees a 2–0 lead.

In the bottom of the 1st inning, with two outs, the Reds Ival Goodman and Frank McCormick hit back-to-back singles, putting runners on first and third base. Ernie Lombardi then singled to center field, scoring Goodman, as the Reds cut the Yankees lead to 2–1.

In the bottom of the 2nd inning, the Yankees replaced Gomez with Bump Hadley, and the Reds took advantage of the pitching change. With one out, Billy Myers and Junior Thompson hit back-to-back singles, putting runners on first and third. Reds leadoff man Billy Werber then hit a single to center field, scoring Myers, moved Thompson to third base, and tying the game 2–2. Lonny Frey then hit a grounder to Yankees first baseman Babe Dahlgren as Thompson broke for home, however, Dahlgren threw out Thompson at the plate, keeping the game tied. The next Reds batter, Ival Goodman, then singled to right field, scoring Werber and giving Cincinnati a 3–2 lead in the game.

In the top of the 3rd inning, the Yankees responded, as Charlie Keller earned a two-out walk. The next hitter, Joe DiMaggio, made the Reds pay for the walk, as he blasted a two-run home run to deep center field, restoring the lead for New York at 4–3.

The Yankees took control of the game in the top of the 5th inning, as with one out, Red Rolfe hit a single to right field. The next batter, Charlie Keller, then hit a two-run home run, extending the lead to 6–3 for New York. After getting Joe DiMaggio to pop out to third base for the second out, the Yankees Bill Dickey hit the second home run of the inning for New York, extending their lead to 7–3. As a result, the Reds replaced pitcher Junior Thompson with Lee Grissom.

Grissom pitched well over the next 1.1 innings, allowing no hits and walking one batter. Whitey Moore then pitched the final three innings for Cincinnati, allowing no hits or walks, however, the damage was done, as New York won the game 7–3 and took a 3–0 series lead.

=== Game 4 ===
October 8, 1939, at Crosley Field in Cincinnati

| Team | 1 | 2 | 3 | 4 | 5 | 6 | 7 | 8 | 9 | 10 | R | H | E |
|---|---|---|---|---|---|---|---|---|---|---|---|---|---|
| New York (A) | 0 | 0 | 0 | 0 | 0 | 0 | 2 | 0 | 2 | 3 | 7 | 7 | 1 |
| Cincinnati (N) | 0 | 0 | 0 | 0 | 0 | 0 | 3 | 1 | 0 | 0 | 4 | 11 | 4 |
W: Johnny Murphy (1–0) L: Bucky Walters (0–2)
HR: NYY – Charlie Keller (3), Bill Dickey (2)

Down 3–0 in the series, the Reds started staff ace Paul Derringer in the fourth game, hoping to extend the series. Derringer pitched a complete game in the first game of the series in a 2–1 loss. The Yankees started Oral Hildebrand for the fourth game. Hildebrand pitched four innings of shutout ball, allowing only two hits and striking out three before handing the ball off to Steve Sundra in the fifth inning in a 0–0 game.

The Yankees finally broke the scoreless tie in the top of the 7th inning, as Charlie Keller led the inning off with his third home run of the World Series, giving New York a 1–0 lead. After getting Joe DiMaggio to fly out to left field, the Yankees Bill Dickey hit his second home run of the series, extending the lead to 2–0.

In the bottom of the 7th inning, the Reds Frank McCormick led the inning off with a grounder to third base, however, Red Rolfe made a fielding error, putting McCormick on first base. After Ernie Lombardi struck out, Al Simmons hit a double to deep left-center field, moving McCormick to third base. Next, Wally Berger hit a grounder to Yankees shortstop Frankie Crosetti, who threw Berger out at first base, as McCormick came into score, cutting New York's lead to 2–1. With two outs, Billy Myers walked, putting runners at first and second base with Paul Derringer due up. The Reds decided to pinch hit for Derringer, as Willard Hershberger went up to bat in his place. Hershberger then hit a short fly ball to center field, which dropped for a single, allowing Simmons to score and tying the game 2–2 while Myers moved to third. The next Reds batter, Billy Werber, hit a line drive single to right field, giving Cincinnati their first lead of the game, as the Reds took a 3–2 lead.

In the bottom of the 8th, Ival Goodman hit a leadoff double off of Yankees pitcher Johnny Murphy. Up next, Frank McCormick had a sacrifice bunt groundout to first base, moving Goodman over to third base with one out. Ernie Lombardi then hits a single to center field, scoring Goodman, as the Reds take a 4–2 lead into the ninth inning.

With Bucky Walters now pitching for Cincinnati, as he entered the game in the 8th inning after Paul Derringer was pinch hit for in the 7th, the Yankees Charlie Keller leads off the inning with a single to right field. The following batter, Joe DiMaggio, hits a single left field, as Keller reaches third base on the play. Yankees catcher Bill Dickey steps up to the plate next, as he hits a grounder to Reds second baseman Lonny Frey. Frey threw it to shortstop Billy Myers, who dropped the throw, allowing DiMaggio to be safe on the play, and Keller to score, as the Yankees cut the Reds lead to 4–3 with runners on first and second base. The Yankees George Selkirk hits a line drive to right field for the first out of the inning, however, DiMaggio tags up and runs to third base. Joe Gordon then hits a ground ball single to third base, scoring DiMaggio, as New York tied the game 4–4. The Reds are able to get out of the inning, as Babe Dahlgren pops out to first base, and Johnny Murphy struck out looking.

As the Reds were unable to score in the bottom of the 9th inning, the game went into extra innings. In the top of the 10th, the Yankees Frankie Crosetti leads off the inning with a walk. Red Rolfe then hits a sacrifice bunt first base, moving Crosetti to second base. Up next, Charlie Keller hit a ground ball to shortstop Billy Myers, however, Goodman committed an error, allowing Crosetti to move to third base, and Keller safe at first. The Yankees next hitter, Joe DiMaggio, hit a single to right field, allowing Crosetti to score to make the score 5–4. On the play, Reds right fielder Ival Goodman wasn't able to field to ball properly, allowing Keller to score on the play, making it 6–4. With DiMaggio running home, Reds catcher Ernie Lombardi wasn't able to tag him out, as the Yankees took a commanding 7–4 lead.

In the bottom of the 10th inning, looking for three runs to tie the game, the Reds Ival Goodman and Frank McCormick hit back-to-back singles, putting the tying run up to the plate. Ernie Lombardi was the first out of the inning, as he popped out to Yankees catcher Bill Dickey. Al Simmons then lined out to right field, followed by a Wally Berger line out to Yankees shortstop Frankie Crosetti, as the Yankees won the game 7–4 and swept the series in four games with their fourth consecutive World Series championship.

== Farm system ==
| Level | Team | League | Manager |
|---|---|---|---|
| AA | Indianapolis Indians | American Association | Ray Schalk and Wes Griffin |
| A1 | Birmingham Barons | Southern Association | Dutch Zwilling |
| A | Albany Senators | Eastern League | Rabbit Maranville |
| B | Durham Bulls | Piedmont League | Oscar Roettger |
| B | Columbia Reds | Sally League | Johnny Burnett |
| B | Waterloo Red Hawks | Illinois–Indiana–Iowa League | Cap Crossley |
| C | El Dorado Lions | Cotton States League | Frank O'Rourke |
| C | Helena Seaporters | Cotton States League | Buster Blakeney |
| C | Erie Sailors | Middle Atlantic League | Jocko Munch |
| C | Ogden Reds | Pioneer League | Bill McCorry |
| C | Muskogee Reds | Western Association | Lester "Pat" Patterson |
| D | Bassett Furniture Makers | Bi-State League | Walter Novak |
