= W711-2 =

Former set of baseball cards

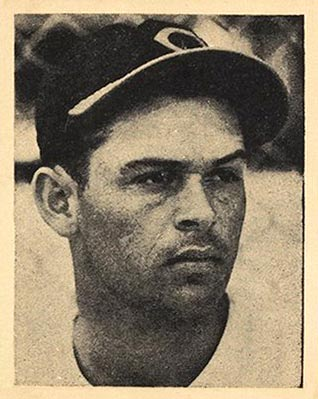
- Mike McCormick, one of the players portrayed
- Type: Baseball card
- Country: United States
- Availability: 1940–1940
- Features: Cincinnati Reds players

W711-2 was a baseball card set of 35 total unnumbered, black and white cards measuring 2 1/8" × 2 5/8" released in 1940. The complete set was issued by the Cincinnati Reds baseball club, and sold at the ballpark. 29 cards feature a player's portrait photo on the front while name, position and biographical information and five years worth of statistics are on the back.

== Overview ==
This set was part of the 711 series, consisting of several collection issued by the Reds from 1939 to 1956. The 711-2 collection is also commonly known as the '1940 Cincinnati Reds Team Issue' instead of Jefferson Burdick's The American Card Catalog reference number. The balance of the 6 cards were reference cards describing the World Series win in 1940 against the Detroit Tigers and an order form in which to get more of these sets from Harry Hartman Publishing Co. in Cincinnati, Ohio.

This set had few known baseball stars on the team with the exception of Johnny Vandermeer who still holds the record for two consecutive no-hitter games in 1938, Eddie Joost and Ernie Lombardi. A complete list of players in this set are shown below.

== Player/card list ==
- Morrie Arnovich
- William (Bill) Baker
- Joe Beggs
- Harry Craft
- Paul Derringer
- Lonny Frey
- Ival Goodman
- Harry (Hank) Gowdy
- Witt Guise
- Harry (Socko) Hartman
- Willard Hershberger
- John Hutchings
- Eddie Joost
- Ernie Lombardi
- Frank McCormick
- Myron McCormick
- William Boyd McKechnie
- Lloyd (Whitey) Moore
- William (Bill) Meyers
- Lewis Riggs
- Elmer Riddle
- James A. Ripple
- Milt Shoffner
- Eugene Thompson
- James Turner
- Johnny Vandermeer
- Bucky Walters
- William Werber
- James Wilson
- The Cincinnati Reds
- The Cincinnati Reds World Champions
- Tell the World About the Cincinnati Reds
- Tell the World About the Cincinnati Reds World Champions
- Results 1940 World Series
- Debt of Gratitude to Wm. Koeh Co.
