= 1941 Major League Baseball All-Star Game =

1941 American baseball competition

	1	2	3	4	5	6	7	8	9	R	H	E
National League	0	0	0	0	0	1	2	2	0	5	10	2
American League	0	0	0	1	0	1	0	1	4	7	11	3
- Date: July 8, 1941
- Venue: Briggs Stadium
- City: Detroit, Michigan
- Managers: Bill McKechnie (CIN); Del Baker (DET)
- Attendance: 54,674
- Ceremonial first pitch: None
- Radio: CBS; Mutual; WWJ (DET); WXYZ (DET)
- Radio announcers: Mel Allen and France Laux (CBS); Red Barber and Bob Elson (Mutual); Ty Tyson (WWJ); Harry Heilmann (WXYZ)

The 1941 Major League Baseball All-Star Game was the ninth playing of the mid-summer classic between the all-stars of the American League (AL) and National League (NL), the two leagues comprising Major League Baseball. The game was held on July 8, 1941, at Briggs Stadium in Detroit, Michigan, the home of the Detroit Tigers of the American League.

== Result and key moments ==
The American League defeated the National League, 7–5. With the NL leading 5–4, two outs in the bottom of the ninth inning, and Joe Gordon and Joe DiMaggio of the New York Yankees on base; Ted Williams of the Boston Red Sox hit a walk-off home run off of Claude Passeau of the Chicago Cubs to win it for the AL.

Prior to Williams' at-bat DiMaggio hit a potential game-ending double play groundball. However, Billy Herman’s relay throw pulled first baseman Frank McCormick off the bag, thus extending the game and setting up Williams' at-bat.

In the end, the AL's dramatic 7–5 walk-off win overshadowed two home runs hit by Pittsburgh Pirates shortstop Arky Vaughan, which had given the NL 3–2 and 5–2 leads in the seventh and eighth innings, respectively.

== Rosters ==
Players in italics have since been inducted into the National Baseball Hall of Fame.

=== National League ===
Starters
Position	Player	Team	All-Star Games
P	Whit Wyatt	Dodgers	3
C	Mickey Owen	Dodgers	1
1B	Johnny Mize	Cardinals	4
2B	Lonny Frey	Reds	2
3B	Stan Hack	Cubs	3
SS	Arky Vaughan	Pirates	8
LF	Terry Moore	Cardinals	3
CF	Pete Reiser	Dodgers	1
RF	Bill Nicholson	Cubs	2

Pitchers
Position	Player	Team	All-Star Games
P	Cy Blanton	Phillies	2
P	Paul Derringer	Reds	5
P	Carl Hubbell	Giants	8
P	Claude Passeau	Cubs	1
P	Bucky Walters	Reds	4
P	Lon Warneke	Cardinals	5

Reserves
Position	Player	Team	All-Star Games
C	Harry Danning	Giants	4
C	Al López	Pirates	2
1B	Dolph Camilli	Dodgers	2
1B	Frank McCormick	Reds	4
2B	Billy Herman	Dodgers	8
SS	Eddie Miller	Braves	2
3B	Cookie Lavagetto	Dodgers	4
OF	Bob Elliott	Pirates	1
OF	Hank Leiber	Cubs	3
OF	Joe Medwick	Dodgers	8
OF	Mel Ott	Giants	8
OF	Enos Slaughter	Cardinals	1

=== American League ===
Starters
Position	Player	Team	All-Star Games
P	Bob Feller	Indians	4
C	Bill Dickey	Yankees	8
1B	Rudy York	Tigers	2
2B	Bobby Doerr	Red Sox	1
3B	Cecil Travis	Senators	3
SS	Joe Cronin	Red Sox	7
LF	Ted Williams	Red Sox	2
CF	Joe DiMaggio	Yankees	6
RF	Jeff Heath	Indians	1

Pitchers
Position	Player	Team	All-Star Games
P	Al Benton	Tigers	1
P	Sid Hudson	Senators	1
P	Thornton Lee	White Sox	1
P	Red Ruffing	Yankees	5
P	Marius Russo	Yankees	1
P	Eddie Smith	White Sox	1

Reserves
Position	Player	Team	All-Star Games
C	Frankie Hayes	Athletics	3
C	Birdie Tebbetts	Tigers	1
1B	Jimmie Foxx	Red Sox	9
2B	Joe Gordon	Yankees	3
3B	Ken Keltner	Indians	2
SS	Luke Appling	White Sox	4
SS	Lou Boudreau	Indians	2
OF	Roy Cullenbine	Browns	1
OF	Dom DiMaggio	Red Sox	1
OF	Charlie Keller	Yankees	2

== Game ==
=== Umpires ===
Position	Umpire	League
Home Plate	Bill Summers	American
First Base	Lou Jorda	National
Second Base	Bill Grieve	American
Third Base	Babe Pinelli	National

The umpires changed assignments in the middle of the fifth inning – Summers and Pinelli swapped positions, also Jorda and Grieve swapped positions.

=== Starting lineups ===
National League				American League			
Order	Player	Team	Position	Order	Player	Team	Position
1	Stan Hack	Cubs	3B	1	Bobby Doerr	Red Sox	2B
2	Terry Moore	Cardinals	LF	2	Cecil Travis	Senators	3B
3	Pete Reiser	Dodgers	CF	3	Joe DiMaggio	Yankees	CF
4	Johnny Mize	Cardinals	1B	4	Ted Williams	Red Sox	LF
5	Bill Nicholson	Cubs	RF	5	Jeff Heath	Indians	RF
6	Arky Vaughan	Pirates	SS	6	Joe Cronin	Red Sox	SS
7	Lonny Frey	Reds	2B	7	Rudy York	Tigers	1B
8	Mickey Owen	Dodgers	C	8	Bill Dickey	Yankees	C
9	Whit Wyatt	Dodgers	P	9	Bob Feller	Indians	P

=== Game summary ===
Tuesday, July 8, 1941 1:30 pm (ET) at Briggs Stadium in Detroit, Michigan
Team	1	2	3	4	5	6	7	8	9	R	H	E
National League	0	0	0	0	0	1	2	2	0	5	10	2
American League	0	0	0	1	0	1	0	1	4	7	11	3
WP: Eddie Smith (1–0) LP: Claude Passeau (0–1); Home runs: NL: Arky Vaughan (2); AL: Ted Williams (1)

Bob Feller (Cleveland, AL) and Whit Wyatt (Brooklyn, NL) pitched three and two scoreless innings, respectively, to start the game. Neither team put a runner in scoring position until the fourth inning, when doubles by Cecil Travis (Washington) and Ted Williams off Paul Derringer (Cincinnati) put the AL ahead 1–0.

Bucky Waters (Cincinnati) led off the sixth inning with a double. A bunt by Stan Hack (Chicago Cubs) moved Waters to third and a sacrifice fly by Terry Moore (St. Louis Cardinals) tied the game at 1–1.

The AL answered in the bottom half of the same inning when Cleveland shortstop Lou Boudreau (who had entered the game for Joe Cronin) singled home Joe DiMaggio for a 2–1 AL lead.

The top halves of the seventh and eighth innings saw the heroics of Arky Vaughan, who hit a two-run home run in each to also score two St. Louis Cardinals players: Enos Slaughter, who had opened the seventh inning with a single, and Johnny Mize, who had preceded Vaughan's round-tripper in the eighth with a one-out double.

With the score now 5–2 in favor of the National League the first pair of brothers to ever appear together in an All-Star Game cut into the NL lead, when Dom DiMaggio – in his first plate appearance of the game – singled home Joe after his one-out double.

In the ninth inning, White Sox pitcher Eddie Smith, who had given up one of Vaughan's home runs, retired the NL in order in his second inning of work. One of the three NL hitters to step to the plate that half-inning was pitcher Claude Passeau, who – with his team leading 5–3 – was not pulled for a pinch hitter, and thus returned to the mound in the bottom of the ninth for his third inning of work. (The only position player left on the NL bench, Cookie Lavagetto, was inserted as a pinch hitter one batter after Passeau's at-bat.)

With one out in the bottom of the ninth, three consecutive AL batters reached base, putting the tying and go-ahead runs on base and bringing Joe DiMaggio to the plate. The “Yankee Clipper” then hit what some sources describe as a routine double-play groundball, which would have ended the ballgame. However, the relay throw from second to first by Billy Herman pulled first baseman Frank McCormick off the bag and extended the game.

With the NL still leading 5–4 (a run had scored on DiMaggio's groundout), the AL now had the tying run on third and the winning run on first. Not electing to walk Ted Williams, which would have advanced the winning run to second base and brought Dom DiMaggio to the plate, NL manager Bill McKechnie let Passeau pitch to Williams. With the count two balls and one strike Williams hit a three-run home run off the third deck of the right field stands of Detroit's Briggs Stadium for a 7–5 American League victory.

== Context and aftermath ==
The 1941 All-Star Game took place in the midst of Joe DiMaggio’s 56-game hitting streak (but did not count towards it, as the All-Star Game is regarded as an exhibition game). DiMaggio had equaled the all-time record of 44 games, set by Willie Keeler in 1897, seven days prior to the All-Star Game and broken it the day after that (July 1 and 2, respectively). The streak would end nine days after the All-Star Game, when DiMaggio went hitless on July 17 against the Cleveland Indians.

Ted Williams, whose batting average was at .405 at the time of the All-Star Game, would even slightly improve on that hitting pace for the rest of the season and end the 1941 campaign at .406, making him the last hitter to reach the .400 mark for a season.

The 1941 Major League Baseball season, of which the All-Star Game marked the midway point, was the last played prior to the United States' entry into World War II. The juxtaposition of that memorable season taking place with the war looming is illustrated in the 1991 book Baseball in ’41 by renowned sportswriter Robert Creamer. Although the Major League season and the World Series would continue to be played during the war years, the All-Star Game was cancelled in 1945 due to wartime travel restrictions.

The fact that Arky Vaughan was eventually denied the accolades of being the player of the game despite his two home runs can be seen as symbolic of his entire career: Despite arguably being the preeminent offensive shortstop of his time, hitting .300 or higher in 12 of his 14 Major League seasons, Vaughan was not inducted into the Hall of Fame until 1985 (posthumously, by the Veterans Committee, nearly four decades after his last major league appearance) and is not remembered as vividly as many of the other stars of this era.
