= 1939 Major League Baseball All-Star Game =

1939 American baseball competition

	1	2	3	4	5	6	7	8	9	R	H	E
National League	0	0	1	0	0	0	0	0	0	1	7	1
American League	0	0	0	2	1	0	0	0	X	3	6	1
- Date: July 11, 1939
- Venue: Yankee Stadium
- City: Bronx, New York
- Managers: Gabby Hartnett (CHC); Joe McCarthy (NYY)
- Attendance: 62,892
- Ceremonial first pitch: None
- Radio: CBS; NBC; Mutual
- Radio announcers: France Laux, Arch McDonald and Mel Allen (CBS); Tom Manning, Paul Douglas and Warren Brown (NBC); Red Barber, Bob Elson and Al Helfer (Mutual)

The 1939 Major League Baseball All-Star Game was the seventh playing of the mid-summer classic between the all-stars of the American League (AL) and National League (NL), the two leagues comprising Major League Baseball. The game was held on July 11, 1939, at Yankee Stadium in The Bronx, New York City, the home of the New York Yankees of the American League. The game resulted in the American League defeating the National League 3–1. The Yankees went on the win the World Series that year, making them the first team to host the All-Star Game and win the World Series in the same year.

== Rosters ==
Players in italics have since been inducted into the National Baseball Hall of Fame.

=== National League ===
Starters
Position	Player	Team	All-Star Games
P	Paul Derringer	Reds	3
C	Ernie Lombardi	Reds	4
1B	Frank McCormick	Reds	2
2B	Lonny Frey	Reds	1
3B	Stan Hack	Cubs	2
SS	Arky Vaughan	Pirates	6
LF	Joe Medwick	Cardinals	6
CF	Mel Ott	Giants	6
RF	Ival Goodman	Reds	2

Pitchers
Position	Player	Team	All-Star Games
P	Curt Davis	Cardinals	2
P	Lou Fette	Bees	1
P	Bill Lee	Cubs	2
P	Johnny Vander Meer	Reds	2
P	Bucky Walters	Reds	2
P	Lon Warneke	Cardinals	4
P	Whit Wyatt	Dodgers	1

Reserves
Position	Player	Team	All-Star Games
C	Harry Danning	Giants	2
C	Babe Phelps	Dodgers	2
1B	Dolph Camilli	Dodgers	1
1B	Johnny Mize	Cardinals	2
2B	Billy Herman	Cubs	6
3B	Cookie Lavagetto	Dodgers	2
SS	Billy Jurges	Giants	2
OF	Morrie Arnovich	Phillies	1
OF	Terry Moore	Cardinals	1

=== American League ===
Starters
Position	Player	Team	All-Star Games
P	Red Ruffing	Yankees	3
C	Bill Dickey	Yankees	6
1B	Hank Greenberg	Tigers	3
2B	Joe Gordon	Yankees	1
3B	Red Rolfe	Yankees	3
SS	Joe Cronin	Red Sox	6
LF	George Selkirk	Yankees	2
CF	Joe DiMaggio	Yankees	4
RF	Doc Cramer	Red Sox	4

Pitchers
Position	Player	Team	All-Star Games
P	Tommy Bridges	Tigers	5
P	Bob Feller	Indians	2
P	Lefty Gomez	Yankees	7
P	Lefty Grove	Red Sox	6
P	Ted Lyons	White Sox	1
P	Johnny Murphy	Yankees	3
P	Bobo Newsom	Tigers	2

Reserves
Position	Player	Team	All-Star Games
C	Frankie Hayes	Athletics	1
C	Rollie Hemsley	Indians	3
1B	Jimmie Foxx	Red Sox	7
1B	Lou Gehrig	Yankees	7
1B	George McQuinn	Browns	1
SS	Luke Appling	White Sox	2
SS	Frankie Crosetti	Yankees	2
OF	George Case	Senators	1
OF	Myril Hoag	Browns	1
OF	Bob Johnson	Athletics	3

== Game ==
=== Umpires ===
Position	Umpire	League
Home Plate	Cal Hubbard	American
First Base	Larry Goetz	National
Second Base	Eddie Rommel	American
Third Base	George Magerkurth	National

The umpires changed assignments in the middle of the fifth inning – Hubbard and Magerkurth swapped positions, also Goetz and Rommel swapped positions.

=== Starting lineups ===
National League				American League			
Order	Player	Team	Position	Order	Player	Team	Position
1	Stan Hack	Cubs	3B	1	Doc Cramer	Red Sox	RF
2	Lonny Frey	Reds	2B	2	Red Rolfe	Yankees	3B
3	Ival Goodman	Reds	RF	3	Joe DiMaggio	Yankees	CF
4	Frank McCormick	Reds	1B	4	Bill Dickey	Yankees	C
5	Ernie Lombardi	Reds	C	5	Hank Greenberg	Tigers	1B
6	Joe Medwick	Cardinals	LF	6	Joe Cronin	Red Sox	SS
7	Mel Ott	Giants	CF	7	George Selkirk	Yankees	LF
8	Arky Vaughan	Pirates	SS	8	Joe Gordon	Yankees	2B
9	Paul Derringer	Reds	P	9	Red Ruffing	Yankees	P

=== Game summary ===
Tuesday, July 11, 1939 2:00 pm (ET) at Yankee Stadium in Bronx, New York
Team	1	2	3	4	5	6	7	8	9	R	H	E
National League	0	0	1	0	0	0	0	0	0	1	7	1
American League	0	0	0	2	1	0	0	0	X	3	6	1
WP: Tommy Bridges (1–0) LP: Bill Lee (0–1) Sv: Bob Feller (1); Home runs: NL: None; AL: Joe DiMaggio (1); Boxscore
