= List of Cincinnati Reds team records =

This is a list of team records for the Cincinnati Reds baseball team. The Reds do not recognize records set before 1900.

== Single-season leaders ==
=== Batting ===
- Average: Cy Seymour, .377 (1905)
- On-base percentage: Joe Morgan, .466 (1975)
- Slugging Percentage: Kevin Mitchell, .681 (1994)
- OPS: Kevin Mitchell, 1.110 (1994)
- At Bats: Pete Rose, 680 (1973)
- Runs: Frank Robinson, 134 (1962)
- Hits: Pete Rose, 230 (1973)
- Total Bases: George Foster, 388 (1977)
- Doubles: Frank Robinson/Pete Rose, 51 (1962/1978)
- Triples: John Reilly 26 (1890) - since 1900: 3 tied, 22 (multiple occasions)
- Home Runs: George Foster, 52 (1977)
- Runs batted in: George Foster, 149 (1977)
- Walks: Joey Votto, 143 (2015)
- Strikeouts: Drew Stubbs, 205 (2011)
- Stolen Bases: Hugh Nicol, 138 (1887) (stolen bases were scored differently in the 19th century) - since 1900: Bob Bescher, 81 (1911)
- Singles: Pete Rose, 181 (1973)
- Runs Created: Frank Robinson, 160 (1962)
- Extra-Base Hits: Frank Robinson, 92 (1962)
- Times on Base: Joey Votto, 321 (2017)
- Hit By Pitch: Shin-Soo Choo, 26 (2013)
- Sacrifice Hits: Jake Daubert, 39 (1919)
- Sacrifice Flies: Johnny Temple, 13 (1959)
- Grounded into Double Plays: Ernie Lombardi, 30 (1938)
- At Bats per Strikeout: Tommy Corcoran, 74.2 (1897) - since 1900: Frank McCormick, 46.4 (1941)
- At Bats per Home Run: Kevin Mitchell, 10.3 (1994)
- Outs: Woody Williams, 520 (1944)

=== Pitching ===
- Earned run average: Harry McCormick, 1.52 (1882) - since 1900: Fred Toney, 1.58 (1915)
- Wins: Will White, 43 (1883) - since 1900: Dolf Loque (1923) and Bucky Walters (1939), 27
- Won-Loss %: Tom Seaver, .875 (1981)
- Walks and hits per inning pitched: Trevor Bauer, 0.795 (2020)
- Hits Allowed/9IP: Trevor Bauer, 5.055 (2020)
- Walks/9IP: Red Lucas, .737 (1933)
- Strikeouts/9IP: Trevor Bauer, 12.329 (2020)
- Games: Wayne Granger, 90 (1969)
- Saves: Jeff Brantley, 44 (1996)
- Innings: Will White, 577.0 (1883) - since 1900: Noodles Hahn, 375 1/3
- Strikeouts: Mario Soto, 274 (1982)
- Games Started: Will White, 64 (1883) - since 1900: 3 tied, 3 (multiple occasions)
- Complete Games: Will White, 64 (1883) - since 1900: Noodles Hahn, 41 (1901)
- Shutouts: Will White, 8 (1882) - since 1900: 3 tied, 7 (multiple occasions)
- Home Runs Allowed: Bronson Arroyo, 46 (2011)
- Walks Allowed: Tony Mullane, 187 (1891) - since 1900: Johnny Vander Meer, 126 (1941)
- Hits Allowed: Tony Mullane, 501 (1886) - since 1900: Noodles Hahn, 370 (1901)
- Strikeout to Walk: Trevor Bauer, 5.882 (2020)
- Losses: Tony Mullane, 27 (1886) - since 1900: Paul Derringer, 25 (1933)
- Earned Runs Allowed: Tony Mullane, 218 (1886) - since 1900: Bill Phillips/Herm Wehmeier, 145 (1901/1950)
- Wild Pitches: Tony Mullane, 53 (1886) - since 1900: Scott Williamson, 21 (2000)
- Hit Batsmen: Will White, 35 (1884) - since 1900: Jake Weimer, 23 (1907)
- Batters Faced: Will White, 2,367 (1883) - since 1900: Noodles Hahn, 1,524 (1901)

== Career leaders ==
=== Batting ===
- Batting Average: Cy Seymour, .332
- On-base percentage: Joe Morgan, .415
- Slugging Percentage: Frank Robinson, .554
- OPS: Frank Robinson, .943
- Games: Pete Rose, 2,722
- At Bats: Pete Rose, 10,934
- Runs: Pete Rose, 1,741
- Hits: Pete Rose, 3,358
- Total Bases: Pete Rose, 4,645
- Doubles: Pete Rose, 601
- Triples: Bid McPhee, 189
- Home Runs: Johnny Bench, 389
- Runs batted in: Johnny Bench, 1,376
- Walks: Joey Votto, 1,365
- Strikeouts: Joey Votto, 1,640
- Stolen Bases: Bid McPhee, 568
- Singles: Pete Rose, 2,490
- Runs Created: Pete Rose, 1,805
- Extra-Base Hits: Pete Rose, 868
- Times on Base: Pete Rose, 4,654
- Hit By Pitch: Frank Robinson, 118
- Sacrifice Hits: Edd Roush, 186
- Sacrifice Flies: Johnny Bench, 90
- Intentional Walks: Joey Votto, 147
- Grounded into Double Plays: Dave Concepción, 266
- At Bats per Strikeout: John Corkhill, 41.4
- At Bats per Home Run: Adam Dunn, 14.4
- Outs: Pete Rose, 7,956

=== Pitching ===
- Earned run average: Andy Coakley, 2.11
- Wins: Eppa Rixey, 179
- Won-Loss %: Don Gullett, .674
- Walks and hits per inning pitched: Will White, 1.096
- Hits Allowed/9IP: Mario Soto, 7.256
- Walks/9IP: Red Lucas, 1.552
- Strikeouts/9IP: Luis Castillo, 9.769
- Games: Pedro Borbón, 531
- Saves: Danny Graves, 182
- Innings: Eppa Rixey, 2890 2/3
- Strikeouts: Jim Maloney, 1,592
- Games Started: Eppa Rixey, 357
- Complete Games: Tony Mullane, 264
- Shutouts: Bucky Walters, 32
- Home Runs Allowed: Bronson Arroyo, 275
- Walks Allowed: Johnny Vander Meer, 1,072
- Hits Allowed: Eppa Rixey, 3,115
- Strikeout to Walk: Aaron Harang, 3.187
- Losses: Dolf Luque, 152
- Earned Runs Allowed: Eppa Rixey, 1,068
- Wild Pitches: Tony Mullane, 184
- Hit Batsmen: Tony Mullane, 139
- Batters Faced: Eppa Rixey, 12,127
- Games Finished: Danny Graves, 337

== See also ==
- Baseball statistics
