= 1942 Major League Baseball All-Star Game =

1942 American baseball competition

	1	2	3	4	5	6	7	8	9	R	H	E
American League	3	0	0	0	0	0	0	0	0	3	7	0
National League	0	0	0	0	0	0	0	1	0	1	6	1
- Date: July 6, 1942
- Venue: Polo Grounds
- City: New York City
- Managers: Joe McCarthy (New York Yankees); Leo Durocher (Brooklyn Dodgers)
- Attendance: 33,694
- Radio: Mutual
- Radio announcers: Bob Elson, Mel Allen and Jim Britt

The 1942 Major League Baseball All-Star Game was the tenth playing of the midsummer classic between the all-stars of the American League (AL) and National League (NL), the two leagues comprising Major League Baseball. The game was held on July 6, 1942, at Polo Grounds in New York City the home of the New York Giants of the National League. The game resulted in the American League defeating the National League 3–1. While the game had been scheduled for a twilight start at 6:30 p.m. EWT, rain delayed the first pitch for an hour, leading to the first All-Star contest played entirely under the lights; the two-hour, seven-minute game ended just ahead of a 9:30 p.m. blackout curfew in New York.

One night later, the American League All-Stars traveled to Cleveland Municipal Stadium in Cleveland, Ohio, to play a special benefit game against a team of players from the U.S. Army and Navy. The contest, which the American Leaguers won 5–0, attracted a crowd of 62,094 and netted $70,000 for the Army Emergency Relief Fund and the Navy Relief Society. Mutual Radio broadcast the second game, with Bob Elson, Waite Hoyt, and Jack Graney announcing.

== Rosters ==
Players in italics have since been inducted into the National Baseball Hall of Fame.

=== National League ===
Starters
Position	Player	Team	All-Star Games
P	Mort Cooper	Cardinals	1
C	Walker Cooper	Cardinals	1
1B	Johnny Mize	Giants	5
2B	Jimmy Brown	Cardinals	1
3B	Arky Vaughan	Dodgers	9
SS	Eddie Miller	Braves	3
LF	Joe Medwick	Dodgers	9
CF	Pete Reiser	Dodgers	2
RF	Mel Ott	Giants	12

Pitchers
Position	Player	Team	All-Star Games
P	Paul Derringer	Reds	6
P	Carl Hubbell	Giants	9
P	Cliff Melton	Giants	1
P	Claude Passeau	Cubs	2
P	Ray Starr	Reds	1
P	Johnny Vander Meer	Reds	3
P	Bucky Walters	Reds	5
P	Whit Wyatt	Dodgers	4

Reserves
Position	Player	Team	All-Star Games
C	Ernie Lombardi	Braves	6
C	Mickey Owen	Dodgers	2
1B	Frank McCormick	Reds	5
2B	Billy Herman	Dodgers	9
3B	Bob Elliott	Pirates	2
SS	Pee Wee Reese	Dodgers	1
OF	Terry Moore	Cardinals	4
OF	Danny Litwhiler	Phillies	1
OF	Willard Marshall	Giants	1
OF	Enos Slaughter	Cardinals	2

=== American League ===
Starters
Position	Player	Team	All-Star Games
P	Spud Chandler	Yankees	1
C	Birdie Tebbetts	Tigers	2
1B	Rudy York	Tigers	3
2B	Joe Gordon	Yankees	4
3B	Ken Keltner	Indians	3
SS	Lou Boudreau	Indians	3
LF	Ted Williams	Red Sox	3
CF	Joe DiMaggio	Yankees	7
RF	Tommy Henrich	Yankees	1

Pitchers
Position	Player	Team	All-Star Games
P	Jim Bagby, Jr.	Indians	1
P	Al Benton	Tigers	2
P	Tiny Bonham	Yankees	1
P	Sid Hudson	Senators	2
P	Tex Hughson	Red Sox	1
P	Hal Newhouser	Tigers	1
P	Red Ruffing	Yankees	6
P	Eddie Smith	White Sox	2

Reserves
Position	Player	Team	All-Star Games
C	Bill Dickey	Yankees	9
C	Buddy Rosar	Yankees	1
C	Hal Wagner	Athletics	1
1B	George McQuinn	Browns	3
2B	Bobby Doerr	Red Sox	2
SS	Phil Rizzuto	Yankees	1
OF	Dom DiMaggio	Red Sox	2
OF	Bob Johnson	Athletics	5
OF	Stan Spence	Senators	1

== Game ==
=== Umpires ===
Position	Umpire	League
Home Plate	Lee Ballanfant	National League
First Base	Ernie Stewart (umpire) | American League	
Second Base	Al Barlick	National League
Third Base	Bill McGowan	American League

The umpires changed assignments in the middle of the fifth inning – Ballanfant and McGowan swapped positions, also Stewart and Barlick swapped positions.

=== Game summary ===
Monday, July 6, 1942 7:22 pm (ET) at Polo Grounds in Manhattan, New York
Team	1	2	3	4	5	6	7	8	9	R	H	E
American League	3	0	0	0	0	0	0	0	0	3	7	0
National League	0	0	0	0	0	0	0	1	0	1	6	1
WP: Spud Chandler (1–0) LP: Mort Cooper (0–1); Home runs: AL: Lou Boudreau (1), Rudy York (1); NL: Mickey Owen (1)
