= Johnny Murphy =

American baseball player (1908–1970)

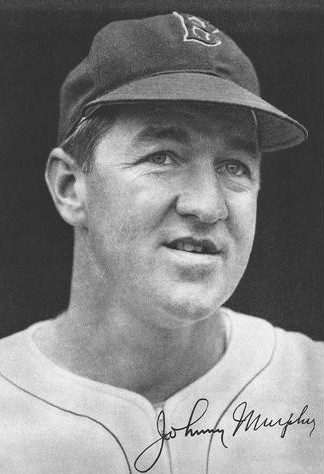
- Murphy in 1947
- Pitcher
- Born: July 14, 1908; New York City, New York, U.S.
- Died: January 14, 1970 (aged 61); New York City, New York, U.S.
- Batted: Right Threw: Right

MLB debut
- May 19, 1932, for the New York Yankees

Last MLB appearance
- September 16, 1947, for the Boston Red Sox

MLB statistics
- Win–loss record: 93–53
- Earned run average: 3.50
- Strikeouts: 378
- Saves: 107
- Stats at Baseball Reference

Teams
- New York Yankees (1932, 1934–1943, 1946); Boston Red Sox (1947)

Career highlights and awards
- 3× All-Star (1937–1939); 7× World Series champion (1932, 1936–1939, 1941, 1943); New York Mets Hall of Fame

John Joseph Murphy (July 14, 1908 – January 14, 1970) was an American All-Star right-handed relief pitcher in Major League Baseball (1932, 1934–1943, 1946–1947) who later became a front office executive in the game.

== Yankees' relief ace ==
After attending Fordham University in his native New York City, the 6 ft 2 in (1.88 m), 190 lb (86 kg) Murphy signed a professional contract with the New York Yankees in 1929. In 1934, his first full season with the Yankees, Murphy started 20 games (completing 10); for the remaining 11 years of his major league career, he would start only 20 games more, as he became one of the top bullpen specialists of his day. Moreover, his Yankees were one of the most powerful teams of all time, winning consecutive World Series championships from 1936 to 1939, and again in 1941 and 1943. Murphy's teammates included Lou Gehrig, Joe DiMaggio, Bill Dickey, Red Ruffing, Lefty Gomez—and, through 1934, Babe Ruth. Murphy spent his final year in the American League with the 1947 Boston Red Sox.

Overall, he appeared in 415 games, 383 as a Yankee, winning 93, losing 53 (for a winning percentage of .637) with an earned run average of 3.50. He led the AL in wins for a relief pitcher seven times. While the save was not then an official statistic, Murphy four times led the AL in that category, and he was the first pitcher to reach 100 career saves, finishing with 107. In 1,045 career innings pitched, he allowed more bases on balls (444) than strikeouts (378), and 985 hits. His career WHIP was 1.367.

In eight World Series games and 16 1/3 innings (spread over six different Series), Murphy won two games, lost none, saved four, and posted an ERA of 1.10. Nicknamed "Fordham Johnny", "Fireman" and "Grandma" (either for his rocking-chair pitching motion, or his fastidious nature), Murphy was on seven World Series winning teams, the most of any pitcher in history.

== Executive with Red Sox and Mets ==
When his playing days ended, Murphy briefly scouted for the Red Sox, then entered the Boston front office when owner Tom Yawkey appointed him Director of Minor League Operations. Murphy spent 13 seasons running the Red Sox' farm and scouting systems until his dismissal following the 1960 season. In 1961, he joined former Yankees farm director and general manager George Weiss in the front office of Gotham's National League expansion team, the New York Mets.

Rising to the position of vice president, Murphy briefly donned a uniform and joined the Mets' coaching staff for the final 11 games of the 1967 campaign during Salty Parker's term as acting manager. Then, following that season, Murphy returned to the Met front office and took over the general manager responsibilities when Bing Devine rejoined his longtime employers, the St. Louis Cardinals, in early December. As one of his final tasks, Devine secured the services of manager Gil Hodges, under contract to the Washington Senators, by sending Washington $100,000 and pitcher Bill Denehy on November 27, 1967, as compensation.

== Front-office boss of "Miracle Mets" ==
Murphy's promotion to the GM role coincided with the Mets' unveiling of some of the best young pitching talent of the era—including Tom Seaver, Nolan Ryan, Jerry Koosman, Tug McGraw, and others. The 1968 club posted 73 victories, best in their seven-season history, and finished out of the NL basement for only the second time.

Then, with Hodges in command—and with the contributions of Murphy acquisitions Tommie Agee, Donn Clendenon and Al Weis—the 1969 Miracle Mets stunned the baseball community by winning the National League East, sweeping Atlanta in the NLCS, then defeating a heavily favored Baltimore Orioles squad in five World Series games. The Sporting News named Murphy the 1969 winner of its Executive of the Year Award.

=== Death ===
However, only 21/2 months after the World Series, on December 30, Murphy was hospitalized after he suffered a heart attack. He died at age 61 early on January 14, 1970, in New York's Roosevelt Hospital. He was succeeded by Bob Scheffing. Murphy was interred in Woodlawn Cemetery in The Bronx.

His older brother Thomas was a federal prosecutor and judge.

== See also ==
- List of Major League Baseball annual saves leaders
- Major League Baseball titles leaders

Achievements
Preceded by Firpo Marberry	All-Time Saves Leader; 1946–1961	Succeeded by Roy Face
Sporting positions
Preceded by Bing Devine	New York Mets General manager 1967–1970	Succeeded by Bob Scheffing
