= Ernie Stewart (umpire) =

American baseball umpire (1909–2001)

- Born: Ernest Draper Stewart; July 28, 1909; Rocksprings, Texas, U.S.
- Died: November 15, 2001 (aged 92); Oceanside, California, U.S.
- Occupation: Umpire
- Years active: 1941–1945
- Employer: American League

Ernest Draper Stewart (July 28, 1909 – November 15, 2001) was an American professional baseball umpire who worked in the American League from 1941 to 1945. Stewart umpired 687 regular-season games in the major leagues during his five-year career. He also umpired in the 1942 All-Star Game.

On July 17, 1941, Stewart was umpiring at third base when Ken Keltner made two sharp defensive plays to help end Joe DiMaggio's 56-game hitting streak.

== See also ==
- List of Major League Baseball umpires (disambiguation)
