= Wally Berger =

American baseball player (1905–1988)

- Outfielder
- Born: October 10, 1905; Chicago, Illinois, U.S.
- Died: November 30, 1988 (aged 83); Redondo Beach, California, U.S.
- Batted: Right Threw: Right

MLB debut
- April 15, 1930, for the Boston Braves

Last MLB appearance
- July 2, 1940, for the Philadelphia Phillies

MLB statistics
- Batting average: .300
- Home runs: 242
- Runs batted in: 898
- Stats at Baseball Reference

Teams
- Boston Braves / Bees (1930–1937); New York Giants (1937–1938); Cincinnati Reds (1938–1940); Philadelphia Phillies (1940)

Career highlights and awards
- 4× All-Star (1933–1936); NL home run leader (1935); NL RBI leader (1935); Braves Hall of Fame

Walter Anton Berger (October 10, 1905 – November 30, 1988) was an American professional baseball player, scout and manager. He played in Major League Baseball (MLB) as an outfielder from 1930 to 1940, most prominently as a member of the Boston Braves, where he was four-time All-Star player and was one of the most prolific power hitters of his era before injuries prematurely ended his playing career after just 10 seasons.

In his first season as a major league player, Berger hit 38 home runs to set a home run record for rookies which stood for 57 years. He averaged 28 home runs and 103 runs batted in along with a .307 batting average over the first seven years of his career, and was the starting center fielder for the National League (NL) in the first All-Star Game.

Berger played in relative obscurity for the perennially losing Braves teams of the 1930s. In 1935 he led the NL with 34 home runs and 130 runs batted in despite the Braves having the fourth-most losses in MLB history. His 190 home runs hit as a Brave are a Boston franchise record and, he was the seventh NL player to hit 200 career home runs.

Berger also played for the New York Giants, Cincinnati Reds and the Philadelphia Phillies. He appeared in two World Series campaigns later in his career with the Giants in 1937 and the Reds in 1939, losing both times to the New York Yankees. After serving as a baseball coach in the United States Navy during World War II, Berger worked as a scout for the Giants and Yankees and managed in the Yankees minor league organization.

== Early life ==
Born in Chicago but raised in San Francisco, Berger played third base for Mission High School, sharing the infield with future Hall of Fame shortstop and American League president Joe Cronin, who manned second base.

== Professional career ==
Through 2026, he was one of five players to hit 20 or more home runs in their rookie year before July, along with Albert Pujols (2001), Joc Pederson (2015), Cody Bellinger (2017), and Pete Alonso (2019). Berger's 38 home runs as a rookie in 1930 established a major league record that would stand for 57 years until eclipsed by Mark McGwire's 49 in 1987; his NL record was tied by Frank Robinson in 1956, and broken by Cody Bellinger's 39 in 2017. Pete Alonso hit 53 in 2019. Berger still shares the record for being the fastest player to hit 20 home runs (51 games), shared with Gary Sánchez (who accomplished the feat on September 27, 2016) and Cody Bellinger (June 19, 2017). Berger batted .310 that season, and his 119 runs batted in were also an NL rookie record, since topped by Albert Pujols in 2001.

Berger made the NL All-Star team in the first four years the game was held (1933–1936), starting in the first two. In 1933 he finished third in the Most Valuable Player voting, behind Carl Hubbell and Chuck Klein, after hitting 27 home runs (half the Braves team total), second in the league behind Klein's 28. Of the eighteen players who started the 1934 All-Star Game, Berger is the only player not elected to the Major League Baseball Hall of Fame. In 1935, he led NL outfielders in putouts with 458. Eddie Mathews broke his Braves franchise record of 38 home runs in 1953, the team's first year in Milwaukee, and surpassed his mark of 199 career home runs in 1957.

Berger's productiveness was lessened by a shoulder and hand injury during the 1936 season. Berger was traded to the New York Giants in June 1937; his first home run for the team was the 200th of his career. In the 1937 World Series, he made only three pinch-hitting appearances, going hitless. In June 1938 he was traded to the Cincinnati Reds, where he would remain until 1940; his 1939 World Series performance was even more dismal than in 1937, going 0 for 15. He ended his career in 1940 with the Philadelphia Phillies.

In 1,350 games over an 11-season career, Berger posted a .300 batting average (1550-for-5163) with 809 runs, 299 doubles, 59 triples, 242 home runs, 898 RBI, 435 walks, .359 on-base percentage and .522 slugging percentage. Defensively, he recorded an overall .975 fielding percentage playing at all three outfield positions and first base.

== Post-playing career ==
Following his retirement as a player, he was a scout for the New York Yankees and managed their Manchester, New Hampshire, minor league team in 1949.

Berger died of a stroke in Redondo Beach, California, in 1988. He was interred at Inglewood Park Cemetery in Inglewood, California.

== See also ==
- List of Major League Baseball career home run leaders
- List of athletes on Wheaties boxes
- List of Major League Baseball annual runs batted in leaders
- List of Major League Baseball annual home run leaders
