= Lonny Frey =

American baseball player (1910–2009)

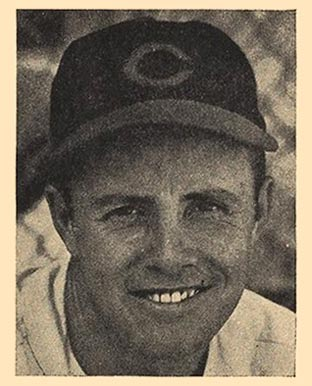
- Second baseman / Shortstop
- Born: August 23, 1910; St. Louis, Missouri, U.S.
- Died: September 13, 2009 (aged 99); Coeur d'Alene, Idaho, U.S.
- Batted: Left Threw: Right

MLB debut
- August 29, 1933, for the Brooklyn Dodgers

Last MLB appearance
- September 28, 1948, for the New York Giants

MLB statistics
- Batting average: .269
- Home runs: 61
- Runs batted in: 549
- Stats at Baseball Reference

Teams
- Brooklyn Dodgers (1933–1936); Chicago Cubs (1937); Cincinnati Reds (1938–1946); Chicago Cubs (1947); New York Yankees (1947–1948); New York Giants (1948)

Career highlights and awards
- 3× All-Star (1939, 1941, 1943); 2× World Series champion (1940, 1947); NL stolen base leader (1940); Cincinnati Reds Hall of Fame

Linus Reinhard Frey (August 23, 1910 – September 13, 2009) was an American infielder in Major League Baseball who played from 1933 through 1948 for the Brooklyn Dodgers (1933–1936), Chicago Cubs (1937, 1947), Cincinnati Reds (1938–1943, 1946), New York Yankees (1947–1948), and New York Giants (1948). He was born in Saint Louis, Missouri, and was listed as 5 feet 10 inches (1.78 m) tall and 160 pounds (73 kg).

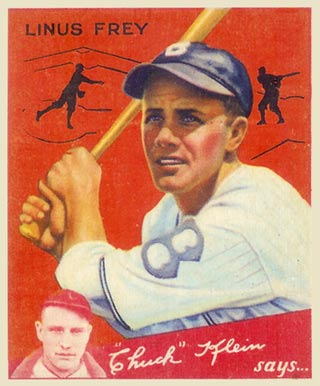
Baseball card of Frey

Frey began his career as a switch hitter and continued to bat from both sides of the plate until the end of 1938. Starting in 1939, he batted exclusively from the left side of the plate. He started at shortstop with the Brooklyn Dodgers in 1933 and switched to second base after leading the National League in errors in 1935 (44) and 1936 (51). Traded to the Chicago Cubs before the 1937 season he developed as a competent second baseman.

Frey enjoyed his best years with the Cincinnati Reds, helping them to reach two consecutive World Series in 1939 and 1940, after hitting .291 with 11 home runs and 95 runs (1939) and leading the National League with 22 stolen bases (1940) while scoring 102 runs. Five days before the 1940 World Series against Detroit, Frey injured his foot when he dropped the iron lid of the dugout water cooler on it. Eddie Joost replaced him at second base for the series.

A three-time All-Star (1939, 1941, 1943) Frey also led the NL second basemen twice each in fielding percentage and double plays (1940 and 1943). After missing two full seasons while serving in World War II, his career faded. In 1947 he divided his playing time between the Cubs and the New York Yankees, and he was a member of the Yankees team that won the 1947 World Series. He played his final game with the New York Giants in 1948.

In a 14-season career, Frey was a .269 hitter with 61 home runs, 549 RBI, 848 runs, 1,482 hits, 105 stolen bases, and a .359 on-base percentage in 1,535 games played. He recorded a .960 fielding percentage.

In 1961 Frey was inducted into the Cincinnati Reds Hall of Fame, and in 1969, as part of the franchise's 100th anniversary, was selected the Reds all-time second baseman.

Frey died in Coeur d'Alene, Idaho, at the age of 99. At the time of his death, he was recognized as the second-oldest living major league ballplayer, the oldest living All-Star, and the last living player to play for all three New York baseball teams in the 1930s and 1940s.

== See also ==
- List of Major League Baseball annual stolen base leaders
