= Babe Dahlgren =

American baseball player (1912–1996)

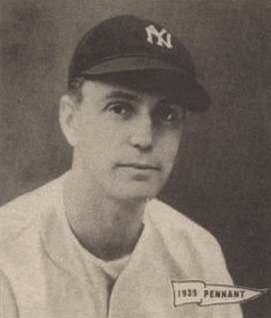
- First baseman
- Born: June 15, 1912; San Francisco, California, U.S.
- Died: September 4, 1996 (aged 84); Arcadia, California, U.S.
- Batted: Right Threw: Right

MLB debut
- April 16, 1935, for the Boston Red Sox

Last MLB appearance
- September 3, 1946, for the St. Louis Browns

MLB statistics
- Batting average: .261
- Home runs: 82
- Runs batted in: 569
- Stats at Baseball Reference

Teams
- Boston Red Sox (1935–1936); New York Yankees (1937–1940); Boston Braves (1941); Chicago Cubs (1941–1942); St. Louis Browns (1942); Brooklyn Dodgers (1942); Philadelphia Phillies (1943); Pittsburgh Pirates (1944–1945); St. Louis Browns (1946)

Career highlights and awards
- All-Star (1943); World Series champion (1939)

Ellsworth Tenney "Babe" Dahlgren (June 15, 1912 – September 4, 1996) was an American professional baseball infielder. He played twelve seasons in Major League Baseball from 1935 to 1946 for the Boston Red Sox, New York Yankees, Boston Braves, Chicago Cubs, St. Louis Browns, Brooklyn Dodgers, Philadelphia Phillies, and Pittsburgh Pirates.

Dahlgren is best remembered for replacing Lou Gehrig in the lineup on May 2, 1939, which ended Gehrig's 14-year, 2,130 consecutive game streak. Dahlgren hit a home run and a double as the Yankees routed Detroit 22–2. He went on to hit 15 home runs and drive in 89 runs for the season for the Yankees.

The Browns returned Dahlgren to the Cubs for a contract dispute once it was learned that he had become eligible for the draft in May 1942. He was sold to the Dodgers soon after. In August 1942 he sought voluntary retirement. In early 1943, Dahlgren was notified by the draft board to report for his physical, which occurred in mid-May of that year. After passing his physical, Dahlgren was to be inducted into the military in July 1943. In July 1943, he played on the National League All-star team. In October 1943, Dahlgren was rejected for military service due to a sinus condition.

== Highlights ==
- Had a 621 consecutive game streak with the San Francisco Missions of the Pacific Coast League from 1931 to 1934
- Member of the 1934 Pacific Coast League All-Star Team as a first baseman for the Mission Reds
- Member of the 1936 International League All-Star Team as a first baseman for the Syracuse Chiefs
- Member of the 1937 International League All-Star Team as a third baseman for Newark Bears
- Member of 1938–1939 New York Yankees World Series Champions
- Hit the first home run of the 1939 World Series in game 2 off of Bucky Walters
- Named to 1943 National League All-Star Team as an infielder for the Philadelphia Phillies
- Presided over the first American League pension plan meeting in 1946
- Briefly returned to the majors as a coach for the 1964 Kansas City Athletics

== Personal life ==
Dahlgren was married twice. His first wife was Josephine Greco whom he married on September 30, 1932. The marriage ended in divorce on December 14, 1941 on the grounds that his wife had deserted him. He remarried to Mabel Virginia Decker on January 1, 1942. Mabel and Babe had two sons: Raymond and Donald. His grandson, Matt Dahlgren, is an author of multiple baseball books.

Dahlgren was a pioneer of in-game film study.

After years of dementia, Dahlgren died of natural causes in Arcadia, California on September 4, 1996.
