= Dick West (baseball) =

American baseball player (1915–1996)

- Catcher
- Born: November 24, 1915; Louisville, Kentucky, U.S.
- Died: March 13, 1996 (aged 80); Fort Wayne, Indiana, U.S.
- Batted: Right Threw: Right

MLB debut
- September 29, 1938, for the Cincinnati Reds

Last MLB appearance
- May 9, 1943, for the Cincinnati Reds

MLB statistics
- Batting average: .221
- Home runs: 3
- Runs batted in: 35
- Stats at Baseball Reference

Teams
- Cincinnati Reds (1938–1943)

Richard Thomas West (November 24, 1915 – March 13, 1996) was an American professional baseball player. He was a catcher over parts of six seasons (1938–43) with the Cincinnati Reds. For his career, he compiled a .221 batting average in 299 at-bats, with three home runs and 35 runs batted in.

An alumnus of Georgia Southwestern State University, he was born in Louisville, Kentucky and died in Fort Wayne, Indiana at the age of 80.
