= Junior Thompson =

American baseball player (1917–2006)

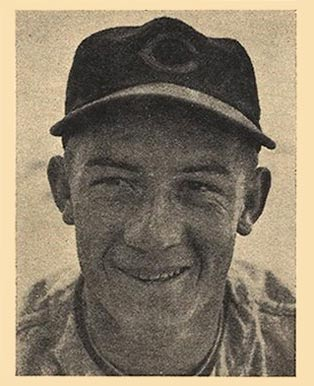
- Pitcher
- Born: June 7, 1917; Latham, Illinois, U.S.
- Died: August 24, 2006 (aged 89); Scottsdale, Arizona, U.S.
- Batted: Right Threw: Right

MLB debut
- April 26, 1939, for the Cincinnati Reds

Last MLB appearance
- July 4, 1947, for the New York Giants

MLB statistics
- Win–loss record: 47–35
- Earned run average: 3.26
- Strikeouts: 315
- Stats at Baseball Reference

Teams
- Cincinnati Reds (1939–1942); New York Giants (1946–1947)

Career highlights and awards
- World Series champion (1940)

Junior Eugene Thompson (June 7, 1917 – August 24, 2006), also known as Gene Thompson, was an American right-handed pitcher in Major League Baseball who played for the Cincinnati Reds and New York Giants.

Born in Latham, Illinois, Thompson made his professional debut in the Reds' farm system in 1935. After a year off, he spent 1937 and 1938 with several minor league teams, primarily the Syracuse Chiefs. He was promoted to the Reds the following year and made his major league debut on April 26, 1939.

Thompson played for the Reds between 1939 and 1942, earning 39 wins against 27 losses. He was 13–5 as a rookie, but lost Game 3 of the World Series against the New York Yankees as the Reds were swept. Thompson was a member of the Reds team that won the 1940 World Series against the Detroit Tigers, achieving a 16–9 record in the regular season although he was ineffective in his only Series start in Game 5. He played for the Giants in 1947–48, posting an 8–8 record. He ended his career with a record of 47–35, a 3.26 earned run average and 315 strikeouts in 185 games and 686 2/3 innings pitched.

In between playing for the Reds and Giants, Thompson served in the United States Navy during World War II.

After his career ended, Thompson became a scout for the Giants, by then in San Francisco, serving in that capacity for 40 years. He worked briefly for the Cleveland Indians and Chicago Cubs before finishing his career with the San Diego Padres, finally retiring in 2005. He died at age 89 in Scottsdale, Arizona.
