= Willard Hershberger =

American baseball player (1910–1940)

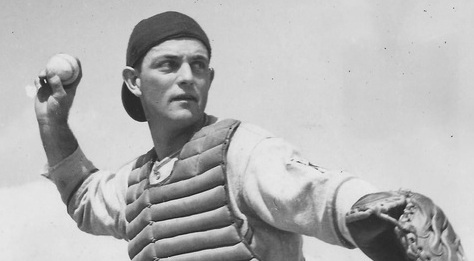
- Hershberger, circa 1939
- Catcher
- Born: May 28, 1910; Lemon Cove, California, U.S.
- Died: August 3, 1940 (aged 30); Boston, Massachusetts, U.S.
- Batted: Right Threw: Right

MLB debut
- April 19, 1938, for the Cincinnati Reds

Last MLB appearance
- August 2, 1940, for the Cincinnati Reds

MLB statistics
- Batting average: .316
- Home runs: 0
- Runs batted in: 70
- Stats at Baseball Reference

Teams
- Cincinnati Reds (1938–1940)

Willard McKee Hershberger (May 28, 1910 – August 3, 1940) was an American professional baseball catcher for the Cincinnati Reds of Major League Baseball (MLB) from 1938 to 1940. In 160 career games, Hershberger recorded a batting average of .316 and accumulated 5 triples and 41 runs. He is the only major league player to date to die by suicide during the season.

Born and raised in California, Hershberger attended Fullerton Union High School where he was a baseball standout. He was signed by the New York Yankees and was part of their minor league system for eight years. He was traded after the 1937 season to the Cincinnati Reds, where he found a place on the major league roster as a backup behind Ernie Lombardi. For three seasons, Hershberger played in relief of Lombardi, stepping in if he needed a day off or was injured. After a slump in late July and early August, Hershberger died by suicide on August 3, 1940, in his hotel room; the Reds went on to win the 1940 World Series.

== Early life ==
Willard Hershberger was born in Lemon Cove, California. His family moved to Fullerton, California, when his father, Claude, got a job working in the city's oil fields. He lived in Fullerton with his father, his mother Maude, and his sister Lois. Hershberger attended Fullerton Union High School, where he distinguished himself on both the baseball and football teams, playing alongside Arky Vaughan and future President Richard Nixon. The 1926 baseball team won the California Interscholastic Federation championship, and in 2003, he was named to the school's All-Time baseball team.

Claude, Willard's father, was depressed over financial problems, and on November 21, 1928, he fatally shot himself with a shotgun in the family home's bathroom; Willard, then 18, discovered the body. Hershberger graduated high school in 1929; the high school yearbook called Hershberger "the boy with the golden toe" for his status as the football team's placekicker and "the greatest little catcher to ever put on the Fullerton uniform." In 1930, scouts Bill Essick of the New York Yankees and Art Griggs of the Pittsburgh Pirates came to Fullerton to watch Vaughan and Hershberger play, respectively. Essick took a detour and Griggs ended up signing Vaughan instead, while Essick signed Hershberger to a contract to play in the Yankees organization.

== Minor league career ==
Hershberger made his professional debut with the El Paso Texans of the Arizona–Texas League, playing for them in 1930 and 1931; in 1931 he had a batting average of .356. He spent the 1932 season with three minor league teams, and mostly played for the Erie Sailors of the Central League where he hit .339 in 94 games. The following year, Hershberger was promoted to the Binghamton Triplets of the New York–Pennsylvania League (NYPL). For the season, he had a .306 batting average, was named to the NYPL All-Star Team, and helped the Triplets win the NYPL title. In 1934, he was promoted to the Hollywood Stars of the Pacific Coast League (PCL), and had a .307 batting average and 18 doubles in 114 games. Hershberger was promoted to the Newark Bears of the International League in 1935, and had a batting average of .310. The following year, he split time with the Bears and the Oakland Oaks of the PCL. At one point in the season, he was batting .313, and was noted as a player who should have a shot at the major leagues. By the end of the season, his average went down to .263 over 89 games.

The 1937 season started off poorly for Hershberger. While he remained with the Newark Bears, the Yankees released him from his contract, and partly because of the success of catcher Bill Dickey, the Yankees no longer had an interest in Hershberger. He spent the full season with the Bears, splitting time with Buddy Rosar at catcher. The team ended up with a 109–43 record and the International League title; the Bears have been called the third greatest minor league team in history by Minor League Baseball. Hershberger hit 15 doubles and had a .325 average in 96 games, and hit .364 in the Junior Series against the Columbus Red Birds. As a result, Yankees owner Jacob Ruppert noted that he would spend the offseason working to get the players on major league rosters. On December 3, 1937, Hershberger was traded to the Cincinnati Reds for shortstop Eddie Miller and $40,000, ending his tenure in the Yankees organization.

== Cincinnati Reds ==
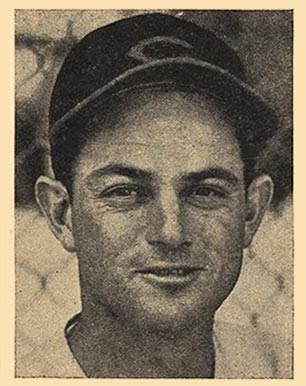
Hershberger in 1940

Reds manager Bill McKechnie noted that Hershberger was playing so well in spring training that there was the possibility of him beating out Ernie Lombardi for the starting catcher job in 1938. He made the roster and served as the backup to Lombardi that season, and played in 49 games and had a .276 batting average. He earned the nickname of "Little Slug" for his pinch hitting, and as a contrast to Lombardi's nickname of "Big Slug". In 1939, Hershberger gained extra playing time when Lombardi was injured in June; during that stretch, Hershberger had eight hits and five runs batted in in five games. For the season, he hit .345 in 63 games, and played in 2 games of the 1939 World Series against the Yankees. In the series, he had one hit in two at-bats as the Reds lost in four games. His one hit in the World Series brought in the tying run in Game 4, but the Yankees fought back to win the game and the series.

Hershberger spent the 1940 Cincinnati Reds season as the backup to Lombardi, as had been the case the previous two seasons. He had been hitting well in relief of Lombardi, and had a batting average of .429 at the end of May and .345 at the end of June. In July, Lombardi suffered an injured finger, and Hershberger's playing time increased that month as a result. Lombardi then sprained his ankle on July 26, putting Hershberger in the starting role indefinitely; at the time his batting average was .354. However, in a game against the New York Giants at the Polo Grounds on July 31, the Reds took a 4–1 lead into the ninth and lost 5–4, with the comeback capped by a game-ending home run by Harry Danning. After an off day for the team, the Reds lost both games of a doubleheader on August 2 to the Boston Bees, by scores of 10–3 and 4–3. Hershberger played in the second game and went hitless in six trips to the plate.

== Death ==
Hershberger blamed himself for the losses to the Giants and Bees, telling third baseman Billy Werber that "If Ernie had been catching, we wouldn't have lost those ball games." He felt he called the wrong pitch to Danning, resulting in the home run. In the game against the Bees, Hershberger failed to field a bunt, and after the game alluded to his father's suicide to McKechnie in private, saying "My father killed himself, and I'm gonna do it too." However, after about an hour, Hershberger had calmed down considerably, and McKechnie believed he would be fine.

The following afternoon, Reds publicist and traveling secretary Gabe Paul called Hershberger's room at the Copley Plaza Hotel after Hershberger missed batting practice. He said that he was not going to play that afternoon because he was not feeling well; McKechnie, worried, wanted him there in street clothes, and Hershberger agreed. After he missed the first game of another doubleheader against the Bees, McKechnie had Dan Cohen, a friend of Hershberger's, head to the hotel to check in on him. He found the door locked, and asked an employee to open the door. Inside, Cohen found Hershberger's body by the bathtub with his throat slit. After the second game, McKechnie had coach Hank Gowdy bring all the players together in the locker room, stating, "I want to tell you something. Willard Hershberger has just destroyed himself."

After giving his team the news, McKechnie had the Reds dedicate themselves to winning the World Series "for Hershie". His number 5 was retired for the season by the team as a tribute. It would later be permanently retired in honor of the Reds' Hall of Fame catcher, Johnny Bench. McKechnie never publicly revealed what Willard Hershberger said to him during their meeting the day before: "It had nothing to do with anybody on the team", he told reporters. "He told it to me in confidence, and I will not utter it to anyone". The Cincinnati Reds would go on to defeat the American League champion Detroit Tigers in seven games to win the 1940 World Series. Reds players decided to share a portion of their championship money, totaling $5,803, with Hershberger's mother, Maude. Hershberger was buried at Visalia Public Cemetery in Visalia, California.

== See also ==
- List of baseball players who died during their careers
- List of suicides (A–M)
