= Milt Shoffner =

American baseball player (1905–1978)

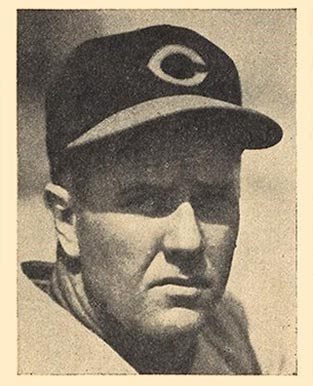
- Pitcher
- Born: November 13, 1905; Sherman, Texas, U.S.
- Died: January 19, 1978 (aged 72); Madison, Ohio, U.S.
- Batted: Left Threw: Left

MLB debut
- July 20, 1929, for the Cleveland Indians

Last MLB appearance
- September 22, 1940, for the Cincinnati Reds

MLB statistics
- Win–loss record: 25–26
- Earned run average: 4.59
- Strikeouts: 180
- Stats at Baseball Reference

Teams
- Cleveland Indians (1929–1931); Boston Bees (1937–1939); Cincinnati Reds (1939–1940)

Milburn James Shoffner (November 13, 1905 – January 19, 1978) was an American Major League Baseball pitcher. He played seven years in the majors, from 1929 until 1931, then again from 1937 until 1940.

Shoffner debuted in the majors with the Cleveland Indians in 1929 and pitched three seasons for them. In 1930 and 1931, his ERA was over 7.00, and by mid-season he was pitching for the Toledo Mud Hens. Shoffner did not return to the major leagues until 1937, with the Boston Bees. That season, he made six appearances—five of them starts—with an impressive 2.53 ERA.

That performance led to a larger role on the 1938 team, and while his performance slipped a bit, his record was a respectable 8–7 with a 3.54 ERA. Despite getting off to a good start in 1939, Shoffner was waived by the Bees and claimed by the Cincinnati Reds. Overall that season, Shoffner finished 6th in the league in ERA at 3.18 in 170 innings (a career high). Despite this, he did not appear in the 1939 World Series for the Reds.

The following season, Shoffner had a rougher go, as his ERA slipped back to 5.63 and he was mostly limited to mop-up duty. Once again, he did not appear in the 1940 World Series, which the Reds won. During the offseason, Shoffner was traded to the New York Giants for infielder Wayne Ambler, and after pitching one last season in the minors he retired.

Following his playing days, Shoffner worked as a minor league baseball umpire in the late 1940s and as a bar owner in the early 1950s. He died in Madison, Ohio, on January 19, 1978.
