= Terry Moore (baseball) =

American baseball player, manager, and coach (1912–1995)

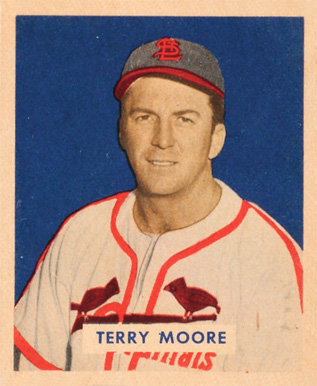
- Center fielder / Manager
- Born: May 27, 1912; Vernon, Alabama, U.S.
- Died: March 29, 1995 (aged 82); Collinsville, Illinois, U.S.
- Batted: Right Threw: Right

MLB debut
- April 16, 1935, for the St. Louis Cardinals

Last MLB appearance
- September 24, 1948, for the St. Louis Cardinals

MLB statistics
- Batting average: .280
- Home runs: 80
- Runs batted in: 513
- Managerial record: 35–42
- Winning %: .455
- Stats at Baseball Reference
- Managerial record at Baseball Reference

Teams
- As player: St. Louis Cardinals (1935–1942, 1946–1948); As manager: Philadelphia Phillies (1954); As coach: St. Louis Cardinals (1949–1952, 1956–1958)

Career highlights and awards
- 4× All-Star (1939–1942); 2× World Series champion (1942, 1946); St. Louis Cardinals Hall of Fame

Terry Bluford Moore (May 27, 1912 – March 29, 1995) was an American professional baseball center fielder, manager, and coach. He played 11 seasons in Major League Baseball (MLB) for the St. Louis Cardinals from 1935 to 1948, and later coached for them from 1949 to 1958. Moore also briefly managed the 1954 Philadelphia Phillies, taking the reins from Steve O’Neill, for the second half of the season.

== Playing career ==
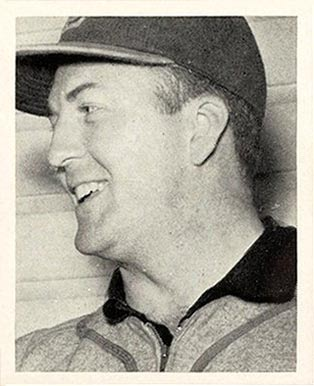
Moore in 1941

A right-handed batter and thrower, Moore began his professional baseball career in 1932. In 1934, he hit .328 in the American Association and earned a roster spot with the Cardinals the following season.

Moore joined the Cardinals the year after the Gashouse Gang won the 1934 World Series. He hit for a career .280 batting average in 1,298 games, with 80 home runs. He played on two National League championship and world champion teams: the 1942 and 1946 Cardinals. During his career (interrupted by World War II service), he played with greats such as Dizzy Dean, Joe Medwick, Frankie Frisch, Johnny Mize, Enos Slaughter, and Stan Musial — all members of the Baseball Hall of Fame. However, Moore was the captain of those Cardinals teams.

On September 5, 1935, Moore went 6-for-6 against the Boston Braves in a 15-3 rout at Sportsman's Park.

Moore was also known for being a great center fielder, who would have won several Gold Gloves had the award been available. Moore compiled a career .985 fielding percentage at that position. He was an All-Star for four straight seasons, from 1939 to 1942.

== Later life ==
When his playing days ended, Moore served two terms (1949–52; 1956–58) as a Cardinals coach. He also managed the Philadelphia Phillies in 1954. After beginning the 1954 season as a Phillies scout, he replaced Steve O'Neill as the club's manager on July 15. He managed the Phils for exactly half a season — 77 games — and the team won 35 of those games (for a winning percentage of .455).

== See also ==
- List of Major League Baseball single-game hits leaders
- List of Major League Baseball players who spent their entire career with one franchise
- List of Philadelphia Phillies managers
- List of St. Louis Cardinals coaches
