= 1939 World Series =

1939 Major League Baseball championship series

| Team (Wins) | Managers | Season |
|---|---|---|
| New York Yankees (4) | Joe McCarthy | 106–45, .702, GA: 17 |
| Cincinnati Reds (0) | Bill McKechnie | 97–57, .630, GA: 4 1/2 |
- Dates: October 4–8
- Venue(s): Yankee Stadium (New York); Crosley Field (Cincinnati)
- Umpires: Bill McGowan (AL), Beans Reardon (NL), Bill Summers (AL), Babe Pinelli (NL)
- Hall of Famers: Umpire: Bill McGowan; Yankees: Joe McCarthy (mgr.); Bill Dickey; Joe DiMaggio; Lefty Gomez; Joe Gordon; Red Ruffing; Reds: Bill McKechnie (mgr.); Ernie Lombardi; Al Simmons

Broadcast
- Radio: Mutual
- Radio announcers: Red Barber and Bob Elson

The 1939 World Series was the championship series in Major League Baseball for the 1939 season. The 36th edition of the World Series, it featured the three-time defending champion New York Yankees against the Cincinnati Reds, who were making their first Series appearance since winning the scandal-tainted 1919 World Series. The Yankees swept the Series in four games for the second straight year, winning their record fourth consecutive title (they would later win five straight from 1949 to 1953). Yankee manager Joe McCarthy won his fifth title, tying the record held by Philadelphia Athletics manager Connie Mack.

In the 10th inning of the final game, a famous play at the plate typified the Series. "King Kong" Charlie Keller scored when he and the ball both collided with catcher "Schnoz" Ernie Lombardi, and then Joe DiMaggio also scored while Lombardi, rolling on the ground, tried in vain to retrieve the ball. Lombardi had been smacked in the groin, but the press reported it as Lombardi "napping" at the plate.

The Yankees matched the Reds in hits with 27, but out-homered them 7–0 and out-scored them 20–8. Keller led the Yanks with seven hits, three home runs, six RBI, eight runs scored, a .438 average and a 1.188 slugging percentage. Both teams played sterling defense for most of the series until the ninth inning of Game 4. Up until then the Reds matched the Yankees with committing just one error for the series. But Cincinnati committed a total of three errors in the ninth and 10th innings of Game 4 which led to five unearned runs, sealing the New York sweep.

Keller broke the record for most homers by a rookie in a World Series game with two in Game 3. Also in Game 3, Junior Thompson gave up five hits in 4 2/3 innings worked. Four of the five were home runs, tying the record for long balls allowed during a Series game set by the Cubs' Charlie Root in 1932.

Despite the loss, the Reds were an organization on the rise, having improved from eighth and last in the National League in 1937 (56–98, .364) to fourth in '38 (82–68, .547) and first as NL champions in '39. Ironically, despite being dominated by the Bronx Bombers in the 1939 Series, the Reds would return in 1940 to win the World Series while the Yankees finished behind Detroit and Cleveland in the AL pennant race, snapping their consecutive World Series streak at four.

The Yankees and Reds would not meet again in the World Series until 1961 — a 5-game Yankees win. The two teams would meet again in 1976, with the Reds winning in a 4-game sweep.

At a cumulative time of seven hours and five minutes, the 1939 World Series is one of the shortest World Series in real time, and was shorter than the third game of the 2018 World Series that lasted 7 hours, 20 minutes and was 18 innings long.

== Summary ==
AL New York Yankees (4) vs. NL Cincinnati Reds (0)

| Game | Date | Score | Location | Time | Attendance |
|---|---|---|---|---|---|
| 1 | October 4 | Cincinnati Reds – 1, New York Yankees – 2 | Yankee Stadium | 1:33 | 58,541 |
| 2 | October 5 | Cincinnati Reds – 0, New York Yankees – 4 | Yankee Stadium | 1:27 | 59,791 |
| 3 | October 7 | New York Yankees – 7, Cincinnati Reds – 3 | Crosley Field | 2:01 | 32,723 |
| 4 | October 8 | New York Yankees – 7, Cincinnati Reds – 4 (10) | Crosley Field | 2:04 | 32,794 |

== Matchups ==
=== Game 1 ===
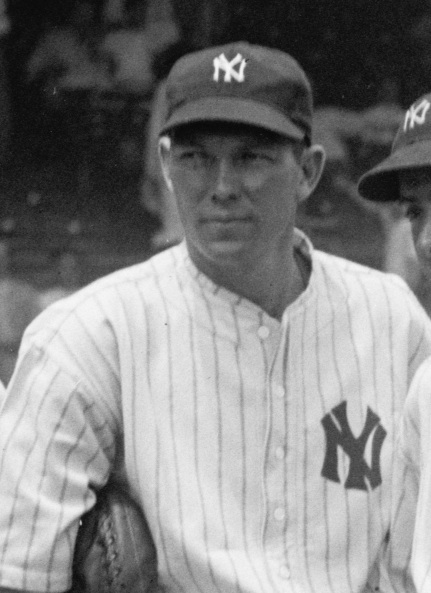
Bill Dickey

Wednesday, October 4, 1939 1:30 pm (ET) at Yankee Stadium in Bronx, New York
| Team | 1 | 2 | 3 | 4 | 5 | 6 | 7 | 8 | 9 | R | H | E |
|---|---|---|---|---|---|---|---|---|---|---|---|---|
| Cincinnati | 0 | 0 | 0 | 1 | 0 | 0 | 0 | 0 | 0 | 1 | 4 | 0 |
| New York | 0 | 0 | 0 | 0 | 1 | 0 | 0 | 0 | 1 | 2 | 6 | 0 |
WP: Red Ruffing (1–0) LP: Paul Derringer (0–1)

In the opener, starters Red Ruffing and Paul Derringer pitched complete games. The Reds struck first in the fourth inning when Ival Goodman walked with two outs and scored on Frank McCormick's single, but the Yankees tied the game in the fifth inning Joe Gordon singled and scored on Babe Dahlgren's double. In the bottom of the ninth inning with one out and the score tied 1–1, Charlie Keller tripled. The Reds walked Joe DiMaggio, but Bill Dickey ended it with a walk-off single to center.

=== Game 2 ===
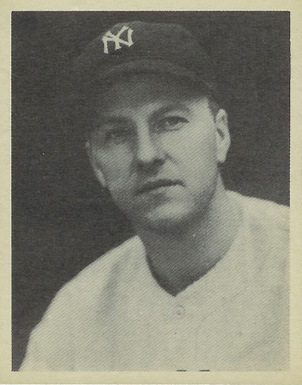
Monte Pearson

Thursday, October 5, 1939 1:30 pm (ET) at Yankee Stadium in Bronx, New York
| Team | 1 | 2 | 3 | 4 | 5 | 6 | 7 | 8 | 9 | R | H | E |
|---|---|---|---|---|---|---|---|---|---|---|---|---|
| Cincinnati | 0 | 0 | 0 | 0 | 0 | 0 | 0 | 0 | 0 | 0 | 2 | 0 |
| New York | 0 | 0 | 3 | 1 | 0 | 0 | 0 | 0 | X | 4 | 9 | 0 |
WP: Monte Pearson (1–0) LP: Bucky Walters (0–1); Home runs: CIN: None; NYY: Babe Dahlgren (1)

Lasting just 87 minutes, both pitchers threw complete games, Monte Pearson winning it with a two-hitter. In the bottom of the third inning Babe Dahlgren hit a leadoff double and scored on two groundouts. Red Rolfe then singled and scored on Charlie Keller's double. After another single, Bill Dickey's RBI single made it 3–0 Yankees. They added another run in the fourth inning on Dalgren's home run and took a 2–0 series lead heading to Cincinnati.

=== Game 3 ===
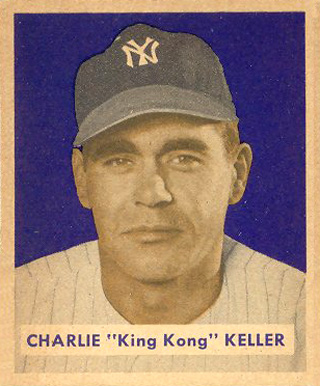
Charlie Keller

Saturday, October 7, 1939 1:30 pm (ET) at Crosley Field in Cincinnati, Ohio
| Team | 1 | 2 | 3 | 4 | 5 | 6 | 7 | 8 | 9 | R | H | E |
|---|---|---|---|---|---|---|---|---|---|---|---|---|
| New York | 2 | 0 | 2 | 0 | 3 | 0 | 0 | 0 | 0 | 7 | 5 | 1 |
| Cincinnati | 1 | 2 | 0 | 0 | 0 | 0 | 0 | 0 | 0 | 3 | 10 | 0 |
WP: Bump Hadley (1–0) LP: Junior Thompson (0–1); Home runs: NYY: Charlie Keller 2 (2), Joe DiMaggio (1), Bill Dickey (1); CIN: None

In Game 3, Charlie Keller's two-run home run the first off of Gene "Junior" Thompson put the Yankees up 2–0. In the bottom half, three consecutive two-out singles, the last an RBI one by Ernie Lombardi, cut the lead to 2–1. Yankees' starter Lefty Gomez left after that inning. In the second, Bump Hadley allowed four singles, the last two of which to Billy Werber and Ival Goodman scoring a run each, but in the third, Joe DiMaggio's two-run home run after a two-out walk to Keller put the Yankees back in front 4–3. They added to their lead in the fifth on Keller's two-run home run and Bill Dickey's home run to knock Thompson out of the game. Their 7–3 win left them one win away from the championship.

=== Game 4 ===
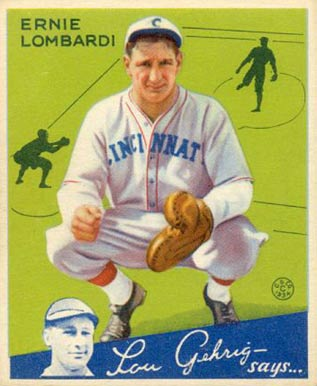
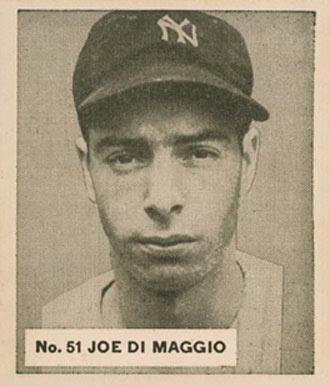
In the 10th inning, with the score tied and runners on first and third, Joe DiMaggio (right) singled. One run scored, then Reds outfielder Ival Goodman fumbled the ball. Charlie Keller beat the throw to catcher Ernie Lombardi (left) and inadvertently hit "The Schnozz" in his groin. Unfortunately for the Reds and Lombardi, he had failed to wear his protective cup and Lombardi was in pain and dazed. DiMaggio raced around the bases and scored while the ball was just a few feet away from the dazed Lombardi.

Sunday, October 8, 1939 1:30 pm (ET) at Crosley Field in Cincinnati, Ohio
| Team | 1 | 2 | 3 | 4 | 5 | 6 | 7 | 8 | 9 | 10 | R | H | E |
|---|---|---|---|---|---|---|---|---|---|---|---|---|---|
| New York | 0 | 0 | 0 | 0 | 0 | 0 | 2 | 0 | 2 | 3 | 7 | 7 | 1 |
| Cincinnati | 0 | 0 | 0 | 0 | 0 | 0 | 3 | 1 | 0 | 0 | 4 | 11 | 4 |
WP: Johnny Murphy (1–0) LP: Bucky Walters (0–2); Home runs: NYY: Charlie Keller (3), Bill Dickey (2); CIN: None

Neither side scored until the seventh. Home runs by Charlie Keller and Bill Dickey off of starter Paul Derringer put the Yankees on the board, but the Reds struck back in their half of the inning. With runners on second and third via an error and double off of reliever Steve Sundra, Wally Berger's RBI groundout put the Reds on the board, then after a walk, back-to-back RBI singles by Willard Hershberger and Billy Werber put the Reds up 3–2. They added another run next inning when Ival Goodman hit a leadoff double off of Johnny Murphy and scored on Ernie Lombardi's single, but in the ninth after two leadoff singles off of Bucky Walters, Dickey's fielder's choice aided by an error scored a run, then one out later, Joe Gordon's RBI single tied the game. Next inning, with two on via a walk and error, Joe DiMaggio drove them both in with a single and another error allowed DiMaggio himself to score to put the Yankees up 7–4. In the bottom half, Murphy allowed two leadoff singles, but retired the next three batters to end the game and series.

== Composite line score ==
1939 World Series (4–0): New York Yankees (A.L.) over Cincinnati Reds (N.L.)

| Team | 1 | 2 | 3 | 4 | 5 | 6 | 7 | 8 | 9 | 10 | R | H | E |
|---|---|---|---|---|---|---|---|---|---|---|---|---|---|
| New York Yankees | 2 | 0 | 5 | 1 | 4 | 0 | 2 | 0 | 3 | 3 | 20 | 27 | 2 |
| Cincinnati Reds | 1 | 2 | 0 | 1 | 0 | 0 | 3 | 1 | 0 | 0 | 8 | 27 | 4 |
Total attendance: 183,849 Average attendance: 45,962; Winning player's share: $5,542 Losing player's share: $4,193
