= Paul Derringer =

American baseball player (1906–1987)

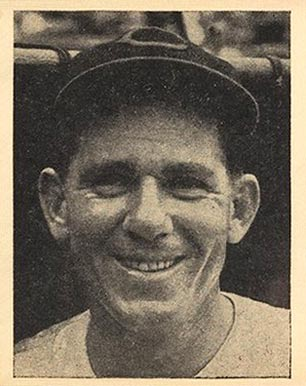
- Pitcher
- Born: October 17, 1906; Springfield, Kentucky, U.S.
- Died: November 17, 1987 (aged 81); Sarasota, Florida, U.S.
- Batted: Right Threw: Right

MLB debut
- April 16, 1931, for the St. Louis Cardinals

Last MLB appearance
- September 27, 1945, for the Chicago Cubs

MLB statistics
- Win–loss record: 223–212
- Earned run average: 3.46
- Strikeouts: 1,507
- Stats at Baseball Reference

Teams
- St. Louis Cardinals (1931–1933); Cincinnati Reds (1933–1942); Chicago Cubs (1943–1945)

Career highlights and awards
- 6× All-Star (1935, 1938–1942); 2× World Series champion (1931, 1940); Cincinnati Reds Hall of Fame

Samuel Paul Derringer (October 17, 1906 – November 17, 1987) was an American right-handed pitcher in Major League Baseball who played for three National League teams from 1931 to 1945, primarily the Cincinnati Reds.

He won 20 games for Cincinnati four times between 1935 and 1940, peaking with a 25–7 season in 1939 as the Reds won the NL pennant for the first time in 20 years. His 161 victories with Cincinnati are the club record for a right-hander, and rank second in franchise history to Eppa Rixey's 179; he also held the team record for career strikeouts when his career ended. His 579 games pitched ranked eighth in NL history when he retired, and his average of 1.88 walks per 9 innings pitched ranked behind only Christy Mathewson (1.59) and Grover Cleveland Alexander (1.65) among pitchers with 3000 innings in the NL since 1900.

== Early career ==
Derringer debuted with the St. Louis Cardinals in 1931, winning 18 games for the eventual World Series champions and leading the NL in winning percentage (.692); he had a streak of 33 consecutive scoreless innings in September. He finished third among pitchers in voting for The Sporting News Major League All-Star Team, gaining 56 votes (of a potential 229) and outpolling all other NL pitchers combined. Despite the team's victory, he suffered defeats in Games 1 and 5 of the World Series against the Philadelphia Athletics. He slumped to an 11–14 mark in 1932, and after beginning 1933 at 0–2 he was traded to the Reds in a six-player deal that brought Leo Durocher to the Cardinals. Despite a respectable 3.23 earned run average, he was 7–25 with Cincinnati that season, setting a team record for losses which still stands; his 27 overall losses led the NL, and came within two of Vic Willis' modern NL record, set in 1905. Derringer's record improved to 15–21 in 1934.

== Prime seasons ==
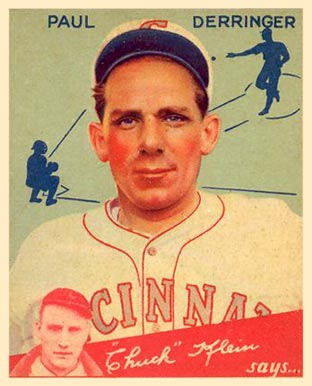
Baseball card of Derringer

In 1935 he was 22–13 for the 68–85 Reds, and was named to the All-Star team for the first of six times. On May 24 of that season, he started the first night game in major league history, beating the Philadelphia Phillies 2–1; President Franklin D. Roosevelt turned on the stadium lights from the White House. Seasons of 19–19 and 10–14 followed, on clubs which did not come close to contending, before he hit his peak from 1938 to 1940. In 1936 he set a team record with 51 appearances, breaking Rube Benton's 1912 mark of 50; his record was broken by Harry Gumbert, with 61 games in 1948.

In 1938 he was 21–14, and led the league in innings and complete games, as the Reds finished above .500 for the first time in ten years; he finished second in the NL in strikeouts (132) and third in ERA (2.93). His best season followed for the 1939 league champions as he was among the leaders in wins, ERA, strikeouts, innings and shutouts, and led the league with a .781 winning percentage – a new team record. He finished third in the MVP voting, won by teammate Bucky Walters. But in the World Series against the New York Yankees, he couldn't collect a victory as the Reds were swept; he lost a heartbreaking 2–1 decision in Game 1 when the Yankees scored in the ninth inning, and got no decision in the Reds' 10-inning loss in Game 4 after leaving in the seventh inning with a 3–2 lead.

In 1940 he was 20–12 with a 3.06 ERA and 115 strikeouts, and threw a pair of one-hitters, as Cincinnati repeated as NL champions; he finished fourth in the MVP voting, with first baseman Frank McCormick taking the trophy for the Reds for the third year in a row (Ernie Lombardi had won it in 1938). Derringer finally broke his run of bad breaks in the 1940 World Series against the Detroit Tigers; after losing Game 1 by a 7–2 score, he rebounded with complete game wins in Games 4 and 7. Walters contributed two other victories as the team won its second title, and first since 1919.

== Final years ==
Derringer slipped to marks of 12–14 and 10–11 in 1941 and 1942, though he was named to his fourth and fifth consecutive All-Star teams. In January 1943 his contract was sold to the Chicago Cubs, and he had seasons of 10–14 and 7–13 in 1943 and 1944 before having one last excellent campaign. In his final 1945 season, he was 16–11 as the Cubs won the NL pennant, and made three relief appearances in losses during the 1945 World Series against the Tigers. He ended his career with a record of 223–212, 1507 strikeouts and a 3.46 ERA, 251 complete games and 32 shutouts. His 1062 strikeouts with the Reds were the team record until broken in 1948 by Johnny Vander Meer, and remained the top mark by a right-hander until Jim Maloney surpassed him in 1966.

In 1958 Derringer was named a charter member of the Cincinnati Reds Hall of Fame. He died in Sarasota, Florida at age 81.

== See also ==
- List of Major League Baseball career wins leaders
