= Ival Goodman =

American baseball player (1908–1984)

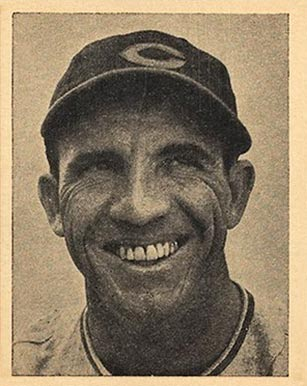
- Right fielder
- Born: July 23, 1908; Northview, Missouri, U.S.
- Died: November 25, 1984 (aged 76); Cincinnati, Ohio, U.S.
- Batted: Left Threw: Right

MLB debut
- April 16, 1935, for the Cincinnati Reds

Last MLB appearance
- August 23, 1944, for the Chicago Cubs

MLB statistics
- Batting average: .281
- Home runs: 95
- Runs batted in: 525
- Stats at Baseball Reference

Teams
- Cincinnati Reds (1935–1942); Chicago Cubs (1943–1944)

Career highlights and awards
- 2× All-Star (1938, 1939); World Series champion (1940); Cincinnati Reds Hall of Fame

Ival Richard Goodman (July 23, 1908 – November 25, 1984) was an American All-Star right fielder in Major League Baseball who played for the Cincinnati Reds (1935–1942) and Chicago Cubs (1943–1944). Goodman, who batted left-handed and threw right-handed, helped lead the Reds to a National League pennant in 1939 and a World Series title in 1940, and he was elected to the Cincinnati Reds Hall of Fame in 1959.

== Cincinnati Reds years ==
The Cincinnati Reds purchased Goodman from the St. Louis Cardinals on November 3, 1934, for $25,000. The decision paid immediate dividends. In his first season in the majors, Goodman appeared in 148 games, hitting .269 with 12 home runs and 72 runs batted in. Goodman also scored 86 runs and led the league with 18 triples. He led the league again the following season with 14 triples.

Goodman remained a fixture in the Reds lineup in the following years. In 1938 he set a since-broken Reds record with 30 home runs, which was second only to Mel Ott's 36 that season, while scoring 103 runs (fourth in the NL) and driving in 92 (eighth in the NL). He was named to the NL All-Star team that season.

In the Reds' pennant-winning 1939 season, Goodman hit a career-high .323 (sixth best in the NL) and was again named to the NL All-Star team. He also hit .333 in the World Series that year, but the Reds lost to the New York Yankees in an eventual four-game sweep.

The Reds rebounded in 1940, posting 100 wins for the first time in club history and winning their first World Series title since 1919, in what would be Goodman's final season as an everyday player. He hit .258 that year with 12 home runs and 78 runs scored. He also drove in five runs in the World Series that season.

== Chicago Cubs years ==
Goodman appeared in just 42 games in 1941 and 87 games in 1942, and on November 14, 1942, the Chicago Cubs purchased him from the Reds. He hit .320 in 80 games for the Cubs in 1943, but appeared in just 62 games the following season, which would be his last in the majors.

Goodman died on November 25, 1984, in Cincinnati, Ohio.

== League leader ==
- Triples: 1935 (18) and 1936 (14)
- Hit by pitch: 1936 (9), 1938 (15) and 1939 (7)

== Honors and awards ==
- NL All-Star: 1938 and 1939
- Cincinnati Reds Hall of Fame Inductee: 1959

== Career statistics ==
Years	Games	PA	AB	R	H	2B	3B	HR	RBI	SB	BB	SO	AVG	OBP	SLG	FLD%
10	1107	4441	3928	609	1104	188	85	95	525	49	382	380	.281	.352	.445	.975

In the 1939 and 1940 World Series, Goodman posted a .295 batting average (13-for-44) with 8 runs scored and 6 RBI.

== See also ==
- List of Major League Baseball annual triples leaders
