= Bucky Walters =

American baseball player and manager (1909–1991)

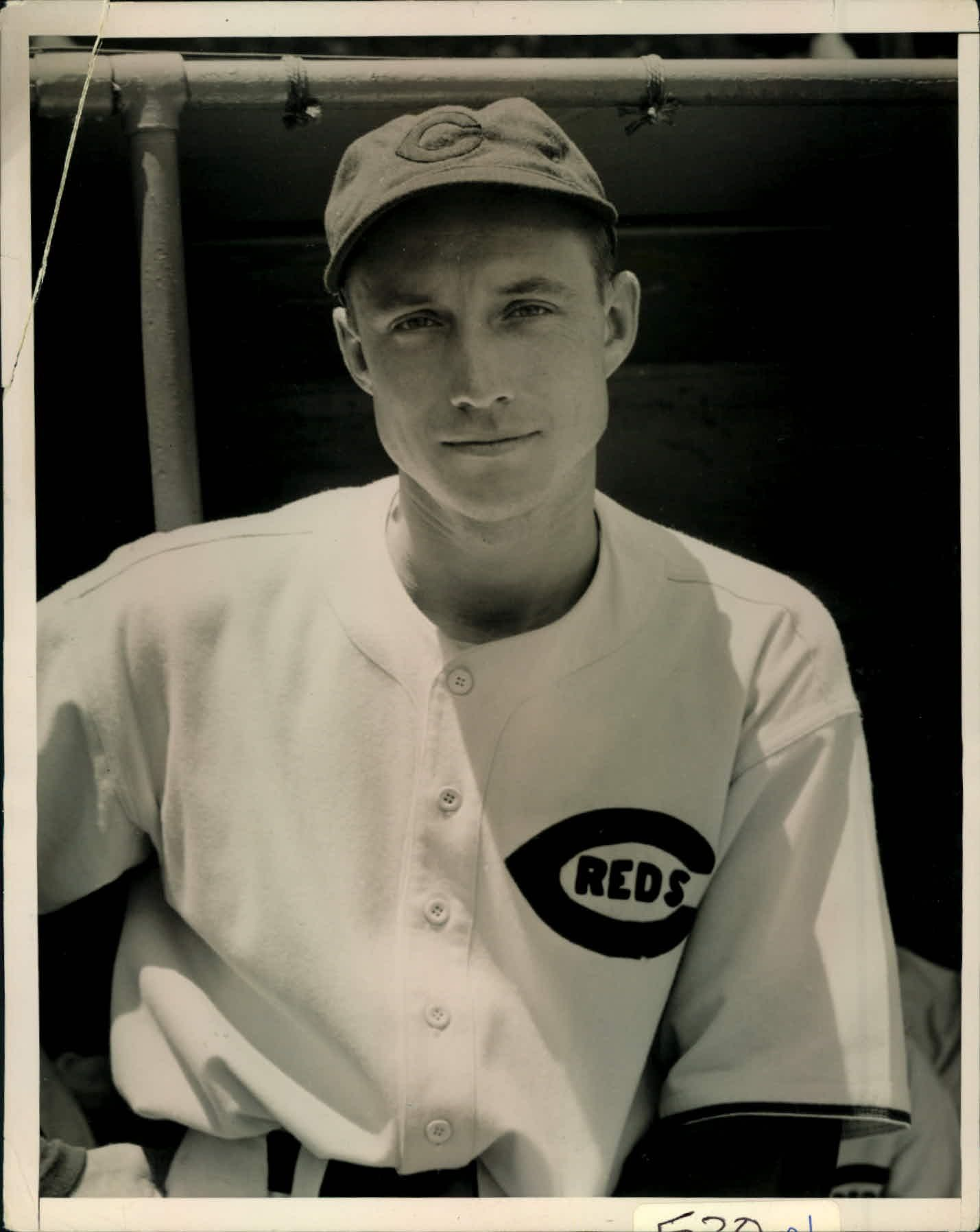
- Walters with the Cincinnati Reds in the 1940s
- Pitcher / Third baseman / Manager
- Born: April 19, 1909; Philadelphia, Pennsylvania, U.S.
- Died: April 20, 1991 (aged 82); Abington Township, Pennsylvania, U.S.
- Batted: Right Threw: Right

MLB debut
- September 17, 1931, for the Boston Braves

Last MLB appearance
- July 23, 1950, for the Boston Braves

MLB statistics
- Win–loss record: 198–160
- Earned run average: 3.30
- Strikeouts: 1,107
- Batting average: .243
- Home runs: 23
- Runs batted in: 234
- Stats at Baseball Reference
- Managerial record at Baseball Reference

Teams
- As player: Boston Braves (1931–1932); Boston Red Sox (1933–1934); Philadelphia Phillies (1934–1938); Cincinnati Reds (1938–1948); Boston Braves (1950); As manager: Cincinnati Reds (1948–1949)

Career highlights and awards
- 6× All-Star (1937, 1939–1942, 1944); World Series champion (1940); NL MVP (1939); Triple Crown (1939); 3× NL wins leader (1939, 1940, 1944); 2× MLB ERA leader (1939, 1940); NL strikeout leader (1939); Cincinnati Reds Hall of Fame

William Henry "Bucky" Walters (April 19, 1909 – April 20, 1991) was an American professional baseball pitcher and third baseman who played in Major League Baseball from 1931 to 1950. As a pitcher, he was a six-time All-Star and the 1939 National League Most Valuable Player.

Walters began his MLB career as a position player, and appeared in 184 games (177 started) as a third baseman before he converted to full-time pitcher. Over the course of his 19-year big-league career, he played for the Boston Braves (1931–1932, 1950), Boston Red Sox (1933–1934), Philadelphia Phillies (1934–1938) and Cincinnati Reds (1938–1948). Walters later became a major league manager and pitching coach. He was born in Philadelphia, batted and threw right-handed, stood 6 feet 1 inch (1.85 m) tall and weighed 180 pounds (82 kg).

== Playing career ==
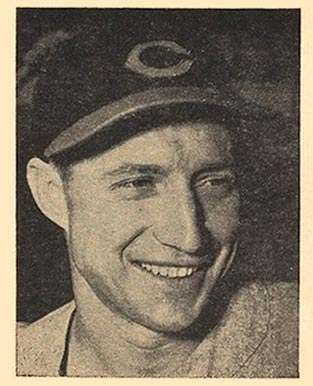
Walters in 1940

In his 16-season MLB pitching career, Walters posted a 198–160 won–lost record with 1,107 strikeouts and a 3.30 ERA in 3,1042/3 innings and 428 appearances. He allowed 2,990 hits and 1,121 bases on balls, and posted a 1.34 WHIP. Walters threw 242 complete games and 42 shutouts during his career, and was 160–107 (2.93) in 312 games as a member of the Reds.

Walters broke into the majors as a third baseman for the Boston Braves in 1931. After two seasons, he failed with the Braves (hitting only .191 in 32 total games). But in 1933, he hit .376 in the Pacific Coast League to earn a shot with the Boston Red Sox of the American League, where he batted .244 with eight home runs in 75 games between July 19, 1933, and May 18, 1934.

It was not until Walters was purchased by the Philadelphia Phillies from the Red Sox on June 14, 1934—and he was 25 years old—that he converted to pitching. After getting into 83 games as an infielder (80 at third base) for the Phils, he made his mound debut September 24 by tossing two innings of hitless relief against the Brooklyn Dodgers. He got his first MLB start six days later against the Braves, and allowed one unearned run in five innings. Then, in 1935, Walters pitched in 24 games, with 22 starts, and notched nine victories. He became a sinker-ball specialist, and after winning 14 games (for a Phillies team that won only 61 contests all year) and leading the National League with 34 starts in 1937, he was traded to the Cincinnati Reds on June 13, 1938.

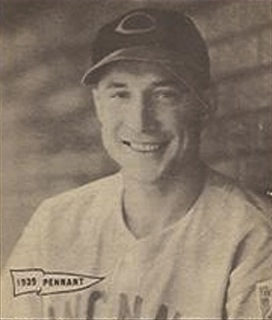
Walters 1940 baseball card

In 1939 and 1940, Walters helped the Reds win two straight National League pennants, in each season leading NL pitchers in wins, ERA, complete games and innings pitched. His most productive season came in 1939, when he won the Triple Crown with 27 victories, a 2.29 ERA, and 137 strikeouts (tied with Claude Passeau). For his performance, Walters garnered Most Valuable Player honors, the second of three straight Cincinnati players to win the award (Ernie Lombardi and Frank McCormick were the others). In 1940, Walters won 22 games and posted a 2.48 ERA.

When the Yankees swept the Reds in four games In the 1939 World Series, Walters started and lost Game 2 and was the loser in relief of the final game. Nevertheless, in the 1940 Series, facing Detroit, Walters gave the National League its first Series game victory since 1937 with a three-hitter in Game 2. Four days later, he evened the Series for the Reds in Game 6 with a five-hit shutout. He also became the first pitcher in 14 years to hit a home run in the Series. In Game 7, the Reds won the second world championship of their modern (post-1900) history.

In 1944, Walters posted a league-high 23 wins while losing only 8 and compiled a 2.40 ERA.

An excellent hitting pitcher in his major league career, Walters posted a .243 batting average (477-for-1966) with 227 runs, 23 home runs and 234 RBI. Like fellow pitcher Wes Ferrell, Walters was occasionally used as a pinch hitter during the 1940s.

== Manager and coach ==
He was named manager of the Reds on August 6, 1948, his last year as active player for Cincinnati, taking over from Johnny Neun. At the time, the club was 44–56 (.440) and seventh in the eight-team National League. Walters led the Reds to a 20–33 (.377) mark, still in seventh place but only one-half game from the league cellar. Retained for 1949, his Reds were 61–90 (.404) on September 27, again lodged in seventh place and 341/2 games out of first, when Walters was replaced by Luke Sewell at the club's helm. As a manager, he had an 81–123 (.397) record.

He briefly returned to pitching in 1950, and made a four-inning relief appearance with the Braves, for whom he was the full-time pitching coach.

Walters coached for the Braves (in Boston from 1950–1952, and in Milwaukee from 1953–1955) and New York Giants (1956–1957). He took a leave of absence from his Boston Braves' coaching tenure on June 6, 1952, to serve as the interim manager of the last minor league edition of the Milwaukee Brewers through the end of that season. The 1952 Brewers won 101 regular-season games, but fell in the finals of the American Association playoffs. Walters then was reappointed the Braves' pitching coach for 1953, with the franchise transferring to Milwaukee during spring training on March 18.

He was inducted into the Cincinnati Reds Hall of Fame in 1958.

Bucky Walters died in Abington, Pennsylvania, one day after his 82nd birthday.

In August 2008, he was named as one of the ten former players that began their careers before 1943 to be considered by the Veterans Committee for induction into the National Baseball Hall of Fame in 2009.

== See also ==
- Major League Baseball Triple Crown
- List of Major League Baseball annual ERA leaders
- List of Major League Baseball annual strikeout leaders
- List of Major League Baseball annual wins leaders
- List of Major League Baseball annual wins leaders
- List of Major League Baseball player-managers

Sporting positions
Preceded by Si Johnson	Boston/Milwaukee Braves pitching coach 1950–June 6, 1952; 1953–1955	Succeeded by Charlie Root
Preceded by Frank Shellenback	New York Giants pitching coach 1956–1957	Succeeded by n/a
Preceded by Red Smith	Milwaukee Brewers (AA) manager 1952; June 6–September 21	Succeeded by Franchise transferred
