= Ernie Lombardi =

American baseball player (1908–1977)

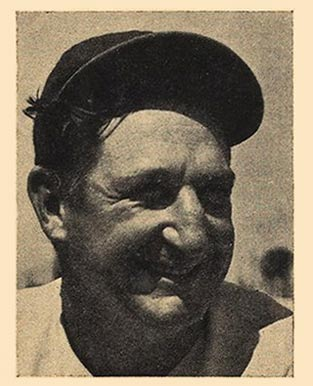
- Catcher
- Born: April 6, 1908; Oakland, California, U.S.
- Died: September 26, 1977 (aged 69); Santa Cruz, California, U.S.
- Batted: Right Threw: Right

MLB debut
- April 15, 1931, for the Brooklyn Robins

Last MLB appearance
- September 17, 1947, for the New York Giants

MLB statistics
- Batting average: .306
- Home runs: 190
- Runs batted in: 990
- Stats at Baseball Reference

Teams
- Brooklyn Robins (1931); Cincinnati Reds (1932–1941); Boston Braves (1942); New York Giants (1943–1947)

Career highlights and awards
- 8× All-Star (1936–1940, 1942, 1943, 1945); World Series champion (1940); NL MVP (1938); 2× NL batting champion (1938, 1942); Cincinnati Reds Hall of Fame

Member of the National

Baseball Hall of Fame
- Induction: 1986
- Election method: Veterans Committee

Ernesto Natali Lombardi (April 6, 1908 – September 26, 1977) was an American professional baseball player. He played in Major League Baseball (MLB) as a catcher for the Brooklyn Robins, Cincinnati Reds, Boston Braves, and New York Giants during a career that spanned 17 years, from 1931 through 1947. He had several nicknames, including "Schnozz", "Lumbago", "Bocci", "the Cyrano of the Iron Mask", and "Lom". He was inducted into the National Baseball Hall of Fame in 1986.

Baseball writer Bill James called Lombardi "the slowest man to ever play major league baseball well." Lombardi was an All-Star for seven seasons, (Note: MLB cancelled the 1945 All-Star Game and did not name All-Stars that season.) he hit over .300 for ten seasons and finished his major league career with a .306 batting average despite infields playing very deep for the sloth-like baserunner. He is listed at 6'3" and 230 lbs, but he probably approached 300 lbs towards the end of his career. He was also known as a gentle giant, and this made him hugely popular among Cincinnati fans.

== Early life ==
Lombardi was born and raised in Oakland, California. He attended McClymonds High School, the same school from which baseball star Frank Robinson and basketball star Bill Russell later graduated.

== Baseball career ==
=== Minor League ===
Lombardi started his professional baseball career for his hometown Oakland Oaks of the Pacific Coast League. He hit over .350 with power in 1929 and 1930 and had a strong arm. His talents were soon noticed by the Brooklyn Robins, who purchased his contract for $50,000.

=== Major league ===
Lombardi played his rookie season for the Robins in 1931 and hit .297. However, Brooklyn had too many quality catchers at the time and Robins' manager Wilbert Robinson contemplated using the strong-armed Lombardi as a pitcher. Instead, he was traded to the Cincinnati Reds shortly before the start of spring training for the 1932 season. Lombardi flourished in his first year for Cincinnati, batting .303 with 11 home runs and 68 runs batted in. In 1935, he hit .343, but was not selected as an All-Star until 1936, when he hit .333 that season. In 1937, he hit .334 and made the All-Star team. In 1938, he was selected as an All-Star again, and hit a league-leading .342 with 19 home runs, drove in 95 runs, and won the National League (NL) Most Valuable Player Award. Lombardi became one of the Reds' most productive and popular players. He was the catcher for left-hander Johnny Vander Meer's back-to-back no-hitters, accomplished on June 11 and June 15, 1938. He was again an All-Star the next two seasons, and his hitting skills and leadership helped the Reds to the National League pennant in 1939 and 1940, and the World Series title in 1940.

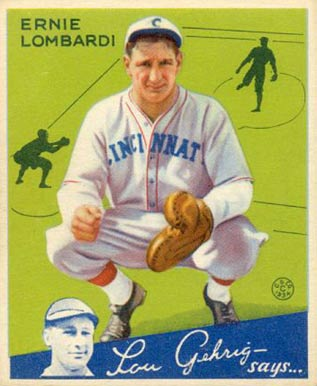
Baseball card of Lombardi

While Lombardi played for the Reds as the starting catcher, three-year teammate and backup catcher Willard Hershberger became the only major league player to commit suicide during a season. Hershberger, who thought he had been having difficulties playing as a replacement for an injured Lombardi for a few games in 1940, told manager Bill McKechnie in private that "my father killed himself, and I'm going to do it, too!" After failing to appear at the stadium the next day, the Reds checked Hershberger's room at the hotel on August 3 to find that he had slit his throat and wrist.

In 1942, the Boston Braves (NL team) purchased Lombardi's contract, and he became an All-Star and led the NL and Braves that season with a .330 batting average (albeit, in only 309 at-bats); the next batting title to be won by a catcher came more than 60 years later when Joe Mauer won the AL batting title in 2006. As of 2017, Lombardi remains only one of three NL catchers to win a batting title (the others are Cincinnati Reds catcher Bubbles Hargrove in 1926 and SF Giants catcher Buster Posey in 2012). His final All-Star selection was during the 1943 season (MLB cancelled the 1945 All-Star Game and no All-Stars were named that season), by which time Boston had traded him to the New York Giants. He enjoyed three productive if unspectacular seasons with the Giants before seeing his playing time diminish over the next two seasons. Lombardi retired after the 1947 season, having compiled a .306 career batting average, 1,792 hits, 277 doubles, 27 triples, 190 home runs, 990 RBI, 601 runs and 430 walks.

Lombardi, who is measured 6 feet 3 inches and weighed 230 pounds, had limited running speed. During his Major League career, he recorded 261 grounded-into double plays. Aside from being the leader in grounding into double plays during four seasons, he also holds the MLB record for grounding into a double play once in every 25.3 plate appearances. An opposing manager once jokingly said that Lombardi was so slow, he ran like he was carrying a piano and the man who was tuning it. Defenses would often position all four infielders in the outfield when Lombardi came to the plate. Despite this, he became an outstanding catcher on the basis of his strong, accurate arm and his ability to "call" a game.

Lombardi began the 1948 season with the Sacramento Solons. In May 1948, Sacramento sold Lombardi back to the Oakland Oaks.

== "Lombardi's Big Snooze" ==
During the fourth game of the 1939 World Series, in the 10th inning, with the score tied and runners on first and third, Joe DiMaggio singled. One run scored, then Reds outfielder Ival Goodman fumbled the ball. Yankees right fielder Charlie Keller, well known for his sturdy physique, beat the throw to catcher Lombardi and inadvertently hit "The Schnozz" in his groin. Unfortunately for the Reds and Lombardi, he had failed to wear his protective cup and Lombardi was in pain and dazed. DiMaggio raced around the bases and scored while the ball was just a few feet away from the afflicted Lombardi. The press was hugely critical of the sensitive catcher because of this and it came to be known as "Lombardi's Big Snooze". Bill James, in his Historical Baseball Abstract, says that "Lombardi was now the Bill Buckner of the 1930s, even more innocent than Buckner, and Buckner has plenty of people who should be holding up their hands to share his disgrace." James called Lombardi's selection as the Series goat "absurd." James noted the Yankees were already ahead three games to none and that DiMaggio's run merely made the final score 7–4 instead of 6–4.

== Later life ==
In 1953, Lombardi had been battling depression and agreed to go to a sanatorium. While on his way to the facility, Lombardi slit his throat from ear to ear with a razor. He received blood transfusions and was initially listed in critical condition, but within a couple of days newspaper reports said that he would survive. Lombardi worked as an attendant in the Candlestick Park press office and later as a gas station attendant in Oakland, California. Lombardi was inducted into the Cincinnati Reds Hall of Fame in 1958. He died on September 26, 1977 at a hospital in Santa Cruz, California and was buried at the Mountain View Cemetery in Oakland.

== Legacy ==
Lombardi's statue at Great American Ball Park

Lombardi was posthumously inducted into the Bay Area Sports Hall of Fame in 1982 and the National Baseball Hall of Fame in 1986. In 1981, Lawrence Ritter and Donald Honig included him in their book The 100 Greatest Baseball Players of All Time. In 2004, The Cincinnati Reds dedicated a bronze statue of Lombardi at the entrance of Great American Ball Park. He was honored along with four other Crosley Field Era Reds: Joe Nuxhall, Ted Kluszewski, Frank Robinson, and Pete Rose. Lombardi's larger-than-life bronze statue by Tom Tsuchiya shows him in his 1930s catching stance.

The Cincinnati Chapter of the BBWAA annually award the Ernie Lombardi Award to the Reds' team MVP.

== See also ==
- List of Major League Baseball batting champions
- List of Major League Baseball single-game hits leaders
- Bay Area Sports Hall of Fame
