= Bill Dickey =

American baseball player and coach (1907–1993)

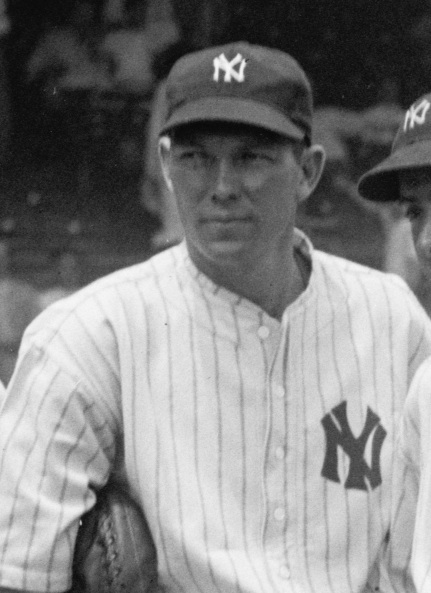
- Dickey with the New York Yankees in 1937
- Catcher / Manager
- Born: June 6, 1907; Bastrop, Louisiana, U.S.
- Died: November 12, 1993 (aged 86); Little Rock, Arkansas, U.S.
- Batted: Left Threw: Right

MLB debut
- August 15, 1928, for the New York Yankees

Last MLB appearance
- September 8, 1946, for the New York Yankees

MLB statistics
- Batting average: .313
- Home runs: 202
- Runs batted in: 1,209
- Managerial record: 57–48
- Winning %: .543
- Stats at Baseball Reference
- Managerial record at Baseball Reference

Teams
- As player: New York Yankees (1928–1943, 1946); As manager: New York Yankees (1946)

Career highlights and awards
- 11× All-Star (1933, 1934, 1936–1943, 1946); 7× World Series champion (1932, 1936–1939, 1941, 1943); New York Yankees No. 8 retired; Monument Park honoree

Member of the National

Baseball Hall of Fame
- Induction: 1954
- Vote: 80.2% (ninth ballot)

William Malcolm Dickey (June 6, 1907 – November 12, 1993) was an American professional baseball catcher and manager. He played in Major League Baseball with the New York Yankees for 17 seasons. Dickey managed the Yankees as a player-manager in 1946 in his last season as a player.

Dickey played with the Yankees from 1928 through 1943. After serving in the United States Navy during World War II, Dickey returned to the Yankees in 1946 as a player and manager. He retired after the 1946 season, but returned in 1949 as a coach, in which capacity he taught Yogi Berra the finer points of catching.

During Dickey's playing career, the Yankees went to the World Series nine times, winning eight championships. He was named to 11 All-Star Games. He went on to briefly manage the Yankees as a player-manager, then contribute to another six Yankee World Series titles as a coach. Dickey was elected to the Baseball Hall of Fame in 1954.

== Early life ==
Dickey was born in Bastrop, Louisiana, on June 6, 1907. He was one of seven children born to John and Laura Dickey. The Dickeys moved to Kensett, Arkansas, where John Dickey worked as a brakeman for the Missouri Pacific Railroad. John Dickey had played baseball for a semi-professional team based in Memphis, Tennessee. Bill's older brother, Gus, was a second baseman and pitcher in the East Arkansas Semipro League, while his younger brother, George, would go on to play in Major League Baseball (MLB) as a catcher.

Dickey attended Searcy High School in Searcy, Arkansas. At Searcy, Dickey played for the school's baseball team as a pitcher and second baseman.

== College career ==
Dickey enrolled at Little Rock College, where he played guard for the school's football team and pitcher for the baseball team. Dickey substituted for a friend on a semi-professional team based in Hot Springs, Arkansas as a catcher, impressing the team's manager with his throwing arm. Lena Blackburne, manager of the Little Rock Travelers, a minor league baseball team, noticed Dickey while scouting an outfielder on the Hot Springs team. Blackburne signed Dickey to play for his team.

== Minor league career ==
Dickey made his professional debut at the age of 18 with the Little Rock Travelers of the Class A Southern Association in 1925. Little Rock had a working agreement with the Chicago White Sox of the American League, which involved sending players between Little Rock, the Muskogee Athletics of the Class C Western Association, and the Jackson Senators of the Class D Cotton States League. Dickey played in three games for Little Rock in 1925, then was assigned to Muskogee in 1926, where he had a .283 batting average in 61 games.

Dickey returned to Little Rock, and batted .391 in 17 games at the end of the season. Dickey played in 101 games for Jackson in 1927, batting .297 with three home runs. As a fielder, Dickey compiled a .989 fielding percentage and was credited with 84 assists while he committed only nine errors.

== New York Yankees ==
Jackson waived Dickey after the 1927 season. Johnny Nee, a scout for the New York Yankees, wired his boss, Ed Barrow, the Yankees' general manager, that the Yankees should claim him. The Yankees purchased Dickey from Jackson for $12,500 ($234,375 in current dollar terms). Though he suffered from influenza during spring training in 1928, Dickey impressed Yankees manager Miller Huggins. Dickey hit .300 in 60 games for Little Rock, receiving a promotion to the Buffalo Bisons of the Class AA International League. After appearing in three games for Buffalo, Dickey made his MLB debut with the Yankees on August 15, 1928. He recorded his first hit, a triple off George Blaeholder of the St. Louis Browns, on August 24.

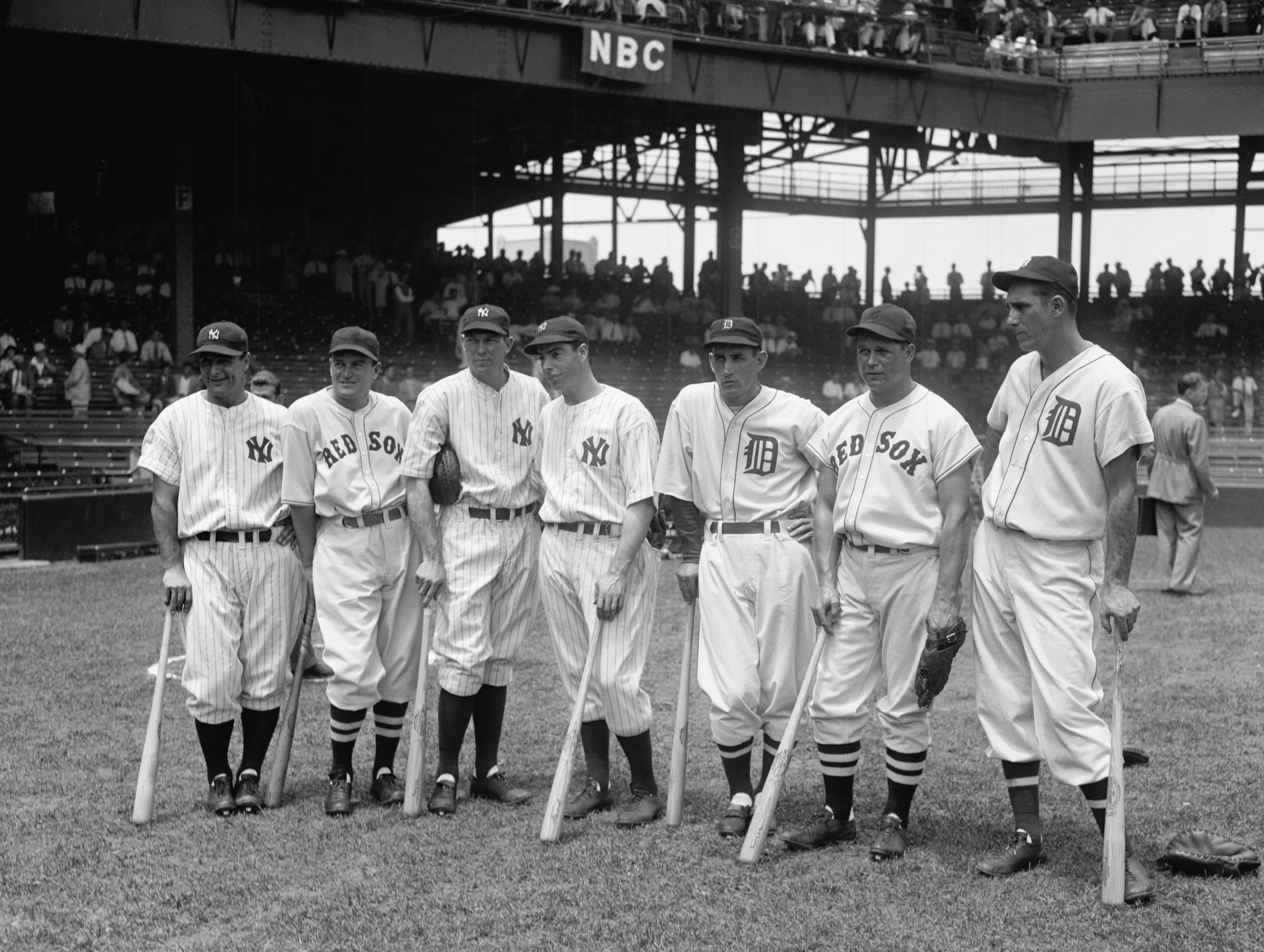
Seven of the American League's 1937 All-Star players, from left to right Lou Gehrig, Joe Cronin, Bill Dickey, Joe DiMaggio, Charlie Gehringer, Jimmie Foxx, and Hank Greenberg. All seven would eventually be elected to the Hall of Fame.

Dickey played his first full season in MLB in 1929. He replaced Benny Bengough as the Yankees' starting catcher, as Bengough experienced a recurrent shoulder injury, and Dickey outperformed Bengough and Johnny Grabowski. As a rookie, Dickey hit .324 with 10 home runs and 65 runs batted in (RBI). He led all catchers with 95 assists and 13 double plays. In 1930, Dickey hit .339. In 1931, Dickey made only three errors and batted .327 with 78 RBI. That year, he was named by The Sporting News to its All-Star Team.

Although his offensive production was overshadowed by Yankee greats Babe Ruth, Lou Gehrig and Joe DiMaggio, Dickey posted some of the finest offensive seasons ever by a catcher during the late 1930s, hitting over 20 home runs with 100 RBI in four consecutive seasons from 1936 through 1939. His 1936 batting average of .362 was the highest single-season average ever recorded by a catcher, tied by Mike Piazza of the Los Angeles Dodgers in 1997, until Joe Mauer of the Minnesota Twins hit .365 in 2009.

In 1932, Dickey broke the jaw of Carl Reynolds with one punch in a game after they collided at home plate, and received a 30-day suspension and $1,000 fine as punishment. That year, he hit .310, with 15 home runs and 84 RBI. In the 1932 World Series, he batted 7-for-16, with three walks, 4 RBI, and scored two runs.

In 1936, Dickey hit .362, finishing third in the AL behind Luke Appling (.388) and Earl Averill (.378). Dickey held out for an increase from his $14,500 salary in 1936, seeking a $25,000 salary. He ended the holdout by agreeing to a contract worth $17,500. Dickey earned $18,000 in 1939. Dickey signed a contract for 1940, receiving a $20,500 salary.

On July 26, 1939, Dickey hit three home runs against the St. Louis Browns in a 14-1 rout at Yankee Stadium.

The 1941 season marked Dickey's thirteenth year in which he caught at least 100 games, an MLB record. He also set a double play record and led AL catchers with a .994 fielding percentage.

Dickey suffered a shoulder injury in 1942, ending his streak of catching at least 100 games in a season. When Dickey's backup, Buddy Rosar, left the team without permission to take examinations to join the Buffalo police force and to be with his wife who was about to have a baby, Yankees manager Joe McCarthy signed Rollie Hemsley to be the second string catcher, relegating Rosar to the third string position. Dickey saw his playing time decrease with the addition of Hemsley. He returned for the 1942 World Series, but was considered to be fading.

Dickey had a terrific season in 1943, batting .351 in 85 games and hitting the title-clinching home run in the 1943 World Series. After the season, the 36 year-old Dickey was honored as the player of the year by the New York chapter of the Baseball Writers' Association of America.

== Manager and coach ==
Dickey was rumored to be a candidate for the managerial position with the Philadelphia Phillies after the 1943 season.

Dickey entered the United States Navy on March 15, 1944, as he was categorized in Class 1-A, meaning fit for service, by the Selective Service System. He served at the Navy Hospital Area in Hawaii. He was discharged in January 1946 as a lieutenant senior grade; one of his main tasks had been to organize recreational activities in the Pacific.

Returning to the Yankees in 1946, Dickey became the player-manager of the Yankees in the middle of the 1946 season after Joe McCarthy resigned. The Yankees did fairly well under Dickey's watch, going 57–48. However, owner Larry MacPhail refused to give Dickey a new contract until after the season. Rather than face the possibility of being a lame-duck manager, the 39 year-old Dickey resigned on September 12, but remained as a player. He retired after the season, having compiled 202 home runs, 1,209 RBIs and a .313 batting average over his career.

In 1947, Dickey managed the Little Rock Travelers. The team finished with a 51–103 record, last in the Southern Association. Dickey returned to the Yankees in 1949 as first base coach and catching instructor to aid Yogi Berra in playing the position. Already a good hitter, Berra became an excellent defensive catcher. With Berra having inherited his uniform number 8, Dickey wore number 33 until the 1960 season. Dickey later instructed Elston Howard on catching, when Berra moved to the outfield.

=== Managerial record ===
Team	Year	Regular season					Postseason			
Team	Year	Games	Won	Lost	Win %	Finish	Won	Lost	Win %	Result
NYY	1946	105	57	48	.543	resigned	–	–	–	–
Total		105	57	48	.543		0	0	–	

=== Career statistics ===
G	AB	R	H	2B	3B	HR	RBI	TB	BB	SO	AVG	OBP	SLG	OPS	FLD
1789	6300	930	1969	343	72	202	1209	3062	678	289	.313	.382	.486	.868	.988

In 38 World Series games, Dickey batted .255 (37-for-145) with 19 runs, 5 home runs, 24 RBI, and 15 walks.

Source:Baseball Reference

== Film career ==
While still an active player in 1942, Dickey appeared as himself in the film The Pride of the Yankees, which starred Gary Cooper as the Yankee captain and first baseman Lou Gehrig. Late in the movie, when Gehrig was fading due to the disease that would eventually take his life, a younger Yankee grumbled in the locker room, "the old man on first needs crutches to get around!"—and Dickey, following the script, belted the younger player, after which he said the kid "talked out of turn."

Dickey also appeared as himself in the film The Stratton Story in 1949. In the film, Dickey was scripted to take a called third strike from Jimmy Stewart's character. Dickey objected, stating "I never took a third strike. I always swung", and asking the director, Sam Wood, to allow him to swing through the third strike; Wood insisted that Dickey take the third strike. After many takes, Dickey commented: "I've struck out more times this morning than I did throughout my entire baseball career."

== Personal life ==
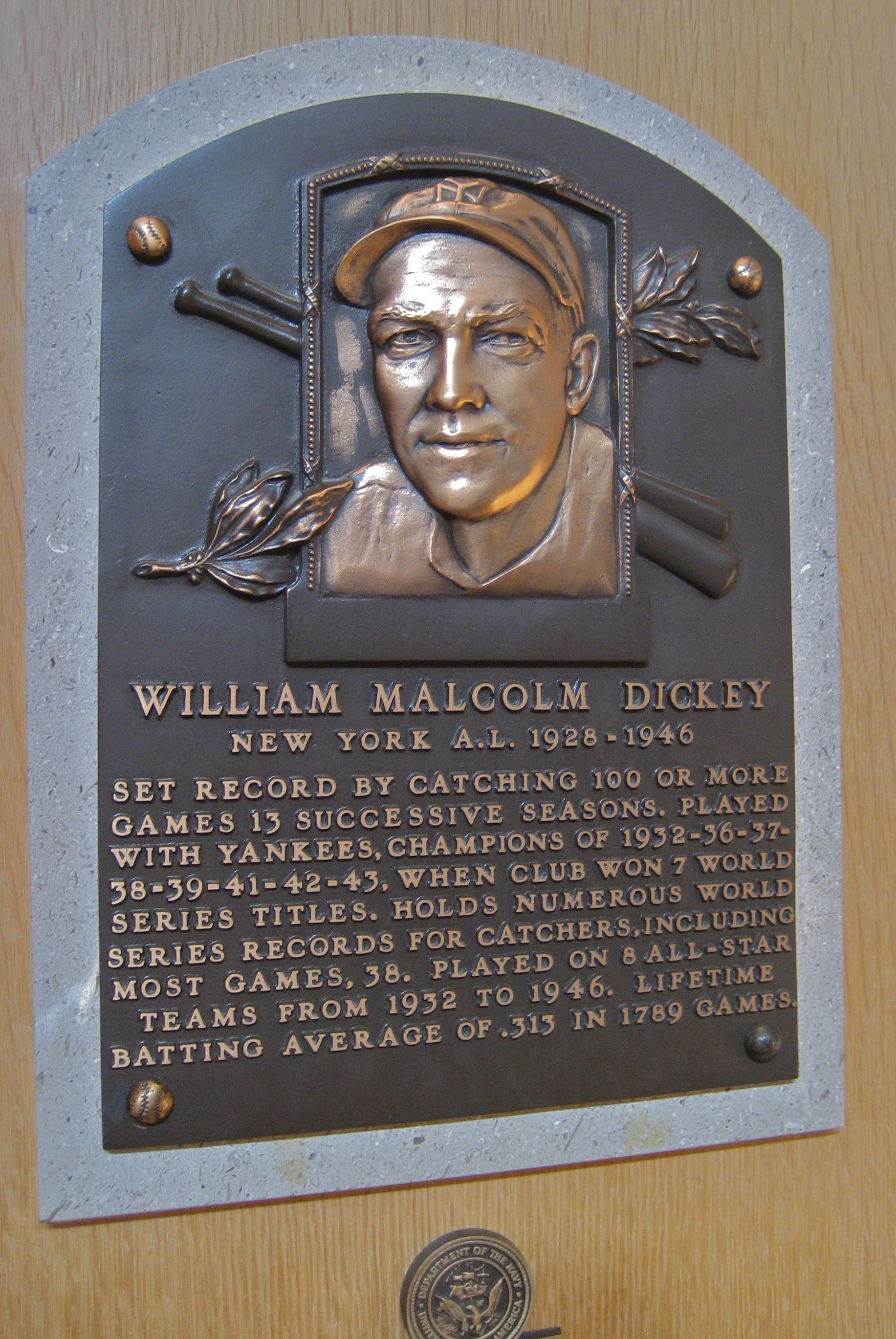
Bill Dickey's plaque in the Baseball Hall of Fame

On October 5, 1932, Dickey married Violet Arnold, a New York showgirl, at St. Mark's Church in Jackson Heights, New York. The couple had one child, Lorraine, born in 1935.

At the time of Lou Gehrig's death, Dickey described Gehrig as his best friend.

Dickey was an excellent quail hunter. He spent part of his retirement in the 1970s and 1980s residing in the Yarborough Landing community on the shore of Millwood Lake in southwestern Arkansas. He died in Little Rock, Arkansas, in 1993.

== Legacy ==
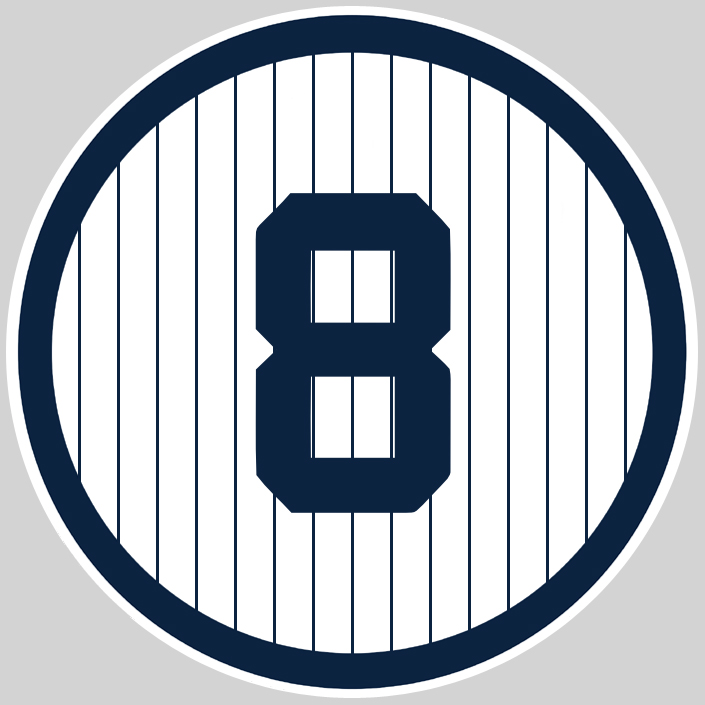
Bill Dickey's number 8 was retired by the New York Yankees in 1972.

Dickey was noted for his excellent hitting and his ability to handle pitchers. He was also known for his relentlessly competitive nature.

Dickey was inducted into the Hall of Fame in 1954. In 1972, the Yankees retired the number 8 in honor of Dickey and Berra. On August 22, 1988, the Yankees honored both Dickey and Berra by hanging plaques honoring them in Monument Park at Yankee Stadium. Dickey opined that Berra was "An elementary Yankee" who is "considered the greatest catcher of all time."

Dickey was named in 1999 to The Sporting News list of Baseball's Greatest Players, ranking number 57, trailing Johnny Bench (16), Josh Gibson (18), Yogi Berra (40), and Roy Campanella (50) among catchers. Like those catchers, Dickey was a nominee for the Major League Baseball All-Century Team, but the fan balloting chose Berra and Bench as the two catchers on the team.

In 2007, Dickey-Stephens Park opened in North Little Rock, Arkansas. The ballpark was named after Bill; his brother George; and two famous Arkansas businessmen, Jackson and Witt Stephens.

In 2013, the Bob Feller Act of Valor Award honored Dickey as one of 37 Baseball Hall of Fame members for his service in the United States Navy during World War II.

== See also ==
- List of Major League Baseball career runs batted in leaders
- List of Major League Baseball player-managers
- List of Major League Baseball players who spent their entire career with one franchise
