= 1941 Philadelphia Athletics season =

1941 Philadelphia Athletics
- League: American League
- Ballpark: Shibe Park
- City: Philadelphia
- Record: 64–90 (.416)
- League place: 8th
- Owners: Connie Mack
- Managers: Connie Mack
- Radio: WIP (By Saam, Stoney McLinn)

The 1941 Philadelphia Athletics season involved the A's finishing eighth in the American League with a record of 64 wins and 90 losses.

== Offseason ==
- November 16, 1940: George Caster was selected off waivers from the Athletics by the St. Louis Browns.
- Prior to 1941 season: Sam Zoldak was signed as a free agent by the Athletics.

== Regular season ==
=== Season standings ===
American League
| Team | W | L | Pct. | GB | Home | Road |
|---|---|---|---|---|---|---|
| New York Yankees | 101 | 53 | .656 | — | 51‍–‍26 | 50‍–‍27 |
| Boston Red Sox | 84 | 70 | .545 | 17 | 47‍–‍30 | 37‍–‍40 |
| Chicago White Sox | 77 | 77 | .500 | 24 | 38‍–‍39 | 39‍–‍38 |
| Cleveland Indians | 75 | 79 | .487 | 26 | 42‍–‍35 | 33‍–‍44 |
| Detroit Tigers | 75 | 79 | .487 | 26 | 43‍–‍34 | 32‍–‍45 |
| St. Louis Browns | 70 | 84 | .455 | 31 | 40‍–‍37 | 30‍–‍47 |
| Washington Senators | 70 | 84 | .455 | 31 | 40‍–‍37 | 30‍–‍47 |
| Philadelphia Athletics | 64 | 90 | .416 | 37 | 36‍–‍41 | 28‍–‍49 |

=== Record vs. opponents ===
1941 American League record Sources:
| Team | BOS | CWS | CLE | DET | NYY | PHA | SLB | WSH |
|---|---|---|---|---|---|---|---|---|
| Boston | — | 16–6 | 9–13 | 11–11 | 9–13–1 | 16–6 | 9–13 | 14–8 |
| Chicago | 6–16 | — | 17–5 | 12–10–1 | 8–14 | 10–12 | 11–11–1 | 13–9 |
| Cleveland | 13–9 | 5–17 | — | 10–12 | 7–15 | 15–7 | 13–9–1 | 12–10 |
| Detroit | 11–11 | 10–12–1 | 12–10 | — | 11–11 | 13–9 | 11–11 | 7–15 |
| New York | 13–9–1 | 14–8 | 15–7 | 11–11 | — | 14–8 | 18–4 | 16–6–1 |
| Philadelphia | 6–16 | 12–10 | 7–15 | 9–13 | 8–14 | — | 11–11 | 11–11 |
| St. Louis | 13–9 | 11–11–1 | 9–13–1 | 11–11 | 4–18 | 11–11 | — | 11–11–1 |
| Washington | 8–14 | 9–13 | 10–12 | 15–7 | 6–16–1 | 11–11 | 11–11–1 | — |

=== Roster ===
1941 Philadelphia Athletics
Roster
| Pitchers: 30 Johnny Babich; 25 Bill Beckmann; 20 Herman Besse; 23 Fred Caligiuri; 19 Chubby Dean; 34 Tom Ferrick; 42 Dick Fowler; 32 Bump Hadley; 18 Lum Harris; 15 Rankin Johnson; 16 Jack Knott; 21 Phil Marchildon; 29 Les McCrabb; 24 Nels Potter; 17 Buck Ross; 17 Tex Shirley; 24 Pat Tobin; 22 Porter Vaughan; 30 Roger Wolff | Catchers: 8 Frankie Hayes; 33 John Leovich; 9 Hal Wagner; Infielders: 10 Al Brancato; 11 Fred Chapman; 12 Crash Davis; 2 Benny McCoy; -- Don Richmond; 34 Al Rubeling; 5 Dick Siebert; 3 Pete Suder | Outfielders: 6 Sam Chapman; 14 Eddie Collins; 4 Bob Johnson; 19,32 Felix Mackiewicz; 7 Dee Miles; 1 Wally Moses; 28 Al Simmons; 38 Eric Tipton; 15 Elmer Valo; Other batters: 35 Ray Poole | Manager: Connie Mack; Coaches: 26 Earle Brucker; 31 Dave Keefe; 27 Earle Mack |

== Player stats ==
| = Indicates team leader |

=== Batting ===
==== Starters by position ====
Note: Pos = Position; G = Games played; AB = At bats; H = Hits; Avg. = Batting average; HR = Home runs; RBI = Runs batted in

| Pos | Player | G | AB | H | Avg. | HR | RBI |
|---|---|---|---|---|---|---|---|
| C | Frankie Hayes | 126 | 439 | 123 | .280 | 12 | 63 |
| 1B | Dick Siebert | 123 | 467 | 156 | .334 | 5 | 79 |
| 2B | Benny McCoy | 141 | 517 | 140 | .271 | 8 | 61 |
| SS | Al Brancato | 144 | 530 | 124 | .234 | 2 | 49 |
| 3B | Pete Suder | 139 | 531 | 130 | .245 | 4 | 52 |
| OF | Wally Moses | 116 | 438 | 132 | .301 | 4 | 35 |
| OF | Bob Johnson | 149 | 552 | 152 | .275 | 22 | 107 |
| OF | Sam Chapman | 143 | 552 | 178 | .322 | 25 | 106 |

==== Other batters ====
Note: G = Games played; AB = At bats; H = Hits; Avg. = Batting average; HR = Home runs; RBI = Runs batted in

| Player | G | AB | H | Avg. | HR | RBI |
|---|---|---|---|---|---|---|
| Eddie Collins | 80 | 219 | 53 | .242 | 0 | 12 |
| Dee Miles | 80 | 170 | 53 | .312 | 0 | 15 |
| Hal Wagner | 46 | 131 | 29 | .221 | 1 | 15 |
| Crash Davis | 39 | 105 | 23 | .219 | 0 | 8 |
| Fred Chapman | 35 | 69 | 11 | .159 | 0 | 4 |
| Elmer Valo | 15 | 50 | 21 | .420 | 2 | 6 |
| Don Richmond | 9 | 35 | 7 | .200 | 0 | 5 |
| Al Simmons | 9 | 24 | 3 | .125 | 0 | 1 |
| Al Rubeling | 6 | 19 | 5 | .263 | 0 | 2 |
| Felix Mackiewicz | 5 | 14 | 4 | .286 | 0 | 0 |
| Eric Tipton | 1 | 4 | 2 | .500 | 0 | 0 |
| John Leovich | 1 | 2 | 1 | .500 | 0 | 0 |
| Ray Poole | 2 | 2 | 0 | .000 | 0 | 0 |

=== Pitching ===
==== Starting pitchers ====
Note: G = Games pitched; IP = Innings pitched; W = Wins; L = Losses; ERA = Earned run average; SO = Strikeouts

| Player | G | IP | W | L | ERA | SO |
|---|---|---|---|---|---|---|
| Phil Marchildon | 30 | 204.1 | 10 | 15 | 3.57 | 74 |
| Jack Knott | 27 | 194.1 | 13 | 11 | 4.40 | 54 |
| Les McCrabb | 26 | 157.1 | 9 | 13 | 5.49 | 40 |
| Bill Beckmann | 22 | 130.0 | 5 | 9 | 4.57 | 28 |
| Johnny Babich | 16 | 78.1 | 2 | 7 | 6.09 | 19 |
| Fred Caligiuri | 5 | 43.0 | 2 | 2 | 2.93 | 7 |
| Dick Fowler | 4 | 24.0 | 1 | 2 | 3.38 | 8 |
| Roger Wolff | 2 | 17.0 | 0 | 2 | 3.18 | 2 |
| Buck Ross | 1 | 4.0 | 0 | 1 | 18.00 | 0 |

==== Other pitchers ====
Note: G = Games pitched; IP = Innings pitched; W = Wins; L = Losses; ERA = Earned run average; SO = Strikeouts

| Player | G | IP | W | L | ERA | SO |
|---|---|---|---|---|---|---|
| Lum Harris | 33 | 131.2 | 4 | 4 | 4.78 | 49 |
| Bump Hadley | 25 | 102.1 | 4 | 6 | 5.01 | 31 |
| Chubby Dean | 18 | 75.2 | 2 | 4 | 6.19 | 22 |
| Nels Potter | 10 | 23.1 | 1 | 1 | 9.26 | 7 |
| Porter Vaughan | 5 | 22.2 | 0 | 2 | 7.94 | 6 |
| Herman Besse | 6 | 19.2 | 2 | 0 | 10.07 | 8 |

==== Relief pitchers ====
Note: G = Games pitched; W = Wins; L = Losses; SV = Saves; ERA = Earned run average; SO = Strikeouts

| Player | G | W | L | SV | ERA | SO |
|---|---|---|---|---|---|---|
| Tom Ferrick | 36 | 8 | 10 | 7 | 3.77 | 30 |
| Rankin Johnson | 7 | 1 | 0 | 0 | 3.60 | 0 |
| Tex Shirley | 5 | 0 | 1 | 1 | 2.45 | 1 |
| Pat Tobin | 1 | 0 | 0 | 0 | 36.00 | 0 |

== Farm system ==
| Level | Team | League | Manager |
|---|---|---|---|
| AA | Toronto Maple Leafs | International League | Lena Blackburne |
| A | Williamsport Grays | Eastern League | Spencer Abbott |
| B | Wilmington Blue Rocks | Interstate League | Tom Oliver |
| C | Newport News Builders | Virginia League | Chief Bender |
| D | Federalsburg A's | Eastern Shore League | Joe O'Rourke |
