= 1939 Philadelphia Athletics season =

1939 Philadelphia Athletics
- League: American League
- Ballpark: Shibe Park
- City: Philadelphia
- Record: 55–97 (.362)
- League place: 7th
- Owners: Connie Mack
- Managers: Connie Mack
- Radio: WIP (By Saam, Stoney McLinn); WCAU (Bill Dyer)

The 1939 Philadelphia Athletics season involved the A's finishing seventh in the American League with a record of 55 wins and 97 losses.

== Offseason ==
- October 4, 1938: Bill Beckmann was drafted by the Athletics from the Atlanta Crackers in the 1938 rule 5 draft.

== Regular season ==
=== Season standings ===
American League
| Team | W | L | Pct. | GB | Home | Road |
|---|---|---|---|---|---|---|
| New York Yankees | 106 | 45 | .702 | — | 52‍–‍25 | 54‍–‍20 |
| Boston Red Sox | 89 | 62 | .589 | 17 | 42‍–‍32 | 47‍–‍30 |
| Cleveland Indians | 87 | 67 | .565 | 20½ | 44‍–‍33 | 43‍–‍34 |
| Chicago White Sox | 85 | 69 | .552 | 22½ | 50‍–‍27 | 35‍–‍42 |
| Detroit Tigers | 81 | 73 | .526 | 26½ | 42‍–‍35 | 39‍–‍38 |
| Washington Senators | 65 | 87 | .428 | 41½ | 37‍–‍39 | 28‍–‍48 |
| Philadelphia Athletics | 55 | 97 | .362 | 51½ | 28‍–‍48 | 27‍–‍49 |
| St. Louis Browns | 43 | 111 | .279 | 64½ | 18‍–‍59 | 25‍–‍52 |

=== Record vs. opponents ===
1939 American League record Sources:
| Team | BOS | CWS | CLE | DET | NYY | PHA | SLB | WSH |
|---|---|---|---|---|---|---|---|---|
| Boston | — | 8–14 | 11–11 | 10–12 | 11–8–1 | 18–4 | 16–6 | 15–7 |
| Chicago | 14–8 | — | 12–10 | 12–10 | 4–18 | 11–11 | 18–4 | 14–8–1 |
| Cleveland | 11–11 | 10–12 | — | 11–11 | 7–15 | 18–4 | 16–6 | 14–8 |
| Detroit | 12–10 | 10–12 | 11–11 | — | 9–13 | 11–11 | 14–8–1 | 14–8 |
| New York | 8–11–1 | 18–4 | 15–7 | 13–9 | — | 18–4 | 19–3 | 15–7 |
| Philadelphia | 4–18 | 11–11 | 4–18 | 11–11 | 4–18 | — | 13–9–1 | 8–12 |
| St. Louis | 6–16 | 4–18 | 6–16 | 8–14–1 | 3–19 | 9–13–1 | — | 7–15 |
| Washington | 7–15 | 8–14–1 | 8–14 | 8–14 | 7–15 | 12–8 | 15–7 | — |

=== Roster ===
1939 Philadelphia Athletics
Roster
| Pitchers: 35 Bill Beckmann; 16 George Caster; 19 Chubby Dean; 15 Bob Joyce; -- Walt Masters; 31 Les McCrabb; 22 Lynn Nelson; 20 Sam Page; 21 Roy Parmelee; 25 Cotton Pippen; 24 Nels Potter; 21 Jim Reninger; 17 Buck Ross; 21 Jim Schelle; 31 Dave Smith; 18 Eddie Smith; 20 Bud Thomas | Catchers: 9 Earle Brucker; 8 Frankie Hayes; 30,36 Harry O'Neill; 26 Hal Wagner; Infielders: 14 Wayne Ambler; 6 Al Brancato; 25 Fred Chapman; 36 Nick Etten; 12 Joe Gantenbein; 3 Bill Lillard; 7 Dario Lodigiani; 23 Bob McNamara; 34 Bill Nagel; 2 Skeeter Newsome; 5 Dick Siebert | Outfielders: 10 Sam Chapman; 26 Eddie Collins; 6 Lou Finney; 4 Bob Johnson; 11 Dee Miles; 1 Wally Moses; 18 Eric Tipton | Manager: Connie Mack; Coaches: 29 Charlie Berry; 28 Lena Blackburne; 32 Dave Keefe; 27 Earle Mack |

== Player stats ==
=== Batting ===
==== Starters by position ====
Note: Pos = Position; G = Games played; AB = At bats; H = Hits; Avg. = Batting average; HR = Home runs; RBI = Runs batted in

| Pos | Player | G | AB | H | Avg. | HR | RBI |
|---|---|---|---|---|---|---|---|
| C | Frankie Hayes | 124 | 431 | 122 | .283 | 20 | 83 |
| 1B | Dick Siebert | 101 | 402 | 118 | .294 | 6 | 47 |
| 2B | Joe Gantenbein | 111 | 348 | 101 | .290 | 4 | 36 |
| SS | Skeeter Newsome | 99 | 248 | 55 | .222 | 0 | 17 |
| 3B | Dario Lodigiani | 121 | 393 | 102 | .260 | 6 | 44 |
| OF | Wally Moses | 115 | 437 | 134 | .307 | 3 | 33 |
| OF | Bob Johnson | 150 | 544 | 184 | .338 | 23 | 114 |
| OF | Sam Chapman | 140 | 498 | 134 | .269 | 15 | 64 |

==== Other batters ====
Note: G = Games played; AB = At bats; H = Hits; Avg. = Batting average; HR = Home runs; RBI = Runs batted in

| Player | G | AB | H | Avg. | HR | RBI |
|---|---|---|---|---|---|---|
| Bill Nagel | 105 | 341 | 86 | .252 | 12 | 39 |
| Dee Miles | 106 | 320 | 96 | .300 | 1 | 37 |
| Wayne Ambler | 95 | 227 | 48 | .211 | 0 | 24 |
| Earle Brucker | 62 | 172 | 50 | .291 | 3 | 31 |
| Nick Etten | 43 | 155 | 39 | .252 | 3 | 29 |
| Eric Tipton | 47 | 104 | 24 | .231 | 1 | 14 |
| Al Brancato | 21 | 68 | 14 | .206 | 1 | 8 |
| Fred Chapman | 15 | 49 | 14 | .286 | 0 | 1 |
| Lou Finney | 9 | 22 | 3 | .136 | 0 | 1 |
| Eddie Collins | 32 | 21 | 5 | .238 | 0 | 0 |
| Bill Lillard | 7 | 19 | 6 | .316 | 0 | 1 |
| Bob McNamara | 9 | 9 | 2 | .222 | 0 | 3 |
| Hal Wagner | 5 | 8 | 1 | .125 | 0 | 0 |
| Harry O'Neill | 1 | 0 | 0 | ---- | 0 | 0 |

=== Pitching ===
==== Starting pitchers ====
Note: G = Games pitched; IP = Innings pitched; W = Wins; L = Losses; ERA = Earned run average; SO = Strikeouts

| Player | G | IP | W | L | ERA | SO |
|---|---|---|---|---|---|---|
| Lynn Nelson | 35 | 197.2 | 10 | 13 | 4.78 | 75 |
| Buck Ross | 29 | 174.0 | 6 | 14 | 6.00 | 43 |
| Bill Beckmann | 27 | 155.1 | 7 | 11 | 5.39 | 20 |
| Les McCrabb | 5 | 35.2 | 1 | 2 | 4.04 | 11 |
| Sam Page | 4 | 22.0 | 0 | 3 | 6.95 | 11 |
| Bud Thomas | 2 | 4.0 | 0 | 1 | 15.75 | 0 |

==== Other pitchers ====
Note: G = Games pitched; IP = Innings pitched; W = Wins; L = Losses; ERA = Earned run average; SO = Strikeouts

| Player | G | IP | W | L | ERA | SO |
|---|---|---|---|---|---|---|
| Nels Potter | 41 | 196.1 | 8 | 12 | 6.60 | 60 |
| George Caster | 28 | 136.0 | 9 | 9 | 4.90 | 59 |
| Cotton Pippen | 25 | 118.2 | 4 | 11 | 5.99 | 33 |
| Roy Parmelee | 14 | 44.2 | 1 | 6 | 4.45 | 13 |
| Jim Reninger | 4 | 16.1 | 0 | 2 | 7.71 | 3 |

==== Relief pitchers ====
Note: G = Games pitched; W = Wins; L = Losses; SV = Saves; ERA = Earned run average; SO = Strikeouts

| Player | G | W | L | SV | ERA | SO |
|---|---|---|---|---|---|---|
| Chubby Dean | 54 | 5 | 8 | 7 | 5.25 | 39 |
| Bob Joyce | 30 | 3 | 5 | 0 | 6.69 | 25 |
| Walt Masters | 4 | 0 | 0 | 0 | 6.55 | 2 |
| Eddie Smith | 3 | 1 | 0 | 0 | 9.82 | 3 |
| Bill Nagel | 1 | 0 | 0 | 0 | 12.00 | 0 |
| Jim Schelle | 1 | 0 | 0 | 0 | inf | 0 |
| Dave Smith | 1 | 0 | 0 | 0 | --- | 0 |

== Farm system ==
| Level | Team | League | Manager |
|---|---|---|---|
| A | Williamsport Grays | Eastern League | Marty McManus |
| D | Federalsburg Athletics | Eastern Shore League | Sammy Holbrook |
| D | Lexington Indians | North Carolina State League | Joe Byrd |
