= Lillard =

Lillard is a surname of French origin. Through Norman and Huguenot migration, it is found mostly in the British isles and their colonies. Notable people with the surname include:

- Bill Lillard (1918−2009), American baseball player
- Charles Lillard (1944−1997), American-Canadian poet and historian
- Damian Lillard (born 1990), American basketball player
- David Lillard (born c. 1953), Tennessee state treasurer
- Martha Lillard (1948-2026), American polio survivor, last person who still living in the iron lung
- Gene Lillard (1913−1991), American baseball player
- Joe Lillard (1905−1978), American football, baseball, and basketball player
- Justin D. Lillard (born 1986),

American businessman, Nashville Tn.

- Matthew Lillard (born 1970), American actor, director and producer
- W. H. Lillard (1881−1967), American football coach and educator
- William Harvey Lillard (1856−1925), American janitor, first chiropractic patient
