= Bob McNamara (baseball) =

American baseball player (1916-2011)

Philadelphia Athletics – No. 23, 3
- Third Baseman, Shortstop and First Baseman
- Born: September 19, 1916; Denver, Colorado
- Died: March 9, 2011 (aged 94); Rancho Bernardo, California
- Batted: Right Threw: Right

MLB debut
- May 27, 1939, for the Philadelphia Athletics

Last appearance
- September 20, 1939, for the Philadelphia Athletics

MLB statistics
- Batting average: .222
- Hits: 2
- Home runs: 0
- Runs batted in: 3
- Stats at Baseball Reference

Robert Maxey McNamara (September 19, 1916 – March 9, 2011) was an infielder in Major League Baseball, playing mainly at shortstop for the Philadelphia Athletics in the 1939 season. Listed at 5'10", 170 lb., He batted right-handed.

Born in Denver, Colorado, McNamara was one of many baseball players whose professional career was interrupted during World War II.

McNamara debuted with the Athletics of Connie Mack in 1939. In his first major league at-bat, against the New York Yankees, he drilled a single off Lefty Gomez at Yankee Stadium. Overall, he appeared in nine games, batting a .222 average (2-for-9) with one double and three runs batted in, including a walk and a strikeout with no home runs. He also played three minor league seasons, being managed by Rogers Hornsby and Pepper Martin, among others.

McNamara died in Rancho Bernardo, California, at the age of 94. At the time of his death he was recognized as the ninth oldest living major league player.

== See also ==
- 1939 Philadelphia Athletics season
