= Bob Joyce (baseball) =

American baseball player (1915-1981)

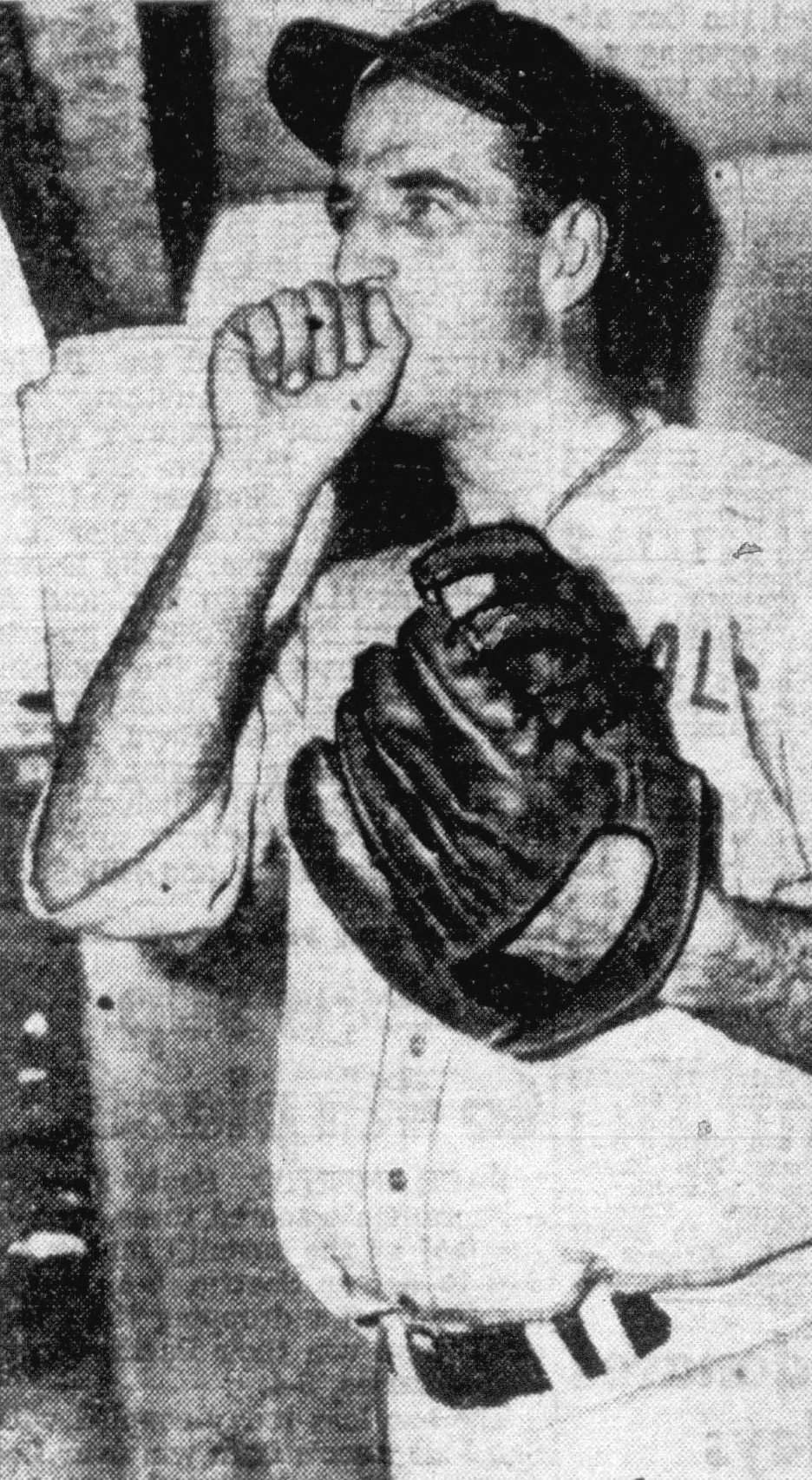
- Joyce, circa 1945
- Pitcher
- Born: January 14, 1915; Stockton, California, U.S.
- Died: December 10, 1981 (aged 66); San Francisco, California, U.S.
- Batted: Right Threw: Right

MLB debut
- May 4, 1939, for the Philadelphia Athletics

Last MLB appearance
- July 14, 1946, for the New York Giants

MLB statistics
- Win–loss record: 6–9
- Earned run average: 6.20
- Innings pitched: 168 1/3
- Stats at Baseball Reference

Teams
- Philadelphia Athletics (1939); New York Giants (1946)

Robert Emmett Joyce (January 14, 1915 – December 10, 1981) was an American professional baseball player, a right-handed pitcher who worked in 44 games in the Major Leagues for the Philadelphia Athletics (1939) and New York Giants (1946).

Born in Stockton, California, Joyce's professional career began in 1934. He was listed at 6 feet 1 inch (185 cm) tall and 180 pounds (82 kg). His professional career extended through 1949, with the exception of the 1937 baseball season. He won 172 games in minor league baseball, and was a stalwart member of the pitching staff of the San Francisco Seals of the Pacific Coast League during World War II, winning 22, 20 and 21 games from 1942 to 1944, and 31 games (against only 11 defeats) with a 2.17 earned run average in 1945. He was named the PCL's Most Valuable Player for 1945.

Joyce's Major League career consisted of 30 games for the 1939 Athletics and 14 for the 1946 Giants. He started 13 games and registered three complete games. All together he surrendered 235 hits and 57 bases on balls, with 49 strikeouts, in 168 1/3 Major League innings pitched.
