= Rankin Johnson =

Rankin Johnson may refer to:

- Rankin Johnson, Sr. (1888–1972), major league pitcher
- Rankin Johnson, Jr. (1917–2006), major league pitcher
