= Kellerman, Alabama =

- Unincorporated community
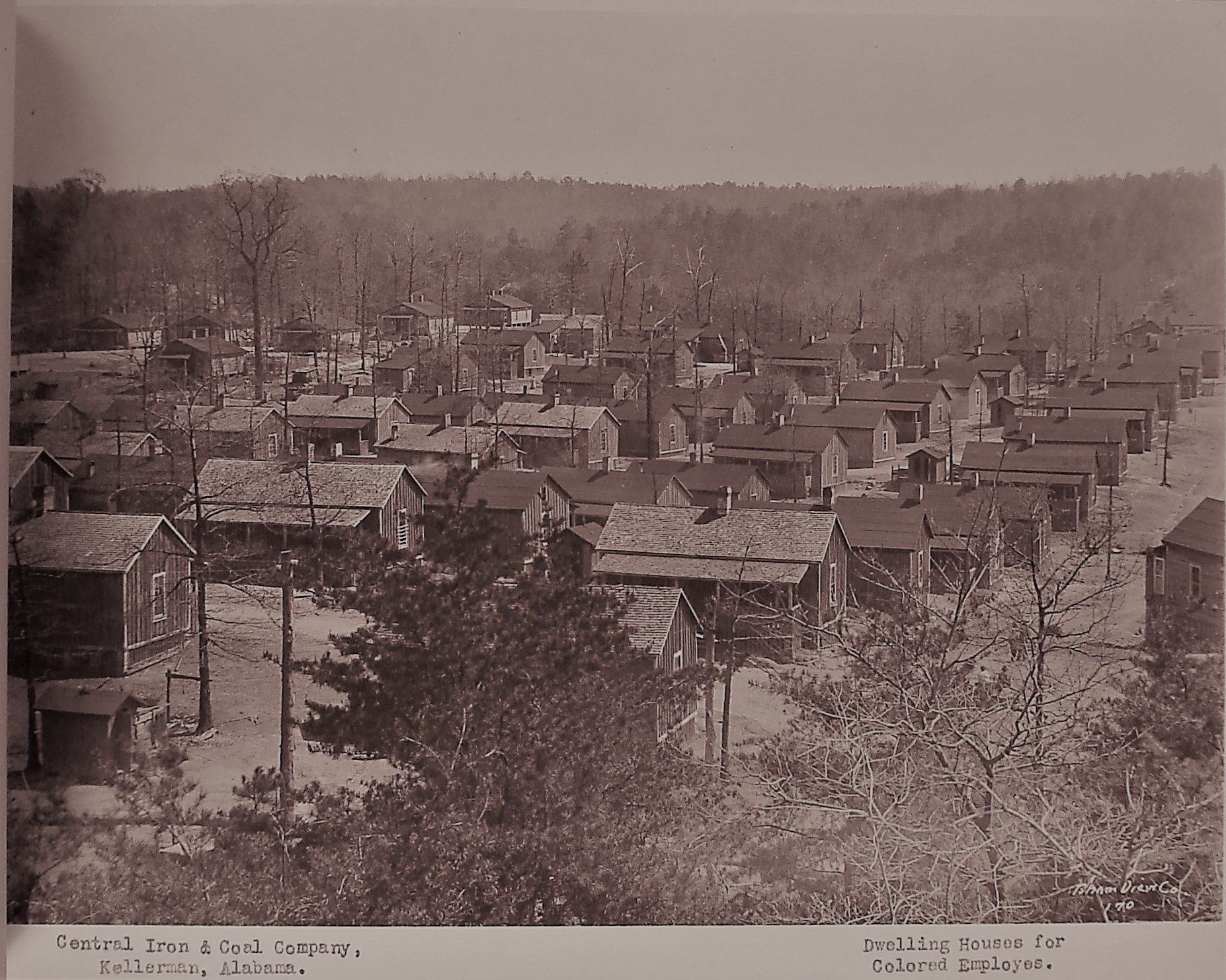
- Workers' housing at the Kellerman mines

- Location within Alabama Location within the United States
- Coordinates: 33°20′26″N 87°18′17″W
- Country: United States
- State: Alabama
- County: Tuscaloosa
- Elevation: 538 ft (164 m)
- Time zone: UTC-6 (Central (CST))
  - Summer (DST): UTC-5 (CDT)
- ZIP code: 35468
- Area codes: 205, 659
- GNIS feature ID: 121109

Kellerman is an unincorporated community in Tuscaloosa County, Alabama, United States, six miles (9.7 km) north of Brookwood. The community formed around a coal mining operation owned by the Central Iron & Coal Co. of New York. Kellerman was a company town, and the houses were owned by the company. When mining operations ceased in 1962, almost all of the nearly 5,000 residents eventually moved away leaving less than 10 houses remaining. The Kellerman post office with ZIP code 35468, which opened on August 6, 1902, is now located at the Alabama Mining Museum in Dora, Alabama Kellerman was most likely named for a civil engineer with the Kellerman Mine Company.

== Notable person ==
- Dee Miles, baseball player
