= Bill Lillard =

American baseball player (1918-2009)

- Shortstop
- Born: January 10, 1918; Goleta, California, U.S.
- Died: June 9, 2009 (aged 91); San Luis Obispo, California, U.S.
- Batted: Right Threw: Right

MLB debut
- September 11, 1939, for the Philadelphia Athletics

Last MLB appearance
- September 24, 1940, for the Philadelphia Athletics

MLB statistics
- Batting average: .244
- Home runs: 1
- Runs batted in: 22
- Stats at Baseball Reference

Teams
- Philadelphia Athletics (1939–1940)

William Beverly Lillard (January 10, 1918 – June 9, 2009) was an American professional baseball player. A shortstop, the native of Goleta, California, was listed at 5 feet 10 inches (1.78 m) tall and 170 pounds (77 kg) and threw and batted right-handed. His older brother, Gene, also played in the Majors.

Bill Lillard started his career in the minors in 1938 with the San Francisco Seals and after hitting .335 that season, moved up to Major League Baseball playing shortstop from 1939 through 1940 for the Philadelphia Athletics of the American League. In a two-season Major League career, Lillard was a .244 hitter (55-for-206) with one home run and 22 RBI in 80 games, including 30 runs, nine doubles, two triples, and a .339 on-base percentage.

Lillard then served in the Pacific Theater of Operations during World War II and was wounded by a mortar round for which he received the Purple Heart Medal.

He returned to baseball for his final seasons with the New York Giants' organization, batting .269 in 1946 for their American Association team in Minneapolis. He helped the Jersey City Giants win the International League pennant in 1947 while batting .264.

Lillard died in San Luis Obispo, California at the age of 91. he was interred at Santa Barbara Cemetery.

== See also ==
- 1939 Philadelphia Athletics season
- 1940 Philadelphia Athletics season
