= Bill Nagel =

American baseball player (1915–1981)

- Infielder
- Born: August 19, 1915; Memphis, Tennessee
- Died: October 8, 1981 (aged 66); Freehold Township, New Jersey
- Batted: Right Threw: Right

MLB debut
- April 20, 1939, for the Philadelphia Athletics

Last MLB appearance
- September 25, 1945, for the Chicago White Sox

MLB statistics
- Batting average: .227
- Home runs: 15
- Runs batted in: 72
- Stats at Baseball Reference

Teams
- Philadelphia Athletics (1939); Philadelphia Phillies (1941); Chicago White Sox (1945)

William Taylor Nagel (August 19, 1915 – October 8, 1981) was an infielder in Major League Baseball. He played for the Philadelphia Athletics, Philadelphia Phillies, and Chicago White Sox.
