= Sam Page (baseball) =

American baseball player

- Pitcher
- Born: February 11, 1916; Woodruff, South Carolina, U.S.
- Died: May 29, 2002 (aged 86); Greenville, South Carolina, U.S.
- Batted: Left Threw: Right

MLB debut
- September 11, 1939, for the Philadelphia Athletics

Last MLB appearance
- September 28, 1939, for the Philadelphia Athletics

MLB statistics
- Win–loss record: 0-3
- Earned run average: 6.95
- Strikeouts: 11
- Stats at Baseball Reference

Teams
- Philadelphia Athletics (1939)

Samuel Walter Page (February 11, 1916 – May 29, 2002) was an American Major League Baseball pitcher who played in 1939 with the Philadelphia Athletics. He batted left and threw right-handed.
