= John Leovich =

American baseball player (1918-2000)

- Leovich in 1940
- Catcher
- Born: May 5, 1918; Portland, Oregon, U.S.
- Died: February 3, 2000 (aged 81); Lincoln City, Oregon, U.S.
- Batted: Right Threw: Right

MLB debut
- May 1, 1941, for the Philadelphia Athletics

Last MLB appearance
- May 1, 1941, for the Philadelphia Athletics

MLB statistics
- Batting average: .500
- Hits: 1
- Doubles: 1
- Stats at Baseball Reference

Teams
- Philadelphia Athletics (1941)

John Joseph Leovich (May 5, 1918 – February 3, 2000) was an American professional baseball catcher who played in one Major League Baseball game, for the 1941 Philadelphia Athletics.

== Early life ==
Leovich was born in Portland, Oregon. He played college baseball and college football for Oregon State University, and was a letterman in football in 1939 and 1940, and in baseball in 1940.

In college, Leovich played in the first-ever Pineapple Bowl in 1940 against the University of Hawaii following the 1939 football season. He played as left end in the game, resulting in a 39-6 win.

Leovich was signed to a baseball contract by Connie Mack. This became an issue when athletic director Percy Locey claimed that the A's "stole" Leovich, which was resolved when Mack claimed that he did not know Leovich was in college, and he was signed by a scout. Leovich was also looking over an offer to play for the Detroit Tigers at this time, but eventually chose the Athletics because they had a minor league team in Portland, and was familiar with some of the players and coaches.

== Professional career ==
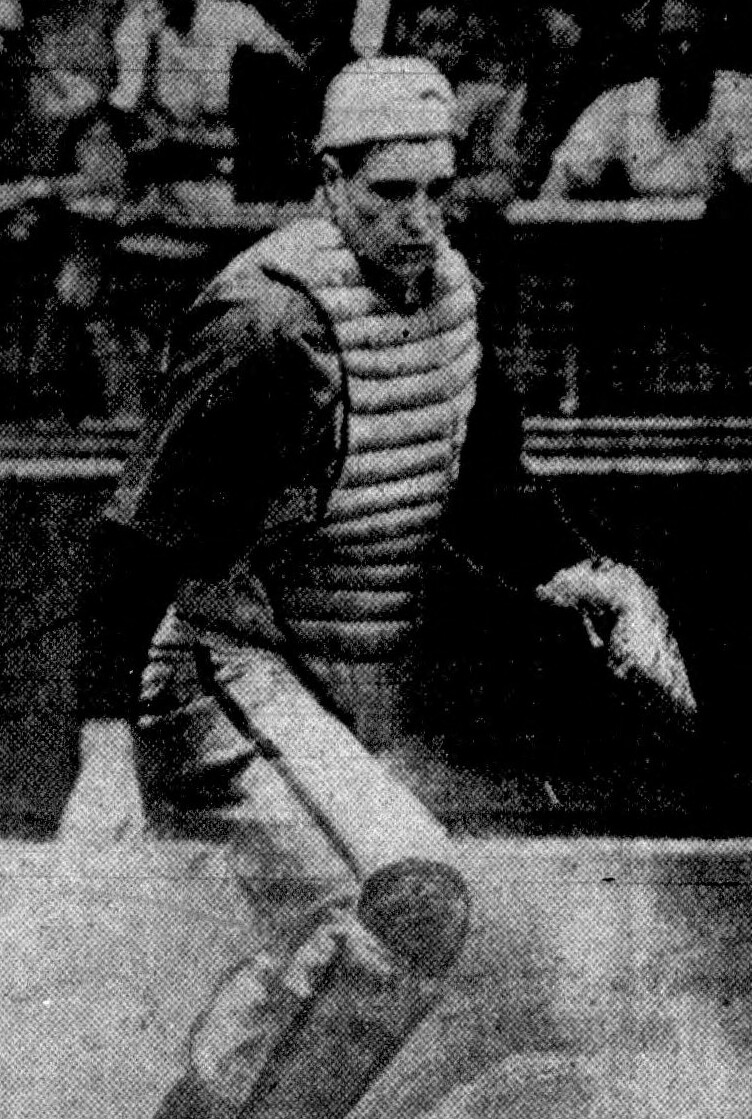
Leovich in 1942.

Leovich played his first and last game for the Philadelphia Athletics on May 1, 1941 against the Cleveland Indians. In two major league at-bats against Bob Feller, he hit a ground out to shortstop Lou Boudreau and a double to right field. He finished with a career batting average of .500. Shortly after playing in this one career game, he was optioned to the Montreal Royals of the International League. He played for the Portland Beavers the following season, hitting .190 in 117 games.

After being released on October 20, Leovich served in the United States Coast Guard in World War II. He also owned and operated Captain John's Restaurant in Lincoln City, Oregon, until his retirement in 1979. He died on February 3, 2000, in Lincoln City.
