= Al Brancato =

American baseball player (1919–2012)

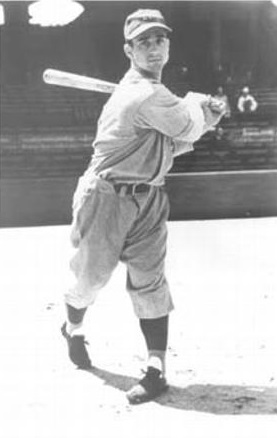
- Shortstop
- Born: May 29, 1919; Philadelphia, Pennsylvania, U.S.
- Died: June 14, 2012 (aged 93); Media, Pennsylvania, U.S.
- Batted: Right Threw: Right

MLB debut
- September 7, 1939, for the Philadelphia Athletics

Last MLB appearance
- September 19, 1945, for the Philadelphia Athletics

MLB statistics
- Batting average: .214
- Home runs: 4
- RBI: 80
- Stats at Baseball Reference

Teams
- Philadelphia Athletics (1939–1941, 1945)

Albert Brancato (May 29, 1919 – June 14, 2012) was an American shortstop and third baseman in Major League Baseball who played for the Philadelphia Athletics from 1939 to 1941 and in 1945.

== Biography ==
Brancato was born in Philadelphia on May 29, 1919, as one of seven children of Italian immigrant parents. His career in the majors was interrupted by military service in the U.S. Navy during World War II. Brancato served in the Pacific theater and played on the Navy's all-star baseball team, composed of Major League players in military service. While entertaining the troops at the all-star games, Brancato appeared alongside Joe DiMaggio, Phil Rizzuto, Bill Dickey, Tom Ferrick, Bob Feller, and Eddie Collins Jr.

== Injury and death ==
Brancato died on June 14, 2012, at age 93 at Sunrise at Granite Run, an assisted living facility in Delaware County, Pennsylvania. He had recently moved to the facility in failing health and had broken his hip several months before his death. He was a long-time resident of Upper Darby, Pennsylvania with his wife, Isabel, to whom he was married for 69 years. His children included Sister Helen Brancato, Albert Jr., and David Brancato.
