= Bill Beckmann =

American baseball player (1907–1990)

- Pitcher
- Born: December 8, 1907; Clayton, Missouri, U.S.
- Died: January 2, 1990 (aged 82); Florissant, Missouri, U.S.
- Batted: Right Threw: Right

MLB debut
- May 2, 1939, for the Philadelphia Athletics

Last MLB appearance
- September 20, 1942, for the St. Louis Cardinals

MLB statistics
- Win–loss record: 21–25
- Earned run average: 4.79
- Strikeouts: 108
- Stats at Baseball Reference

Teams
- Philadelphia Athletics (1939–1942); St. Louis Cardinals (1942)

William Aloysius Beckmann (December 8, 1907 – January 2, 1990) was an American professional baseball pitcher. He pitched all or part of four seasons in Major League Baseball, from 1939 until 1942. He pitched mostly for the Philadelphia Athletics, but appeared in his last two major league games for the St. Louis Cardinals.

Prior to the minor leagues, he graduated from Washington University in St. Louis. Beckmann spent twelve years in the Minor League Baseball before his MLB debut. His professional career began in 1927 with the Danville Veterans of the Illinois–Indiana–Iowa League. He remained in the minors until the Athletics selected him from the Atlanta Crackers in the rule 5 draft following the 1938 season. After the end of his MLB career, he pitched just one more season in the minors, playing for the Columbus Red Birds in 1943.
