= Felix Mackiewicz =

American baseball player (1917–1993)

- Outfielder
- Born: November 20, 1917; Chicago, Illinois, U.S.
- Died: December 20, 1993 (aged 76); Olivette, Missouri, U.S.
- Batted: Right Threw: Right

MLB debut
- September 7, 1941, for the Philadelphia Athletics

Last MLB appearance
- May 20, 1947, for the Washington Senators

MLB statistics
- Batting average: .259
- Home runs: 2
- Runs batted in: 55
- Stats at Baseball Reference

Teams
- Philadelphia Athletics (1941–1943); Cleveland Indians (1945–1947); Washington Senators (1947)

Felix Thaddeus Mackiewicz (November 20, 1917 – December 20, 1993) was an American professional baseball outfielder. He played in Major League Baseball (MLB) from 1941 through 1947 for the Philadelphia Athletics, Cleveland Indians, and Washington Senators.

Mackiewicz attended Purdue University, where he played college baseball for the Boilermakers from 1938 to 1940. He signed with the Athletics in 1940 and made his Major League debut in September 1941 after breaking into minor league baseball with the Class B Wilmington Blue Rocks. Mackiewicz spent 1941 and 1942 mostly with Wilmington, and played in 20 total games for the Athletics over three seasons. After being released by the Athletics a month into the 1943 season, he spent the rest of 1943 and all of 1944 with the Baltimore Orioles before being called up by the Cleveland Indians for 1945.

The 1945 and 1946 seasons where Mackiewicz only full seasons in the Majors. In 1945, as the Indian's regular center fielder, he got into 120 games, made a career-high 98 hits, and slugged his only two Major League home runs. Mackiewicz was waived by the Indians two games into the 1947 season, and was picked up by the Washington Senators, ending his major league career with three games played for them. He spent three more seasons in the minor leagues before retiring.

Altogether, he appeared in 223 big-league games and collected 174 hits, including 32 doubles and 12 triples. He concluded his professional career during the 1949 minor league season.
