= Ray Poole (baseball) =

American baseball player (1920–2006)

- Pinch hitter
- Born: January 16, 1920; Salisbury, North Carolina, US
- Died: March 1, 2006 (aged 86); Burlington, North Carolina, US
- Batted: Left Threw: Right

MLB debut
- September 9, 1941, for the Philadelphia Athletics

Last MLB appearance
- June 13, 1947, for the Philadelphia Athletics

MLB statistics
- Batting average: .200
- Home runs: 0
- Runs batted in: 1
- Stats at Baseball Reference

Teams
- Philadelphia Athletics (1941; 1947)

Raymond Herman Poole (January 16, 1920 – March 1, 2006) was an American professional baseball player whose career extended for ten seasons (1941; 1946–1954). An outfielder in minor league baseball, Poole appeared in 15 Major League games — all as a pinch hitter — for the 1941 and 1947 Philadelphia Athletics. He threw right-handed, batted left-handed, stood 6 feet (1.8 m) tall and weighed 180 pounds (82 kg). A native of Salisbury, North Carolina, he attended Catawba College in his home city. Poole served in the United States Army during World War II from 1942 to 1945.

During his brief Major League career, Poole never appeared in the field. In his 15 MLB games as a pinch hitter (two in 1941 and 13 in 1947), he recorded 16 plate appearances and 15 at bats with one base on balls and three hits, all singles. He scored one run and drove in one run as well. Much of his minor league career occurred at the Class B level, in the Piedmont and Southeastern Leagues.
