= Gene Lillard =

American baseball player (1913–1991)

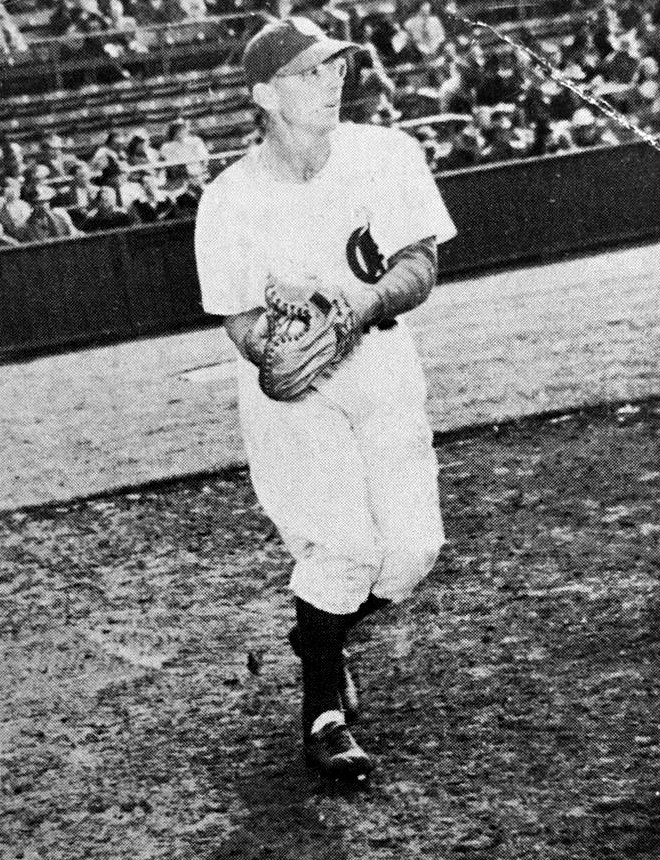
- Lillard in 1948
- Pitcher / Infielder
- Born: November 12, 1913; Santa Barbara, California, U.S.
- Died: April 12, 1991 (aged 77); Goleta, California, U.S.
- Batted: Right Threw: Right

MLB debut
- May 8, 1936, for the Chicago Cubs

Last MLB appearance
- May 20, 1940, for the St. Louis Cardinals

MLB statistics
- Win–loss record: 3–6
- Earned run average: 7.09
- Innings pitched: 59 2/3
- Batting average: .182
- Hits: 8
- Stats at Baseball Reference

Teams
- Chicago Cubs (1936; 1939); St. Louis Cardinals (1940)

Robert Eugene Lillard (November 12, 1913 – April 12, 1991) was an American professional baseball player. Primarily a pitcher in Major League Baseball (MLB), he began his baseball career as an infielder and was a prodigious minor league batsman, slugging over 300 career home runs, including 56 round-trippers as a member of the 1935 Los Angeles Angels of the Pacific Coast League.

The older brother of Bill Lillard, a former Major League shortstop, Gene Lillard was born in Santa Barbara, California. He threw and batted right-handed, stood 5 feet 10 inches (1.78 m) tall and weighed 178 pounds (81 kg). He signed with the Chicago Cubs in 1932, and by his second pro season, he had reached the top level of the minors with the PCL Angels, leading the league at age 19 with 43 home runs. In 1934 Lillard hit 27 more homers for a Los Angeles team that would storm to the Pacific Coast League title by winning 137 out of 187 games (a winning percentage of .733). Then came his superlative 1935 season, in which he played in 170 games, scored 157 runs, made 232 hits, drove home 147 RBI, and batted .361. His 56 homers led the Coast League, but Lillard was surpassed in several other key batting categories by the loop's premier player, Joe DiMaggio of the San Francisco Seals.

In 1936, Lillard made the Major Leagues with the Cubs, but he appeared in only 19 games as a shortstop and third baseman and batted only .206, with seven hits in 34 at bats and only one extra base hit, a double. Upon returning to the minors in 1937, Lillard converted to part-time pitcher, and he came back to the Majors as a moundsman for the 1939 Cubs and the 1940 St. Louis Cardinals. Working in 22 games pitched, eight as a starter, he lost six of nine decisions and gave up 76 hits and 40 bases on balls with 33 strikeouts in 59 2/3 innings pitched. At the plate in the Majors, he had eight hits in 44 at-bats, with no homers and two runs batted in.

Lillard went back to the minor leagues for good in the middle of the 1940 season, and played as a combination pitcher and position player through 1954, with the 1943–1945 campaigns missed during World War II. He was a playing manager in a variety of mid- and lower-level leagues as well. Lillard appeared in more than 2,100 minor league games. As a hitter, he batted .303 with 2,094 hits, 345 home runs and 1,414 runs batted in. As a pitcher, he won 44 and lost 32.

Gene Lillard died in Goleta, California, in April 1991, at the age of 77.
