= Pat Tobin (baseball) =

American baseball player (1916-1975)

- Pitcher
- Born: January 28, 1916; Hermitage, Arkansas
- Died: January 21, 1975 (aged 58); Shreveport, Louisiana
- Batted: Right Threw: Right

MLB debut
- August 21, 1941, for the Philadelphia Athletics

Last MLB appearance
- August 21, 1941, for the Philadelphia Athletics

MLB statistics
- Win–loss record: 0-0
- Earned run average: 36.00
- Strikeouts: 0
- Stats at Baseball Reference

Teams
- Philadelphia Athletics (1941)

Marion Brooks "Pat" Tobin (January 28, 1916 – January 21, 1975) was a Major League Baseball pitcher who played in 1941 with the Philadelphia Athletics.
