= Rankin Johnson Jr. =

American baseball player (1917–2006)

- Pitcher
- Born: March 1, 1917; Hayden, Arizona, U.S.
- Died: February 11, 2006 (aged 88); Williamsport, Pennsylvania, U.S.
- Batted: Right Threw: Right

MLB debut
- April 17, 1941, for the Philadelphia Athletics

Last MLB appearance
- May 12, 1941, for the Philadelphia Athletics

MLB statistics
- Win–loss record: 1–0
- Earned run average: 3.60
- Strikeouts: 0
- Stats at Baseball Reference

Teams
- Philadelphia Athletics (1941)

Adam Rankin Johnson Jr. (March 1, 1917 – February 11, 2006) was an American professional baseball player and executive. A pitcher during his active career, he appeared in seven games in Major League Baseball as a member of the Philadelphia Athletics during the early weeks of the 1941 season. He threw and batted right-handed, and was listed as 6 feet 3 inches (1.91 m) tall and 177 pounds (80 kg).

Johnson was born in Hayden, Arizona; his father, Rankin Sr., was also a Major League pitcher, largely with the "outlaw" Federal League, in 1914–1915 and 1918. Rankin Jr. attended what is now the University of Texas at El Paso. He appeared in one game for the 1935 Akron Yankees of the Class C Middle Atlantic League, then began his professional baseball career in earnest in 1939 at the Class D level.

== Major League trial (1941) ==
After he won 15 games in the West Texas–New Mexico League in 1940, he received his brief MLB audition the following spring. Pitching exclusively in relief, Johnson earned his only decision, a victory, on April 23, 1941, at Shibe Park. He took over from starting pitcher Nels Potter in the top of the sixth inning with the opposition Washington Senators leading, 6–1. Johnson held Washington off the scoreboard, allowing one hit (a double to Ben Chapman), before exiting the game for a pinch hitter in the bottom of the frame. The man who hit for him, Crash Davis (whose name was adopted in the 1988 film Bull Durham and given to star Kevin Costner), hit a two-run home run, part of a nine-run Philadelphia rally that saw the Athletics pull ahead, 10–6. With Johnson's successor, Tom Ferrick, earning a save, the Athletics triumphed, 11–7, giving Johnson his win.

== World War II service and executive career ==
Johnson's last appearance in the majors came May 12, also against Washington. He spent the rest of 1941 in the minor leagues with the Wilmington Blue Rocks of the Class B Interstate League. He then served in the United States Navy in the Pacific Theatre of World War II, missing four full years before returning to the minor leagues for two more seasons, 1946 and 1947. His 1–0 MLB won–lost record was accompanied by a 3.60 earned run average, with him allowing four earned runs on 14 hits and three bases on balls in ten full innings pitched; he failed to record a strikeout.

Johnson remained in baseball after his playing days as a minor league executive. From 1953 through 1960, he worked in the Williamsport Grays' front office, then was the president of the Double-A Eastern League from 1961 through 1968. He died in Williamsport, Pennsylvania, at the age of 88.

== See also ==
- List of second-generation Major League Baseball players
