= Eddie Collins Jr. =

American baseball player (1916-2000)

- Outfielder
- Born: November 23, 1916; Lansdowne, Pennsylvania, U.S.
- Died: November 2, 2000 (aged 83); Jennersville, Pennsylvania, U.S.
- Batted: Left Threw: Right

MLB debut
- July 4, 1939, for the Philadelphia Athletics

Last MLB appearance
- May 26, 1942, for the Philadelphia Athletics

MLB statistics
- Batting average: .241
- Home runs: 0
- Runs batted in: 16
- Stats at Baseball Reference

Teams
- Philadelphia Athletics (1939; 1941–1942)

Edward Trowbridge Collins Jr. (November 23, 1916 – November 2, 2000) was an American professional baseball outfielder in the Major Leagues for parts of three seasons between 1939 and 1942 for the Philadelphia Athletics.

== Career in baseball ==
Collins' father was Baseball Hall of Fame second baseman Eddie Collins, who is the only player in American baseball history to have more than 3,300 hits in under 10,000 at-bats. Born in the Philadelphia suburbs, the younger Collins attended the elite Episcopal Academy, graduating in the class of 1935. He went on to Yale University, where he played on the team that won the 1937 Ivy League championship. In 1939, his senior year, Collins was the Bulldogs' team captain. Upon graduation, he signed with the Philadelphia Athletics and played 32 games in his rookie year, 1939. For the 1940 season, Collins joined the International League, playing for the Baltimore Orioles. Then, in the 1941 season, he returned to the Athletics, appearing in a career-high 80 games. Collins played 20 games for the Athletics in 1942, before entering military service with the United States Navy.

Commissioned as a lieutenant, Collins served as a communications officer aboard the Cleveland-class light cruiser USS Miami, which participated in the Battle of Leyte Gulf and supported strikes on Iwo Jima and Okinawa.

After the war, Collins returned to the Athletics, but was released in April 1946. He went on to play in the International League for the Jersey City Giants and Buffalo Bisons before retiring from the field. In the Major Leagues, Collins appeared in 132 career games played and collected 66 hits, with nine doubles and three triples. He had 16 runs batted in.

Upon retiring as an active player, Collins joined the front office of the Philadelphia Phillies, working from 1947 to 1954 as assistant farm system director, and in 1954 and 1955 as assistant general manager.

== Educator ==
In 1955, Collins received a master's degree in education from Harvard, and went on to teach at his alma mater, the Episcopal Academy, from 1960 to 1982. His specialty was American history, and he served for years as chair of the history department at the academy. At Episcopal, Collins also coached squash and baseball.

== Family ==
Four weeks after the bombing of Pearl Harbor, Collins married Jane Pennock, the daughter of Hall of Fame pitcher Herb Pennock, who served as the general manager of the Phillies from 1944 until his sudden death in January 1948. The couple had known each other since childhood. The wedding, which took place at the Episcopal Church of the Advent in Kennett Square, Pennsylvania, was officiated by the Rev. Paul Collins, brother of the groom. The Collins family settled in Kennett Square, where the Pennock family had been landowners since the end of the seventeenth century. There, they raised two sons, Peter and Edward Trowbridge Collins III. After 58 years of marriage, Eddie Collins and his wife Jane died within five weeks of each other in 2000.

== See also ==
- List of second-generation Major League Baseball players
