= Dee Miles =

American baseball player (1909–1976)

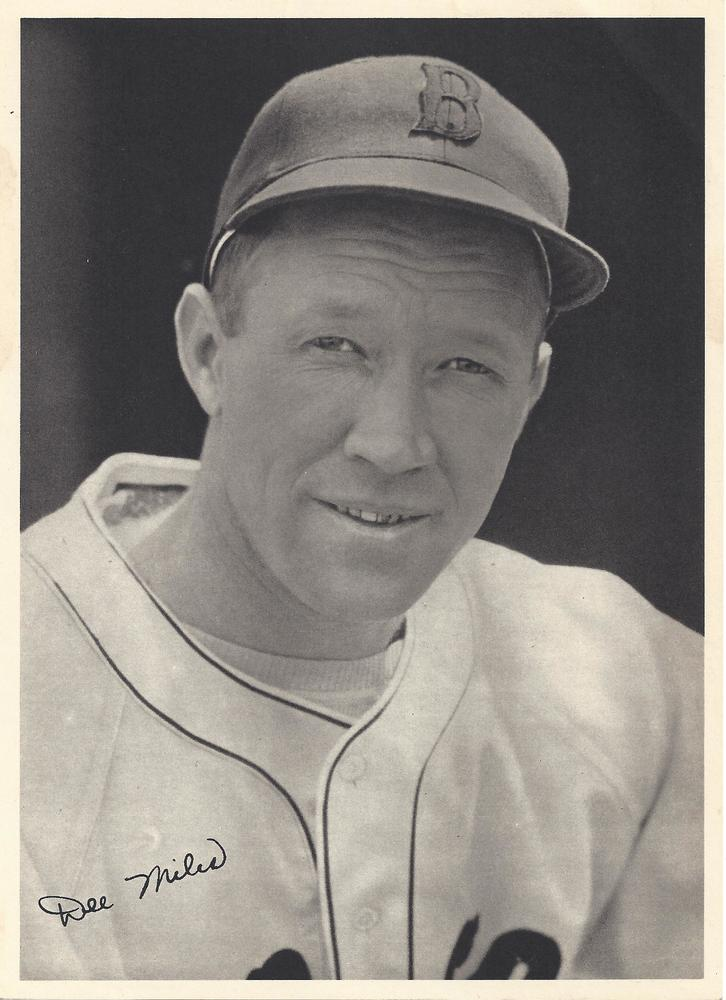
- Outfielder
- Born: February 15, 1909; Kellerman, Alabama, US
- Died: November 2, 1976 (aged 67); Birmingham, Alabama, US
- Batted: Left Threw: Right

MLB debut
- July 7, 1935, for the Washington Senators

Last MLB appearance
- July 5, 1943, for the Boston Red Sox

MLB statistics
- Batting average: .280
- Home runs: 2
- Runs batted in: 143
- Stats at Baseball Reference

Teams
- Washington Senators (1935–1936); Philadelphia Athletics (1939–1942); Boston Red Sox (1943)

Wilson Daniel Miles (February 15, 1909 – November 2, 1976) was an American professional baseball outfielder. He played in Major League Baseball (MLB) from 1935 to 1943 for the Washington Senators, Philadelphia Athletics, and Boston Red Sox. He was a 1928 graduate of Hueytown High School in Alabama where he was also Captain and Quarterback of the football team.

== Career ==
Miles began his professional career with the Chambersburg Young Yanks of the Blue Ridge League in 1930. He made it to the major leagues with the Washington Senators in 1935 and served primarily as a backup outfielder, and in all but one of his games with the Senators, he played right field. He was not in the major leagues in 1937 or 1938, but was in the Senators' organization when he was traded to the Philadelphia Athletics for US$30,000 and outfielder Bill Nicholson. Miles remained with the Athletics from 1939 through 1942 and had his most productive seasons with them, hitting both of his career home runs as a member of that team. He was acquired by the Boston Red Sox for the 1943 season and played in 45 games with them before being traded in July to San Francisco of the Pacific Coast League for Catfish Metkovich.
