= 1939 in baseball =

The following are the baseball events of the year 1939 throughout the world.

== Headline events of the year ==
An emotional Lou Gehrig, at the "Appreciation Day" held in his honor at Yankee Stadium on July 4, 1939

- The Gehrig saga turns tragic. Following a poor 1938 season—by his lofty standards—Lou Gehrig experiences ongoing losses of strength and motor coordination over the winter. He struggles to hit, run, and field his position during spring training and the first ten days of the 1939 campaign. After playing in his 2,130th straight game on April 30, he takes himself out of the New York Yankees' starting lineup two days later, and will never play another MLB game. A weeklong exam at the Mayo Clinic in mid-June reveals that he is suffering from amyotrophic lateral sclerosis (ALS), an incurable and deadly neurodegenerative disease. On June 21, he ends his playing career at age 36, and on July 4, at a ceremony in his honor before 61,808 spectators at Yankee Stadium, he makes one of the most powerful and poignant speeches in American sporting history. Later in 1939, he accepts a job as a member of the New York City parole commission. In early December, the National Baseball Hall of Fame and Museum, which opened its doors on June 12, waives its waiting period for eligibility and admits Gehrig to Cooperstown. A few weeks later, the Yankees retire Gehrig's uniform #4—making him the first player in major league history to be afforded such an honor.
- Television comes to baseball. On May 17, Princeton University and Columbia University play the first televised baseball game. On August 26, the Cincinnati Reds and Brooklyn Dodgers play the first televised Major League Baseball game, with Red Barber at the microphone.

== Champions ==
=== Major League Baseball ===
- World Series: New York Yankees over Cincinnati Reds (4–0)
- All-Star Game, July 11 at Yankee Stadium: American League, 3–1

=== Other champions ===
- Negro American League Champion: Kansas City Monarchs
- Negro National League Champion: Baltimore Elite Giants
- Amateur World Series: Cuba
- Negro League Baseball All-Star Game: West, 4–2 (first game, at Comiskey Park); East, 10–2 (second game, in New York City)

== Awards and honors ==
- Baseball Hall of Fame
  - Cap Anson
  - Eddie Collins
  - Charles Comiskey
  - Candy Cummings
  - Buck Ewing
  - Lou Gehrig
  - Willie Keeler
  - Charles Radbourn
  - George Sisler
  - Al Spalding
- Most Valuable Player
  - Joe DiMaggio, New York Yankees, OF (AL)
  - Bucky Walters, Cincinnati Reds, P (NL)
- The Sporting News Player of the Year Award
  - Joe DiMaggio, New York Yankees, OF
- The Sporting News Most Valuable Player Award
  - Joe DiMaggio, New York Yankees, OF
  - Bucky Walters, Cincinnati Reds, P
- The Sporting News Manager of the Year Award
  - Leo Durocher, Brooklyn Dodgers

== Statistical leaders ==
Any team shown in small text indicates a previous team a player was on during the season.

	American League		National League		Negro American League		Negro National League	
Stat	Player	Total	Player	Total	Player	Total	Player	Total
AVG	Joe DiMaggio (NYY)	.381	Johnny Mize (STL)	.349	Henry Turner (CBR)	.393	Josh Gibson (HOM)	.402
HR	Jimmie Foxx (BOS)	35	Johnny Mize (STL)	28	Turkey Stearnes (KCM)	7	Josh Gibson (HOM); Buck Leonard (HOM)	11
RBI	Ted Williams (BOS)	145	Frank McCormick (CIN)	128	Willard Brown (KCM)	42	Buck Leonard (HOM)	48
W	Bob Feller (CLE)	24	Bucky Walters^{1} (CIN)	27	Smoky Owens (CBR); George Walker (KCM)	8	Henry McHenry (PHS)	11
ERA	Lefty Grove (BOS)	2.54	Bucky Walters^{1} (CIN)	2.29	Felix Evans (ATL)	1.86	Roy Partlow (HOM)	1.74
K	Bob Feller (CLE)	246	Claude Passeau (CHC/PHI); Bucky Walters^{1} (CIN)	137	Hilton Smith (KCM)	85	Neck Stanley (NBY)	44

^{1} National League Triple Crown pitching winner

== Major league baseball final standings ==
=== American League final standings ===
American League
Team	W	L	Pct.	GB	Home	Road
New York Yankees	106	45	.702	—	52‍–‍25	54‍–‍20
Boston Red Sox	89	62	.589	17	42‍–‍32	47‍–‍30
Cleveland Indians	87	67	.565	20½	44‍–‍33	43‍–‍34
Chicago White Sox	85	69	.552	22½	50‍–‍27	35‍–‍42
Detroit Tigers	81	73	.526	26½	42‍–‍35	39‍–‍38
Washington Senators	65	87	.428	41½	37‍–‍39	28‍–‍48
Philadelphia Athletics	55	97	.362	51½	28‍–‍48	27‍–‍49
St. Louis Browns	43	111	.279	64½	18‍–‍59	25‍–‍52

Locations of teams for the 1934–1939 American League seasons
American League

=== National League final standings ===
National League
Team	W	L	Pct.	GB	Home	Road
Cincinnati Reds	97	57	.630	—	55‍–‍25	42‍–‍32
St. Louis Cardinals	92	61	.601	4½	51‍–‍27	41‍–‍34
Brooklyn Dodgers	84	69	.549	12½	51‍–‍27	33‍–‍42
Chicago Cubs	84	70	.545	13	44‍–‍34	40‍–‍36
New York Giants	77	74	.510	18½	41‍–‍33	36‍–‍41
Pittsburgh Pirates	68	85	.444	28½	35‍–‍42	33‍–‍43
Boston Bees	63	88	.417	32½	37‍–‍35	26‍–‍53
Philadelphia Phillies	45	106	.298	50½	29‍–‍44	16‍–‍62

Locations of teams for the 1938–1940 National League seasons
National League

== Negro league baseball final standings ==
All Negro leagues standings below are per MLB and Seamheads.

=== Negro American League final standings ===
vs. Negro American League						vs. Major Black teams			
Negro American League	W	L	T	Pct.	GB	W	L	T	Pct.
^{(1)} Kansas City Monarchs	38	22	0	.633	—	60	35	0	.632
Chicago American Giants	32	31	0	.508	7½	45	42	0	.517
Cleveland Bears	20	21	0	.488	8½	24	36	0	.400
^{(2)} St. Louis Stars	20	23	2	.467	9½	25	35	2	.419
Memphis Red Sox	24	29	1	.454	10½	42	54	1	.438
Toledo Crawfords†	8	10	1	.447	9	10	16	1	.389
Indianapolis ABCs	1	7	0	.125	11	8	20	0	.286

^{(1)} First half champion ^{(2)} Second half champion
†Toledo Crawfords joined the league for the second half of the season.

==== Negro American League postseason ====
- Kansas City Monarchs over St. Louis Stars (4–1)
Locations of teams for the 1939 Negro American League season
Negro American League

=== Negro National League final standings ===
vs. Negro National League						vs. Major Black teams			
Negro National League	W	L	T	Pct.	GB	W	L	T	Pct.
^{(1)} Homestead Grays	32	18	1	.637	—	49	21	1	.697
^{(2)} Newark Eagles	35	25	1	.582	2	45	27	1	.623
^{(3)} Philadelphia Stars	32	31	1	.508	6½	32	31	1	.508
^{(4)} Baltimore Elite Giants	22	25	0	.468	8½	31	32	0	.492
New York Black Yankees	20	23	4	.468	8½	23	25	4	.481
Toledo Crawfords†	4	6	1	.409	8	4	6	1	.409
New York Cubans	7	24	0	.226	15½	9	27	0	.250

†Toledo Crawfords withdrew from the league after the first half of the season.

==== Negro National League postseason ====
The National League had four playoff teams compete against each other before the championship series.

- National League Playoff Series
- Homestead Grays over Philadelphia Stars (3–2)
- Baltimore Elite Giants over Newark Eagles (3–1)
- National League Championship Series
- Baltimore Elite Giants over Homestead Grays (3–1–1)
Locations of teams for the 1939 Negro National League season
Negro National League
Traveling teams: New York Black Yankees, New York Cubans
Notes: Homestead Grays played in both Pittsburgh and Washington, D.C., with the majority of games in Pittsburgh.

== Events ==
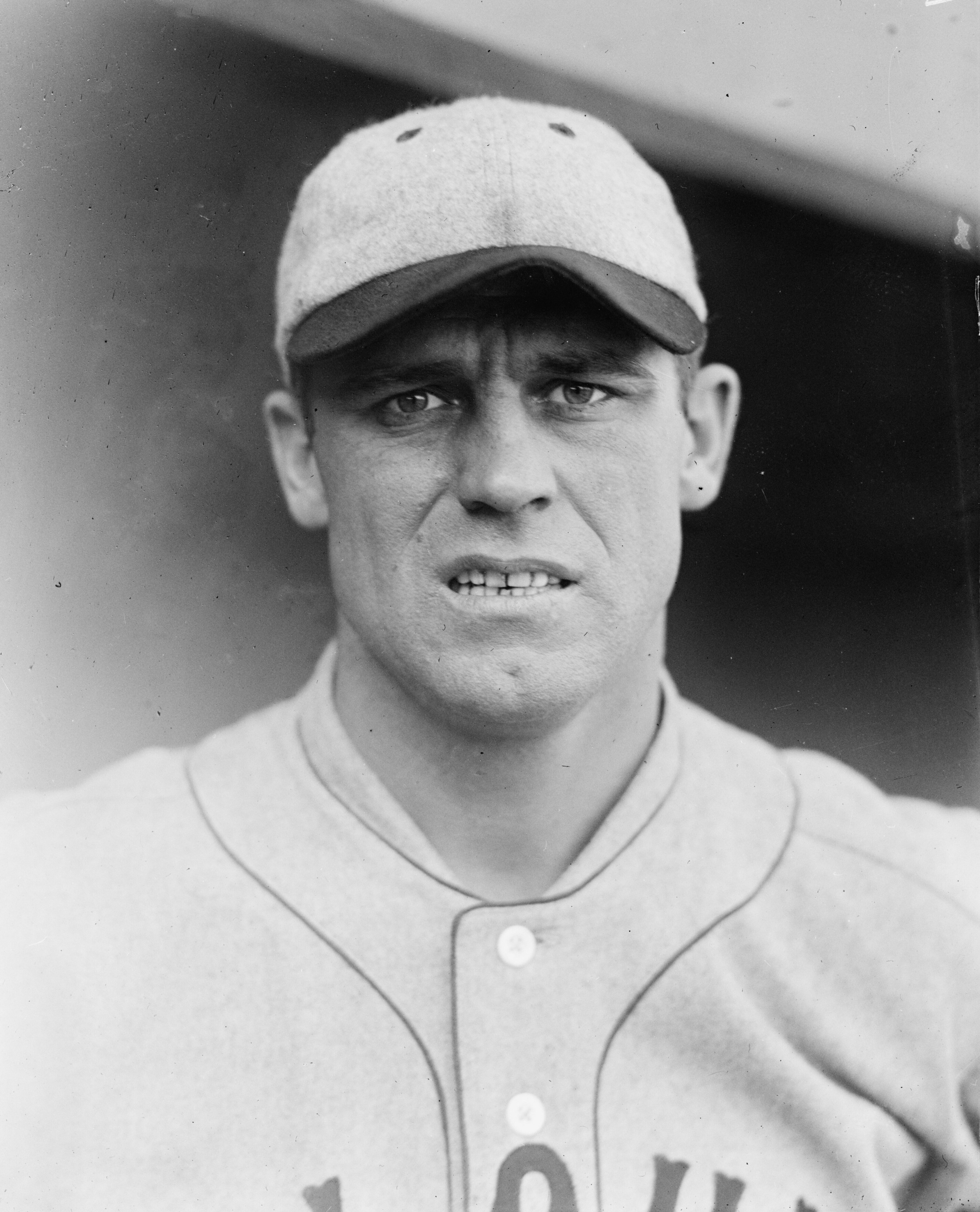
George Sisler

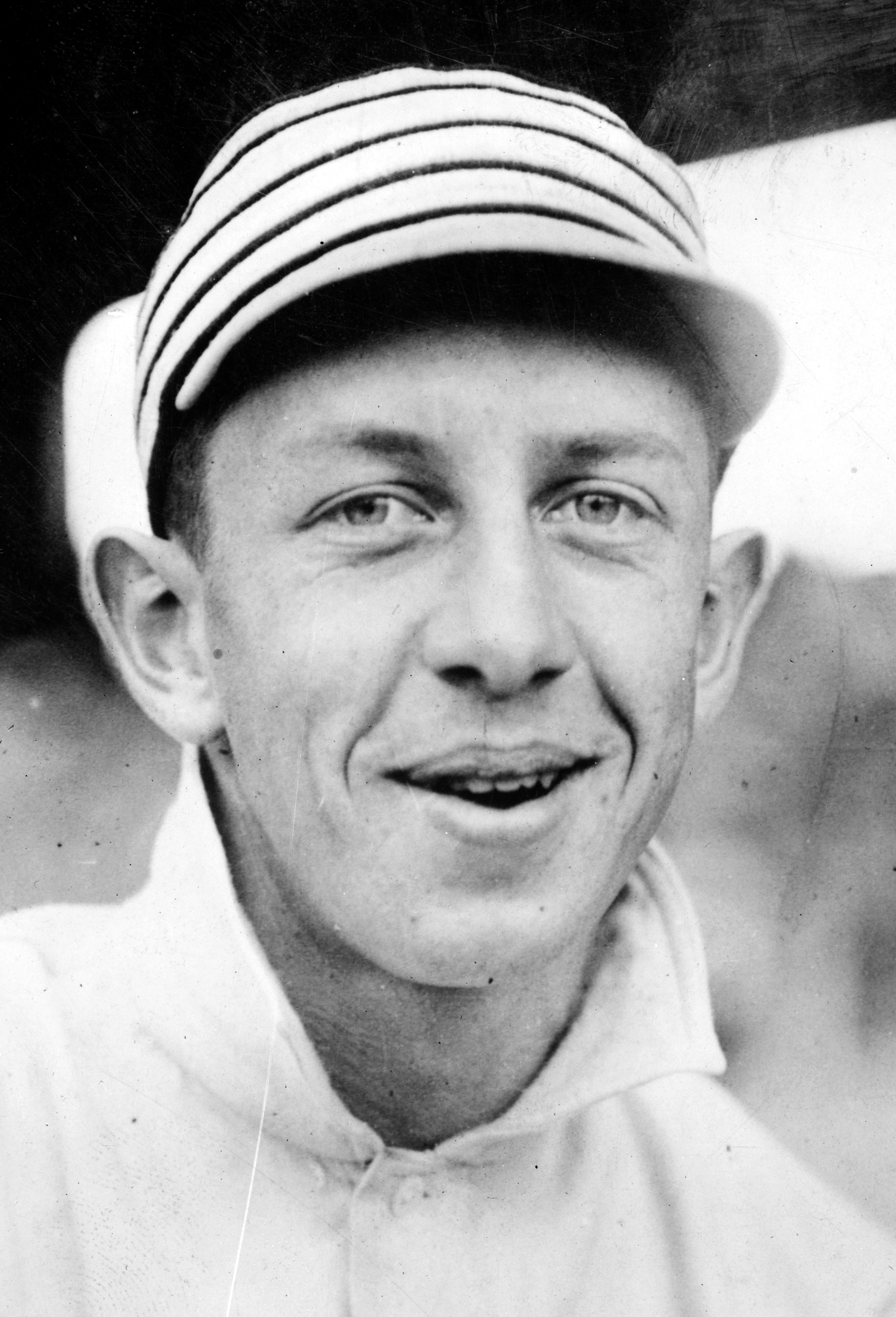
Eddie Collins

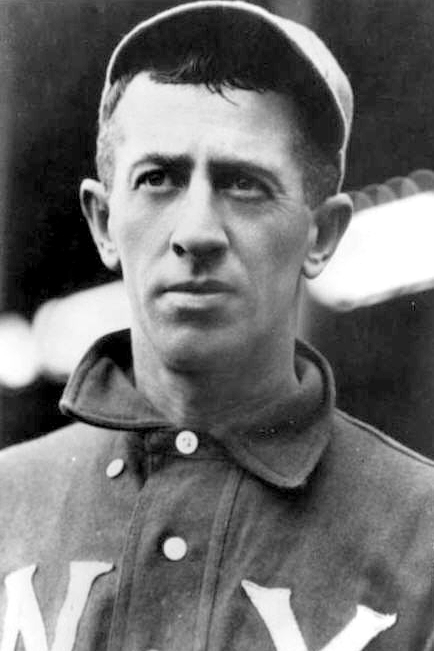
Willie Keeler

=== January ===
- January 5 – Proceeding on the then-prevalent assumption that Abner Doubleday invented the sport of baseball in a Cooperstown, New York, cow pasture in 1839, "Organized" professional baseball begins a year of centennial celebrations with a gala dinner in Philadelphia featuring honored guests Connie Mack, Clark Griffith and American League president Will Harridge.
  - The celebrations will reach a high point with the June opening of the National Baseball Hall of Fame and Museum in Cooperstown.
  - Baseball's 1839 "origin story" is largely based on the 1908 Mills Commission Report, and has been disputed since the document's publication; it will eventually be called the "Doubleday myth." Nevertheless, the myth takes root among Americans who, for patriotic reasons, reject ample evidence that the game evolved from common bat-and-ball games in Great Britain and Ireland.
- January 8 – Righty Bobo Newsom, who accounted for 36 percent of the St. Louis Browns' entire win total in 1938, threatens to spend the 1939 baseball season "picking cotton" unless his salary exceeds $20,000. Newsom went 20–16 for a penniless, 55–97–4 team that finished last in the AL in attendance last season, but the South Carolinian posted a poor 5.08 earned run average.
- January 14 – The 15-year MLB pitching career of right-hander Charles "Red" Lucas concludes when he's unconditionally released by the Pittsburgh Pirates. "The Nashville Narcissus" won 157 National League games, 109 with the Cincinnati Reds between 1926 and 1934, and led the NL in complete games three times. A skilled batsman, Lucas hit .281 lifetime (404 for 1,439) with three home runs and 190 runs batted in, was frequently used as a pinch hitter, and started 12 games as a position player.
- January 17 – Ed Barrow, 70, since November 1920 the business manager of the New York Yankees, is elected to succeed the late Jacob Ruppert as club president; he will continue to serve as the Bombers' de facto general manager. Ruppert, who died four days ago, became co-owner of the Yankees in 1915 and sole owner in 1923; since 1921, the franchise has won ten pennants and seven World Series—including the last three Fall Classics in a row.
- January 24 – First baseman George Sisler (85.8% of ballots cast), second baseman Eddie Collins (77.7%) and the late outfielder Willie Keeler (75.5%) are elected to the Baseball Hall of Fame by the Baseball Writers' Association of America. The trio represent the fourth annual class of inductees since the Hall was launched in 1936.
- January 25
  - Lou Gehrig signs his 1939 contract for a reported $4,000 pay cut after a subpar 1938 campaign. The New York Times reports him to be “supremely confident that he will stage a strong comeback this year” and pledging to report to the New York Yankees’ Saint Petersburg spring training camp a week earlier than customary to improve his conditioning.
  - Reacting to the Brooklyn Dodgers' embargo-breaking decision to broadcast on radio station WOR all home and road games, the Yankees and New York Giants say they will air all their home games, except on Sundays, over WABC. Prior to this season, the three New York clubs had agreed not to broadcast any home or road game to protect each other's turnstile counts.

=== February ===
- February 2 – Brooklyn Dodgers general manager Larry MacPhail brings Red Barber to New York City as the Dodgers' first-ever radio play-by-play announcer. Barber, 30, spent the past five seasons as the voice of the Cincinnati Reds—initially hired by MacPhail. He'll become a broadcasting legend in New York over the next 28 years, reporting Dodgers' and Yankees' games, and be honored in Cooperstown as one of the first two recipients of the Ford C. Frick Award.
- February 8 – Ignoring protests from neighborhood residents, Philadelphia's zoning board approves the installation of lights and the advent of night baseball at Shibe Park, home stadium of the Athletics and Phillies, in time for the 1939 season. Connie Mack's Athletics are poised to host the first night game in American League history.
- February 14 – The Chicago Cubs sign free-agent left-hander Earl Whitehill, released February 1 by the Cleveland Indians. Whitehill, 40, has won 214 games for three AL teams since his 1923 debut, including a 22-win campaign for the 1933 pennant-winning Washington Senators.

=== March ===
Jeff Heath in 1942

- March 1 – Outfielder Jeff Heath, whose 18 triples led the American League and .343 batting average was second among AL hitters last season, is banned from the Cleveland Indians' spring training camp in New Orleans because he's holding out for a higher salary.
- March 10 – First-year Brooklyn Dodgers player–manager Leo Durocher tells reporters he's "very 'high'" on another rookie, 19-year-old Hal "Pete" Reiser, a switch-hitting shortstop who played in the Class D Northern League in 1938 but has been impressing Durocher at bat and in the field during a spring training audition. "The boy is a wiz, I'm telling you," the manager, also a shortstop, says. When the youngster's stellar play continues—he goes eight for eight with three homers over a three-game stretch, March 22–24—Durocher will soon be battling his boss, Larry MacPhail, in a vain attempt to keep Reiser on Brooklyn's varsity roster.
- March 15 – A Hall of Famer and a future Cooperstown inductee join the ranks of baseball broadcasters, when all-time pitching great Walter Johnson, 51, is named to the Washington Senators' radio team, and former second baseman and manager Frankie Frisch, 41, becomes the voice of Boston's two MLB clubs, the Bees and Red Sox. Johnson was one of the first five men elected to the Hall in 1936; Frisch will enter it in 1947.
- March 16 – The Cincinnati Reds purchase the contract of Billy Werber from the Philadelphia Athletics for a reported $25,000. In Werber, a 30-year-old American League veteran, the Reds gain their starting third baseman for their 1939 and 1940 NL pennant-winning teams. He had been squabbling with Connie Mack over his salary for the coming year.
- March 22
  - Batting only .132 (five-for-38) with five errors in the field in ten spring training games, Lou Gehrig is “given a day off” for a Haines City, Florida, exhibition game. The Gehrig of 1939, says The New York Times, “has not been even a reminder of the Gehrig that once was.”
    - In a lengthy interview with columnist John Kieran five days later, Gehrig concedes, “I look terrible now.” But he pushes back against speculation that his career is in jeopardy. “I’ll bet I’ve missed two dozen exhibition games, at least [over the years]. But ... this time they say the old Iron Horse is ready for the glue factory.”
  - Chicago White Sox pitcher Vic Frazier hurls four innings and allows one hit in an exhibition game victory against the Pittsburgh Pirates in Los Angeles while pitching with an undiagnosed fractured skull, suffered the day before when he was struck in the back of the head by a thrown ball. Physicians expect the 34-year-old hurler to be hospitalized for five weeks; he'll make his 1939 debut on May 16.
- March 31 – The Boston Bees acquire right-hander "Barnacle Bill" Posedel from the Brooklyn Dodgers for catcher Al Todd. Posedel, 32, will lead Boston's pitchers with 15 victories in 1940, tied for seventh-best in the National League.

=== April ===
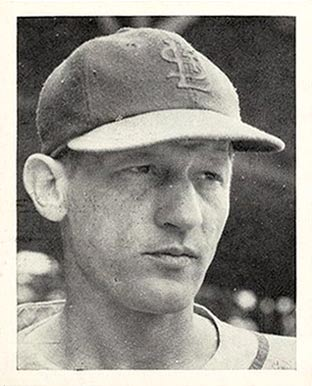
Lon Warneke

- April 6 – An exhibition game between the northbound Boston Red Sox and Cincinnati Reds in Florence, South Carolina, is halted after eight innings with the score 18–18 because umpires run out of baseballs. The two teams combine for 46 hits under dusty, wind-blown conditions.
- April 17
  - A new Opening Day tradition begins when the National League season gets underway in the city that hosted baseball's first all-professional team, the 1869 Cincinnati Red Stockings. At Crosley Field, the Cincinnati Reds, 1939's likely NL pennant-winners according to an Associated Press poll, can't withstand a late-game rally by the visiting Pittsburgh Pirates and lose the contest, 7–5. The game is played amid fears that rising floodwaters from the Ohio River and local creeks will swamp the ballpark. Reds shortstop Billy Myers is knocked cold when he's struck behind the left ear by a thrown ball in the second inning.
  - Heavy rains postpone the American League's traditional "Presidential Opener" at Griffith Stadium, which would have pitted the Washington Senators against the consensus AL favorites, the three-time-defending World Series champion New York Yankees.
- April 18 – The Hall-of-Fame managerial career of playing skipper Leo Durocher gets off on the wrong foot when the rival New York Giants lash 13 hits—including a home run from AL refugee Zeke Bonura—and defeat Durocher's Brooklyn Dodgers, 7–3, at Ebbets Field before 25,496. The game marks Red Barber's debut as Brooklyn's radio voice, and is the first game to be broadcast by one of New York City's three franchises.
- April 20 – On Opening Day at Yankee Stadium, in a game delayed by rain for two days and before 30,278 fans, the Bombers' Lou Gehrig plays in his 2,123rd consecutive game, extending his all-time record. He goes hitless in four at bats against Lefty Grove of the Boston Red Sox, hitting into two double plays, and makes an error in the field. The Yankees' Red Ruffing scatters seven Boston hits in a 2–0, complete-game victory and the second Opening Day shutout in franchise history.
  - The Red Sox show off prize rookie Ted Williams. After Ruffing strikes him out in his maiden MLB at bat, Williams, 20, doubles in the fourth inning for his first hit; he goes one-for-four.
  - The game features ten Hall of Famers, five on each side: Gehrig, Grove, Ruffing, Williams, Joe Cronin, Bill Dickey, Joe DiMaggio, Bobby Doerr, Jimmie Foxx and Joe Gordon. Today's game is the only one in which Williams and Gehrig will appear in the same box score.
  - George Pipgras, today's third-base umpire, was the Yankees' starting pitcher in their 1929 opener. His opponent for the Red Sox that day was Ruffing.
- April 22 – The streaking Los Angeles Angels of the Pacific Coast League are stopped short of their 20th consecutive victory (and a PCL record) when the San Diego Padres hand them a 12–3 setback at LA's Wrigley Field. Nevertheless, the 19–3 Angels hold a 7½-game lead in the three-week-old Coast League season.
- April 23 – Rookie Ted Williams goes 4-for-5, including his first major-league home run, a three-run blast in the first inning off Bud Thomas, but the Boston Red Sox lose to the lowly Philadelphia Athletics, 12–8, at Fenway Park.
- April 29
  - In an MLB season that will lack a single no-hit game, Lon Warneke of the St. Louis Cardinals allows one safety, a seventh-inning infield single to Stan Hack, and shuts out his old team, the Chicago Cubs, 2–0, at Wrigley Field. Warneke hurls his second straight complete-game shutout in two appearances, and his one-hitter is one of three to be posted in the NL this season.
  - In his seventh game of 1939, New York Yankees center fielder Joe DiMaggio makes a sharp turn while trying to field a triple off the bat of Bobby Estalella of the Washington Senators, and tears muscles in his right calf. The Yankees lose, 3–1, and DiMaggio will be sidelined until May 27. He's batting .435 (10-for-23) on the young season.
- April 30 – At Yankee Stadium, Lou Gehrig appears in his 2,130th consecutive major league game, a record that will stand for the next 56 years. He goes hitless in four at bats in a 3–2 loss to the Senators, and is now hitting just .143 this season. In his last at bat, in the eighth facing Pete Appleton, he flies out to center and fails to advance two teammates who are on base. A crowd of 23,712 unknowingly witnesses the final official game of Gehrig's brilliant, 17-year career.

1887 baseball card of "Old Hoss" Radbourn (standing)

=== May ===
- May 2
  - Lou Gehrig voluntarily benches himself "for the good of the team" prior to today's game at Briggs Stadium, and ends his consecutive-game streak. Ellsworth "Babe" Dahlgren replaces him in the line-up, and goes two-for-five with a home run. The New York Yankees bat around in three innings, collect 17 hits and 12 bases on balls, and trounce the host Detroit Tigers, 22–2, behind Red Ruffing.
  - The National Baseball Hall of Fame and Museum welcomes six "Old Timers" to its rolls: Cap Anson, Charles Comiskey, Candy Cummings, William "Buck" Ewing, Charles "Old Hoss" Radbourn, and Al Spalding. All played during the 19th century, and all are deceased. They are selected by Commissioner of Baseball Kenesaw Mountain Landis and the two league presidents.
- May 3 – The Brooklyn Dodgers purchase the contract of veteran American League shortstop Lyn Lary, 33, from the Cleveland Indians.
- May 4 – The Dodgers' board of directors extends the contract of general manager Larry MacPhail, and names him club president. Since MacPhail, 49, joined Brooklyn last year, he has been making major changes on and off the field in an attempt to revitalize the franchise.
- May 5 – Philadelphia Athletics outfielder Sam Chapman hits for the cycle in his club's 10–5 triumph over the St. Louis Browns at Sportsman's Park.
- May 13
  - The official 100th anniversary day of baseball's Doubleday "origin story" is marked by a clash between two college teams, the Fordham Rams and Boston College Eagles, at Cooperstown's Doubleday Field. Fordham right-hander Hank Borowy, a future MLB All-Star, throws a 5–0 shutout before 3,000 spectators.
  - In a ten-player megatrade, the St. Louis Browns send pitchers Bobo Newsom and Jim Walkup, infielder Red Kress and outfielder Beau Bell to the Detroit Tigers for pitchers George Gill, Bob Harris, Vern Kennedy and Roxie Lawson, infielder Mark Christman and outfielder Chet Laabs. Newsom will win 21 games for the 1940 AL champion Tigers; Christman and Laabs will figure prominently in the Browns' pennant-winning 1944 season.
- May 14
  - The mother of 20-year-old Cleveland pitcher Bob Feller watches her son pitch in the majors for the first time. In the third inning, Marv Owen of the Chicago White Sox fouls a pitch into the stands which strikes her in the face and shatters her eyeglasses; she needs six stitches to close the wound and is briefly hospitalized. Her son fires a complete-game, 9–4 victory for his sixth win (against one loss) of 1939.
  - Righty Lou Fette of the Boston Bees posts his fifth win and complete game of 1939, and his teammates push over a ninth-inning run, to defeat the visiting Brooklyn Dodgers, 1–0, and sweep a three-game series at National League Park. Casey Stengel's Bees, who finished fifth in 1938, improve their record to 12–9 and are only a half-game out of the NL lead.
  - The New York Giants sign free-agent second baseman Tony Lazzeri, released yesterday by the Brooklyn Dodgers. The future Hall of Famer, and five-time World Series champion during his long tenure with the Yankees, is 35 and in his last big-league season.
- May 16
  - On a chilly spring evening, the Philadelphia Athletics host the first night game to be played in the American League, falling to the Indians, 8–3, before 15,109 at Shibe Park. Cleveland capitalizes on Roy Parmelee's wildness to salt away the game with five ninth-inning runs.
  - In the New York Yankees' first home game since Lou Gehrig left their lineup two weeks ago, his successor at first base, Babe Dahlgren, smashes an eighth-inning, inside-the-park home run to provide the ultimate winning margin in a 7–5 victory over the St. Louis Browns. Dahlgren also foils a Browns' rally with a dazzling defensive play.
- May 17
  - Princeton defeats Columbia 2–1 in the first-ever baseball game to be televised. W2XBS, an experimental television station based in New York City and affiliated with NBC, broadcasts the game.
  - In the second-longest game of 1939, the Chicago Cubs and the visiting Brooklyn Dodgers play 19 innings but cannot break a 9–9 tie before darkness descends on Wrigley Field. The Dodgers' Vito Tamulis hurls 11 scoreless innings in relief but fails to gain a decision; the teams combine for nine errors, six by the Cubs. The game ends in a tie and will be replayed in its entirety, but individual statistics will count.
- May 24 – The Detroit Tigers, behind Dizzy Trout, spoil the New York Yankees' 12-game winning streak, 6–1. Now 22–6, the Bombers gained a share of first place on May 7, and today are 4½ games in front in the AL standings. The streak, kept intact when a game in which they trailed was washed away by rain in the fifth inning two days ago, is the longest in Joe McCarthy's tenure at the Yankee helm, which began in 1931.
  - The Yankees are in the midst of a torrid month of May that will see them win 24 of 28 games and outscore their opponents, 213–105, despite the absence of an injured Joe DiMaggio, who'll make only two pinch-hitting appearances all month, and Lou Gehrig.
- May 25 – Bob Feller fires the first of the two one-hitters he'll throw in the next 33 days, and his Cleveland Indians down the Boston Red Sox, 11–0, at Fenway Park. Bobby Doerr's second-inning single is Boston's only safety; Feller walks five and fans ten.
- May 27
  - The Cincinnati Reds complete a 12-game winning streak of their own that lands them in first place in the National League by two games over the St. Louis Cardinals. The Reds (23–10) will remain NL front-runners for the remainder of the season.
  - Future Hall of Famer Charlie Gehringer of the Detroit Tigers, 36 and in his 16th season, registers what will be the only "cycle" of his illustrious career in a 12–5 drubbing of the St. Louis Browns at Briggs Stadium. His eighth-inning home run completes the achievement.
- May 29 – The Chicago Cubs acquire right-hander Claude Passeau from the Philadelphia Phillies in exchange for pitchers Kirby Higbe and Ray Harrell and outfielder Joe Marty.

=== June ===
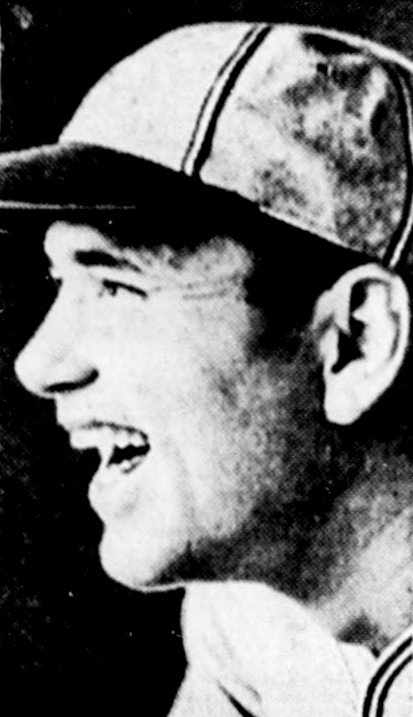
Dizzy Dean in 1941

- June 2 – The St. Louis Browns and Chicago White Sox exchange right-handed pitchers, with St. Louis obtaining John Whitehead for Johnny Marcum.
- June 4
  - The Browns sweep a doubleheader from the Washington Senators at Sportsman's Park to end an 11-game losing streak, then go on to lose their next six in a row. The 1939 Browns (who finish 43–111–2, eighth and last in the American League, 64½ games out of the lead) will never win more than two games in a row all season.
  - Yankee Stadium hosts the first in a series of five Negro National League doubleheaders that will determine the winner of the "Jacob Ruppert Trophy," donated by the late Yankees owner in "tribute to Negro baseball." In today's games, ten thousand see the Baltimore Elite Giants and New York Black Yankees triumph over the New York Cubans and Philadelphia Stars.
- June 5 – At Briggs Stadium, the American League Yankees are shut out for the only time in 1939, when the Detroit Tigers' Tommy Bridges holds them to just four hits in a 3–0 victory. Bridges improves his record to 7–1 (1.94).
- June 6
  - The sixth-place New York Giants break a 45-year-old National League record by smashing five home runs in one inning in a 17–3 thumping of the first-place Cincinnati Reds at the Polo Grounds. The fourth-inning assault features long balls from Harry Danning, Frank Demaree, Burgess Whitehead, pitcher Manny Salvo, and Jo-Jo Moore. The previous mark of four home runs in a single frame was set by the 1894 Pirates.
  - The first Little League game takes place in Williamsport, Pennsylvania. Lundy Lumber defeats Lycoming Dairy, 23–8.
- June 7
  - After making three pinch-hitting appearances starting May 27, Joe DiMaggio returns as the New York Yankees' center fielder in a 5–2 victory at Comiskey Park over the Chicago White Sox. He had missed 32 games after severely injuring his right calf trying a make a catch in an April 29 game against the Washington Senators.
  - The Pittsburgh Pirates sign free-agent, 34-year-old outfielder and 1932 NL Most Valuable Player Chuck Klein, released yesterday by the Philadelphia Phillies. Klein hit only .247 in 1938 and is batting a lowly .191 in 25 games for the Phils this season.
- June 12
  - In Cooperstown, New York, the official dedication of the National Baseball Hall of Fame takes place. Grover Cleveland Alexander, Ty Cobb, Eddie Collins, Walter Johnson, Nap Lajoie, Babe Ruth, George Sisler, Tris Speaker, Honus Wagner, Cy Young and Connie Mack are all present, and accept their plaques.
  - Team captain Lou Gehrig appears in the New York Yankees' lineup for the first time since April 30 in an exhibition game at Kansas City's Ruppert Stadium against the Blues, one of the Bombers' two top farm teams. Before a record crowd of 23,864, he plays three innings in the field and, in his lone at bat, grounds out to first base. Afterwards, Gehrig departs for Minnesota for week-long medical tests at the Mayo Clinic to seek the cause of his declining health. It's the last baseball game Gehrig will play.
- June 13 – The Yankees deal rookie outfielder Joe "Muscles" Gallagher, 25, to the St. Louis Browns for infielder Roy Hughes and cash.
- June 14 – The Cleveland Indians trade outfielder Earl Averill, 37, a future Hall of Famer, to the Detroit Tigers for 23-year-old left-handed pitcher Harry Eisenstat and cash. Averill is a six-time AL All-Star who has batted .322 with 1,154 hits and 226 homers in his 11 seasons in a Cleveland uniform.
- June 15 – The Pittsburgh Pirates acquire first baseman Elbie Fletcher from the Boston Bees for infielder Bill Schuster and cash. Fletcher, 23, will lead the NL in on-base percentage for three straight seasons (1940–1942) and be named a 1943 All-Star.
- June 21 – The New York Yankees announce Lou Gehrig's playing retirement based on the Mayo Clinic's findings; a misreading of the clinic's report results in the mistaken notion among press and public that he is suffering from poliomyelitis, rather than ALS.
- June 22
  - Dizzy Dean goes the distance and his defending-NL-champion Chicago Cubs win their fifth straight, downing the Boston Bees, 7–1, at Wrigley Field. Dean is now 4–0 (1.25) with four complete games in eight games (five starts) in 1939. The Cubs improve to 30–28, eight games behind the Cincinnati Reds.
  - Night baseball will come to Chicago's South Side later this season. White Sox owner J. Louis Comiskey approves the immediate installation of eight light towers in the 29-year-old stadium named for his father, founder of the franchise. The Pale Hose are poised to become the third AL franchise to adopt night ball, all in 1939.
- June 26
  - The New York Yankees play the first night game in franchise history and lose to the Philadelphia Athletics, 3–2, at Shibe Park. Cotton Pippen stifles the Yankees on four hits for the sixth-place Athletics before 33,074, Shibe's biggest crowd of the season to date. Yankee Stadium will not install lights until 1946.
  - The Chicago Cubs purchase the contract of hard-swinging rookie outfielder Bill "Swish" Nicholson from Chattanooga of the Southern Association. Nicholson, 24, will become a four-time NL All-Star and lead the Senior Circuit in homers and RBI in both 1943 and 1944.
- June 27
  - In the first night game ever played in Cleveland, the 55,305 who throng to Municipal Stadium witness Bob Feller throw his second one-hitter of 1939, defeating the Detroit Tigers, 5–0. Ex-Indians star Earl Averill spoils the no-hitter with his sixth-inning single; Feller walks six and strikes out 13.
  - At light-less National League Park, the year's longest game by innings is halted by darkness after 23 frames (and five hours, 15 minutes) with the host Boston Bees knotted up with the visiting Brooklyn Dodgers, 2–2. Brooklyn starter Whit Wyatt goes 16 innings, hurling scoreless ball over the last 14. Statistics count, but the tie game—already the Dodgers' fourth deadlock of the season—will be replayed in its entirety at a later date.
- June 28
  - The New York Yankees humble the Philadelphia Athletics, 23–2 and 10–0, in a Shibe Park doubleheader. In the first game, the Bombers slug eight home runs, and follow that with five more in the second. Their 13 blasts and 53 total bases set a record for a doubleheader. Their 23 runs set the standard for most in a single game by a team in 1939. Three Yanks—Babe Dahlgren, Bill Dickey and Joe DiMaggio—each hit three home runs on the day.
  - The double defeats are the last games Connie Mack will manage for the 1939 Athletics, currently 25–37 and in sixth place. The "Grand Old Man of Baseball," 76, is bedridden with a severe gallbladder attack in Boston tomorrow, hospitalized in Philadelphia, and sidelined for the duration of the season, with his son Earle taking the reins. The elder Mack will fully recover and return for a 40th year as the team's manager next spring.

=== July ===
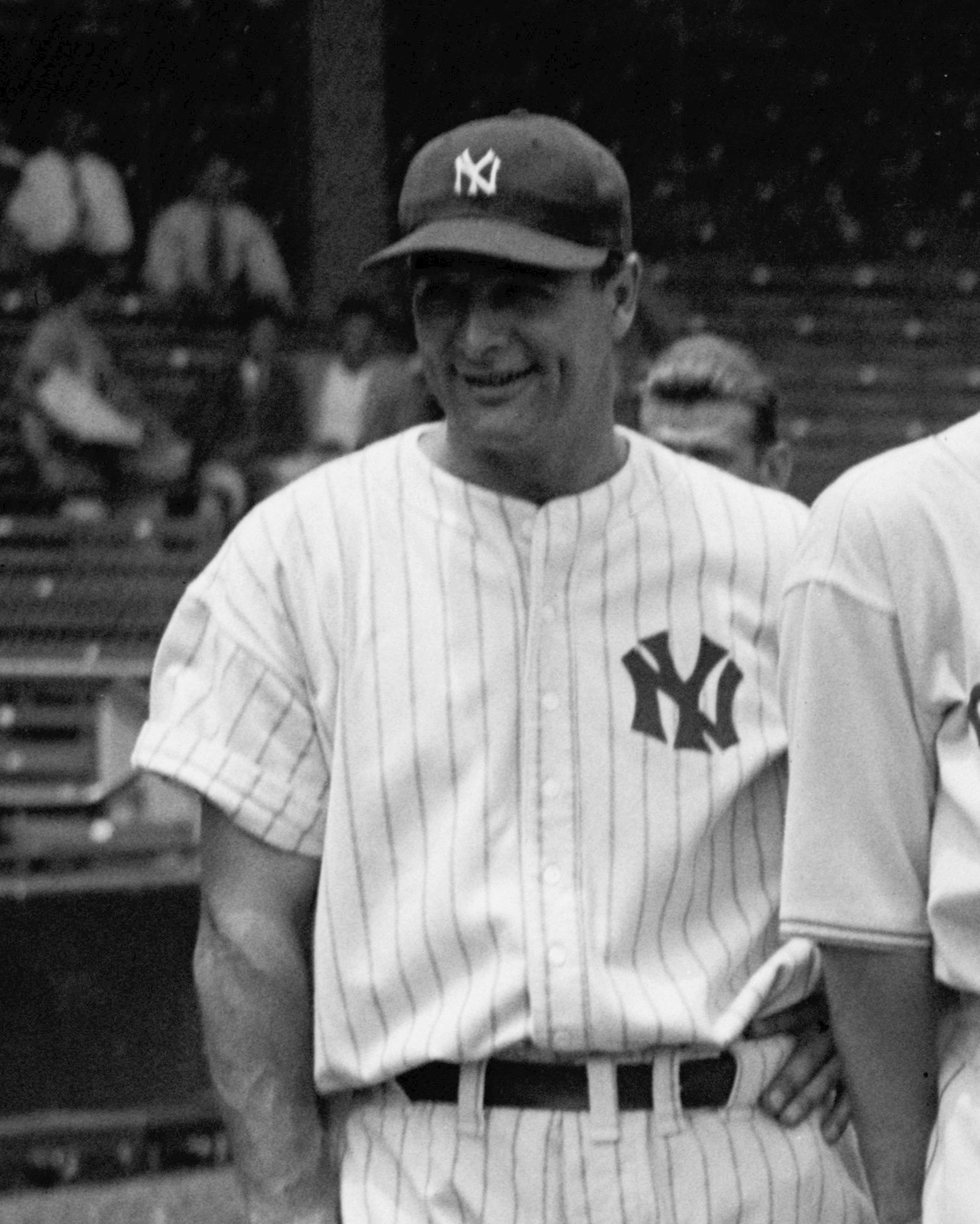
Lou Gehrig in 1937

- July 2
  - At Shibe Park, Casey Stengel, 48-year-old manager of the Boston Bees, exchanges punches with 28-year-old Philadelphia Phillies baserunner Pinky May in Boston's 9–7 victory after May's hard slide knocks down Stengel's shortstop, Eddie Miller, trying to break up a double play. Both Stengel and May are evicted from the game by umpire Dolly Stark; Stengel is fined $25 by the National League.
  - At the Polo Grounds, Leo Durocher, 160 lb (73 kg) shortstop–manager of the Brooklyn Dodgers, trades blows with the New York Giants' 200 lb (91 kg) Zeke Bonura after Durocher steps on Bonura's foot during a play at first base in the Giants' 6–4 victory. Both are given the gate by umpire Babe Pinelli. In all, six players, two managers, and one player–manager are ejected from today's 15 MLB games.
- July 3 – In the St. Louis Cardinals' 5–3 victory over the Chicago Cubs, Johnny Mize goes four-for-four—a double, triple and two home runs—equaling a National League record for extra-base hits in a nine-inning game.
- July 4
  - Two weeks after his retirement, Lou Gehrig Appreciation Day is celebrated before 61,808 fans between games of a doubleheader at Yankee Stadium.
    - Before the games begin, eight teammates from the famous "Murderers' Row" New York Yankees of 1927 and others from Gehrig's early career—Wally Pipp and previous "iron man" record-holder Everett Scott—visit him in an emotional clubhouse reunion.
    - Babe Ruth arrives during the opening game, and at the formal ceremony between contests, he hugs Gehrig, from whom he has been estranged since the early 1930s. Ruth then joins political figures and manager Joe McCarthy in paying homage to the stricken slugger. He's showered with gifts from the Yankees and former foes.
    - Deeply moved and reluctant to speak, Gehrig is encouraged to address the crowd by McCarthy and Ruth. He then delivers an unscripted, 277-word speech whose opening two sentences become immortal: "Fans, for the past two weeks you have been reading about a bad break. Yet today I consider myself the luckiest man on the face of the earth."
  - The Philadelphia Athletics, who surrendered 33 runs to the Yankees in a twin bill at Shibe Park last Sunday, cough up 35 in today's double bill against the visiting Boston Red Sox, who trounce them, 17–7 and 18–12. The Bosox rack up 35 hits as well; Jim Tabor hits four homers on the day, three of them (two of those grand slams) in the nightcap.
- July 8 – The Washington Senators' Mickey Vernon, who hails from nearby Marcus Hook, Pennsylvania, makes his major league debut as a pinch runner in the first game of a doubleheader at Shibe Park against the Philadelphia Athletics. In Game 2, the 21-year-old goes one-for-five and scores a run. By the time of Vernon's last game in 1960, he'll have become one of the few MLB players to appear in four different decades.
- July 9
  - The last-place Philadelphia Phillies defeat the host Boston Bees, 3–1, to snap an eleven-game losing streak; then, in the second game of today's doubleheader, the Phils win again, 7–6. The Phillies end the day 21–46–1, 21½ games out of first place, and 9½ lengths behind seventh-place Boston (32–38–1) in Senior Circuit.
  - The league leaders at the All-Star break, the informal half-way point of the baseball season, are the Cincinnati Reds (44–26), 5½ games in front of the New York Giants in the National League, and the New York Yankees (53–22), who lead the Boston Red Sox (43–25) by 6½ lengths in the American League.
- July 11 – In the first of four times that the All-Star Game will be held at the Yankee Stadium of 1923–2008, the American League defeats the National League, 3–1, behind pitchers Red Ruffing, Tommy Bridges and Bob Feller, and a home run by Joe DiMaggio. A crowd of 62,892 witnesses the seventh annual Midsummer Classic since its 1933 debut; the AL improves its record to 5–2.

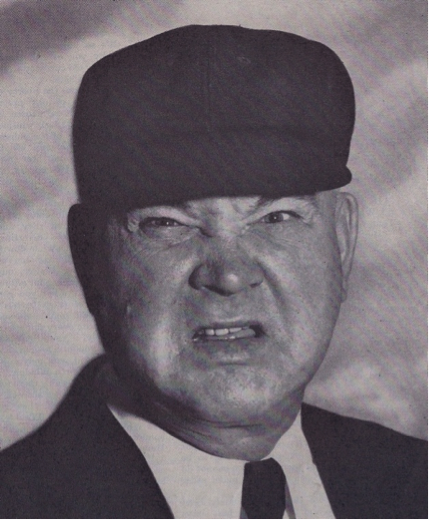
George Magerkurth

- July 15 – Protesting a "fair or foul" home run call at the Polo Grounds, New York Giants shortstop Billy Jurges trades punches with pugnacious NL umpire George Magerkurth; the blows are struck after each man charges the other with spitting on him. Both Jurges and Magerkurth are fined and suspended for ten days by the league office. The first-place Cincinnati Reds win the contest, 8–4, to widen their lead to 6½ games.
- July 16 – The Boston Red Sox sweep a doubleheader from the Detroit Tigers, 9–2 and 3–0, behind Lefty Grove and Denny Galehouse at Briggs Stadium that brings their winning streak to 12 games—with all of their victories coming on the road.
- July 18
  - The Brooklyn Dodgers acquire young shortstop Pee Wee Reese from the Red Sox' organization for $35,000 and two players to be named later: pitcher Red Evans and outfielder Art Parks. Currently toiling for the Bosox' Louisville farm team, Reese, 20, will report to the Dodgers in 1940 to begin his Hall-of-Fame career. Reportedly, Boston's incumbent shortstop and player–manager—another Hall of Famer, Joe Cronin, 32—makes the deal because he doesn't want to change positions to make room for Reese.
  - Chicago White Sox owner J. Louis Comiskey dies from heart disease at 53. His death triggers an ownership struggle between widow Grace Comiskey and the First National Bank of Chicago, executor of her late husband's estate.
- July 19 – Arky Vaughan is 1939's only NL player to hit for the cycle in a 10–3 victory for his Pittsburgh Pirates over the New York Giants at the Polo Grounds. The future Hall of Famer goes five-for-five and scores four runs, and his "cycle" is in reverse order: homer, triple, double, single and single.
- July 22 – Chuck Klein, future Hall-of-Fame slugger now slowly winding down his MLB career, extends his hitting streak to 21 straight games, longest in MLB during 1939, in the Pirates' 9–3 triumph over the host Boston Bees. Klein hits .412 during the skein, with 35 hits—with 14 of them for extra bases; the Pirates go 14–7 and climb into the NL's first division.
- July 24 – The Brooklyn Dodgers claim journeyman American League outfielder Dixie Walker on waivers from the Detroit Tigers. Walker, 28, has been slowed by injuries since breaking in with the 1931 Yankees and is hitting .308 in 43 games for the 1939 Tigers. After taking over as the Dodgers' centerfielder in August, Walker will become one of Brooklyn's most popular players, making four NL All-Star teams and winning a batting title (.357 in 1944) and RBI crown (124 in 1945) over his next eight full seasons.
- July 25 – New York Yankees pitcher Atley Donald, 28, sets an AL record for consecutive wins by a rookie, bringing his record to 12–0 with a 5–1 victory over the St. Louis Browns. He ties Hooks Wiltse of the 1904 New York Giants for the MLB mark.
- July 26
  - The Cuban Baseball Hall of Fame inducts its charter honorees, including José Méndez and Cristóbal Torriente, who will be voted into Cooperstown in 2006.
  - The Yankees tie a major league record by scoring in every inning. Bill Dickey belts three home runs in the 14–1 win over the Browns. The Bombers also are 14–1 against St. Louis in head-to-head play so far in 1939.
- July 28 – The Pittsburgh Pirates trade first baseman Gus Suhr, current NL record-holder for consecutive games played (822, between September 11, 1931 and June 4, 1937), to the Philadelphia Phillies for pitcher Max Butcher.

=== August ===
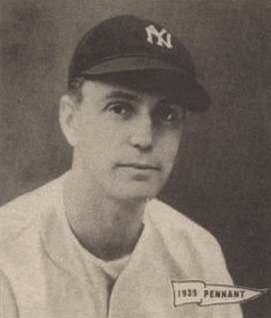
Babe Dahlgren

- August 1 – Temperamental Joe Medwick, the St. Louis Cardinals' slugger and future Hall of Famer, throws a tantrum before a sparse gathering of 1,453 at Sportsman's Park when manager Ray Blades, a disciplinarian, removes him from left field for a defensive replacement with two out in the top of the ninth inning. Medwick fires his glove into the air, kicks it, then storms off the diamond. He's recently been fined for failing to hustle. The Cardinals hold on to beat the Boston Bees, 4–3.
- August 2 – The St. Louis Browns reacquire outfielder Moose Solters, 33, via waivers from the Cleveland Indians. In his previous two-year stint with the Browns (1935–1936), Solters had driven in 238 runs in 279 games.
- August 5 – The Cincinnati Reds obtain outfielder Vince DiMaggio from the New York Yankees for $40,000 and two players to be named later: outfielders Frenchy Bordagaray and Nino Bongiovanni, who are added to the deal in January 1940. DiMaggio, 26, has spent the summer with the Yanks' Kansas City Blues farm club and hasn't appeared in an official varsity game as a teammate of his superstar younger brother, Joe. The Reds don't recall Vince until after September 1, making him ineligible for the 1939 World Series, where the brothers could have faced each other; Bordagaray and Bongiovanni, on the other hand, do appear for Cincinnati in the coming Fall Classic in pinch-hitting and pinch-running roles.
- August 6
  - With his Boston Red Sox already trailing 10–1 to the Detroit Tigers, manager Joe Cronin sends slugger Jimmie Foxx to Fenway Park's mound to pitch the ninth inning—and he sets Detroit down, 1–2–3, fanning former teammate Pinky Higgins. It's Foxx's first turn as an MLB pitcher, but he'll hurl in nine more games in his final season as a member of the 1945 Philadelphia Phillies.
  - In the Negro leagues' East–West All Star Game, Ted Radcliffe leads the West to a 4–2 win. Neil Robinson and Ted Strong homer for the victors. The game is played at Comiskey Park before a reported attendance of 40,000 fans.
- August 9
  - Red Rolfe of the New York Yankees starts a streak of 18 consecutive games in which he scores at least one run. He'll tally 30 total runs during the streak, which lasts through August 25.
  - With a 5–3 victory over the Pittsburgh Pirates, the St. Louis Cardinals complete a ten-game winning streak to move eight games behind the NL-leading Cincinnati Reds. By August 20, after going 4–1–1 in two head-to-head series against the Reds, the Cardinals will narrow Cincinnati's margin to only 3½ games.
- August 13
  - Rookie Ted Williams goes six-for-six with three bases on balls in nine plate appearances in a Fenway Park doubleheader; his second-place Boston Red Sox split the twin bill with the Washington Senators.
  - In Philadelphia, the team the Bosox are chasing, the New York Yankees, shut out the Athletics, 21–0, in the second game of their doubleheader that's halted after eight innings by a Sunday curfew. Joe DiMaggio and Babe Dahlgren each slug two homers; hurler Red Ruffing not only blanks the Mackmen on three hits for his 17th win of 1939, he goes four-for-six (all singles) at the plate, with three runs batted in.
- August 14 – Comiskey Park joins the "Charge of the Lights Brigade" when the Chicago White Sox host the Windy City's first MLB night game and defeat the St. Louis Browns, 5–2, before an official crowd of exactly 30,000 fans.
- August 19 – The Cincinnati Reds shuffle their pitching staff, acquiring left-hander Milt Shoffner from the Boston Bees on waivers and selling the contract of righty Peaches Davis to the Chicago Cubs. The Reds currently hold a 5½-game advantage in the NL race.
- August 20 – The Pittsburgh Pirates and Chicago Cubs split a doubleheader at Forbes Field. The Bucs' 5–0 victory in the second game snaps a 12-game losing streak.
- August 22 – Behind five home runs, the New York Yankees register the first night-game victory in franchise history, defeating the Chicago White Sox, 14–5, before 50,000 at Comiskey Park.
- August 23 – Pep Young's infield single is the only safety allowed by the Boston Bees' Bill Posedel in the right-hander's 1–0 triumph over the visiting Pittsburgh Pirates. The Bees are also held off the scoresheet until the home half of the eighth, when Tony Cuccinello's RBI single scores Jimmy Outlaw. Posedel racks up the fifth and final one-hitter in MLB's 1939 season, third by a National Leaguer, and second by a Boston hurler (after Lou Fette's 5–0 win on June 18).
- August 26 – The first MLB game to be televised occurs, when NBC-operated experimental station W2XBS broadcasts a doubleheader between the Cincinnati Reds and the Brooklyn Dodgers from Ebbets Field. Red Barber serves as play-by-play announcer. Television is one of the technological breakthroughs exhibited at the 1939 New York World's Fair, held near the site of today's Citi Field in neighboring Queens.

=== September ===
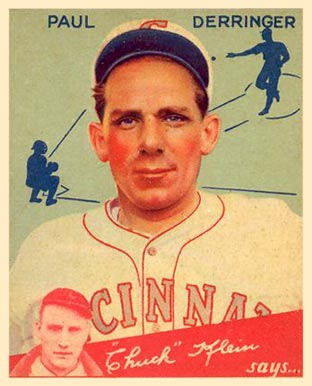
Paul Derringer

- September 3 – With a Sunday evening, 6:30 p.m. curfew looming—and his Boston Red Sox suddenly trailing the visiting New York Yankees, 7–5, in the top of the eighth inning—Red Sox manager Joe Cronin's "stalling" tactics, and Fenway Park fans' showering the field with debris, result in umpiring crew chief Cal Hubbard declaring a Boston forfeit and an apparent New York victory. But league president Will Harridge will uphold Cronin's protest of the forfeiture; the score will revert to the previous full inning with the teams deadlocked at 5–5, and the contest goes into the record books as a tie.
- September 4 – Labor Day action marks the beginning of 1939's "stretch run."
  - In the National League, Billy Werber's ninth-inning RBI single scores Eddie Joost with the tying run, and enables the first-place Cincinnati Reds to avoid a doubleheader sweep at the hands of their onrushing pursuers, the St. Louis Cardinals, at Sportsman's Park. The 6–6 deadlock, to be replayed from scratch tomorrow, leaves Cincinnati (74–47–2) four games ahead of St. Louis (71–52–2).
  - In the American League, the Yankees (90–38–1) add two more games to their lead—which now stands at 13½ lengths—by taking two games from the Philadelphia Athletics, while the second-place Red Sox drop both ends of their twin bill to the Washington Senators.
- September 13 – Nineteen-year-old right-hander Early Wynn of the Washington Senators loses his major league debut, 4–2, to the Chicago White Sox. Two decades from now, the future Hall of Famer will lead the 1959 White Sox to a pennant and win the Cy Young Award.
- September 16 – The New York Yankees clinch their fourth straight AL pennant and their 11th in the last 19 years, defeating the Detroit Tigers, 8–5, behind rookie southpaw Marius Russo and five RBI from Red Rolfe. The Bombers' league lead stands at 17 full games.
- September 18 – The St. Louis Browns lose their 100th game of the season, 6–2 to the Yankees; tomorrow, the Yankees will down the Chicago White Sox, 6–2, for their 100th victory of the season.
- September 23 – The Brooklyn Dodgers lash 27 hits, most by an NL team in one game this season, and defeat the Philadelphia Phillies, 22–4; in seven plate appearances, Brooklyn's Cookie Lavagetto has six hits and one base on balls; he scores four runs. After they sweep their Shibe Park doubleheader on the 24th, the Dodgers hand the Phils losses number 100 and 101.
- September 24 – By a 2–0 score, the Baltimore Elite Giants, who finished only 22–25 during the Negro National League season, upset the Homestead Grays, whose 32–18–1 record was best during the regular campaign, in the championship match of the NNL playoffs to win the Jacob Ruppert Trophy before 10,000 at Yankee Stadium.
- September 28
  - At Crosley Field, Paul Derringer wins his 25th game and knocks in the winning run with a sacrifice fly to lead his Cincinnati Reds to a 5–3 win over their closest pursuer, the St. Louis Cardinals, and capture the Reds' second-ever NL championship and first since 1919. Cincinnati skipper Bill McKechnie becomes the first MLB manager to win pennants with three different clubs (he had helmed the 1925 Pirates and 1928 Cardinals).
  - Pie Traynor, who has spent his MLB career with the Pittsburgh Pirates, including 18 years as their Hall-of-Fame third baseman, resigns from the managing post he's held since June 19, 1934. The Pirates are in the midst of a nine-game losing streak when Traynor announces his pending departure. Frankie Frisch, retired standout second baseman who spent this season as the radio voice of the Boston Bees and Red Sox, is reported to already have lined up the Bucs' 1940 managerial post. Frisch formerly piloted the Cardinals from July 25, 1933 through September 11, 1938, and captured the 1934 World Series title at the wheel of the Gashouse Gang.
- September 29 – The second game of the doubleheader between the Cleveland Indians and Detroit Tigers at Briggs Stadium is called after five innings due to rain. Hal Newhouser pitches all five innings for Detroit, and is the losing pitcher in his major league debut.
- September 30
  - In the nightcap of a Saturday doubleheader, and what will be the last game of the Boston Red Sox' season, Ted Williams drills a home run into Yankee Stadium's right-field seats to complete the freshman batting phenom's achievement of homering in every American League ballpark. The solo shot is the 31st of the year for "the Kid" (third in the AL and second-most by a rookie in MLB history) and knocks in his league-leading 145th RBI.
  - Pitcher Murry Dickson of the St. Louis Cardinals makes his big-league debut in the second game of a twin bill against the Chicago Cubs at Wrigley Field, and hurls 32/3 innings without giving up a run. Although interrupted by World War II service, Dickson's MLB career will extend for 18 years and end almost 20 years from today.

=== October ===
Charlie Keller

- October 4 – Rookie Charlie Keller's triple and Bill Dickey's RBI single break a one-all deadlock in the bottom of the ninth and win Game 1 of the 1939 World Series for the host New York Yankees, 2–1, over the Cincinnati Reds. Red Ruffing limits Cincinnati to four hits and Paul Derringer is the hard-luck loser.
- October 5 – Holding the Reds hitless over 71/3 innings—and just two knocks overall—Monte Pearson fires a 4–0 shutout win and the Yankees take Game 2 of the 1939 World Series. Babe Dahlgren doubles and homers and tallies two of the Yankees' runs.
- October 7 – In Game 3, Cincinnati takes a 3–2 lead in the home half of the second inning only to have Joe DiMaggio hit a two-run home run in the top of the third, to put the Yankees on top for good on their way to a 7–3 victory. Charlie Keller slugs a pair of two-run homers, and Bill Dickey adds a solo blow. Bump Hadley gains the win in relief of an injured Lefty Gomez.
- October 8 – Winning their record fourth successive World Series (their eighth since 1923), and sweeping their second straight Fall Classic, the New York Yankees defeat the Cincinnati Reds, 7–4, in Game 4 of the World Series.
  - The Reds enter the ninth inning with a 4–2 lead, but an error by Billy Myers allows the Bombers to tie the contest, 4–4. Then, in the tenth, three costly miscues (by Myers, Ival Goodman and Ernie Lombardi) lead to three New York tallies—and doom the Reds' cause. Lombardi's error comes when, temporarily stunned by Charlie Keller's hard slide into him at home plate, he drops the ball to allow Keller and, behind him, Joe DiMaggio to score insurance runs.
- October 18 – Ex-third baseman Bucky Walters, converted to the pitching mound just four seasons ago, is the runaway winner of 1939's National League Most Valuable Player Award, receiving 18 of 24 first-place votes and 303 points from BBWAA electors. The Cincinnati Reds' ace garnered the NL's "pitching Triple Crown," leading in games won (27), earned run average (2.29) and strikeouts (137), as well as complete games (31) and innings pitched (319). Slugger Johnny Mize, who led in homers (28) and batting average (.349), finishes second (178 points), edging Walters' teammate and fellow hurler, Paul Derringer (174 points).
- October 20 – The highest-ranking Canadian teams in "Organized Baseball," the Montreal Royals and Toronto Maple Leafs, assure the directors of the International League that they will operate in 1940. Canada's Parliament declared war on Nazi Germany in September after the Invasion of Poland, which touches off what will become World War II in Europe.
- October 24 – Despite missing 32 early-season games due to a severe leg injury, Joe DiMaggio wins the first of his three career American League Most Valuable Player Awards. The 25-year-old centerfielder of the world-champion New York Yankees takes 15 of 24 first-place BBWAA votes; his two nearest challengers are Jimmie Foxx (170 points) and Bob Feller (155). DiMaggio led the AL in batting average (.381) in 1939, and made his fourth straight All-Star team.
- October 25 – Larry MacPhail, president/general manager of the Brooklyn Dodgers, proposes seven annual post-season inter-league series matching non-pennant-winning clubs from the National and American circuits by their places in the final standings, to determine a true measure of league superiority. MacPhail claims the New York Yankees' dominance of the AL (409 regular-season wins, and an average pennant margin of 14¾ games, since 1936) and World Series (a 16–3 record and four titles in the same span) is not a true measure of the National League's strength. Other owners dismiss MacPhail's idea. "Who'd want to watch the Browns and Phillies in a series?" argues Horace Stoneham of the New York Giants.
- October 27 – The Pittsburgh Pirates purchase the contract of catcher Spud Davis from the Phillies. Davis, 34, played with and for Pittsburgh's new pilot, Frankie Frisch, as a member of the 1934 St. Louis Cardinals.

=== November ===
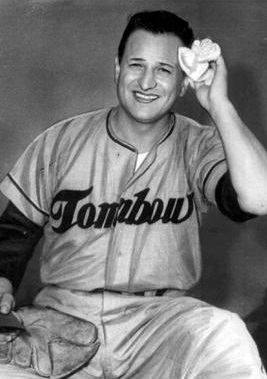
Victor Starffin in 1955

- November 4 – "Organized" minor league baseball signals its recovery from The Great Depression, with its 41 leagues reporting an all-time high of over 18.5 million in paid fan attendance for 1939, an increase of three million over 1938.
- November 8 – The government of strongman Anastasio Somoza García announces it will create a national baseball league for Nicaragua, where an estimated 300 baseball teams have already been formed. Somoza also hails mayor Fiorello LaGuardia for presenting him with baseball equipment as a gift during his recent visit to New York City.
- November 12
  - Dom DiMaggio, 22, the youngest of the three DiMaggio brothers and this year's Pacific Coast League MVP, is acquired for $40,000 by the Boston Red Sox from the San Francisco Seals. DiMaggio will spend his entire major jeague career with the Red Sox, hitting .298 in 1,399 games and making seven All-Star teams.
  - Pitcher Victor Starffin wins his 42nd game in a 96-game season of the Japanese Professional Baseball League, leading the Yomiuri Giants to the Championship title—setting a post-1900 world record for season victories that will be equaled by Kazuhisa Inao in 1961 but never broken. Starffin will follow his record performance with another 38 wins in 1940. Born in Russia in 1916, he moved to Asahikawa, Hokkaidō at a young age and was selected as part of Japan's national baseball team for an exhibition game against the United States in 1934. From 1936 through 1955, Starffin will win 303 games, to become the first pitcher in Japanese baseball history to reach 300 victories.
- November 14
  - The New York Giants announce they will bring night baseball to the Polo Grounds in 1940; eight towers, providing 200 million candlepower of electric light, will be erected in the 28-year-old stadium, and seven night games will appear on the club's home schedule.
  - A new venture, the "National Professional Indoor Baseball League," headed by Hall of Famer Tris Speaker, is launched at a Manhattan news conference. The loop will feature ten teams in seven MLB cities, playing a 102-game schedule in small indoor venues. Poor attendance and critical news coverage will cause the league's demise on December 22.
- November 29 – Commissioner of Baseball Kenesaw Mountain Landis fines the Brooklyn Dodgers, Detroit Tigers and a St. Louis Cardinals' minor league club, the Columbus Red Birds, for the "evil practice" of hiding player contracts by never filing them with minor-league officials. Landis also frees seven farm hands.

=== December ===
- December 1 – On the eve of the annual winter meetings, New York Yankees president Ed Barrow says he will urge "automating" the process of awarding intentional walks, long debated by baseball observers, by allowing the defensive team to notify the home plate umpire to award the batter first base, rather than by throwing four wide pitches. The "IBB" rule will not be changed until 2017.
- December 6
  - In a trade of aging, hard-nosed shortstops, the Chicago Cubs acquire Billy Rogell, 35, from the Detroit Tigers for Dick "Rowdy Richard" Bartell, 32. A member of the 1935 world-champion Tigers who injured his arm playing handball in 1938, Rogell will hit just .136 in 1940 before hanging up his spikes. Although he'll bat only .233 in 139 games in 1940, Bartell, a former New York Giants star who'd played just one season as a Cub, will be the starting shortstop for a pennant-winning Detroit outfit next season.
  - The Boston Bees make two trades, acquiring knuckleballer Jim Tobin from the Pittsburgh Pirates for right-hander Johnny Lanning, and sending former 20-game-winner Jim "Milkman" Turner to the National League-champion Cincinnati Reds for first baseman Les Scarsella. The Bees also receive cash payments in each transaction.
- December 7
  - At its winter conclave, the Baseball Writers' Association of America unanimously votes to break with its waiting-period eligibility custom, and immediately inducts Lou Gehrig into the Hall of Fame. Gehrig, 36, is elected only 221 days after his playing career ends due to the onset of ALS.
  - American League owners institute the so-called "Yankee rule," prohibiting its pennant-winner from acquiring a player from another AL team unless he is exposed to waivers that make him available to other league clubs. The one-year restriction, advocated by Clark Griffith, owner of the Washington Senators, is meant to curb the Bombers' dominance of the Junior Circuit. It's adopted unanimously—with the Yankees themselves also voting in favor.
- December 8
  - The Chicago White Sox shake up their outfield with two deals. In one, they acquire Moose Solters from the St. Louis Browns for Rip Radcliff, and in the second, they obtain Pete Appleton and Taffy Wright from the Washington Senators for Gee Walker. Appleton is a right-handed pitcher; all others in the two trades are outfielders.
  - The Pirates and Bees combine for another deal, when Pittsburgh sends pitcher Bill Swift and cash to Boston for fellow righty Danny MacFayden.
  - The Brooklyn Dodgers obtain former two-time NL All-Star catcher Gus Mancuso, along with hurler Newt Kimball, from the Chicago Cubs for catcher Al Todd.
  - The Boston Red Sox purchase the contract of veteran third baseman Marv Owen from the White Sox.
  - After a seven-year absence, "prodigal son" Al Simmons returns to the Philadelphia Athletics as a free agent. The Hall-of-Fame slugger, who starred on three pennant-winning and two World Series-champion Athletics teams between 1929 and 1931, is now 37; he had spent 1939 with Boston and Cincinnati of the National League.
- December 9 – The Tigers trade second baseman Benny McCoy and pitcher George Coffman to the Athletics for outfielder Wally Moses. Commissioner Kenesaw Mountain Landis will void the trade in five weeks, declaring McCoy a free agent because of the Tigers' widespread illegal manipulation of player contracts in their farm system.
- December 29 – Capping a busy month, the Chicago White Sox sell the contracts of catcher Norm Schlueter and outfielder Hank Steinbacher to the St. Louis Browns, then send catcher Tony Rensa, second baseman Jesse Landrum and cash to Oklahoma City of the Texas League for infielder Don Kolloway.

== Births ==
=== January ===
- January 9 – Guido Grilli
- January 14:
  - Tim Talton
  - Sandy Valdespino
- January 21 – Norm Bass
- January 29 – Bobby Bolin

=== February ===
- February 7 – Frank Kreutzer
- February 8 – Harvey Branch
- February 11 – Willie Smith
- February 12:
  - Jim Lawrence
  - Jerry Walker
- February 18:
  - Jesse Hickman
  - Dal Maxvill
  - Bob Miller
- February 19:
  - Jackie Moore
  - Jim Weaver
- February 25 – Denny Lemaster

=== March ===
- March 4 – Jack Fisher
- March 6 – Cookie Rojas
- March 8 – Jim Bouton
- March 10 – Bill Heath
- March 12 – Johnny Callison
- March 13 – Al Luplow
- March 21 – Tommy Davis
- March 23 – Bobby Dews
- March 26 – Al Neiger

=== April ===
- April 1:
  - Phil Niekro
  - Nick Peters
- April 3 – Hawk Taylor
- April 16 – Bernie Allen
- April 18 – Von McDaniel
- April 19 – Gustavo Gil
- April 23 – Chico Fernández
- April 30 – Bob Hendley

=== May ===
- May 2 – Gates Brown
- May 6 – Russ Gibson
- May 9 – Herb Hippauf
- May 11:
  - Héctor Martínez
  - Milt Pappas
  - Frank Quilici
- May 17 – Dick Smith
- May 24 – Jim Duckworth
- May 25 – Gene Budig

=== June ===
- June 4 – Phil Linz
- June 9
  - Doug Clemens
  - Julio Gotay
- June 11 – Jimmy Stewart
- June 15 – Ty Cline
- June 18 – Lou Brock

=== July ===
- July 8 – Ed Keegan
- July 15 – Mike Shannon
- July 25 – Santiago Rosario
- July 31 – Vic Davalillo

=== August ===
- August 4:
  - Dennis Higgins
  - Bob Meyer
- August 5 – Tommie Aaron
- August 9 – Claude Osteen
- August 10:
  - Johnny Lewis
  - Charlie Shoemaker
- August 13 – Bill Stafford
- August 18 – Joe Azcue
- August 21 – Jim Beauchamp
- August 22 – Carl Yastrzemski
- August 24 – Rick Joseph
- August 25 – Dooley Womack
- August 29:
  - Dave Nicholson
  - Frank Zupo

=== September ===
- September 1 – Rico Carty
- September 13 – Tom Parsons
- September 17:
  - Carl Bouldin
  - Jim Woods
- September 22 – Stover McIlwain
- September 24 – Dick Nen
- September 28 – Bruce Froemming

=== October ===
- October 2 – Paul Doyle
- October 4 – Ted Davidson
- October 5 – Dennis Bennett
- October 6 – Jack Cullen
- October 7:
  - John O'Donoghue
  - Phil Ortega
- October 9 – Mike Hershberger
- October 15 – Lou Klimchock
- October 21 – Ted Uhlaender
- October 23 – George Williams
- October 25 – Pete Mikkelsen
- October 29 – Pete Richert
- October 31 – Ed Stroud

=== November ===
- November 13 – Wes Parker
- November 24 – Jim Northrup
- November 27 – Dave Giusti
- November 29:
  - Jim Derrington
  - Dick McAuliffe
  - Joe Reliford

=== December ===
- December 3:
  - Ed Connolly
  - Ron Stillwell
- December 10 – Bob Priddy
- December 18 – Zoilo Versalles
- December 22 – Al Ferrara
- December 25 – Chris Krug
- December 26 – John Braun

== Deaths ==
=== January ===
- January 7 – Bert Weeden, 56, pinch-hitter for the 1911 Boston Rustlers and also a catcher/manager in the minors during 17 seasons spanning 1903–1923.
- January 9 – Louis Pelouze, 75, outfielder for the St. Louis Maroons in the 1886 season.
- January 13 – Jacob Ruppert, 71, brewery magnate who was co-owner (1915–1923), then sole owner (1923 until his death), of the New York Yankees; acquired Babe Ruth (1919), built Yankee Stadium (1923), and oversaw creation of a "Bronx Bombers" dynasty that would win ten American League pennants and seven World Series titles between 1921 and 1938; elected posthumously to Baseball Hall of Fame (2013).
- January 18 – Cliff Heathcote, 40, outfielder who hit .275 with 42 home runs and 448 RBI for the St. Louis Cardinals, Chicago Cubs, Cincinnati Reds and Philadelphia Phillies over 15 seasons from 1918 to 1932, and a member of the Cubs club that won the National League pennant in 1929.
- January 25 – Abner Dalrymple, 81, outfielder who played from 1878 through 1891 for the Milwaukee Grays, Chicago White Stockings, Pittsburgh Alleghenys, and Milwaukee Brewers, and also a prolific hitter who, at the time of his retirement, had collected several titles in batting average, home runs, hits, and runs scored.
- January 28 – Bill Cristall, 63, Ukrainian born pitcher who played briefly for the Cleveland Blues in 1901.

=== February ===
- February 6 – Joe Crisp, 53, catcher who played from 1910 to 1911 for the St. Louis Browns.
- February 12 – George Fair, 83, second baseman who played briefly for the New York Mutuals in the 1876 season.
- February 22 – Frank Morrissey, 62, pitcher who played with the Boston Americans in 1901 and for the Chicago Orphans in 1902.

=== March ===
- March 2 – Alex McFarlan, 59, outfielder for the 1892 Louisville Colonels.
- March 8 – Scott Stratton, 69, pitcher for three teams from 1888 to 1895, primarily with the Louisville Colonels, who posted 34 wins in 1890 which included 15 straight victories, while leading the American Association in winning percentage and ERA in the same season.
- March 15 – Cal Broughton, 78, catcher who played for six different American Association and National League teams in part of four seasons spanning 1883–1888.
- March 16 – Sam Dungan, 72, right fielder who hit .301 for three teams in a span of five seasons from 1892 to 1901, while posting a very solid 3.14 walk-to-strikeout ratio (116-to-37) in 382 games.
- March 17 – William Burke, 73, pitcher/outfielder for the 1887 Detroit Wolverines of the National League.
- March 18 – Ralph Miller, 43, third baseman who played from 1920 to 1921 with the Philadelphia Phillies and for the Washington Senators in 1924.
- March 25 – Tiny Chaplin, 33, pitcher who played for the New York Giants and the Boston Bees in four seasons between 1928 and 1936.
- March 28 – Fred Goldsmith, 82, pitcher for four different teams between 1875 and 1884, who steadfastly claimed that he had first thrown the curveball in 1870, six years earlier than Candy Cummings, who gained credit for the development of the pitch.

=== April ===
- April 5 – Fred Curtis, 58, first baseman who played for the New York Highlanders in the 1905 season.
- April 27 – Chauncey Fisher, 67, pitcher for the Cleveland Spiders, Cincinnati Reds, Brooklyn Bridegrooms, New York Giants and St. Louis Cardinals in parts or all of 16 seasons from 1893 to 1901.

=== May ===
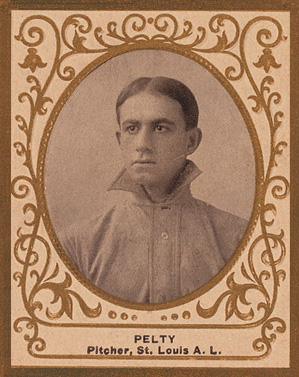
Barney Pelty

- May 16 – Hal Kime, 41, pitcher who played with the St. Louis Cardinals during the 1920 season.
- May 22 – Fred Link, 53, pitcher who played for the Cleveland Naps and the St. Louis Browns in the 1910 season.
- May 24 – Barney Pelty, 58, pitcher for the St. Louis Browns from 1903 to 1912, as well as one of the first Jewish players to play in the American League.
- May 29 – Bill McCarthy, 57, pitcher for the 1906 Boston Beaneaters.

=== June ===
- June 6 – Simmy Murch, 58, infielder who played for the St. Louis Cardinals and Brooklyn Superbas in part of three seasons spanning 1904–1908.
- June 8 – Pat Paige, 57, pitcher for the Cleveland Naps during the 1911 season.
- June 11 – John Henry, 75, outfielder/pitcher for the Cleveland Blues, Baltimore Orioles, Washington Nationals and New York Giants in a span of four seasons from 1884 to 1890.
- June 17 – Allen Sothoron, 46, spitball pitcher and a master of trick deliveries between the 1914 and 1926 seasons, who spent most of his career with the St. Louis Browns and the St. Louis Cardinals, and later coached and managed in the minors from 1928 to 1938.
- June 18 – Murphy Currie, 45, pitcher for the St. Louis Cardinals in 1916.
- June 25 – Heinie Smith, 67, second baseman for the Louisville Colonels, Pittsburgh Pirates, New York Giants and Detroit Tigers between 1897 and 1903, who also managed the Giants in the 1902 season.

=== July ===
- July 7 – Deacon White, 91, Hall of Fame catcher and third baseman who, despite playing without a glove, mask, chest protector and shin guards, caught more games (409) than any catcher during the 1870s and later became a member of the legendary Big Four infield with Dan Brouthers (1B), Hardy Richardson (2B) and Jack Rowe (SS), while being one of the game's most feared hitters – winning two batting titles (1875; 1877) and three RBI crowns (1873; 1876–1877) – as well as a major figure on five consecutive championship teams from 1873 through 1877.
- July 15 – Ed Biecher, 63, outfielder who played from 1897 to 1898 with the St. Louis Browns and Cleveland Spiders, and remained active as a player/manager in the Minor Leagues through 1903.
- July 18 – J. Louis Comiskey, 53, son of Charles Comiskey and owner of the Chicago White Sox from October 26, 1931 until his death.
- July 20 – Jack Reis, 48, pitcher who played briefly for the St. Louis Cardinals in the 1911 season.
- July 26 – Peaches Graham, 62, catcher who played for the Cleveland Bronchos, Chicago Cubs, Boston Doves/Rustlers and Philadelphia Phillies over seven seasons spanning 1902–1912.
- July 29 – John Sowders, 72, pitcher who played with the Indianapolis Hoosiers in 1887 and for the Kansas City Cowboys and Brooklyn Ward's Wonders from 1889 to 1890.

=== August ===
- August 12 – Jack Darragh, 73, first baseman for the 1891 Louisville Colonels of the National League.
- August 28 – Dave Oldfield, 74, catcher/outfielder who played with the Baltimore Orioles in 1883 and for the Brooklyn Grays and Washington Nationals from 1885 to 1886.

=== September ===
- September 17 – Tom Hart, 70, catcher/outfielder for the 1891 Washington Statesmen.
- September 18 – Toots Coyne, 44, third baseman who played for the Philadelphia Athletics during the 1914 season.
- September 25 – Frank LaPorte, 59, infielder who posted four .300 seasons in an eleven-year career, led the Federal League for the most RBI in 1914, and was the first man to play both for the New York Yankees and Boston Red Sox intense rivals.
- September 27 – Sweetbread Bailey, 44, pitcher who played from 1919 through 1921 for the Chicago Cubs and Brooklyn Robins, and also served in the military during World War I conflict.

=== October ===
- October 9 – Biff Schaller, 50, outfielder who played with the Detroit Tigers in 1911 and the Chicago White Sox in 1913.
- October 16 – Nick Allen, 51, catcher for the Buffalo Buffeds, Chicago Cubs and Cincinnati Reds in a span of six seasons from 1914 to 1920, who later played and managed in the minor leagues through 1936 and earned the nickname "Roarin' Nick" for his notorious altercations with umpires.
- October 17 – George Bristow, 69, outfielder for the 1899 Cleveland Spiders and later a long time player and manager in the minor leagues.
- October 19 – Red Downs, 56, second baseman for the Detroit Tigers, Brooklyn Dodgers and Chicago Cubs from 1907 through 1912, and also a member of the Tigers club that won the American League pennant in 1908, who gained notoriety later as an armed robber during the Great Depression.
- October 22 – Dale Williams, 84, pitcher for the Cincinnati Reds in the 1876 season.
- October 26 – Ed Lennox, 55, third baseman who played for the Philadelphia Athletics, Brooklyn Superbas, Chicago Cubs and Pittsburgh Rebels in parts of six seasons spanning 1906–1915.

=== November ===
- November 4 – Pete Henning, 51, pitcher who played for the Kansas City Packers in the 1914 and 1915 seasons.
- November 11 – Frank Abercrombie, 88, shortstop for the 1871 Philadelphia Athletics.
- November 15 – Tom Richardson, 56, pinch-hitter in one game for the St. Louis Browns of the American League.
- November 18 – Horace Helmbold, 72, pitcher for the Philadelphia Athletics of the American Association in 1890.
- November 19 – Frank Mountain, 79, pitcher for six different teams in seven seasons from 1880 to 1886, who won 20 games twice and hurled a no-hitter in 1884.
- November 26 – Frank Harris, 81, pitcher who played with the Altoona Mountain City of the Union Association in 1884.
- November 27 – Jack Fifield, 68, pitcher who played from 1897 through 1899 for the Philadelphia Phillies and Washington Senators of the National League.

=== December ===
- December 3 – Frank Killen, 69, pitcher for the Milwaukee Brewers, Washington Senators, Pittsburgh Pirates, Boston Beaneaters and Chicago Orphans, who won 164 games from 1891 to 1900, including two 30-win seasons and two 20-win seasons.
- December 11 – Dallas Bradshaw, 44, second baseman who played briefly for the Philadelphia Athletics in the 1917 season.
- December 18 – Heywood Broun, 51, sportswriter and editor in New York City since the early 1910s.
- December 26 – Clyde Engle, 55, valuable utility at all positions except pitcher and catcher for four teams from 1909 through 1916, who scored the tying run for the Boston Red Sox in the 10th inning of final Game 8 of the 1912 World Series after his earlier pop fly had been dropped, preserving the victory for the eventual champions Red Sox.
