= 1943 Philadelphia Phillies season =

Major League Baseball season

1943 Philadelphia Phillies
- League: National League
- Ballpark: Shibe Park
- City: Philadelphia
- Owners: William D. Cox
- Managers: Bucky Harris, Freddie Fitzsimmons
- Radio: WIBG (By Saam, Roy Neal)

The 1943 Philadelphia Phillies season was the 61st season in the history of the franchise.

Lumber baron William D. Cox purchased the team in 1943. On March 9, Cox announced that the team would officially be called the "Phillies" again after former-President Gerald Nugent had named them "Phils" prior to the 1942 season.

In 1943, the team rose out of the standings cellar for the first time in five years. The fans responded with an increase in attendance. Eventually, it was revealed by Cox that he had been betting on the Phillies, and he was banned from baseball.

== Offseason ==
=== Spring training ===
The Phillies opened spring training on March 18 in Hershey, Pennsylvania. They used the baseball diamond at Hershey High School.

=== Notable transactions ===
- March 24, 1943: Schoolboy Rowe was purchased by the Phillies from the Montreal Royals. Rowe compiled an impressive 14–8 record with a 2.94 ERA in 27 games. He finished 14th in the 1943 National League MVP voting, higher than any other player on the Phillies club (Babe Dahlgren was 29th).

== Regular season ==
=== Season standings ===
National League
Team	W	L	Pct.	GB	Home	Road
St. Louis Cardinals	105	49	.682	—	58‍–‍21	47‍–‍28
Cincinnati Reds	87	67	.565	18	48‍–‍29	39‍–‍38
Brooklyn Dodgers	81	72	.529	23½	46‍–‍31	35‍–‍41
Pittsburgh Pirates	80	74	.519	25	47‍–‍30	33‍–‍44
Chicago Cubs	74	79	.484	30½	36‍–‍38	38‍–‍41
Boston Braves	68	85	.444	36½	38‍–‍39	30‍–‍46
Philadelphia Phillies	64	90	.416	41	33‍–‍43	31‍–‍47
New York Giants	55	98	.359	49½	34‍–‍43	21‍–‍55

=== Record vs. opponents ===
1943 National League record Sources:
Team	BSN	BRO	CHC	CIN	NYG	PHI	PIT	STL
Boston	—	12–9	8–14	11–11	11–11	11–11	12–10	3–19
Brooklyn	9–12	—	10–12	13–9	14–8	17–5	11–11	7–15
Chicago	14–8	12–10	—	9–13	12–9–1	10–12	8–14	9–13
Cincinnati	11–11	9–13	13–9	—	16–6–1	19–3	9–13	10–12
New York	11–11	8–14	9–12–1	6–16–1	—	8–14–1	9–13	4–18
Philadelphia	11–11	5–17	12–10	3–19	14–8–1	—	10–12–1	9–13–1
Pittsburgh	10–12	11–11	14–8	13–9	13–9	12–10–1	—	7–15–2
St. Louis	19–3	15–7	13–9	12–10	18–4	13–9–1	15–7–2	—

=== Game log ===
Legend
	Phillies win
	Phillies loss
	Phillies tie
	Postponement
**Bold**	Phillies team member

1943 Game Log
Overall Record: 64–90–3
April (1–4)

#	Date	Opponent	Score	Win	Loss	Save	Attendance	Record
–	April 21	@ Braves	Postponed (inclement weather); Makeup: June 23 as a traditional double-header					
–	April 22	@ Braves	Postponed (inclement weather); Makeup: September 16 as a traditional double-header					
1	April 24	@ Dodgers	4–11	Bobo Newsom (1–0)	**Al Gerheauser** (0–1)	Les Webber (1)	3,821	0–1
2	April 25	@ Dodgers	3–2	**Jack Kraus** (1–0)	Curt Davis (0–1)	None	12,503	1–1
3	April 27	Dodgers	2–4	Whit Wyatt (1–0)	**Schoolboy Rowe** (0–1)	Les Webber (2)	4,291	1–2
4	April 28	Dodgers	3–4 (10)	Johnny Allen (1–0)	**Johnny Podgajny** (0–1)	None	2,470	1–3
5	April 29	Dodgers	3–4	Newt Kimball (1–0)	**Jack Kraus** (1–1)	Les Webber (3)	1,913	1–4
–	April 30	Braves	Postponed (inclement weather); Makeup: June 15 as a traditional double-header					

May (15–15)

#	Date	Opponent	Score	Win	Loss	Save	Attendance	Record
–	May 1	Braves	Postponed (inclement weather); Makeup: June 17 as a traditional double-header					
6	May 2 (1)	Braves	1–3	Nate Andrews (2–0)	**Si Johnson** (0–1)	None	see 2nd game	1–5
7	May 2 (2)	Braves	6–5 (12)	**Johnny Podgajny** (1–1)	Red Barrett (1–1)	None	12,942	2–5
8	May 3	@ Dodgers	3–5	Kirby Higbe (1–0)	**Al Gerheauser** (0–2)	None	3,391	2–6
9	May 4	@ Dodgers	3–1	**Jack Kraus** (2–1)	Rube Melton (0–1)	None	3,517	3–6
10	May 5	@ Dodgers	6–18	Max Macon (2–0)	**Charlie Fuchs** (0–1)	Newt Kimball (1)	4,465	3–7
11	May 6	@ Dodgers	3–2 (10)	**Johnny Podgajny** (2–1)	Bobo Newsom (2–1)	None	2,043	4–7
12	May 7	Giants	13–3	**Si Johnson** (1–1)	Ken Trinkle (1–2)	None	1,723	5–7
13	May 8	Giants	5–7	Ace Adams (1–0)	**Charlie Fuchs** (0–2)	Johnny Wittig (1)	1,908	5–8
14	May 9 (1)	Giants	3–2	**Schoolboy Rowe** (1–1)	Johnny Wittig (1–2)	None	see 2nd game	6–8
15	May 9 (2)	Giants	3–1	**Jack Kraus** (3–1)	Harry Feldman (0–2)	**Si Johnson** (1)	24,934	7–8
–	May 12	Reds	Postponed (inclement weather); Makeup: May 13 as a traditional double-header					
16	May 13 (1)	Reds	2–1	**Si Johnson** (2–1)	Ray Starr (1–3)	None	see 2nd game	8–8
17	May 13 (2)	Reds	1–3	Elmer Riddle (2–3)	**Johnny Podgajny** (2–2)	Clyde Shoun (1)	5,210	8–9
–	May 14	Reds	Postponed (inclement weather); Makeup: July 8 as a traditional double-header					
18	May 15	Cardinals	3–6	Mort Cooper (3–1)	**Charlie Fuchs** (0–3)	None	3,613	8–10
19	May 16 (1)	Cardinals	3–4 (11)	Howie Krist (1–0)	**Schoolboy Rowe** (1–2)	None	see 2nd game	8–11
20	May 16 (2)	Cardinals	2–1	**Al Gerheauser** (1–2)	Harry Gumbert (1–3)	None	30,823	9–11
21	May 17	Cubs	8–4	**Johnny Podgajny** (3–2)	Claude Passeau (1–2)	None	2,000	10–11
22	May 18	Cubs	5–4	**Si Johnson** (3–1)	Hiram Bithorn (3–4)	None	20,820	11–11
–	May 19	Cubs	Postponed (inclement weather); Makeup: May 20 as a traditional double-header					
23	May 20 (1)	Cubs	3–0	**Charlie Fuchs** (1–3)	Bill Lee (1–2)	None	see 2nd game	12–11
24	May 20 (2)	Cubs	2–0	**Al Gerheauser** (2–2)	Dick Barrett (0–3)	None	3,429	13–11
–	May 21	Pirates	Postponed (inclement weather); Makeup: July 1 as a traditional double-header					
25	May 22	Pirates	10–0	**Schoolboy Rowe** (2–2)	Bob Klinger (2–1)	None	11,692	14–11
26	May 23 (1)	Pirates	1–4	Rip Sewell (4–1)	**Johnny Podgajny** (3–3)	None	see 2nd game	14–12
27	May 23 (2)	Pirates	5–2	**Jack Kraus** (4–1)	Xavier Rescigno (1–3)	**Si Johnson** (2)	37,176	15–12
28	May 26	@ Reds	0–1	Bucky Walters (3–3)	**Charlie Fuchs** (1–4)	None	7,512	15–13
29	May 27	@ Reds	0–7	Elmer Riddle (3–3)	**Si Johnson** (3–2)	None	1,084	15–14
30	May 28	@ Reds	8–11	Clyde Shoun (1–1)	**Johnny Podgajny** (3–4)	None	1,542	15–15
31	May 29	@ Pirates	4–12	Xavier Rescigno (2–3)	**Al Gerheauser** (2–3)	None	1,727	15–16
32	May 30 (1)	@ Pirates	3–4	Rip Sewell (5–1)	**Schoolboy Rowe** (2–3)	None	see 2nd game	15–17
33	May 30 (2)	@ Pirates	1–2 (10)	Wally Hebert (3–2)	**Jack Kraus** (4–2)	None	7,297	15–18
34	May 31 (1)	@ Cubs	10–4	**Johnny Podgajny** (4–4)	Dick Barrett (0–4)	None	see 2nd game	16–18
35	May 31 (2)	@ Cubs	2–8	Ray Prim (1–1)	**Charlie Fuchs** (1–5)	Hank Wyse (2)	23,256	16–19

June (14–12–2)

#	Date	Opponent	Score	Win	Loss	Save	Attendance	Record
36	June 1	@ Cubs	7–2	**Si Johnson** (4–2)	Hiram Bithorn (4–6)	None	1,810	17–19
37	June 2	@ Cubs	6–5	**Schoolboy Rowe** (3–3)	Claude Passeau (3–3)	**Jack Kraus** (1)	2,652	18–19
38	June 3	@ Cardinals	2–8	Murry Dickson (3–0)	**Al Gerheauser** (2–4)	None	1,126	18–20
39	June 4	@ Cardinals	0–5	Mort Cooper (6–3)	**Charlie Fuchs** (1–6)	None	6,008	18–21
40	June 5	@ Cardinals	2–1^{^{[a]}}	**Jack Kraus** (5–2)	Howie Krist (2–1)	None	1,678	19–21
41	June 6 (1)	@ Cardinals	1–1 (5)^{^{[b]}}	None	None	None		19–21–1
–	June 6 (2)	@ Cardinals	Postponed (inclement weather); Makeup: July 27 as a traditional double-header					
–	June 9	@ Giants	Postponed (inclement weather); Makeup: June 12 as a traditional double-header					
42	June 12 (1)	@ Giants	3–2	**Schoolboy Rowe** (4–3)	Bill Lohrman (4–5)	**Newt Kimball** (2)	see 2nd game	20–21–1
43	June 12 (2)	@ Giants	4–3	**Al Gerheauser** (3–4)	Johnny Wittig (3–6)	**Charlie Fuchs** (1)	9,802	21–21–1
44	June 13 (1)	@ Giants	2–6	Carl Hubbell (2–0)	**Si Johnson** (4–3)	None	see 2nd game	21–22–1
45	June 13 (2)	@ Giants	3–4 (10)^{^{[c]}}	Rube Fischer (1–0)	**Newt Kimball** (1–2)	None	16,129	21–23–1
46	June 15 (1)	Braves	6–4	**Charlie Fuchs** (2–6)	Red Barrett (3–5)	None	see 2nd game	22–23–1
47	June 15 (2)	Braves	2–1	**Al Gerheauser** (4–4)	Dave Odom (0–1)	None	6,679	23–23–1
48	June 16	Braves	2–0	**Si Johnson** (5–3)	Jim Tobin (4–4)	None	9,802	24–23–1
49	June 17 (1)	Braves	0–2	Manny Salvo (1–2)	**Jack Kraus** (5–3)	None	6,000	24–24–1
50	June 17 (2)	Braves	7–2	**Newt Kimball** (2–2)	Nate Andrews (5–6)	None	7,379	25–24–1
51	June 18	@ Dodgers	10–8	**Dutch Dietz** (1–3)	Curt Davis (1–4)	None	3,654	26–24–1
52	June 19	@ Dodgers	5–7	Freddie Fitzsimmons (3–1)	**Charlie Fuchs** (2–7)	Les Webber (7)	8,618	26–25–1
53	June 20 (1)	@ Braves	13–7	**Si Johnson** (6–3)	Nate Andrews (5–7)	**Dutch Dietz** (1)	see 2nd game	27–25–1
54	June 20 (2)	@ Braves	7–0	**Schoolboy Rowe** (5–3)	Jim Tobin (4–5)	None	16,994	28–25–1
55	June 22	@ Braves	6–7	Manny Salvo (2–2)	**Jack Kraus** (5–4)	Dave Odom (1)	1,636	28–26–1
56	June 23 (1)	@ Braves	0–1	Red Barrett (4–6)	**Newt Kimball** (2–3)	None	see 2nd game	28–27–1
57	June 23 (2)	@ Braves	3–4 (11)	Al Javery (7–4)	**Al Gerheauser** (4–5)	None	4,560	28–28–1
58	June 24	@ Braves	12–5	**Si Johnson** (7–3)	Dave Odom (0–2)	None	1,585	29–28–1
59	June 25	Dodgers	8–2	**Schoolboy Rowe** (6–3)	Bobo Newsom (7–3)	None	21,504	30–28–1
60	June 26	Dodgers	2–3	Kirby Higbe (4–3)	**Jack Kraus** (5–5)	Ed Head (2)	7,688	30–29–1
61	June 27 (1)	Dodgers	4–9	Ed Head (5–3)	**Jack Kraus** (5–6)	None	see 2nd game	30–30–1
62	June 27 (2)	Dodgers	0–6	Rube Melton (4–4)	**Al Gerheauser** (4–6)	None	27,866	30–31–1
63	June 30	Pirates	3–3 (11)^{^{[d]}}	None	None	None	10,655	30–31–2

July (11–24)

#	Date	Opponent	Score	Win	Loss	Save	Attendance	Record
64	July 1 (1)	Pirates	6–1	**Schoolboy Rowe** (7–3)	Johnny Podgajny (4–7)	None	see 2nd game	31–31–2
65	July 1 (2)	Pirates	1–2	Bob Klinger (5–1)	**Al Gerheauser** (4–7)	None	6,884	31–32–2
66	July 2	Pirates	1–2	Rip Sewell (11–2)	**Jack Kraus** (5–7)	None	3,669	31–33–2
67	July 3	Cubs	1–6	Hank Wyse (1–3)	**Newt Kimball** (2–4)	None	3,984	31–34–2
68	July 4 (1)	Cubs	2–1	**Si Johnson** (8–3)	Hiram Bithorn (8–8)	None	see 2nd game	32–34–2
69	July 4 (2)	Cubs	2–5	Bill Lee (3–4)	**Dick Barrett** (0–5)	None	15,671	32–35–2
70	July 5 (1)	Cardinals	15–2	**Al Gerheauser** (5–7)	Murry Dickson (3–1)	None	see 2nd game	33–35–2
71	July 5 (2)	Cardinals	3–4	Howie Krist (6–2)	**Dutch Dietz** (1–4)	None	21,067	33–36–2
72	July 6	Cardinals	0–4	Harry Gumbert (6–4)	**Jack Kraus** (5–8)	None	3,915	33–37–2
–	July 7	Cardinals	Postponed (inclement weather); Makeup: August 18 as a traditional double-header					
73	July 8 (1)	Reds	5–7	Johnny Vander Meer (7–9)	**Dale Matthewson** (0–1)	None	see 2nd game	33–38–2
74	July 8 (2)	Reds	1–0 (14)	**Dick Barrett** (1–5)	Joe Beggs (2–3)	None	4,714	34–38–2
75	July 9	Reds	4–11	Clyde Shoun (5–2)	**Newt Kimball** (2–5)	None	8,286	34–39–2
76	July 10	Reds	2–6	Elmer Riddle (11–4)	**Dick Conger** (0–1)	None	3,808	34–40–2
77	July 11 (1)	Reds	4–7	Bucky Walters (4–9)	**Schoolboy Rowe** (7–4)	None	see 2nd game	34–41–2
78	July 11	Reds	2–14 (8)^{^{[e]}}	Ray Starr (8–7)	**Al Gerheauser** (5–8)	None	14,273	34–42–2
–	July 13	**1943 Major League Baseball All-Star Game at Shibe Park in Philadelphia**						
79	July 15	Giants	9–1	**Dick Barrett** (2–5)	Rube Fischer (4–3)	None	8,141	35–42–2
80	July 17 (1)^{^{[f]}}	Giants	2–1	**Dick Conger** (1–1)	Johnny Wittig (5–9)	None	see 2nd game	36–42–2
81	July 17 (2)^{^{[f]}}	Giants	7–8	Ace Adams (7–3)	**Dale Matthewson** (0–2)	Bill Lohrman (1)	11,074	36–43–2
82	July 18 (1)	Giants	6–10	Bill Lohrman (5–5)	**Newt Kimball** (2–6)	None	see 2nd game	36–44–2
83	July 18 (2)	Giants	2–3	Ken Chase (2–7)	**Andy Karl** (1–2)	None	14,589	36–45–2
84	July 20	@ Pirates	0–1	Rip Sewell (14–3)	**Dick Barrett** (2–6)	None	11,996	36–46–2
85	July 21	@ Pirates	2–10	Bob Klinger (7–3)	**Dick Conger** (1–2)	None	2,041	36–47–2
86	July 22 (1)	@ Pirates	3–0	**Schoolboy Rowe** (8–4)	Max Butcher (5–3)	None	see 2nd game	37–47–2
87	July 22 (2)	@ Pirates	9–6	**Jack Kraus** (6–8)	Hank Gornicki (3–8)	None	5,199	38–47–2
88	July 23	@ Pirates	2–3	Johnny Gee (1–0)	**Al Gerheauser** (5–9)	None	1,895	38–48–2
89	July 24	@ Reds	3–5	Clyde Shoun (6–3)	**Andy Karl** (1–3)	None	1,857	38–49–2
90	July 25 (1)	@ Reds	3–7	Elmer Riddle (13–5)	**Dick Conger** (1–3)	None	see 2nd game	38–50–2
91	July 25 (2)	@ Reds	3–1	**Dick Barrett** (3–6)	Ed Heusser (2–3)	None	10,346	39–50–2
92	July 26	@ Reds	2–8	Ray Starr (10–7)	**Jack Kraus** (6–9)	None	1,541	39–51–2
93	July 27 (1)	@ Cardinals	2–6	Murry Dickson (5–1)	**Al Gerheauser** (5–10)	None	see 2nd game	39–52–2
94	July 27 (2)	@ Cardinals	2–5	Howie Krist (7–3)	**Dick Conger** (1–4)	None	2,929	39–53–2
95	July 28	@ Cardinals	6–4	**Schoolboy Rowe** (9–4)	Red Munger (4–2)	**Dutch Dietz** (2)	17,883	40–53–2
96	July 29	@ Cardinals	5–13	Red Munger (5–2)	**Dick Barrett** (3–7)	None	1,676	40–54–2
97	July 30	@ Cardinals	3–2 (11)	**Al Gerheauser** (6–10)	Mort Cooper (14–6)	None	7,606	41–54–2
98	July 31	@ Cubs	1–3	Ed Hanyzewski (5–1)	**Dick Conger** (1–5)	None	6,238	41–55–2

August (13–15)

#	Date	Opponent	Score	Win	Loss	Save	Attendance	Record
99	August 1 (1)	@ Cubs	4–1	**Dick Barrett** (4–7)	Claude Passeau (10–7)	None	see 2nd game	42–55–2
100	August 1 (2)	@ Cubs	5–3	**Al Gerheauser** (7–10)	Hank Wyse (5–4)	None	34,086	43–55–2
–	August 3	@ Cubs	Postponed (inclement weather); Makeup: September 22 as a traditional double-header					
101	August 4	@ Pirates	2–6	Max Butcher (6–4)	**Al Gerheauser** (7–11)	None	10,417	43–56–2
102	August 6	@ Giants	7–4	**Dick Barrett** (5–7)	Ken Chase (2–10)	**Bill Lee** (1)	6,358	44–56–2
103	August 7	@ Giants	9–6	**Andy Karl** (2–3)	Johnny Wittig (5–12)	**Schoolboy Rowe** (1)	4,982	45–56–2
104	August 8 (1)	@ Giants	5–1	**Jack Kraus** (7–9)	Cliff Melton (5–7)	None	see 2nd game	46–56–2
105	August 8 (2)	@ Giants	8–2	**Al Gerheauser** (8–11)	Van Mungo (0–3)	**Dick Barrett** (1)	16,736	47–56–2
106	August 11 (1)	Pirates	2–1	**Schoolboy Rowe** (10–4)	Rip Sewell (17–5)	None	see 2nd game	48–56–2
107	August 11 (2)	Pirates	2–0	**Dick Barrett** (6–7)	Hank Gornicki (4–9)	None	11,129	49–56–2
108	August 12	Pirates	4–3	**Dick Conger** (2–5)	Xavier Rescigno (5–8)	**Newt Kimball** (3)	12,065	50–56–2
–	August 13	Pirates	Postponed (inclement weather); Makeup: August 14 as a traditional double-header					
109	August 14 (1)	Pirates	2–8	Bob Klinger (9–5)	**Jack Kraus** (7–10)	None	see 2nd game	50–57–2
110	August 14 (2)	Pirates	1–2	Max Butcher (7–4)	**Al Gerheauser** (8–12)	Hank Gornicki (2)	6,344	50–58–2
111	August 15 (1)	Cubs	2–5	Hiram Bithorn (15–9)	**Dick Barrett** (6–8)	None	see 2nd game	50–59–2
112	August 15 (2)	Cubs	0–3	Paul Derringer (7–10)	**Bill Lee** (3–8)	None	16,257	50–60–2
113	August 16	Cubs	4–3	**Schoolboy Rowe** (11–4)	Paul Erickson (0–2)	None	6,460	51–60–2
114	August 17	Cubs	5–7	Ray Prim (3–3)	**Dick Conger** (2–6)	Paul Derringer (3)	1,200	51–61–2
115	August 18 (1)	Cardinals	0–6	Howie Krist (8–4)	**Jack Kraus** (7–11)	None	see 2nd game	51–62–2
116	August 18 (2)	Cardinals	6–3	**Al Gerheauser** (9–12)	Red Munger (6–4)	None	16,514	52–62–2
117	August 19	Cardinals	6–5	**Dick Barrett** (7–8)	Max Lanier (9–6)	**Jack Kraus** (2)	13,733	53–62–2
118	August 20	Cardinals	1–5	Mort Cooper (17–7)	**Bill Lee** (3–9)	Howie Krist (3)	12,678	53–63–2
119	August 21	Cardinals	3–2	**Schoolboy Rowe** (12–4)	Harry Brecheen (5–4)	None	3,400	54–63–2
120	August 22 (1)	Reds	3–4	Elmer Riddle (16–8)	**Al Gerheauser** (9–13)	Clyde Shoun (5)	see 2nd game	54–64–2
121	August 22 (2)	Reds	6–20	Joe Beggs (4–3)	**Dick Conger** (2–7)	None	16,385	54–65–2
122	August 24	Reds	2–4	Clyde Shoun (11–3)	**Dick Barrett** (7–9)	None	8,756	54–66–2
123	August 28	Dodgers	7–14	Rex Barney (2–0)	**Al Gerheauser** (9–14)	Curt Davis (3)	4,464	54–67–2
124	August 29 (1)	Dodgers	1–3	Whit Wyatt (9–5)	**Dick Barrett** (7–10)	None	see 2nd game	54–68–2
125	August 29 (2)	Dodgers	0–8	Ed Head (7–8)	**Schoolboy Rowe** (12–5)	None	17,013	54–69–2
126	August 31	Dodgers	2–4	Kirby Higbe (9–10)	**Jack Kraus** (7–12)	None	9,428	54–70–2

September (8–20–1)

#	Date	Opponent	Score	Win	Loss	Save	Attendance	Record
127	September 2	Braves	2–3 (10)	Al Javery (14–12)	**Al Gerheauser** (9–15)	None	4,018	54–71–2
–	September 4	Braves	Postponed (inclement weather); Makeup: September 18 as a traditional double-header in Boston					
128	September 5 (1)	Braves	2–1	**Dick Barrett** (8–10)	Jim Tobin (12–10)	None	see 2nd game	55–71–2
129	September 5 (2)	Braves	5–1	**Schoolboy Rowe** (13–5)	Red Barrett (10–15)	**Bill Lee** (2)	8,175	56–71–2
130	September 6 (1)	@ Giants	3–6	Rube Fischer (5–7)	**Al Gerheauser** (9–16)	Ace Adams (9)	see 2nd game	56–72–2
131	September 6 (2)	@ Giants	3–1 (11)	**Jack Kraus** (8–12)	Ken Chase (3–15)	None	12,183	57–72–2
132	September 8	@ Giants	3–2	**Bill Lee** (4–9)	Cliff Melton (7–10)	None	1,157	58–72–2
133	September 9	@ Dodgers	6–7	Les Webber (2–1)	**Dick Barrett** (8–11)	None	4,825	58–73–2
134	September 11	@ Dodgers	2–7	Kirby Higbe (11–10)	**Schoolboy Rowe** (13–6)	Ed Head (6)	8,687	58–74–2
135	September 12	@ Dodgers	4–8	Curt Davis (10–9)	**Al Gerheauser** (9–17)	Les Webber (10)	13,722	58–75–2
136	September 14	Giants	4–4 (10)^{^{[g]}}	None	None	None	3,447	58–75–3
137	September 15 (1)	Giants	1–0	**Jack Kraus** (9–12)	Van Mungo (2–7)	None	see 2nd game	59–75–3
138	September 15 (2)	Giants	3–6	Hugh East (1–1)	**Bill Lee** (4–10)	Johnny Wittig (2)	903	59–76–3
139	September 16 (1)	@ Braves	9–2	**Schoolboy Rowe** (14–6)	Jim Tobin (12–12)	**Bill Lee** (3)	see 2nd game	60–76–3
140	September 16 (2)	@ Braves	0–8	Al Javery (15–14)	**Dale Matthewson** (0–3)	None	1,532	60–77–3
–	September 17	@ Braves	Postponed (inclement weather); Makeup: September 19 as a traditional double-header					
141	September 18 (1)	@ Braves	0–2	Nate Andrews (13–18)	**Al Gerheauser** (9–18)	None	see 2nd game	60–78–3
142	September 18 (2)	@ Braves	1–2	Red Barrett (12–16)	**Dick Barrett** (8–12)	None	1,650	60–79–3
143	September 19 (1)	@ Braves	2–3	Jim Tobin (13–12)	**Jack Kraus** (9–13)	None	see 2nd game	60–80–3
144	September 19 (2)	@ Braves	5–6 (14)	Al Javery (16–14)	**Newt Kimball** (2–7)	None	6,054	60–81–3
145	September 22 (1)	@ Cubs	1–5	Claude Passeau (15–11)	**Dick Barrett** (8–13)	None	see 2nd game	60–82–3
146	September 22 (2)	@ Cubs	3–0	**Al Gerheauser** (10–18)	Hiram Bithorn (17–12)	None	3,623	61–82–3
147	September 23	@ Cubs	7–8	Walter Signer (1–1)	**Schoolboy Rowe** (14–7)	John Burrows (2)	1,177	61–83–3
148	September 24	@ Cubs	4–7 (5)	Paul Derringer (9–14)	**Bill Lee** (4–11)	None	314	61–84–3
149	September 25	@ Cardinals	4–5	Red Munger (9–4)	**Jack Kraus** (9–14)	None	1,653	61–85–3
150	September 26 (1)	@ Cardinals	1–4	Howie Krist (10–5)	**Al Gerheauser** (10–19)	None	see 2nd game	61–86–3
151	September 26 (2)	@ Cardinals	3–2 (11)	**Dick Barrett** (9–13)	Red Munger (9–5)	None	7,275	62–86–3
152	September 27	@ Reds	2–3	Clyde Shoun (14–5)	**Bill Lee** (4–12)	None	767	62–87–3
153	September 28 (1)	@ Reds	3–4	Ray Starr (11–10)	**Schoolboy Rowe** (14–8)	None	see 2nd game	62–88–3
154	September 28 (2)	@ Reds	0–2	Joe Beggs (6–6)	**Jack Kraus** (9–15)	None	1,421	62–89–3
155	September 29	@ Reds	0–3	Johnny Vander Meer (14–16)	**Ken Raffensberger** (0–1)	None	2,350	62–90–3

October (2–0)

#	Date	Opponent	Score	Win	Loss	Save	Attendance	Record
156	October 3 (1)	@ Pirates	3–1	**Dick Barrett** (10–13)	Johnny Gee (4–4)	None	see 2nd game	63–90–3
157	October 3 (2)	@ Pirates	11–3	**Roger McKee** (1–0)	Cookie Cuccurullo (0–1)	None	5,430	64–90–3

^{^[a]}The June 5, 1943, game was protested by the Phillies in the middle of the eighth inning. The protest was later upheld and the game was completed with new umpires on June 29.
^{^[b]}The first game of a scheduled double-header on June 6, 1943, ended after five innings due to rain with the score tied 1–1, and an additional game was played on July 30.
^{^[c]}The second game of a scheduled double-header on June 13, 1943, ended with the score 6–3. After a verbal protest in the ninth inning, the Giants' Mel Ott lodged a formal protest. National League President Ford Frick ruled the hit batsman (Babe Dahlgren) out, and that the game be resumed on August 6.
^{^[d]}The June 30, 1943, game ended after eleven innings due to the Major League Baseball curfew with the score tied 3–3, and an additional game was played on August 11.
^{^[e]}The second game of a scheduled double-header on July 11, 1943, ended after eight innings due to the Pennsylvania Sunday curfew law with the score 8–14.
^{^[f]}The original schedule indicated a single games on May 10 and July 17 with New York; which became a double-header on July 17.
^{^[g]}The September 14, 1943, game ended after ten innings due to the National League curfew with the score tied 4–4, and an additional game was played on September 15.
^{^[h]}The original schedule indicated a single games on October 2 and 3 at Pittsburgh; which became a double-header on October 3.

=== Roster ===
1943 Philadelphia Phillies
**Roster**
**Pitchers**: 26 Dick Barrett; 15 Boom-Boom Beck; 21 Dick Conger; 17 Dutch Dietz; -- Deacon Donahue; 21,18 George Eyrich; 12 Charlie Fuchs; 6,11 Al Gerheauser; 10 Si Johnson; 6 Andy Karl; 27 Newt Kimball; 16 Jack Kraus; 21 Andy Lapihuska; 38 Bill Lee; 25,12 Dale Matthewson; 17 Roger McKee; 17 Johnny Podgajny; 15 Ken Raffensberger; 22,11 Schoolboy Rowe; -- Manny Salvo; 20 Bill Webb	**Catchers**: 29,26 Benny Culp; 15 Bob Finley; 7 Mickey Livingston; 10 Dee Moore; 18 Tom Padden; 15 Andy Seminick; **Infielders**: 20 Charlie Brewster; 3 Babe Dahlgren; 25 Garton Del Savio; 20 Ray Hamrick; 2 Pinky May; 1 Danny Murtaugh; 19 Glen Stewart; 28 Jimmy Wasdell	**Outfielders**: 5 Buster Adams; 9 Paul Busby; 8 Chuck Klein; 9,4 Danny Litwhiler; 5 Earl Naylor; 14 Ron Northey; 4 Coaker Triplett	**Manager**: 33 Freddie Fitzsimmons; 24 Bucky Harris; **Coaches**: 8 Chuck Klein; 23 Earl Whitehill

== Player stats ==
=== Batting ===
==== Starters by position ====
Note: Pos = Position; G = Games played; AB = At bats; H = Hits; Avg. = Batting average; HR = Home runs; RBI = Runs batted in

Pos	Player	G	AB	H	Avg.	HR	RBI
C	Mickey Livingston	84	265	66	.249	3	18
1B	Jimmy Wasdell	141	522	136	.261	4	67
2B	Danny Murtaugh	113	451	123	.273	1	35
SS	Glen Stewart	110	336	71	.211	2	24
3B	Pinky May	137	415	117	.282	1	48
OF	Ron Northey	147	586	163	.278	16	68
OF	Coaker Triplett	105	360	98	.272	14	52
OF	Buster Adams	111	418	107	.256	4	38

==== Other batters ====
Note: G = Games played; AB = At bats; H = Hits; Avg. = Batting average; HR = Home runs; RBI = Runs batted in

Player	G	AB	H	Avg.	HR	RBI
Babe Dahlgren	136	508	146	.287	5	56
Ray Hamrick	44	160	32	.200	0	9
Charlie Brewster	49	159	35	.220	0	12
Danny Litwhiler	36	139	36	.259	5	17
Earl Naylor	33	120	21	.175	3	14
Dee Moore	37	113	27	.239	1	8
Bob Finley	28	81	21	.259	1	7
Andy Seminick	22	72	13	.181	2	5
Tom Padden	17	41	12	.293	0	1
Paul Busby	26	40	10	.250	0	5
Benny Culp	10	24	5	.208	0	2
Chuck Klein	12	20	2	.100	0	3
Garton Del Savio	4	11	1	.091	0	0

=== Pitching ===
==== Starting pitchers ====
Note: G = Games pitched; IP = Innings pitched; W = Wins; L = Losses; ERA = Earned run average; SO = Strikeouts

Player	G	IP	W	L	ERA	SO
Al Gerheauser	38	215.0	10	19	3.60	92
Jack Kraus	34	199.2	9	15	3.16	48
Schoolboy Rowe	27	199.0	14	8	2.94	52
Dick Barrett	23	169.1	10	9	2.39	65
Si Johnson	21	113.0	8	3	3.27	46
Dick Conger	13	54.2	2	7	6.09	18
Ken Raffensberger	1	8.0	0	1	1.13	3

==== Other pitchers ====
Note: G = Games pitched; IP = Innings pitched; W = Wins; L = Losses; ERA = Earned run average; SO = Strikeouts

Player	G	IP	W	L	ERA	SO
Newt Kimball	34	89.2	1	6	4.12	33
Charlie Fuchs	17	77.2	2	7	4.29	12
Johnny Podgajny	13	64.0	4	4	4.22	13
Bill Lee	13	60.2	1	5	4.60	17
Andy Karl	9	26.2	1	2	7.09	4
Roger McKee	4	13.1	1	0	6.08	1

==== Relief pitchers ====
Note: G = Games pitched; W = Wins; L = Losses; SV = Saves; ERA = Earned run average; SO = Strikeouts

Player	G	W	L	SV	ERA	SO
Dutch Dietz	21	1	1	2	6.50	10
Dale Matthewson	11	0	3	0	4.85	8
George Eyrich	9	0	0	0	3.38	5
Boom-Boom Beck	4	0	0	0	9.88	3
Deacon Donahue	2	0	0	0	4.50	1
Andy Lapihuska	1	0	0	0	23.14	0
Bill Webb	1	0	0	0	9.00	0
Manny Salvo	1	0	0	0	27.00	0

== Farm system ==
Level	Team	League	Manager
A	Utica Braves	Eastern League	Wally Schang
B	Trenton Packers	Interstate League	George Ferrell
