= 1943 Brooklyn Dodgers season =

1943 Brooklyn Dodgers
- League: National League
- Ballpark: Ebbets Field
- City: Brooklyn, New York
- Record: 81–72 (.529)
- League place: 3rd
- Owners: James & Dearie Mulvey, Brooklyn Trust Company
- President: Branch Rickey
- Managers: Leo Durocher
- Radio: WHN; Red Barber, Connie Desmond

With the roster depleted by players leaving for service in World War II, the 1943 Brooklyn Dodgers finished the season in third place.

The team featured five future Hall of Famers: second baseman Billy Herman, shortstop Arky Vaughan, outfielders Paul Waner, and Joe Medwick, and manager Leo Durocher.

Herman finished fourth in MVP voting, after hitting .330 with 100 runs batted in. Vaughan led the league in runs scored and stolen bases.

== Offseason ==
- December 12, 1942: Johnny Allen and cash were traded by the Dodgers to the Philadelphia Phillies for Rube Melton.
- March 9, 1943: Babe Dahlgren was traded by the Dodgers to the Philadelphia Phillies for Lloyd Waner and Al Glossop.
- March 24, 1943: Schoolboy Rowe was purchased from the Dodgers by the Philadelphia Phillies.
- March 24, 1943: Jack Kraus was traded by the Dodgers to the Philadelphia Phillies for Bobby Bragan.

== Regular season ==
=== Season standings ===
National League
| Team | W | L | Pct. | GB | Home | Road |
|---|---|---|---|---|---|---|
| St. Louis Cardinals | 105 | 49 | .682 | — | 58‍–‍21 | 47‍–‍28 |
| Cincinnati Reds | 87 | 67 | .565 | 18 | 48‍–‍29 | 39‍–‍38 |
| Brooklyn Dodgers | 81 | 72 | .529 | 23½ | 46‍–‍31 | 35‍–‍41 |
| Pittsburgh Pirates | 80 | 74 | .519 | 25 | 47‍–‍30 | 33‍–‍44 |
| Chicago Cubs | 74 | 79 | .484 | 30½ | 36‍–‍38 | 38‍–‍41 |
| Boston Braves | 68 | 85 | .444 | 36½ | 38‍–‍39 | 30‍–‍46 |
| Philadelphia Phillies | 64 | 90 | .416 | 41 | 33‍–‍43 | 31‍–‍47 |
| New York Giants | 55 | 98 | .359 | 49½ | 34‍–‍43 | 21‍–‍55 |

=== Record vs. opponents ===
1943 National League record Sources:
| Team | BSN | BRO | CHC | CIN | NYG | PHI | PIT | STL |
|---|---|---|---|---|---|---|---|---|
| Boston | — | 12–9 | 8–14 | 11–11 | 11–11 | 11–11 | 12–10 | 3–19 |
| Brooklyn | 9–12 | — | 10–12 | 13–9 | 14–8 | 17–5 | 11–11 | 7–15 |
| Chicago | 14–8 | 12–10 | — | 9–13 | 12–9–1 | 10–12 | 8–14 | 9–13 |
| Cincinnati | 11–11 | 9–13 | 13–9 | — | 16–6–1 | 19–3 | 9–13 | 10–12 |
| New York | 11–11 | 8–14 | 9–12–1 | 6–16–1 | — | 8–14–1 | 9–13 | 4–18 |
| Philadelphia | 11–11 | 5–17 | 12–10 | 3–19 | 14–8–1 | — | 10–12–1 | 9–13–1 |
| Pittsburgh | 10–12 | 11–11 | 14–8 | 13–9 | 13–9 | 12–10–1 | — | 7–15–2 |
| St. Louis | 19–3 | 15–7 | 13–9 | 12–10 | 18–4 | 13–9–1 | 15–7–2 | — |

=== Notable transactions ===
- April 22, 1943: Johnny Allen was purchased by the Dodgers from the Philadelphia Phillies.
- May 15, 1943: Hal Peck was purchased from the Dodgers by the Chicago Cubs.
- May 20, 1943: Alex Kampouris was purchased from the Dodgers by the Washington Senators.
- May 20, 1943: Newt Kimball was purchased from the Dodgers by the Philadelphia Phillies.
- July 6, 1943: Joe Medwick was purchased from the Dodgers by the New York Giants.
- July 15, 1943: Bobo Newsom were traded by the Dodgers to the St. Louis Browns for Fritz Ostermueller and Archie McKain.
- July 31, 1943: Johnny Allen and Dolph Camilli were traded by the Dodgers to the New York Giants for Bill Lohrman, Bill Sayles and Joe Orengo.
- September 28, 1943: Al Glossop was purchased from the Dodgers by the Chicago Cubs.

=== Roster ===
1943 Brooklyn Dodgers
Roster
| Pitchers: 22 Johnny Allen; 12 Rex Barney; 22 Bob Chipman; 26 Curt Davis; 14 Freddie Fitzsimmons; 28 Hal Gregg; 14 Chris Haughey; 23 Ed Head; 13 Kirby Higbe; 21 Newt Kimball; 22 Bill Lohrman; 28 Max Macon; 12,32 Rube Melton; 8 Bobo Newsom; 27 Fritz Ostermueller; 27 Bill Sayles; 31 Les Webber (CL); 17 Whit Wyatt | Catchers: 15 Bobby Bragan; 27 Dee Moore; 10 Mickey Owen; Infielders: 33 Pat Ankenman; 3 Red Barkley; 3 Boyd Bartley; 4 Dolph Camilli; 3 Al Campanis; 18 Johnny Cooney; 2 Leo Durocher; 20 Al Glossop; 9 Bill Hart; 16 Billy Herman; 4 Gil Hodges; 3 Alex Kampouris; 4 Joe Orengo; 8 Howie Schultz; 5 Arky Vaughan | Outfielders: 36 Frenchy Bordagaray; 24 Augie Galan; 6 Carden Gillenwater; 14 Gene Hermanski; 7 Joe Medwick; 21 Luis Olmo; 11 Dixie Walker; 1 Paul Waner; Other batters: 6 Hal Peck | Manager: 2 Leo Durocher; Coaches: 30 Red Corriden; 6,7 Charlie Dressen; 35 Clyde Sukeforth |

== Player stats ==
=== Batting ===
==== Starters by position ====
Note: Pos = Position; G = Games played; AB = At bats; R = Runs; H = Hits; Avg. = Batting average; HR = Home runs; RBI = Runs batted in; SB = Stolen bases

| Pos | Player | G | AB | R | H | Avg. | HR | RBI | SB |
|---|---|---|---|---|---|---|---|---|---|
| C | Mickey Owen | 100 | 365 | 31 | 95 | .260 | 0 | 54 | 4 |
| 1B | Dolph Camilli | 95 | 353 | 56 | 87 | .246 | 6 | 43 | 2 |
| 2B | Billy Herman | 153 | 585 | 76 | 193 | .330 | 2 | 100 | 4 |
| 3B | Frenchy Bordagaray | 89 | 268 | 47 | 81 | .302 | 0 | 19 | 6 |
| SS | Arky Vaughan | 149 | 610 | 112 | 186 | .305 | 5 | 66 | 20 |
| OF | Dixie Walker | 138 | 540 | 83 | 163 | .302 | 5 | 71 | 3 |
| OF | Augie Galan | 139 | 495 | 83 | 142 | .287 | 9 | 67 | 6 |
| OF | Luis Olmo | 57 | 238 | 39 | 72 | .303 | 4 | 37 | 3 |

==== Other batters ====
Note: G = Games played; AB = At bats; R = Runs; H = Hits; Avg. = Batting average; HR = Home runs; RBI = Runs batted in; SB = Stolen bases

| Player | G | AB | R | H | Avg. | HR | RBI | SB |
|---|---|---|---|---|---|---|---|---|
| Paul Waner | 82 | 225 | 29 | 70 | .311 | 1 | 26 | 0 |
| Bobby Bragan | 74 | 220 | 17 | 58 | .264 | 2 | 24 | 0 |
| Al Glossop | 87 | 217 | 28 | 37 | .171 | 3 | 21 | 0 |
| Howie Schultz | 45 | 182 | 20 | 49 | .269 | 1 | 34 | 3 |
| Joe Medwick | 48 | 173 | 13 | 47 | .272 | 0 | 25 | 1 |
| Dee Moore | 37 | 79 | 8 | 20 | .253 | 0 | 12 | 1 |
| Gene Hermanski | 18 | 60 | 6 | 18 | .300 | 0 | 12 | 1 |
| Red Barkley | 20 | 51 | 6 | 16 | .314 | 0 | 7 | 1 |
| Alex Kampouris | 19 | 44 | 9 | 10 | .227 | 0 | 4 | 0 |
| Johnny Cooney | 37 | 34 | 7 | 7 | .206 | 0 | 2 | 1 |
| Boyd Bartley | 9 | 21 | 0 | 1 | .048 | 0 | 1 | 0 |
| Al Campanis | 7 | 20 | 3 | 2 | .100 | 0 | 0 | 0 |
| Bill Hart | 8 | 19 | 0 | 3 | .158 | 0 | 1 | 0 |
| Leo Durocher | 6 | 18 | 1 | 4 | .222 | 0 | 1 | 0 |
| Carden Gillenwater | 8 | 17 | 1 | 3 | .176 | 0 | 2 | 0 |
| Joe Orengo | 7 | 15 | 1 | 3 | .200 | 0 | 1 | 0 |
| Pat Ankenman | 2 | 2 | 1 | 1 | .500 | 0 | 0 | 0 |
| Gil Hodges | 1 | 2 | 0 | 0 | .000 | 0 | 0 | 1 |
| Hal Peck | 1 | 1 | 0 | 0 | .000 | 0 | 0 | 0 |

=== Pitching ===
==== Starting pitchers ====
Note: G = Games pitched; GS = Games started; CG = Complete games; IP = Innings pitched; W = Wins; L = Losses; ERA = Earned run average; BB = Bases on balls; SO = Strikeouts

| Player | G | GS | CG | IP | W | L | ERA | BB | SO |
|---|---|---|---|---|---|---|---|---|---|
| Kirby Higbe | 35 | 27 | 8 | 185.0 | 13 | 10 | 3.70 | 95 | 108 |
| Whit Wyatt | 26 | 26 | 13 | 180.2 | 14 | 5 | 2.49 | 43 | 80 |
| Curt Davis | 31 | 21 | 8 | 164.1 | 10 | 13 | 3.78 | 39 | 47 |
| Rex Barney | 9 | 8 | 1 | 45.1 | 2 | 2 | 6.35 | 41 | 23 |
| Freddie Fitzsimmons | 9 | 7 | 1 | 44.2 | 3 | 4 | 5.44 | 21 | 12 |
| Hal Gregg | 5 | 4 | 0 | 18.2 | 0 | 3 | 9.64 | 21 | 7 |

==== Other pitchers ====
Note: G = Games pitched; GS = Games started; CG = Complete games; IP = Innings pitched; W = Wins; L = Losses; ERA = Earned run average; BB = Bases on balls; SO = Strikeouts

| Player | G | GS | CG | IP | W | L | ERA | BB | SO |
|---|---|---|---|---|---|---|---|---|---|
| Bobo Newsom | 22 | 12 | 6 | 125.0 | 9 | 4 | 3.02 | 57 | 75 |
| Rube Melton | 30 | 17 | 4 | 119.1 | 5 | 8 | 3.92 | 79 | 63 |
| Ed Head | 47 | 18 | 7 | 115.2 | 2 | 2 | 3.81 | 69 | 24 |
| Max Macon | 25 | 9 | 0 | 77.0 | 7 | 5 | 5.96 | 32 | 21 |
| Bill Lohrman | 6 | 2 | 2 | 27.2 | 0 | 2 | 3.58 | 10 | 5 |
| Fritz Ostermueller | 7 | 1 | 0 | 27.1 | 1 | 1 | 3.29 | 12 | 15 |

==== Relief pitchers ====
Note: G = Games pitched; IP = Innings pitched; W = Wins; L = Losses; SV = Saves; ERA = Earned run average; BB = Bases on balls; SO = Strikeouts

| Player | G | IP | W | L | SV | ERA | BB | SO |
|---|---|---|---|---|---|---|---|---|
| Les Webber | 54 | 115.2 | 2 | 2 | 10 | 3.81 | 69 | 24 |
| Johnny Allen | 17 | 38.0 | 5 | 1 | 1 | 4.26 | 25 | 15 |
| Bill Sayles | 5 | 11.2 | 0 | 0 | 0 | 7.71 | 10 | 5 |
| Newt Kimball | 5 | 11.0 | 1 | 1 | 1 | 1.64 | 5 | 2 |
| Chris Haughey | 1 | 7.0 | 0 | 1 | 0 | 3.86 | 10 | 0 |
| Bob Chipman | 1 | 1.2 | 0 | 0 | 0 | 0.00 | 2 | 0 |

== Awards and honors ==
- 1943 Major League Baseball All-Star Game
  - Billy Herman starter
  - Augie Galan reserve
  - Mickey Owen reserve
  - Dixie Walker reserve
- TSN Major League All-Star Team
  - Billy Herman

=== League top ten finishers ===
Augie Galan

- #2 in NL in on-base percentage (.412)

Billy Herman

- #2 in NL in batting average (.330)
- #3 in NL in RBI (100)
- #3 in NL in hits (193)
- #3 in NL in on-base percentage (.398)

Kirby Higbe

- #5 in NL in strikeouts (108)

Arky Vaughan

- MLB leader in runs scored (112)
- NL leader in stolen bases (20)
- #5 in NL in hits (186)

Whit Wyatt

- #3 in NL in ERA (2.49)

== Farm System ==
| Level | Team | League | Manager |
|---|---|---|---|
| AA | Montreal Royals | International League | Fresco Thompson |
| A1 | New Orleans Pelicans | Southern Association | Ray Blades |
| B | Durham Bulls | Piedmont League | Bruno Betzel |
| D | Olean Oilers | Pennsylvania–Ontario–New York League | Jake Pitler |
