= Protested game =

Occurs in baseball, initiated by a manager

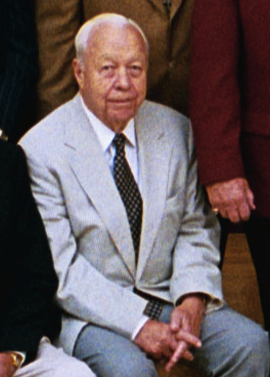
American League president Lee MacPhail upheld the protest by the Kansas City Royals in the Pine Tar Incident in 1983.

A protested game occurs in baseball when a manager believes that an umpire's decision is in violation of the official rules. In such cases, the manager can raise a protest by informing the umpires, and the game continues to be played "under protest." Protests were allowed in Major League Baseball (MLB) through the 2019 season, after which they were abolished, thus making all games official following their conclusion.

== Rules ==
Through the 2019 season, protests in Major League Baseball (MLB) were governed by Rule 7.04, "Protesting Games". Managers could initiate a protest "because of alleged misapplication of the rules", provided they notified the umpires "at the time the play under protest occurs and before the next pitch, play or attempted play" (in the case of a game-ending play, a protest could be filed with the league office by noon of the next day). A protested game was reviewed and adjudicated by the league president, or the executive vice president of baseball operations, who could order a game resumed (replayed from the point of the protested decision) only if finding the umpire's decision was in violation of the rules and the decision "adversely affected the protesting team’s chances of winning the game." (Note: In practice, if the protesting team went on to win the game, their protest was considered moot, although MLB rules did not specifically state this.) A well-known example of a protested game in MLB was the Pine Tar Incident in 1983, which was the only time that a protested game in the American League was ordered replayed from the point-of-protest. An umpire's judgment call (such as balls and strikes, safe or out, fair or foul) could not be protested.

In 2020, the provision to protest a game was removed, as Rule 7.04 now reads:

Protesting a game shall never be permitted, regardless of whether such complaint is based on judgment decisions by the umpire or an allegation that an umpire misapplied these rules or otherwise rendered a decision in violation of these rules.

== Upheld protests in MLB ==
Upheld protests were a rare event; the below tables list upheld protests in MLB.

=== Resumed games ===
Through 2019, the last season during which protests were allowed in MLB, there were only 15 known occurrences of a protest being upheld and the game being resumed from the point at which the protest was raised. Of those 15 occurrences, the protesting team went on to win eight of the resumed games.

Key
Protesting team won the game
Protesting team lost the game

Upheld protests with game resumed from the point-of-protest
Date	Venue	Protesting team	Inning	Opposing team	Nature of protest	Initial result	Final	Ref.
August 30, 1913	Baker Bowl, Philadelphia	New York Giants	9th (top)	Philadelphia Phillies	League president overruled a forfeit ruling by an umpire (who had awarded the game to the Giants) and awarded the game to the Phillies, who had been leading 8–6 at the time. (Note: See entry of the same date in the table in the following section.) The Giants' protest of the league president's decision was upheld by the league's board of the directors, who ordered the game played to completion. (Note: Although started in Philadelphia, the game was completed in New York at Polo Grounds, reportedly "the first time in the history of major league baseball a game started in one city [was] finished in another.")	Phillies 8 Giants 6	Phillies 8 Giants 6	
July 5, 1920	Polo Grounds, New York City	Philadelphia Phillies	7th (top)	New York Giants	Placement of runners following a Phillies pop-up that was not caught; one umpire had ruled a force out, the other an infield fly.	Giants 6 Phillies 0	Giants 13; Phillies 0	
May 28, 1921	Forbes Field, Pittsburgh	Pittsburgh Pirates	8th (bottom)	Cincinnati Reds	Umpires allowed a rundown to occur after the ball had been thrown into the Reds' dugout and thrown back to a player.	Reds 3 Pirates 2	Pirates 4 Reds 3	
July 2, 1934	Wrigley Field, Chicago	St. Louis Cardinals	7th (bottom)	Chicago Cubs	Infield fly was not called on a Cubs' pop-up in front of the plate with the bases loaded and one out.	Cubs 7 Cardinals 4	Cubs 7 Cardinals 1	
June 5, 1943	Sportsman's Park, St. Louis	Philadelphia Phillies	8th (middle)	St. Louis Cardinals	Game called on account of rain; Cardinals' grounds crew did not cover the field properly.	Cardinals 1 Phillies 0	Phillies 2 Cardinals 1	
June 13, 1943	Polo Grounds, New York City	New York Giants	9th (top)	Philadelphia Phillies	A Phillies batter deliberately stepped into a pitch, which should be ruled an out, but was not ruled out.	Phillies 6 Giants 3	Giants 4 Phillies 3	
August 17, 1947	Shibe Park, Philadelphia	Brooklyn Dodgers	7th (bottom)	Philadelphia Phillies	Deliberate stalling tactics by the Phillies after allowing a run in the top of the 7th inning so that the game would be halted due to curfew and roll back to the 6th inning tied score. (Note: Though the game was resumed as if it was protested by the Dodgers, it is unknown if the Dodgers actually protested this game or if then-NL President (and future Commissioner) Ford Frick made the ruling solely after reading the umpire’s report of the Phillies’ stalling tactics.)	Dodgers 4 Phillies 4	Dodgers 7 Phillies 5	
August 25, 1948	Forbes Field, Pittsburgh	Pittsburgh Pirates	9th (bottom)	Brooklyn Dodgers	Illegal substitution by Brooklyn; pitcher replaced before he had finished pitching to one batter. (Note: Although started in Pittsburgh, the game was completed in Brooklyn at Ebbets Field. The resumption is the first known time in modern major-league history that a team got a walk-off at their opponent’s stadium.)	Dodgers 11; Pirates 9	Pirates 12; Dodgers 11	
September 22, 1954	County Stadium, Milwaukee	Cincinnati Reds	9th (top)	Milwaukee Braves	Umpires ruled a Reds baserunner out after batter ran to first on an uncaught third strike (although already out) and drew a throw, which went into the outfield.	Braves 3 Reds 1	Braves 4 Reds 3	
August 1, 1971	Veterans Stadium, Philadelphia	St. Louis Cardinals	12th (top)	Philadelphia Phillies	Umpires called game after rain delay, reverting 6–3 Cardinals lead into 3–3 tie (score at end of 11th inning). Cardinals' protest was upheld, as unplayable field was due to breakdown of Phillies' rain removal machine.	Cardinals 3 Phillies 3	Cardinals 9 Phillies 6	
May 15, 1975	Jarry Park, Montreal	Atlanta Braves	4th (bottom)	Montreal Expos	Umpires called game after rain delay, negating a 4–1 Braves lead (game not yet official, so would have been replayed in its entirety). Braves protested, asserting umpires didn't wait long enough or test condition of field.	No game	Braves 5 Expos 4	
August 21, 1979	Shea Stadium, New York City	Houston Astros	9th (top)	New York Mets	Umpires disallowed a single by Houston batter Jeffrey Leonard that had occurred with Mets first baseman Ed Kranepool not on the field. League president Chub Feeney upheld protest and ruled that Leonard's hit was valid.	Mets 5 Astros 0	Mets 5 Astros 0	
July 24, 1983	Yankee Stadium, New York City	Kansas City Royals	9th (top)	New York Yankees	Pine Tar Incident: Umpires called Royals batter George Brett out after using a bat with too much pine tar on the handle.	Yankees 4 Royals 3	Royals 5 Yankees 4	
June 16, 1986	Three Rivers Stadium, Pittsburgh	Pittsburgh Pirates	6th (top)	St. Louis Cardinals	Pirates protested umpires' decision to call the game on account of rain; didn't wait long enough.	Cardinals 4 Pirates 1	Cardinals 4 Pirates 2	
August 19, 2014	Wrigley Field, Chicago	San Francisco Giants	5th (middle)	Chicago Cubs	Giants protested umpires' decision to call the game on account of rain; Cubs' grounds crew had difficulty covering the field during sudden heavy rain.	Cubs 2 Giants 0	Cubs 2 Giants 1	

=== Non-resumed games ===
There have been other instances of a protest being upheld, with the game not resumed from the point at which the protest was raised; most often, the game was ordered replayed. In one instance, the game was declared a no contest, and in another instance, the protesting team was declared the winner without further play being ordered. (Note: This ruling by the league president was challenged, and the league's board of directors ordered the game resumed. See entry of the same date in the table in the prior section.) Examples include:

Upheld protests with other remedy
Date	Venue	Protesting team	Inning	Opposing team	Nature of protest	Outcome	Ref.
May 7–8, 1902	West Side Park, Chicago	New York Giants	—	Chicago Orphans	The pitcher's plate (pitching rubber) was found to be the wrong distance from home plate. New York's protest was upheld, and the league ordered the games to be replayed.	Replayed	
October 2, 1912	West Side Park, Chicago	Pittsburgh Pirates	10th (bottom)	Chicago Cubs	Chicago won in extra innings, with the winning run driven in by a player who batted out of order. The basis of Pittsburgh's protest was that "the umpire was required to call attention to any infraction of the rules." The protest was upheld and the game result was simply removed from the league standings, as the protest was ruled on late in the 1912 season, with both teams out of pennant contention.	No contest	
August 30, 1913	Baker Bowl, Philadelphia	Philadelphia Phillies	9th (top)	New York Giants	Umpire forfeited game to Giants due to behavior of Phillies' fans, negating an 8–6 Phillies lead.	Phillies awarded victory	
May 14, 1914	Federal League Park, Buffalo	Chicago Whales	9th (bottom)	Buffalo Blues	Umpire's ruling following a dropped ball on an infield fly. League president upheld the protest and ordered the entire game replayed. (Note: Protest occurred within the Federal League, which is considered to have been a major league.)	Replayed	
June 19, 1915	Terrapin Park, Baltimore	Baltimore Terrapins	1st (top)	Chicago Whales	Umpire allowed a Chicago player to score after he had left the field and gone to the bench. League president upheld the protest and ordered the entire game replayed.	Replayed	
April 17, 1917	Braves Field, Boston	Philadelphia Phillies	2nd (top)	Boston Braves	Umpire ruled a Phillies player out for running outside the base path, on a play when the runner was not avoiding a tag. League president upheld the protest and ordered the entire game replayed.	Replayed	
August 19, 1917	Navin Field, Detroit	Washington Senators	9th (bottom)	Detroit Tigers	Detroit's third base coach (Ty Cobb) touched the Detroit baserunner who scored the winning run of the game as he rounded third base. League president upheld the protest and ordered the entire game replayed.	Replayed	
June 3, 1918	Ebbets Field, Brooklyn	Brooklyn Robins	6th (top)	St. Louis Cardinals	A Cardinals baserunner reached third base, started to run back to second base, then ran directly to home plate without re-touching third base; umpire allowed the run to count. League president upheld the protest and ordered the entire game replayed.	Replayed	
July 28, 1924	Sportsman's Park, St. Louis	St. Louis Browns	9th (bottom)	Boston Red Sox	Umpire's misunderstanding of substitutions led to the Browns batting out of order. League president upheld the protest and ordered the entire game replayed.	Replayed	
July 20, 1947	Ebbets Field, Brooklyn	St. Louis Cardinals	9th (top)	Brooklyn Dodgers	With the Cardinals leading 2–0, their batter hit a deep drive that was signaled as not a home run by one umpire. The batter, in running the bases, slowed up after seeing it signaled as a home run by another umpire and was thrown out at the plate; this was the basis of the protest. The protest was upheld, however the remedy was not to re-play the game from the point of protest; the league president ruled that the home run would count. As the Dodgers had gone on to score three runs in the bottom of the ninth, this turned a 3–2 Dodgers win into a 3–3 tie. The tie game stands as an official result, with all individual records counting. A replay of the tied game was held on August 18, 1947, which was won by the Dodgers.	Replayed (Note: The original game of July 20, 1947, was ruled a tie.)	
