= 1943 New York Giants (MLB) season =

1943 New York Giants
- League: National League
- Ballpark: Polo Grounds
- City: New York City
- Record: 59–98 (.376)
- League place: 8th
- Owners: Horace Stoneham
- Managers: Mel Ott

The 1943 New York Giants season was the franchise's 61st season. The team finished in eighth place in the National League with a 55–98 record, 49½ games behind the St. Louis Cardinals.

== Regular season ==
=== Season standings ===
National League
Team	W	L	Pct.	GB	Home	Road
St. Louis Cardinals	105	49	.682	—	58‍–‍21	47‍–‍28
Cincinnati Reds	87	67	.565	18	48‍–‍29	39‍–‍38
Brooklyn Dodgers	81	72	.529	23½	46‍–‍31	35‍–‍41
Pittsburgh Pirates	80	74	.519	25	47‍–‍30	33‍–‍44
Chicago Cubs	74	79	.484	30½	36‍–‍38	38‍–‍41
Boston Braves	68	85	.444	36½	38‍–‍39	30‍–‍46
Philadelphia Phillies	64	90	.416	41	33‍–‍43	31‍–‍47
New York Giants	55	98	.359	49½	34‍–‍43	21‍–‍55

=== Record vs. opponents ===
1943 National League record Sources:
Team	BSN	BRO	CHC	CIN	NYG	PHI	PIT	STL
Boston	—	12–9	8–14	11–11	11–11	11–11	12–10	3–19
Brooklyn	9–12	—	10–12	13–9	14–8	17–5	11–11	7–15
Chicago	14–8	12–10	—	9–13	12–9–1	10–12	8–14	9–13
Cincinnati	11–11	9–13	13–9	—	16–6–1	19–3	9–13	10–12
New York	11–11	8–14	9–12–1	6–16–1	—	8–14–1	9–13	4–18
Philadelphia	11–11	5–17	12–10	3–19	14–8–1	—	10–12–1	9–13–1
Pittsburgh	10–12	11–11	14–8	13–9	13–9	12–10–1	—	7–15–2
St. Louis	19–3	15–7	13–9	12–10	18–4	13–9–1	15–7–2	—

=== Roster ===
1943 New York Giants
Roster
Pitchers: 27 Ace Adams; 20 Johnny Allen; 27 Ken Chase; 24 Bobby Coombs; 32 Hugh East; 18 Harry Feldman; 29 Rube Fischer; 11 Carl Hubbell; 22 Bill Lohrman; 15 Cliff Melton; 17 Van Mungo; 20 Bill Sayles; 28 Frank Seward; 16 Tom Sunkel; 19 Ken Trinkle; 5 Bill Voiselle; 12 Johnnie Wittig	Catchers: 10 Ray Berres; 9 Ernie Lombardi; 8 Gus Mancuso; 10 Hugh Poland; 25 Joe Stephenson; Infielders: 14 Dick Bartell; 1 Sid Gordon; 7 Billy Jurges; 18 Buddy Kerr; 26,28 Joe Orengo; 21,23 Nap Reyes; 2 Mickey Witek	Outfielders: 5 Babe Barna; 29 Vic Bradford; 6 Buster Maynard; 22 Charlie Mead; 19 Joe Medwick; 4 Mel Ott; 3 Johnny Rucker	Manager: 4 Mel Ott; Coaches: 30 Bubber Jonnard; 31 Adolfo Luque

== Player stats ==
=== Batting ===
==== Starters by position ====
Note: Pos = Position; G = Games played; AB = At bats; H = Hits; Avg. = Batting average; HR = Home runs; RBI = Runs batted in

Pos	Player	G	AB	H	Avg.	HR	RBI
C	Gus Mancuso	94	252	50	.198	2	20
1B	Joe Orengo	83	266	58	.218	6	29
2B	Mickey Witek	153	622	195	.314	6	55
SS	Bill Jurges	136	481	110	.229	4	29
3B	Dick Bartell	99	337	91	.270	5	28
OF	Mel Ott	125	380	89	.234	18	47
OF	Joe Medwick	78	324	91	.281	5	45
OF	Johnny Rucker	132	505	138	.273	2	46

==== Other batters ====
Note: G = Games played; AB = At bats; H = Hits; Avg. = Batting average; HR = Home runs; RBI = Runs batted in

Player	G	AB	H	Avg.	HR	RBI
Sid Gordon	131	474	119	.251	9	63
Buster Maynard	121	393	81	.206	9	32
Ernie Lombardi	104	295	90	.305	10	51
Charlie Mead	37	146	40	.274	1	13
Nap Reyes	40	125	32	.256	0	13
Babe Barna	40	113	23	.204	1	12
Buddy Kerr	27	98	28	.286	2	12
Ray Berres	20	28	4	.143	0	0
Joe Stephenson	9	24	6	.250	0	1
Hugh Poland	4	12	1	.083	0	2
Vic Bradford	6	5	1	.200	0	1

=== Pitching ===
==== Starting pitchers ====
Note: G = Games pitched; IP = Innings pitched; W = Wins; L = Losses; ERA = Earned run average; SO = Strikeouts

Player	G	IP	W	L	ERA	SO
Cliff Melton	34	186.1	9	13	3.19	55
Rube Fischer	22	130.2	5	10	4.61	47
Ken Chase	21	129.1	4	12	4.11	86
Bill Lohrman	17	80.1	5	6	5.15	16
Carl Hubbell	12	66.0	4	4	4.91	31
Bill Voiselle	4	31.0	1	2	2.03	19
Frank Seward	1	9.0	0	1	3.00	2
Tom Sunkel	1	2.2	0	1	10.13	0

==== Other pitchers ====
Note: G = Games pitched; IP = Innings pitched; W = Wins; L = Losses; ERA = Earned run average; SO = Strikeouts

Player	G	IP	W	L	ERA	SO
Johnnie Wittig	40	164.0	5	15	4.23	56
Van Mungo	45	154.1	3	7	3.91	83
Harry Feldman	31	104.2	4	5	4.30	49
Bill Sayles	18	53.0	1	3	4.75	38
Ken Trinkle	11	45.2	1	5	3.74	10
Hugh East	13	40.1	1	3	5.36	21

==== Relief pitchers ====
Note: G = Games pitched; W = Wins; L = Losses; SV = Saves; ERA = Earned run average; SO = Strikeouts

Player	G	W	L	SV	ERA	SO
Ace Adams	70	11	7	9	2.82	46
Johnny Allen	15	1	3	2	3.07	24
Bobby Coombs	9	0	1	0	12.94	5

== Farm system ==
Level	Team	League	Manager
AA	Jersey City Giants	International League	Gabby Hartnett
A	Springfield Rifles	Eastern League	Spencer Abbott
D	Bristol Twins	Appalachian League	Hal Gruber
