= 1943 Pittsburgh Pirates season =

1943 Pittsburgh Pirates
- League: National League
- Ballpark: Forbes Field
- City: Pittsburgh, Pennsylvania
- Owners: Bill Benswanger
- Managers: Frankie Frisch
- Radio: WWSW; Rosey Rowswell, Jack Craddock

The 1943 Pittsburgh Pirates season was the 62nd season of the Pittsburgh Pirates franchise; the 57th in the National League. The Pirates finished fourth in the league standings with a record of 80–74.

== Regular season ==
=== Season standings ===
National League
Team	W	L	Pct.	GB	Home	Road
St. Louis Cardinals	105	49	.682	—	58‍–‍21	47‍–‍28
Cincinnati Reds	87	67	.565	18	48‍–‍29	39‍–‍38
Brooklyn Dodgers	81	72	.529	23½	46‍–‍31	35‍–‍41
Pittsburgh Pirates	80	74	.519	25	47‍–‍30	33‍–‍44
Chicago Cubs	74	79	.484	30½	36‍–‍38	38‍–‍41
Boston Braves	68	85	.444	36½	38‍–‍39	30‍–‍46
Philadelphia Phillies	64	90	.416	41	33‍–‍43	31‍–‍47
New York Giants	55	98	.359	49½	34‍–‍43	21‍–‍55

=== Record vs. opponents ===
1943 National League record Sources:
Team	BSN	BRO	CHC	CIN	NYG	PHI	PIT	STL
Boston	—	12–9	8–14	11–11	11–11	11–11	12–10	3–19
Brooklyn	9–12	—	10–12	13–9	14–8	17–5	11–11	7–15
Chicago	14–8	12–10	—	9–13	12–9–1	10–12	8–14	9–13
Cincinnati	11–11	9–13	13–9	—	16–6–1	19–3	9–13	10–12
New York	11–11	8–14	9–12–1	6–16–1	—	8–14–1	9–13	4–18
Philadelphia	11–11	5–17	12–10	3–19	14–8–1	—	10–12–1	9–13–1
Pittsburgh	10–12	11–11	14–8	13–9	13–9	12–10–1	—	7–15–2
St. Louis	19–3	15–7	13–9	12–10	18–4	13–9–1	15–7–2	—

=== Game log ===
1943 Game Log: 80–74 (Home: 47–30; Away: 33–44)
April: 3–4 (Home: 1–2; Away: 2–2)

#	Date	Opponent	Score	Win	Loss	Save	Attendance	Record
1	April 21	@ Cubs	6–0	**Sewell** (1–0)	Derringer	—	9,044	1–0
2	April 22	@ Cubs	3–4	Hanyzewski	**Dietz** (0–1)	—	3,325	1–1
3	April 24	@ Cubs	3–6	Bithorn	**Hallett** (0–1)	—	6,771	1–2
4	April 25	@ Cubs	6–2	**Sewell** (2–0)	Warneke	—	7,349	2–2
5	April 27	Reds	4–1	**Lanning** (1–0)	Starr	**Rescigno** (1)	11,937	3–2
6	April 28	Reds	1–3	Riddle	**Hebert** (0–1)	Beggs	2,121	3–3
7	April 29	Reds	1–6	Vander Meer	**Gornicki** (0–1)	—	3,146	3–4

May: 13–13 (Home: 9–3; Away: 4–10)

#	Date	Opponent	Score	Win	Loss	Save	Attendance	Record
8	May 1	Cubs	6–3	**Sewell** (3–0)	Passeau	—	2,667	4–4
9	May 2	Cubs	3–0	**Hebert** (1–1)	Bithorn	—	16,491	5–4
10	May 2	Cubs	1–0	**Klinger** (1–0)	Barrett	—	16,491	6–4
11	May 3	@ Reds	5–7	Vander Meer	**Dietz** (0–2)	Riddle	2,958	6–5
12	May 4	@ Reds	8–3	**Rescigno** (1–0)	Starr	—	1,685	7–5
13	May 5	@ Reds	2–3	Walters	**Lanning** (1–1)	—	8,370	7–6
14	May 9	Cardinals	1–8	Cooper	**Hebert** (1–2)	—	25,887	7–7
15	May 9	Cardinals	3–3			—	25,887	7–7
16	May 13	@ Dodgers	4–5	Webber	**Dietz** (0–3)	—	6,735	7–8
17	May 14	@ Dodgers	5–2	**Gornicki** (1–1)	Fitzsimmons	—	7,230	8–8
18	May 15	@ Giants	1–2 (11)	Adams	**Rescigno** (1–1)	—	6,856	8–9
19	May 16	@ Giants	1–3	Wittig	**Butcher** (0–1)	—	13,056	8–10
20	May 16	@ Giants	2–1	**Klinger** (2–0)	Trinkle	—	13,056	9–10
21	May 18	@ Braves	0–4	Javery	**Sewell** (3–1)	—	1,026	9–11
22	May 19	@ Braves	1–2 (11)	Andrews	**Rescigno** (1–2)	—	—	9–12
23	May 19	@ Braves	3–5	Jeffcoat	**Gornicki** (1–2)	Stout	4,959	9–13
24	May 22	@ Phillies	0–10	Rowe	**Klinger** (2–1)	—	11,692	9–14
25	May 23	@ Phillies	4–1	**Sewell** (4–1)	Podgajny	—	—	10–14
26	May 23	@ Phillies	2–5	Kraus	**Rescigno** (1–3)	Johnson	—	10–15
27	May 26	Dodgers	17–4	**Hebert** (2–2)	Macon	—	2,130	11–15
28	May 27	Dodgers	9–5	**Lanning** (2–1)	Melton	**Butcher** (1)	14,724	12–15
29	May 28	Dodgers	2–6	Head	**Gornicki** (1–3)	—	2,456	12–16
30	May 29	Phillies	12–4	**Rescigno** (2–3)	Gerheauser	—	1,727	13–16
31	May 30	Phillies	4–3	**Sewell** (5–1)	Rowe	—	—	14–16
32	May 30	Phillies	2–1 (10)	**Hebert** (3–2)	Kraus	—	7,297	15–16
33	May 31	Braves	1–6	Tobin	**Brandt** (0–1)	—	14,391	15–17
34	May 31	Braves	4–0	**Klinger** (3–1)	Salvo	—	14,391	16–17

June: 16–11 (Home: 12–4; Away: 4–7)

#	Date	Opponent	Score	Win	Loss	Save	Attendance	Record
35	June 1	Braves	5–4 (14)	**Lanning** (3–1)	Javery	—	1,077	17–17
36	June 2	Braves	3–2	**Rescigno** (3–3)	Andrews	—	10,162	18–17
37	June 3	Giants	9–6	**Sewell** (6–1)	Trinkle	**Lanning** (1)	3,051	19–17
38	June 4	Giants	9–8	**Butcher** (1–1)	Mungo	**Gornicki** (1)	14,120	20–17
39	June 5	Giants	1–5	Hubbell	**Rescigno** (3–4)	—	3,186	20–18
40	June 6	Giants	18–1	**Klinger** (4–1)	Melton	—	—	21–18
41	June 6	Giants	7–0	**Hallett** (1–1)	Wittig	—	21,358	22–18
42	June 7	Dodgers	1–4	Fitzsimmons	**Hebert** (3–3)	—	19,162	22–19
43	June 9	@ Cardinals	3–4	Cooper	**Sewell** (6–2)	—	2,365	22–20
44	June 10	@ Cardinals	0–5	Lanier	**Gornicki** (1–4)	—	13,356	22–21
45	June 12	@ Cardinals	0–1	Pollet	**Hallett** (1–2)	—	3,022	22–22
46	June 13	@ Cardinals	10–3	**Hebert** (4–3)	Brecheen	—	16,255	23–22
47	June 13	@ Cardinals	4–4 (12)			—	16,255	23–22
48	June 15	Cubs	4–2	**Sewell** (7–2)	Prim	—	1,707	24–22
49	June 16	Cubs	5–2	**Gornicki** (2–4)	Bithorn	—	12,389	25–22
50	June 17	Cubs	2–3 (7)	Derringer	**Hebert** (4–4)	—	2,071	25–23
51	June 18	Reds	0–1 (14)	Starr	**Butcher** (1–2)	—	2,274	25–24
52	June 19	Reds	4–3 (11)	**Lanning** (4–1)	Shoun	—	4,235	26–24
53	June 20	Reds	5–4	**Sewell** (8–2)	Vander Meer	—	—	27–24
54	June 20	Reds	4–2	**Rescigno** (4–4)	Beggs	**Lanning** (2)	27,392	28–24
55	June 22	@ Cubs	0–1	Derringer	**Podgajny** (0–1)	—	3,783	28–25
56	June 23	@ Cubs	1–4	Passeau	**Hebert** (4–5)	—	—	28–26
57	June 23	@ Cubs	7–5	**Gornicki** (3–4)	Fleming	—	8,893	29–26
58	June 24	@ Cubs	2–1	**Sewell** (9–2)	Lee	—	3,217	30–26
59	June 26	@ Reds	9–0	**Butcher** (2–2)	Vander Meer	—	2,104	31–26
60	June 27	@ Reds	3–6	Riddle	**Podgajny** (0–2)	—	12,015	31–27
61	June 27	@ Reds	1–5	Starr	**Gornicki** (3–5)	Beggs	12,015	31–28
62	June 28	Reds	7–1	**Sewell** (10–2)	Walters	—	12,979	32–28
63	June 30	@ Phillies	3–3 (11)			—	10,655	32–28

July: 18–14 (Home: 12–7; Away: 6–7)

#	Date	Opponent	Score	Win	Loss	Save	Attendance	Record
64	July 1	@ Phillies	1–6	Rowe	**Podgajny** (0–3)	—	—	32–29
65	July 1	@ Phillies	2–1	**Klinger** (5–1)	Gerheauser	—	6,884	33–29
66	July 2	@ Phillies	2–1	**Sewell** (11–2)	Kraus	—	3,669	34–29
67	July 3	@ Braves	10–1	**Rescigno** (5–4)	Javery	—	2,559	35–29
68	July 4	@ Braves	1–3	Barrett	**Hebert** (4–6)	—	—	35–30
69	July 4	@ Braves	0–13	Tobin	**Gornicki** (3–6)	—	13,275	35–31
70	July 5	@ Giants	8–4	**Butcher** (3–2)	Melton	—	—	36–31
71	July 5	@ Giants	0–9	Chase	**Klinger** (5–2)	—	8,688	36–32
72	July 8	@ Dodgers	8–2	**Sewell** (12–2)	Fitzsimmons	—	7,075	37–32
73	July 9	@ Dodgers	7–8 (10)	Higbe	**Klinger** (5–3)	—	9,563	37–33
74	July 10	@ Dodgers	6–23	Davis	**Podgajny** (0–4)	—	14,631	37–34
75	July 11	@ Dodgers	3–2	**Butcher** (4–2)	Higbe	—	—	38–34
76	July 11	@ Dodgers	4–5	Allen	**Rescigno** (5–5)	Head	28,696	38–35
77	July 15	Cardinals	4–3	**Klinger** (6–3)	Lanier	—	24,578	39–35
78	July 16	Cardinals	9–5	**Sewell** (13–2)	Krist	—	4,050	40–35
79	July 17	Cardinals	7–3	**Butcher** (5–2)	Brecheen	—	—	41–35
80	July 17	Cardinals	3–2	**Hebert** (5–6)	Munger	—	11,362	42–35
81	July 18	Cardinals	4–7	Cooper	**Gornicki** (3–7)	—	—	42–36
82	July 18	Cardinals	5–6	Munger	**Sewell** (13–3)	Cooper	34,349	42–37
83	July 20	Phillies	1–0	**Sewell** (14–3)	Barrett	—	11,996	43–37
84	July 21	Phillies	10–2	**Klinger** (7–3)	Conger	—	2,041	44–37
85	July 22	Phillies	0–3	Rowe	**Butcher** (5–3)	—	—	44–38
86	July 22	Phillies	6–9	Kraus	**Gornicki** (3–8)	—	5,199	44–39
87	July 23	Phillies	3–2	**Gee** (1–0)	Gerheauser	—	1,895	45–39
88	July 24	Dodgers	6–1	**Sewell** (15–3)	Melton	—	5,951	46–39
89	July 25	Dodgers	7–1	**Klinger** (8–3)	Head	—	—	47–39
90	July 25	Dodgers	7–1	**Hebert** (6–6)	Higbe	—	30,309	48–39
91	July 26	Dodgers	6–10 (10)	Macon	**Butcher** (5–4)	—	6,125	48–40
92	July 27	Giants	8–5	**Gee** (2–0)	Chase	—	2,735	49–40
93	July 28	Giants	8–3	**Sewell** (16–3)	Hubbell	—	29,585	50–40
94	July 30	Giants	7–13	Melton	**Klinger** (8–4)	Adams	2,851	50–41
95	July 31	Braves	5–6	Javery	**Hebert** (6–7)	—	3,762	50–42

August: 17–20 (Home: 6–7; Away: 11–13)

#	Date	Opponent	Score	Win	Loss	Save	Attendance	Record
96	August 1	Braves	3–6 (10)	Tobin	**Gee** (2–1)	—	—	50–43
97	August 1	Braves	7–1	**Sewell** (17–3)	Odom	—	31,844	51–43
98	August 2	Braves	5–4	**Gornicki** (4–8)	Barrett	—	11,109	52–43
99	August 3	Braves	1–6	Andrews	**Rescigno** (5–6)	—	2,455	52–44
100	August 4	Phillies	6–2	**Butcher** (6–4)	Gerheauser	—	10,417	53–44
101	August 6	@ Cardinals	3–8	Lanier	**Sewell** (17–4)	—	23,976	53–45
102	August 7	@ Cardinals	4–1	**Hebert** (7–7)	Munger	—	3,530	54–45
103	August 8	@ Cardinals	6–8	Dickson	**Rescigno** (5–7)	Lanier	—	54–46
104	August 8	@ Cardinals	2–5	Brecheen	**Klinger** (8–5)	—	15,572	54–47
105	August 11	@ Phillies	1–2	Rowe	**Sewell** (17–5)	—	—	54–48
106	August 11	@ Phillies	0–2	Barrett	**Gornicki** (4–9)	—	11,129	54–49
107	August 12	@ Phillies	3–4	Conger	**Rescigno** (5–8)	Kimball	12,065	54–50
108	August 14	@ Phillies	8–2	**Klinger** (9–5)	Kraus	—	—	55–50
109	August 14	@ Phillies	2–1	**Butcher** (7–4)	Gerheauser	**Gornicki** (2)	6,344	56–50
110	August 15	@ Braves	1–5	Tobin	**Hebert** (7–8)	—	—	56–51
111	August 15	@ Braves	11–1	**Sewell** (18–5)	Barrett	—	18,400	57–51
112	August 16	@ Braves	5–1	**Gee** (3–1)	Javery	—	1,654	58–51
113	August 17	@ Braves	8–0	**Gornicki** (5–9)	Andrews	—	—	59–51
114	August 17	@ Braves	4–3 (11)	**Gornicki** (6–9)	Andrews	**Sewell** (1)	4,831	60–51
115	August 18	@ Giants	7–6 (10)	**Gornicki** (7–9)	Allen	**Sewell** (2)	—	61–51
116	August 18	@ Giants	2–3	Hubbell	**Butcher** (7–5)	—	5,805	61–52
117	August 19	@ Giants	8–1	**Hebert** (8–8)	Fischer	—	2,863	62–52
118	August 20	@ Giants	2–3	Chase	**Sewell** (18–6)	—	—	62–53
119	August 20	@ Giants	4–7	Melton	**Klinger** (9–6)	—	7,050	62–54
120	August 21	@ Giants	4–3	**Brandt** (1–1)	Feldman	—	5,186	63–54
121	August 22	@ Dodgers	1–6	Head	**Gornicki** (7–10)	—	—	63–55
122	August 22	@ Dodgers	6–8	Barney	**Gornicki** (7–11)	—	28,285	63–56
123	August 24	@ Dodgers	9–6 (6)	**Sewell** (19–6)	Davis	**Gornicki** (3)	6,611	64–56
124	August 25	@ Dodgers	4–6	Wyatt	**Butcher** (7–6)	Webber	10,995	64–57
125	August 26	Cubs	2–3	Derringer	**Hebert** (8–9)	—	2,107	64–58
126	August 27	Cubs	2–3	Passeau	**Klinger** (9–7)	—	9,115	64–59
127	August 28	Cubs	5–4	**Gee** (4–1)	Wyse	—	3,154	65–59
128	August 29	Cubs	2–11	Bithorn	**Sewell** (19–7)	—	—	65–60
129	August 29	Cubs	3–1	**Gornicki** (8–11)	Hanyzewski	—	19,142	66–60
130	August 30	Cardinals	4–3 (10)	**Brandt** (2–1)	Brazle	—	—	67–60

September: 13–10 (Home: 7–5; Away: 6–5)

#	Date	Opponent	Score	Win	Loss	Save	Attendance	Record
133	September 1	Cardinals	6–8	Dickson	**Gee** (4–2)	—	5,234	67–63
134	September 3	@ Cubs	5–1	**Sewell** (20–7)	Hanyzewski	—	5,717	68–63
135	September 4	@ Cubs	7–4	**Gornicki** (9–11)	Derringer	**Rescigno** (2)	3,212	69–63
136	September 5	@ Cubs	5–4 (12)	**Brandt** (3–1)	Erickson	**Sewell** (3)	—	70–63
137	September 6	@ Cardinals	2–3	Brazle	**Butcher** (7–7)	—	—	70–64
138	September 6	@ Cardinals	2–6	Brecheen	**Hebert** (8–11)	—	13,429	70–65
139	September 8	@ Cardinals	1–5	Munger	**Sewell** (20–8)	—	4,049	70–66
140	September 10	@ Reds	9–6	**Hebert** (9–11)	Beggs	—	—	71–66
141	September 10	@ Reds	0–1	Walters	**Butcher** (7–8)	—	9,613	71–67
142	September 11	@ Reds	11–1	**Klinger** (10–8)	Vander Meer	—	1,568	72–67
143	September 12	@ Reds	0–1	Riddle	**Sewell** (20–9)	—	—	72–68
144	September 12	@ Reds	7–0	**Rescigno** (6–8)	Starr	—	10,303	73–68
145	September 17	Reds	1–0	**Butcher** (8–8)	Walters	—	6,118	74–68
146	September 19	Reds	10–3	**Sewell** (21–9)	Riddle	—	—	75–68
147	September 19	Reds	2–1	**Butcher** (9–8)	Vander Meer	—	13,646	76–68
148	September 22	Braves	3–5	Andrews	**Gornicki** (9–12)	—	1,404	76–69
149	September 23	Braves	1–2	Tobin	**Gee** (4–3)	—	1,784	76–70
150	September 25	Giants	7–2	**Butcher** (10–8)	Chase	—	1,530	77–70
151	September 26	Giants	5–0	**Klinger** (11–8)	Melton	—	—	78–70
152	September 26	Giants	3–4 (10)	Voiselle	**Gornicki** (9–13)	—	38,617	78–71
153	September 28	Dodgers	5–2	**Hebert** (10–11)	Melton	—	—	79–71
154	September 28	Dodgers	4–2	**Brandt** (4–1)	Davis	**Gornicki** (4)	3,410	80–71
155	September 29	Dodgers	7–14	Ostermueller	**Rescigno** (6–9)	—	1,579	80–72

October: 0–2 (Home: 0–2; Away: 0–0)

#	Date	Opponent	Score	Win	Loss	Save	Attendance	Record
156	October 3	Phillies	1–3	Barrett	**Gee** (4–4)	—	—	80–73
157	October 3	Phillies	3–11	McKee	**Cuccurullo** (0–1)	—	5,430	80–74

Legend: = Win = Loss = Tie
Bold = Pirates team member

=== Roster ===
1943 Pittsburgh Pirates
**Roster**
**Pitchers**: 24 Bill Brandt; 19 Max Butcher; 23 Cookie Cuccurullo; 22 Dutch Dietz; 26 Johnny Gee; 27 Hank Gornicki; 40 Jack Hallett; 21 Wally Hebert; 20 Bob Klinger; 29 Johnny Lanning; 39 Johnny Podgajny; 4 Xavier Rescigno; 30 Rip Sewell; 25 Harry Shuman	**Catchers**: 1 Bill Baker; 22 Hank Camelli; 12 Al López; **Infielders**: 5 Pete Coscarart; 8 Bob Elliott; 3 Elbie Fletcher; 4 Huck Geary; 16 Frankie Gustine; 2 Tony Ordeñana; 4 Al Rubeling	**Outfielders**: 18 Johnny Barrett; 23 Frank Colman; 9 Vince DiMaggio; 11,26 Tommy O'Brien; 32 Jim Russell; 17 Maurice Van Robays; 14 Johnny Wyrostek; **Other batters**: -- Jimmy Wasdell	**Manager**: 35 Frankie Frisch; **Coaches**: 36 Spud Davis; 34 Jake Flowers; 33 Honus Wagner

== Player stats ==
=== Batting ===
==== Starters by position ====
Note: Pos = Position; G = Games played; AB = At bats; H = Hits; Avg. = Batting average; HR = Home runs; RBI = Runs batted in

Pos	Player	G	AB	H	Avg.	HR	RBI
C	Al López	118	372	98	.263	1	39
1B	Elbie Fletcher	154	544	154	.283	9	70
2B	Pete Coscarart	133	491	119	.242	0	48
SS	Frankie Gustine	112	414	120	.290	0	43
3B	Bob Elliott	156	581	183	.315	7	101
OF	Johnny Barrett	130	290	67	.231	1	32
OF	Vince DiMaggio	157	580	144	.248	15	88
OF	Jim Russell	146	533	138	.259	4	44

==== Other batters ====
Note: G = Games played; AB = At bats; H = Hits; Avg. = Batting average; HR = Home runs; RBI = Runs batted in

Player	G	AB	H	Avg.	HR	RBI
Maurice Van Robays	69	236	68	.288	1	35
Tommy O'Brien	89	232	72	.310	2	26
Bill Baker	63	172	47	.273	1	26
Al Rubeling	47	168	44	.262	0	9
Huck Geary	46	166	25	.151	1	13
Johnny Wyrostek	51	79	12	.152	0	1
Frank Colman	32	59	16	.271	0	4
Tony Ordeñana	1	4	2	.500	0	3
Hank Camelli	1	3	0	.000	0	0
Jimmy Wasdell	4	2	1	.500	0	1

=== Pitching ===
==== Starting pitchers ====
Note: G = Games pitched; IP = Innings pitched; W = Wins; L = Losses; ERA = Earned run average; SO = Strikeouts

Player	G	IP	W	L	ERA	SO
Rip Sewell	35	265.1	21	9	2.54	65
Bob Klinger	33	195.0	11	8	2.72	65
Max Butcher	33	193.2	10	8	2.60	45
Wally Hebert	34	184.0	10	11	2.98	41
Johnny Gee	15	82.0	4	4	4.28	18
Cookie Cuccurullo	1	7.0	0	1	6.43	3

==== Other pitchers ====
Note: G = Games pitched; IP = Innings pitched; W = Wins; L = Losses; ERA = Earned run average; SO = Strikeouts

Player	G	IP	W	L	ERA	SO
Hank Gornicki	42	147.0	9	13	3.98	63
Xavier Rescigno	37	132.2	6	9	2.98	41
Jack Hallett	9	47.2	1	2	1.70	11
Johnny Podgajny	15	34.1	0	4	4.72	7
Johnny Lanning	12	27.0	4	1	2.33	11

==== Relief pitchers ====
Note: G = Games pitched; W = Wins; L = Losses; SV = Saves; ERA = Earned run average; SO = Strikeouts

Player	G	W	L	SV	ERA	SO
Bill Brandt	29	4	1	0	3.14	17
Harry Shuman	11	0	0	0	5.32	5
Dutch Dietz	8	0	3	0	6.00	4

== Farm system ==
Level	Team	League	Manager
AA	Toronto Maple Leafs	International League	Burleigh Grimes
A	Albany Senators	Eastern League	Ripper Collins
B	York White Roses	Interstate League	Bunny Griffiths
D	Hornell Maples	PONY League	Frank Oceak
