= 1943 Chicago Cubs season =

1943 Chicago Cubs
- League: National League
- Ballpark: Wrigley Field
- City: Chicago
- Record: 74–79 (.484)
- League place: 5th
- Owners: Philip K. Wrigley
- General managers: James T. Gallagher
- Managers: Jimmie Wilson
- Radio: WGN (Jack Brickhouse, Dick Enroth); WJJD (Bert Wilson, Pat Flanagan); WCFL (Hal Totten)

The 1943 Chicago Cubs season was the 72nd season of the Chicago Cubs franchise, the 68th in the National League and the 28th at Wrigley Field. The Cubs finished fifth in the National League with a record of 74–79.

== Regular season ==
=== Season standings ===
National League
Team	W	L	Pct.	GB	Home	Road
St. Louis Cardinals	105	49	.682	—	58‍–‍21	47‍–‍28
Cincinnati Reds	87	67	.565	18	48‍–‍29	39‍–‍38
Brooklyn Dodgers	81	72	.529	23½	46‍–‍31	35‍–‍41
Pittsburgh Pirates	80	74	.519	25	47‍–‍30	33‍–‍44
Chicago Cubs	74	79	.484	30½	36‍–‍38	38‍–‍41
Boston Braves	68	85	.444	36½	38‍–‍39	30‍–‍46
Philadelphia Phillies	64	90	.416	41	33‍–‍43	31‍–‍47
New York Giants	55	98	.359	49½	34‍–‍43	21‍–‍55

=== Record vs. opponents ===
1943 National League record Sources:
Team	BSN	BRO	CHC	CIN	NYG	PHI	PIT	STL
Boston	—	12–9	8–14	11–11	11–11	11–11	12–10	3–19
Brooklyn	9–12	—	10–12	13–9	14–8	17–5	11–11	7–15
Chicago	14–8	12–10	—	9–13	12–9–1	10–12	8–14	9–13
Cincinnati	11–11	9–13	13–9	—	16–6–1	19–3	9–13	10–12
New York	11–11	8–14	9–12–1	6–16–1	—	8–14–1	9–13	4–18
Philadelphia	11–11	5–17	12–10	3–19	14–8–1	—	10–12–1	9–13–1
Pittsburgh	10–12	11–11	14–8	13–9	13–9	12–10–1	—	7–15–2
St. Louis	19–3	15–7	13–9	12–10	18–4	13–9–1	15–7–2	—

=== Roster ===
1943 Chicago Cubs
Roster
Pitchers: 31 Dale Alderson; 38 Dick Barrett; 35 Hi Bithorn; 36 John Burrows; 30 Paul Derringer; 37 Paul Erickson; 36 Bill Fleming; 34 Ed Hanyzewski; 31 Bill Lee; 33 Jake Mooty; 13 Claude Passeau; 39 Ray Prim; 50 Walter Signer; 32 Lon Warneke; 33,45 Hank Wyse	Catchers: 12 Chico Hernández; 12 Billy Holm; 11 Mickey Kreitner; 38 Mickey Livingston; 10 Clyde McCullough; 11 Al Todd; Infielders: 24 Heinz Becker; 44 Phil Cavarretta; 8 Pete Elko; 20 Stan Hack; 20 Don Johnson; 22 Stu Martin; 21 Lennie Merullo; 21 Bill Schuster; 25 Eddie Stanky	Outfielders: 46 Dom Dallessandro; 22 Charlie Gilbert; 51 Ival Goodman; 47 Peanuts Lowrey; 43 Bill Nicholson; 45 Lou Novikoff; 47 Johnny Ostrowski; 33 Andy Pafko; 48 Whitey Platt; 24 Ed Sauer	Manager: 40 Jimmie Wilson; Coaches: 42 Kiki Cuyler; 41 Dick Spalding

== Player stats ==
=== Batting ===
==== Starters by position ====
Note: Pos = Position; G = Games played; AB = At bats; H = Hits; Avg. = Batting average; HR = Home runs; RBI = Runs batted in

Pos	Player	G	AB	H	Avg.	HR	RBI
C	Clyde McCullough	87	266	63	.237	2	23
1B	Phil Cavarretta	143	530	154	.291	8	73
2B	Eddie Stanky	142	510	125	.245	0	47
SS	Lennie Merullo	129	453	115	.254	1	25
3B	Stan Hack	144	533	154	.289	3	35
OF	Peanuts Lowrey	130	480	140	.292	1	63
OF	Bill Nicholson	154	608	188	.309	29	128
OF	Lou Novikoff	78	233	65	.279	0	28

==== Other batters ====
Note: G = Games played; AB = At bats; H = Hits; Avg. = Batting average; HR = Home runs; RBI = Runs batted in

Player	G	AB	H	Avg.	HR	RBI
Ival Goodman	80	225	72	.320	3	45
Dom Dallessandro	87	176	39	.222	1	31
Chico Hernández	43	126	34	.270	0	9
Stu Martin	64	118	26	.220	0	5
Mickey Livingston	36	111	29	.261	4	16
Heinz Becker	24	69	10	.145	0	2
Andy Pafko	13	58	22	.379	0	10
Ed Sauer	14	55	15	.273	0	9
Bill Schuster	13	51	15	.294	0	0
Al Todd	21	45	6	.133	0	1
Don Johnson	10	42	8	.190	0	1
Whitey Platt	20	41	7	.171	0	2
Pete Elko	9	30	4	.133	0	0
Johnny Ostrowski	10	29	6	.207	0	3
Charlie Gilbert	8	20	3	.150	0	0
Billy Holm	7	15	1	.067	0	0
Mickey Kreitner	3	8	3	.375	0	2

=== Pitching ===
==== Starting pitchers ====
Note: G = Games pitched; IP = Innings pitched; W = Wins; L = Losses; ERA = Earned run average; SO = Strikeouts

Player	G	IP	W	L	ERA	SO
Claude Passeau	35	257.0	15	12	2.91	93
Hi Bithorn	39	249.2	18	12	2.60	86
Paul Derringer	32	174.0	10	14	3.57	75
Bill Lee	13	78.1	3	7	3.56	18

==== Other pitchers ====
Note: G = Games pitched; IP = Innings pitched; W = Wins; L = Losses; ERA = Earned run average; SO = Strikeouts

Player	G	IP	W	L	ERA	SO
Hank Wyse	38	156.0	9	7	2.94	45
Ed Hanyzewski	33	130.0	8	7	2.56	55
Lon Warneke	21	88.1	4	5	3.16	30
Ray Prim	29	60.0	4	3	2.55	27
Dick Barrett	15	45.0	0	4	4.80	20
Paul Erickson	15	42.2	1	3	6.12	24
Walter Signer	4	25.0	2	1	2.88	5
Dale Alderson	4	14.0	0	1	6.43	4

==== Relief pitchers ====
Note: G = Games pitched; W = Wins; L = Losses; SV = Saves; ERA = Earned run average; SO = Strikeouts

Player	G	W	L	SV	ERA	SO
John Burrows	23	0	2	2	3.86	18
Bill Fleming	11	0	1	0	6.40	12
Jake Mooty	2	0	0	0	0.00	1

== Farm system ==
Level	Team	League	Manager
AA	Los Angeles Angels	Pacific Coast League	Bill Sweeney
B	Portsmouth Cubs	Piedmont League	Milt Stock
D	Erwin Aces	Appalachian League	Jim Poole
D	Lockport Cubs	PONY League	Roy Johnson

LEAGUE CHAMPIONS: Erwin
