= Ray Hamrick =

American baseball player (1921-2009)

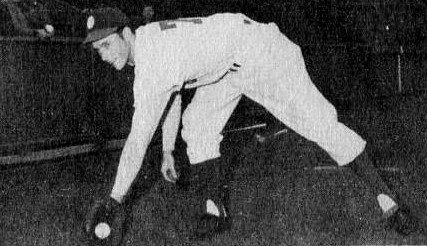
- Hamrick in 1947
- Shortstop / Second baseman
- Born: August 1, 1921; Nashville, Tennessee, U.S.
- Died: June 9, 2009 (aged 87); Nashville, Tennessee, U.S.
- Batted: Right Threw: Right

MLB debut
- August 1, 1943, for the Philadelphia Phillies

Last MLB appearance
- July 9, 1944, for the Philadelphia Phillies

MLB statistics
- Batting average: .204
- Runs scored: 34
- Runs batted in: 32
- On-base percentage: .258
- Slugging average: .248
- Games played: 118
- Stats at Baseball Reference

Teams
- Philadelphia Phillies (1943–1944)

Raymond Bernard Hamrick [Handsome Ray] (August 1, 1921 – June 9, 2009) was an American infielder in Major League Baseball who played from 1943 through 1944 for the Philadelphia Phillies of the National League. Listed at 5 ft 11 in (1.80 m), 165 lb., Hamrick batted and threw right-handed. He was born in Nashville, Tennessee.

Fast and steady, Hamrick was one of many ballplayers who interrupted their careers to serve during World War II. Hamrick started his professional baseball career as a shortstop and pitcher in 1939, playing for the Nashville, Charleston and Americus Minor league teams. During his stay at Americus, he made the All-Star team in 1941 and batted over a .300 batting average for most of the year. His most productive season came in 1943, when he hit 145 in 460 at-bats with Nashville for a .310 average.

Hamrick joined the Philadelphia Phillies in 1943. The following season, he began spring training with the team in Wilmington, Delaware, because the war kept the teams out of Florida for camp due to the submarine threat. Hamrick left spring training as Philadelphia's starting shortstop, but he left for the military service after appearing in 74 games. With the end of the war, Hamrick rejoined the team (by then the Phillies) in 1946, but the competition for a roster spot was now overwhelming as Skeeter Newsome became the everyday shortstop.

In a two-season majors career, Hamrick was a .204 hitter (92-for-452) in 118 games, including 34 runs, 32 RBI, 13 doubles, two triples, one home run and one stolen base. He made 74 appearances at shortstop (86) and second base (31), and posted a collective .946 fielding percentage.

After that, Hamrick hit .266 (92-for-346) for the Oakland Oaks of the Pacific Coast League in 1946, his last professional baseball season.

Hamrick died in his homeland of Nashville, Tennessee, at the age of 87.

== See also ==
- 1943 Philadelphia Phillies season
- 1944 Philadelphia Phillies season
