= Dale Matthewson =

American baseball player (1923-1984)

- Pitcher
- Born: May 15, 1923; Catasauqua, Pennsylvania, U.S.
- Died: February 20, 1984 (aged 60); Blairsville, Georgia, U.S.
- Batted: Right Threw: Right

MLB debut
- July 3, 1943, for the Philadelphia Phillies

Last MLB appearance
- July 30, 1944, for the Philadelphia Phillies

MLB statistics
- Win–loss record: 0–3
- Earned run average: 4.34
- Strikeouts: 16
- Stats at Baseball Reference

Teams
- Philadelphia Phillies (1943–1944)

Dale Wesley Matthewson (May 15, 1923 – February 20, 1984) was an American professional baseball player. He was a right-handed pitcher over parts of two seasons (1943–44) with the Philadelphia Phillies. For his career, he compiled an 0–3 record, with a 4.34 earned run average, and 16 strikeouts in 58 innings pitched.

Matthewson was born in Catasauqua, Pennsylvania and died in Blairsville, Georgia at the age of 60.
