= Dick Conger =

American baseball player (1921–1970)

- Pitcher
- Born: April 3, 1921; Los Angeles, California, U.S.
- Died: February 16, 1970 (aged 48); Los Angeles, California, U.S.
- Batted: Right Threw: Right

MLB debut
- April 22, 1940, for the Detroit Tigers

Last MLB appearance
- September 14, 1943, for the Philadelphia Phillies

MLB statistics
- Win–loss record: 3–7
- Earned run average: 5.14
- Strikeouts: 24
- Stats at Baseball Reference

Teams
- Detroit Tigers (1940); Pittsburgh Pirates (1941–1942); Philadelphia Phillies (1943)

Richard Conger (April 3, 1921 – February 16, 1970) was an American Major League Baseball (MLB) pitcher who played for the Detroit Tigers, Pittsburgh Pirates, and Philadelphia Phillies. His key pitch was the fastball.

== Early life ==
Conger was born in Los Angeles, California, and was Jewish. He attended Fremont High School in Los Angeles, for whom he played baseball, and as a sophomore won 17 consecutive games on the way to a City title. He also led the team to the City Championship in his senior year in 1938.

He then attended the University of California, Los Angeles, where Conger also played baseball. He lost only one game as a freshman for the UCLA Bruins, before signing with the Detroit Tigers in 1940.

== Baseball career ==
In the minor leagues, in 1943 with the Toronto Maple Leafs Conger was 11–6 with a 1.96 ERA (3rd in the International League). In 1944 with the Los Angeles Angels he was 13–7 with a 2.88 ERA, and 5 shutouts (tied for 7th in the Pacific Coast League).

Conger pitched in the major leagues from 1940 (when at 19 years of age he was the second-youngest player in the American League, behind Hal Newhouser) to 1943. In his major league career he was 3–7 with a 5.14 ERA, and four complete games.

From 1944 to 1946 Conger served in the Marine Corps during World War II.

After his major league career, Conger continued to play in the minor leagues, his last season being with the Sacramento Solons (PCL) and Oklahoma City Indians (Texas League) in 1950. He died at 48 years of age.

On June 26, 2011, Conger was inducted into the Southern California Jewish Sports Hall of Fame.
