= Les Webber =

American baseball player (1915–1986)

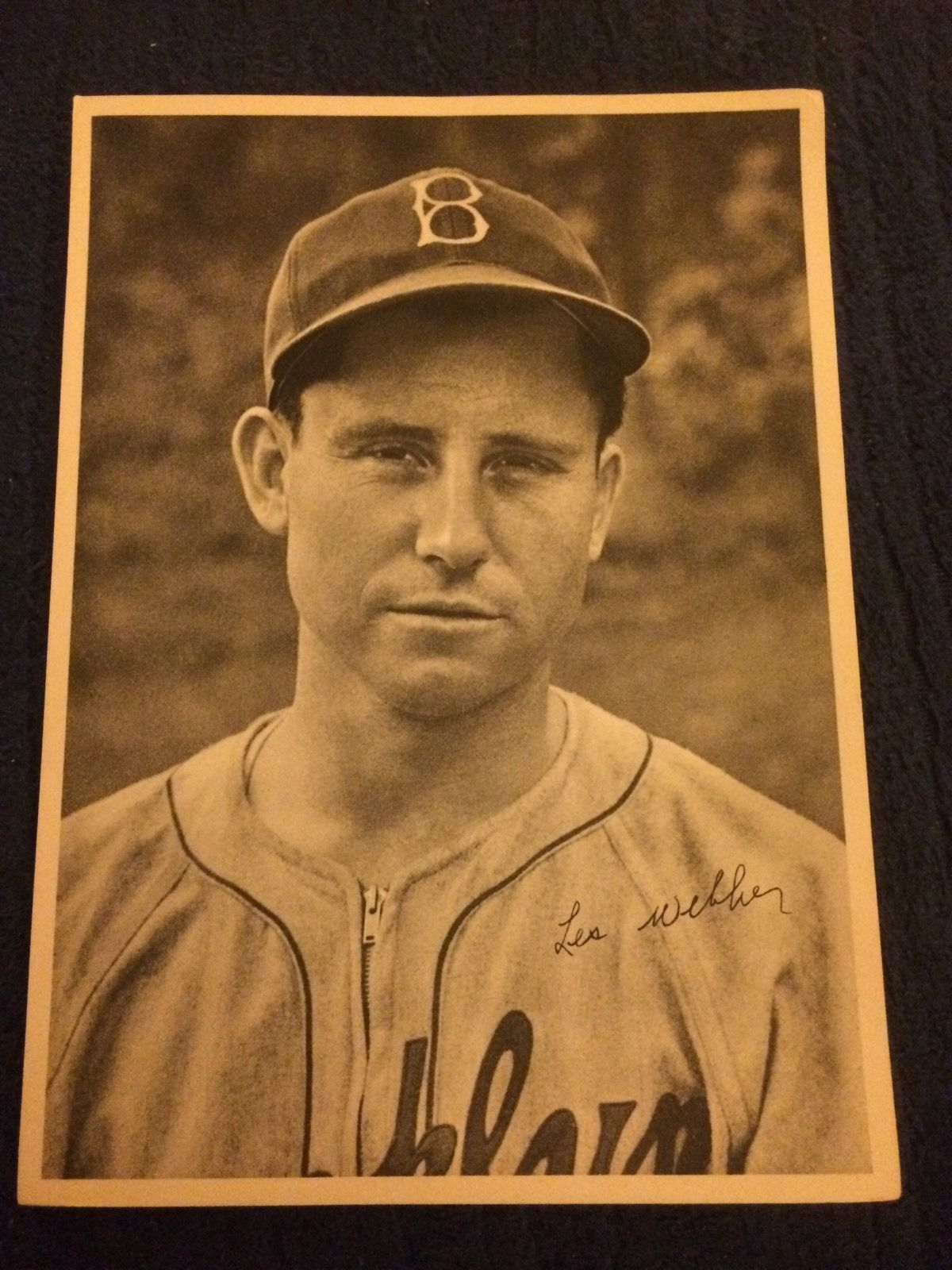
- Pitcher
- Born: May 6, 1915; Kelseyville, California, US
- Died: November 13, 1986 (aged 71); Santa Maria, California, US
- Batted: Right Threw: Right

MLB debut
- May 17, 1942, for the Brooklyn Dodgers

Last MLB appearance
- April 26, 1948, for the Cleveland Indians

MLB statistics
- Win–loss record: 23–19
- Earned run average: 4.19
- Strikeouts: 141
- Stats at Baseball Reference

Teams
- Brooklyn Dodgers (1942–1946); Cleveland Indians (1946, 1948)

Lester Elmer Webber (May 6, 1915 – November 13, 1986) was an American Major League Baseball right-handed pitcher who played for six seasons. He played for the Brooklyn Dodgers from 1942 to 1946 and the Cleveland Indians in 1946 and 1948. In 154 career games, Webber pitched 432 innings and had 23 wins, 19 losses, and a 4.19 earned run average (ERA).

Born in California, Webber began his professional career in Seattle in 1936, and spent the next six years in the minor leagues. He officially joined the Dodgers in 1942, and remained with them through the war years. He was primarily a relief pitcher for the Dodgers, and led the league in saves in 1943. The Dodgers attempted to make him a starting pitcher in 1945, but after World War II ended that year Webber became expendable. He was sent to the Indians, appearing in a handful of games for the team in 1946 and one in 1948. After two more seasons in the minors, he retired from professional play, turning to semi-pro baseball. He became a real estate broker after retiring from baseball, and died in 1986.

== Early life and career ==
Webber was born in Kelseyville, California. He began his professional career with the Seattle Indians of the Pacific Coast League (PCL) in 1936; he had been signed by Seattle after winning 18 straight games for a semi-professional baseball league in Canada. After a trial with them that year, he was sent to the Wenatchee Chiefs of the Western International League for the 1937 season, finishing the season with 21 wins, 6 losses, and 224 innings pitched over 31 games. He returned to Seattle for the 1938 season, and pitched in 14 games for the team that year. After Fred Hutchinson was promoted to the major leagues, Webber became a regular starting pitcher for Seattle in 1939. In 34 games, 22 of them starts, he had a 2.78 earned run average, 17 wins and 7 losses, five of which were by one run each. He was also named to the PCL All-Star Team. In 1940, he had 13 wins, 10 losses, and a 3.25 ERA in 33 games en route to Seattle winning the PCL title. The following season, Webber had his appendix removed, and ended up missing the first half of the season as a result. In 18 games, he had seven wins, three losses, and a 2.16 ERA, which led the PCL; he also helped Seattle win a second PCL title. As a result, the Brooklyn Dodgers selected him in the PCL rule 5 draft.

== MLB career ==
Webber made his major league debut on May 17, 1942, after making the team out of spring training, pitching eight innings in a 4–3 victory against the Chicago Cubs. After two more starting appearances, he was placed in the bullpen for the rest of the season. He finished the season with three wins, two losses, and a 2.96 ERA in 19 games. Entering the 1943 Brooklyn Dodgers season, Webber was slated to be the top reliever on the team, as he was classified as 4-F, meaning he would not be lost to the military during World War II, and manager Leo Durocher considered him particularly good at getting opposing batters to ground into double plays.

Through the first two months of the season he performed well in relief. On May 26, however, Webber had the worst outing of his career against the Pittsburgh Pirates. In a 17–4 loss, Webber pitched 1 2/3 innings in relief of Max Macon, and gave up nine walks and ten runs, making his ERA jump from 1.59 to 5.18. Durocher was criticized after the game for leaving Webber in as long as he did. Despite the poor outing, Webber remained in his role through the rest of the season. After an early August game against the St. Louis Cardinals, he was fined $100 for intentionally throwing at Stan Musial on two back-to-back pitches, which Durocher defended after claiming that he was not intentionally throwing, but simply throwing high and inside to Musial as he had told him to do. This was dismissed by Commissioner Ford Frick, as Webber had thrown at Musial before in 1941, when both were minor leaguers. Webber finished the season with two wins, two losses, a 3.81 ERA, and 10 saves, which led the National League. He appeared in 54 games for the Dodgers that year, a team record that stood until 1952 when it was broken by Joe Black.

Entering the 1944 Brooklyn Dodgers season, Webber remained the team's primary relief pitcher, leading the team again with 48 appearances throughout the season. His best outing of the year came on July 19 against the Cincinnati Reds, which saw him allow two hits and no runs over 5 1/3 innings in a 10–5 win. In one game during the season, he allowed four straight hits, and out of frustration covered the baseball with dirt and threw it to the next better with, according to Dodgers shortstop Bobby Bragan, "bits of dirt flying everywhere." Webber finished the year with seven wins, eight losses, and a 4.94 ERA over 140 1/3 innings. Despite struggling in 1944, Webber did not report to spring training until the end of March 1945 seeking a new contract; he eventually signed what had been offered by the Dodgers. In the first two months of the season, Webber was used sparingly, and as a result he was sent to the Montreal Royals of the International League to turn him into a possible starting pitcher; with them he won three games in the first eight days he was on the team. He returned to the Dodgers in August having posted an 11–3 record with the Royals, including ten straight wins, and a 1.88 ERA with Montreal and spent the final two months of the season as a starter with the Dodgers. In 17 games, 7 of them starts after his return, Webber finished the season with seven wins, three losses, and a 3.58 ERA.

In 1946, Webber remained on the major league roster, and was used as both a starter and reliever, but was used infrequently compared to earlier seasons, as players returning from war rejoined the Dodgers and took over their old positions. He pitched in 11 games through the first half of the season with three wins, three losses, and a 2.30 ERA. In early July, the Cleveland Indians purchased Webber from the Dodgers. In his first game with the Indians, he allowed four runs in the first inning without recording an out. After three more appearances with the team with a 23.63 ERA in those games, he was demoted to the Baltimore Orioles of the International League, playing in five games for them to end his season. In 1947, Webber was placed on the Indians' retired list due to a nagging arm injury, which kept him out of professional baseball for the year; as a result he played semi-professional baseball in an attempt to keep himself in shape. Due to his performance at the semi-pro level, the Indians gave him an invitation to spring training for the 1948 season. After playing in one game April 26 against the Chicago White Sox, the last of his career, Webber was sold alongside Catfish Metkovich to the Oakland Oaks of the Pacific Coast League.

== Later life ==
Webber spent the next two seasons with the Oakland Oaks. In 32 appearances for the Oaks in 1948, he had eight wins, five losses, and a 5.50 ERA. The following year, after pitching in one game, Webber requested his release from the Oaks, and joined a semi-professional team in Santa Maria, California, ending his professional baseball career. After retiring from baseball, he spent the next 35 years as a real estate broker. He died in Santa Maria on November 13, 1986, at the age of 71.

== See also ==
- List of Major League Baseball annual saves leaders
