= Charlie Fuchs =

American baseball player (1913–1969)

- Pitcher
- Born: November 18, 1913; Union Hill, New Jersey, US
- Died: June 10, 1969 (aged 55); Weehawken, New Jersey, US
- Batted: Switch Threw: Right

MLB debut
- April 17, 1942, for the Detroit Tigers

Last MLB appearance
- August 5, 1944, for the Brooklyn Dodgers

MLB statistics
- Win–loss record: 6–10
- Earned run average: 4.89
- Strikeouts: 41
- Stats at Baseball Reference

Teams
- Detroit Tigers (1942); Philadelphia Phillies (1943); St. Louis Browns (1943); Brooklyn Dodgers (1944)

Charles Thomas Fuchs (November 18, 1913 – June 10, 1969) was an American Major League Baseball pitcher for the Detroit Tigers (1942), Philadelphia Phillies (1943), St. Louis Browns (1943), and Brooklyn Dodgers (1944). The 5 ft 8 in (1.73 m), 168 lb (76 kg) left-hander was a native of Union Hill, New Jersey (now part of Union City, New Jersey).

Fuchs is one of many ballplayers who only appeared in the major leagues during World War II. Making his major league debut in relief on April 17, 1942, against the St. Louis Browns at Sportsman's Park, his first major league win came just two days later. He started the second game of a doubleheader against the same St. Louis Browns and pitched a 1–0 complete game shutout.

In three seasons Fuchs appeared in a total of 47 games and had a 6–10 record, 13 starts, 5 complete games, 2 shutouts, 13 games finished, and 1 save. He allowed 90 earned runs in 165 2/3 innings pitched for a final ERA of 4.89. He was not a good hitter (3-for-43...an .070 batting average), but he was a competent fielder, handling 50 of 52 total chances successfully for a fielding percentage of .962.

Fuchs died at the age of 56 in Weehawken, New Jersey.
