= 1943 St. Louis Cardinals season =

Major League Baseball season

1943 St. Louis Cardinals
- National League champions
- League: National League
- Ballpark: Sportsman's Park
- City: St. Louis, Missouri
- Record: 105–49 (.682)
- League place: 1st
- Owners: Sam Breadon
- Managers: Billy Southworth
- Radio: KWK (Dizzy Dean, Johnny O'Hara); KXOK (France Laux, Ron Rawson)

The 1943 St. Louis Cardinals season was the team's 62nd season in St. Louis, Missouri and the 52nd season in the National League. The Cardinals went 105–49 during the season and finished first in the National League. In the World Series, they met the New York Yankees. They lost the series in 5 games.

== Offseason ==
- November 7, 1942: Hal Epps was drafted from the Cardinals by the St. Louis Browns in the 1942 minor league draft.
- November 24, 1942: Gerry Staley was drafted by the Cardinals from the Boise Pilots in the 1942 minor league draft.

== Regular season ==
Outfielder Stan Musial won the MVP Award this year, batting .357, with 13 home runs and 81 RBIs. This was the second consecutive year a Cardinal won the MVP award, with Mort Cooper having won the award the previous season.

=== Season standings ===
National League
| Team | W | L | Pct. | GB | Home | Road |
|---|---|---|---|---|---|---|
| St. Louis Cardinals | 105 | 49 | .682 | — | 58‍–‍21 | 47‍–‍28 |
| Cincinnati Reds | 87 | 67 | .565 | 18 | 48‍–‍29 | 39‍–‍38 |
| Brooklyn Dodgers | 81 | 72 | .529 | 23½ | 46‍–‍31 | 35‍–‍41 |
| Pittsburgh Pirates | 80 | 74 | .519 | 25 | 47‍–‍30 | 33‍–‍44 |
| Chicago Cubs | 74 | 79 | .484 | 30½ | 36‍–‍38 | 38‍–‍41 |
| Boston Braves | 68 | 85 | .444 | 36½ | 38‍–‍39 | 30‍–‍46 |
| Philadelphia Phillies | 64 | 90 | .416 | 41 | 33‍–‍43 | 31‍–‍47 |
| New York Giants | 55 | 98 | .359 | 49½ | 34‍–‍43 | 21‍–‍55 |

=== Record vs. opponents ===
1943 National League record Sources:
| Team | BSN | BRO | CHC | CIN | NYG | PHI | PIT | STL |
|---|---|---|---|---|---|---|---|---|
| Boston | — | 12–9 | 8–14 | 11–11 | 11–11 | 11–11 | 12–10 | 3–19 |
| Brooklyn | 9–12 | — | 10–12 | 13–9 | 14–8 | 17–5 | 11–11 | 7–15 |
| Chicago | 14–8 | 12–10 | — | 9–13 | 12–9–1 | 10–12 | 8–14 | 9–13 |
| Cincinnati | 11–11 | 9–13 | 13–9 | — | 16–6–1 | 19–3 | 9–13 | 10–12 |
| New York | 11–11 | 8–14 | 9–12–1 | 6–16–1 | — | 8–14–1 | 9–13 | 4–18 |
| Philadelphia | 11–11 | 5–17 | 12–10 | 3–19 | 14–8–1 | — | 10–12–1 | 9–13–1 |
| Pittsburgh | 10–12 | 11–11 | 14–8 | 13–9 | 13–9 | 12–10–1 | — | 7–15–2 |
| St. Louis | 19–3 | 15–7 | 13–9 | 12–10 | 18–4 | 13–9–1 | 15–7–2 | — |

=== Roster ===
1943 St. Louis Cardinals
Roster
| Pitchers: 11 Al Brazle; 31 Harry Brecheen; 27 Bud Byerly; 13 Mort Cooper; 22 Murry Dickson; 19 Harry Gumbert; 29 Howie Krist; 23,21 Max Lanier; 18 Red Munger; 11 Howie Pollet; 28 Ernie White | Catchers: 15 Walker Cooper; 32 Sam Narron; 16 Ken O'Dea; Infielders: 3 Jimmy Brown; 7 George Fallon; 2 Lou Klein; 1 Whitey Kurowski; 4 Marty Marion; 5 Ray Sanders | Outfielders: 8 Buster Adams; 17 Frank Demaree; 9 Debs Garms; 12 Johnny Hopp; 8 Danny Litwhiler; 6 Stan Musial; 20 Coaker Triplett; 10 Harry Walker | Manager: 30 Billy Southworth; Coaches: 25 Mike González (Third base); 26 Buzzy Wares |

== Player stats ==
| = Indicates team leader |

=== Batting ===
==== Starters by position ====
Note: Pos = Position; G = Games played; AB = At bats; H = Hits; Avg. = Batting average; HR = Home runs; RBI = Runs batted in

| Pos | Player | G | AB | H | Avg. | HR | RBI |
|---|---|---|---|---|---|---|---|
| C | Walker Cooper | 122 | 449 | 143 | .318 | 9 | 81 |
| 1B | Ray Sanders | 144 | 478 | 134 | .280 | 11 | 73 |
| 2B | Lou Klein | 154 | 627 | 180 | .287 | 7 | 62 |
| SS | Marty Marion | 129 | 418 | 117 | .280 | 1 | 52 |
| 3B | Whitey Kurowski | 139 | 522 | 150 | .287 | 13 | 70 |
| OF | Stan Musial | 157 | 617 | 220 | .357 | 13 | 81 |
| OF | Harry Walker | 148 | 564 | 166 | .294 | 2 | 53 |
| OF | Danny Litwhiler | 80 | 258 | 72 | .279 | 7 | 31 |

==== Other batters ====
Note: G = Games played; AB = At bats; H = Hits; Avg. = Batting average; HR = Home runs; RBI = Runs batted in

| Player | G | AB | H | Avg. | HR | RBI |
|---|---|---|---|---|---|---|
| Debs Garms | 90 | 249 | 64 | .257 | 0 | 22 |
| Johnny Hopp | 91 | 241 | 54 | .224 | 2 | 25 |
| Ken O'Dea | 71 | 203 | 57 | .281 | 3 | 25 |
| Jimmy Brown | 34 | 110 | 20 | .182 | 0 | 8 |
| Frank Demaree | 39 | 86 | 25 | .291 | 0 | 9 |
| George Fallon | 36 | 78 | 18 | .231 | 0 | 5 |
| Coaker Triplett | 9 | 25 | 2 | .080 | 1 | 4 |
| Buster Adams | 8 | 11 | 1 | .091 | 0 | 1 |
| Sam Narron | 10 | 11 | 1 | .091 | 0 | 0 |

=== Pitching ===
==== Starting pitchers ====
Note: G = Games pitched; IP = Innings pitched; W = Wins; L = Losses; ERA = Earned run average; SO = Strikeouts

| Player | G | IP | W | L | ERA | SO |
|---|---|---|---|---|---|---|
| Mort Cooper | 37 | 274.0 | 21 | 8 | 2.30 | 141 |
| Max Lanier | 32 | 213.1 | 15 | 7 | 1.90 | 123 |
| Harry Gumbert | 21 | 133.0 | 10 | 5 | 2.84 | 40 |
| Howie Pollet | 16 | 118.1 | 8 | 4 | 1.75 | 61 |
| Al Brazle | 13 | 88.0 | 8 | 2 | 1.53 | 26 |
| Ernie White | 14 | 78.2 | 5 | 5 | 3.78 | 28 |
| Bud Byerly | 2 | 13.0 | 1 | 0 | 3.46 | 6 |

==== Other pitchers ====
Note: G = Games pitched; IP = Innings pitched; W = Wins; L = Losses; ERA = Earned run average; SO = Strikeouts

| Player | G | IP | W | L | ERA | SO |
|---|---|---|---|---|---|---|
| Howie Krist | 34 | 164.1 | 11 | 5 | 2.90 | 57 |
| Harry Brecheen | 29 | 135.1 | 9 | 6 | 2.26 | 68 |

Note: Harry Brecheen was the team leader in saves with 4.

==== Relief pitchers ====
Note: G = Games pitched; W = Wins; L = Losses; SV = Saves; ERA = Earned run average; SO = Strikeouts

| Player | G | W | L | SV | ERA | SO |
|---|---|---|---|---|---|---|
| Red Munger | 32 | 9 | 5 | 2 | 3.95 | 45 |
| Murry Dickson | 31 | 8 | 2 | 0 | 3.58 | 44 |

== 1943 World Series ==
AL New York Yankees (4) vs. NL St. Louis Cardinals (1)

| Game | Score | Date | Location | Attendance |
|---|---|---|---|---|
| 1 | Cardinals – 2, Yankees – 4 | October 5 | Yankee Stadium | 68,676 |
| 2 | Cardinals – 4, Yankees – 3 | October 6 | Yankee Stadium | 68,578 |
| 3 | Cardinals – 2, Yankees – 6 | October 7 | Yankee Stadium | 69,990 |
| 4 | Yankees – 2, Cardinals – 1 | October 10 | Sportsman's Park | 36,196 |
| 5 | Yankees – 2, Cardinals – 0 | October 11 | Sportsman's Park | 33,872 |

== Awards and records ==
- Stan Musial, National League leader, Triples, (20).

== Farm system ==
| Level | Team | League | Manager |
|---|---|---|---|
| AA | Columbus Red Birds | American Association | Nick Cullop |
| AA | Rochester Red Wings | International League | Pepper Martin |
| AA | Sacramento Solons | Pacific Coast League | Ken Penner |
| B | Allentown Wings | Interstate League | Barney Roth, Herb Brett and Tom Koval |
| B | Lynchburg Cardinals | Piedmont League | Ollie Vanek |
| D | Johnson City Cardinals | Appalachian League | Ken Blackman |
| D | Jamestown Falcons | PONY League | Jack Sanford |

LEAGUE CHAMPIONS: Columbus
