= Roger McKee =

American baseball player (1926–2014)

- Pitcher
- Born: September 16, 1926; Shelby, North Carolina, U.S.
- Died: September 1, 2014 (aged 87); Shelby, North Carolina, U.S.
- Batted: Left Threw: Left

MLB debut
- August 18, 1943, for the Philadelphia Phillies

Last MLB appearance
- September 26, 1944, for the Philadelphia Phillies

MLB statistics
- Win–loss record: 1–0
- Earned run average: 5.87
- Strikeouts: 1
- Stats at Baseball Reference

Teams
- Philadelphia Phillies (1943–1944)

Roger Hornsby McKee (September 16, 1926 – September 1, 2014) was an American Major League Baseball pitcher who played from 1943–44 for the Philadelphia Phillies while still a teenager.

== Early life ==
Roger McKee was born in Shelby, North Carolina in September 16, 1926, just a few weeks before his namesake, Rogers Hornsby, led the St. Louis Cardinals to victory in the 1926 World Series. (While McKee was usually called "Rogers", with a final "s", official records such as his World War II draft registration card and the 1940 Census indicate that he was given the more common first name, Roger.)

== Baseball career ==
Desperate for players, as many had gone off to war, the Phillies took a flyer on the 16-year-old McKee in 1943; he was the youngest player to appear in a National League game that season. He made his major league debut on August 18, 1943, in a home doubleheader against the St. Louis Cardinals at Shibe Park. On October 3, 1943, the last day of the season, McKee started the second game of a doubleheader against the Pittsburgh Pirates at Forbes Field and pitched a complete game, winning 11–3. 17 years and 17 days old at the time, McKee thus became the youngest pitcher in baseball history to be credited with a win and to throw a nine-inning complete-game victory; no pitcher as young as McKee has accomplished this since.

In 1944, the then-17-year-old pitcher spent most the season with the Wilmington Blue Rocks, batting .225 as a first baseman and going 6-8 with a 4.25 ERA on the mound. But with the war still on, McKee got another chance to pitch in the majors; on September 26, 1944, he appeared in a contest against the Chicago Cubs in which Philadelphia was already trailing, 14-0. McKee tossed the final two innings of the game, allowing only one additional run; it would be his last MLB contest. Overall, he posted a 1–0 record and a 5.87 earned run average in five games (one start), allowing 10 runs on 14 hits and six walks, while striking out one in 15 1/3 innings of work.

McKee was in the Navy in 1945, but returned to baseball the following year to play with the Phillies farm club in Terre Haute. He later switched to the outfield, but never returned to the big leagues, spending nine seasons in the minors through 1957, collecting a batting average of .287 and 115 home runs in 1,173 games.

In 2014, Roger McKee died in his hometown of Shelby, North Carolina, 15 days short before of his 88th birthday.
