= Al Gerheauser =

American baseball player (1917–1972)

- Pitcher
- Born: June 24, 1917; St. Louis, Missouri, U.S.
- Died: May 28, 1972 (aged 54); Springfield, Missouri, U.S.
- Batted: Left Threw: Left

MLB debut
- April 24, 1943, for the Philadelphia Phillies

Last MLB appearance
- October 3, 1948, for the St. Louis Browns

MLB statistics
- Win–loss record: 25–50
- Earned run average: 4.13
- Strikeouts: 255
- Stats at Baseball Reference

Teams
- Philadelphia Phillies (1943–1944); Pittsburgh Pirates (1945–1946); St. Louis Browns (1948)

Albert "Lefty" Gerheauser (June 24, 1917 – May 28, 1972) was an American professional baseball player who pitched in the Major Leagues for five seasons (1943-46 and 1948), for the Philadelphia Phillies, Pittsburgh Pirates and St. Louis Browns. He played in the minor leagues for eight seasons, mainly in the New York Yankees' system, before making the major leagues.

As of 2024, he was the last player who made his major league debut on Opening Day as a starting pitcher.
