= Garton del Savio =

American baseball player (1913–2006)

Garton DelSavio
- Shortstop
- Born: November 26, 1913; New York City, US
- Died: November 9, 2006 (aged 92); Blauvelt, New York, US
- Batted: Right Threw: Right

MLB debut
- April 24, 1943, for the Philadelphia Phillies

Last MLB appearance
- April 29, 1943, for the Philadelphia Phillies

MLB statistics
- Batting average: .091
- Home runs: 0
- RBI: 0
- Stats at Baseball Reference

Teams
- Philadelphia Phillies (1943)

Garton Orville del Savio (November 26, 1913 – November 9, 2006) was an American shortstop in Major League Baseball who played four games in 1943 for the Philadelphia Phillies, collecting a single in 11 at bats and committing three errors.

Del Savio came up through the Cincinnati Reds system in the mid-1930s, playing for various teams in the Middle Atlantic League and the Southern Association. After sitting out the 1942 season, Del Salvio made the Phillies roster after spring training. After his brief stint in the majors, del Savio was sent back down to the Syracuse Chiefs of the International League for the remainder of the 1943 season, where he appeared in 148 games and hit .240.

He enlisted in the Coast Guard during World War II. His final season of professional baseball was in 1946, splitting time between the Chiefs and the Birmingham Barons of the Southern Association, hitting only .201.

Born in New York City, del Savio was 29 years old at the time of his brief big league career. He died at age 92 in Blauvelt, New York.
