= Bill Webb (pitcher) =

American baseball player (1913-1994)

- Pitcher
- Born: December 12, 1913; Atlanta, Georgia, U.S.
- Died: June 1, 1994 (aged 80); Austell, Georgia, U.S.
- Batted: Right Threw: Right

MLB debut
- May 15, 1943, for the Philadelphia Phillies

Last MLB appearance
- May 15, 1943, for the Philadelphia Phillies

MLB statistics
- Games: 1
- Innings pitched: 1
- Win–loss record: 0–0
- Earned run average: 9.00
- Stats at Baseball Reference

Teams
- Philadelphia Phillies (1943)

Willie Fred "Bill" Webb (December 12, 1913 – June 1, 1994) was an American professional baseball pitcher. Webb played for the Philadelphia Phillies in 1943. In one career game, he had a 0–0 record with a 9.00 ERA. He batted and threw right-handed.

Webb was born in Atlanta, Georgia, and died in Austell, Georgia.
