= George Eyrich =

American baseball player (1925-2006)

- Pitcher
- Born: March 3, 1925; Reading, Pennsylvania, U.S.
- Died: June 25, 2006 (aged 81); Reading, Pennsylvania, U.S.
- Batted: Right Threw: Right

MLB debut
- June 13, 1943, for the Philadelphia Phillies

Last appearance
- August 29, 1943, for the Philadelphia Phillies

MLB statistics
- Win–loss record: 0–0
- Earned run average: 3.38
- Strikeouts: 5
- Stats at Baseball Reference

Teams
- Philadelphia Phillies (1943)

George Lincoln Eyrich (March 3, 1925 – June 25, 2006) was an American Major League Baseball pitcher who played for the Philadelphia Phillies in 1943. At 18 years of age, the 5 ft 11 in (1.80 m), 175 lb (79 kg) rookie was the fourth-youngest player to appear in a National League game that season.

Eyrich is one of many ballplayers who only appeared in the major leagues during World War II. He served in the United States Navy aboard the SS Elwood Haynes during the Battle of Leyte Gulf and later aboard a transport ship.

He made his major league debut on June 13, 1943, in a road doubleheader against the New York Giants at the Polo Grounds.

Eyrich appeared in a total of nine games, all in relief, with six games finished in 1943 for the Philadelphia Phillies. Even though he allowed 36 baserunners (27 hits and 9 walks) in just 18 2/3 innings pitched, he gave up only seven earned runs. His short career ended with a 0–0 record and a 3.38 ERA.

Eyrich was born and died in Reading, Pennsylvania.
