= Dutch Dietz =

American baseball player (1912–1972)

- Pitcher
- Born: February 12, 1912; Cincinnati, Ohio, U.S.
- Died: October 29, 1972 (aged 60); Beaumont, Texas, U.S.
- Batted: Right Threw: Right

MLB debut
- April 26, 1940, for the Pittsburgh Pirates

Last MLB appearance
- July 29, 1943, for the Philadelphia Phillies

MLB statistics
- Win–loss record: 14–16
- Earned run average: 3.87
- Strikeouts: 79
- Stats at Baseball Reference

Teams
- Pittsburgh Pirates (1940–1943); Philadelphia Phillies (1943)

Lloyd Arthur "Dutch" Dietz (February 12, 1912 – October 29, 1972) was a major-league (MLB) pitcher from 1940 to 1943. He began his MLB career with the Pittsburgh Pirates and was traded to the Philadelphia Phillies in his final season.
