= Johnnie Wittig =

American baseball player (1914–1999)

- Pitcher
- Born: June 16, 1914; Baltimore, Maryland, U.S.
- Died: February 24, 1999 (aged 84); Nassawadox, Virginia, U.S.
- Batted: Right Threw: Right

MLB debut
- August 4, 1938, for the New York Giants

Last MLB appearance
- June 22, 1949, for the Boston Red Sox

MLB statistics
- Win–loss record: 10–25
- Earned run average: 4.89
- Strikeouts: 121
- Stats at Baseball Reference

Teams
- New York Giants (1938–1939; 1941; 1943); Boston Red Sox (1949)

John Carl Wittig (June 16, 1914 – February 24, 1999), nicknamed "Hans", was an American professional baseball pitcher. He played all or part of five seasons in Major League Baseball between 1938 and 1949 for the New York Giants (1938–39, 1941, 1943) and Boston Red Sox (1949). Listed at 6 ft (1.83 m), 180 lb (82 kg), Wittig batted and threw right-handed. He was born in Baltimore, Maryland, to German immigrants.

Over a five-season-career, Wittig posted a 10–25 record with a 4.89 ERA in 84 appearances, including 39 starts, seven complete games, one shutout, four saves, 121 strikeouts, 163 walks, and 307 1/3 innings of work.

Wittig died in Nassawadox, Virginia, at the age of 84.
