= Rube Fischer =

American baseball player

- Pitcher
- Born: September 19, 1916; Carlock, South Dakota, U.S.
- Died: July 16, 1997 (aged 80); Green Bay, Wisconsin, U.S.
- Batted: Right Threw: Right

MLB debut
- September 12, 1941, for the New York Giants

Last MLB appearance
- July 14, 1946, for the New York Giants

MLB statistics
- Win–loss record: 16–34
- Earned run average: 5.10
- Strikeouts: 136
- Stats at Baseball Reference

Teams
- New York Giants (1941, 1943–1946)

Reuben Walter Fischer (September 19, 1916 – July 16, 1997) was an American professional baseball player and right-handed pitcher who appeared in 108 games in Major League Baseball for the New York Giants (1941; 1943–1946). Born in Carlock, South Dakota, he threw and batted right-handed, stood 6 feet 4 inches (1.93 m) tall and weighed 190 pounds (86 kg).

Fischer began his minor-league career in 1937, spending a year in the Detroit Tigers' organization before being acquired by the Giants. Four years later, in September 1941, he made his MLB debut. He appeared in two games, a scoreless relief effort against the Cincinnati Reds on September 12, then a start against the Boston Braves eight days later—which resulted in a complete game, 7–3 victory.

The United States' entry into World War II in December 1941 began a depletion of MLB playing talent as athletes were called into the military. But Fischer did not return to the majors until June 1943, spending 11/2 years in the high minors. He was a member of the Giants' pitching staff from mid-June 1943 to mid-July 1946, as both a starter and reliever. His statistics were poor: counting his 1941 trial, he won only 16 of 50 decisions with a subpar 5.10 earned run average. In his 108 appearances and 3822/3 career innings pitched, Fischer permitted 416 hits, 222 bases on balls, and 217 earned runs. He was credited with 136 strikeouts and four saves. In 41 games started, he threw seven complete games and one shutout, a five-hit, 8–0 blanking of Cincinnati on July 30, 1944, in which he helped his cause with three runs batted in.

Fischer returned to the minors in mid-1946, played through 1949, then—after a seven-year hiatus—made a brief comeback at age 40 in the Class A Western League in 1957, appearing in four games. He died in Ashwaubenon, a village of Green Bay, Wisconsin, in 1997 at age 80.
