= Jack Kraus =

American baseball player (1918-1976)

- Pitcher
- Born: April 26, 1918; San Antonio, Texas, U.S.
- Died: January 2, 1976 (aged 57); San Antonio, Texas, U.S.
- Batted: Right Threw: Left

MLB debut
- April 25, 1943, for the Philadelphia Phillies

Last MLB appearance
- September 11, 1946, for the New York Giants

MLB statistics
- Win–loss record: 15–25
- Earned run average: 4.00
- Strikeouts: 83
- Stats at Baseball Reference

Teams
- Philadelphia Phillies (1943, 1945); New York Giants (1946)

John William Kraus (April 26, 1918 – January 2, 1976) was an American professional baseball pitcher who appeared in Major League Baseball in 70 games for the Philadelphia Phillies (1943 and 1945) and New York Giants (1946). In 1944, Kraus served in the United States Army during World War II.

Kraus, born in San Antonio, Texas, was a left-hander listed as 6 feet 4 inches (1.93 m) tall and 190 pounds (86 kg). His pro career extended for 14 seasons (1936–1943 and 1945–1950). His rookie season in the majors, 1943, was his finest; he posted a losing, 9–15 won–lost record for a Philadelphia team that finished at 64–90, but he compiled a solid 3.16 earned run average in 1992/3 innings pitched. He threw ten complete games in 25 starts, including a shutout, and was credited with two saves—the only complete games, shutouts and saves of his MLB career. When he returned to the Phils from the Army in 1945 he was much less effective, dropping nine of 13 decisions and putting up a mediocre 5.40 ERA. The following year, as a Giant, he was almost exclusively a relief pitcher; appearing in 17 games, he won two and lost one, but his ERA continued to climb, to 6.12. He returned to the minor leagues for the rest of his pro career.

In his 70 games pitched, 39 started, he lost 15 of 40 decisions and posted an ERA of 4.00. In 3061/3 innings pitched, he allowed 318 hits, 133 bases on balls, and 136 earned runs; he fanned 83. He died in San Antonio, aged 57, on January 2, 1976.
