= Ed Head =

American baseball player (1918-1980)

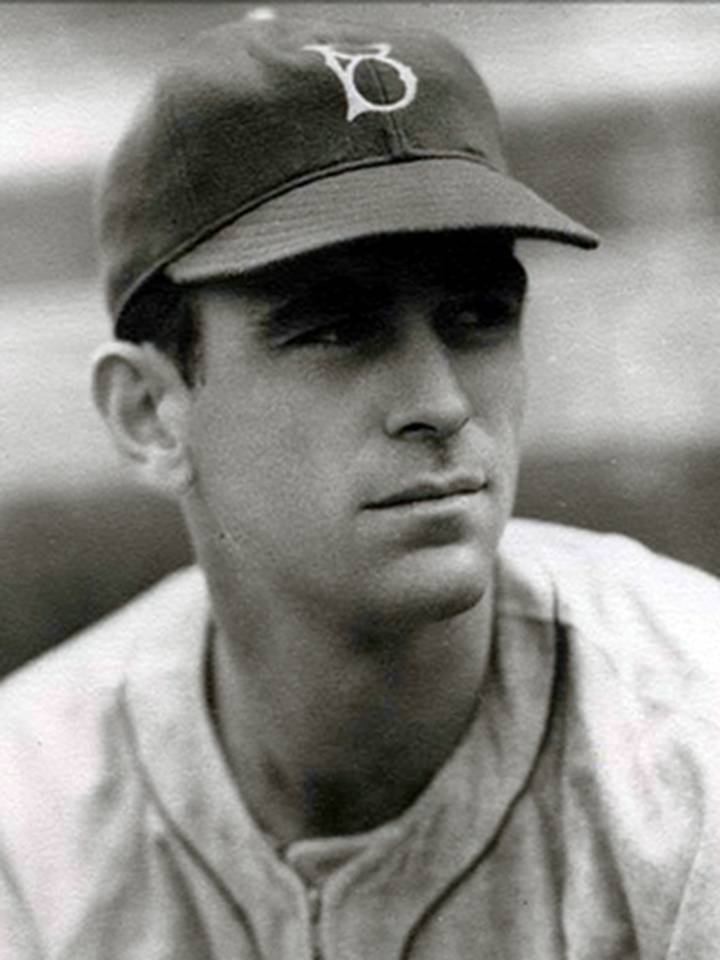
- Pitcher
- Born: January 25, 1918; Grant Parish, Louisiana, U.S.
- Died: January 31, 1980 (aged 62); Bastrop, Louisiana, U.S.
- Batted: Right Threw: Right

MLB debut
- July 27, 1940, for the Brooklyn Dodgers

Last MLB appearance
- August 25, 1946, for the Brooklyn Dodgers

MLB statistics
- Win–loss record: 27–23
- Earned run average: 3.48
- Strikeouts: 208
- Stats at Baseball Reference

Teams
- Brooklyn Dodgers (1940, 1942–1944, 1946)

Career highlights and awards
- Pitched a no-hitter on April 23, 1946

Edward Marvin Head (January 25, 1918 – January 31, 1980) was an American professional baseball player who pitched in the Major Leagues from 1940 to 1946.

Head was notable for a number of reasons, one of them was the physical challenges he overcame to become a major league baseball player. A natural left-handed pitcher, at the age of 15, Head was involved in a vehicle accident that killed his girlfriend and almost resulted in the amputation of his left arm. After hours of surgery, Head's arm was saved but he could no longer use it to pitch, so he switched and became a right handed pitcher.

Head joined the Brooklyn Dodgers in 1940 and after compiling a record of 1–2, was sent back to the minor leagues for additional development. He returned in 1942 and was promoted to the team's starting rotation where he went 10–6 for the season. In 1943, he was not as effective, his record was 9–10, but he recovered in 1944 starting the season 4–3 with a career low ERA of 2.70 before he entered the Army to fulfill his service obligation.

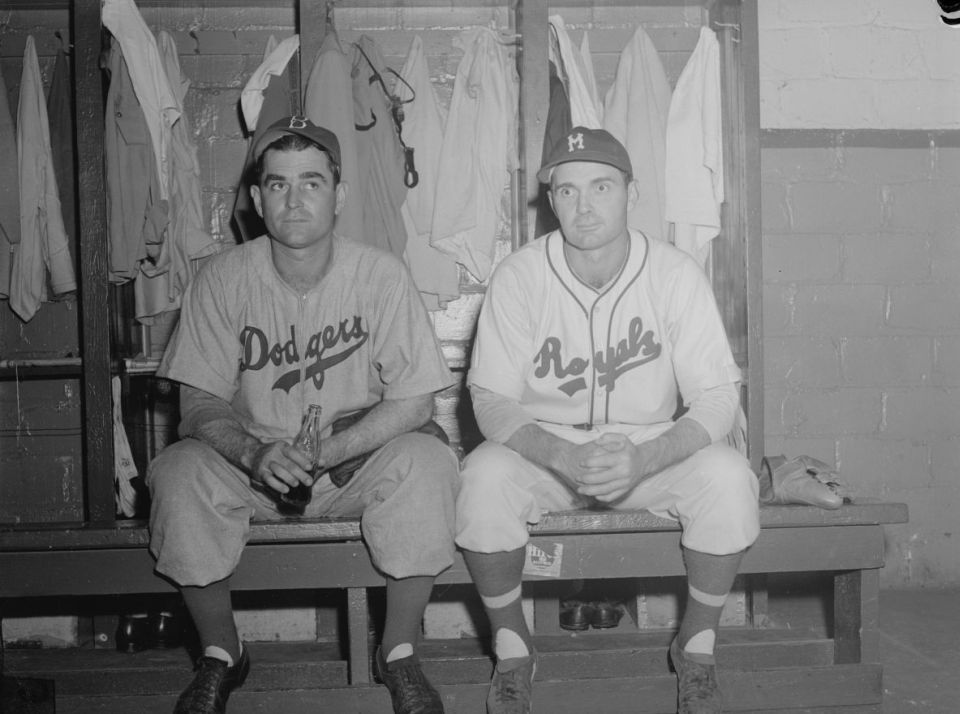
Ed Head (left) with Lew Riggs (right) in Montreal, 1946

After serving in the Army and not pitching in the majors for most of 1944 and all of 1945, Head no-hit the Boston Braves 5–0 at Ebbets Field on April 23, 1946, in his first start of the season. Several weeks later, Head injured his right arm and did not pitch for the remainder of the season. He failed to make the major league club in spring training of 1947, and never pitched in the majors again, his no-hitter being one of the last games he ever pitched.

Head managed the Asheville Tourists minor league baseball club in 1949.

Head died on January 31, 1980, at age 62.

== See also ==
- List of Major League Baseball no-hitters

Achievements
Preceded by Dick Fowler	No-hitter pitcher April 23, 1946	Succeeded by Bob Feller
Sporting positions
Preceded by Curt Davis	Brooklyn Dodgers Opening Day; Starting pitcher 1943	Succeeded by Hal Gregg
