= Newt Kimball =

American baseball player (1915–2001)

- Pitcher
- Born: March 27, 1915; Logan, Utah, U.S.
- Died: March 22, 2001 (aged 85); Las Vegas, Nevada, U.S.
- Batted: Right Threw: Right

MLB debut
- May 7, 1937, for the Chicago Cubs

Last MLB appearance
- September 23, 1943, for the Philadelphia Phillies

MLB statistics
- Win–loss record: 11–9
- Earned run average: 3.78
- Strikeouts: 88
- Stats at Baseball Reference

Teams
- Chicago Cubs (1937–1938); St. Louis Cardinals (1940); Brooklyn Dodgers (1940–1943); Philadelphia Phillies (1943)

Newell Whitney Kimball (March 27, 1915 – March 22, 2001) was an American right-handed pitcher in Major League Baseball.

Born in Logan, Utah, Kimball was listed as 6 feet 2 inches (1.88 m) tall and 190 pounds (86 kg). After attending Santa Monica High School in Southern California, he was signed by the Chicago Cubs in 1934, winning twenty games for their Class C Ponca City Angels affiliate as a nineteen-year-old. He worked his way up the Cubs chain, eventually being called up late in both the 1937 and 1938 seasons, before Chicago returned him to the minors in 1939. In 1940, the Cubs dealt Kimball to the Brooklyn Dodgers, who used him mainly in relief through 1943. He would appear in two games for the St. Louis Cardinals in 1940 and a partial season for the 1943 Philadelphia Phillies before heading back to the Pacific Coast League.

After three seasons with the PCL Hollywood Stars, Kimball was hired by the Boston Braves in 1947 to manage their new Class D club, the Las Vegas Wranglers. The club finished third in the six-team Sunset League, and Kimball (despite a 14–5 record on the mound and a .361 batting average), was let go as both player and manager at season's end. Taking a liking to Las Vegas, he stayed in town and took over the helm for the 1951 Wranglers, now playing in the Southwest International League. After a 72–71 finish, Kimball left professional baseball after a 15-year career.

Kimball died in Las Vegas in 2001, just a few days shy of his 86th birthday.
