= Johnny Allen (baseball) =

American baseball player (1904–1959)

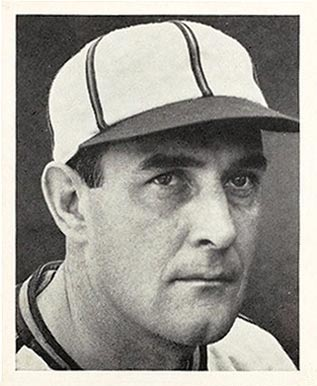
- Pitcher
- Born: September 30, 1904 Lenoir, North Carolina, U.S.
- Died: March 29, 1959 (aged 54) St. Petersburg, Florida, U.S.
- Batted: Right Threw: Right

MLB debut
- April 19, 1932, for the New York Yankees

Last MLB appearance
- September 26, 1944, for the New York Giants

MLB statistics
- Win–loss record: 142–75
- Earned run average: 3.75
- Strikeouts: 1,070
- Stats at Baseball Reference

Teams
- New York Yankees (1932–1935); Cleveland Indians (1936–1940); St. Louis Browns (1941); Brooklyn Dodgers (1941–1943); New York Giants (1943–1944)

Career highlights and awards
- All-Star (1938); World Series champion (1932)

John Thomas Allen (September 30, 1904 – March 29, 1959) was an American pitcher in Major League Baseball (MLB), who played for the New York Yankees, Cleveland Indians, St. Louis Browns, Brooklyn Dodgers, and New York Giants.

== Early life ==
Allen was born in Lenoir, North Carolina, to Robert L. Allen and Almyra G. Allen, and had three siblings. His father was the Chief of Police in Lenoir, and died of appendicitis in Johnny's childhood. Because his mother was unable to support all of the children, Allen spent part of his youth in the Baptist orphanage in Thomasville, North Carolina, where he began to play baseball. At the orphanage, Allen was allowed to own a shotgun, and lost two toes on his right foot after an accidental discharge. He later attended Thomasville High School. Upon graduating high school, Allen left the orphanage on June 22, 1922, and soon began working in a variety of hotels as a bellhop or clerk, including first the O. Henry Hotel in Greensboro, North Carolina, then Monticello in Charlottesville, Virginia, and thereafter High Point, Sanford, and Aberdeen, picking up baseball again while working at the last two.

== Baseball career ==
After resuming baseball in adulthood, Allen soon played for various local teams, including the Greensboro Patriots, who soon traded him, followed by the Fayetteville Highlanders, Greenville Tobacconists, Raleigh Capitals, and the Asheville Tourists. There are two accounts of how Allen was signed to the New York Yankees. One popularly shared story states that while working as a bellhop in a hotel, he was told to take some fans to the room of Yankee scout Paul Krichell. Allen told Krichell that he was a pitcher, and the scout arranged a tryout. Allen however said that this story was incorrect, and that Yankees scout Johnny Nee approached him after watching him play a game in Asheville in 1929. Allen was signed to the Yankees organization for $7,500, beating out the Cleveland Indians who were planning to make an offer for him soon.

After signing, Allen would not immediately play on the Yankees, but instead played for minor league teams around the country. In 1930, Allen played for the Jersey City Skeeters, where he gained a reputation for being charismatic but hotheaded. The season ended relatively poorly, and Allen was kept in the minor leagues after being rejected at the 1930 Yankees spring training. He would start another season at Jersey City, before being transferred to the Toronto Maple Leafs. After a successful season at Toronto, Allen was called up again by the Yankees for spring training, where he was then selected to play for the Yankees.

Allen was an immediate success for the Yankees, debuting in 1932 with a 17–4 record and a 3.70 earned run average (ERA) for the world champions. He was less stellar in that year's World Series, starting Game 4 and leaving after giving up three runs off five hits in just 2/3 of an inning.

Allen continued to post decent records for the Yankees, but a sore arm and his constant demands for more money threatened his career. For these reasons, Allen was dealt to the Indians before the 1936 season.

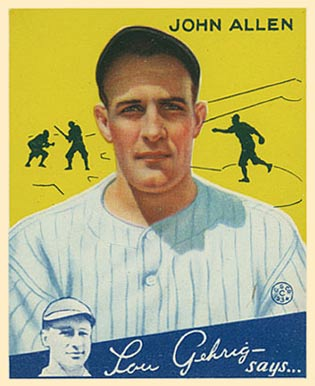
Allen in 1934

Allen turned things around in Cleveland, going 20–10 with a 3.44 ERA in 1936 and following that up by winning his first fifteen decisions of 1937, one short of the record held by Walter Johnson. Allen lost his next start 1–0 on an unearned run, but his 15–1 mark that year set a winning percentage record that lasted until Roy Face bettered it with an 18–1 record in 1959. In 1938, Allen won his first twelve decisions and made his only All-Star team. During the All-Star break, he suffered an unknown injury, some claim he slipped on a bar of soap in the shower, and never did approach his earlier success again, finally retiring in 1944 after six mediocre campaigns. Allen's finished his 13-year career with a 142–75 record and one of the best winning percentages (.654) in MLB history.

After retiring as a player, Allen became a minor league umpire, eventually becoming the umpire-in-chief of the Carolina League. He was posthumously inducted into the North Carolina Sports Hall of Fame, in 1977.

== Personal life ==
In October 1931, Allen married Leta Shields from Greensboro, and had two children, John, Jr, and Cathryn Lee. In retirement, he had worked as an automobile tag inspector, and later was involved in the real estate business. On March 29, 1959, Allen died in St. Petersburg, Florida. He was 54 years old. Allen's funeral and burial took place in Greensboro, but his son John Jr. eventually had his body exhumed so that he could be re-buried alongside Leta in St. Petersburg.

== Career summary ==
As a hitter, Allen posted a .173 career batting average (124-for-716), with 82 runs, four home runs, 64 runs batted in (RBI), and 33 bases on balls. Defensively, he recorded a .957 lifetime fielding percentage.

== Tributes from peers ==
Baseball Hall of Fame member Al Simmons named Allen the toughest pitcher for him to hit and Hall of Fame slugger Hank Greenberg named Allen among the five toughest pitchers he faced in his career.
