= 1941 Philadelphia Phillies season =

Baseball season

1941 Philadelphia Phillies
- League: National League
- Ballpark: Shibe Park
- City: Philadelphia
- Record: 43–111 (.279)
- League place: 8th
- Owners: Gerald Nugent
- Managers: Doc Prothro
- Radio: WIP

The 1941 Philadelphia Phillies season was a season in Major League Baseball. The Phillies finished eighth in the National League with a record of 43 wins and 111 losses.

On July 1, the Phillies played the Dodgers in Brooklyn; the game was televised by WNBT in New York (now WNBC), making the ballgame the first program aired by a commercial TV station in the United States. Although the Phillies finished last and the Dodgers later won the pennant, Philadelphia won the game 6–4, in 10 innings.

== Regular season ==
=== Season standings ===
National League
Team	W	L	Pct.	GB	Home	Road
Brooklyn Dodgers	100	54	.649	—	52‍–‍25	48‍–‍29
St. Louis Cardinals	97	56	.634	2½	53‍–‍24	44‍–‍32
Cincinnati Reds	88	66	.571	12	45‍–‍34	43‍–‍32
Pittsburgh Pirates	81	73	.526	19	45‍–‍32	36‍–‍41
New York Giants	74	79	.484	25½	38‍–‍39	36‍–‍40
Chicago Cubs	70	84	.455	30	38‍–‍39	32‍–‍45
Boston Braves	62	92	.403	38	32‍–‍44	30‍–‍48
Philadelphia Phillies	43	111	.279	57	23‍–‍52	20‍–‍59

=== Record vs. opponents ===
1941 National League record Sources:
Team	BSN	BRO	CHC	CIN	NYG	PHI	PIT	STL
Boston	—	4–18–2	11–11	9–13	6–16	14–8	10–12	8–14
Brooklyn	18–4–2	—	13–9	14–8	14–8	18–4	12–10	11–11–1
Chicago	11–11	9–13	—	8–14	9–13	14–8–1	9–13	10–12
Cincinnati	13–9	8–14	14–8	—	15–7	16–6	12–10	10–12
New York	16–6	8–14	13–9	7–15	—	16–6	8–14–2	6–15–1
Philadelphia	8–14	4–18	8–14–1	6–16	6–16	—	6–16	5–17
Pittsburgh	12–10	10–12	13–9	10–12	14–8–2	16–6	—	6–16
St. Louis	14–8	11–11–1	12–10	12–10	15–6–1	17–5	16–6	—

=== Game log ===
Legend
	Phillies win
	Phillies loss
	Phillies tie
	Postponement
**Bold**	Phillies team member

1941 Game Log
Overall Record: 43–111–1
April (5–10)

#	Date	Opponent	Score	Win	Loss	Save	Attendance	Record
1	April 15	Braves	6–5	**Cy Blanton** (1–0)	Dick Errickson (0–1)	None	10,595	1–0
2	April 16	Braves	1–4	Manny Salvo (1–0)	**Ike Pearson** (0–1)	None	3,516	1–1
3	April 17	Braves	5–7	Wes Ferrell (1–0)	**Boom-Boom Beck** (0–1)	None	not available	1–2
4	April 18	@ Giants	2–7	Bob Bowman (1–0)	**Vito Tamulis** (0–1)	None	13,980	1–3
5	April 19	@ Giants	0–7	Hal Schumacher (1–0)	**Tommy Hughes** (0–1)	None	14,192	1–4
6	April 20	@ Braves	5–7 (10)	Hank LaManna (1–0)	**Boom-Boom Beck** (0–2)	None	11,824	1–5
7	April 21	@ Braves	1–8	Wes Ferrell (2–0)	**Ike Pearson** (0–2)	None	1,687	1–6
8	April 22	@ Braves	6–4 (14)	**Tommy Hughes** (1–1)	Jim Tobin (0–2)	None	1,317	2–6
9	April 23	@ Dodgers	0–4	Whit Wyatt (2–1)	**Ike Pearson** (0–3)	None	4,146	2–7
10	April 24	@ Dodgers	1–6	Luke Hamlin (2–1)	**Roy Bruner** (0–1)	None	2,518	2–8
11	April 25	Giants	4–7	Hal Schumacher (2–0)	**Cy Blanton** (1–1)	Jumbo Brown (2)	1,000	2–9
12	April 26	Giants	7–6 (11)	**Johnny Podgajny** (1–0)	Cliff Melton (0–2)	None	2,265	3–9
13	April 27	Braves	3–8	Bill Posedel (1–0)	**Tommy Hughes** (1–2)	None	4,225	3–10
14	April 29	Pirates	6–2	**Bill Crouch** (1–0)	Max Butcher (1–2)	None	800	4–10
15	April 30	Pirates	8–4	**Cy Blanton** (2–1)	Dick Lanahan (0–1)	None	3,385	5–10

May (7–17)

#	Date	Opponent	Score	Win	Loss	Save	Attendance	Record
16	May 1	Pirates	2–15	Russ Bauers (1–2)	**Si Johnson** (0–1)	None	1,500	5–11
17	May 2	Cardinals	2–4	Howie Krist (1–0)	**Johnny Podgajny** (1–1)	None	1,000	5–12
18	May 3	Cardinals	0–6	Hank Gornicki (1–0)	**Bill Crouch** (1–1)	None	2,404	5–13
19	May 4	Reds	3–0	**Tommy Hughes** (2–2)	Gene Thompson (0–2)	None	6,471	6–13
–	May 5	Reds	Postponed (threatening weather and rain); Makeup: June 5					
20	May 6	Reds	4–2	**Cy Blanton** (3–1)	Johnny Vander Meer (2–3)	None	1,797	7–13
21	May 7	Cubs	2–11	Bill Lee (1–3)	**Bill Crouch** (1–2)	None	3,514	7–14
22	May 8	Cubs	1–5	Vern Olsen (1–1)	**Ike Pearson** (0–4)	None	1,223	7–15
–	May 9	Dodgers	Postponed (rain); Makeup: September 20 as a traditional double-header					
23	May 10	Dodgers	1–4	Whit Wyatt (6–1)	**Tommy Hughes** (2–3)	None	3,344	7–16
24	May 11	Dodgers	5–6	Kirby Higbe (3–2)	**Bill Crouch** (1–3)	None	10,305	7–17
25	May 13	@ Pirates	3–6	Rip Sewell (2–2)	**Lee Grissom** (0–1)	None	986	7–18
26	May 14	@ Pirates	7–12	Bob Klinger (1–1)	**Roy Bruner** (0–2)	None	1,254	7–19
27	May 15	@ Reds	5–4	**Bill Crouch** (2–3)	Gene Thompson (0–3)	**Ike Pearson** (1)	18,814	8–19
28	May 17	@ Reds	2–1	**Johnny Podgajny** (2–1)	Bucky Walters (4–3)	None	3,107	9–19
29	May 18	@ Cardinals	5–6	Howie Krist (2–0)	**Lee Grissom** (0–2)	None	9,833	9–20
30	May 20	@ Cardinals	6–4 (11)	**Ike Pearson** (1–4)	Ira Hutchinson (0–2)	None	1,084	10–20
31	May 21	@ Cubs	3–7	Jake Mooty (2–0)	**Lefty Hoerst** (0–1)	None	3,411	10–21
–	May 22	@ Cubs	Postponed (rain); Makeup: June 15 as a traditional double-header					
32	May 24	@ Dodgers	3–7	Kirby Higbe (4–3)	**Tommy Hughes** (2–4)	Bill Swift (1)	8,576	10–22
33	May 25	@ Dodgers	4–8	Bill Swift (2–0)	**Ike Pearson** (1–5)	Curt Davis (1)	12,941	10–23
34	May 26	@ Dodgers	4–6	Freddie Fitzsimmons (1–0)	**Lefty Hoerst** (0–2)	Kirby Higbe (1)	5,682	10–24
35	May 27	Dodgers	0–6	Hugh Casey (6–2)	**Johnny Podgajny** (2–2)	None	1,200	10–25
36	May 28	Dodgers	5–6 (12)	Bill Swift (3–0)	**Roy Bruner** (0–3)	None	10,666	10–26
37	May 30 (1)	Braves	6–5	**Cy Blanton** (4–1)	Jim Tobin (2–4)	**Bill Crouch** (1)	see 2nd game	11–26
38	May 30 (2)	Braves	1–4	Art Johnson (2–1)	**Lefty Hoerst** (0–3)	None	12,937	11–27
39	May 31	Braves	1–0	**Si Johnson** (1–1)	Manny Salvo (1–6)	None	1,500	12–27

June (7–22)

#	Date	Opponent	Score	Win	Loss	Save	Attendance	Record
40	June 1 (1)	Cubs	5–9	Charlie Root (3–2)	**Ike Pearson** (1–6)	Vance Page (1)	see 2nd game	12–28
41	June 1 (2)	Cubs	0–1	Jake Mooty (3–1)	**Lee Grissom** (0–3)	None	4,365	12–29
42	June 2	Cubs	3–2	**Johnny Podgajny** (3–2)	Larry French (2–6)	None	1,000	13–29
43	June 3	Cubs	7–0	**Tommy Hughes** (3–4)	Bill Lee (5–5)	None	1,000	14–29
–	June 4	Reds	Postponed (rain and wet grounds); Makeup: July 19 as a traditional double-header					
–	June 5	Reds	Postponed (rain); Makeup: August 18 as a traditional double-header					
44	June 6	Reds	0–7	Johnny Vander Meer (5–4)	**Si Johnson** (1–2)	None	7,044	14–30
45	June 7	Pirates	2–0	**Cy Blanton** (5–1)	Johnny Lanning (1–3)	None	3,802	15–30
46	June 8 (1)	Pirates	2–12	Joe Bowman (2–1)	**Tommy Hughes** (3–5)	Rip Sewell (1)	see 2nd game	15–31
47	June 8 (2)	Pirates	5–2	**Johnny Podgajny** (4–2)	Russ Bauers (1–3)	None	11,604	16–31
48	June 9	Pirates	0–5	Lefty Wilkie (2–1)	**Lee Grissom** (0–4)	None	892	16–32
49	June 10	Cardinals	0–3	Lon Warneke (7–1)	**Si Johnson** (1–3)	None	3,792	16–33
50	June 11	Cardinals	2–3 (10)	Howie Krist (5–0)	**Boom-Boom Beck** (0–3)	None	6,710	16–34
51	June 14	@ Cubs	0–3	Vern Olsen (3–2)	**Cy Blanton** (5–2)	None	2,838	16–35
52	June 15 (1)	@ Cubs	0–6	Claude Passeau (6–5)	**Tommy Hughes** (3–6)	None	see 2nd game	16–36
53	June 15 (2)	@ Cubs	8–4	**Johnny Podgajny** (5–2)	Charlie Root (4–3)	None	7,001	17–36
54	June 16	@ Cubs	1–3	Jake Mooty (4–2)	**Lee Grissom** (0–5)	Tot Pressnell (1)	3,181	17–37
55	June 17	@ Cardinals	3–11	Mort Cooper (7–3)	**Boom-Boom Beck** (0–4)	None	1,623	17–38
56	June 18	@ Cardinals	3–7	Max Lanier (5–2)	**Cy Blanton** (5–3)	None	1,402	17–39
57	June 19	@ Cardinals	6–7 (11)	Sam Nahem (5–0)	**Tommy Hughes** (3–7)	None	1,473	17–40
58	June 20	@ Pirates	6–7	Dutch Dietz (1–0)	**Ike Pearson** (1–7)	None	1,046	17–41
59	June 21	@ Pirates	0–2	Joe Bowman (3–1)	**Lee Grissom** (0–6)	None	2,321	17–42
60	June 22 (1)^{^{[a]}}	@ Pirates	1–4	Rip Sewell (6–6)	**Cy Blanton** (5–4)	None	see 2nd game	17–43
61	June 22 (2)^{^{[a]}}	@ Pirates	7–4	**Tommy Hughes** (4–7)	Max Butcher (6–5)	**Si Johnson** (1)	10,060	18–43
62	June 24	@ Reds	1–5	Bucky Walters (8–6)	**Boom-Boom Beck** (0–5)	None	2,184	18–44
63	June 25 (1)	@ Reds	3–8	Elmer Riddle (7–0)	**Johnny Podgajny** (5–3)	None	see 2nd game	18–45
64	June 25 (2)	@ Reds	1–5	Monte Pearson (1–2)	**Lee Grissom** (0–7)	None	5,071	18–46
65	June 27	@ Giants	4–7	Bill Lohrman (4–5)	**Si Johnson** (1–4)	None	26,626	18–47
66	June 28	@ Giants	3–2 (12)	**Tommy Hughes** (5–7)	Jumbo Brown (1–2)	None	4,682	19–47
67	June 29	@ Giants	7–10	Ace Adams (3–0)	**Lee Grissom** (0–8)	None	11,783	19–48
68	June 30	@ Dodgers	2–9	Whit Wyatt (12–4)	**Johnny Podgajny** (5–4)	None	4,472	19–49

July (6–20–1)

#	Date	Opponent	Score	Win	Loss	Save	Attendance	Record
69	July 1	@ Dodgers	6–4 (10)	**Ike Pearson** (2–7)	Hugh Casey (9–5)	None	3,339	20–49
70	July 2	@ Dodgers	3–9	Newt Kimball (1–0)	**Lefty Hoerst** (0–4)	None	2,799	20–50
71	July 3	@ Braves	1–4	Al Javery (5–1)	**Tommy Hughes** (5–8)	None	1,003	20–51
72	July 4 (1)	@ Braves	3–4	Manny Salvo (2–10)	**Si Johnson** (1–5)	None	see 2nd game	20–52
73	July 4 (2)	@ Braves	0–2	Jim Tobin (4–4)	**Johnny Podgajny** (5–5)	None	6,013	20–53
–	July 5	Giants	Postponed (wet grounds); Makeup: August 17 as a traditional double-header					
74	July 6 (1)	Giants	3–7 (8)	Carl Hubbell (7–3)	**Cy Blanton** (5–5)	None	3,165	20–54
–	July 6 (2)	Giants	Postponed (wet grounds); Makeup: September 23 as a traditional double-header					
–	July 8	**1941 Major League Baseball All-Star Game at Briggs Stadium in Detroit**						
75	July 10	Pirates	3–6	Rip Sewell (9–7)	**Tommy Hughes** (5–9)	Joe Sullivan (1)	4,630	20–55
76	July 12	Pirates	1–6	Johnny Lanning (3–5)	**Johnny Podgajny** (5–6)	None	1,500	20–56
77	July 13 (1)	Cardinals	2–7	Lon Warneke (10–5)	**Lefty Hoerst** (0–5)	None	see 2nd game	20–57
78	July 13 (2)	Cardinals	5–8	Ira Hutchinson (1–4)	**Cy Blanton** (5–6)	Bill Crouch (3)	6,385	20–58
79	July 14	Cardinals	5–4	**Si Johnson** (2–5)	Sam Nahem (5–2)	None	1,538	21–58
80	July 15	Cardinals	2–3 (16)	Howie Krist (7–0)	**Ike Pearson** (2–8)	None	1,000	21–59
81	July 16	Cubs	5–9	Charlie Root (5–5)	**Rube Melton** (0–1)	Vern Olsen (1)	5,833	21–60
82	July 17	Cubs	2–2 (6)^{^{[b]}}	None	None	None	1,500	21–60–1
–	July 19 (1)	Reds	Postponed (rain); Makeup: August 19 as a traditional double-header					
–	July 19 (2)	Reds	Postponed (rain); Makeup: August 20 as a traditional double-header					
83	July 20 (1)	Reds	1–7	Paul Derringer (8–12)	**Ike Pearson** (2–9)	None	see 2nd game	21–61–1
84	July 20 (2)	Reds	2–3	Jim Turner (3–2)	**Lee Grissom** (0–9)	Joe Beggs (3)	7,582	21–62–1
85	July 22	@ Pirates	3–4	Bob Klinger (3–3)	**Johnny Podgajny** (5–7)	None	1,730	21–63–1
86	July 23	@ Pirates	2–5	Max Butcher (10–7)	**Cy Blanton** (5–7)	None	13,109	21–64–1
87	July 24	@ Pirates	2–3	Bob Klinger (4–3)	**Lee Grissom** (0–10)	None	1,326	21–65–1
88	July 25	@ Reds	4–3	**Tommy Hughes** (6–9)	Johnny Vander Meer (8–10)	None	2,044	22–65–1
89	July 26	@ Reds	2–6	Jim Turner (4–2)	**Si Johnson** (2–6)	None	3,181	22–66–1
90	July 27 (1)	@ Reds	0–2	Paul Derringer (9–12)	**Boom-Boom Beck** (0–6)	None	see 2nd game	22–67–1
91	July 27 (2)	@ Reds	8–1	**Johnny Podgajny** (6–7)	Bucky Walters (12–8)	None	13,463	23–67–1
92	July 29	@ Cubs	4–12	Larry French (5–11)	**Ike Pearson** (2–10)	None	2,440	23–68–1
93	July 30 (1)^{^{[c]}}	@ Cubs	8–4	**Cy Blanton** (6–7)	Jake Mooty (3–4)	None	see 2nd game	24–68–1
94	July 30 (2)^{^{[c]}}	@ Cubs	3–5	Tot Pressnell (2–2)	**Ike Pearson** (2–11)	None	7,499	24–69–1
95	July 31	@ Cubs	7–2	**Johnny Podgajny** (7–7)	Charlie Root (5–6)	None	2,203	25–29–1

August (11–20)

#	Date	Opponent	Score	Win	Loss	Save	Attendance	Record
96	August 1	@ Cardinals	2–1 (11)	**Si Johnson** (3–6)	Lon Warneke (12–6)	None	20,342	26–69–1
97	August 2	@ Cardinals	7–11	Howie Krist (9–0)	**Lee Grissom** (0–11)	None	2,251	26–70–1
98	August 3 (1)	@ Cardinals	1–6	Mort Cooper (8–3)	**Cy Blanton** (6–8)	None	see 2nd game	26–71–1
99	August 3 (2)	@ Cardinals	1–6	Lon Warneke (13–6)	**Ike Pearson** (2–12)	None	11,280	26–72–1
100	August 5	Braves	9–10	Hank LaManna (5–3)	**Tommy Hughes** (6–10)	Tom Earley (3)	1,000	26–73–1
101	August 6	Braves	0–6	Manny Salvo (3–11)	**Si Johnson** (3–7)	None	3,223	26–74–1
102	August 8	@ Giants	2–3 (11)	Bill Lohrman (7–7)	**Cy Blanton** (6–9)	None	2,388	26–75–1
103	August 9	@ Giants	0–1	Hal Schumacher (7–8)	**Johnny Podgajny** (7–8)	None	2,922	26–76–1
104	August 10 (1)^{^{[d]}}	@ Giants	4–5	Ace Adams (4–1)	**Tommy Hughes** (6–11)	Cliff Melton (1)	see 2nd game	26–77–1
105	August 10 (2)^{^{[d]}}	@ Giants	4–3	**Si Johnson** (4–7)	Johnny Wittig (2–5)	None	9,877	27–77–1
106	August 11	@ Braves	6–3	**Boom-Boom Beck** (1–6)	Hank LaManna (5–4)	None	1,043	28–77–1
107	August 12	@ Braves	2–1 (13)	**Ike Pearson** (3–12)	Jim Tobin (9–7)	None	1,173	29–77–1
108	August 13	@ Dodgers	2–7	Curt Davis (8–6)	**Johnny Podgajny** (7–9)	None	16,991	29–78–1
–	August 15	Giants	Postponed (rain); Makeup: September 24 as a traditional double-header					
109	August 16	Giants	1–4	Johnny Wittig (3–5)	**Tommy Hughes** (6–12)	Jumbo Brown (8)	7,000	29–79–1
110	August 17 (1)	Giants	6–2	**Si Johnson** (5–7)	Bob Carpenter (7–5)	None	see 2nd game	30–79–1
111	August 17 (2)	Giants	18–2	**Lee Grissom** (1–11)	Bill Lohrman (8–8)	None	6,587	31–79–1
112	August 18 (1)	Reds	5–13	Joe Beggs (3–1)	**Boom-Boom Beck** (1–7)	None	see 2nd game	31–80–1
113	August 18 (2)	Reds	4–5	Gene Thompson (3–4)	**Johnny Podgajny** (7–10)	None	2,873	31–81–1
–	August 19 (1)	Reds	Postponed (rain and wet grounds); Makeup: September 17 as a traditional double-header in Cincinnati					
–	August 19 (2)	Reds	Postponed (rain and wet grounds); Makeup: September 18 as a traditional double-header in Cincinnati					
114	August 20 (1)	Reds	0–2	Johnny Vander Meer (13–10)	**Lefty Hoerst** (0–6)	None	see 2nd game	31–82–1
115	August 20 (2)	Reds	0–3	Elmer Riddle (14–2)	**Rube Melton** (0–2)	None	8,605	31–83–1
116	August 21	Cardinals	5–4	**Ike Pearson** (4–12)	Mort Cooper (11–5)	None	7,209	32–83–1
117	August 22	Cardinals	2–4 (10)	Lon Warneke (14–7)	**Cy Blanton** (6–10)	None	1,000	32–84–1
118	August 23	Cardinals	4–2	**Lee Grissom** (2–11)	Bill Crouch (2–5)	**Si Johnson** (2)	2,607	33–84–1
119	August 24 (1)^{^{[e]}}	Cubs	8–5	**Johnny Podgajny** (8–10)	Vallie Eaves (2–2)	**Ike Pearson** (2)	see 2nd game	34–84–1
120	August 24 (2)^{^{[e]}}	Cubs	7–6	**Lefty Hoerst** (1–6)	Claude Passeau (12–11)	None	8,145	35–84–1
121	August 26 (1)^{^{[e]}}	Cubs	4–5	Jake Mooty (7–5)	**Lefty Hoerst** (1–7)	None	see 2nd game	35–85–1
122	August 26 (2)^{^{[e]}}	Cubs	3–11	Paul Erickson (2–5)	**Si Johnson** (5–8)	None	3,500	35–86–1
123	August 27	Pirates	2–12	Johnny Lanning (9–8)	**Cy Blanton** (6–11)	None	1,748	35–87–1
124	August 28	Pirates	2–3	Dutch Dietz (5–1)	**Ike Pearson** (4–13)	Bob Klinger (4)	5,500	35–88–1
125	August 31 (1)^{^{[f]}}	Braves	3–8	Jim Tobin (12–8)	**Lee Grissom** (2–12)	None	see 2nd game	35–89–1
126	August 31 (2)^{^{[f]}}	Braves	8–5	**Johnny Podgajny** (9–10)	Manny Salvo (5–13)	**Ike Pearson** (3)	5,661	36–89–1

September (7–22)

#	Date	Opponent	Score	Win	Loss	Save	Attendance	Record
127	September 1 (1)	@ Giants	2–7	Bob Carpenter (8–6)	**Tommy Hughes** (6–13)	None	see 2nd game	36–90–1
128	September 1 (2)	@ Giants	3–4 (10)	Bob Bowman (6–6)	**Boom-Boom Beck** (1–8)	None	8,248	36–91–1
129	September 3 (1)	Dodgers	1–4	Whit Wyatt (19–9)	**Lee Grissom** (2–13)	None	see 2nd game	36–92–1
130	September 3 (2)	Dodgers	4–1	**Lefty Hoerst** (2–7)	Ed Albosta (0–1)	None	7,260	37–92–1
–	September 4	Dodgers	Postponed (rain); Makeup: September 21 as a traditional double-header					
131	September 6	@ Braves	4–3	**Rube Melton** (1–2)	Jim Tobin (12–9)	**Ike Pearson** (4)	1,868	38–92–1
132	September 7 (1)^{^{[g]}}	@ Braves	6–17	Manny Salvo (6–14)	**Cy Blanton** (6–12)	None	see 2nd game	38–93–1
133	September 7 (2)^{^{[g]}}	@ Braves	1–10	Tom Earley (5–5)	**Lefty Hoerst** (2–8)	None	7,161	38–94–1
–	September 9	@ Cardinals	Postponed (rain); Makeup: September 10 as a traditional double-header					
134	September 10 (1)	@ Cardinals	2–3	Lon Warneke (16–8)	**Ike Pearson** (4–14)	Bill Crouch (7)	see 2nd game	38–95–1
135	September 10 (2)	@ Cardinals	0–1	Harry Gumbert (10–6)	**Si Johnson** (5–9)	None	3,250	38–96–1
136	September 12	@ Cubs	5–3	**Tommy Hughes** (7–13)	Jake Mooty (7–8)	None	2,023	39–96–1
137	September 13	@ Cubs	4–5 (11)	Claude Passeau (14–13)	**Johnny Podgajny** (9–11)	None	3,771	39–97–1
138	September 14 (1)^{^{[a]}}	@ Pirates	1–2	Max Butcher (16–11)	**Lefty Hoerst** (2–9)	None	see 2nd game	39–98–1
139	September 14 (2)^{^{[a]}}	@ Pirates	6–3	**Tommy Hughes** (8–13)	Rip Sewell (13–16)	None	7,495	40–98–1
140	September 17 (1)	@ Reds	0–1	Johnny Vander Meer (15–12)	**Rube Melton** (1–3)	None	see 2nd game	40–99–1
141	September 17 (2)	@ Reds	2–3	Gene Thompson (6–6)	**Boom-Boom Beck** (1–9)	None	2,199	40–100–1
142	September 18 (1)	@ Reds	0–5	Ray Starr (2–2)	**Tommy Hughes** (8–14)	None	see 2nd game	40–101–1
143	September 18 (2)	@ Reds	2–9	Jim Turner (6–4)	**Si Johnson** (5–10)	None	2,465	40–102–1
144	September 20 (1)	Dodgers	2–3	Whit Wyatt (21–10)	**Lefty Hoerst** (2–10)	Hugh Casey (6)	see 2nd game	40–103–1
145	September 20 (2)	Dodgers	1–6	Kirby Higbe (21–9)	**Cy Blanton** (6–13)	None	17,794	40–104–1
146	September 21 (1)	Dodgers	3–8	Johnny Allen (5–5)	**Johnny Podgajny** (9–12)	None	see 2nd game	40–105–1
147	September 21 (2)	Dodgers	6–3	**Tommy Hughes** (9–14)	Luke Hamlin (8–8)	**Ike Pearson** (5)	35,909	41–105–1
148	September 22	Dodgers	0–5	Curt Davis (13–7)	**Rube Melton** (1–4)	None	8,434	41–106–1
149	September 23 (1)	Giants	8–2	**Paul Masterson** (1–0)	Cliff Melton (8–11)	None	see 2nd game	42–106–1
150	September 23 (2)	Giants	6–8	Hugh East (1–1)	**Dale Jones** (0–1)	Ace Adams (1)	1,000	42–107–1
151	September 24 (1)	Giants	1–4	Hal Schumacher (12–10)	**Si Johnson** (5–11)	None	see 2nd game	42–108–1
152	September 24 (2)	Giants	0–2	Tom Sunkel (1–1)	**Gene Lambert** (0–1)	None	2,000	42–109–1
153	September 25	Giants	2–3	Bob Carpenter (11–6)	**Si Johnson** (5–12)	None	500	42–110–1
154	September 27	@ Dodgers	7–3	**Lefty Hoerst** (3–10)	Ed Albosta (0–2)	**Ike Pearson** (6)	11,806	43–110–1
155	September 28	@ Dodgers	1–5	Bob Chipman (1–0)	**Rube Melton** (1–5)	None	12,870	43–111–1

^{^[a]}The original schedule indicated single games on June 22 and September 14, 15, and 16 at Pittsburgh; which became double-headers on June 22 and September 14.
^{^[b]}The July 17, 1941, game ended after six innings due to rain with the score tied 2–2, and an additional game was scheduled for August 25.
^{^[c]}The original schedule indicated single games on July 30 and September 11 at Chicago; which became a double-header on July 30.
^{^[d]}The original schedule indicated single games on August 10 and September 2 at New York; which became a double-header on August 10.
^{^[e]}The original schedule indicated single games on August 24, 25, and 26 with Chicago. An additional game was scheduled for August 25 because of the tie game on July 17. The end result was double-headers played on August 24 and 26.
^{^[f]}The original schedule indicated single games on August 30 and 31 with Boston; which became a double-header on August 31.
^{^[g]}The original schedule indicated single games on September 5 and 7 at Boston; which became a double-header on September 7.

=== Roster ===
1941 Philadelphia Phillies
**Roster**
**Pitchers**: 15 Boom-Boom Beck; 14 Cy Blanton; 33 Roy Bruner; 6 Bill Crouch; 10 Lee Grissom; 30 Bill Harman; 11 Lefty Hoerst; 28 Tommy Hughes; 34 Si Johnson; 33 Dale Jones; 9 Gene Lambert; 23 Paul Masterson; 8 Rube Melton; 12 Ike Pearson; 17 Johnny Podgajny; 10 Vito Tamulis	**Catchers**: 3 Mickey Livingston; 23 Wally Millies; 26 Bennie Warren; **Infielders**: 20 Bobby Bragan; 25 Nick Etten; 16 George Jumonville; 24 Hal Marnie; 19 Pinky May; 31,21 Heinie Mueller; 16 Danny Murtaugh; 9 Bill Nagel	**Outfielders**: 7 Stan Benjamin; 6 Paul Busby; 23 Jim Carlin; 29 Chuck Klein; 4 Danny Litwhiler; 35 Joe Marty; 5 Johnny Rizzo	**Manager**: 1 Doc Prothro; **Coaches**: 3 Syl Johnson; 2 Hans Lobert

== Player stats ==
=== Batting ===
==== Starters by position ====
Note: Pos = Position; G = Games played; AB = At bats; H = Hits; Avg. = Batting average; HR = Home runs; RBI = Runs batted in; SB = Stolen bases

Pos	Player	G	AB	H	Avg.	HR	RBI	SB
C	Bennie Warren	121	345	74	.214	9	35	0
1B	Nick Etten	151	540	168	.311	14	79	9
2B	Danny Murtaugh	85	347	76	.219	0	11	18
SS	Bobby Bragan	154	557	140	.251	4	69	7
3B	Pinky May	142	490	131	.267	0	39	2
OF	Joe Marty	137	477	128	.268	8	39	6
OF	Stan Benjamin	129	480	113	.235	3	27	17
OF	Danny Litwhiler	151	590	180	.305	18	66	1

==== Other batters ====
Note: G = Games played; AB = At bats; H = Hits; Avg. = Batting average; HR = Home runs; RBI = Runs batted in

Player	G	AB	H	Avg.	HR	RBI
Johnny Rizzo	99	235	51	.217	4	24
Heinie Mueller	93	233	53	.227	1	22
Mickey Livingston	95	207	42	.203	0	18
Hal Marnie	61	158	38	.241	0	11
Chuck Klein	50	73	9	.123	1	3
Bill Nagel	17	56	8	.143	0	6
Jim Carlin	16	21	3	.143	1	2
Paul Busby	10	16	5	.313	0	2
George Jumonville	6	7	3	.429	1	2
Wally Millies	1	2	0	.000	0	0

=== Pitching ===
==== Starting pitchers ====
Note: G = Games pitched; IP = Innings pitched; W = Wins; L = Losses; ERA = Earned run average; SO = Strikeouts

Player	G	IP	W	L	ERA	SO
Johnny Podgajny	34	181.1	9	12	4.62	53
Tommy Hughes	34	170.0	9	14	4.45	59
Cy Blanton	28	163.2	6	13	4.51	64

==== Other pitchers ====
Note: G = Games pitched; IP = Innings pitched; W = Wins; L = Losses; ERA = Earned run average; SO = Strikeouts

Player	G	IP	W	L	ERA	SO
Si Johnson	39	163.1	5	12	4.52	80
Ike Pearson	46	136.0	4	14	3.57	38
Lee Grissom	29	131.1	2	13	3.97	74
Lefty Hoerst	37	105.2	3	10	5.20	33
Boom-Boom Beck	34	95.1	1	9	4.63	34
Rube Melton	25	83.2	1	5	4.73	57
Bill Crouch	20	59.0	2	3	4.42	26
Vito Tamulis	6	12.0	0	1	9.00	5
Paul Masterson	2	11.1	1	0	4.76	8
Gene Lambert	2	9.0	0	1	2.00	3
Dale Jones	2	8.1	0	1	7.56	2

==== Relief pitchers ====
Note: G = Games pitched; W = Wins; L = Losses; SV = Saves; ERA = Earned run average; SO = Strikeouts

Player	G	W	L	SV	ERA	SO
Roy Bruner	13	0	3	0	4.91	13
Bill Harman	5	0	0	0	4.85	3

== Farm system ==
Level	Team	League	Manager
B	Allentown Wings	Interstate League	Cy Morgan and Jimmie DeShong
C	Wausau Timberjacks	Northern League	Wally Gilbert
D	Martinsville Manufacturers	Bi-State League	George Ferrell
