= 1941 St. Louis Cardinals season =

Major League Baseball season

1941 St. Louis Cardinals
- League: National League
- Ballpark: Sportsman's Park
- City: St. Louis, Missouri
- Record: 97–56 (.634)
- League place: 2nd
- Owners: Sam Breadon
- General managers: Branch Rickey
- Managers: Billy Southworth
- Radio: KWK (Johnny O'Hara, Johnny Neblett, Dizzy Dean); KXOK (France Laux)
- Stats: ESPN.com; Baseball Reference

The 1941 St. Louis Cardinals season was the team's 60th season in St. Louis, Missouri and the 50th season in the National League. The Cardinals went 97–56 during the season and finished second in the National League.

== Offseason ==
- Prior to 1941 season (exact date unknown)
  - Hal Rice was signed as an amateur free agent by the Cardinals.
  - Tommy Glaviano was signed as an amateur free agent by the Cardinals.
  - Chuck Diering was signed as an amateur free agent by the Cardinals.

== Regular season ==
=== Season standings ===
National League
Team	W	L	Pct.	GB	Home	Road
Brooklyn Dodgers	100	54	.649	—	52‍–‍25	48‍–‍29
St. Louis Cardinals	97	56	.634	2½	53‍–‍24	44‍–‍32
Cincinnati Reds	88	66	.571	12	45‍–‍34	43‍–‍32
Pittsburgh Pirates	81	73	.526	19	45‍–‍32	36‍–‍41
New York Giants	74	79	.484	25½	38‍–‍39	36‍–‍40
Chicago Cubs	70	84	.455	30	38‍–‍39	32‍–‍45
Boston Braves	62	92	.403	38	32‍–‍44	30‍–‍48
Philadelphia Phillies	43	111	.279	57	23‍–‍52	20‍–‍59

=== Record vs. opponents ===
1941 National League record Sources:
Team	BSN	BRO	CHC	CIN	NYG	PHI	PIT	STL
Boston	—	4–18–2	11–11	9–13	6–16	14–8	10–12	8–14
Brooklyn	18–4–2	—	13–9	14–8	14–8	18–4	12–10	11–11–1
Chicago	11–11	9–13	—	8–14	9–13	14–8–1	9–13	10–12
Cincinnati	13–9	8–14	14–8	—	15–7	16–6	12–10	10–12
New York	16–6	8–14	13–9	7–15	—	16–6	8–14–2	6–15–1
Philadelphia	8–14	4–18	8–14–1	6–16	6–16	—	6–16	5–17
Pittsburgh	12–10	10–12	13–9	10–12	14–8–2	16–6	—	6–16
St. Louis	14–8	11–11–1	12–10	12–10	15–6–1	17–5	16–6	—

=== Notable transactions ===
- June 21, 1941: Jimmy Ripple was purchased by the Cardinals from the Cincinnati Reds.
- September 2, 1941: Hank Gornicki was purchased from the Cardinals by the Chicago Cubs.
- September 22, 1941: The purchase of Hank Gornicki's contract from the Cardinals by the Cubs was voided, and Gornicki was returned to the Cardinals.

=== Roster ===
1941 St. Louis Cardinals
Roster
Pitchers: 21 Johnny Beazley; 13 Mort Cooper; 34 Bill Crouch; 33 Hank Gornicki; 34 Johnny Grodzicki; 42 Harry Gumbert; 30 Ira Hutchinson; 26 Howie Krist; 23 Max Lanier; 42 Hersh Lyons; 29 Bill McGee; 37 Sam Nahem; 37 Howie Pollet; 24 Clyde Shoun; 18 Lon Warneke; 28 Ernie White	Catchers: 17 Walker Cooper; 14 Gus Mancuso; 33 Chip Marshall; Infielders: 3 Jimmy Brown; 7 Creepy Crespi; 1 Whitey Kurowski; 1 Eddie Lake; 4 Marty Marion; 5 Steve Mesner; 10 Johnny Mize	Outfielders: 11 Estel Crabtree; 19 Erv Dusak; 12 Johnny Hopp; 19 Ernie Koy; 8 Terry Moore; 6 Stan Musial; 16 Don Padgett; 38 Walter Sessi; 9 Enos Slaughter; 20 Coaker Triplett; 6 Harry Walker; Other batters: 6 Pep Young	Manager: 40 Billy Southworth; Coaches: 35 Mike González; 36 Buzzy Wares

== Player stats ==
= Indicates team leader

=== Batting ===
==== Starters by position ====
Note: Pos = Position; G = Games played; AB = At bats; H = Hits; Avg. = Batting average; HR = Home runs; RBI = Runs batted in

Pos	Player	G	AB	H	Avg.	HR	RBI
C	Gus Mancuso	106	328	75	.229	2	37
1B	Johnny Mize	126	473	150	.317	16	100
2B	Creepy Crespi	146	560	156	.279	4	46
SS	Marty Marion	155	547	138	.252	3	58
3B	Jimmy Brown	132	549	168	.306	3	56
OF	Enos Slaughter	113	425	132	.311	13	76
OF	Johnny Hopp	134	445	135	.303	4	50
OF	Terry Moore	122	493	145	.294	6	68

==== Other batters ====
Note: G = Games played; AB = At bats; H = Hits; Avg. = Batting average; HR = Home runs; RBI = Runs batted in

Player	G	AB	H	Avg.	HR	RBI
Don Padgett	107	324	80	.247	5	44
Walker Cooper	68	200	49	.245	1	20
Coaker Triplett	76	185	53	.286	3	21
Estel Crabtree	77	167	57	.341	5	28
Eddie Lake	45	76	8	.105	0	0
Steve Mesner	24	69	10	.145	0	10
Stan Musial	12	47	20	.426	1	7
Ernie Koy	13	40	8	.200	2	4
Harry Walker	7	15	4	.267	0	1
Erv Dusak	6	14	2	.143	0	3
Walter Sessi	5	13	0	.000	0	0
Whitey Kurowski	5	9	3	.333	0	2
Pep Young	2	2	0	.000	0	0
Chip Marshall	1	0	0	----	0	0

=== Pitching ===
==== Starting pitchers ====
Note: G = Games pitched; IP = Innings pitched; W = Wins; L = Losses; ERA = Earned run average; SO = Strikeouts

Player	G	IP	W	L	ERA	SO
Lon Warneke	37	246.0	17	9	3.15	83
Ernie White	32	210.0	17	7	2.40	117
Mort Cooper	29	186.2	13	9	3.91	118
Max Lanier	35	153.0	10	8	2.82	93
Harry Gumbert	33	144.0	11	5	2.74	53
Howie Pollet	9	70.0	5	2	1.93	37
Johnny Beazley	1	9.0	1	0	1.00	4

==== Other pitchers ====
Note: G = Games pitched; IP = Innings pitched; W = Wins; L = Losses; ERA = Earned run average; SO = Strikeouts

Player	G	IP	W	L	ERA	SO
Howie Krist	37	114.0	10	0	4.03	36
Sam Nahem	26	81.2	5	2	2.98	31
Clyde Shoun	26	70.0	3	5	5.66	34
Bill Crouch	18	45.0	1	2	3.00	15
Bill McGee	4	14.0	0	1	5.14	2
Johnny Grodzicki	5	13.1	2	1	1.35	10
Hank Gornicki	4	11.1	1	0	3.18	6

==== Relief pitchers ====
Note: G = Games pitched; W = Wins; L = Losses; SV = Saves; ERA = Earned run average; SO = Strikeouts

Player	G	W	L	SV	ERA	SO
Ira Hutchinson	29	1	5	5	3.86	19
Hersh Lyons	1	0	0	0	0.00	1

== Farm system ==
Level	Team	League	Manager
AA	Columbus Red Birds	American Association	Burt Shotton
AA	Rochester Red Wings	International League	Tony Kaufmann
AA	Sacramento Solons	Pacific Coast League	Pepper Martin
A1	New Orleans Pelicans	Southern Association	Ray Blades
A1	Houston Buffaloes	Texas League	Eddie Dyer
B	Decatur Commodores	Illinois–Indiana–Iowa League	Dib Williams
B	Asheville Tourists	Piedmont League	Nick Cullop
B	Columbus Red Birds	Sally League	Clay Hopper
B	Mobile Shippers	Southeastern League	Tommy West
C	Fresno Cardinals	California League	George Silvey
C	Springfield Cardinals	Middle Atlantic League	Walter Alston
C	Duluth Dukes	Northern League	Joe Davis
C	Pocatello Cardinals	Pioneer League	Bill DeLancey
C	Springfield Cardinals	Western Association	Ollie Vanek
D	Johnson City Cardinals	Appalachian League	John Morrow and Harold Michel
D	Cambridge Canners	Eastern Shore League	Everett Johnston
D	New Iberia Cardinals	Evangeline League	Johnny Keane
D	Daytona Beach Islanders	Florida State League	Bunny Simmons

Level	Team	League	Manager
D	Albany Cardinals	Georgia–Florida League	Joe Cusick
D	Union City Greyhounds	KITTY League	Charles Martin and Fred Hawn
D	Williamson Red Birds	Mountain State League	Harrison Wickel
D	Cooleemee Cards	North Carolina State League	Fred Hawn and Charles Martin
D	Batesville Pilots	Northeast Arkansas League	Ernie Stefani and Jim Winford
D	Washington Red Birds	Pennsylvania State Association	Herb Moore
D	Hamilton Red Wings	PONY League	Roy Pfleger
D	Sioux City Cowboys	Western League	Dick Tichasek

LEAGUE CHAMPIONS: Columbus (American Assn.), Mobile, New Iberia
