= 1941 Chicago Cubs season =

1941 Chicago Cubs
- League: National League
- Ballpark: Wrigley Field
- City: Chicago
- Record: 70–84 (.455)
- League place: 6th
- Owners: Philip K. Wrigley
- General managers: James T. Gallagher
- Managers: Jimmie Wilson
- Radio: WGN (Bob Elson, Jack Brickhouse); WJJD (Alan Hale, Pat Flanagan); WCFL (Hal Totten, Jimmy Dudley)

The 1941 Chicago Cubs season was the 70th season of the Chicago Cubs franchise, the 66th in the National League and the 26th at Wrigley Field. The Cubs finished sixth in the National League with a record of 70–84.

== Regular season ==
=== Season standings ===
National League
Team	W	L	Pct.	GB	Home	Road
Brooklyn Dodgers	100	54	.649	—	52‍–‍25	48‍–‍29
St. Louis Cardinals	97	56	.634	2½	53‍–‍24	44‍–‍32
Cincinnati Reds	88	66	.571	12	45‍–‍34	43‍–‍32
Pittsburgh Pirates	81	73	.526	19	45‍–‍32	36‍–‍41
New York Giants	74	79	.484	25½	38‍–‍39	36‍–‍40
Chicago Cubs	70	84	.455	30	38‍–‍39	32‍–‍45
Boston Braves	62	92	.403	38	32‍–‍44	30‍–‍48
Philadelphia Phillies	43	111	.279	57	23‍–‍52	20‍–‍59

=== Record vs. opponents ===
1941 National League record Sources:
Team	BSN	BRO	CHC	CIN	NYG	PHI	PIT	STL
Boston	—	4–18–2	11–11	9–13	6–16	14–8	10–12	8–14
Brooklyn	18–4–2	—	13–9	14–8	14–8	18–4	12–10	11–11–1
Chicago	11–11	9–13	—	8–14	9–13	14–8–1	9–13	10–12
Cincinnati	13–9	8–14	14–8	—	15–7	16–6	12–10	10–12
New York	16–6	8–14	13–9	7–15	—	16–6	8–14–2	6–15–1
Philadelphia	8–14	4–18	8–14–1	6–16	6–16	—	6–16	5–17
Pittsburgh	12–10	10–12	13–9	10–12	14–8–2	16–6	—	6–16
St. Louis	14–8	11–11–1	12–10	12–10	15–6–1	17–5	16–6	—

=== Notable transactions ===
- September 2, 1941: Hank Gornicki was purchased by the Cubs from the St. Louis Cardinals.
- September 22, 1941: The purchase of Hank Gornicki's contract by the Cubs from the Cardinals was voided, and Gornicki was returned to the Cardinals.

=== Roster ===
1941 Chicago Cubs
Roster
Pitchers: 22 Dizzy Dean; 41 Vallie Eaves; 32 Paul Erickson; 14 Larry French; 20 Hank Gornicki; 20 Emil Kush; 3 Walt Lanfranconi; 11 Bill Lee; 17 Russ Meers; 25 Jake Mooty; 23 Vern Olsen; 41 Vance Page; 13 Claude Passeau; 40 Tot Pressnell; 4,16,18 Wimpy Quinn; 14,16 Ken Raffensberger; 17 Charlie Root; 7 Johnny Schmitz	Catchers: 24 Greek George; 5,21 Clyde McCullough; 33 Bob Scheffing; Infielders: 16 Babe Dahlgren; 6 Stan Hack; 4 Billy Herman; 12 Johnny Hudson; 35 Lennie Merullo; 5,10 Billy Myers; 12 Rip Russell; 15 Lou Stringer; 28 Bobby Sturgeon; 27 Eddie Waitkus	Outfielders: 44 Phil Cavarretta; 31 Dom Dallessandro; 7 Augie Galan; 4 Charlie Gilbert; 21 Frank Jelincich; 9 Hank Leiber; 8 Bill Nicholson; 19,26 Lou Novikoff; 19,29 Barney Olsen; Other batters: 2 Al Todd	Manager: 1 Jimmie Wilson; Coaches: 38 Kiki Cuyler; 22 Dizzy Dean; 38 Charlie Grimm; 37 Dick Spalding

== Player stats ==
= Indicates team leader

= Indicates league leader

=== Batting ===
==== Starters by position ====
Note: Pos = Position; G = Games played; AB = At bats; H = Hits; Avg. = Batting average; HR = Home runs; RBI = Runs batted in

Pos	Player	G	AB	H	Avg.	HR	RBI
C	Clyde McCullough	125	418	95	.227	9	53
1B	Babe Dahlgren	99	359	101	.281	16	59
2B	Lou Stringer	145	512	126	.246	5	53
SS	Bobby Sturgeon	129	433	106	.245	0	25
3B	Stan Hack	151	586	186	.317	7	45
OF	Bill Nicholson	147	532	135	.254	26	98
OF	Phil Cavarretta	107	346	99	.286	6	40
OF	Dom Dallessandro	140	486	132	.272	6	85

==== Other batters ====
Note: G = Games played; AB = At bats; H = Hits; Avg. = Batting average; HR = Home runs; RBI = Runs batted in

Player	G	AB	H	Avg.	HR	RBI
Lou Novikoff	62	203	49	.241	5	24
Hank Leiber	53	162	35	.216	7	25
Bob Scheffing	51	132	32	.242	1	20
Augie Galan	65	120	25	.208	1	13
Johnny Hudson	50	99	20	.202	0	6
Charlie Gilbert	39	86	24	.279	0	12
Barney Olsen	24	73	21	.288	1	4
Greek George	35	64	10	.156	0	6
Billy Myers	24	63	14	.222	1	4
Billy Herman	11	36	7	.194	0	0
Eddie Waitkus	12	28	5	.179	0	0
Lennie Merullo	7	17	6	.353	0	1
Rip Russell	6	17	5	.294	0	1
Frank Jelincich	4	8	1	.125	0	2
Al Todd	6	6	1	.167	0	0

=== Pitching ===
==== Starting pitchers ====
Note: G = Games pitched; IP = Innings pitched; W = Wins; L = Losses; ERA = Earned run average; SO = Strikeouts

Player	G	IP	W	L	ERA	SO
Claude Passeau	34	231.0	14	14	3.35	80
Bill Lee	28	167.1	8	14	3.76	62
Larry French	26	138.0	5	14	4.63	60
Charlie Root	19	106.2	8	7	5.40	46
Russ Meers	1	8.0	0	1	1.13	5
Dizzy Dean	1	1.0	0	0	18.00	1

==== Other pitchers ====
Note: G = Games pitched; IP = Innings pitched; W = Wins; L = Losses; ERA = Earned run average; SO = Strikeouts

Player	G	IP	W	L	ERA	SO
Vern Olsen	37	185.2	10	8	3.15	73
Jake Mooty	33	153.1	8	9	3.35	45
Paul Erickson	32	141.0	5	7	3.70	85
Vallie Eaves	12	58.2	3	3	3.53	24
Johnny Schmitz	5	20.2	2	0	1.31	11
Walt Lanfranconi	2	6.0	0	1	3.00	1

==== Relief pitchers ====
Note: G = Games pitched; W = Wins; L = Losses; SV = Saves; ERA = Earned run average; SO = Strikeouts

Player	G	W	L	SV	ERA	SO
Tot Pressnell	29	5	3	1	3.09	27
Vance Page	25	2	2	1	4.28	17
Ken Raffensberger	10	0	1	0	4.50	5
Wimpy Quinn	3	0	0	0	7.20	0
Emil Kush	2	0	0	0	2.25	2
Hank Gornicki	1	0	0	0	4.50	2

== Farm system ==
Level	Team	League	Manager
AA	Los Angeles Angels	Pacific Coast League	Jigger Statz
A1	Tulsa Oilers	Texas League	Roy Johnson
B	Portsmouth Cubs	Piedmont League	Don Curry
B	Macon Peaches	Sally League	Milt Stock
C	Bisbee Bees	Arizona-Texas League	Carl Dittmar
C	Stockton Fliers	California League	Keith Frazier
C	Zanesville Cubs	Middle Atlantic League	Jack Warner
C	Muskogee Reds	Western Association	Jack Mealey
D	Lake Charles Skippers	Evangeline League	Jim Lawrence
D	Janesville Cubs	Wisconsin State League	Eddie Stumpf
