= Bill Harman =

American baseball player (1919-2007)

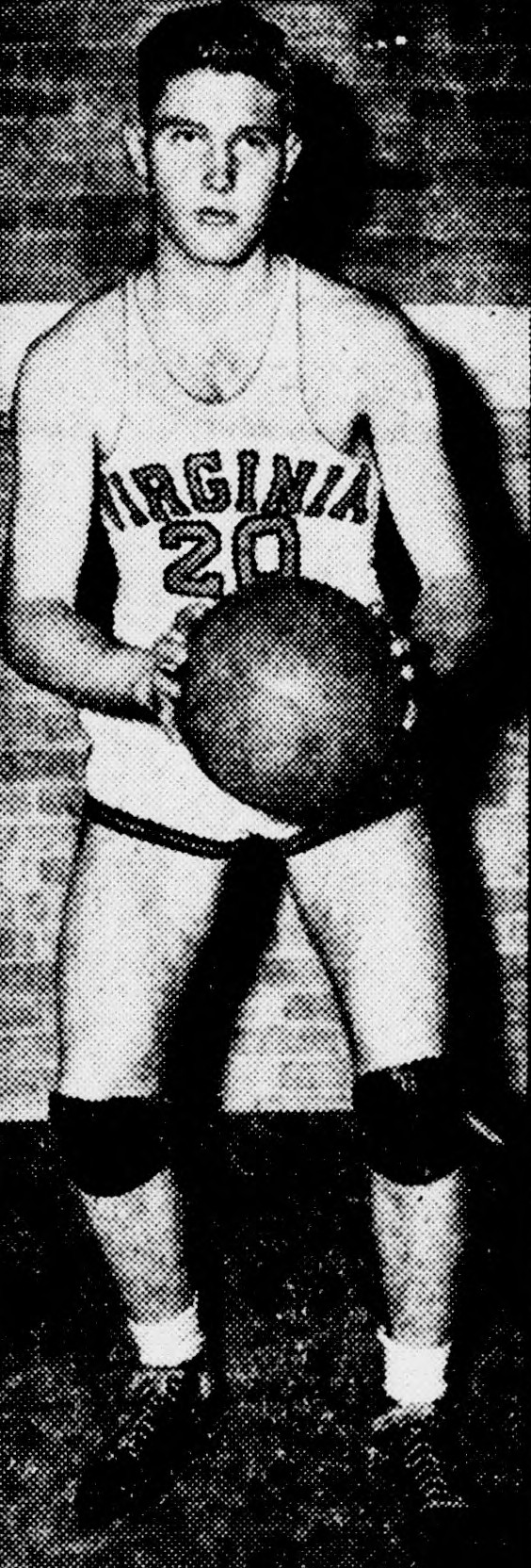
- Harman during his time with the Virginia Cavaliers men's basketball team, circa 1939.
- Pitcher / Catcher
- Born: January 2, 1919; Bridgewater, Virginia
- Died: September 22, 2007 (aged 88); Greenville, Delaware
- Batted: Right Threw: Right

MLB debut
- June 17, 1941, for the Philadelphia Phillies

Last MLB appearance
- September 18, 1941, for the Philadelphia Phillies

MLB statistics
- Win–loss record: 0–0
- Earned run average: 4.85
- Strikeouts: 3
- Batting average: .071
- Home runs: 0
- Runs batted in: 0
- Stats at Baseball Reference

Teams
- Philadelphia Phillies (1941)

William Bell Harman (January 2, 1919 – September 22, 2007) was a professional baseball player. After graduating from the University of Virginia, Harman played one season for the Philadelphia Phillies of Major League Baseball and finished his professional career in the minor leagues. During his Phillies tenure, he was officially listed as standing 6 feet 4 inches (193 cm)—the tallest catcher in major league history to that point—and weighing 200 pounds (91 kg).

== Early life and college ==
Bill Harman was born on January 2, 1919, in Bridgewater, Virginia. After graduating from high school, he attended the University of Virginia, where he played basketball and baseball for the Cavaliers and was the student body president. In the 1940 season, the Cavaliers were Virginia state baseball champions, finishing with an 18–4 win–loss record as Harman served as both a pitcher and a catcher for the team. In 1941, Harman's final collegiate season, he opened the year with a strong performance against Dartmouth, with a two-run home run in the fourth inning of the season's second contest. Against Pittsburgh in the season's fourth game, Harman took the mound in the ninth inning after catching the first eight frames, and struck out the side on 11 pitches. For the 1941 season, the Cavaliers finished with an 11–8 record, while Harman himself batted .350 and hit eight home runs. Harman graduated from Virginia after the season "with honors and a degree of Bachelor of Science" and was signed by the Philadelphia Phillies immediately thereafter.

== Professional career ==
=== Philadelphia Phillies ===
Harman made his major league debut for the Phillies on June 17, 1941, pinch hitting for Rube Melton against the St. Louis Cardinals. His first games as catcher and pitcher came on the same day; he replaced Mickey Livingston at catcher in the first game of a doubleheader against the Cincinnati Reds—making an out in his only at-bat—and then entering the day's second contest as a pitcher in relief of Lee Grissom, allowing one earned run on two hits and one walk in his only inning of work. On June 30, Harman relieved Johnny Podgajny, allowing three runs on four hits against the Brooklyn Dodgers, walking two batters and striking out one.

In July, Harman participated in an exhibition game against a United States Army team drawn from the 44th Infantry Division. Harman pitched in the contest before a crowd of 10,000; the Phillies won, 15–0, as the Army team managed only four hits. His first, and only, major-league hit came on August 2 against the Cardinals, when he entered as a mid-game replacement at catcher for Bennie Warren. He singled against Redbirds starter Howie Krist and was later driven in to score his first major league run. He pitched four innings on August 18 after starter Boom-Boom Beck gave up four runs in 1/3 inning. He allowed three runs (two earned) in that outing, walking three. He appeared in six more games in September, all short appearances with one at-bat save one: a three-inning, one-run pitching appearance on September 23 against the New York Giants. Harman appeared in 15 games during the season, accumulating a .071 batting average with his lone hit in 14 at-bats, and allowing 8 runs in 13 innings; all 15 games in which he appeared were Phillies losses.

=== Minor leagues ===
In 1942, Harman played for the Petersburg Rebels, a class-C team in the Virginia League, where he batted .197 with four doubles and one home run. He caught in 17 games, making 85 putouts, 6 assists and 2 errors for a .978 fielding percentage. He left minor league baseball to become the head coach at Waynesboro High School in Waynesboro, Virginia during the 1943 season, but resigned, purportedly to take a position with an insurance company. He returned to the minor leagues in 1944, resurfacing with the class-D Wellsville Yankees, but did not appear in any games.

== Later life ==
During his season coaching at Waynesboro, Harman married Janet Cline of Staunton, Virginia. He also served in the United States Marine Corps. Harman died on September 22, 2007, in Greenville, Delaware, and was interred at Lower Brandywine Cemetery in Wilmington.
