= Jim Carlin =

Jim Carlin may refer to:

- Jim Carlin (baseball) (1918–2003), American baseball player
- Jim Carlin (politician) (born 1962), American politician
