= 1941 Pittsburgh Pirates season =

1941 Pittsburgh Pirates
- League: National League
- Ballpark: Forbes Field
- City: Pittsburgh, Pennsylvania
- Record: 81–73 (.526)
- League place: 4th
- Owners: Bill Benswanger
- Managers: Frankie Frisch
- Radio: KDKA; WWSW; Rosey Rowswell, Jack Craddock

The 1941 Pittsburgh Pirates was a season in American baseball. The team finished fourth in the National League with a record of 81–73, 19 games behind the first-place Brooklyn Dodgers.

== Regular season ==
=== Season standings ===
National League
Team	W	L	Pct.	GB	Home	Road
Brooklyn Dodgers	100	54	.649	—	52‍–‍25	48‍–‍29
St. Louis Cardinals	97	56	.634	2½	53‍–‍24	44‍–‍32
Cincinnati Reds	88	66	.571	12	45‍–‍34	43‍–‍32
Pittsburgh Pirates	81	73	.526	19	45‍–‍32	36‍–‍41
New York Giants	74	79	.484	25½	38‍–‍39	36‍–‍40
Chicago Cubs	70	84	.455	30	38‍–‍39	32‍–‍45
Boston Braves	62	92	.403	38	32‍–‍44	30‍–‍48
Philadelphia Phillies	43	111	.279	57	23‍–‍52	20‍–‍59

=== Record vs. opponents ===
1941 National League record Sources:
Team	BSN	BRO	CHC	CIN	NYG	PHI	PIT	STL
Boston	—	4–18–2	11–11	9–13	6–16	14–8	10–12	8–14
Brooklyn	18–4–2	—	13–9	14–8	14–8	18–4	12–10	11–11–1
Chicago	11–11	9–13	—	8–14	9–13	14–8–1	9–13	10–12
Cincinnati	13–9	8–14	14–8	—	15–7	16–6	12–10	10–12
New York	16–6	8–14	13–9	7–15	—	16–6	8–14–2	6–15–1
Philadelphia	8–14	4–18	8–14–1	6–16	6–16	—	6–16	5–17
Pittsburgh	12–10	10–12	13–9	10–12	14–8–2	16–6	—	6–16
St. Louis	14–8	11–11–1	12–10	12–10	15–6–1	17–5	16–6	—

=== Game log ===
1941 Game Log: 81–73 (Home: 45–32; Away: 36–41)
April: 3–10 (Home: 2–3; Away: 1–7)

#	Date	Opponent	Score	Win	Loss	Save	Attendance	Record
1	April 15	@ Cubs	4–7	Passeau	**Klinger** (0–1)	—	17,008	0–1
2	April 17	@ Cubs	7–2	**Sewell** (1–0)	Olsen	—	4,109	1–1
3	April 18	Reds	4–1	**Butcher** (1–0)	Walters	—	18,644	2–1
4	April 19	Reds	3–5	Derringer	**Bauers** (0–1)	—	10,465	2–2
5	April 20	Reds	3–7	Turner	**Bowman** (0–1)	Thompson	19,060	2–3
6	April 22	@ Cardinals	8–9 (12)	Grodzicki	**Heintzelman** (0–1)	—	1,776	2–4
7	April 23	@ Cardinals	1–3	Nahem	**Butcher** (1–1)	—	1,875	2–5
8	April 24	Cubs	2–1 (11)	**Lanning** (1–0)	French	—	1,959	3–5
9	April 25	Cubs	7–8	Page	**Heintzelman** (0–2)	—	3,902	3–6
10	April 26	@ Reds	3–10	Vander Meer	**Bauers** (0–2)	—	8,112	3–7
11	April 27	@ Reds	2–3	Walters	**Sewell** (1–1)	—	19,114	3–8
12	April 29	@ Phillies	2–6	Crouch	**Butcher** (1–2)	—	800	3–9
13	April 30	@ Phillies	4–8	Blanton	**Lanahan** (0–1)	—	3,385	3–10

May: 11–11 (Home: 7–4; Away: 4–7)

#	Date	Opponent	Score	Win	Loss	Save	Attendance	Record
14	May 1	@ Phillies	15–2	**Bauers** (1–2)	Johnson	—	1,500	4–10
15	May 2	@ Giants	7–7 (13)			—	3,268	4–10
16	May 3	@ Giants	3–2	**Butcher** (2–2)	Bowman	—	7,417	5–10
17	May 4	@ Dodgers	6–4	**Heintzelman** (1–2)	Hamlin	—	27,015	6–10
18	May 6	@ Dodgers	3–7	Wyatt	**Sewell** (1–2)	—	7,443	6–11
19	May 7	@ Braves	6–7	Tobin	**Lanning** (1–1)	—	2,458	6–12
20	May 11	Cardinals	4–7	Nahem	**Butcher** (2–3)	Hutchinson	12,388	6–13
21	May 12	Cardinals	2–6	Warneke	**Heintzelman** (1–3)	—	—	6–14
22	May 13	Phillies	6–3	**Sewell** (2–2)	Grissom	—	986	7–14
23	May 14	Phillies	12–7	**Klinger** (1–1)	Bruner	—	1,254	8–14
24	May 16	Dodgers	3–2 (11)	**Bowman** (1–1)	Brown	—	3,984	9–14
25	May 18	Giants	4–5	Adams	**Sewell** (2–3)	Brown	13,659	9–15
26	May 19	Giants	2–1	**Butcher** (3–3)	Hubbell	—	2,574	10–15
27	May 20	Giants	7–5	**Klinger** (2–1)	Schumacher	—	3,050	11–15
28	May 21	Braves	8–4	**Wilkie** (1–0)	Tobin	—	2,311	12–15
29	May 23	@ Cardinals	1–2	Cooper	**Butcher** (3–4)	—	18,555	12–16
30	May 24	@ Cardinals	7–10	Nahem	**Sewell** (2–4)	Lanier	2,952	12–17
31	May 25	@ Cardinals	4–6	Gumbert	**Wilkie** (1–1)	White	—	12–18
32	May 25	@ Cardinals	3–4	Krist	**Klinger** (2–2)	Lanier	18,749	12–19
33	May 26	@ Reds	3–7	Walters	**Strincevich** (0–1)	—	20,567	12–20
34	May 28	@ Reds	7–4	**Butcher** (4–4)	Moore	—	2,560	13–20
35	May 30	Cubs	6–7	Lee	**Sewell** (2–5)	—	—	13–21
36	May 30	Cubs	5–4	**Sewell** (3–5)	Passeau	—	17,297	14–21

June: 14–12 (Home: 5–7; Away: 9–5)

#	Date	Opponent	Score	Win	Loss	Save	Attendance	Record
37	June 2	@ Braves	0–2	Errickson	**Lanning** (1–2)	—	1,034	14–22
38	June 3	@ Braves	9–5	**Heintzelman** (2–3)	LaManna	**Bowman** (1)	1,776	15–22
39	June 6	@ Giants	5–4	**Butcher** (5–4)	McGee	—	—	16–22
40	June 6	@ Giants	4–3	**Sewell** (4–5)	Lohrman	—	8,324	17–22
41	June 7	@ Phillies	0–2	Blanton	**Lanning** (1–3)	—	3,802	17–23
42	June 8	@ Phillies	12–2	**Bowman** (2–1)	Hughes	**Sewell** (1)	—	18–23
43	June 8	@ Phillies	2–5	Podgajny	**Bauers** (1–3)	—	—	18–24
44	June 9	@ Phillies	5–0	**Wilkie** (2–1)	Grissom	—	892	19–24
45	June 10	@ Dodgers	3–4	Fitzsimmons	**Heintzelman** (2–4)	—	6,426	19–25
46	June 11	@ Dodgers	8–1	**Sewell** (5–5)	Higbe	—	30,469	20–25
47	June 14	Braves	8–2	**Butcher** (6–4)	Salvo	—	2,908	21–25
48	June 15	Braves	1–5	Posedel	**Wilkie** (2–2)	—	12,562	21–26
49	June 17	Giants	3–6	Hubbell	**Sewell** (5–6)	—	1,586	21–27
50	June 18	Giants	2–2 (11)			—	24,738	21–27
51	June 19	Giants	6–9	Brown	**Heintzelman** (2–5)	—	2,127	21–28
52	June 20	Phillies	7–6	**Dietz** (1–0)	Pearson	—	1,046	22–28
53	June 21	Phillies	2–0	**Bowman** (3–1)	Grissom	—	2,321	23–28
54	June 22	Phillies	4–1	**Sewell** (6–6)	Blanton	—	—	24–28
55	June 22	Phillies	4–7	Hughes	**Butcher** (6–5)	Johnson	10,060	24–29
56	June 23	Dodgers	4–9	Fitzsimmons	**Klinger** (2–3)	Brown	2,335	24–30
57	June 24	Dodgers	0–8	Davis	**Lanning** (1–4)	—	20,537	24–31
58	June 25	Dodgers	4–5	Higbe	**Heintzelman** (2–6)	—	2,425	24–32
59	June 27	@ Cubs	4–2	**Sewell** (7–6)	Passeau	—	4,622	25–32
60	June 28	@ Cubs	2–3	Olsen	**Butcher** (6–6)	—	3,654	25–33
61	June 29	@ Cubs	8–2	**Lanning** (2–4)	French	—	—	26–33
62	June 29	@ Cubs	3–2	**Sullivan** (1–0)	Lee	**Sewell** (2)	17,440	27–33
63	June 30	Cardinals	4–3	**Heintzelman** (3–6)	Gumbert	—	16,306	28–33

July: 22–9 (Home: 13–3; Away: 9–6)

#	Date	Opponent	Score	Win	Loss	Save	Attendance	Record
64	July 1	Cardinals	7–11	Warneke	**Sewell** (7–7)	—	—	28–34
65	July 2	Reds	8–3	**Butcher** (7–6)	Derringer	—	1,941	29–34
66	July 4	@ Reds	0–6	Walters	**Lanning** (2–5)	—	—	29–35
67	July 4	@ Reds	6–4	**Heintzelman** (4–6)	Pearson	—	14,391	30–35
68	July 5	Cubs	9–6	**Sullivan** (2–0)	Lee	**Klinger** (1)	4,571	31–35
69	July 6	Cubs	2–1	**Sewell** (8–7)	Passeau	—	—	32–35
70	July 6	Cubs	13–4 (8)	**Butcher** (8–6)	Root	**Lanning** (1)	14,306	33–35
71	July 10	@ Phillies	6–3	**Sewell** (9–7)	Hughes	**Sullivan** (1)	—	34–35
72	July 12	@ Phillies	6–1	**Lanning** (3–5)	Podgajny	—	1,500	35–35
73	July 13	@ Giants	4–0	**Heintzelman** (5–6)	Lohrman	—	—	36–35
74	July 13	@ Giants	2–8	Schumacher	**Butcher** (8–7)	—	22,865	36–36
75	July 14	@ Giants	2–3	Hubbell	**Sewell** (9–8)	—	3,125	36–37
76	July 15	@ Giants	5–1	**Butcher** (9–7)	Melton	—	3,296	37–37
77	July 16	@ Braves	1–4	Tobin	**Lanning** (3–6)	—	—	37–38
78	July 16	@ Braves	13–5	**Dietz** (2–0)	Hutchings	**Wilkie** (1)	3,278	38–38
79	July 18	@ Braves	5–1	**Heintzelman** (6–6)	Johnson	—	—	39–38
80	July 18	@ Braves	3–4	LaManna	**Wilkie** (2–3)	—	3,315	39–39
81	July 20	@ Dodgers	1–5	Davis	**Sewell** (9–9)	—	—	39–40
82	July 20	@ Dodgers	5–1	**Lanning** (4–6)	Wyatt	—	—	40–40
83	July 21	@ Dodgers	8–3	**Heintzelman** (7–6)	Kimball	—	—	41–40
84	July 22	Phillies	4–3	**Klinger** (3–3)	Podgajny	—	1,730	42–40
85	July 23	Phillies	5–2	**Butcher** (10–7)	Blanton	—	13,109	43–40
86	July 24	Phillies	3–2	**Klinger** (4–3)	Grissom	—	1,326	44–40
87	July 25	Dodgers	8–4	**Sullivan** (3–0)	Wyatt	—	—	45–40
88	July 25	Dodgers	8–2	**Lanning** (5–6)	Davis	—	—	46–40
89	July 26	Dodgers	2–3	Hamlin	**Heintzelman** (7–7)	Higbe	7,009	46–41
90	July 27	Dodgers	4–3	**Klinger** (5–3)	Davis	—	—	47–41
91	July 27	Dodgers	8–0 (8)	**Sewell** (10–9)	Casey	—	40,093	48–41
92	July 29	Braves	5–3 (8)	**Sullivan** (4–0)	Javery	**Klinger** (2)	4,860	49–41
93	July 30	Braves	2–3 (10)	Tobin	**Bowman** (3–2)	—	11,362	49–42
94	July 31	Braves	9–8	**Lanning** (6–6)	Errickson	**Dietz** (1)	1,870	50–42

August: 18–15 (Home: 5–4; Away: 13–11)

#	Date	Opponent	Score	Win	Loss	Save	Attendance	Record
95	August 1	Giants	6–3	**Butcher** (11–7)	Hubbell	—	4,324	51–42
96	August 2	Giants	0–2 (10)	Schumacher	**Sewell** (10–10)	—	5,550	51–43
97	August 3	Giants	5–4	**Dietz** (3–0)	McGee	—	—	52–43
98	August 3	Giants	10–4 (6)	**Klinger** (6–3)	Wittig	—	25,688	53–43
99	August 4	@ Reds	4–1	**Lanning** (7–6)	Thompson	—	2,109	54–43
100	August 5	@ Reds	7–5	**Butcher** (12–7)	Turner	**Klinger** (3)	2,390	55–43
101	August 6	@ Cubs	13–3	**Sewell** (11–10)	Pressnell	—	5,574	56–43
102	August 7	@ Cubs	4–3	**Dietz** (4–0)	Mooty	—	5,035	57–43
103	August 8	@ Cubs	0–1	Erickson	**Lanning** (7–7)	—	5,846	57–44
104	August 9	@ Cardinals	5–4 (13)	**Klinger** (7–3)	Hutchinson	—	5,223	58–44
105	August 10	@ Cardinals	2–3	White	**Sewell** (11–11)	Crouch	—	58–45
106	August 10	@ Cardinals	2–4	Cooper	**Heintzelman** (7–8)	—	26,513	58–46
107	August 13	Cubs	4–6	Eaves	**Lanning** (7–8)	Mooty	24,373	58–47
108	August 14	Cubs	2–6	Passeau	**Butcher** (12–8)	—	3,032	58–48
109	August 16	Cardinals	4–2	**Heintzelman** (8–8)	White	—	—	59–48
110	August 17	Cardinals	1–7	Cooper	**Butcher** (12–9)	—	—	59–49
111	August 17	Cardinals	8–2	**Sewell** (12–11)	Warneke	—	34,292	60–49
112	August 18	@ Dodgers	5–6	Casey	**Butcher** (12–10)	—	9,832	60–50
113	August 19	@ Dodgers	0–9	Davis	**Sullivan** (4–1)	—	—	60–51
114	August 19	@ Dodgers	2–6	Drake	**Heintzelman** (8–9)	Casey	9,372	60–52
115	August 20	@ Dodgers	6–7	Allen	**Sewell** (12–12)	—	14,752	60–53
116	August 21	@ Giants	5–3	**Butcher** (13–10)	McGee	—	11,845	61–53
117	August 22	@ Giants	5–3	**Lanning** (8–8)	Bowman	—	2,439	62–53
118	August 23	@ Giants	3–5	Schumacher	**Dietz** (4–1)	—	—	62–54
119	August 23	@ Giants	4–3	**Klinger** (8–3)	Brown	—	—	63–54
120	August 24	@ Braves	3–4 (12)	Salvo	**Sewell** (12–13)	—	—	63–55
121	August 24	@ Braves	7–3 (6)	**Klinger** (9–3)	Javery	—	13,411	64–55
122	August 26	@ Braves	3–4	Tobin	**Wilkie** (2–4)	—	—	64–56
123	August 26	@ Braves	6–1	**Butcher** (14–10)	Errickson	—	3,527	65–56
124	August 27	@ Phillies	12–2	**Lanning** (9–8)	Blanton	—	1,748	66–56
125	August 28	@ Phillies	3–2	**Dietz** (5–1)	Pearson	**Klinger** (4)	5,500	67–56
126	August 30	@ Cubs	1–4	Erickson	**Sewell** (12–14)	—	6,777	67–57
127	August 31	@ Cubs	4–3	**Butcher** (15–10)	Passeau	—	—	68–57

September: 13–16 (Home: 13–11; Away: 0–5)

#	Date	Opponent	Score	Win	Loss	Save	Attendance	Record
128	September 1	@ Cardinals	3–5	White	**Heintzelman** (8–10)	—	—	68–58
129	September 1	@ Cardinals	3–6 (8)	Pollet	**Klinger** (9–4)	—	34,812	68–59
130	September 3	Reds	3–2	**Lanning** (10–8)	Riddle	—	18,428	69–59
131	September 4	Reds	4–0 (5)	**Sewell** (13–14)	Walters	—	1,720	70–59
132	September 5	Reds	4–10	Derringer	**Butcher** (15–11)	Beggs	—	70–60
133	September 5	Reds	1–0 (7)	**Dietz** (6–1)	Starr	—	4,897	71–60
134	September 6	Cubs	6–4	**Heintzelman** (9–10)	Mooty	—	3,040	72–60
135	September 7	Cubs	1–3	Eaves	**Lanning** (10–9)	—	6,619	72–61
136	September 9	Giants	2–4 (10)	Schumacher	**Sewell** (13–15)	—	1,873	72–62
137	September 10	Giants	10–7	**Lanning** (11–9)	Lohrman	**Wilkie** (2)	1,076	73–62
138	September 11	Braves	7–5	**Heintzelman** (10–10)	Hutchings	—	—	74–62
139	September 11	Braves	0–10	Earley	**Gee** (0–1)	—	2,320	74–63
140	September 12	Braves	6–3	**Dietz** (7–1)	Johnson	—	—	75–63
141	September 12	Braves	0–5	Javery	**Lanning** (11–10)	—	2,083	75–64
142	September 13	Braves	1–0	**Strincevich** (1–1)	Salvo	—	—	76–64
143	September 14	Phillies	2–1	**Butcher** (16–11)	Hoerst	—	—	77–64
144	September 14	Phillies	3–6	Hughes	**Sewell** (13–16)	—	7,495	77–65
145	September 17	Dodgers	4–6	Davis	**Heintzelman** (10–11)	Hamlin	6,206	77–66
146	September 18	Dodgers	6–5	**Sewell** (14–16)	Casey	—	6,803	78–66
147	September 20	@ Reds	1–2	Walters	**Butcher** (16–12)	—	—	78–67
148	September 20	@ Reds	3–7	Derringer	**Strincevich** (1–2)	—	9,817	78–68
149	September 21	@ Reds	0–2	Riddle	**Dietz** (7–2)	—	10,248	78–69
150	September 23	Cardinals	4–0	**Heintzelman** (11–11)	Cooper	—	—	79–69
151	September 23	Cardinals	0–9	Lanier	**Sewell** (14–17)	—	—	79–70
152	September 24	Cardinals	0–4	Gumbert	**Lanning** (11–11)	—	—	79–71
153	September 25	Cardinals	3–1	**Butcher** (17–12)	White	—	—	80–71
154	September 26	Reds	3–4	Vander Meer	**Brandt** (0–1)	—	717	80–72
155	September 27	Reds	9–15	Riddle	**Gee** (0–2)	Beggs	1,695	80–73
156	September 28	Reds	3–2	**Clemensen** (1–0)	Walters	—	4,137	81–73

Legend: = Win = Loss = Tie
Bold = Pirates team member

=== Roster ===
1941 Pittsburgh Pirates
**Roster**
**Pitchers**: 31 Russ Bauers; 21 Joe Bowman; 24 Bill Brandt; 25 Mace Brown; 19 Max Butcher; 21,37 Bill Clemensen; 37 Dick Conger; 22 Dutch Dietz; 24 Johnny Gee; 32 Ken Heintzelman; 20 Bob Klinger; 28 Dick Lanahan; 29 Johnny Lanning; 30 Rip Sewell; 25 Nick Strincevich; 26 Joe Sullivan; 39 Lefty Wilkie	**Catchers**: 7 Bill Baker; 11 Spud Davis; 12 Al López; 38 Joe Schultz; 8 Vinnie Smith; **Infielders**: 15 Alf Anderson; 2 Ripper Collins; 38 Billy Cox; 3 Elbie Fletcher; 18 Debs Garms; 16 Frankie Gustine; 6 Lee Handley; 10 Ed Leip; 4 Stu Martin; 21 Arky Vaughan	**Outfielders**: 9 Vince DiMaggio; 8 Bob Elliott; -- Culley Rikard; 14 Bud Stewart; 17 Maurice Van Robays; 10 Lloyd Waner	**Manager**: 35 Frankie Frisch; **Coaches**: 11 Spud Davis; 34 Jake Flowers; 36 Mike Kelly; 33 Honus Wagner

== Player stats ==
= Indicates team leader

=== Batting ===
==== Starters by position ====
Note: Pos = Position; G = Games played; AB = At bats; H = Hits; Avg. = Batting average; HR = Home runs; RBI = Runs batted in

Pos	Player	G	AB	H	Avg.	HR	RBI
C	Al Lopez	114	317	84	.265	5	43
1B	Elbie Fletcher	151	521	150	.288	11	74
2B	Frankie Gustine	121	463	125	.270	1	46
3B	Lee Handley	124	459	132	.288	0	33
SS	Arky Vaughan	106	374	118	.316	6	38
LF	Maurice Van Robays	129	457	129	.282	4	78
CF	Vince DiMaggio	151	528	141	.267	21	100
RF	Bob Elliott	141	527	144	.273	3	76

==== Other batters ====
Note: G = Games played; AB = At bats; H = Hits; Avg. = Batting average; HR = Home runs; RBI = Runs batted in

Player	G	AB	H	Avg.	HR	RBI
Stu Martin	88	233	71	.305	0	19
Alf Anderson	70	223	48	.215	1	10
Debs Garms	83	220	58	.264	3	42
Bud Stewart	73	172	46	.267	0	10
Spud Davis	57	107	27	.252	0	6
Bill Baker	35	67	15	.224	0	6
Ripper Collins	49	62	13	.210	0	11
Billy Cox	10	37	10	.270	0	2
Vinnie Smith	9	33	10	.303	0	5
Ed Leip	15	25	5	.200	0	3
Culley Rikard	6	20	4	.200	0	0
Lloyd Waner	3	4	1	.250	0	1
Joe Schultz	2	2	1	.500	0	0

=== Pitching ===
= Indicates league leader

==== Starting pitchers ====
Note: G = Games pitched; IP = Innings pitched; W = Wins; L = Losses; ERA = Earned run average; SO = Strikeouts

Player	G	IP	W	L	ERA	SO
Rip Sewell	39	249.0	14	17	3.72	76
Max Butcher	33	236.0	17	12	3.05	61
Ken Heintzelman	35	196.0	11	11	3.44	81
Johnny Lanning	34	175.2	11	11	3.13	41

==== Other pitchers ====
Note: G = Games pitched; IP = Innings pitched; W = Wins; L = Losses; ERA = Earned run average; SO = Strikeouts

Player	G	IP	W	L	ERA	SO
Bob Klinger	35	116.2	9	4	3.93	36
Dutch Dietz	33	100.1	7	2	2.33	22
Lefty Wilkie	26	79.0	2	4	4.56	16
Joe Bowman	18	69.1	3	2	2.99	22
Joe Sullivan	16	39.1	4	1	2.97	10
Russ Bauers	8	37.1	1	3	5.54	20
Nick Strincevich	12	31.0	1	2	5.23	12
Bill Clemensen	2	13.0	1	0	2.77	4
Johnny Gee	3	7.1	0	2	6.14	2
Bill Brandt	2	7.0	0	1	3.86	0
Dick Conger	2	4.0	0	0	0.00	2

==== Relief pitchers ====
Note: G = Games pitched; W = Wins; L = Losses; SV = Saves; ERA = Earned run average; SO = Strikeouts

Player	G	W	L	SV	ERA	SO
Dick Lanahan	7	0	1	0	5.25	5
Mace Brown	1	0	0	0	0.00	0

== Awards and honors ==
1941 Major League Baseball All-Star Game

- Arky Vaughan, starter, SS
- Bob Elliott, reserve
- Al López, reserve

=== League top five finishers ===
Vince DiMaggio

- #3 in NL in RBI (100)

Elbie Fletcher

- NL leader in on-base percentage (.421)

Rip Sewell

- NL leader in losses (17)

== Farm system ==
Level	Team	League	Manager
A	Albany Senators	Eastern League	Specs Toporcer
B	Harrisburg Senators	Interstate League	Les Bell
C	Gloversville-Johnstown Glovers	Canadian–American League	Buster Blakeney
C	Hutchinson Pirates	Western Association	Johnny Gooch
D	Moultrie Packers	Georgia–Florida League	Buzz Arlitt
D	Oil City Oilers	Pennsylvania State Association	George Norton
D	London Pirates	PONY League	Jimmy Jordan

LEAGUE CHAMPIONS: Harrisburg
