= 1941 Brooklyn Dodgers season =

1941 Brooklyn Dodgers
- National League champion
- League: National League
- Ballpark: Ebbets Field
- City: Brooklyn, New York
- Record: 100–54 (.649)
- League place: 1st
- Owners: James & Dearie Mulvey, Brooklyn Trust Company
- President: Larry MacPhail
- Managers: Leo Durocher
- Radio: WOR; Red Barber, Al Helfer

The 1941 Brooklyn Dodgers, led by manager Leo Durocher, won their first pennant in 21 years, edging the St. Louis Cardinals by 2.5 games. They went on to lose to the New York Yankees in the World Series.

In The New Bill James Historical Baseball Abstract, this team was referenced as one of "The Greatest Teams That Never Was", due to the quality of its starting lineup. Dolph Camilli was the slugging star with 34 home runs and 120 RBI. He was voted the National League's Most Valuable Player. Pete Reiser, a 22-year-old rookie, led the league in batting average, slugging percentage, and runs scored. Other regulars included Hall of Famers Billy Herman, Joe Medwick, Pee Wee Reese, and Dixie Walker. Not surprisingly, the Dodgers scored the most runs of any NL team (800).

The pitching staff featured a pair of 22-game winners, Kirby Higbe and Whitlow Wyatt, having their best pro seasons.

On July 1, the Dodgers played the Phillies in Brooklyn; the game was televised by WNBT in New York (now WNBC), making the contest the first program aired by a commercial TV station in the United States. Although the Dodgers would later win the pennant and the Phillies would finish in last place in the NL, Philadelphia won the game 6–4, in 10 innings.

== Offseason ==
- November 11, 1940: Vito Tamulis, Bill Crouch, Mickey Livingston and cash were traded by the Dodgers to the Philadelphia Phillies for Kirby Higbe.
- November 19, 1940: Tot Pressnell was purchased from the Dodgers by the St. Louis Cardinals.
- December 1940: Boze Berger was traded by the Dodgers to the New York Yankees for Jack Graham.
- December 4, 1940: Glen Stewart was purchased by the Dodgers from the New York Giants.
- December 4, 1940: Gus Mancuso, minor leaguer John Pintar and cash were traded by the Dodgers to the St. Louis Cardinals for Mickey Owen.
- December 9, 1940: Pep Young was traded by the Dodgers to the Cincinnati Reds for Lew Riggs.
- January 27, 1941: Pep Rambert was purchased by the Dodgers from the Pittsburgh Pirates.
- February 4, 1941: Lefty Mills was purchased by the Dodgers from the St. Louis Browns.
- Prior to 1941 season: Wally Westlake was acquired from the Dodgers by the Merced Bears.

== Regular season ==
=== Season standings ===
National League
Team	W	L	Pct.	GB	Home	Road
Brooklyn Dodgers	100	54	.649	—	52‍–‍25	48‍–‍29
St. Louis Cardinals	97	56	.634	2½	53‍–‍24	44‍–‍32
Cincinnati Reds	88	66	.571	12	45‍–‍34	43‍–‍32
Pittsburgh Pirates	81	73	.526	19	45‍–‍32	36‍–‍41
New York Giants	74	79	.484	25½	38‍–‍39	36‍–‍40
Chicago Cubs	70	84	.455	30	38‍–‍39	32‍–‍45
Boston Braves	62	92	.403	38	32‍–‍44	30‍–‍48
Philadelphia Phillies	43	111	.279	57	23‍–‍52	20‍–‍59

=== Record vs. opponents ===
1941 National League record Sources:
Team	BSN	BRO	CHC	CIN	NYG	PHI	PIT	STL
Boston	—	4–18–2	11–11	9–13	6–16	14–8	10–12	8–14
Brooklyn	18–4–2	—	13–9	14–8	14–8	18–4	12–10	11–11–1
Chicago	11–11	9–13	—	8–14	9–13	14–8–1	9–13	10–12
Cincinnati	13–9	8–14	14–8	—	15–7	16–6	12–10	10–12
New York	16–6	8–14	13–9	7–15	—	16–6	8–14–2	6–15–1
Philadelphia	8–14	4–18	8–14–1	6–16	6–16	—	6–16	5–17
Pittsburgh	12–10	10–12	13–9	10–12	14–8–2	16–6	—	6–16
St. Louis	14–8	11–11–1	12–10	12–10	15–6–1	17–5	16–6	—

=== Notable transactions ===
- April 3, 1941: Roxie Lawson was purchased by the Dodgers from the St. Louis Browns.
- April 15, 1941: Newt Kimball was purchased by the Dodgers from the St. Louis Cardinals.
- April 15, 1941: Lefty Mills was returned by the Dodgers to the St. Louis Browns.
- April 22, 1941: Mace Brown was purchased by the Dodgers from the Pittsburgh Pirates.
- May 6, 1941: Lee Grissom was traded by the Dodgers to the Philadelphia Phillies for Vito Tamulis.
- May 6, 1941: Johnny Hudson, Charlie Gilbert and cash were traded by the Dodgers to the Chicago Cubs for Billy Herman.
- August 14, 1941: Joe Becker, George Staller, and minor leaguers John S. Bell and Ray Roche were traded by the Dodgers to the Philadelphia Phillies for Dixie Howell.
- August 26, 1941: Mace Brown and cash were traded by the Dodgers to the Chicago Cubs for Augie Galan.

=== Roster ===
1941 Brooklyn Dodgers
Roster
Pitchers: 29 Ed Albosta; 22 Johnny Allen; 28,33 Mace Brown; 25 Hugh Casey; 32 Bob Chipman; 26 Curt Davis; 15 Tom Drake; 14 Freddie Fitzsimmons; 20 Larry French; 32 Lee Grissom; 12 Luke Hamlin; 15,13 Kirby Higbe; 21 Newt Kimball; 16 Van Mungo; 22 Bill Swift; 15 Vito Tamulis; 20 Kemp Wicker; 17 Whit Wyatt	Catchers: 19 Herman Franks; 6,38 Tony Giuliani; 10 Mickey Owen; 9 Babe Phelps; 47 George Pfister; Infielders: 4 Dolph Camilli; 3 Pete Coscarart; 2 Leo Durocher; 16 Billy Herman; 31 Alex Kampouris; 5 Cookie Lavagetto; 1 Pee Wee Reese; 18 Lew Riggs	Outfielders: 24 Augie Galan; 77,6 Joe Medwick; 27 Pete Reiser; 24 Tommy Tatum; 8 Joe Vosmik; 11 Dixie Walker; 24 Paul Waner; 8,29 Jimmy Wasdell	Manager: 2 Leo Durocher; Coaches: 7 Charlie Dressen; 30 Red Corriden

== Player stats ==
= Indicates team leader

= Indicates league leader

=== Batting ===
==== Starters by position ====
Note: Pos = Position; G = Games played; AB = At bats; R = Runs; H = Hits; Avg. = Batting average; HR = Home runs; RBI = Runs batted in; SB = Stolen bases

Pos	Player	GP	AB	R	H	Avg.	HR	RBI	SB
C	Mickey Owen	128	386	32	89	.231	1	44	1
1B	Dolph Camilli	149	529	92	151	.285	34	120	3
2B	Billy Herman	133	536	77	156	.291	3	41	1
3B	Cookie Lavagetto	132	441	75	122	.277	1	78	7
SS	Pee Wee Reese	152	595	76	136	.229	2	46	10
OF	Dixie Walker	148	531	88	165	.311	9	71	4
OF	Pete Reiser	137	536	117	184	.343	14	76	4
OF	Joe Medwick	133	538	100	171	.318	18	88	2

==== Other batters ====
Note: G = Games played; AB = At bats; R = Runs; H = Hits; Avg. = Batting average; HR = Home runs; RBI = Runs batted in; SB = Stolen bases

Player	GP	AB	R	H	Avg.	HR	RBI	SB
Jimmy Wasdell	94	265	39	79	.298	4	48	2
Lew Riggs	77	197	27	60	.305	5	36	1
Herman Franks	57	139	10	28	.201	1	11	0
Pete Coscarart	43	62	13	8	.129	0	5	1
Joe Vosmik	25	56	0	11	.196	0	4	0
Alex Kampouris	16	51	8	16	.314	2	9	0
Leo Durocher	18	42	2	12	.286	0	6	0
Paul Waner	11	35	5	6	.171	0	4	0
Babe Phelps	16	30	3	7	.233	2	4	0
Augie Galan	17	27	3	7	.259	0	4	0
Tommy Tatum	8	12	1	2	.167	0	1	0
Tony Giuliani	3	2	0	0	.000	0	0	0
George Pfister	1	2	0	0	.000	0	0	0

=== Pitching ===
==== Starting pitchers ====
Note: G = Games pitched; GS = Games started; CG = Complete games; IP = Innings pitched; W = Wins; L = Losses; ERA = Earned run average; BB = Bases on balls; SO = Strikeouts

Player	G	GS	CG	IP	W	L	ERA	BB	SO
Kirby Higbe	48	39	19	298.0	22	9	3.14	132	121
Whit Wyatt	38	35	23	288.1	22	10	2.34	82	176
Freddie Fitzsimmons	13	12	3	82.2	6	1	2.07	26	19
Ed Albosta	2	2	0	13.0	0	2	6.23	8	5

==== Other pitchers ====
Note: G = Games pitched; GS = Games started; CG = Complete games; IP = Innings pitched; W = Wins; L = Losses; ERA = Earned run average; BB = Bases on balls; SO = Strikeouts

Player	G	GS	CG	IP	W	L	ERA	BB	SO
Hugh Casey	45	18	4	162.0	14	11	3.89	57	61
Curt Davis	28	16	10	154.1	13	7	2.97	27	50
Luke Hamlin	30	20	5	136.0	8	8	4.24	41	58
Johnny Allen	11	4	2	57.1	3	0	2.51	12	21
Newt Kimball	15	5	1	52.0	3	1	3.63	29	17
Tom Drake	10	2	0	24.2	1	1	4.38	12	21
Larry French	6	1	0	15.2	0	0	3.45	4	8
Lee Grissom	4	1	0	11.1	0	0	2.38	8	5

Note: Hugh Casey was team leader in saves with 7.

==== Relief pitchers ====
Note: G = Games pitched; IP = Innings pitched; W = Wins; L = Losses; SV = Saves; ERA = Earned run average; BB = Bases on balls; SO = Strikeouts

Player	G	IP	W	L	SV	ERA	BB	SO
Mace Brown	24	42.2	3	2	3	3.16	26	22
Kemp Wicker	16	32.0	1	2	1	3.66	14	8
Vito Tamulis	12	22.0	0	0	1	3.68	10	8
Bill Swift	9	22.0	3	0	1	3.27	7	9
Bob Chipman	1	5.0	1	0	0	0.00	1	3
Van Mungo	2	2.0	0	0	0	4.50	2	0

== 1941 World Series ==
The 1941 World Series matched the New York Yankees against the Dodgers, with the Yankees winning in five games to capture their fifth title in six years, and their ninth overall.

The name "Subway Series" arose for a World Series played between two New York City teams. The series was punctuated by the Dodgers' Mickey Owen's dropped third strike of a sharply breaking curveball (a suspected spitball) pitched by Hugh Casey to Tommy Henrich in the 9th inning of Game 4. The play led to a Yankees rally and brought them one win away from another championship.

The Yankees were back after a one-year hiatus, having won thirteen (13) of their last fourteen (14) Series games and twenty-eight (28) of their last thirty-one (31) games in the World Series.

This was the first Subway Series between the Brooklyn Dodgers and New York Yankees, who had already faced the crosstown New York Giants five times, and the Series was now 1–0 in favor of the Bronx Bombers. These two teams would meet a total of seven (7) times from 1941 to 1956 – the Dodgers' only victory coming in 1955.

=== Game 1 ===
October 1, 1941, at Yankee Stadium in New York

Team	1	2	3	4	5	6	7	8	9	R	H	E
Brooklyn (N)	0	0	0	0	1	0	1	0	0	2	6	0
New York (A)	0	1	0	1	0	1	0	0	x	3	6	1
W: Red Ruffing (1–0) L: Curt Davis (0–1)
HR: NYY – Joe Gordon (1)

=== Game 2 ===
October 2, 1941, at Yankee Stadium in New York

Team	1	2	3	4	5	6	7	8	9	R	H	E
Brooklyn (N)	0	0	0	0	2	1	0	0	0	3	6	2
New York (A)	0	1	1	0	0	0	0	0	0	2	9	1
W: Whit Wyatt (1–0) L: Spud Chandler (0–1)

=== Game 3 ===
October 4, 1941, at Ebbets Field in Brooklyn, New York

Team	1	2	3	4	5	6	7	8	9	R	H	E
New York (A)	0	0	0	0	0	0	0	2	0	2	8	0
Brooklyn (N)	0	0	0	0	0	0	0	1	0	1	4	0
W: Marius Russo (1–0) L: Hugh Casey (0–1)

=== Game 4 ===
October 5, 1941, at Ebbets Field in Brooklyn, New York

Team	1	2	3	4	5	6	7	8	9	R	H	E
New York (A)	1	0	0	2	0	0	0	0	4	7	12	0
Brooklyn (N)	0	0	0	2	2	0	0	0	0	4	9	1
W: Johnny Murphy (1–0) L: Hugh Casey (0–2)
HR: : BRO – Pete Reiser (1)

=== Game 5 ===
October 6, 1941, at Ebbets Field in Brooklyn, New York

Team	1	2	3	4	5	6	7	8	9	R	H	E
New York (A)	0	2	0	0	1	0	0	0	0	3	6	0
Brooklyn (N)	0	0	1	0	0	0	0	0	0	1	4	1
W: Tiny Bonham (1–0) L: Whit Wyatt (1–1)
HR: : NYY – Tommy Henrich (1)

== Awards and honors ==
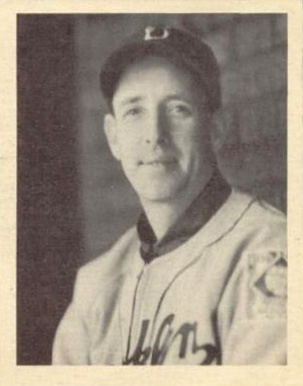
Whit Wyatt had a career season in 1941.

- 1941 Major League Baseball All-Star Game
  - Whit Wyatt starter
  - Mickey Owen starter
  - Pete Reiser starter
  - Dolph Camilli reserve
  - Billy Herman reserve
  - Cookie Lavagetto reserve
  - Joe Medwick reserve
- National League Most Valuable Player
  - Dolph Camilli
- TSN Major League All-Star Team
  - Whit Wyatt
  - Pete Reiser
  - Dolph Camilli
- TSN NL Most Valuable Player
  - Dolph Camilli

=== League top ten finishers ===
Dolph Camilli

- NL leader in home runs (34)
- NL leader in RBI (120)
- #2 in NL in slugging percentage (.556)
- #2 in NL in bases on balls (104)
- #3 in NL in on-base percentage (.407)

Hugh Casey

- #2 tied in NL in saves with Bill Crouch (7)

Kirby Higbe

- NL leader in wins (22)
- #4 in NL in strikeouts (121)

Joe Medwick

- #3 in NL in batting average (.318)
- #3 in NL in runs scored (100)

Pete Reiser

- NL leader in batting average (.343)
- NL leader in slugging percentage (.558)
- NL leader in runs scored (117)
- NL leader in triples (17)
- #4 in NL in on-base percentage (.406)

Whit Wyatt

- MLB leader in shutouts (7)
- NL leader in wins (22)
- #2 in NL in strikeouts (176)
- #2 in NL in ERA (2.34)
- #2 in NL in complete games (23)

== Farm system ==
Level	Team	League	Manager
AA	Montreal Royals	International League	Clyde Sukeforth
A1	Knoxville Smokies	Southern Association	Fred Lindstrom
B	Reading Brooks	Interstate League	Fresco Thompson
B	Durham Bulls	Piedmont League	Bruno Betzel
C	Santa Barbara Saints	California League	John Clancy
C	Quebec Athletics	Canadian–American League	Del Bissonette; Roland Gladu
C	Grand Rapids Colts	Michigan State League	Charles Lucas
C	Dayton Ducks	Middle Atlantic League	Paul Chervinko; Howard Holmes; William McWilliams
C	Troy Dodgers/Tuskegee Airmen	Alabama State League	Orace Powers
D	Elizabethton Betsy Red Sox	Appalachian League	Hobe Brummitt
D	Valdosta Trojans	Georgia–Florida League	Stew Hofferth
D	Newport Dodgers	Northeast Arkansas League	Merle Settlemire
D	Johnstown Johnnies	Pennsylvania State Association	George Treadwell
D	Olean Oilers	Pennsylvania–Ontario–New York League	Jake Pitler
D	Big Spring Bombers	West Texas–New Mexico League	Joe Tate

LEAGUE CHAMPIONS: Montreal, Durham, Santa Barbara, Elizebethton, Newport
