= Dale Jones (baseball) =

American baseball player (1918-1980)

- Pitcher
- Born: December 17, 1918; Marquette, Nebraska, U.S.
- Died: November 8, 1980 (aged 61); Orlando, Florida, U.S.
- Batted: Right Threw: Right

MLB debut
- September 7, 1941, for the Philadelphia Phillies

Last MLB appearance
- September 23, 1941, for the Philadelphia Phillies

MLB statistics
- Win–loss record: 0–1
- Earned run average: 7.56
- Strikeouts: 2
- Stats at Baseball Reference

Teams
- Philadelphia Phillies (1941)

Dale Eldon "Nubs" Jones (December 17, 1918 – November 8, 1980) was an American Major League Baseball (MLB) pitcher. Jones played in two games for the Philadelphia Phillies in 1941. His only decision occurred in an 8–6 loss to the New York Giants on September 23, 1941.

During World War II, Jones served in the United States Navy in the Pacific. He died on November 8, 1980, and is buried in Arlington National Cemetery.
