= 1941 New York Giants (MLB) season =

1941 New York Giants
- League: National League
- Ballpark: Polo Grounds
- City: New York City
- Record: 74–79 (.484)
- League place: 5th
- Owners: Horace Stoneham
- General managers: Bill Terry
- Managers: Bill Terry

The 1941 New York Giants season was the franchise's 59th season. The team finished in fifth place in the National League with a 74–79 record, 25½ games behind the Brooklyn Dodgers.

== Offseason ==
- December 4, 1940: Glen Stewart was purchased from the Giants by the Brooklyn Dodgers.
- Prior to 1941 season: Marv Grissom was signed as an amateur free agent by the Giants.

== Regular season ==
=== Season standings ===
National League
Team	W	L	Pct.	GB	Home	Road
Brooklyn Dodgers	100	54	.649	—	52‍–‍25	48‍–‍29
St. Louis Cardinals	97	56	.634	2½	53‍–‍24	44‍–‍32
Cincinnati Reds	88	66	.571	12	45‍–‍34	43‍–‍32
Pittsburgh Pirates	81	73	.526	19	45‍–‍32	36‍–‍41
New York Giants	74	79	.484	25½	38‍–‍39	36‍–‍40
Chicago Cubs	70	84	.455	30	38‍–‍39	32‍–‍45
Boston Braves	62	92	.403	38	32‍–‍44	30‍–‍48
Philadelphia Phillies	43	111	.279	57	23‍–‍52	20‍–‍59

=== Record vs. opponents ===
1941 National League record Sources:
Team	BSN	BRO	CHC	CIN	NYG	PHI	PIT	STL
Boston	—	4–18–2	11–11	9–13	6–16	14–8	10–12	8–14
Brooklyn	18–4–2	—	13–9	14–8	14–8	18–4	12–10	11–11–1
Chicago	11–11	9–13	—	8–14	9–13	14–8–1	9–13	10–12
Cincinnati	13–9	8–14	14–8	—	15–7	16–6	12–10	10–12
New York	16–6	8–14	13–9	7–15	—	16–6	8–14–2	6–15–1
Philadelphia	8–14	4–18	8–14–1	6–16	6–16	—	6–16	5–17
Pittsburgh	12–10	10–12	13–9	10–12	14–8–2	16–6	—	6–16
St. Louis	14–8	11–11–1	12–10	12–10	15–6–1	17–5	16–6	—

=== Roster ===
1941 New York Giants
Roster
Pitchers: 27 Ace Adams; 16 Bob Bowman; 20 Jumbo Brown; 28 Bob Carpenter; 21 Paul Dean; 36 Hugh East; 18 Harry Feldman; -- Rube Fischer; 10 Harry Gumbert; 18 Bump Hadley; 11 Carl Hubbell; 33 Dave Koslo; 12 Bill Lohrman; 21 Bill McGee; 15 Cliff Melton; 17 Hal Schumacher; 16 Tom Sunkel; 19 Johnnie Wittig	Catchers: 35 Rae Blaemire; 3 Harry Danning; 9 Gabby Hartnett; 8 Ken O'Dea; Infielders: 14 Dick Bartell; 29 Red Davis; 26 Odell Hale; 2 Billy Jurges; 34 Johnny McCarthy; 6 Joe Orengo; 7 Burgess Whitehead; 25 Mickey Witek; 5 Babe Young	Outfielders: 22 Morrie Arnovich; 23 Babe Barna; 24 Frank Demaree; 24 Sid Gordon; 23 Jo-Jo Moore; 4 Mel Ott; 1 Johnny Rucker; Other batters: 33 Jack Aragón	Manager: 30 Bill Terry; Coaches: 9 Gabby Hartnett; 31 Adolfo Luque; 32 Frank Snyder

== Player stats ==
= Indicates team leader

=== Batting ===
==== Starters by position ====
Note: Pos = Position; G = Games played; AB = At bats; H = Hits; Avg. = Batting average; HR = Home runs; RBI = Runs batted in

Pos	Player	G	AB	H	Avg.	HR	RBI
C	Harry Danning	130	459	112	.244	7	56
1B	Babe Young	152	574	152	.265	25	104
2B	Burgess Whitehead	116	403	92	.228	1	23
SS	Billy Jurges	134	471	138	.293	5	61
3B	Dick Bartell	104	373	113	.303	5	35
OF	Mel Ott	148	525	150	.286	27	90
OF	Jo-Jo Moore	121	428	117	.273	7	40
OF	Johnny Rucker	143	622	179	.288	1	42

==== Other batters ====
Note: G = Games played; AB = At bats; H = Hits; Avg. = Batting average; HR = Home runs; RBI = Runs batted in

Player	G	AB	H	Avg.	HR	RBI
Joe Orengo	77	252	54	.214	4	25
Morrie Arnovich	85	207	58	.280	2	22
Gabby Hartnett	46	150	45	.300	5	26
Odell Hale	41	102	20	.196	0	9
Mickey Witek	26	94	34	.362	1	16
Ken O'Dea	59	89	19	.213	3	17
John Davis	21	70	15	.214	0	5
Babe Barna	10	42	9	.214	1	5
Johnny McCarthy	14	40	13	.325	0	12
Frank Demaree	16	35	6	.171	0	1
Sid Gordon	9	31	8	.258	0	4
Rae Blaemire	2	5	2	.400	0	0
Jack Aragón	1	0	0	----	0	0

=== Pitching ===
= Indicates league leader

==== Starting pitchers ====
Note: G = Games pitched; IP = Innings pitched; W = Wins; L = Losses; ERA = Earned run average; SO = Strikeouts

Player	G	IP	W	L	ERA	SO
Hal Schumacher	30	206.0	12	10	3.36	63
Carl Hubbell	26	164.0	11	9	3.57	75
Harry Gumbert	5	32.1	1	1	4.45	9
Dave Koslo	4	23.2	1	2	1.90	12
Harry Feldman	3	20.1	1	1	3.98	9
Hugh East	2	15.2	1	1	3.45	4
Tom Sunkel	2	15.1	1	1	2.93	14

==== Other pitchers ====
Note: G = Games pitched; IP = Innings pitched; W = Wins; L = Losses; ERA = Earned run average; SO = Strikeouts

Player	G	IP	W	L	ERA	SO
Cliff Melton	42	194.1	8	11	3.01	100
Bill Lohrman	33	159.0	9	10	4.02	61
Bob Carpenter	29	131.2	11	6	3.83	42
Bill McGee	22	106.0	2	9	4.92	41
Johnnie Wittig	25	85.1	3	5	5.59	47
Bob Bowman	29	80.1	6	7	5.71	25
Bump Hadley	3	13.0	1	0	6.23	4
Rube Fischer	2	11.0	1	0	2.45	9

==== Relief pitchers ====
Note: G = Games pitched; W = Wins; L = Losses; SV = Saves; ERA = Earned run average; SO = Strikeouts

Player	G	W	L	SV	ERA	SO
Jumbo Brown	31	1	5	8	3.32	30
Ace Adams	38	4	1	1	4.82	18
Paul Dean	5	0	0	0	3.18	3

== Farm system ==
Level	Team	League	Manager
AA	Jersey City Giants	International League	Tony Cuccinello
AA	Hollywood Stars	Pacific Coast League	Bill Sweeney
B	Clinton Giants	Illinois–Indiana–Iowa League	Josh Billings
C	San Bernardino Stars	California League	Jack Rothrock
C	Fort Smith Giants	Western Association	Herschel Bobo
D	Milford Giants	Eastern Shore League	Hal Gruber
D	Salisbury Giants	North Carolina State League	Johnnie Heving

LEAGUE CHAMPIONS: Salisbury
San Bernardino franchise folded, June 29, 1941
