= Gene Lambert =

American baseball player (1921-2000)

- Pitcher
- Born: April 26, 1921; Crenshaw, Mississippi, U.S.
- Died: February 10, 2000 (aged 78); Germantown, Tennessee, U.S.
- Batted: Right Threw: Right

MLB debut
- September 14, 1941, for the Philadelphia Phillies

Last MLB appearance
- April 26, 1942, for the Philadelphia Phillies

MLB statistics
- Win–loss record: 0–1
- Earned run average: 2.70
- Strikeouts: 4
- Stats at Baseball Reference

Teams
- Philadelphia Phillies (1941–1942)

Eugene Marion Lambert (April 26, 1921 – February 10, 2000) was an American pitcher in Major League Baseball. He played for the Philadelphia Phillies.

Entering professional baseball in 1939, Lambert made his Major League debut on September 14, 1941. His only decision came 10 days later when the Phillies lost to the New York Giants, 2–0, at Shibe Park. He served in the United States Army during World War II from 1943 to 1945. Following his military service, he went back to baseball spending 1946 in the minor leagues.

Lambert died in Germantown, Tennessee, on February 10, 2000, aged 78.
