= Marquette, Nebraska =

- Village
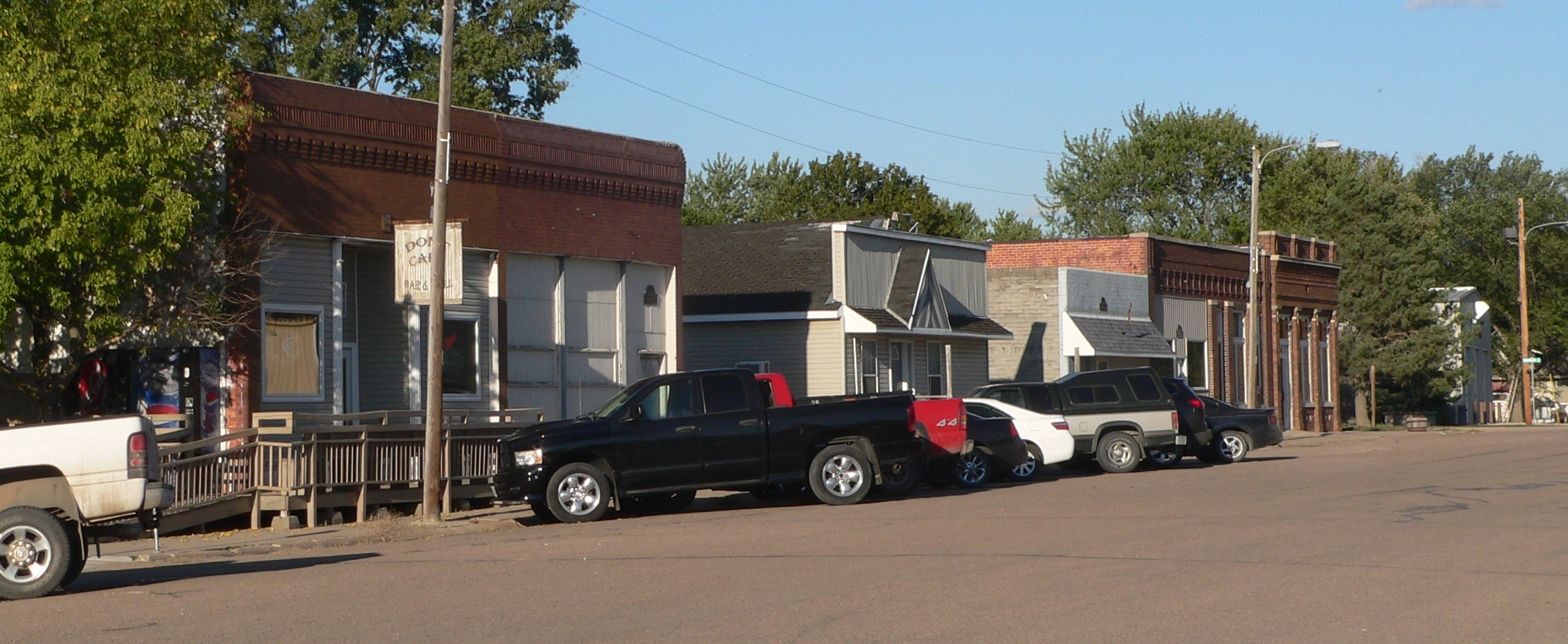
- Downtown Marquette

- Location of Marquette, Nebraska
- Coordinates: 41°00′23″N 98°00′35″W
- Country: United States
- State: Nebraska
- County: Hamilton

Area
  - Total: 0.21 sq mi (0.54 km^{2})
  - Land: 0.21 sq mi (0.54 km^{2})
  - Water: 0 sq mi (0.00 km^{2})
- Elevation: 1,821 ft (555 m)

Population (2020)
  - Total: 236
  - Density: 1,140/sq mi (440.1/km^{2})
- Time zone: UTC-6 (Central (CST))
  - Summer (DST): UTC-5 (CDT)
- ZIP code: 68854
- Area code: 402
- FIPS code: 31-30730
- GNIS feature ID: 2399261

Marquette is a village in Hamilton County, Nebraska, United States. As of the 2020 census, Marquette had a population of 236.

== History ==
Marquette was platted in 1882 when the Burlington and Missouri River Railroad was extended to that point. It was named for Thomas M. Marquette, a railroad official. Marquette was incorporated as a village in 1889.

== Geography ==
According to the United States Census Bureau, the village has a total area of 0.21 square miles (0.54 km^{2}), all land.

== Demographics ==
Historical population
Census	Pop.	Note	%±
1890	261		—
1900	210		−19.5%
1910	290		38.1%
1920	305		5.2%
1930	318		4.3%
1940	245		−23.0%
1950	218		−11.0%
1960	210		−3.7%
1970	239		13.8%
1980	303		26.8%
1990	211		−30.4%
2000	282		33.6%
2010	229		−18.8%
2020	236		3.1%
U.S. Decennial Census

=== 2010 census ===
As of the census of 2010, there were 229 people, 89 households, and 68 families residing in the village. The population density was 1,090.5 inhabitants per square mile (421.0/km^{2}). There were 104 housing units at an average density of 495.2 per square mile (191.2/km^{2}). The racial makeup of the village was 99.6% White and 0.4% from two or more races. Hispanic or Latino of any race were 2.6% of the population.

There were 89 households, of which 36.0% had children under the age of 18 living with them, 55.1% were married couples living together, 11.2% had a female householder with no husband present, 10.1% had a male householder with no wife present, and 23.6% were non-families. 18.0% of all households were made up of individuals, and 3.3% had someone living alone who was 65 years of age or older. The average household size was 2.57 and the average family size was 2.93.

The median age in the village was 41.3 years. 28.4% of residents were under the age of 18; 6.1% were between the ages of 18 and 24; 20.1% were from 25 to 44; 32.3% were from 45 to 64; and 13.1% were 65 years of age or older. The gender makeup of the village was 51.5% male and 48.5% female.

=== 2000 census ===
As of the census of 2000, there were 282 people, 106 households, and 83 families residing in the village. The population density was 1,368.5 inhabitants per square mile (528.4/km^{2}). There were 115 housing units at an average density of 558.1 per square mile (215.5/km^{2}). The racial makeup of the village was 98.94% White, 0.71% from other races, and 0.35% from two or more races. Hispanic or Latino of any race were 1.42% of the population.

There were 106 households, out of which 35.8% had children under the age of 18 living with them, 71.7% were married couples living together, 3.8% had a female householder with no husband present, and 20.8% were non-families. 18.9% of all households were made up of individuals, and 2.8% had someone living alone who was 65 years of age or older. The average household size was 2.66 and the average family size was 3.01.

In the village, the population was spread out, with 28.4% under the age of 18, 7.1% from 18 to 24, 28.4% from 25 to 44, 28.4% from 45 to 64, and 7.8% who were 65 years of age or older. The median age was 36 years. For every 100 females, there were 112.0 males. For every 100 females age 18 and over, there were 102.0 males.

As of 2000 the median income for a household in the village was $34,375, and the median income for a family was $36,786. Males had a median income of $26,250 versus $14,792 for females. The per capita income for the village was $16,272. None of the families and 3.5% of the population were living below the poverty line, including none of those under the age of 18 and 16.7% of those 65 and older.

== Notable people ==
- J. P. Guilford, psychologist
- Dale Jones, baseball player
