= Paul Masterson (baseball) =

American baseball player (1915-1997)

- Pitcher
- Born: October 16, 1915; Chicago, Illinois, U.S.
- Died: November 27, 1997 (aged 82); Chicago, Illinois, U.S.
- Batted: Left Threw: Left

MLB debut
- September 15, 1940, for the Philadelphia Phillies

Last MLB appearance
- May 3, 1942, for the Philadelphia Phillies

MLB statistics
- Win–loss record: 1–0
- Earned run average: 5.84
- Strikeouts: 14
- Stats at Baseball Reference

Teams
- Philadelphia Phillies (1940–1942)

Paul Nicholas "Lefty" Masterson (October 16, 1915 – November 27, 1997) was an American Major League Baseball pitcher. Masterson played for the Philadelphia Phillies from 1940 to 1942.

Masterson entered professional baseball in 1937 making his Major League debut with the Phillies on September 15, 1940. His only decision came on September 23, 1941, when the Phillies hosted the New York Giants at Shibe Park. Tossing a complete game, he earned the victory in the 8–2 final.

Masterson died in Chicago, the city of his birth, on November 27, 1997, aged 82.
