= Chip Marshall (baseball) =

American baseball player (1919–2007)

- Marshall with the Rochester Red Wings, c. 1946–1950
- Catcher
- Born: Charles Anthony Marchlewicz; August 28, 1919; Wilmington, Delaware, US
- Died: April 15, 2007 (aged 87); Wilmington, Delaware, US
- Batted: Right Threw: Right

MLB debut
- June 14, 1941, for the St. Louis Cardinals

Last MLB appearance
- June 14, 1941, for the St. Louis Cardinals

MLB statistics
- Games played: 1
- Plate appearances: 0
- Fielding average: 1.000
- Stats at Baseball Reference

Teams
- St. Louis Cardinals (1941)

Charles Anthony "Chip" Marshall (born Charles Anthony Marchlewicz; August 28, 1919 – April 15, 2007) was an American professional baseball catcher who appeared in a single game for the 1941 St. Louis Cardinals of Major League Baseball (MLB). Listed at 5 feet 10.5 inches (1.791 m) and 178 pounds (81 kg), he batted and threw right-handed.

== Biography ==
Marshall played in the minor leagues from 1937 to 1942 and from 1946 to 1952. He served in the United States Army from June 1943 through October 1945. In 13 minor league seasons, he appeared in 1057 games, compiling a .240 batting average with 38 home runs and at least 155 RBIs. While predominantly a catcher, he also played 46 games as a second baseman in 1942.

Marshall's lone major league appearance came with the St. Louis Cardinals on June 14, 1941, in a home game against Brooklyn Dodgers played at Sportsman's Park. With the Cardinals losing in the eighth inning, 12–5, Marshall entered the game as a pinch runner, replacing fellow catcher Gus Mancuso, who had just reached first base on a fielder's choice. Marshall did not advance, as the next two batters made outs, ending the inning. Marshall stayed in the game defensively for the top of the ninth inning, handling relief pitcher Ira Hutchinson. In an uneventful inning, Marshall made one putout, retiring batter Jimmy Wasdell. (Note: Years later, Marshall noted that it was a foul pop-up he caught in front of the Dodgers' dugout.) The Cardinals did not score in the bottom of the ninth, and Marshall did not have a plate appearance. As this was his only major league appearance, he holds a career 1.000 fielding average in MLB.

Born in Wilmington, Delaware, Marshall worked for the United States Postal Service after his professional baseball career, retiring in 1983. He was a coach for Babe Ruth League baseball for 18 years, (Note: Marshall stated that it was American Legion Baseball that he coached for 18 years.) and was a 1982 inductee of the Delaware Sports Hall of Fame. Marshall was married and had one daughter. He died in his home city in 2007, aged 87, and was interred there.
