= Bill Brandt (baseball) =

American baseball player (1915–1968)

- Pitcher
- Born: March 21, 1915; Aurora, Indiana, U.S.
- Died: May 16, 1968 (aged 53); Fort Wayne, Indiana, U.S.
- Batted: Right Threw: Right

MLB debut
- September 20, 1941, for the Pittsburgh Pirates

Last MLB appearance
- October 3, 1943, for the Pittsburgh Pirates

MLB statistics
- Win–loss record: 5–3
- Earned run average: 3.57
- Strikeouts: 21
- Stats at Baseball Reference

Teams
- Pittsburgh Pirates (1941–1943)

William George Brandt (March 21, 1915 – May 16, 1968) was a professional baseball player. He was a right-handed pitcher over parts of three seasons (1941–43) with the Pittsburgh Pirates. For his career, he compiled a 5–3 record, with a 3.57 earned run average, and 21 strikeouts in 80 2/3 innings pitched.

From 1944 to 1945, Brandt served in the United States Navy during World War II. While in the Navy, he played for the Great Lakes Naval Training Station Bluejackets in 1944.
