= Frank LaManna =

American baseball player (1919-1980)

- Pitcher
- Born: August 22, 1919; Homer City, Pennsylvania, U.S.
- Died: September 1, 1980 (aged 61); Syracuse, New York, U.S.
- Batted: Right Threw: Right

MLB debut
- April 16, 1940, for the Boston Braves

Last MLB appearance
- September 19, 1942, for the Boston Braves

MLB statistics
- Win–loss record: 6–5
- Earned run average: 5.24
- Strikeouts: 28
- Stats at Baseball Reference

Teams
- Boston Bees / Braves (1940–1942)

Frank LaManna (August 22, 1919 – September 1, 1980) was an American professional baseball player who pitched in the Major Leagues from 1940 to 1942 for the Boston Bees / Braves.

LaManna entered professional baseball in 1938 before his MLB callup in 1940. While in the majors, he was also an outfielder in addition to pitching. He was out of baseball from 1943–45 when he served in the United States Army Air Forces during World War II. Following the war, he returned to baseball playing from 1946–53.

Born in Homer City, Pennsylvania, LaManna died in Syracuse, New York, on September 1, 1980, aged 61.
