= Paul Busby =

American baseball player (1918–2003)

- Outfielder
- Born: August 25, 1918; Waynesboro, Mississippi, U.S.
- Died: December 5, 2003 (aged 85); Meridian, Mississippi, U.S.
- Batted: Left Threw: Right

MLB debut
- September 14, 1941, for the Philadelphia Phillies

Last MLB appearance
- July 1, 1943, for the Philadelphia Phillies

MLB statistics
- Batting average: .268
- Home runs: 0
- Runs batted in: 7
- Stats at Baseball Reference

Teams
- Philadelphia Phillies (1941, 1943)

Paul Miller Busby (August 25, 1918 – December 5, 2003), nicknamed "Red", was an American Major League Baseball outfielder who played for the Philadelphia Phillies (1941 and 1943). He was born in Waynesboro, Mississippi.

Busby made his major league debut on September 14, 1941, in a road game against the Pittsburgh Pirates at Forbes Field. His last appearance (July 1, 1943) was in a home doubleheader against the Pirates at Shibe Park.

Busby appeared in the outfield 13 times in his 36 games. While in the field he recorded 28 putouts without making an error. He went 15-for-56 at the plate (.268) with 7 RBI and 16 runs scored.
