= Cy Blanton =

American baseball player (1908–1945)

- Pitcher
- Born: July 6, 1908; Waurika, Oklahoma, U.S.
- Died: September 13, 1945 (aged 37); Norman, Oklahoma, U.S.
- Batted: Left Threw: Right

MLB debut
- September 23, 1934, for the Pittsburgh Pirates

Last MLB appearance
- May 6, 1942, for the Philadelphia Phillies

MLB statistics
- Win–loss record: 68–71
- Earned run average: 3.55
- Strikeouts: 611
- Stats at Baseball Reference

Teams
- Pittsburgh Pirates (1934–1939); Philadelphia Phillies (1940–1942)

Career highlights and awards
- 2× All Star (1937, 1941); NL ERA leader (1935)

Darrell Elijah "Cy" Blanton (July 6, 1908 – September 13, 1945) was an American starting pitcher in Major League Baseball who played for the Pittsburgh Pirates and Philadelphia Phillies. Blanton batted left-handed and threw right-handed. Blanton was a screwball pitcher.

== Pitching career ==
Blanton grew up in Trousdale, Oklahoma, and was living in Shawnee, Oklahoma, playing on sandlot teams. In 1929 he joined the Shawnee Robins, a C Class team in the Western Association. Blanton was a pitcher for the Independence Producers in 1931. The Independence Producers were a Class C minor league team located in Independence, Kansas. Blanton had twelve wins and eight losses for the season.

Blanton was one of the mainstays of the Pittsburgh Pirates rotation in the mid-1930s. He pitched for the Albany Senators in 1934, being promoted to Pittsburgh to pitch one game. Earlier he pitched in the Piedmont League and the Western Association.

In his 1935 rookie season he recorded 18 wins with 142 strikeouts and led the National League in earned run average (2.58) and shutouts (4). He averaged 12.67 wins for the next three years, leading again the league in shutouts in 1936 (4) and starts in 1937 (34). A free agent before the 1940 season, he signed with the Philadelphia Phillies. Although he made the National League All-Star team in 1937 and 1941, he never showed again the brilliance of his first season. He last pitched for the Phillies in 1942, being released after a month long stay in hospital due to kidney problems.

In a nine-season career, Blanton posted a 68–71 record with a 3.55 ERA and 611 strikeouts.

== Death ==
He was suspended by the Hollywood Stars for failure to get in shape in March 1945. He returned to Oklahoma from California where he had been living just before he died. Blanton died in Norman, Oklahoma, at the age of 37, from internal hemorrhaging as a result of cirrhosis. His body was taken to Shawnee, Oklahoma, for burial in the nearby Tecumseh Cemetery. He left a wife, Marie, and four children including a son, Zane, who briefly played in the minor leagues with the Chicago Cubs and Philadelphia Phillies.

== See also ==
- List of Major League Baseball annual ERA leaders
