= Ike Pearson =

American baseball player (1917–1985)

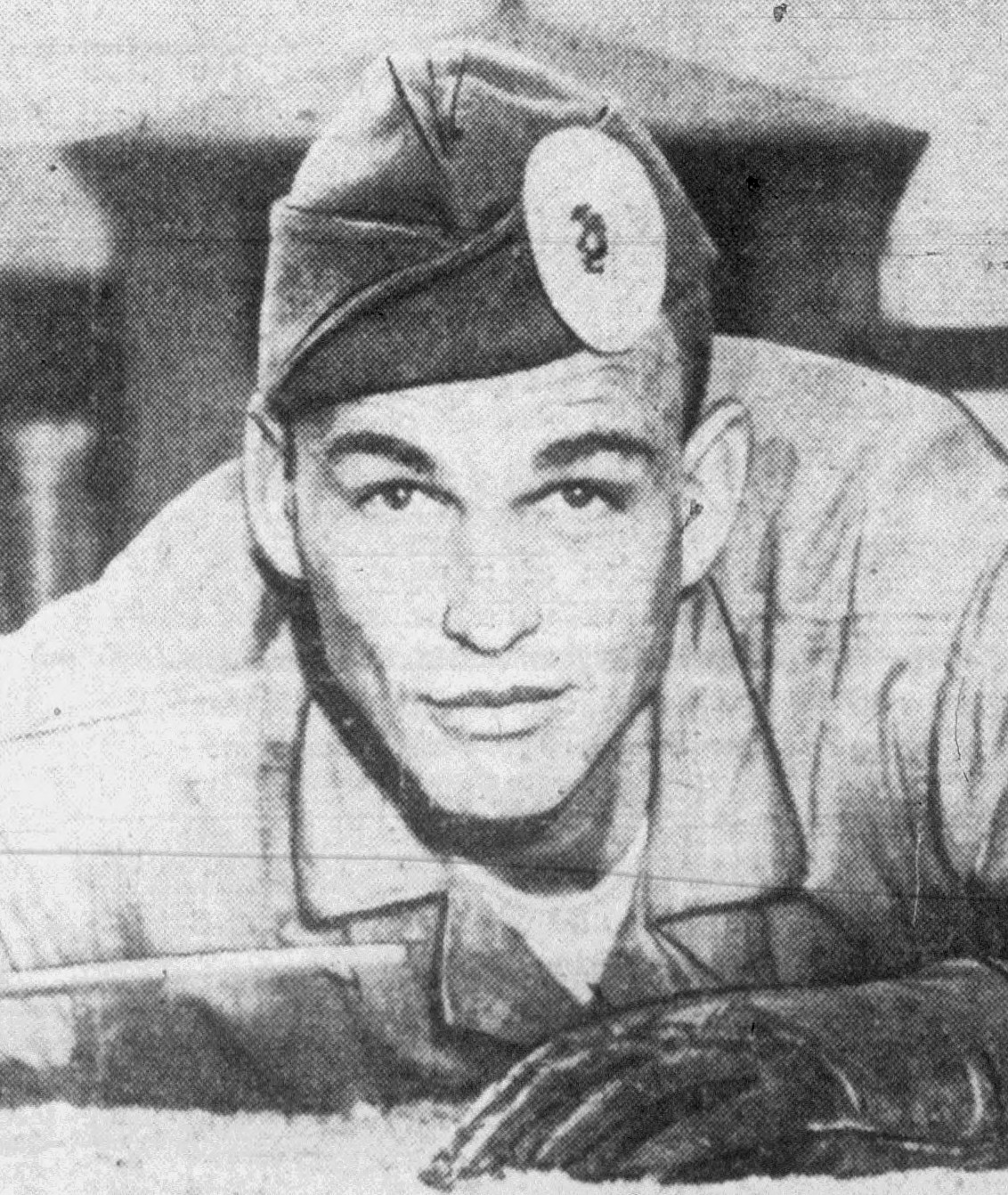
- Pearson, circa 1943
- Pitcher
- Born: March 1, 1917; Grenada, Mississippi, U.S.
- Died: March 17, 1985 (aged 68); Sarasota, Florida, U.S.
- Batted: Right Threw: Right

MLB debut
- June 6, 1939, for the Philadelphia Phillies

Last MLB appearance
- September 19, 1948, for the Chicago White Sox

MLB statistics
- Win–loss record: 13–50
- Earned run average: 4.83
- Strikeouts: 149
- Stats at Baseball Reference

Teams
- Philadelphia Phillies (1939–1942, 1946); Chicago White Sox (1948)

Isaac Overton Pearson (March 1, 1917 – March 17, 1985) was an American professional baseball pitcher who appeared in 164 games in the Major Leagues for the Philadelphia Phillies (1939–1942; 1946) and Chicago White Sox (1948). The native of Grenada, Mississippi, a right-hander, stood 6 feet 1 inch (1.85 m) tall and weighed 180 pounds (82 kg). He signed with the Phillies off the campus of the University of Mississippi, and was a World War II veteran of the United States Marine Corps.

Pearson compiled a lowly .206 winning percentage during his Major League career, but he pitched for some of the worst teams of his era. His Phillies clubs lost 106 (1939), 103 (1940), 111 (1941), and 109 (1942) games, and his White Sox team dropped 101 games (1948). He did appear in five games for the 1946 Phillies, who lost only 85 of 154 games that season. He is also known for having severely beaned star Brooklyn Dodgers outfielder Pete Reiser on April 23, 1941 — one of a series of injuries that derailed Reiser's promising career. Pearson led the National League in hit batsmen that season.

Pearson, a swingman who served as both a starting pitcher and a reliever, also led the NL in games finished that year, and compiled six saves, fourth in the league. All told he surrendered 611 hits and 268 bases on balls in 559 MLB innings pitched, with 149 strikeouts.

Pearson was buried at the Memphis National Cemetery.
