= Hersh Lyons =

American baseball player (1915–2008)

- Pitcher
- Born: July 23, 1915; Fresno, California
- Died: April 8, 2008 (aged 92); Inglewood, California
- Batted: Right Threw: Right

MLB debut
- April 17, 1941, for the St. Louis Cardinals

Last MLB appearance
- April 17, 1941, for the St. Louis Cardinals

MLB statistics
- Win–loss record: 0–0
- Earned run average: 0.00
- Strikeouts: 1
- Stats at Baseball Reference

Teams
- St. Louis Cardinals (1941)

Herschel Englebert Lyons (July 23, 1915 – April 8, 2008) was an American right-handed pitcher in Major League Baseball who played one game for the St. Louis Cardinals in 1941.

Lyons was born in Fresno, California, and attended Occidental College. Listed at 5 ft 11 in (1.80 m), 195 lb (88 kg), he batted and threw right-handed.

Lyons played his only major league game with the Cardinals on April 17, 1941, as a reliever in a game against the Cincinnati Reds at Crosley Field. He allowed one hit, gave three walks while striking out one over 1 1/3 innings, and never appeared in a Major League game again. He did not have a decision and posted a perfect 0.00 earned run average.

Lyons was one of only three National League pitchers to steal a base in the 1941 season.

Lyons served in the Army Air Forces during World War II, with service in Italy and Africa. He later served as an elementary school principal in the Los Angeles Unified School District for over 25 years.

Lyons died in Inglewood, California, at the age of 92. He was interred at Inglewood Park Cemetery.

== See also ==
- St. Louis Cardinals all-time roster
