= Rae Blaemire =

American baseball player (1911–1975)

- Catcher
- Born: February 8, 1911; Gary, Indiana, U.S.
- Died: December 23, 1975 (aged 64); Champaign, Illinois, U.S.
- Batted: Right Threw: Right

MLB debut
- September 13, 1941, for the New York Giants

Last MLB appearance
- September 23, 1941, for the New York Giants

MLB statistics
- Batting average: .400
- Hits: 2
- Runs scored: 0
- Stats at Baseball Reference

Teams
- New York Giants (1941)

Rae Bertrum Blaemire (February 8, 1911 – December 23, 1975) was an American Major League Baseball player. He played in two games for the New York Giants during the 1941 baseball season. He later managed the Grand Forks Chiefs of the Northern League during the 1946 season.
