= Frank Jelincich =

American baseball player (1917–1992)

- Outfielder
- Born: September 3, 1917; San Jose, California, U.S.
- Died: June 27, 1992 (aged 74); Rochester, Minnesota, U.S.
- Batted: Right Threw: Right

MLB debut
- September 6, 1941, for the Chicago Cubs

Last MLB appearance
- September 25, 1941, for the Chicago Cubs

MLB statistics
- Games played: 4
- At bats: 8
- Hits: 1
- Stats at Baseball Reference

Teams
- Chicago Cubs (1941)

Frank Anthony "Jelly" Jelincich (September 3, 1917 – June 27, 1992) was an American outfielder in Major League Baseball. He played for the Chicago Cubs in 1941.
