= Johnny Podgajny =

American baseball player (1920–1971)

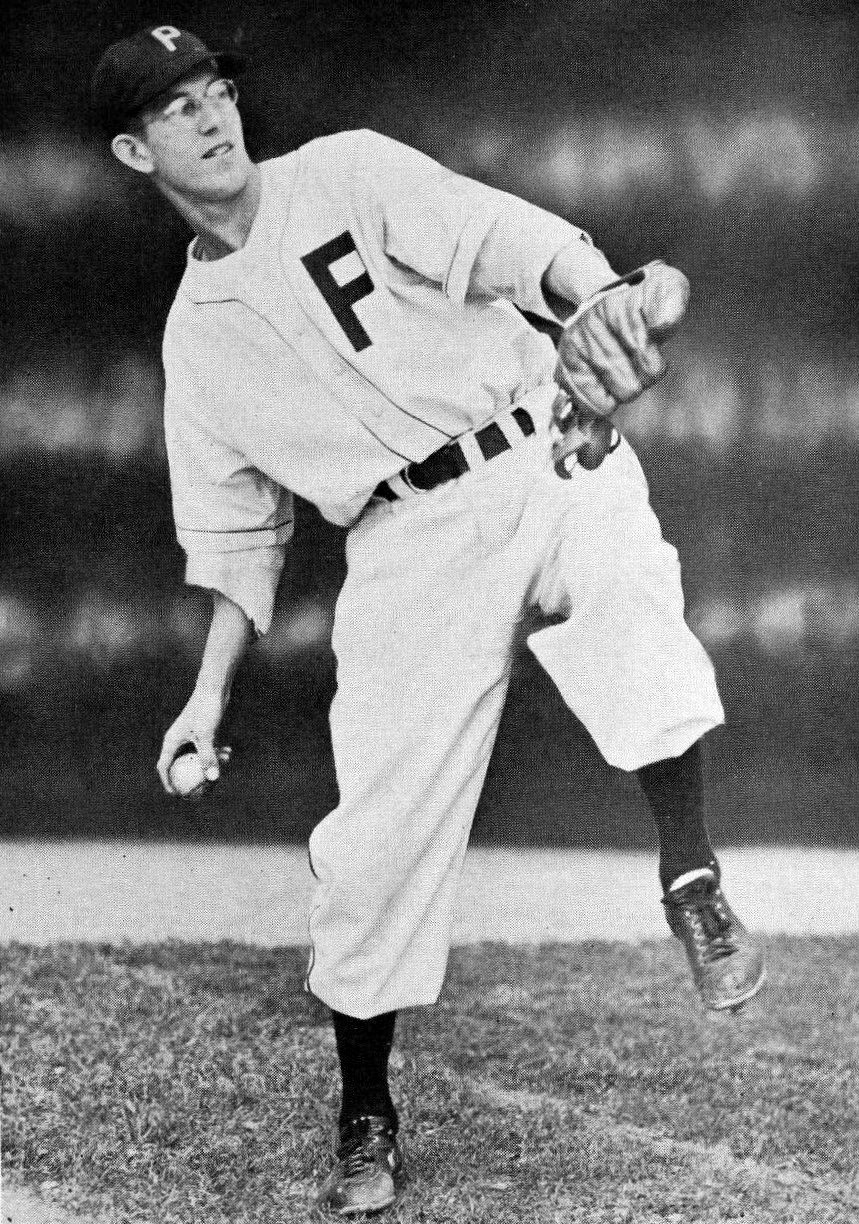
- Pitcher
- Born: June 10, 1920; Chester, Pennsylvania, U.S.
- Died: March 2, 1971 (aged 50); Chester, Pennsylvania, U.S.
- Batted: Right Threw: Right

MLB debut
- September 15, 1940, for the Philadelphia Phillies

Last MLB appearance
- May 13, 1946, for the Cleveland Indians

MLB statistics
- Win–loss record: 20–37
- Earned run average: 4.20
- Strikeouts: 129
- Stats at Baseball Reference

Teams
- Philadelphia Phillies (1940–1943); Pittsburgh Pirates (1943); Cleveland Indians (1946)

John Sigmund Podgajny (June 10, 1920 – March 2, 1971) was a Major League Baseball pitcher who played for five seasons. He played for the Philadelphia Phillies from 1940 to 1943, the Pittsburgh Pirates in 1943 and the Cleveland Indians in 1946.

He died on March 2, 1971, in Chester, Pennsylvania, and was interred at Saint Francis DeSales Cemetery in Lenni, Pennsylvania.
