= Jake Mooty =

American baseball player (1912–1970)

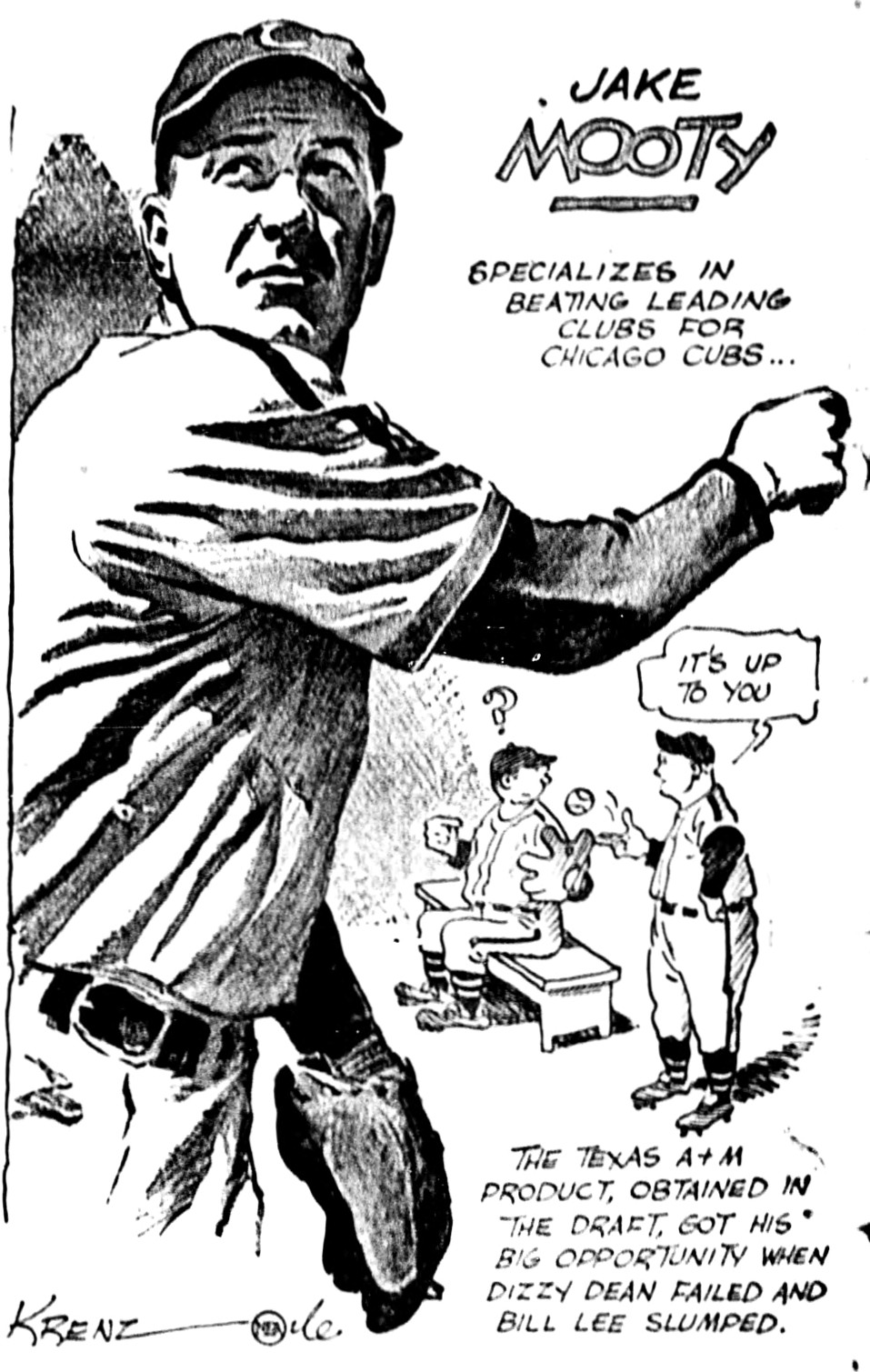
- A sketch of Mooty by Art Krenz in 1940
- Pitcher
- Born: April 13, 1912; Bennett, Texas, U.S.
- Died: April 20, 1970 (aged 58); Fort Worth, Texas, U.S.
- Batted: Right Threw: Right

MLB debut
- September 9, 1936, for the Cincinnati Reds

Last MLB appearance
- September 29, 1944, for the Detroit Tigers

MLB statistics
- Win–loss record: 16–23
- Earned run average: 4.03
- Strikeouts: 145
- Stats at Baseball Reference

Teams
- Cincinnati Reds (1936–1937); Chicago Cubs (1940–1943); Detroit Tigers (1944)

Jake T. Mooty (Note: According to The Cultural Encyclopedia of Baseball, Mooty's "real name" is JT Mooty.) (April 13, 1912 – April 20, 1970) was an American Major League Baseball pitcher with the Cincinnati Reds, Chicago Cubs and the Detroit Tigers between 1936 and 1944. He batted and threw right-handed. Mooty attended Texas A&M University from 1933 to 1935.
