= Hugh East =

American baseball player (1919-1981)

- Pitcher
- Born: July 7, 1919; Birmingham, Alabama
- Died: November 2, 1981 (aged 62); Charleston, South Carolina
- Batted: Right Threw: Right

MLB debut
- September 13, 1941, for the New York Giants

Last MLB appearance
- October 3, 1943, for the New York Giants

MLB statistics
- Win–loss record: 2–6
- Earned run average: 5.40
- Strikeouts: 27
- Stats at Baseball Reference

Teams
- New York Giants (1941–1943)

Gordon Hugh East (July 7, 1919 – November 2, 1981) was a pitcher in Major League Baseball. He played for the New York Giants. From 1943 to 1945 East served in the Navy during World War II.
