= Boom-Boom Beck =

American baseball player (1904–1987)

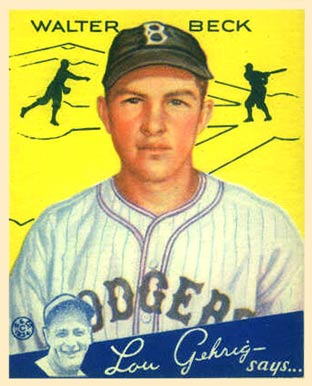
- Pitcher
- Born: October 16, 1904; Decatur, Illinois, U.S.
- Died: May 7, 1987 (aged 82); Champaign, Illinois, U.S.
- Batted: Right Threw: Right

MLB debut
- September 22, 1924, for the St. Louis Browns

Last MLB appearance
- September 26, 1945, for the Pittsburgh Pirates

MLB statistics
- Win–loss record: 38–69
- Earned run average: 4.30
- Strikeouts: 352
- Stats at Baseball Reference

Teams
- St. Louis Browns (1924, 1927–1928); Brooklyn Dodgers (1933–1934); Philadelphia Phillies/Phils (1939–1943); Detroit Tigers (1944); Cincinnati Reds (1945); Pittsburgh Pirates (1945)

Walter William "Boom-Boom" Beck (October 16, 1904 – May 7, 1987) was an American right-handed pitcher in Major League Baseball. He played 12 seasons in the Major Leagues with the St. Louis Browns, Brooklyn Dodgers, Philadelphia Phillies, Detroit Tigers, Cincinnati Reds, and Pittsburgh Pirates.

Beck was one of three pitchers to lead the National League in games started (35) in 1933. In 265 career games, Beck had a 38–69 won–loss total with 100 games started and 94 games finished in 1,034 innings pitched.

His nickname, Boom-Boom, was earned while pitching at Baker Bowl against the Phillies in 1934. He allowed numerous line drives that struck the metal outfield wall, each time making a booming sound. Manager Casey Stengel sought to remove Beck from the game. Frustrated with his performance and for being removed, Beck threw the baseball at the outfield wall, where it hit and made another booming sound. Outfielder Hack Wilson had not been paying attention; hearing the ball hit the fence and thinking that gameplay had resumed, Wilson hurriedly chased the ball down and threw it back to the infield.

Beck became a pitching coach after his playing career ended, serving in that role with the Washington Senators from 1957 to 1959. He also worked as a minor league pitching instructor for the Milwaukee Braves in 1960–61.
