= Jim Carlin (baseball) =

American baseball player (1918-2003)

- Outfielder
- Born: February 23, 1918; Wylam, Alabama, U.S.
- Died: November 29, 2003 (aged 85); Birmingham, Alabama, U.S.
- Batted: Right Threw: Right

MLB debut
- July 26, 1941, for the Philadelphia Phillies

Last MLB appearance
- August 22, 1941, for the Philadelphia Phillies

MLB statistics
- Batting average: .143
- Hits: 3
- Runs batted in: 2
- Stats at Baseball Reference

Teams
- Philadelphia Phillies (1941)

James Arthur Carlin (February 23, 1918 – November 29, 2003, in Birmingham, Alabama) was an American Major League Baseball outfielder. He attended college at Southeastern Louisiana University, then played 16 games in 1941 with the Philadelphia Phillies, making 3 hits in 21 at-bats, including a home run. He served in the military during World War II.
