= Bob Carpenter (baseball) =

American baseball player (1917–2005)

- Pitcher
- Born: December 12, 1917; Chicago, Illinois, U.S.
- Died: October 19, 2005 (aged 87); Evergreen Park, Illinois, U.S.
- Batted: Right Threw: Right

MLB debut
- September 5, 1940, for the New York Giants

Last MLB appearance
- August 13, 1947, for the Chicago Cubs

MLB statistics
- Win–loss record: 25–20
- Earned run average: 3.60
- Strikeouts: 134
- Stats at Baseball Reference

Teams
- New York Giants (1940–1942, 1946–1947); Chicago Cubs (1947)

Robert Louis Carpenter (December 12, 1917 – October 19, 2005), was an American professional baseball pitcher who appeared in 80 games in Major League Baseball (MLB) between 1940 and 1942, and again from 1946 to 1947, with the New York Giants and Chicago Cubs. Born in Chicago, he stood 6 feet 3 inches (1.91 m) tall, weighed 195 pounds (88 kg), and batted and threw right-handed.

Carpenter entered baseball in 1936 at age 18 in the Class C Cotton States League. In his fifth pro season, he was called up to the Giants in September 1940. His maiden appearance came as the starting pitcher against the Boston Bees at the Polo Grounds on September 5; he lasted six innings and allowed three earned runs without earning a decision. Then, over two weeks later on September 22, Carpenter was given his second MLB starting assignment, also against Boston. This time, he earned a complete game, 7–3 victory at the "Beehive", allowing nine hits and striking out four. Four days later, he was even more effective, shutting down the last-place Philadelphia Phillies 2–1 on six hits in another complete game for his second big-league triumph.

Carpenter appeared in 57 games for the 1941–1942 Giants, 44 of them starts, and won 11 games each season. He threw 20 complete games and three shutouts, and he earned two saves coming out of the New York bullpen. He then missed three consecutive baseball campaigns during his service in the United States Army during World War II. When he returned to baseball in 1946, he was ineffective, apart from a four-hit shutout against the Boston Braves on May 26. He worked in only 12 games, and only one contest after June 28. He won only one of four decisions, with a mediocre 4.85 earned run average.

Then, in 1947, the Giants released him May 12 after two poor outings. He was given a second chance by the Cubs on July 25. The following day at Wrigley Field, he gained a measure of revenge against the Giants, retiring all six men he faced in a relief assignment, but he worked in only three more games through August 13 in what would be his final season in baseball.

In his 80 games pitched, Carpenter posted a 25–20 record and 3.60 earned run average. In 54 starts, he threw 23 complete games and four shutouts. He allowed 411 hits and 132 bases on balls, with 134 strikeouts, in 3992/3 innings of work. Twenty-four of his 25 victories came before his wartime service.

Bob Carpenter died at age 88 in Evergreen Park, Illinois.
