= Bill Crouch (1940s pitcher) =

American baseball player (1907–1980)

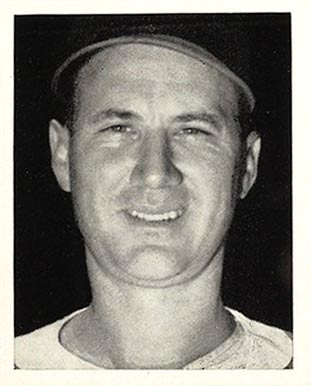
- Pitcher
- Born: August 20, 1907; Wilmington, Delaware, U.S.
- Died: December 26, 1980 (aged 73); Howell, Michigan, U.S.
- Batted: Switch Threw: Right

MLB debut
- May 9, 1939, for the Brooklyn Dodgers

Last MLB appearance
- September 11, 1945, for the St. Louis Cardinals

MLB statistics
- Win–loss record: 8–5
- Earned run average: 3.47
- Strikeouts: 55
- Stats at Baseball Reference

Teams
- Brooklyn Dodgers (1939); Philadelphia Phillies (1941); St. Louis Cardinals (1941, 1945)

William Elmer Crouch (August 20, 1907 – December 26, 1980) was an American Major League Baseball pitcher who played for the Brooklyn Dodgers (1939), Philadelphia Phillies (1941), and St. Louis Cardinals (1941 and 1945). The 6 ft 1 in (1.85 m), 180 lb (82 kg) right-hander was a native of Wilmington, Delaware.

Crouch was 4–0 with a 2.58 during his brief rookie season. He made his major league debut in relief on May 9, 1939, against the Cardinals at Ebbets Field. His first major league win came in his first start, a complete game 11–2 victory over the Phillies in the first game of a home doubleheader on September 8, 1939.

In 1941 Crouch finished in the National League top ten for games pitched (38), saves (7), and games finished (16).

Career totals for 50 games pitched include an 8–5 record, 12 starts, 4 complete games, 21 games finished, and 7 saves. Crouch allowed only 10 home runs and 60 earned runs in 155 2/3 innings pitched. His lifetime ERA stands at 3.47. He handled 40 out of 41 total chances for a .976 fielding percentage.

== Family ==
Crouch was the son of former major league pitcher William "Bill" Crouch. They are the only father/son duo from Delaware to have played in the big leagues.

== See also ==
- List of second-generation Major League Baseball players
