= Howie Krist =

American baseball player (1916–1989)

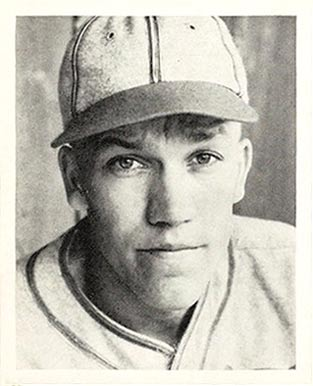
- Pitcher
- Born: February 28, 1916; West Henrietta, New York, U.S.
- Died: April 23, 1989 (aged 73); Buffalo, New York, U.S.
- Batted: Left Threw: Right

MLB debut
- September 12, 1937, for the St. Louis Cardinals

Last MLB appearance
- September 7, 1946, for the St. Louis Cardinals

MLB statistics
- Win–loss record: 37–11
- Earned run average: 3.32
- Strikeouts: 150
- Stats at Baseball Reference

Teams
- St. Louis Cardinals (1937–1938, 1941–1943, 1946)

Career highlights and awards
- 2× World Series champion (1942, 1946)

Howard Wilbur Krist (February 28, 1916 – April 23, 1989) was an American pitcher who played Major League Baseball from 1937 to 1946.

He was nicknamed “Howie” by his family and "Spud" during his baseball career, the latter in reference to his childhood years hurling potatoes at the barn for practice with his brothers on their family’s western New York State potato farm.

Krist played his entire MLB career for the St. Louis Cardinals of the National League, and was a member of their 1942 and 1946 World Series Championship teams.

His 10–0 record in 1941, his first full season, is the third-best undefeated season ever. He suffered numerous illnesses and injuries that affected his overall career, including influenza, a broken ankle, a broken back in a car accident, and a bullet wound while serving in the United States Army for two years in Europe during World War II.

Krist died at a hospital in Buffalo, New York on April 23, 1989.
