= List of Pittsburgh Pirates Opening Day starting pitchers =

The Pittsburgh Pirates are a Major League Baseball (MLB) franchise based in Pittsburgh, Pennsylvania. They play in the National League Central division. Originally known as the Alleghenys, they played in the American Association from 1882 through 1886, and have played in the National League since 1887. The first game of the new baseball season for a team is played on Opening Day, and being named the Opening Day starter is an honor, which is often given to the player who is expected to lead the pitching staff that season, though there are various strategic reasons why a team's best pitcher might not start on Opening Day. The Pirates have used 71 Opening Day starting pitchers since they began to play as a Major League team in 1882. The Pirates have a record of 69 wins and 60 losses in their Opening Day games.

The Pirates have played in several different home ball parks. Between 1882 and 1909 they played in two parks called Exposition Park and in Recreation Park. They played in Forbes Field from 1909 to 1970 and Three Rivers Stadium from 1970 to 2000 and they have played in their current stadium, PNC Park, since 2001. They had a record of no wins and one loss in the first Exposition Park, four wins and no losses in Recreation Park and no wins and two losses in the second Exposition Park. They had a record of four wins and two losses at Forbes Field and a record of five wins and eight losses at Three Rivers Stadium. Through 2010, they have a record of two wins and one loss at PNC Park. That gives the Pirates an overall Opening Day record of 15 wins and 14 losses at home. They have a record of 54 wins and 46 losses in Opening Day games on the road.

Bob Friend has made the most Opening Day starts for the Pirates, with seven. Babe Adams and Frank Killen each made five Opening Day starts for the Pirates, and Deacon Phillippe, Howie Camnitz, Cy Blanton and Bob Veale each made four Opening Day starts. Ed Morris, Pud Galvin, Wilbur Cooper, Ray Kremer, Rip Sewell, Steve Blass, Dock Ellis, Rick Rhoden, Doug Drabek and Francisco Liriano all made three Opening Day starts for the Pirates. Several Pittsburgh Pirates Opening Day starting pitchers have been elected to the Baseball Hall of Fame, including Galvin, Burleigh Grimes, Waite Hoyt, Jim Bunning, and Bert Blyleven. Bunning was elected as both a United States congressman and senator from Kentucky after retiring from baseball.

The Pirates have won nine National League titles, in 1901, 1902, 1903, 1909, 1925, 1927, 1960, 1971 and 1979. They went on to win the World Series in 1909, 1925, 1960, 1971 and 1979 (the modern World Series began in 1903). Sam Leever was the Pirates Opening Day starting pitcher in 1901, Phillippe was the Opening Day starting pitcher in both 1902 and 1903, Camnitz was the Opening Day starting pitcher in 1909, Emil Yde in 1925, Kremer in 1927, Friend in 1960, Ellis in 1971 and Blyleven in 1979.

== Key ==
Season	Each year is linked to an article about that particular Pirates season.
Pitcher (#)	Number of appearances as Opening Day starter with the Pirates
W	Win
L	Loss
T	Tie
ND (W)	No decision by starting pitcher; Pirates won game
ND (L)	No decision by starting pitcher; Pirates lost game
(W)	Pirates won game; no information on starting pitcher's decision
(L)	Pirates lost game; no information on starting pitcher's decision
*	Advanced to the post-season
**	NL Champions
⁂	World Series Champions

== Pitchers ==
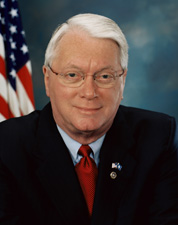
U.S. Senator Jim Bunning was the Pirates' Opening Day starting pitcher in 1968.

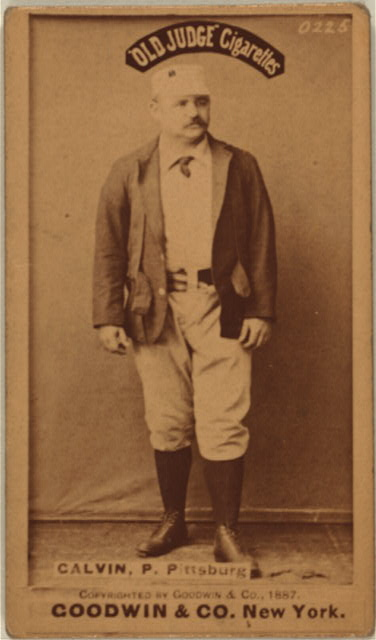
Hall of Famer Pud Galvin made three Opening Day starts for the Pirates.

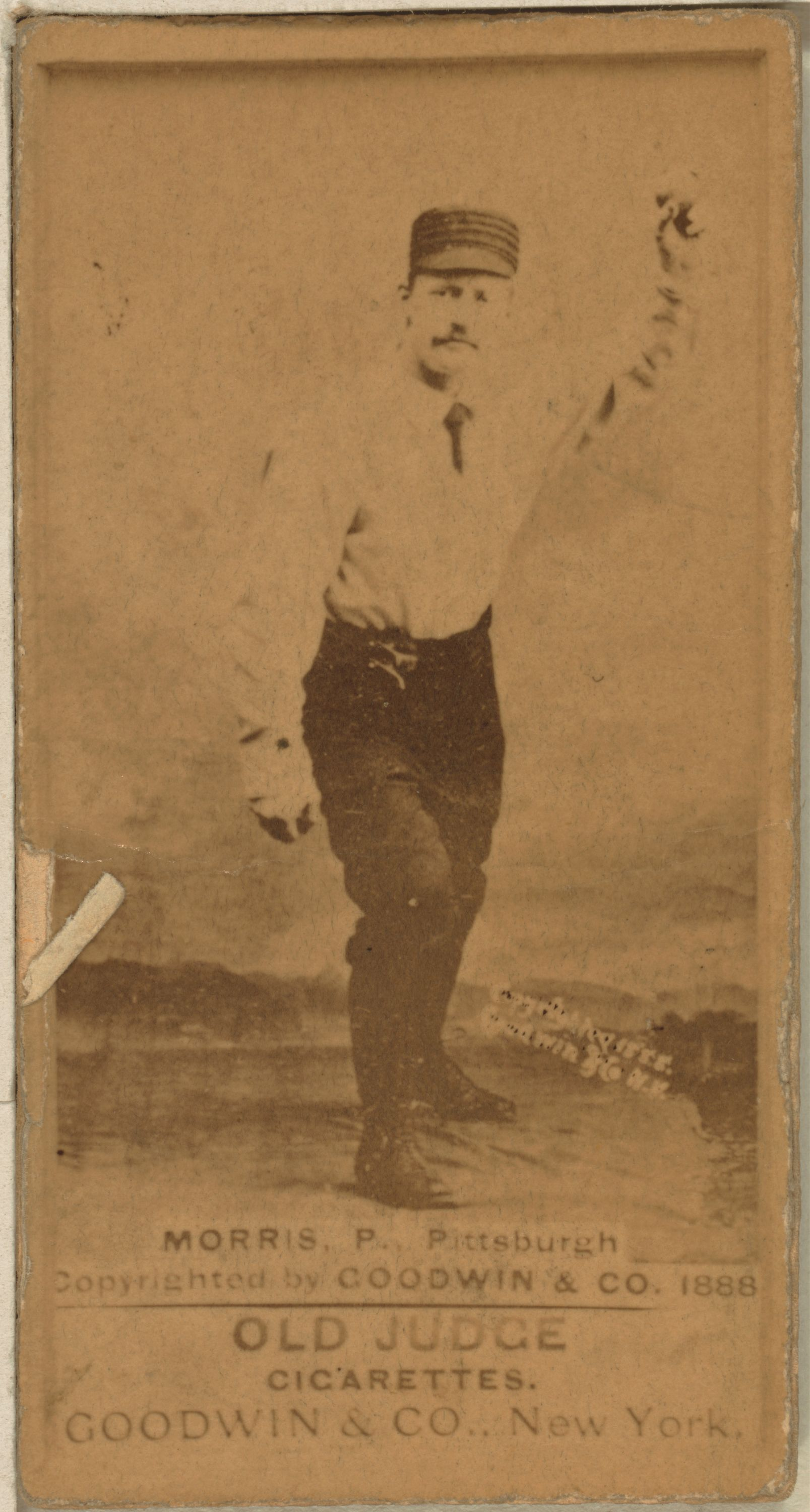
Ed Morris made three Opening Day starts for the Pirates.

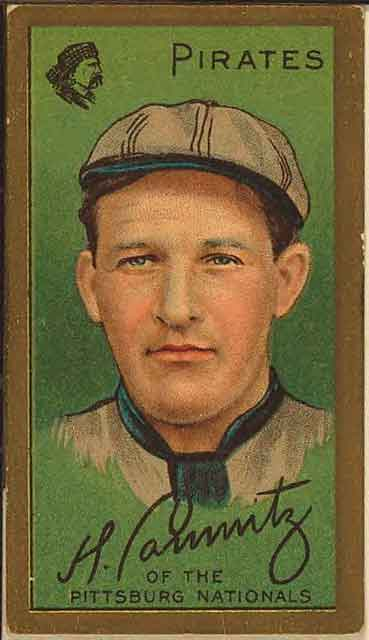
Howie Camnitz made four Opening Day starts for the Pirates.

Season	Pitcher	Decision	Final score	Opponent	Location	Ref(s)
1882	Jack Leary	(W)	10–9	Cincinnati Red Stockings	Bank Street Grounds	
1883	Denny Driscoll	(L)	0–4	Philadelphia Athletics	Exposition Park I	
1884	John Fox	(L)	2–9	Philadelphia Athletics	Recreation Park	
1885	Ed Morris	(W)	7–0	St. Louis Browns	Sportsman's Park	
1886	Ed Morris (2)	(L)	4–8	St. Louis Browns	Sportsman's Park	
1887	Pud Galvin	(W)	6–2	Chicago White Stockings	Recreation Park	
1888	Ed Morris (3)	(W)	5–2	Detroit Wolverines	Recreation Park	
1889	Pud Galvin (2)	(W)	8–5	Chicago White Stockings	Recreation Park	
1890	Pete Daniels	(W)	3–2	Cleveland Spiders	Recreation Park	
1891	Pud Galvin (3)	(L)	6–7	Chicago Colts	Exposition Park III	
1892	Mark Baldwin	(W)	7–5	Cincinnati Reds	League Park	
1893	Frank Killen	(L)	2–7	Cleveland Spiders	Exposition Park III	
1894	Frank Killen (2)	(L)	3–11	St. Louis Browns	Robison Field	
1895	Frank Killen (3)	(L)	2–11	Louisville Colonels	Eclipse Park	
1896	Pink Hawley	(W)	9–1	Cincinnati Reds	League Park	
1897	Frank Killen (4)	(W)	4–1	St. Louis Browns	Robison Field	
1898	Frank Killen (5)	(L)	3–10	Louisville Colonels	Eclipse Park	
1899	Jesse Tannehill	(W)	5–2	Cincinnati Reds	League Park	
1900	Sam Leever	(L)	0–3	St. Louis Cardinals	Robison Field	
1901**	Sam Leever (2)	(W)	4–2	Cincinnati Reds	League Park	
1902**	Deacon Phillippe	(W)	1–0	St. Louis Cardinals	Robison Field	
1903**	Deacon Phillippe (2)	(W)	7–1	Cincinnati Reds	Palace of the Fans	
1904	Deacon Phillippe (3)	(W)	5–4	St. Louis Cardinals	Robison Field	
1905	Patsy Flaherty	(W)	9–4	Cincinnati Reds	Palace of the Fans	
1906	Vic Willis	(W)	2–1	St. Louis Cardinals	Robison Field	
1907	Deacon Phillippe (4)	(L)	3–4	Cincinnati Reds	Palace of the Fans	
1908	Howie Camnitz	(W)	3–1	St. Louis Cardinals	Robison Field	
1909⁂	Howie Camnitz (2)	(W)	3–0	Cincinnati Reds	Palace of the Fans	
1910	Howie Camnitz (3)	(W)	5–1	St. Louis Cardinals	Robison Field	
1911	Babe Adams	W	14–0	Cincinnati Reds	Palace of the Fans	
1912	Howie Camnitz (4)	(L)	0–7	St. Louis Cardinals	Robison Field	
1913	Babe Adams (2)	(W)	9–2	Cincinnati Reds	Redland Field	
1914	Babe Adams (3)	(L)	1–2	St. Louis Cardinals	Robison Field	
1915	George McQuillan	(W)	9–2	Cincinnati Reds	Redland Field	
1916	Erv Kantlehner	(L)	1–2	St. Louis Cardinals	Robison Field	
1917	Elmer Jacobs	(L)	3–5	Chicago Cubs	Weeghman Park	
1918	Wilbur Cooper	(L)	0–2	Cincinnati Reds	Redland Field	
1919	Wilbur Cooper (2)	(L)	1–5	Chicago Cubs	Weeghman Park	
1920	Babe Adams (4)	W	5–4	St. Louis Cardinals	Robison Field	
1921	Babe Adams (5)	L	3–5	Cincinnati Reds	Redland Field	
1922	Wilbur Cooper (3)	L	1–10	St. Louis Cardinals	Sportsman's Park	
1923	Johnny Morrison	W	3–2	Chicago Cubs	Cubs Park	
1924	Johnny Morrison (2)	ND (L)	5–6	Cincinnati Reds	Redland Field	
1925⁂	Emil Yde	L	2–8	Chicago Cubs	Cubs Park	
1926	Vic Aldridge	L	6–7	St. Louis Cardinals	Sportsman's Park	
1927**	Ray Kremer	W	2–1	Cincinnati Reds	Redland Field	
1928	Ray Kremer (2)	L	7–14	St. Louis Cardinals	Sportsman's Park	
1929	Burleigh Grimes	W	4–3	Chicago Cubs	Wrigley Field	
1930	Ray Kremer (3)	ND (W)	7–6	Cincinnati Reds	Redland Field	
1931	Larry French	(L)	2–6	Chicago Cubs	Wrigley Field	
1932	Larry French (2)	(L)	2–10	St. Louis Cardinals	Sportsman's Park	
1933	Bill Swift	W	4–1	Cincinnati Reds	Redland Field	
1934	Heinie Meine	(L)	1–7	St. Louis Cardinals	Sportsman's Park	
1935	Waite Hoyt	W	12–6	Cincinnati Reds	Crosley Field	
1936	Cy Blanton	ND (W)	8–6	Cincinnati Reds	Crosley Field	
1937	Cy Blanton (2)	W	5–0	Chicago Cubs	Wrigley Field	
1938	Cy Blanton (3)	ND (W)	4–3	St. Louis Cardinals	Sportsman's Park	
1939	Cy Blanton (4)	W	7–5	Cincinnati Reds	Crosley Field	
1940	Bob Klinger	W	6–4	St. Louis Cardinals	Sportsman's Park	
1941	Bob Klinger (2)	(L)	4–7	Chicago Cubs	Wrigley Field	
1942	Max Butcher	W	4–2	Cincinnati Reds	Crosley Field	
1943	Rip Sewell	W	6–0	Chicago Cubs	Wrigley Field	
1944	Preacher Roe	(L)	0–2	St. Louis Cardinals	Sportsman's Park	
1945	Fritz Ostermueller	(L)	6–7	Cincinnati Reds	Crosley Field	
1946	Fritz Ostermueller (2)	ND (W)	6–4	St. Louis Cardinals	Sportsman's Park	
1947	Rip Sewell (2)	W	1–0	Chicago Cubs	Wrigley Field	
1948	Hal Gregg	(L)	1–4	Cincinnati Reds	Crosley Field	
1949	Rip Sewell (3)	W	1–0	Chicago Cubs	Wrigley Field	
1950	Bob Chesnes	(L)	2–4	St. Louis Cardinals	Sportsman's Park	
1951	Cliff Chambers	W	4–3	Cincinnati Reds	Crosley Field	
1952	Murry Dickson	L	2–3	St. Louis Cardinals	Sportsman's Park	
1953	Murry Dickson (2)	L	5–8	Brooklyn Dodgers	Ebbets Field	
1954	Bob Friend	ND (W)	4–2	Philadelphia Phillies	Forbes Field	
1955	Max Surkont	L	1–6	Brooklyn Dodgers	Ebbets Field	
1956	Bob Friend (2)	L	3–4	New York Giants	Polo Grounds	
1957	Bob Friend (3)	W	9–2	New York Giants	Forbes Field	
1958	Bob Friend (4)	ND (W)	4–3	Milwaukee Braves	County Stadium	
1959	Ron Kline	L	1–4	Cincinnati Reds	Crosley Field	
1960⁂	Bob Friend (5)	ND (L)	3–4	Milwaukee Braves	County Stadium	
1961	Bob Friend (6)	ND (W)	8–7	San Francisco Giants	Candlestick Park	
1962	Bob Friend (7)	W	6–0	Philadelphia Phillies	Forbes Field	
1963	Earl Francis	L	2–5	Cincinnati Reds	Crosley Field	
1964	Bob Veale	ND (L)	8–4	Chicago Cubs	Forbes Field	
1965	Bob Veale (2)	W	1–0	San Francisco Giants	Forbes Field	
1966	Bob Veale (3)	ND (W)	3–2	Atlanta Braves	Atlanta–Fulton County Stadium	
1967	Bob Veale (4)	W	6–3	New York Mets	Shea Stadium	
1968	Jim Bunning	ND (L)	4–5	Houston Astros	Astrodome	
1969	Steve Blass	ND (W)	6–2	St. Louis Cardinals	Busch Stadium	
1970*	Steve Blass (2)	ND (L)	3–5	New York Mets	Forbes Field	
1971⁂	Dock Ellis	W	4–2	Philadelphia Phillies	Three Rivers Stadium	
1972*	Dock Ellis (2)	L	0–4	New York Mets	Shea Stadium	
1973	Steve Blass (3)	ND (W)	7–5	St. Louis Cardinals	Three Rivers Stadium	
1974*	Jerry Reuss	ND (L)	5–6	St. Louis Cardinals	Busch Stadium	
1975*	Dock Ellis (3)	ND (W)	8–4	Chicago Cubs	Wrigley Field	
1976	Doc Medich	ND (W)	5–4	Philadelphia Phillies	Veterans Stadium	
1977	Jerry Reuss (2)	L	6–12	St. Louis Cardinals	Three Rivers Stadium	
1978	John Candelaria	W	1–0	Chicago Cubs	Three Rivers Stadium	
1979⁂	Bert Blyleven	ND (L)	2–3	Montreal Expos	Three Rivers Stadium	
1980	Bert Blyleven (2)	L	0–1	St. Louis Cardinals	Busch Stadium	
1981	Jim Bibby	ND (L)	2–6	Montreal Expos	Three Rivers Stadium	
1982	Rick Rhoden	ND (W)	11–7	St. Louis Cardinals	Busch Stadium	
1983	John Candelaria (2)	W	7–1	St. Louis Cardinals	Busch Stadium	
1984	Rick Rhoden (2)	L	1–5	San Diego Padres	Jack Murphy Stadium	
1985	Rick Rhoden (3)	L	1–2	Chicago Cubs	Wrigley Field	
1986	Rick Reuschel	L	2–4	New York Mets	Three Rivers Stadium	
1987	Bob Patterson	L	2–3	New York Mets	Shea Stadium	
1988	Mike Dunne	W	5–3	Philadelphia Phillies	Veterans Stadium	
1989	Bob Walk	ND (L)	5–6	Montreal Expos	Olympic Stadium	
1990*	Doug Drabek	W	12–3	New York Mets	Shea Stadium	
1991*	Doug Drabek (2)	L	0–7	Montreal Expos	Three Rivers Stadium	
1992*	Doug Drabek (3)	W	2–0	Montreal Expos	Three Rivers Stadium	
1993	Tim Wakefield	W	9–4	San Diego Padres	Three Rivers Stadium	
1994	Zane Smith	L	0–8	San Francisco Giants	Candlestick Park	
1995	Jon Lieber	L	2–6	Montreal Expos	Three Rivers Stadium	
1996	Paul Wagner	W	4–0	Florida Marlins	Joe Robbie Stadium	
1997	Jon Lieber (2)	ND (W)	5–2	San Francisco Giants	Candlestick Park	
1998	Francisco Córdova	W	4–0	Montreal Expos	Olympic Stadium	
1999	Francisco Córdova (2)	L	2–9	Montreal Expos	Three Rivers Stadium	
2000	Jason Schmidt	L	2–5	Houston Astros	Three Rivers Stadium	
2001	Todd Ritchie	L	2–3	Cincinnati Reds	Cinergy Field	
2002	Ron Villone	L	2–6	New York Mets	Shea Stadium	
2003	Kris Benson	W	10–1	Cincinnati Reds	Great American Ball Park	
2004	Kip Wells	W	2–1	Philadelphia Phillies	PNC Park	
2005	Óliver Pérez	L	2–9	Milwaukee Brewers	PNC Park	
2006	Óliver Pérez (2)	ND (L)	2–5	Milwaukee Brewers	Miller Park	
2007	Zach Duke	ND (W)	4–2	Houston Astros	Minute Maid Park	
2008	Ian Snell	ND (W)	12–11	Atlanta Braves	Turner Field	
2009	Paul Maholm	ND (W)	6–4	St. Louis Cardinals	Busch Stadium	
2010	Zach Duke (2)	W	11–5	Los Angeles Dodgers	PNC Park	
2011	Kevin Correia	W	6–3	Chicago Cubs	Wrigley Field	
2012	Érik Bédard	L	1–0	Philadelphia Phillies	PNC Park	
2013*	A. J. Burnett	L	3–1	Chicago Cubs	PNC Park	
2014*	Francisco Liriano	ND (W)	1–0	Chicago Cubs	PNC Park	
2015*	Francisco Liriano (2)	ND (L)	2–5	Cincinnati Reds	Great American Ball Park	
2016	Francisco Liriano (3)	W	4–1	St. Louis Cardinals	PNC Park	
2017	Gerrit Cole	L	3–5	Boston Red Sox	Fenway Park	
2018	Iván Nova	ND (W)	13–10	Detroit Tigers	Comerica Park	
2019	Jameson Taillon	L	3–5	Cincinnati Reds	Great American Ball Park	
2020	Joe Musgrove	L	4–5	St. Louis Cardinals	Busch Stadium	
2021	Chad Kuhl	ND (W)	5–3	Chicago Cubs	Wrigley Field	
2022	J. T. Brubaker	L	0–9	St. Louis Cardinals	Busch Stadium	
2023	Mitch Keller	ND (W)	5–4	Cincinnati Reds	Great American Ball Park	
2024	Mitch Keller (2)	ND (W)	6–5	Miami Marlins	LoanDepot Park	
2025	Paul Skenes	ND (L)	4–5	Miami Marlins	LoanDepot Park	
2026	Paul Skenes (2)	L	7–11	New York Mets	Citi Field	
