= Edward Cahill =

Edward Cahill may refer to:

- Edward Cahill (judge) (1843–1922), justice of the Michigan Supreme Court in 1890
- Edward Cahill (priest) (1868–1941), Irish Jesuit priest and academic
- Edward Cahill (pianist) (1885–1975), Australian concert pianist
- Edward F. Cahill, American football and basketball coach
- Ted Cahill (Australian footballer) (1902–1968), Australian rules footballer in the 1920s
- Ted Cahill (rugby league), English rugby league footballer of the 1950s
