= George Cahill =

George Cahill may refer to:

- George F. Cahill (1869–1935), American inventor
- George F. Cahill Jr. (1927–2012), American scientist
