= Kitty Burke =

American entertainer

Kitty Burke was a nightclub entertainer from Cincinnati, Ohio who was noted for being the only female to ever attempt to bat in a Major League Baseball game, albeit unofficially.

On July 31, 1935, Burke was sitting in the stands at Crosley Field during a game between the Cincinnati Reds and the St. Louis Cardinals when she began heckling the players. In what may have been a publicity stunt, she then strode to the on-deck circle, took Babe Herman's bat and proceeded to "pinch hit". She ended up grounding out to first base; however, the appearance was purely informal, and the umpires did not count this as an official at bat or out, as she was not on the roster. Allegedly, the Reds later gave her a uniform which she used while performing her act.
