= Michael Moran (writer) =

Australian travel writer, novelist, musician

Michael Moran (born 1947) is an Australian travel writer, novelist, musician and teacher. He has written a novel called Point Venus (1998) and two travel books: Beyond the Coral Sea: Travels in the Old Empires of the South-West Pacific (2003) and A Country in the Moon: Travels in Search of the Heart of Poland.

Beyond the Coral Sea was short-listed for the 2004 Thomas Cook Travel Book Award, while A Country in the Moon has received widespread praise in the press.

His grand uncle was the Australian concert pianist Edward Cahill. Moran has published a biography of Cahill, entitled The Pocket Paderewski: The Beguiling Life of the Australian Concert Pianist Edward Cahill. (Australian Scholarly Publishing 2016)

Moran is a Fellow of the Royal Geographical Society, and divides his time between Warsaw, Sydney and London.
