= Bob Klinger =

American baseball player (1908–1977)

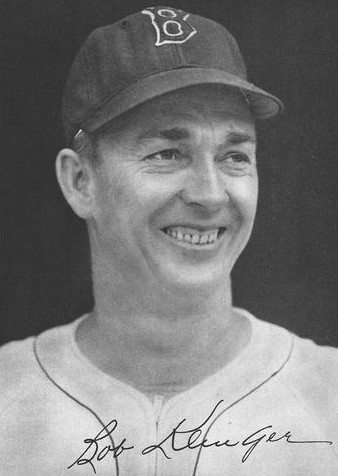
- Kilinger in 1947
- Pitcher
- Born: June 4, 1908; Allenton, Missouri, U.S.
- Died: August 19, 1977 (aged 69); Villa Ridge, Missouri, U.S.
- Batted: Right Threw: Right

MLB debut
- April 19, 1938, for the Pittsburgh Pirates

Last MLB appearance
- September 23, 1947, for the Boston Red Sox

MLB statistics
- Win–loss record: 66–61
- Earned run average: 3.68
- Strikeouts: 357
- Stats at Baseball Reference

Teams
- Pittsburgh Pirates (1938–1943); Boston Red Sox (1946–1947)

Robert Harold Klinger (June 4, 1908 – August 19, 1977) was an American professional baseball player who was a right-handed pitcher in Major League Baseball over parts of eight seasons from 1938 through 1947. He played for the Pittsburgh Pirates and the Boston Red Sox. In 265 career appearances he compiled a 66–61 record along with 23 saves, with a 3.68 earned run average and 357 strikeouts. His cousin Charlie Hollocher was also a Major League Baseball player.

== Path to the majors ==
Klinger played in the minor leagues for nine years (1929–1937) at levels from Class C through Class AA. Starting in 1931 he was with teams within the St. Louis Cardinals' farm system; in 1937 he reached the Pacific Coast League with the Sacramento Solons. Although he compiled a 19–13 record with the Solons, the Cardinals did not protect him in that year's Rule 5 draft, and he was selected by the Pittsburgh Pirates.

== Pittsburgh Pirates ==
In 1938, Klinger got a win in his first major league appearance; on Opening Day he pitched the final two innings as the Pirates scored two runs in the top of the ninth inning to defeat the Cardinals, 4–3. For the season, his record was 12–5 with a 2.99 ERA. The next two seasons were more challenging for Klinger; in 1939 his record was 14–17 with a 4.36 ERA, followed in 1940 with an 8–13 record and 5.39 ERA.

In 1941, Klinger appeared more as a reliever, starting only nine games while making 35 appearances – his record was 9–4 with a 3.93 ERA. Klinger's record fell to 8–11 in 1942 with a 3.24 ERA, then improved to 11–8 for 1943 with a 2.72 ERA. In 1944, he was drafted into the US Navy and missed both the 1944 and 1945 seasons due to his military service.

Klinger entered the 1946 season with the Pirates, but did not appear in any games before being released on May 7. Overall during his years with the Pirates, Klinger compiled a record of 62–58 along with nine saves and a 3.74 ERA, while appearing in 209 games (129 of them starts) and hitting for a .201 average.

== Boston Red Sox ==
Two days after being released by Pittsburgh, Klinger was signed by Boston, where he served primarily as a relief pitcher. During the 1946 regular season, he made 28 appearances with just 1 start – a no decision in his first appearance – and had a league-leading 9 saves, with a 3–2 record and a 2.37 ERA. That year, the Red Sox ran away with the American League crown by twelve games over the Detroit Tigers with a 104–50 record, and were heavy favorites in the World Series against the St. Louis Cardinals, however the series went the full seven games.

In game seven, Klinger was involved in a famous play known as the "mad dash". The Red Sox had tied the score at 3–3 in the top half of the eighth inning, and Klinger came in to pitch the bottom of the eighth – starter Dave Ferriss had been replaced by reliever Joe Dobson in the fifth inning, and Dobson had been lifted for pinch hitter George Metkovich during the Red Sox rally in the eighth. Enos Slaughter led off the bottom half of the inning with a single off of Klinger. After a failed bunt attempt by Whitey Kurowski and a flyout to left field by Del Rice, Slaughter found himself still on first base with two outs. With outfielder Harry Walker at the plate with a two balls and one strike count, the Cardinals called for a hit and run.

With Slaughter running, Walker lined Klinger's pitch to left-center field. Leon Culberson fielded the ball, and threw a relay to shortstop Johnny Pesky. Slaughter rounded third base heading for home, running through the stop sign from his third base coach. What exactly happened when Pesky turned around is still a matter of contention, but catcher Roy Partee caught a delayed throw up the line, allowing Slaughter to score what proved to be the winning run.

Klinger issued an intentional walk to the next batter, then was relieved by Earl Johnson who got a ground out to retire the Cardinals. When the Red Sox were unable to score in the top of the ninth (despite their first two batters getting on base), Klinger was charged with the loss. It was his only appearance in the series – 5 batters faced, 2/3 innings pitched, and 1 earned run – and the only postseason series of his career.

During the 1947 season, Klinger again made 28 appearances; he registered 5 saves, and had a 1–1 record with a 3.86 ERA. He was released during the final week of the season, drawing a close to his MLB career. In his two seasons with Boston he had 14 saves, a record of 4–3, and a 3.00 ERA while appearing in 56 games (55 of them in relief) and hitting for a .240 average.

Overall, Klinger was a better than average hitting pitcher in his career, batting .204 (71-for-348) with 28 runs, 5 doubles, 21 RBI, 20 walks and 18 sacrifice hits. Defensively, he compiled a .980 fielding percentage with only 6 errors in 301 total chances in 1089 2/3 innings pitched.

== Later career ==
During the next three seasons (1948–1950), Klinger, now in his forties, played for four different minor league teams, mostly at the Class AAA level. His final team was the Jersey City Giants of the International League. Klinger died in an automobile accident in Villa Ridge, Missouri, at the age of 69.

== See also ==
- List of Major League Baseball annual saves leaders
- List of Pittsburgh Pirates Opening Day starting pitchers
