= Palace of the Fans =

Former baseball park in Cincinnati, Ohio USA

- League Park III
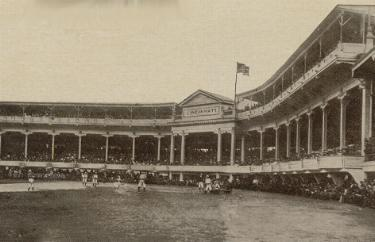
- Interactive map of Palace of the Fans
- Former names: League Park (1884–1901)
- Location: Findlay St. & McLean Ave., Cincinnati, Ohio
- Coordinates: 39°7′1″N 84°32′12″W
- Capacity: 12,000
- Surface: Grass
- Field size: Left Field – 360 ft (109.7 m); Left-Center – 418 ft (127.4 m); Center Field – 400 ft (121.9 m); Right-Center – 375 ft (114.3 m); Right Field – 450 ft (137.2 m)

Construction
- Groundbreaking: 1901
- Opened: April 17, 1902
- Closed: October 6, 1911
- Demolished: 1911

Tenants
- Cincinnati Reds (MLB) (1902–1911); Cincinnati Bearcats (NCAA) (1904–1906, 1908–1909)

Palace of the Fans was a Major League baseball park located in Cincinnati, Ohio. It was the home of the Cincinnati Reds from 1902 through 1911. The ballpark was on an asymmetrical block bounded by Findlay Street (south), Western Avenue (northeast, angling), York Street (north) and McLean Avenue (west).

The "Findlay and Western" intersection was the home field of the Reds from 1884 through June 24, 1970, when the team moved to Riverfront Stadium. The location of the diamond and consequently the main grandstand seating area was shifted several times during the 86½ seasons that the Reds played there. The Palace of the Fans was actually the second of three parks that stood on the site:

1884–1901: League Park (I and II)
1902–1911: Palace of the Fans aka League Park (III)
1912–1970: Redland Field, renamed Crosley Field in 1934

== History ==
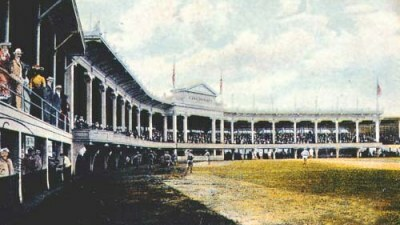
Main grandstand at Palace of the Fans

On May 28, 1900, the southwest grandstand of League Park, the home of the Reds since their days in the American Association, burned to the ground. The Reds were forced to spend most of May and June on the road while League Park was reconfigured to move the diamond back to its old location in the southeast corner.

After a season of playing in the southeast corner, Reds owner John Brush announced the club would build a new grandstand for the next season. The project started ambitiously in the spring of 1901. The term "Palace of the Fans" first appeared in March. The club hoped to have the new stands ready by summer, but various delays set the opening back to spring of 1902, so the entire 1901 season was also spent at the southeast corner.

The Palace of the Fans, so audaciously named, also presented a striking appearance. Designed in a neo-classic style reminiscent of Chicago's World's Columbian Exposition of 1893, the Palace featured an extravagant facade, with 22 hand-carved Corinthian columns with elaborate details at the top, and opera-style private boxes in front of the covered grandstand. The grandstand actually sat atop carriage stalls so that the wealthy could simply drive directly to the game, an early precursor of "luxury suites". It was built mostly of concrete, and was the second park (after Baker Bowl in Philadelphia) to use concrete for the bulk of its construction.

The grandstand was unique: a blend of Roman and Greek styling that had never been used before in a grandstand, and has never been seen since. The 3,000-seat grandstand featured 19 "fashion boxes" along the front railing that could hold 15 or more well-to-do fans. Beneath the grandstand, at field level, was standing room for 640 more spectators in a rowdy section known as "Rooter's Row." This section was so close to the players, the fans could take part in on-field conversations. Rooters Row was also strategically placed by the bar. The facade behind home plate contained the word "CINCINNATI". This was obviously of no benefit to anyone in attendance, assuming they knew where they were, but it ensured that pictures of the stands would inform viewers. However, the designers of the park forgot to include dugouts or clubhouses for the players.

The original 1884 stand remained as right field seating, having escaped the fire. A less elaborate stand connected the old and the new structures. Both the contemporary club owners and modern baseball historians consider the 1902 structure to be a new ballpark. Cincinnati fans not interested in the hype continued to call the facility League Park, hence the alternate historical name, "League Park III". Newspapers used the two names interchangeably, along with the occasional variant Fans' Palace.

On Opening Day, April 17, 1902, some 10,000 spectators crowded into the park and watched the Reds lose to the Chicago Colts (a.k.a. "Cubs"), 6-1.

The Reds had little on-field success during their stay at the Palace, but one event foreshadowed an historic development on this site: night baseball. On June 19, 1909, an exhibition game was held at the Palace under temporary lighting developed by George F. Cahill. This was not the first time night baseball had been attempted, but this experiment was deemed a success. In addition a soccer game between a Cincinnati team and a British touring team and a football game between the Gyms and Christ Church were held on October 14, 1909. Nothing would come of it, though, until the 1930s when night ball came to be seen as a necessity for boosting attendance and keeping ball clubs financially more secure.

When it opened, the Palace had been described as "the handsomest grounds in the country". However, as with the original Columbian Exposition buildings, the Palace soon lost its lustre. For one thing, the seating area was too small. Then, over time, the structure fell into a state of disrepair; city inspectors began to note cracked girders, decayed supports and unsafe floors.

The last game played at the Palace was on October 12, 1911, against the Cubs, the same team they played when the park was opened. The day's newspapers stated that as soon as the game was completed, workmen would begin demolishing the Palace to make way for new stands. Some sources also state that a fire accompanied that demolition. In any case, the Palace was done after 10 seasons.

Although the modified original 1884 grandstand (aka the right field seating) had survived various calamities during its 27 years of existence, the Reds had no intention of using it again. The remains of the entirety of the Palace of the Fans were demolished to make room for "a modern and sumptuous stand, the equal of anything in the country."

By opening day of 1912, the Reds had an entirely new ballpark waiting for them on the site: Redland Field, which would later become known as Crosley Field. Its right field corner seating and its "sun deck" bleachers stood as an echo of the original 1884 stands.

== Gallery ==
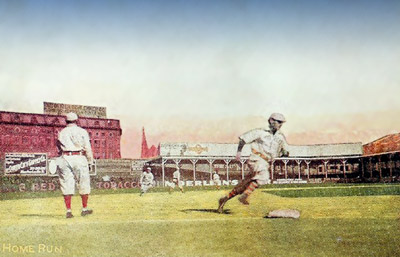
Early 20th century postcard of a game at Palace of the Fans, with remnant of original 1884 stands now in use as right field seats

Ballpark changes for the 1903 season

Test of field lights in 1909

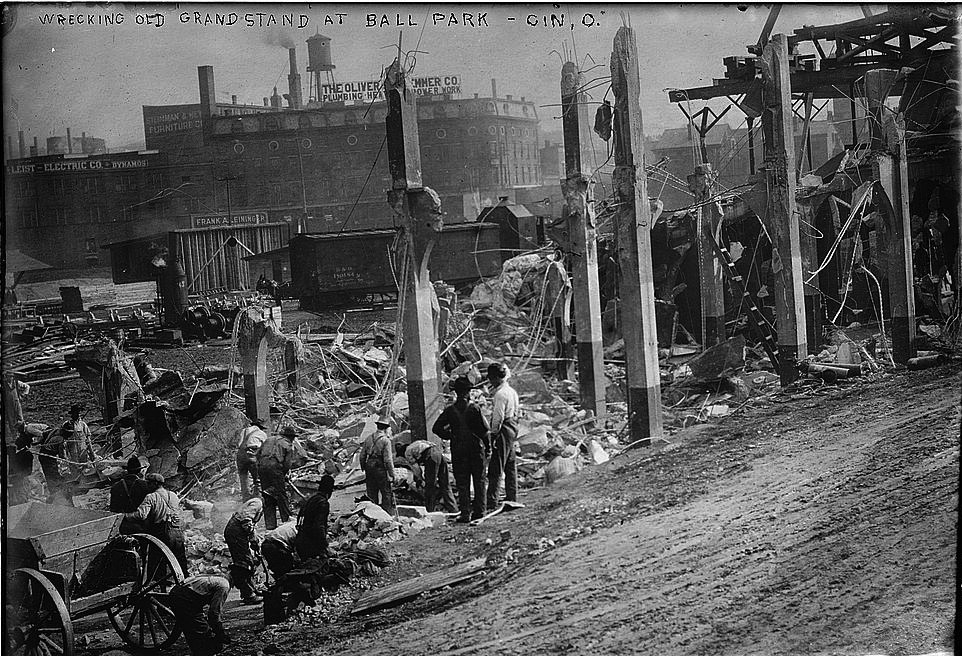
Demolition of the ballpark on November 14, 1911

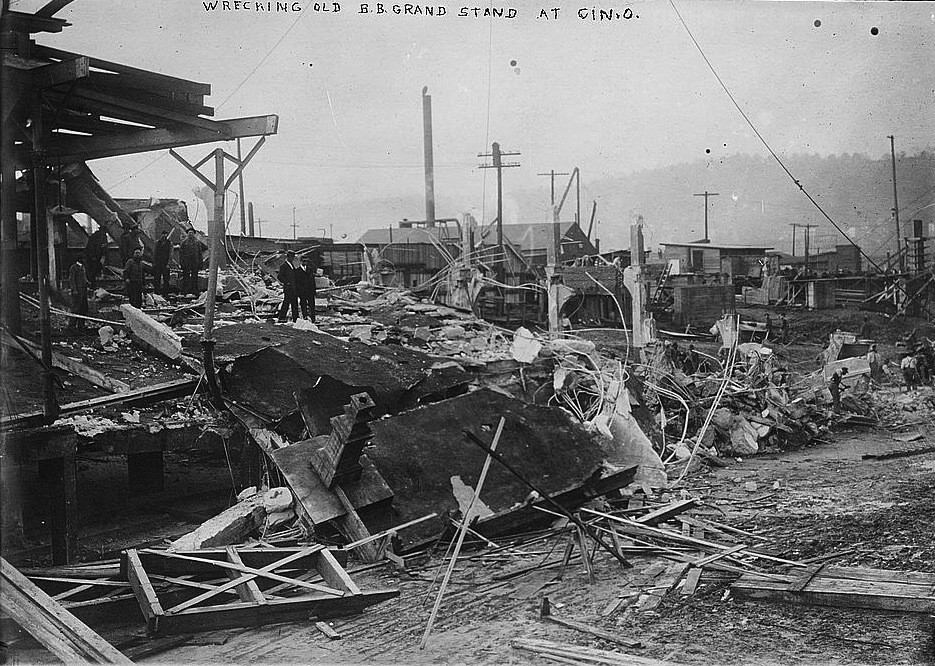
Demolition of the ballpark on November 14, 1911

== Sources ==
- Cincinnati's Crosley Field: The Illustrated History of a Classic Ballpark by Greg Rhodes and John Erardi, 1995, Road West Publishing
- Baseball Library.com
- Green Cathedrals, by Phil Lowry, 1992
- Baseball Parks of North America, by Michael Benson, 1989
- The Cincinnati Reds, by Lee Allen, Putnam, 1948.

Preceded by League Park	Home of the Cincinnati Reds; 1902–1911	Succeeded by Redland Field
