= Crosley Field =

Major League Baseball park in Cincinnati, Ohio

- League Park IV; Schwab's Field; The Old Boomerang; Findlay & Western
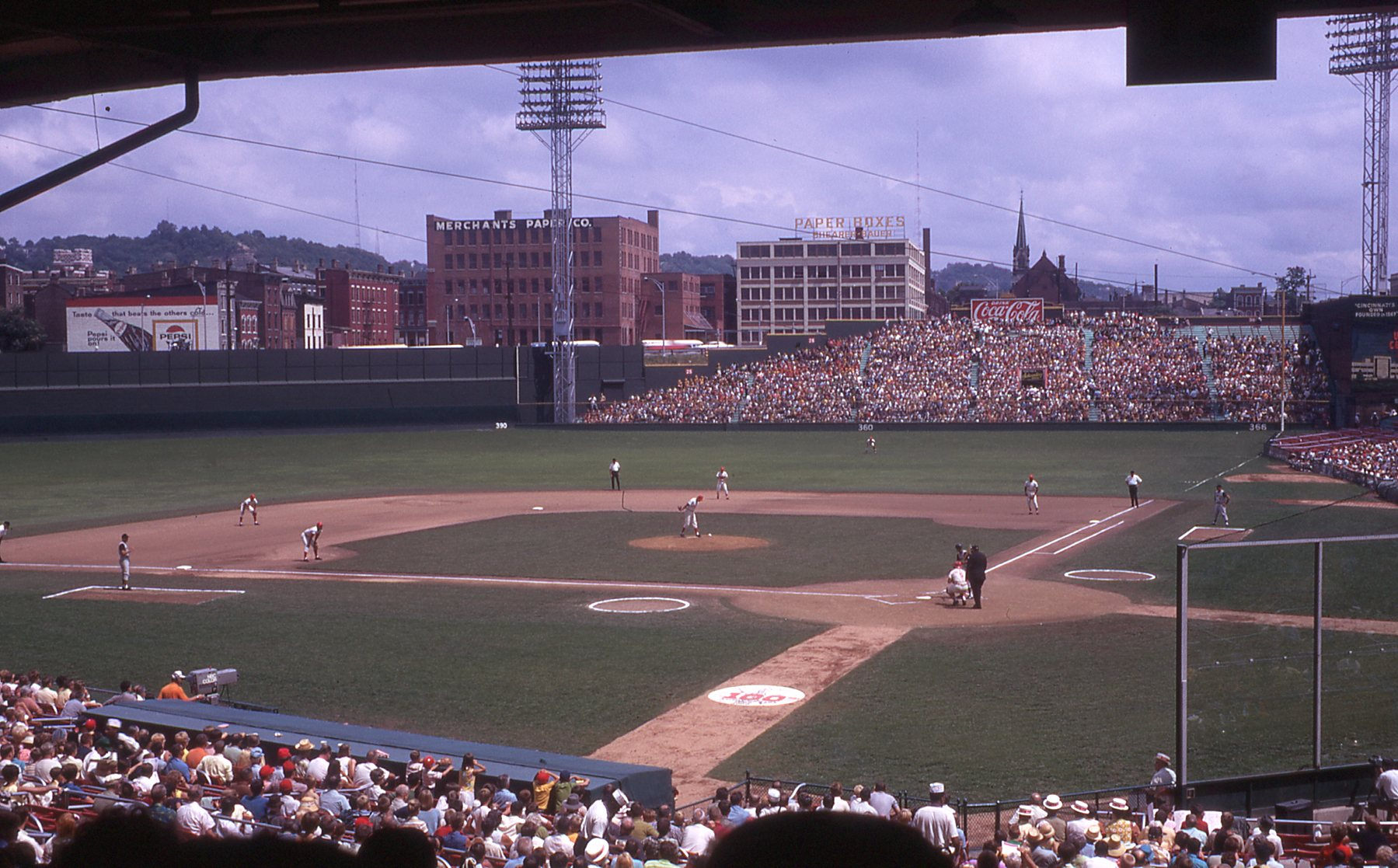
- Crosley Field in 1969, its final full season.
- Interactive map of Crosley Field
- Former names: Redland Field (1912–1933)
- Location: Findlay Street and Dalton Avenue, Cincinnati
- Coordinates: 39°7′0″N 84°32′7″W
- Owner: Cincinnati Reds
- Operator: Cincinnati Reds
- Capacity: 20,696 (1912–1926); 26,060 (1927–1937); 29,401 (1938–1946); 30,101 (1947–1950); 29,980 (1951–1952); 29,439 (1953–1955); 29,584 (1956–1958); 30,322 (1959–1963); 29,603 (1964–1969); 29,488 (1970)
- Surface: Grass
- Field size: 1912; Left Field — 360 feet (110 m); Left-Center — 380 feet (116 m); Center Field — 420 feet (128 m); Right-Center — 383 feet (117 m); Right Field — 360 feet (110 m); Backstop — 38 feet (12 m); 1958; Left Field — 328 feet (100 m); Left-Center — 380 feet (116 m); Center Field — 387 feet (118 m); Right-Center — 383 feet (117 m); Right Field — 366 feet (112 m); Backstop — 78 feet (24 m)

Construction
- Groundbreaking: 1911
- Opened: April 11, 1912
- Closed: June 24, 1970
- Demolished: April 19, 1972
- Cost: US$225,000 ($7.51 million in 2025 dollars)
- Architect: Harry Hake

Tenants
- Cincinnati Reds (MLB) (1912–1970); Cincinnati Cuban Stars (NNL) (1921); Cincinnati Reds (NFL) (1933–1934); Cincinnati Bengals (AFL) (1937, 1941–1943); Cincinnati Tigers (NAL) (1937); Cincinnati Buckeyes (NAL) (1942); Cincinnati Clowns (NAL) (1943–1945)

Crosley Field was a Major League Baseball park in Cincinnati, Ohio. It was the home field of the National League's Cincinnati Reds from 1912 through June 24, 1970, and the original Cincinnati Bengals football team, members of the second (1937) and third American Football League (1940–41). It was not the original home of the current NFL franchise of the same name: the home of those Bengals in 1968 and 1969 was nearby Nippert Stadium, located on the campus of the University of Cincinnati. Crosley Field was on an asymmetrical block bounded by Findlay Street (south), Western Avenue (northeast, angling), Dalton Avenue (east), York Street (north) and McLean Avenue (west) in the Queensgate section of the city. Crosley has the distinction of being the first major-league park with lights for playing night games.

The "Findlay and Western" intersection was the home field of the Reds from 1884 until mid-season 1970, when the team moved to Riverfront Stadium. The location of the diamond and consequently the main grandstand seating area was shifted several times during the 86 1/2 seasons that the Reds played at the site. Three different parks stood there:

1884–1901: League Park
1902–1911: Palace of the Fans
1912–1970: Redland Field, renamed Crosley Field in 1934

== History ==
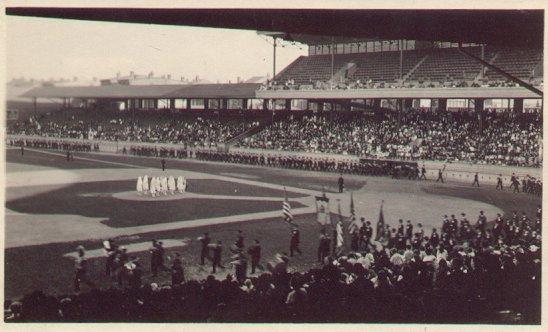
Redland Field c. 1920

=== Rebuilding ===
Between the 1911 and 1912 seasons, the entire seating area of the Palace of the Fans and the remaining seating from the original League Park were demolished. They were replaced with the third steel-and-concrete stadium in the National League. It consisted of a double-deck grandstand around the diamond, positioned in the southwest corner of the lot. Beyond first and third base were single-deck covered pavilions extended to the corners, with bleachers in the right field area. The unusual angle of the covered areas down the lines, and behind home plate gave that area a distinctive "V" shape, giving rise to one of several nicknames the park had, "The Old Boomerang."

Redland Field, whose name was a reference to the Reds' name and color, was built for $225,000 by Harry Hake Sr.'s architectural firm. Initially, Cincinnati fans that were not interested in the new name continued to call the facility League Park (IV), just like with the Palace of the Fans. Unlike the Palace of the Fans, the new name of the ballpark stuck around and fans got used to it. It was one of many classic steel and concrete ballparks constructed during the first ballpark boom era of 1909–1923. Chicago's Wrigley Field and Boston's Fenway Park were also built during this era and remain in use today. Although occupying the site since 1884, the Reds dated their ballpark from the permanent structure opened in 1912.

Throughout its history, Redland/Crosley Field was usually among the smallest parks in the major leagues. It accommodated 25,000 fans in 1912; even at its peak, it barely exceeded 30,000 seats, excluding temporary seating areas created for opening day and World Series games. Contributing to this was the lack of bleachers in left or center fields; all outfield seating (about 4,500 seats), were in the semi-trapezoid-shaped right field stands that came to be known as the "Sun Deck" (or, in the case of night games, the "Moon Deck").

On August 3, 1919, up 2.5 games on the second place New York Giants, 43,000 fans crowded into the park to see the Reds host the Giants. The official attendance was 31,363, but it was reported in the press, "Forty-three thousand baseball enthusiasts were wadded tightly into every conceivable corner that would hold a human being and it was not the fault of the rooting that the Reds lost."

Groundskeeper Mathias "Matty" Schwab, who had been hired in 1894, had the sod laid just in time for the Reds' first game at the new park, April 11, 1912. In the game, the Reds rallied from a 5–0 deficit to defeat the Chicago Cubs 10–6, the same team that had opened and closed at the Palace in 1902 and 1911 respectively. Schwab would be the Reds' groundkeeper until he retired at age 83 in 1963.

The Reds' on-field success continued to be sparse most of the time, but the club won the National League pennant in 1919, the franchise's first league title in 37 years, going back to the AA inaugural season. It was also the 50th anniversary of the Cincinnati Red Stockings' historic tour, and was a celebratory occasion for Cincinnati fans, especially when they scored an upset win over the Chicago White Sox in the World Series. The win was tainted by the fact, made public a year later, that the Series had been "thrown" by the heavily favored Sox. The Reds gradually returned to mediocrity and attendance flagged.

=== Crosley and lights ===
When local businessman Powel Crosley Jr. bought the struggling Reds in 1934, team president Larry MacPhail insisted that the ballpark be renamed in honor of the man many thought had rescued the franchise. Thus, the park was renamed "Crosley Field", and Crosley himself took the opportunity to advertise his Crosley cars. Under Crosley's ownership, the park underwent notable structural renovations.

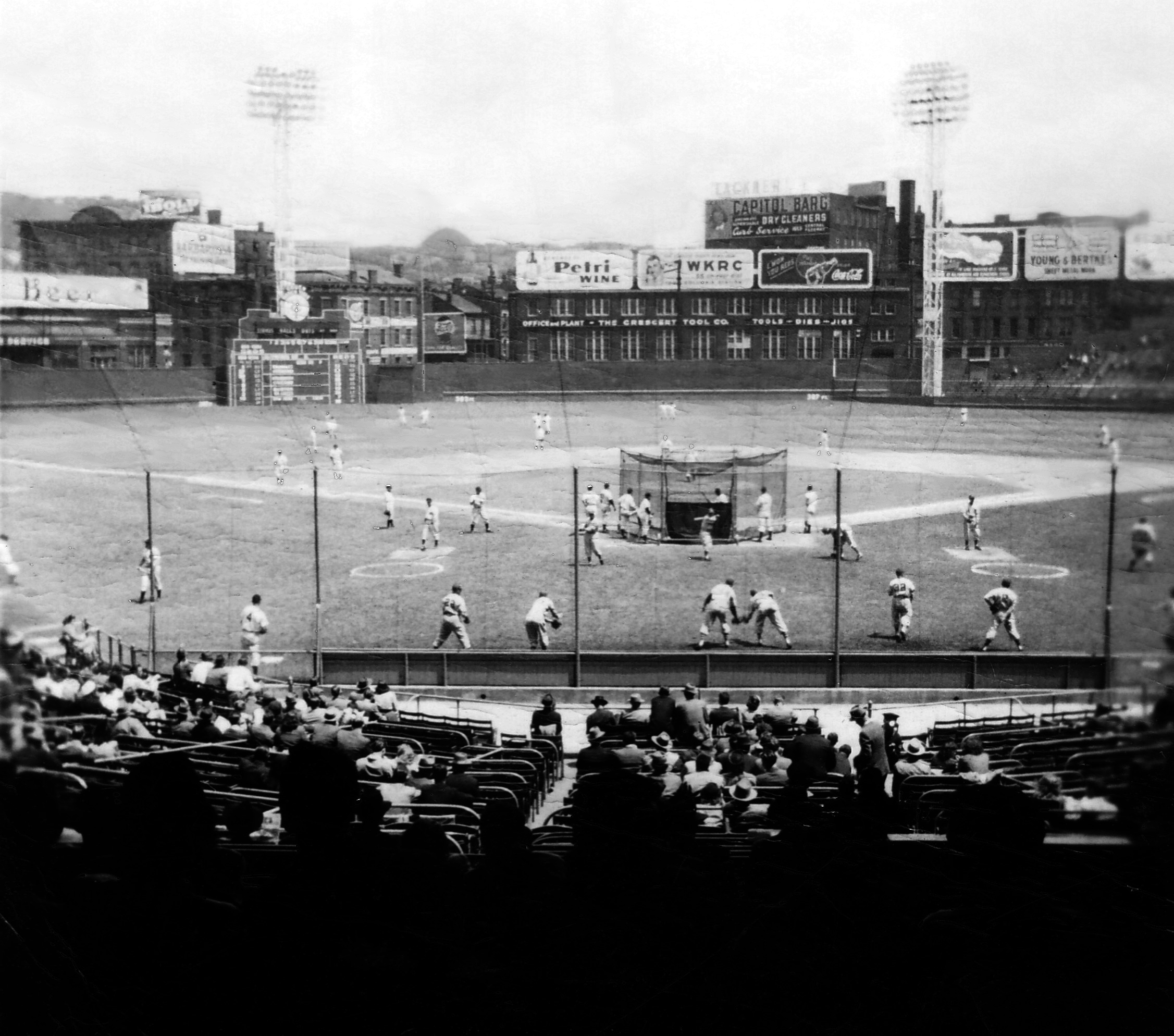
Crosley's lights are visible in this photo, taken in the late 1940s.

With the effects of the Great Depression in Cincinnati, the Reds convinced baseball owners to allow night baseball at Crosley Field. Without lights, Larry MacPhail insisted, the team would fold because of low attendance. Lights had been installed in a number of minor league ballparks in the early 1930s, with positive results. The major league owners acquiesced; 632 individual lamps in eight metal stanchions were erected in 1935 and the Reds hosted the Philadelphia Phillies under the lights on Friday, May 24. In attendance at the game was Ford Frick, president of the National League. In the White House, President Franklin D. Roosevelt pressed a button that lit up Crosley Field, where a crowd of 20,422 fans, sizable for a last-place team in the middle of the Great Depression, came out to watch the game. Lou Chiozza was the leadoff man for the Phillies and thus has the distinction of being the first player to bat under the lights in a night game in the majors. The Reds won the game 2–1 behind right-hander Paul Derringer.

On July 31, a large crowd showed up to see the visiting St. Louis Cardinals, the defending World Series champions, in the sixth night game at Crosley Field. As the game progressed, the throng of Reds fans forced people onto the field of play which caused mass confusion for the police and umpires. (This was during a time in baseball when overflow crowds were often allowed to sit or stand on the fringes of the playing field.) Reds manager Chuck Dressen could only follow the game via the scoreboard. At one point, he was heard to say: "I see the Cardinals got a run — but I don't know how they got it".

During a lull in the eighth inning, a local burlesque performer named Kitty Burke came out of the crowd, picked up the Reds outfielder Floyd "Babe" Herman's bat, stepped into the batter's box, and dared the Cardinals' starter, Paul "Daffy" Dean, to throw her a pitch. He accommodated Burke with a soft toss; Burke grounded weakly to first base. The "pinch hit" appearance was never recorded as an official at bat, of course, but nonetheless, Burke began promoting herself as the first woman in major league history. Allegedly, the Reds gave her a uniform.

Flood in January 1937

The late 1930s finally brought some prosperity to the club again, along with some changes to the ballpark. After the 1937 season, home plate was moved 20 feet (6 m) toward center field, decreasing the park's outfield dimensions while expanding foul ground. Left field was reduced from 339 to 328 feet (103 to 100 m); right field from 377 to 366 feet (115 to 112 m); and the deepest part of center field, at the corner of the Sun Deck, was reduced from 407 to 387 feet (124 to 118 m). In 1937, the Mill Creek flooded, submerging the field under 20 feet (6.1 m) of water. As a lark, Reds pitcher Lee Grissom and the team's traveling secretary, John McDonald, got into a rowboat and entered Crosley Field over the left field fence and rowed to the area of the pitcher's mound. There was a photographer present, of course, and the picture has been well-circulated since then. For example, it can be seen on p. 40–41 of Lost Ballparks, by Lawrence Ritter.

The following summer, Crosley hosted Cincinnati's first All-Star Game on Wednesday, July 6, 1938, won by the National League. In the middle of a pennant-winning season of 1939, their first in twenty years, the Reds added roofed upper decks to the left and right side pavilions, increasing the seating capacity by some 5,000 to give the ballpark the appearance it retained for the rest of its existence. The Reds lost the World Series to the powerful New York Yankees in a four-game sweep, but bounced back to win the pennant again in 1940, then defeated the Detroit Tigers in a seven-game thriller.

=== Later years ===
By the 1950s, the Reds were back to mediocrity, but they had some sluggers, including the muscle-bound Ted Kluszewski, who took full advantage of Crosley's cozy dimensions. Crosley Field again hosted the All-Star Game in 1953.

After a poor season in 1960, the "Ragamuffin Reds" put everything together in 1961 and won the National League pennant, an effort documented in pitcher Jim Brosnan's book, Pennant Race. The dream season ended for the Reds at the hand of the Yankees, whose slugging duo of Roger Maris and Mickey Mantle had demolished the rest of the American League. Maris, who had set a record with 61 home runs that season, also knocked one into the Moon Deck in the ninth inning of Game 3 of the World Series.

Crosley Field was the site of the major leagues' first save, after the save became an official statistic in 1969. Los Angeles Dodgers pitcher Bill Singer earned the save on April 7, 1969, in the season opener, working three scoreless innings after taking over for Dodgers starting and winning pitcher Don Drysdale. Singer did not allow a hit, walking one batter and striking out one, as the Dodgers beat the Reds, 3–2.

The Reds would continue to be a frequent contender, gradually building up toward what would become known as the "Big Red Machine". By the time the Reds reached that peak, though, Crosley would be but a memory. Crosley Field's decline had begun in earnest in the mid-1950s with the automobile supplanting the train as the main method of transportation. The ballpark was located in the dense west end. Businesses (such as the Superior Towel and Linen Service, a.k.a. "The Laundry", as well as a large factory) bounded the park on three sides. The neighborhood was not suited for the automobile; parking increasingly became a major problem in the last 15 years of Crosley Field's existence, as did crime — especially during night games.

Around 1960, Powel Crosley was courted by a group seeking to return a National League franchise to New York City to replace the Dodgers and the Giants, who had moved to Los Angeles and San Francisco respectively after the 1957 season. The moves left the American League Yankees as the city's sole baseball team. A move to New York was speculated in the media as early as 1957, prior to the Dodgers and Giants moving to California. Crosley was unwilling to move. However, he died the following year and his estate sold the team a few months later to Bill DeWitt, who kept Crosley's name on the park.

Complicating matters was that legendary football coach Paul Brown, the founder of the Cleveland Browns, who had been deposed by new owner Art Modell in 1963, was wanting to get back into professional football. He was granted an American Football League franchise for Cincinnati, the Bengals. A contingency of that agreement was that an appropriate facility be ready by the time the 1970 National Football League season began, which would be the first season that the AFL was fully merged with the NFL.

Aerial view of Crosley Field c. 1970.

An agreement was struck to build a multi-purpose facility on the dilapidated riverfront section of the city. Riverfront Stadium seated about 60,000 people and was deemed a logical solution to the myriad problems. The Reds were part of that agreement, and Crosley Field's end was in sight.

It was believed that the Sunday, September 28, 1969 game against the Houston Astros, which was that year's last home game for the Reds (who won 4–1), would be the final game ever at Crosley Field. However, delays in final construction of Riverfront Stadium, led to the Reds opening the 1970 season at Findlay and Western, against the Montreal Expos. New additions to the Reds that season were figures who would become Reds legends: manager George Lee "Sparky" Anderson and shortstop Dave Concepción, who had actually been signed by the Reds as an amateur free agent in 1967 as a pitcher. The 1970 Reds were pennant-bound, but Crosley Field did not figure into that event.

The Reds' last game at Crosley Field was played on June 24, 1970, against the San Francisco Giants. With the Reds trailing Juan Marichal and the Giants 4–3 in the eighth inning, catcher Johnny Bench tied the game on a solo home run. The next batter, first baseman Lee May won it on a solo shot of his own. The ninth inning was a relatively easy one for Reds reliever Wayne Granger; Bobby Bonds grounded out to first base. Jim McGlothlin, the starting pitcher for the Reds in their last game at Crosley Field, was also the starting pitcher for the team's first game at Riverfront Stadium.

One of the highlights of the closing festivities was mayor Eugene P. Ruehlmann taking home plate out of the ground and taking it via helicopter (which had landed on the field), to Riverfront Stadium and installed it in the artificial turf. After a brief road trip to Houston, which saw them sweep the Houston Astros, they returned to Cincinnati and opened Riverfront Stadium against the Atlanta Braves. They lost 8–2.

Crosley was the first of three Jewel Box era National League parks to close in 1970. Forbes Field, home of the Pittsburgh Pirates since 1909, closed four days later, and the Pirates moved into Three Rivers Stadium two days after Riverfront Stadium hosted the All-Star Game. Philadelphia's Connie Mack Stadium, which hosted the Athletics from 1909 through 1954 and Phillies since 1938, closed at the end of the season.

== The Terrace ==
The Crosley Field scoreboard with the Longines clock and the left field terrace. This photo was taken during the first game of a Reds/St. Louis Cardinals doubleheader on June 9, 1968. The Reds' Alex Johnson is pictured in left field

Crosley Field was usually among the smallest parks in Major League Baseball, both in seating capacity and playing field size.

Probably the most notable (or infamous) feature of Crosley Field otherwise was the fifteen-degree left field incline, called "the terrace". Terraces were not unusual in old ballparks. Most of them were constructed as a way to make up the difference between field level and street level on a sloping block, and most of them were leveled out ("Duffy's Cliff" at Fenway Park and Left Field bump at Wrigley Field are two examples).

The story of the Crosley Terrace is the reverse of the long-departed "Duffy's Cliff". There was no terrace in evidence during the ballpark's days as the Palace, which had a fairly high wall whose base was below street level. The terrace came about when the new ballpark was constructed for 1912. The club received permission to expand the playing field, by way of the city closing the eastbound lane of York Street. Instead of building a very high wall and retaining a level playing field, the club built a somewhat shorter wall with its base at roughly street level, with the sloping terrace making up the difference in grade.

As baseball boomed during the 1920s, many clubs built additional seating in their once-spacious outfield areas. The outfield area at Findlay and Western was already small, so building inner bleachers was not practical, and the Crosley terrace persisted and became one of the park's trademarks. It was used, as Duffy's Cliff had been, for temporary spectator seating, in the days when standing-room-only crowds would be allowed at the fringes of the field behind ropes. The terrace also served as a warning track, in lieu of the more typical dirt or gravel warning tracks that began to appear at most other ballparks by the 1950s. The slope was at least as much warning to an outfielder as a flat track was. Although the terrace was most prominent in left field, it extended clear across the outfield.

In later years, box seats were added to the terrace in the left field corner, in foul ground, directly facing the infield as the fair-territory seating once had. At the north end of the box-seat aisle, behind the corner boxes, and visible in some photos, was a stairway up to a roll-up exit gate to York Street. Another roll-up exit gate was on the center field side of the scoreboard. The terrace was shallower there, with a shorter flight of stairs up to Western Avenue.

There was a low fence in front of the left-center stairway (and the flagpole) which led to one of the two posted ground rules. The one on the low fence read, "Batted ball remaining back of barrier - 2 base hit. Bouncing out - in play." In building the new scoreboard for the 1957 season, that corner was reconfigured, eliminating the need for that short barrier and the ground rule. The other, more famous posted ground rule in the right-center field corner above the 387 sign (later 390) read, "Batted ball hitting wall on fly to right of white line - home run."

The Crosley terrace was not as extreme as the terrace at Nashville's Sulphur Dell, but it still frustrated many outfielders, mostly from visiting teams. Babe Ruth was victimized by it on May 28, 1935, playing for the Boston Braves in his final season. He was headed for the Hall of Fame, but one game as Ruth was headed up the Crosley terrace, he fell down on his face. Less dramatically, Yogi Berra had to navigate the terrace on a Frank Robinson double in Game 3 of the 1961 World Series.

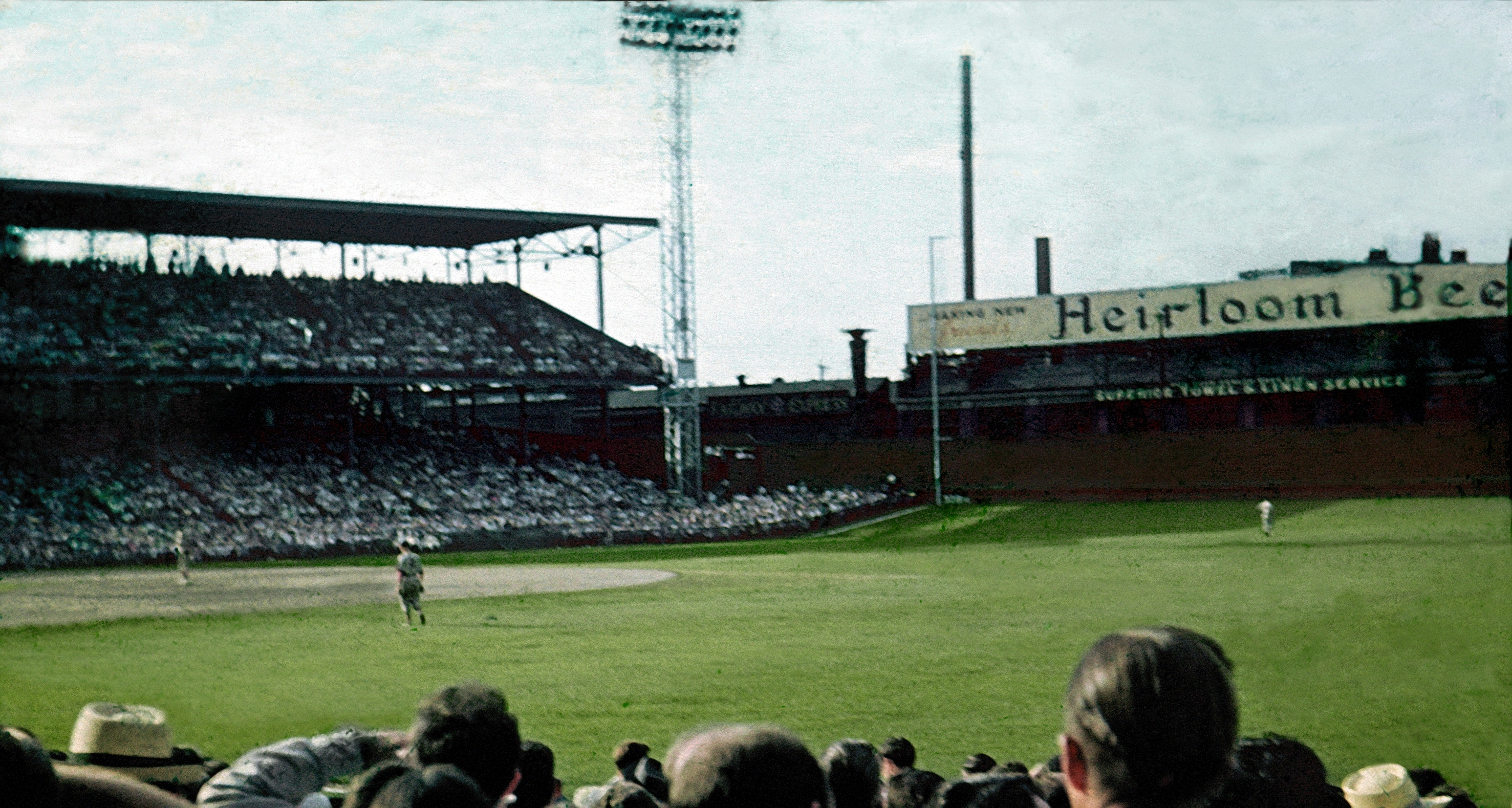
The terrace in 1946.

Frank Robinson, however, loved it. In the early 1990s, when the Baltimore Orioles were planning their future home, Oriole Park at Camden Yards, Robinson, an Orioles executive and one-time Reds star, unsuccessfully lobbied to get the team to install a terrace in left field.

When the Houston Astros' new facility, Enron Field, was being built, a prominent addition to the field was a 30° center field incline with a flagpole, which was dubbed "Tal's Hill" in reference to its proponent, Astros executive Tal Smith. However, it was removed in 2016 and replaced with seating.

To commemorate their Crosley Field years, the main entrance of the Cincinnati Reds' new park, Great American Ball Park, features a monument called "Crosley Terrace" that features inclines and statues of Crosley-era stars Joe Nuxhall, Ernie Lombardi, Ted Kluszewski, and Frank Robinson. References to the terrace are also visible. This monument was designed by architecture firm Populous and sculptor Tom Tsuchiya.

== Other uses ==
Through much of its history, Crosley Field was used for other events besides Cincinnati Reds baseball games. During World War I, the city's police force staged a review at Redland Field on October 17, 1917. The Negro leagues' Cincinnati Tigers in 1936 and 1937 called Crosley home. The original 1937 Cincinnati Bengals football team played home games there.

On August 21, 1966, Crosley Field hosted The Beatles on their final tour. The concert had been scheduled for the previous day, but was rained out. On June 13, 1970, Crosley Field hosted The Cincinnati Pop Festival. The band lineup included: The Stooges, Mountain, Grand Funk Railroad, Alice Cooper, Traffic, Mighty Quick, Bob Seger, Mott The Hoople, Ten Years After, Bloodrock, Savage Grace, Brownsville Station, Zephyr, Damnation Of Adam Blessing, and John Drakes Shakedown.

Other events held there included a Roy Rogers rodeo, a political rally for Wendell Willkie, and an Ice Capades show.

== After the Reds ==
After the 1970 season, the Cincinnati Reds and the city, which had agreed to buy Crosley Field, were at an impasse over how much Crosley Field was worth. The Reds wanted $3.5 million, whereas the city countered with a $1.5 million offer. Eventually the case went to court. The city contended that since Crosley Field's playing field was extremely depressed, it would need to be filled, a costly and time-consuming job, while the Reds countered that since Interstate 75 ran by it, the site would become premium real estate, and they should be fairly compensated for the increase in value.

Eventually, a jury set the sale price at $2.5 million. After the sale was made official, the city turned the park into an auxiliary auto impound lot while the Queensgate project was finalized. Ironically, given the parking shortage for many years, Crosley had itself become a parking lot.

Two years later, the demolition of Crosley Field began in earnest: the lights were dismantled and relocated to various recreation areas in the city. The park was soon gutted; seats sold for $10 each, and fans and present and former club employees scrounged for mementos. On April 19, 1972, Pete Rose Jr. pulled a lever that sent a wrecking ball into the side of Crosley Field. By autumn, just the faint outline of the grandstand remained.

Today, seven buildings occupy the site and a street runs through it. The former site of home plate has been painted in an alley. The old left field terrace area is now a parking lot, but it is still distinguishable due to its slope and its location next to York Street. Dalton Street, which formerly dead-ended into Findlay Street, was extended through the former field of play.

=== Remnants and memorials at the site ===
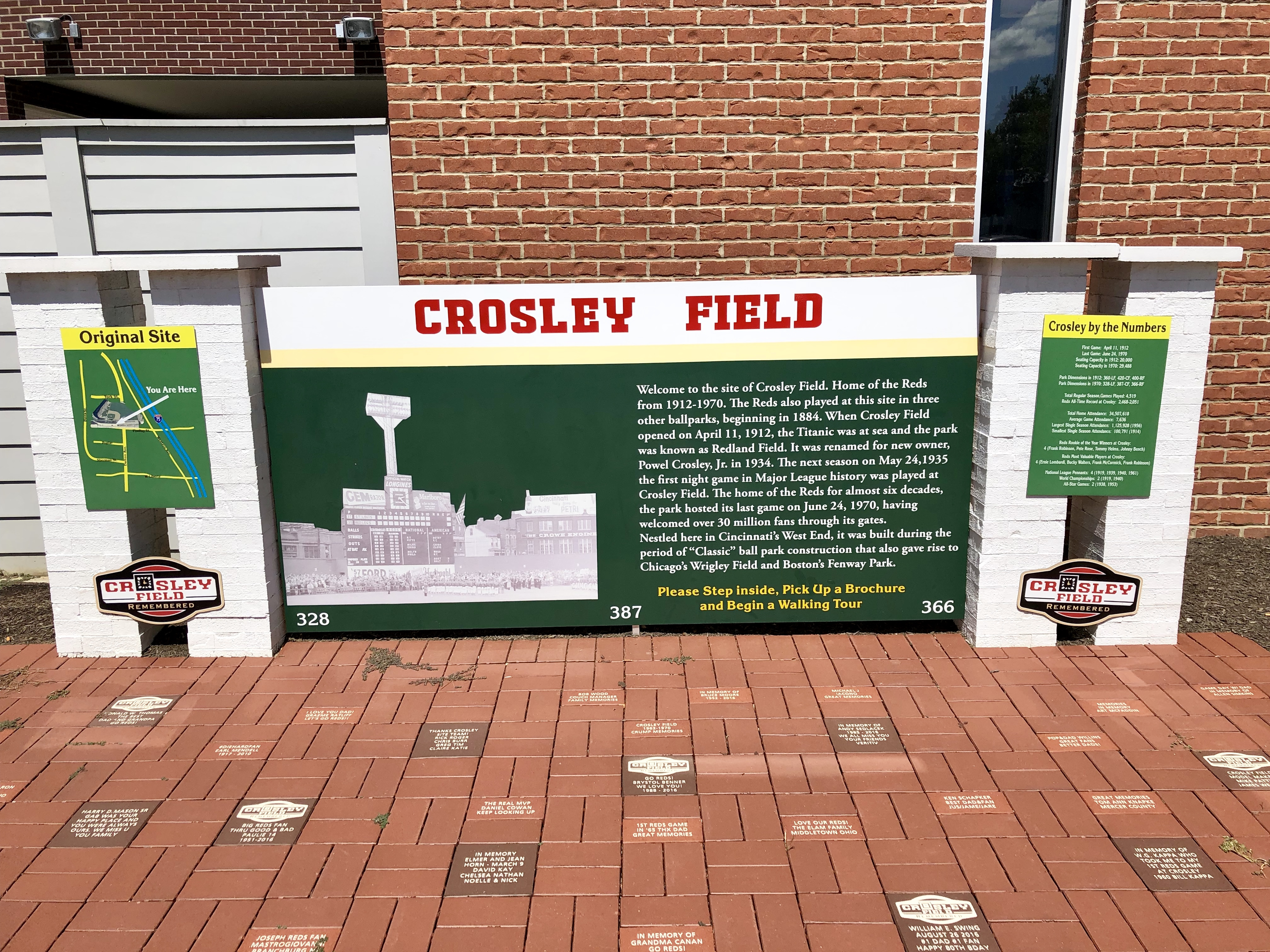
Memorial

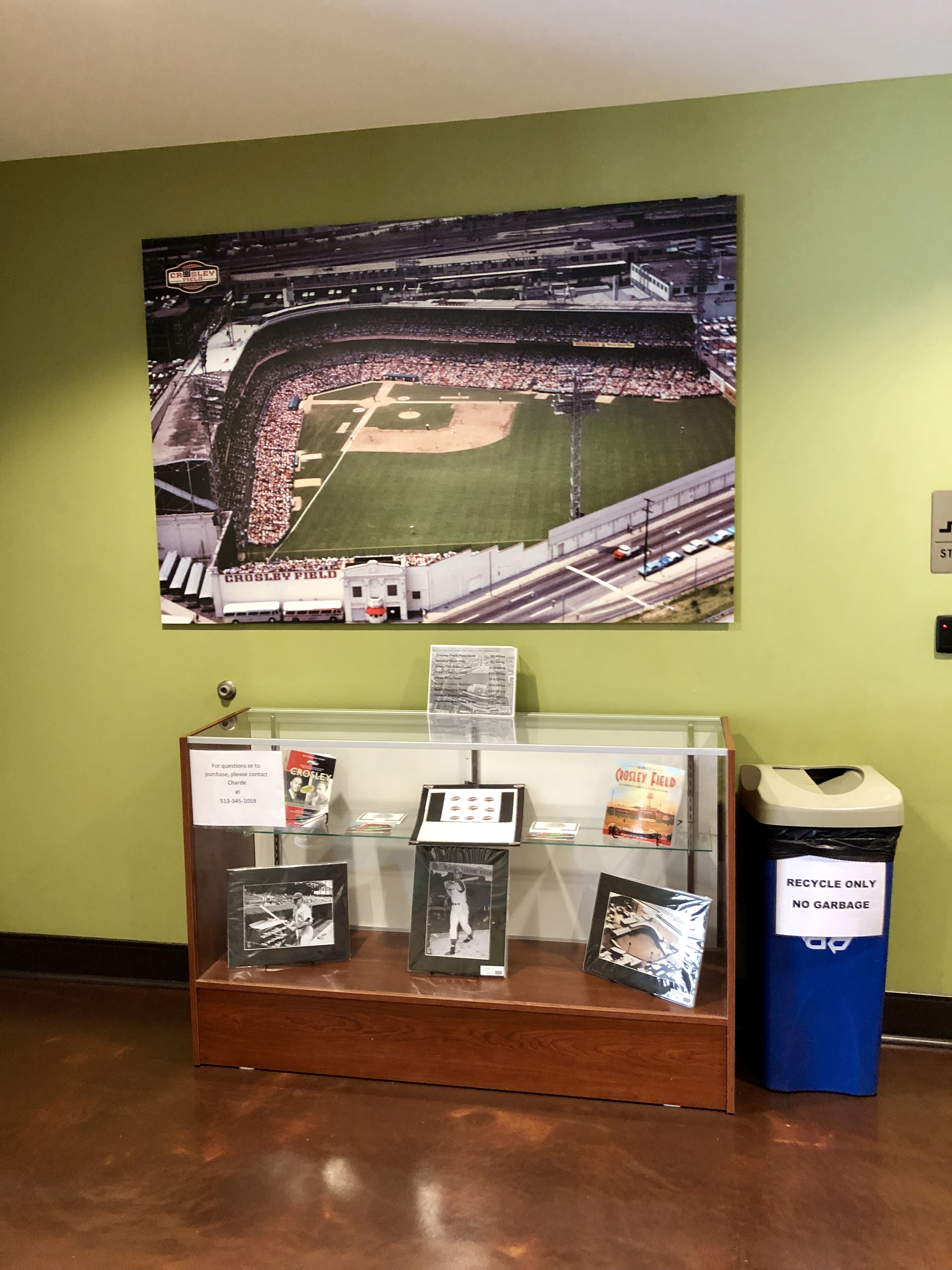
Memorial

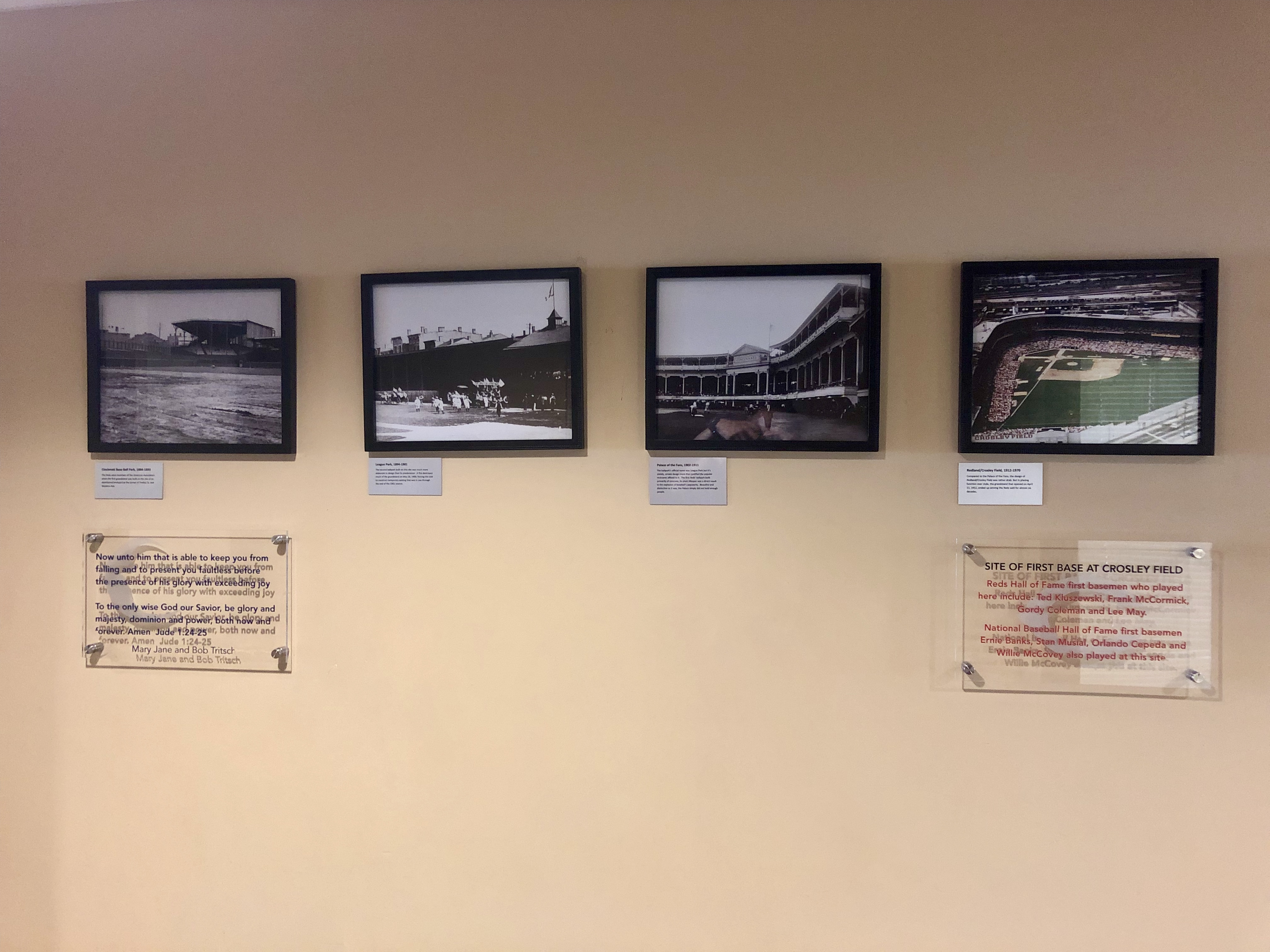
Historical images

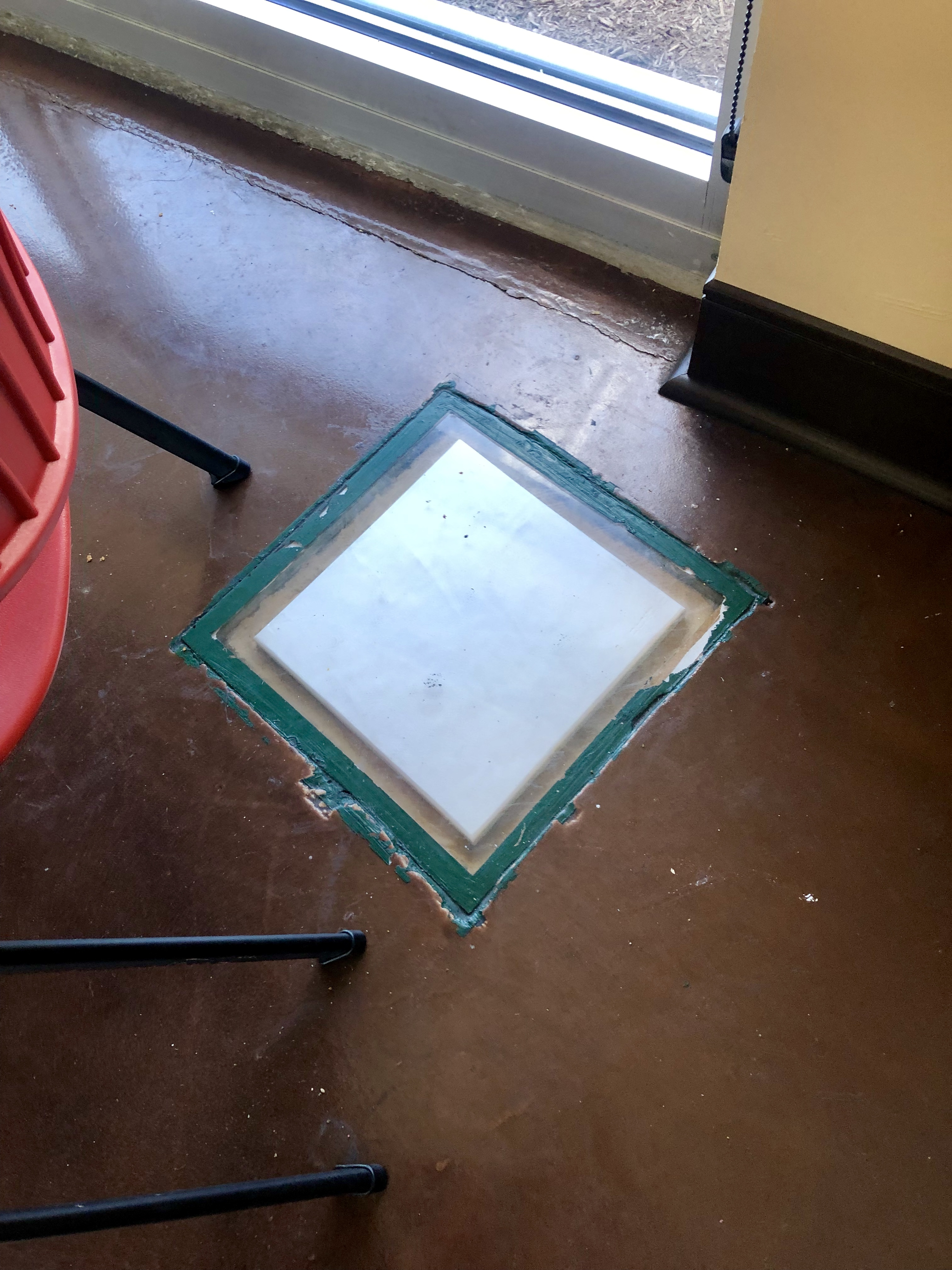
Second base

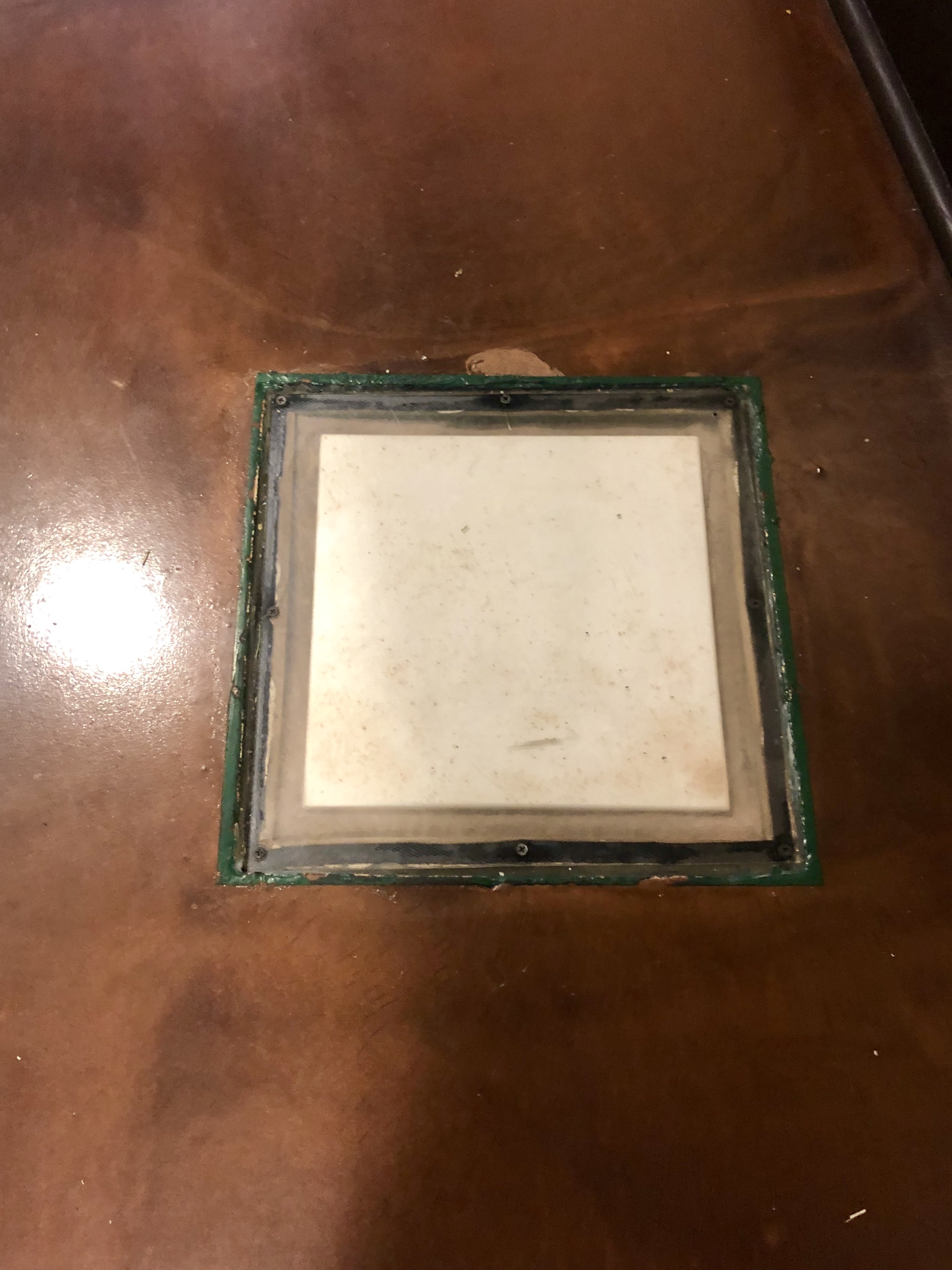
First base

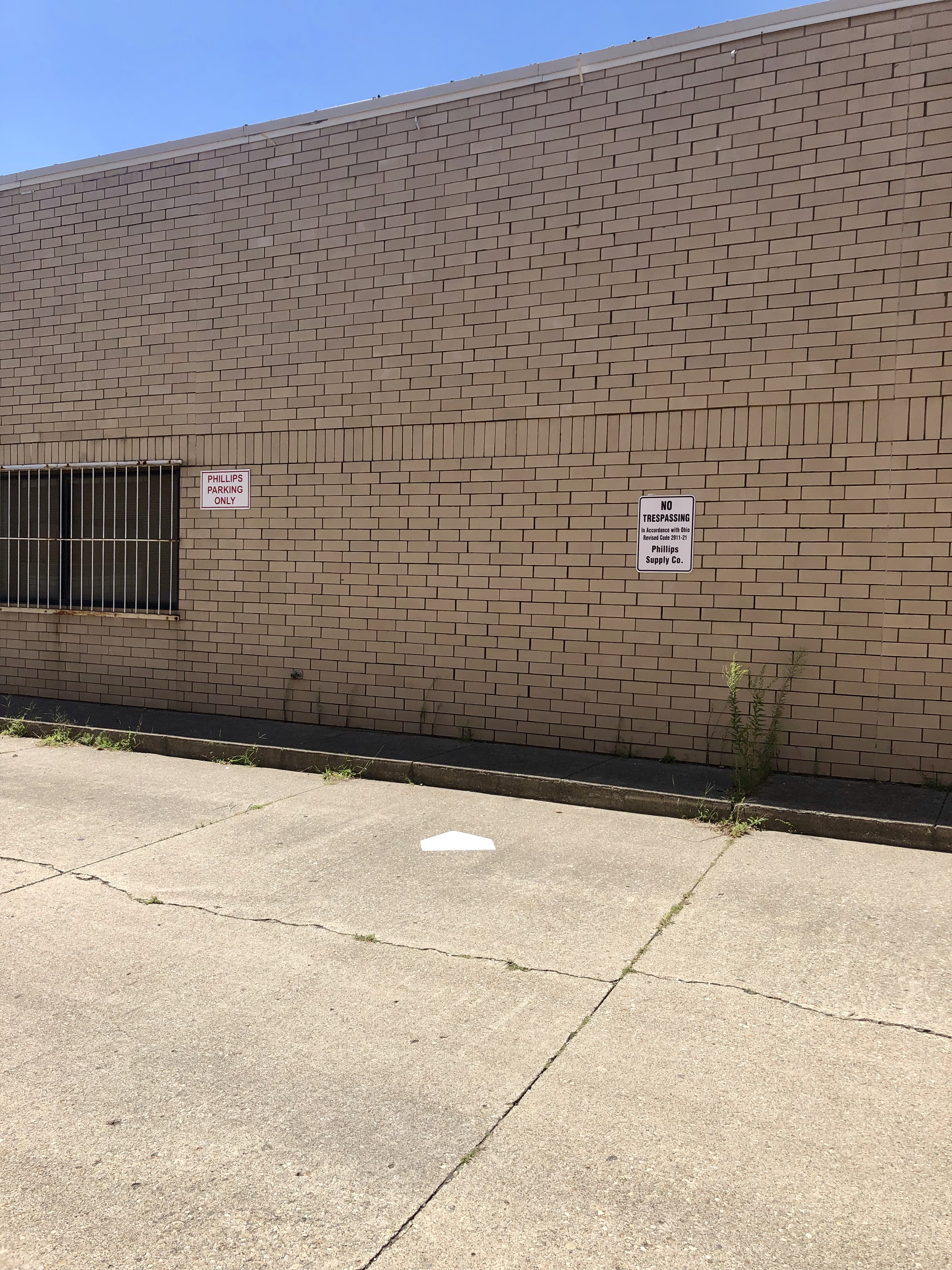
Home plate

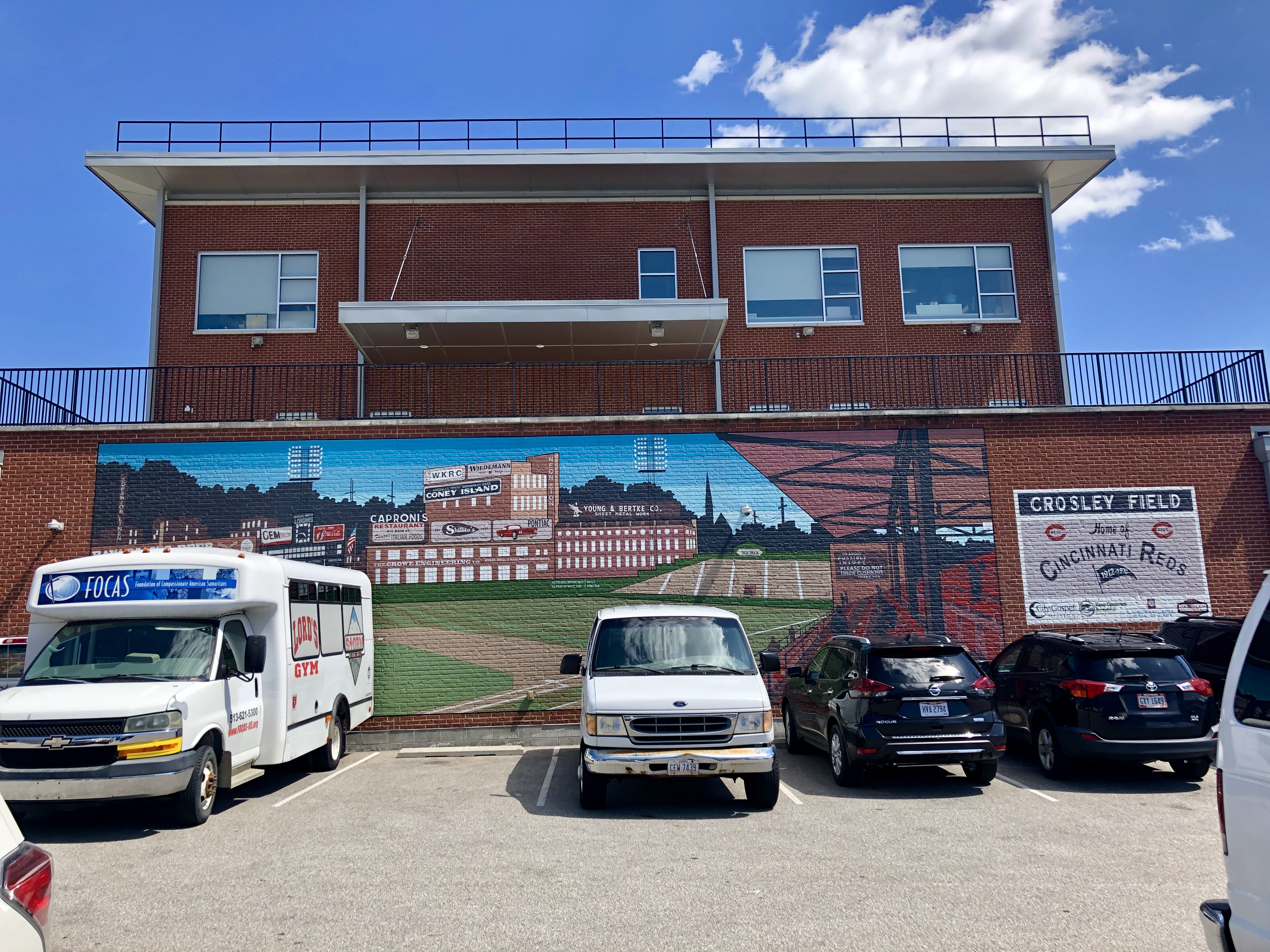
Mural

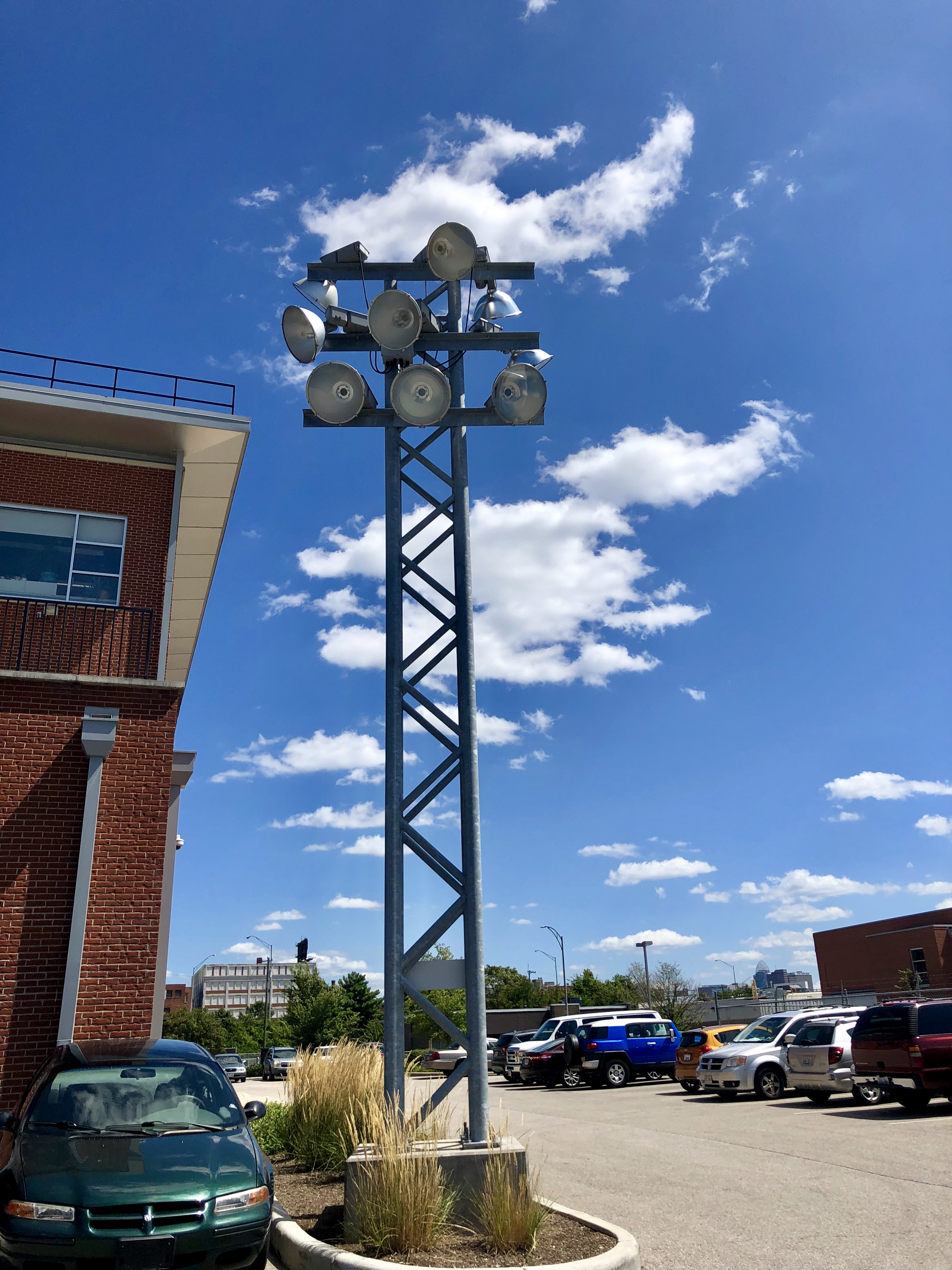
Stadium light post

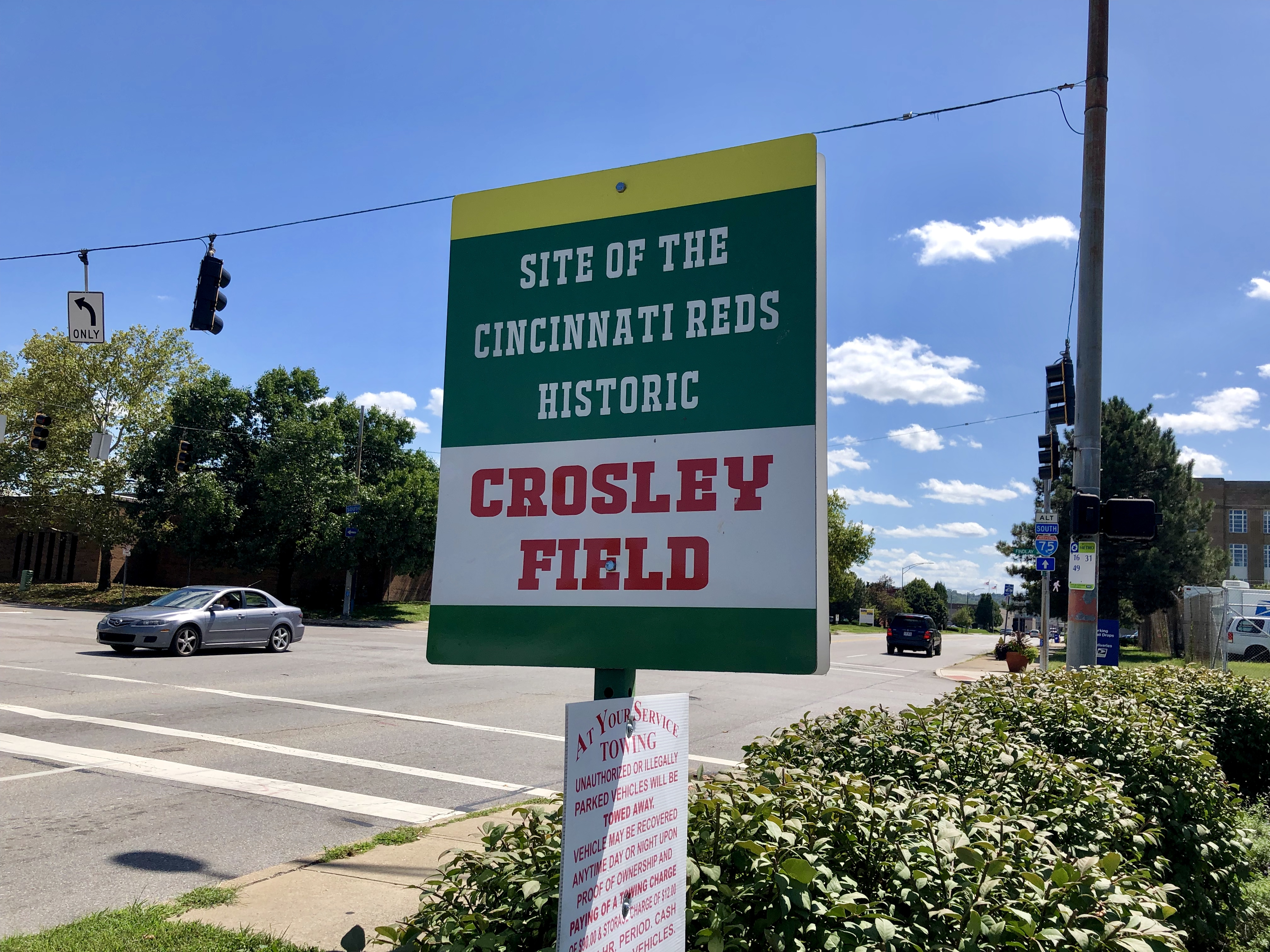
Road sign

== Replica field ==
In 1974, Larry Luebbers of Union, Kentucky, built a replica of the Crosley Field playing field on his farm. To that, he added memorabilia that he had harvested during Crosley's demolition, such as seats, signage, and the old Crosley ticket booth; painted advertising on the fences; and opened it for the Cincinnati Suds professional softball team, which he also owned. However, by 1984, it was gone, too. Luebbers was forced to sell his farm to pay off his creditors. Luebbers' son, Larry Luebbers, played for the Reds and several other clubs in the 1990s.

At about the time Larry Luebbers' Crosley re-creation failed, Marvin Thompson, then city manager Cincinnati suburb Blue Ash, came up with the idea to make one of the ballfields of a planned community sports complex a re-creation of Crosley Field. Administrative aide Mark Rohr was put in charge. He tracked down memorabilia for the park; what he couldn't find was often donated by fans. Items such as usher's uniforms, signage, rooftop pennants, and a field microphone were given to the new project, which opened in 1988 with an Old Timer's game (which has been discontinued). A replica scoreboard carries information from the final game at the old park. The field also has a white wall with "CROSLEY FIELD" in red letters in the appropriate font. This re-creation was met with positive reviews from fans old enough to remember the real park, as well as retired Reds players such as Pete Rose, Joe Nuxhall, and Jim O'Toole. A wall features a number of plaques commemorating Crosley-era Reds greats. Additionally, 400 seats from the original field were installed at the Blue Ash replica.

Rohr, who wasn't a baseball fan when the project began, stated: "Sometimes I have a hard time understanding the people who come and stare at this place with tears in their eyes; a woman actually hugged the ticket booth and kissed it". The field is used regularly by teams in various levels of play. Moeller High School's Varsity Baseball team plays its home games at Crosley.

== Home runs ==
Crosley Field was known as a hitter-friendly park, though it was less so in its early days when the diamond was farther from the fences.

- The first over-the-fence home run struck at Redland/Crosley Field was by outfielder Pat Duncan on June 2, 1921.
- Ernie Lombardi once hit a home run that landed in a truck traveling beyond the outfield fence. The truck carried the ball for 30 miles (48 km). Writers facetiously called this the "longest home run" in history.
- The Goat Run, additional rows of seats which decreased the right field porch from 366 feet (111.5 m) to 342 feet (104.2 m), was added specifically for slugging, sleeveless left-handed batter Ted Kluszewski, presumably to increase his home run total. However, "Klu" rarely hit home runs in the area and it was removed after the 1958 season. Crosley's normal right field layout had the rare element of a foul line farther away (366) than the power alley (360); this meant that balls hit down the right-field line "died" in the corner, with the batter often getting a triple, due to the long distance to third base from right field.
- The scoreboard in left-center field was a major impediment to home-run hitting. At 55 ft (16.8 m) tall, and entirely in play (yellow lines appeared on walls many years later), many hits that would be home runs anywhere else became two-base hits, bouncing back to the outfielder. A sign to the right side of the clock at the very top of the scoreboard offered a free suit from a local tailor to any Reds player to hit the sign. Small consolation for a near miss on a home run.
- On June 10, 1967, Houston outfielder Jimmy Wynn hit a home run to center, onto future I-75. This shot has been portrayed in many films and television shows.

Across the left field wall on York Street, a sign on the Superior Towel and Linen Service plant advertised a downtown clothier, Seibler Suits, which rewarded any player hitting the sign with a suit. Wally Post, who won 11, led the Reds in this unofficial statistical category; Willie Mays led all visitors with seven. Its demolition in the early-1960s netted 38 parking spaces.

== Bibliography ==
- The editors of the Sporting News (1992). Baseball A Doubleheader Collection of Facts, Feats, & Firsts. St. Louis, Mo.: The Sporting News Publishing Co. ISBN 0-88365-785-6..
- Cincinnati's Crosley Field: The Illustrated History of a Classic Ballpark by Greg Rhodes and John Erardi, 1995, Road West Publishing
- Baseball Library.com
- Green Cathedrals, by Phil Lowry, 1992
- Baseball Parks of North America, by Michael Benson, 1989
- The Cincinnati Reds, by Lee Allen, Putnam, 1948.

Events and tenants
Preceded by Palace of the Fans	Home of the Cincinnati Reds; 1912–1970	Succeeded by Riverfront Stadium
Preceded by Griffith Stadium; Shibe Park	Host of the All-Star Game; 1938; 1953	Succeeded by Yankee Stadium; Cleveland Stadium
