= Edward F. Cahill =

American football and basketball coach

Biographical details
- Education: St. Louis U. School of Medicine

Playing career

Football
- c. 1916: Saint Mary (KS)

Coaching career (HC unless noted)

Football
- 1920–1921: Saint John's (MN)
- 1922: Mount St. Charles

Basketball
- 1920–1922: Saint John's (MN)
- 1922–1923: Mount St. Charles

Head coaching record
- Overall: 4–8 (football)

Edward F. Cahill was an American college football and college basketball coach.

== Early years ==
Cahill was a graduate of St. Mary's College in Kansas, where he was a varsity athlete. He enrolled at the Saint Louis University School of Medicine until leaving to serve in World War I.

== Saint John's (Minnesota) ==
Cahill served as the head football and men's basketball coach at Saint John's University in Collegeville, Minnesota during the 1920–21 and 1921–22 academic years.

== Carroll (Montana) ==
Cahill later served as the head football coach and head men's basketball coach at Carroll University (then known as Mount St. Charles College) in Helena, Montana during the 1922-23 academic year.

== Head coaching record ==
=== Football ===
Year	Team	Overall	Conference	Standing	Bowl/playoffs
Saint John's Johnnies (Independent) (1920)
1920	Saint John's	0–2			
Saint John's Johnnies (Minnesota Intercollegiate Athletic Conference) (1921)
1921	Saint John's	1–4	0–2	T–6th	
Saint John's:		1–6	0–2		
Mount St. Charles Saints (Independent) (1922)
1922	Mount St. Charles	3–2			
Mount St. Charles:		3–2			
Total:		4–8			
