= Edward Cahill (pianist) =

Australian pianist

Edward Cahill (1885 – 1975) was an Australian concert pianist. He was born 1885 in Beenleigh, Queensland and died 1975 in Monaco. Highly regarded and widely travelled in his day, his name has since fallen into obscurity. The author Michael Moran, his grand nephew, has written a biography of Cahill, entitled The Pocket Paderewski: The Beguiling Life of the Australian Concert Pianist Edward Cahill (Australian Scholarly Publishing Melbourne 2016).

== Life and career ==
Edward Cahill rose to prominence from modest origins in the inauspicious setting of 19th century rural Queensland. At a time when Australian concert artists were relatively unknown in Europe, he dazzled the salons of royalty, aristocratic patronage and privilege in London, Paris and the French Riviera during the 1920s and 1930s.

His early experiences in the travelling silent cinemas of the Australian outback, alongside music hall and vaudeville performances, provided an unconventional foundation for his career as a concert pianist. Cahill became a protégé of Dame Nellie Melba and performed for kings in Southeast Asia and maharajahs in India. His audiences included Queen Mary in London and the Duke and Duchess of Windsor in Paris. He was also invited for lessons by the pioneering pianist Alfred Cortot and had connections with notable figures such as the conductor Wilhelm Furtwängler, the pianist-statesman Ignacy Paderewski, and the composer Percy Grainger. In London, Cahill was among the first to give recitals featuring the harpsichord, contributing to its modern revival.

Cahill's concert tours in Nazi Germany ended a romance and musical collaboration with the Austrian Jewish violinist Sabine Adler. During World War II, he resided in Switzerland, where he performed charity concerts for interned soldiers. Later, as a resident of South Africa, he took a courageous stand against apartheid, spending his final years in Monaco.

== Reviews ==
- '...this is better than most musical biographies. Moran's portrait of his sometimes enigmatic relative has immediacy and the images of Europe between the wars are vivid.'

(Steven Carroll, Sydney Morning Herald and The Age, 17 February 2017)

- Michael Cathcart on ABC RN produced a 20 minute radio segment on Edward Cahill.

'He [Edward Cahill] witnessed the great events of European history from the Dress Circle. Not just a journey through a man's life but a journey through the twentieth century. Written evocatively and powerfully about music.'
