= George F. Cahill =

- Died: New York City

George F. Cahill (1869–1935) was an American inventor who made night baseball games possible by inventing glareless duplex floodlight projectors.
