= 1943 Cincinnati Reds season =

1943 Cincinnati Reds
- League: National League
- Ballpark: Crosley Field
- City: Cincinnati
- Owners: Powel Crosley Jr.
- General managers: Warren Giles
- Managers: Bill McKechnie
- Radio: WSAI (Roger Baker, Dick Bray); WKRC (Waite Hoyt, Dick Nesbitt)

The 1943 Cincinnati Reds season was a season in American baseball. The team finished second in the National League with a record of 87–67, 18 games behind the St. Louis Cardinals.

== Regular season ==
=== Season standings ===
National League
| Team | W | L | Pct. | GB | Home | Road |
|---|---|---|---|---|---|---|
| St. Louis Cardinals | 105 | 49 | .682 | — | 58‍–‍21 | 47‍–‍28 |
| Cincinnati Reds | 87 | 67 | .565 | 18 | 48‍–‍29 | 39‍–‍38 |
| Brooklyn Dodgers | 81 | 72 | .529 | 23½ | 46‍–‍31 | 35‍–‍41 |
| Pittsburgh Pirates | 80 | 74 | .519 | 25 | 47‍–‍30 | 33‍–‍44 |
| Chicago Cubs | 74 | 79 | .484 | 30½ | 36‍–‍38 | 38‍–‍41 |
| Boston Braves | 68 | 85 | .444 | 36½ | 38‍–‍39 | 30‍–‍46 |
| Philadelphia Phillies | 64 | 90 | .416 | 41 | 33‍–‍43 | 31‍–‍47 |
| New York Giants | 55 | 98 | .359 | 49½ | 34‍–‍43 | 21‍–‍55 |

=== Record vs. opponents ===
1943 National League record Sources:
| Team | BSN | BRO | CHC | CIN | NYG | PHI | PIT | STL |
|---|---|---|---|---|---|---|---|---|
| Boston | — | 12–9 | 8–14 | 11–11 | 11–11 | 11–11 | 12–10 | 3–19 |
| Brooklyn | 9–12 | — | 10–12 | 13–9 | 14–8 | 17–5 | 11–11 | 7–15 |
| Chicago | 14–8 | 12–10 | — | 9–13 | 12–9–1 | 10–12 | 8–14 | 9–13 |
| Cincinnati | 11–11 | 9–13 | 13–9 | — | 16–6–1 | 19–3 | 9–13 | 10–12 |
| New York | 11–11 | 8–14 | 9–12–1 | 6–16–1 | — | 8–14–1 | 9–13 | 4–18 |
| Philadelphia | 11–11 | 5–17 | 12–10 | 3–19 | 14–8–1 | — | 10–12–1 | 9–13–1 |
| Pittsburgh | 10–12 | 11–11 | 14–8 | 13–9 | 13–9 | 12–10–1 | — | 7–15–2 |
| St. Louis | 19–3 | 15–7 | 13–9 | 12–10 | 18–4 | 13–9–1 | 15–7–2 | — |

=== Roster ===
1943 Cincinnati Reds
Roster
| Pitchers: 43 Joe Beggs; 34 Ed Heusser; 38 Bob Malloy; 29 Jack Niemes; 41 Elmer Riddle; 35 Clyde Shoun; 37 Ray Starr; 39 Rocky Stone; 33 Johnny Vander Meer; 31 Bucky Walters | Catchers: 6 Tony DePhillips; 4 Al Lakeman; 7 Ray Mueller; Infielders: 19 Charlie Brewster; 11 Lonny Frey; 22 Lonnie Goldstein; 18 Bert Haas; 10 Frank McCormick; 16 Steve Mesner; 15 Eddie Miller; 17 Woody Williams | Outfielders: 28 Chuck Aleno; 20 Dain Clay; 3 Estel Crabtree; 22 Frankie Kelleher; 21 Max Marshall; 20 Mike McCormick; 23 Eric Tipton; 27 Gee Walker; Other batters: 5 Dick West | Manager: 1 Bill McKechnie; Coaches: 3 Estel Crabtree; 2 Hans Lobert |

== Player stats ==
=== Batting ===
==== Starters by position ====
Note: Pos = Position; G = Games played; AB = At bats; H = Hits; Avg. = Batting average; HR = Home runs; RBI = Runs batted in

| Pos | Player | G | AB | H | Avg. | HR | RBI |
|---|---|---|---|---|---|---|---|
| C | Ray Mueller | 141 | 427 | 111 | .260 | 8 | 52 |
| 1B | Frank McCormick | 126 | 472 | 143 | .303 | 8 | 59 |
| 2B | Lonny Frey | 144 | 586 | 154 | .263 | 2 | 43 |
| SS | Eddie Miller | 154 | 576 | 129 | .224 | 2 | 71 |
| 3B | Steve Mesner | 137 | 504 | 137 | .272 | 0 | 52 |
| OF | Max Marshall | 132 | 508 | 120 | .236 | 4 | 39 |
| OF | Eric Tipton | 140 | 493 | 142 | .288 | 9 | 49 |
| OF | Gee Walker | 114 | 429 | 105 | .245 | 3 | 54 |

==== Other batters ====
Note: G = Games played; AB = At bats; H = Hits; Avg. = Batting average; HR = Home runs; RBI = Runs batted in

| Player | G | AB | H | Avg. | HR | RBI |
|---|---|---|---|---|---|---|
| Bert Haas | 101 | 332 | 87 | .262 | 4 | 44 |
| Estel Crabtree | 95 | 254 | 70 | .276 | 2 | 26 |
| Dain Clay | 49 | 93 | 25 | .269 | 0 | 9 |
| Woody Williams | 30 | 69 | 26 | .377 | 0 | 11 |
| Al Lakeman | 22 | 55 | 14 | .255 | 0 | 6 |
| Tony DePhillips | 35 | 20 | 2 | .100 | 0 | 2 |
| Mike McCormick | 4 | 15 | 2 | .133 | 0 | 0 |
| Chuck Aleno | 7 | 10 | 3 | .300 | 0 | 1 |
| Charlie Brewster | 7 | 8 | 1 | .125 | 0 | 0 |
| Lon Goldstein | 5 | 5 | 1 | .200 | 0 | 0 |
| Dick West | 3 | 0 | 0 | ---- | 0 | 0 |

=== Pitching ===
==== Starting pitchers ====
Note: G = Games pitched; IP = Innings pitched; W = Wins; L = Losses; ERA = Earned run average; SO = Strikeouts

| Player | G | IP | W | L | ERA | SO |
|---|---|---|---|---|---|---|
| Johnny Vander Meer | 36 | 289.0 | 15 | 16 | 2.87 | 174 |
| Elmer Riddle | 36 | 260.1 | 21 | 11 | 2.63 | 69 |
| Bucky Walters | 34 | 246.1 | 15 | 15 | 3.54 | 80 |
| Ray Starr | 36 | 217.1 | 11 | 10 | 3.64 | 42 |

==== Other pitchers ====
Note: G = Games pitched; IP = Innings pitched; W = Wins; L = Losses; ERA = Earned run average; SO = Strikeouts

| Player | G | IP | W | L | ERA | SO |
|---|---|---|---|---|---|---|
| Ed Heusser | 26 | 91.0 | 4 | 3 | 3.46 | 28 |

==== Relief pitchers ====
Note: G = Games pitched; W = Wins; L = Losses; SV = Saves; ERA = Earned run average; SO = Strikeouts

| Player | G | W | L | SV | ERA | SO |
|---|---|---|---|---|---|---|
| Clyde Shoun | 45 | 14 | 5 | 7 | 3.06 | 61 |
| Joe Beggs | 39 | 7 | 6 | 6 | 2.34 | 28 |
| Rocky Stone | 13 | 0 | 1 | 0 | 4.38 | 11 |
| Bob Malloy | 6 | 0 | 0 | 0 | 6.30 | 4 |
| Jack Niemes | 3 | 0 | 0 | 0 | 6.00 | 1 |

== Farm system ==
| Level | Team | League | Manager |
|---|---|---|---|
| AA | Syracuse Chiefs | International League | Jewel Ens |
| A1 | Birmingham Barons | Southern Association | Johnny Riddle |

LEAGUE CHAMPIONS: Syracuse
