= 1943 Boston Braves season =

1943 Boston Braves
- League: National League
- Ballpark: Braves Field
- City: Boston, Massachusetts
- Record: 68–85 (.444)
- League place: 6th
- Owners: J.A. Robert Quinn
- Managers: Casey Stengel, Bob Coleman
- Radio: WNAC (George Hartrick, Tom Hussey)

The 1943 Boston Braves season was the 73rd season of the franchise. The Braves finished sixth in the National League with a record of 68 wins and 85 losses.

== Regular season ==
=== Season standings ===
National League
Team	W	L	Pct.	GB	Home	Road
St. Louis Cardinals	105	49	.682	—	58‍–‍21	47‍–‍28
Cincinnati Reds	87	67	.565	18	48‍–‍29	39‍–‍38
Brooklyn Dodgers	81	72	.529	23½	46‍–‍31	35‍–‍41
Pittsburgh Pirates	80	74	.519	25	47‍–‍30	33‍–‍44
Chicago Cubs	74	79	.484	30½	36‍–‍38	38‍–‍41
Boston Braves	68	85	.444	36½	38‍–‍39	30‍–‍46
Philadelphia Phillies	64	90	.416	41	33‍–‍43	31‍–‍47
New York Giants	55	98	.359	49½	34‍–‍43	21‍–‍55

=== Record vs. opponents ===
1943 National League record Sources:
Team	BSN	BRO	CHC	CIN	NYG	PHI	PIT	STL
Boston	—	12–9	8–14	11–11	11–11	11–11	12–10	3–19
Brooklyn	9–12	—	10–12	13–9	14–8	17–5	11–11	7–15
Chicago	14–8	12–10	—	9–13	12–9–1	10–12	8–14	9–13
Cincinnati	11–11	9–13	13–9	—	16–6–1	19–3	9–13	10–12
New York	11–11	8–14	9–12–1	6–16–1	—	8–14–1	9–13	4–18
Philadelphia	11–11	5–17	12–10	3–19	14–8–1	—	10–12–1	9–13–1
Pittsburgh	10–12	11–11	14–8	13–9	13–9	12–10–1	—	7–15–2
St. Louis	19–3	15–7	13–9	12–10	18–4	13–9–1	15–7–2	—

=== Notable transactions ===
- April 18, 1943: Dave Odom was signed as a free agent by the Braves.
- July 19, 1943: Tony Cuccinello was released by the Braves.

=== Roster ===
1943 Boston Braves
Roster
Pitchers: 25 Nate Andrews; 19 Red Barrett; 26 Ben Cardoni; -- John Dagenhard; 20 George Diehl; 21 Bill Donovan; 18 Al Javery; 26 George Jeffcoat; -- Carl Lindquist; 36 Danny MacFayden; 35 Ray Martin; 34 Dave Odom; 24 Manny Salvo; 36 Allyn Stout; -- Roy Talcott; 22 Jim Tobin; 27 Lou Tost	Catchers: 12 Clyde Kluttz; 10 Phil Masi; 5,16 Hugh Poland; Infielders: 11 Bill Brubaker; 14 Joe Burns; 15 Tony Cuccinello; -- Buck Etchison; 9 Kerby Farrell; 8 Ben Geraghty; 8 Heinie Heltzel; 2 Eddie Joost; 3 Johnny McCarthy; 30,42 Connie Ryan; 7 Whitey Wietelmann	Outfielders: 1 Tommy Holmes; 29 Butch Nieman; 6 Chet Ross; 4 Chuck Workman; Other batters: 17 Connie Creeden; 35 Sam Gentile	Manager: 31 Bob Coleman; 32 Casey Stengel; Coaches: 31 Bob Coleman; 33 George Kelly

== Player stats ==
=== Batting ===
==== Starters by position ====
Note: Pos = Position; G = Games played; AB = At bats; H = Hits; Avg. = Batting average; HR = Home runs; RBI = Runs batted in

Pos	Player	G	AB	H	Avg.	HR	RBI
C	Phil Masi	80	238	65	.273	2	28
1B	Johnny McCarthy	78	313	95	.304	2	33
2B	Connie Ryan	132	457	97	.212	1	24
SS	Whitey Wietelmann	153	534	115	.215	0	39
3B	Eddie Joost	124	421	78	.185	2	20
OF	Chuck Workman	153	615	153	.249	10	67
OF	Tommy Holmes	152	629	170	.270	5	41
OF	Butch Nieman	101	335	84	.251	7	46

==== Other batters ====
Note: G = Games played; AB = At bats; H = Hits; Avg. = Batting average; HR = Home runs; RBI = Runs batted in

Player	G	AB	H	Avg.	HR	RBI
Chet Ross	94	285	62	.218	7	32
Kerby Farrell	85	280	75	.268	0	21
Clyde Kluttz	66	207	51	.246	0	20
Hugh Poland	44	141	27	.191	0	13
Joe Burns	52	135	28	.207	1	5
Heinie Heltzel	29	86	13	.151	0	5
Tony Cuccinello	13	19	0	.000	0	2
Buck Etchison	10	19	6	.316	0	2
Bill Brubaker	13	19	8	.421	0	1
Sam Gentile	8	4	1	.250	0	0
Connie Creeden	5	4	1	.250	0	1
Ben Geraghty	8	1	0	.000	0	0

=== Pitching ===
==== Starting pitchers ====
Note: G = Games pitched; IP = Innings pitched; W = Wins; L = Losses; ERA = Earned run average; SO = Strikeouts

Player	G	IP	W	L	ERA	SO
Al Javery	41	303.0	17	16	3.21	134
Nate Andrews	36	283.2	14	20	2.57	80
Red Barrett	38	255.0	12	18	3.18	64
Jim Tobin	33	250.0	14	14	2.66	52
Carl Lindquist	2	13.0	0	2	6.23	1

==== Other pitchers ====
Note: G = Games pitched; IP = Innings pitched; W = Wins; L = Losses; ERA = Earned run average; SO = Strikeouts

Player	G	IP	W	L	ERA	SO
Manny Salvo	21	98.2	5	7	3.47	26
George Jeffcoat	8	17.2	1	2	3.06	10
John Dagenhard	2	11.0	1	0	0.00	2
Lou Tost	3	6.2	0	1	5.40	3

==== Relief pitchers ====
Note: G = Games pitched; W = Wins; L = Losses; SV = Saves; ERA = Earned run average; SO = Strikeouts

Player	G	W	L	SV	ERA	SO
Dave Odom	23	0	3	2	5.27	17
Ben Cardoni	11	0	0	1	6.43	5
Danny MacFayden	10	2	1	0	5.91	5
Allyn Stout	9	1	0	1	6.75	3
Bill Donovan	7	1	0	0	1.84	1
Kerby Farrell	5	0	1	0	4.30	4
Ray Martin	2	0	0	0	8.10	1
George Diehl	1	0	0	0	4.50	1
Roy Talcott	1	0	0	0	27.00	0

== Farm system ==
Level	Team	League	Manager
A	Hartford Bees	Eastern League	Del Bissonette
