= Charlie Brewster =

American baseball player (1916–2000)

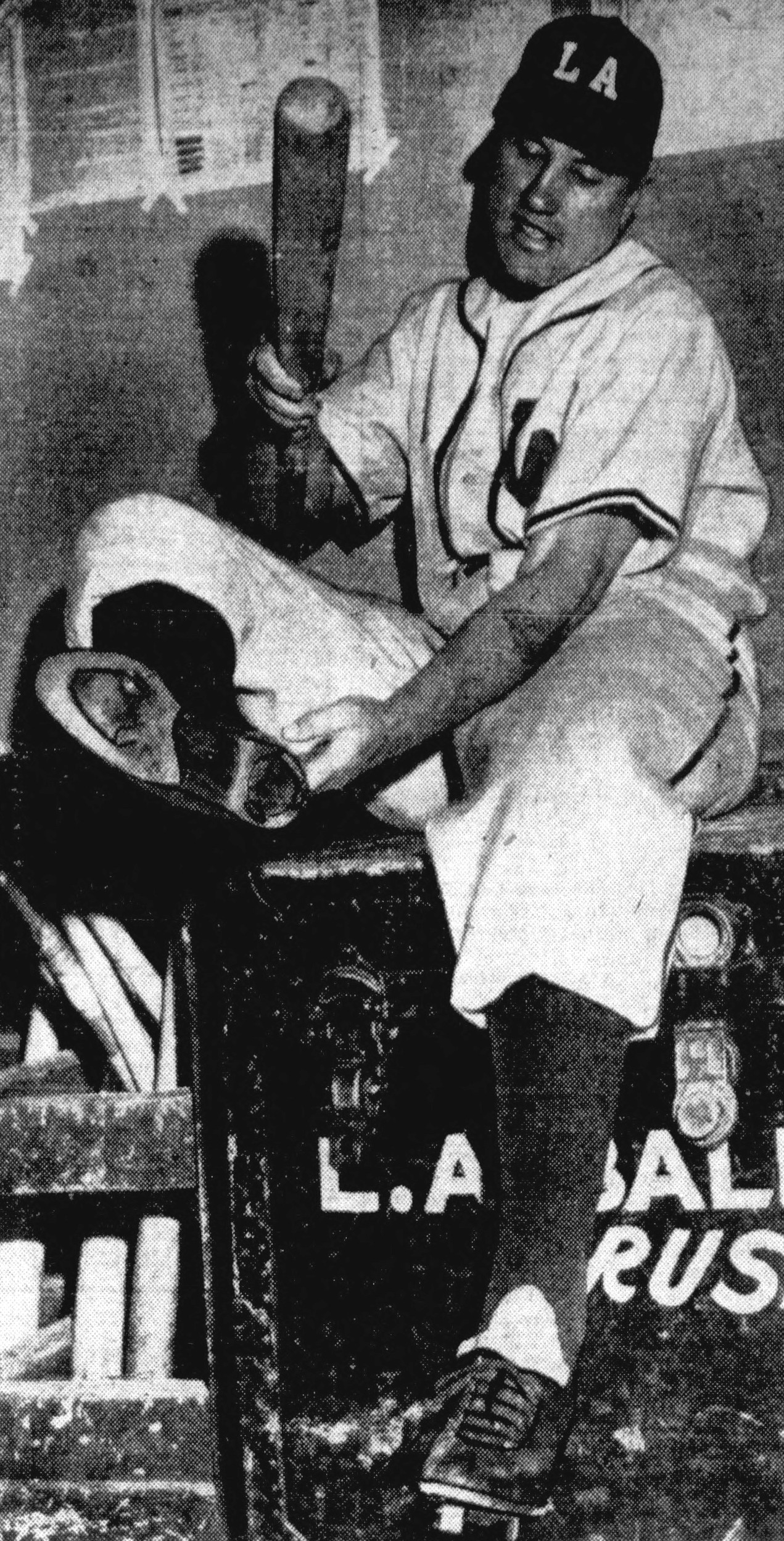
- Brewster, circa 1945
- Shortstop
- Born: December 27, 1916; Marthaville, Louisiana, U.S.
- Died: October 1, 2000 (aged 83); Alma, Georgia, U.S.
- Batted: Right Threw: Right

MLB debut
- May 2, 1943, for the Cincinnati Reds

Last MLB appearance
- May 29, 1946, for the Cleveland Indians

MLB statistics
- Batting average: .221
- Fielding percentage: .904
- Runs batted in: 14
- Stats at Baseball Reference

Teams
- Cincinnati Reds (1943); Philadelphia Phillies (1943); Chicago Cubs (1944); Cleveland Indians (1946)

Charles Lawrence Brewster (December 27, 1916 – October 1, 2000) was an American right-handed shortstop in Major League Baseball for the Chicago Cubs, Cincinnati Reds, Philadelphia Phillies, and Cleveland Indians. He also made two appearances as a second baseman in his brief career.

== Early life and minor leagues ==
Brewster played college baseball at Southern Arkansas University. His minor league career began with the Class-D Abbeville A's in 1936. He gradually moved his way up the minor league ranks, and throughout the war years spent most of his time with the Nashville Sounds.

== Cincinnati ==
Cincinnati originally obtained Brewster through the Rule 5 Draft, selecting him from a Milwaukee minor league team in 1942. He debuted with the Reds on May 2, 1943, going 1-for-8 at the plate in seven games with the club. Cincinnati quickly traded Brewster to the Phillies on June 6 in exchange for Dain Clay.

== Philadelphia ==
With Philadelphia, Brewster found a job as a shortstop, platooning with Glen Stewart. His bat was light, however; in 49 games he hit just .220 and managed only two extra-base hits (both doubles) and 12 RBI.

== Chicago and Cleveland ==
Brewster surfaced with the Cubs in 1944, appearing in ten games and hitting .250 (11-for-44) with two doubles and 2 RBI. After going missing from the major leagues for a year, he had a brief stint with Cleveland in 1946, going 0-for-2 in three games. His final major league appearance was on May 29, 1946, and he played in the minor leagues until his retirement in 1954. Brewster died on October 1, 2000, in Alma, Georgia.
