= Rocky Stone =

American baseball player (1918–1986)

- Pitcher
- Born: August 23, 1918; Redding, California, U.S.
- Died: November 12, 1986 (aged 68); Fountain Valley, California, U.S.
- Batted: Right Threw: Right

MLB debut
- May 2, 1943, for the Cincinnati Reds

Last MLB appearance
- June 30, 1943, for the Cincinnati Reds

MLB statistics
- Win–loss record: 0–1
- Earned run average: 4.38
- Strikeouts: 11
- Stats at Baseball Reference

Teams
- Cincinnati Reds (1943)

John Vernon "Rocky" Stone (August 23, 1918 – November 12, 1986) was an American Major League Baseball pitcher. Stone played for the Cincinnati Reds in 1943. In 13 career games, he had a 0–1 record, with a 4.38 ERA. He batted and threw right-handed.

Stone's only decision came on June 5 against the Boston Braves at Crosley Field. After pitching 3 innings of scoreless relief, he surrendered 2 runs in the top of the ninth inning; the Reds could not rally in their half of the inning leading to the 7–5 loss.

Stone was born in Redding, California, and died in Fountain Valley, California.
