= Steve Mesner =

American baseball player (1918–1981)

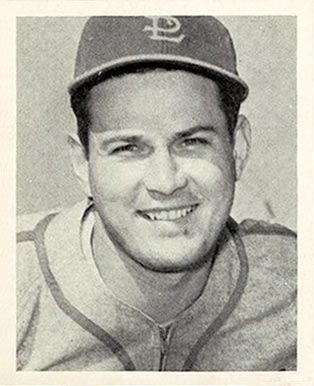
- Third baseman
- Born: January 13, 1918; Los Angeles, California, U.S.
- Died: April 6, 1981 (aged 63); San Diego, California, U.S.
- Batted: Right Threw: Right

MLB debut
- September 23, 1938, for the Chicago Cubs

Last MLB appearance
- September 30, 1945, for the Cincinnati Reds

MLB statistics
- Batting average: .252
- Home runs: 2
- Runs batted in: 167
- Stats at Baseball Reference

Teams
- Chicago Cubs (1938–1939); St. Louis Cardinals (1941); Cincinnati Reds (1943–1945)

Stephen Mathias Mesner (January 13, 1918 – April 6, 1981) was a professional baseball player who was a third baseman in the Major Leagues at various times between 1938 and 1945. He played for the Chicago Cubs, St. Louis Cardinals, and Cincinnati Reds. He was also a long-time player in the minor leagues, cracking the lineup of the Los Angeles Angels of the Pacific Coast League at age 16 in 1934, and attaining starting status the following year. Mesner amassed 2,965 base hits in 21 seasons between the majors and minors.
