= Ben Cardoni =

American baseball player (1920-1969)

- Pitcher
- Born: August 21, 1920; Jessup, Pennsylvania, U.S.
- Died: April 2, 1969 (aged 48); Jessup, Pennsylvania, U.S.
- Batted: Right Threw: Right

MLB debut
- August 22, 1943, for the Boston Braves

Last MLB appearance
- September 30, 1945, for the Boston Braves

MLB statistics
- Win–loss record: 0–6
- Earned run average: 4.76
- Strikeouts: 34
- Stats at Baseball Reference

Teams
- Boston Braves (1943–1945)

Armand Joseph "Big Ben" Cardoni (August 21, 1920 – April 2, 1969) was an American Major League Baseball pitcher. He played three seasons with the Boston Braves from 1943 to 1945.
