= Heinie Heltzel =

American baseball player (1913-1998)

- Third baseman, shortstop
- Born: December 21, 1913; York, Pennsylvania, U.S.
- Died: May 1, 1998 (aged 84); York, Pennsylvania, U.S.
- Batted: Right Threw: Right

MLB debut
- July 23, 1943, for the Boston Braves

Last MLB appearance
- August 6, 1944, for the Philadelphia Phillies

MLB statistics
- Batting average: .157
- Home runs: 0
- Runs batted in: 5
- Stats at Baseball Reference

Teams
- Boston Braves (1943); Philadelphia Phillies (1944)

William Wade "Heinie" Heltzel (December 21, 1913 – May 1, 1998) was an American baseball player. He played professional baseball as a shortstop and third baseman from 1935 to 1947, including stints with the Boston Braves in 1943 and the Philadelphia Phillies in 1944.

== Biography ==
Heltzel was born in 1913 in York, Pennsylvania.

He began playing professional baseball in 1935 with the Harrisburg Senators of the New York–Penn League. Over the next eight seasons, he continued in the minor leagues, playing for the Trenton Senators (1936-37), Greenville Spinners (1938), Montgomery Rebels (1938), Orlando Senators (1939), Reading Chicks (1940-41), Bridgeport Bees (1941), and Hartford Bees (1942-43).

In 1943, Heltzel made his major league debut on July 27, 1943, with the Boston Braves. He appeared in twenty-nine games with the Braves during the 1940 season. He had thirteen hits and seven walks, scored six runs, and tallied five RBIs, eighteen putouts, forty-eight assists, and nine errors.

In 1944, he appeared in eleven games for the Philadelphia Phillies.

He appeared in his final major league game on August 6, 1944. His career fielding percentage in twenty-nine games at third base was .880 – 68 points below the league average of .948 for third basemen during the years he played.

Heltzel continued to play in the minor leagues for the Indianapolis Indians (1944-45), Seattle Rainiers (1946), and York White Roses (1946-47).

== Death ==
In May 1998, Heltzel died at the age of eighty-three in York, Pennsylvania.
