= Jack Niemes =

American baseball player (1919–1966)

- Pitcher
- Born: October 19, 1919; Cincinnati, Ohio
- Died: March 4, 1966 (aged 46); Hamilton, Ohio
- Batted: Right Threw: Left

MLB debut
- May 30, 1943, for the Cincinnati Reds

Last MLB appearance
- September 11, 1943, for the Cincinnati Reds

MLB statistics
- Games pitched: 3
- Win–loss record: 0–0
- Earned run average: 6.00
- Strikeouts: 1
- Stats at Baseball Reference

Teams
- Cincinnati Reds (1943)

Jacob Leland Niemes (October 19, 1919 – March 4, 1966) was a professional baseball player. He was a left-handed pitcher for one season (1943) with the Cincinnati Reds. For his career, he pitched in three games and recorded no decisions, with a 6.00 earned run average, and 1 strikeout in three innings pitched.

An alumnus of the University of Cincinnati, he was born in Cincinnati, Ohio, and later died in Hamilton, Ohio, at the age of 46.
