= Lonnie Goldstein =

American baseball player (1918–2013)

- First baseman
- Born: May 13, 1918; Austin, Texas, U.S.
- Died: January 28, 2013 (aged 94); Fort Worth, Texas, U.S.
- Batted: Left Threw: Left

MLB debut
- September 11, 1943, for the Cincinnati Reds

Last MLB appearance
- September 27, 1946, for the Cincinnati Reds

MLB statistics
- Batting average: .100
- Home runs: 0
- Runs batted in: 0
- Stats at Baseball Reference

Teams
- Cincinnati Reds (1943, 1946)

Leslie Elmer Goldstein (May 13, 1918 – January 28, 2013) was an American first baseman in Major League Baseball who played briefly for the Cincinnati Reds during the 1943 and 1946 seasons. He batted and threw left-handed.

A native of Austin, Texas, Goldstein was one of many major leaguers who saw his baseball career interrupted by a military stint during World War II. In 1943 he appeared in five games as a backup for first baseman Frank McCormick. He enrolled in the United States Army in 1944, serving for two and half years before rejoining the Reds in the 1946 midseason as a reserve player and pinch hitter.

In a two-season career, Goldstein was a .100 hitter (1-for-10) with a run scored and a .308 on-base percentage in 11 games.

Goldstein died on January 28, 2013, at the age of 94.
