= Tony DePhillips =

American baseball player (1912–1994)

- DePhillips with the Cincinnati Reds in 1943
- Catcher
- Born: September 20, 1912; New York City, US
- Died: May 5, 1994 (aged 81); Port Jefferson, New York, US
- Batted: Right Threw: Right

MLB debut
- April 25, 1943, for the Cincinnati Reds

Last MLB appearance
- September 12, 1943, for the Cincinnati Reds

MLB statistics
- Batting average: .100
- Home runs: 0
- Runs batted in: 2
- Stats at Baseball Reference

Teams
- Cincinnati Reds (1943)

Anthony Andrew DePhillips (September 20, 1912 – May 5, 1994) was an American Major League Baseball (MLB) catcher with the Cincinnati Reds. He played in 35 games, all during the 1943 season.

== Biography ==
DePhillips was born in New York, New York, and attended Fordham University. For his career, he compiled a .100 batting average in 20 at-bats, with two runs batted in.

DePhillips was a standout basketball and baseball player at Newtown High School and at Fordham University. He played minor league baseball for the New York Yankees and played in the Major Leagues. In 1942, DePhillips voluntarily retired in order to spend more time with his wife and baby, Tony, Jr. He accepted a job in October of that year coaching college basketball at the Pratt Institute in addition to his job coaching high school basketball at St. Simon Stock High School in the Bronx.

After retiring in 1942, he played for an amateur team in New York called the Bushwicks. In March 1943, he signed with the Cincinnati Reds. With the Reds, he had a reputation as a defensively gifted but offensively challenged catcher. As a result, he found his playing time limited and was frequently pinch hit for.

On November 11, 1949, DePhillips opened a sporting goods store on Francis Lewis Boulevard in Bayside. The grand opening was attended by sports greats of the times which included Phil Rizzuto of the Yankees, Gene Hermanski of the Dodgers, and Jake LaMotta, the middleweight boxing champ.

In the spring of 1950, Tony started a youth baseball league in the neighborhood with 150 kids. By 1954, 600 youngsters were participating and by 1958 Tony's youth club had 1,200 members. Initially a baseball club, other sports were added that included basketball, football, bowling, handball, roller hockey and archery. The initial ages of the participants were 10–14 with 15–16-year-old division being added in 1952 and a 9-year-old group in 1953. Varsity baseball and basketball travel teams were also added, and players from those teams went on to participate in high school and college teams and receive major league tryouts.

In the late 1950s and early 1960s, DePhillips served as the physical education teacher at the Henley School in Jamaica Estates, Queens.

Tony also officiated college and NBA basketball games and was a scout for the Philadelphia A's and the New York Yankees.

In 1978, he was inducted into the Fordham University Hall of Fame. He died on May 5, 1994, in Port Jefferson, New York, at the age of 81.
