= Joe Burns (infielder) =

American baseball player (1916-1974)

Philadelphia Athletics – No. 22
- Third baseman, right fielder, and second baseman
- Born: June 17, 1916; Bryn Mawr, Pennsylvania, U.S.
- Died: June 24, 1974 (aged 58); Bryn Mawr, Pennsylvania, U.S.
- Batted: Right Threw: Right

MLB debut
- April 24, 1943, for the Boston Braves

Last MLB appearance
- September 27, 1945, for the Philadelphia Athletics

MLB statistics (through 1945)
- Batting average: .230
- Hits: 69
- Home runs: 2
- Runs batted in: 16
- Stolen bases: 2
- Stats at Baseball Reference

Teams
- Boston Braves (1943); Philadelphia Athletics (1944–1945)

Joseph James Burns (June 17, 1916 – June 24, 1974) was an American Major League Baseball infielder. He played for the Boston Braves during the 1943 season and the Philadelphia Athletics during the 1944 and 1945 seasons.
