= Sam Gentile =

American baseball player

- Pinch hitter / Pinch runner
- Born: October 12, 1916; Charlestown, Massachusetts, U.S.
- Died: May 4, 1998 (aged 81); Everett, Massachusetts, U.S.
- Batted: Left Threw: Right

MLB debut
- April 24, 1943, for the Boston Braves

Last MLB appearance
- May 31, 1943, for the Boston Braves

MLB statistics
- At bats: 4
- Runs: 1
- Hits: 1
- Doubles: 1
- Batting average: .250
- Stats at Baseball Reference

Teams
- Boston Braves (1943)

Samuel Christopher Gentile (October 12, 1916 – May 4, 1998) was an American outfielder in Major League Baseball who played for the Boston Braves during its 1943 season, being used exclusively as a pinch hitter and pinch runner in just eight games. He served in the United States Navy during World War II. He spent 43 years as recreation director for the city of Everett, Massachusetts and was a member of its city council from 1988 to 1994.
