= 1943 in baseball =

The following are the baseball events of the year 1943 throughout the world.

== Champions ==
=== Major League Baseball ===
- World Series: New York Yankees over St. Louis Cardinals (4–1)
- All-Star Game, July 13 at Shibe Park: American League, 5–3

=== Other champions ===
- Amateur World Series: Cuba
- Negro League World Series: Homestead Grays over Birmingham Black Barons (4–3)
- Negro League Baseball All-Star Game: West, 2–1
- All-American Girls Professional Baseball League: Racine Belles over Kenosha Comets

== Awards and honors ==
- Most Valuable Player
  - Spud Chandler (AL) – P, New York Yankees
  - Stan Musial (NL) – 1B, St. Louis Cardinals
- The Sporting News Player of the Year Award
  - Spud Chandler – P, New York Yankees
- The Sporting News Most Valuable Player Award
  - Spud Chandler (AL) – P, New York Yankees
  - Stan Musial (NL) – 1B, St. Louis Cardinals
- The Sporting News Manager of the Year Award
  - Joe McCarthy (AL) – New York Yankees

== Statistical leaders ==
Any team shown in small text indicates a previous team a player was on during the season.

	American League		National League		Negro American League		Negro National League	
Stat	Player	Total	Player	Total	Player	Total	Player	Total
AVG	Luke Appling (CWS)	.328	Stan Musial (STL)	.357	Alex Radcliff (CAG)	.369	Tetelo Vargas^{1} (NYC)	.471
HR	Rudy York (DET)	34	Bill Nicholson (CHC)	29	Willard Brown (KCM)	7	Josh Gibson (HOM)	20
RBI	Rudy York (DET)	118	Bill Nicholson (CHC)	128	Willard Brown (KCM)	31	Josh Gibson (HOM)	109
W	Spud Chandler (NYY); Dizzy Trout (DET)	20	Mort Cooper (STL); Elmer Riddle (CIN); Rip Sewell (PIT)	21	Satchel Paige (KCM/MEM)	10	Johnny Wright^{2} (HOM)	18
ERA	Spud Chandler (NYY)	1.64	Max Lanier (STL)	1.90	Theolic Smith (CLB)	2.22	Johnny Wright^{2} (HOM)	2.54
K	Allie Reynolds (CLE)	151	Johnny Vander Meer (CIN)	174	Satchel Paige (KCM/MEM)	102	Bill Byrd (BEG/PHS); Johnny Wright^{2} (HOM)	94

^{1} All-time single-season batting average record
^{2} Negro National League Triple Crown pitching winner

== Major league baseball final standings ==
=== American League final standings ===
American League
Team	W	L	Pct.	GB	Home	Road
New York Yankees	98	56	.636	—	54‍–‍23	44‍–‍33
Washington Senators	84	69	.549	13½	44‍–‍32	40‍–‍37
Cleveland Indians	82	71	.536	15½	44‍–‍33	38‍–‍38
Chicago White Sox	82	72	.532	16	40‍–‍36	42‍–‍36
Detroit Tigers	78	76	.506	20	45‍–‍32	33‍–‍44
St. Louis Browns	72	80	.474	25	44‍–‍33	28‍–‍47
Boston Red Sox	68	84	.447	29	39‍–‍36	29‍–‍48
Philadelphia Athletics	49	105	.318	49	27‍–‍51	22‍–‍54

Locations of teams for the 1942–1953 American League seasons
American League

=== National League final standings ===
National League
Team	W	L	Pct.	GB	Home	Road
St. Louis Cardinals	105	49	.682	—	58‍–‍21	47‍–‍28
Cincinnati Reds	87	67	.565	18	48‍–‍29	39‍–‍38
Brooklyn Dodgers	81	72	.529	23½	46‍–‍31	35‍–‍41
Pittsburgh Pirates	80	74	.519	25	47‍–‍30	33‍–‍44
Chicago Cubs	74	79	.484	30½	36‍–‍38	38‍–‍41
Boston Braves	68	85	.444	36½	38‍–‍39	30‍–‍46
Philadelphia Phillies	64	90	.416	41	33‍–‍43	31‍–‍47
New York Giants	55	98	.359	49½	34‍–‍43	21‍–‍55

Locations of teams for the 1943–1952 National League seasons
National League

== Negro league baseball final standings ==
All Negro leagues standings below are per MLB and Seamheads.

=== Negro American League final standings ===
This was the seventh season of the Negro American League. Birmingham and Chicago each won a half of the season, which therefore matched them up in a matchup to determine the champion for the NAL pennant to determine who would make the 1943 Negro World Series. Birmingham prevailed in five games to win their first ever pennant.

vs. Negro American League						vs. Major Black teams			
Negro American League	W	L	T	Pct.	GB	W	L	T	Pct.
Kansas City Monarchs	30	19	1	.610	1	52	39	1	.571
^{(1)} Birmingham Black Barons	37	24	3	.602	—	62	49	3	.557
Cleveland Buckeyes	38	26	2	.591	½	52	40	3	.563
^{(2)} Chicago American Giants	32	29	1	.524	5	45	38	1	.542
Memphis Red Sox	28	46	4	.385	15½	49	59	4	.455
Cincinnati Clowns	25	46	5	.362	17	41	67	5	.385

^{(1)} First half champion ^{(2)} Second half champion

==== Negro National League postseason ====
- Birmingham Black Barons over Chicago American Giants (3–2).
Locations of teams for the 1943 Negro American League season
Negro American League

=== Negro National League final standings ===
This was the eleventh season of the second Negro National League. For the sixth time in seven seasons, the Homestead Grays won the pennant, this time under manager Candy Jim Taylor.

vs. Negro National League						vs. Major Black teams			
Negro National League	W	L	T	Pct.	GB	W	L	T	Pct.
Homestead Grays	26	7	1	.779	—	78	23	1	.770
New York Cubans	17	9	1	.648	5½	38	28	2	.574
Newark Eagles	18	14	0	.563	7½	29	33	0	.468
Harrisburg–St. Louis Stars†	5	4	0	.556	9	12	14	1	.463
Philadelphia Stars	19	25	1	.433	12½	24	33	1	.422
Baltimore Elite Giants	14	21	2	.408	13	26	46	3	.367
New York Black Yankees	2	21	1	.104	19	8	33	2	.209

†Harrisburg–St. Louis Stars withdrew from league in July.

Locations of teams for the 1943 Negro National League season
Negro National League
Note: Homestead Grays played in both Washington, D.C. and Pittsburgh, with the majority in Washington, D.C.

=== Negro World Series ===
- 1943 Negro World Series: Homestead Grays over Birmingham Black Barons 4–3 (one tie).

=== Independent teams final standings ===
The Negro National League All Star team & Atlanta Black Crackers played against the two leagues.

vs. All Teams
Independent Clubs	W	L	T	Pct.	GB
Atlanta Black Crackers	7	19	1	.278	5
NNL All Stars	1	3	0	.250	—

== All-American Girls Professional Baseball League final standings ==
=== First half ===
Rank	Team	W	L	Pct.	GB
1	Racine Belles	34	20	.630	—
2	South Bend Blue Sox	28	26	.519	6
3	Kenosha Comets	23	31	.426	11
4	Rockford Peaches	23	31	.426	11

=== Second half ===
Rank	Team	W	L	Pct.	GB
1	Kenosha Comets	33	21	.611	—
2	South Bend Blue Sox	30	24	.556	3
3	Racine Belles	29	25	.521	4
4	Rockford Peaches	20	34	.370	13

=== Composite records ===
Rank	Team	W	L	Pct.	GB
1	Racine Belles	59	49	.546	—
2	South Bend Blue Sox	58	50	.537	1
3	Kenosha Comets	56	52	.518	3
4	Rockford Peaches	43	65	.398	16

== Events ==
=== January ===
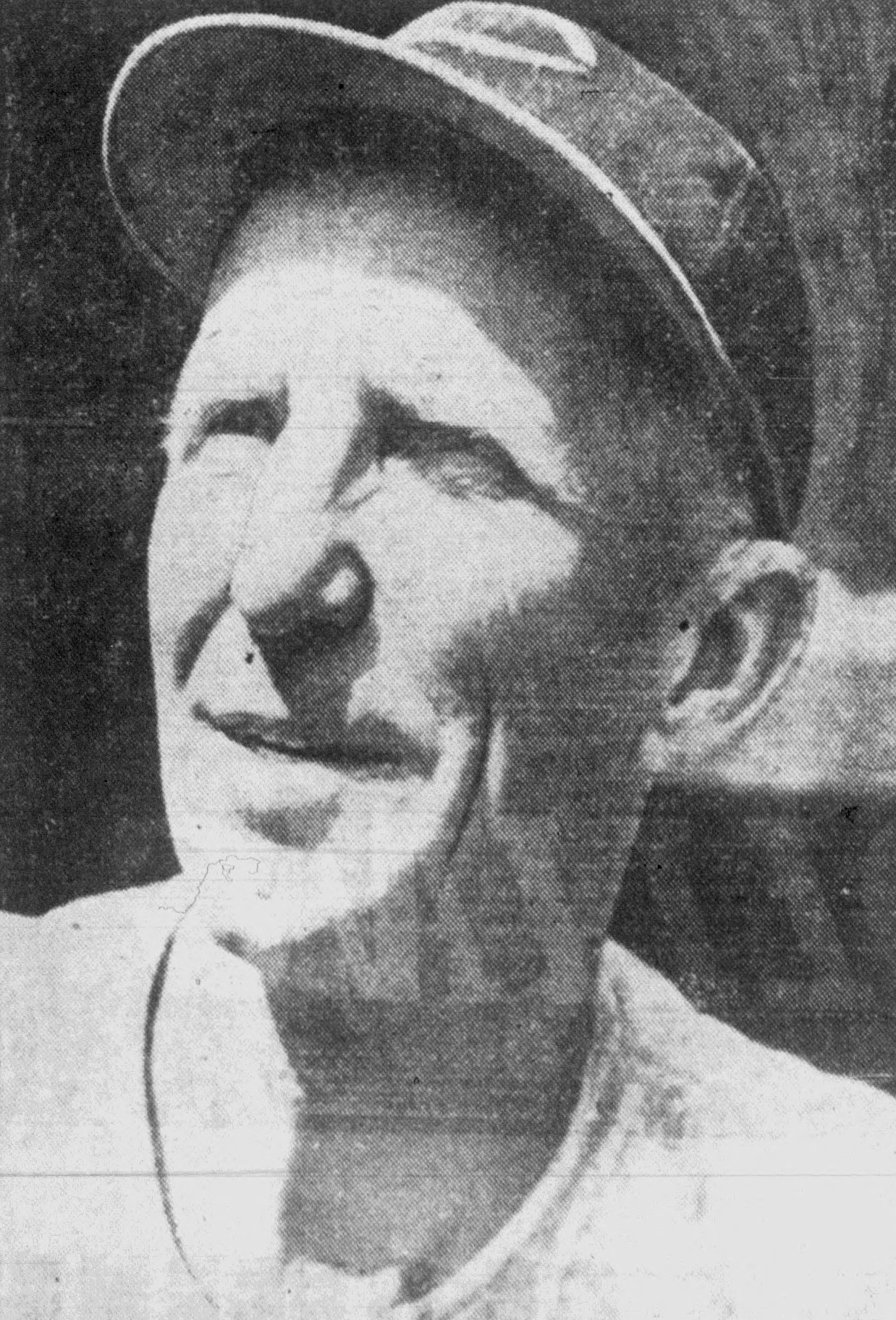
Hank Gowdy

- January 5:
  - As the United States enters its second full year as a combatant in World War II, Commissioner of Baseball Kenesaw Mountain Landis and the federal Office of Defense Transportation issue an edict that the 16 major-league clubs must restrict their spring training drills to sites east of the Mississippi and north of the Potomac and Ohio rivers. Clubs will work out on frozen outdoor fields or in indoor facilities; the training period will be significantly shortened; and "exhibition" games will be few.
  - Landis also rejects cutting the regular-season schedule to 140 games; a full, 154-game season will be played, but the opening day (now April 21) and closing day (now October 3) will be delayed one week.
- January 19 – With over 200 MLB players now serving in the Allies' armed forces at the start of 1943, clubs react to the growing "manpower shortage" by signing or acquiring older athletes and minor leaguers. Today, the Cincinnati Reds sign outfielder Estel Crabtree, 39, as a free agent. Crabtree had spent part of 1942 with the St. Louis Cardinals and as a player–manager in the minor leagues, but appeared in only 17 total games.
- January 21 – Just 48 hours after being released by the Boston Braves, Paul Waner is signed by the Brooklyn Dodgers. The future Baseball Hall-of-Fame outfielder, now 39, had racked up his 3,000th hit as a member of the Braves on June 19, 1942, against his longtime team, the Pittsburgh Pirates.
- January 22 – The New York Yankees acquire hard-hitting outfielder Nick Etten from the financially struggling Philadelphia Phillies for pitcher Al Gettel, first baseman Ed Levy and $10,000. The deal will be reworked on March 26, when the Bombers take back Gettel and Levy, and send pitcher Al Gerheauser and catcher Tom Padden to Philadelphia.
- January 25 – The Braves purchase the contract of Lefty Gomez from the Yankees. During his 13 seasons in the Bronx, future Hall of Famer Gomez, 34, has won 189 games (and six World Series championships) and been selected to seven American League All-Star teams.
- January 27 – In another cash transaction, the Chicago Cubs purchase veteran right-hander Paul Derringer from the Cincinnati Reds. Derringer, 36, is a six-time National League All-Star who will win 16 games for the pennant-winning 1945 Cubs.
- January 29:
  - The New York Yankees keep dealing, sending pitcher Milo Candini and second baseman Jerry Priddy to the Washington Senators for hurler Bill Zuber and cash.
  - The U.S. Bureau of Internal Revenue rules that, except for the highest-paid man on each team, professional baseball players may negotiate pay hikes from team owners without its review or approval. The bureau has jurisdiction over all raises that exceed $5,000 a year. At $43,000, the Yankees' Joe DiMaggio boasted 1942's highest annual salary.
- January 30:
  - Cincinnati Reds coach Hank Gowdy, a former catcher who on June 1, 1917, became the first American big leaguer to enlist in the U.S. Army during World War I, rejoins the fighting ranks for the Second World War. Gowdy, 53, will serve "stateside" as a major, and not return to baseball until 1946.
  - Pee Wee Reese, standout young shortstop of the Brooklyn Dodgers, enlists in the United States Navy. Earlier this month, Brooklyn's star centerfielder, Pete Reiser, entered the U.S. Army. Even Reese's potential replacement, 37-year-old player-manager Leo Durocher, faces a possible call to arms from his local draft board.

=== February ===
- February 1 – The St. Louis Browns of the American League purchase the contract of right-hander Paul "Daffy" Dean, 30, from the Washington Senators. The Browns had tried to trade pitcher Elden Auker for Dean in January, but the deal was called off when Auker retired from baseball to work for a war-related manufacturing company in Detroit. The younger brother of Dizzy Dean is attempting a comeback in the majors after posting a 19–8 (2.05) record in the Class A1 Texas League in 1942.
- February 3 – With Ted Williams serving in the United States Marines, the Boston Red Sox attempt to fill the void by signing venerable slugger Al Simmons, now 40, to a playing contract. A full-time coach with the Philadelphia Athletics in 1942, Simmons will start 31 games as the Bosox' left-fielder over the course of the 1943 season, but the future Hall of Famer hits only .203 with one home run.
- February 15 – The two men contemporaneously recognized as the greatest hitters of all time—Ty Cobb and Rogers Hornsby—issue separate calls for professional baseball to continue during the war emergency. Cobb appeals to the War Manpower Commission to spare baseball from closure as a "matter of morale". Hornsby, general manager of the minor-league Fort Worth Cats, assails fellow Texas League executives who favor a shutdown. "This is no time to be afraid, weak and unwilling to take a chance," he declares.

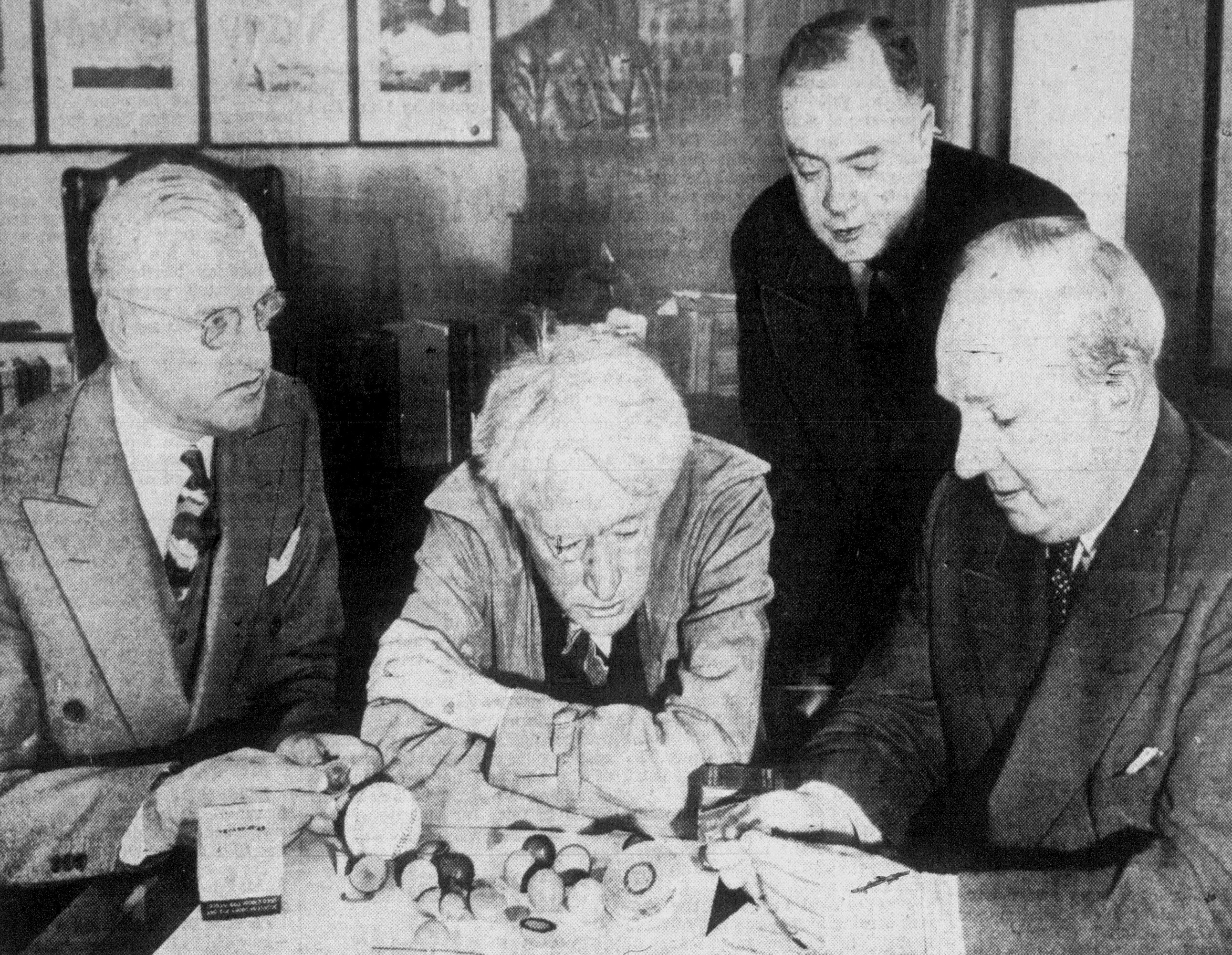
Kenesaw Mountain Landis (center) inspects 1943's new "balata baseballs." AL president Will Harridge (L), Landis aide Leslie O'Connor (standing), and Cincinnati GM Warren Giles (R) flank him.

- February 18:
  - Debt-ridden owner Gerald Nugent turns over control of the Philadelphia Phillies franchise to the National League, which will act as temporary "caretaker" of 93.8 percent of the team's stock until it completes a pending sale to an undisclosed buyer—who proves to be William D. Cox, a 33-year-old New York lumber broker. Cox becomes the youngest owner in the major leagues.
    - Today's transaction will gain notoriety when, in his 1962 autobiography, Veeck as in Wreck, entrepreneur/showman Bill Veeck alleges that the Senior Circuit and Commissioner Kenesaw Mountain Landis engineer Nugent's surrender of the Phillies to the NL to thwart Veeck's plan to shatter the baseball color line by buying the franchise and filling its roster with star players signed from the Negro leagues. Veeck's story will come to be challenged by some baseball historians, but ongoing research will reveal that it contains elements of truth.
  - Seven-time All-Star and 2x AL Most Valuable Player Joe DiMaggio, 28, enlists as a private in the U.S. Army and reports immediately to an induction center in Monterey, California.
- February 24:
  - The eight-team Texas League votes 6–2 to suspend play for the duration of the war, with the league president claiming that continuing professional baseball may hinder the war effort. The circuit, founded in 1888, has operated continuously since 1902; at Class A1, the second-highest level of Minor League Baseball, it is the most prominent league to shut down during the conflict.
  - Lifelong American Leaguer Bucky Harris is signed by new owner William D. Cox to replace Hans Lobert as manager of the NL's Philadelphia Phillies. Harris, now 46, is the one-time "Boy Manager" who has skippered AL teams—notably the Washington Senators—for the past 19 consecutive seasons.

=== March ===
- March 9 – The Philadelphia Phillies' new management team makes its first major trade, sending second baseman Al Glossop and outfielder Lloyd Waner to the Brooklyn Dodgers for first baseman Babe Dahlgren. The deal will reunite brothers and future Cooperstown inductees Paul ("Big Poison") and Lloyd Waner ("Little Poison"), who starred as teammates for over a decade with the Pittsburgh Pirates.
- March 13 – MLB owners and manufacturer A. G. Spalding Co. announce that, because of the severe global rubber shortage caused by World War II, the core of baseballs themselves will contain a substitute material, "Balatá". However, as the "balata ball" goes into circulation during the latter days of spring training, officials begin to notice a serious flaw: it barely bounces.
- March 21 – The Washington Senators acquire slugging veteran outfielder Bob Johnson from the Philadelphia Athletics for infielder Jimmy Pofahl, outfielder Roberto Estalella, and cash. Johnson, 37, hit 252 homers and made five American League All-Star teams during ten years as a member of the Athletics.
- March 24 – The Brooklyn Dodgers pick up shortstop/catcher Bobby Bragan from the Philadelphia Phillies in exchange for pitcher Jack Kraus and cash considerations. In a separate deal, Brooklyn sells the contract of pitcher Schoolboy Rowe to the Phils; Rowe, 33, will post a 14–8 (2.65) record in 27 games for the 1943 Phillies.

=== April ===
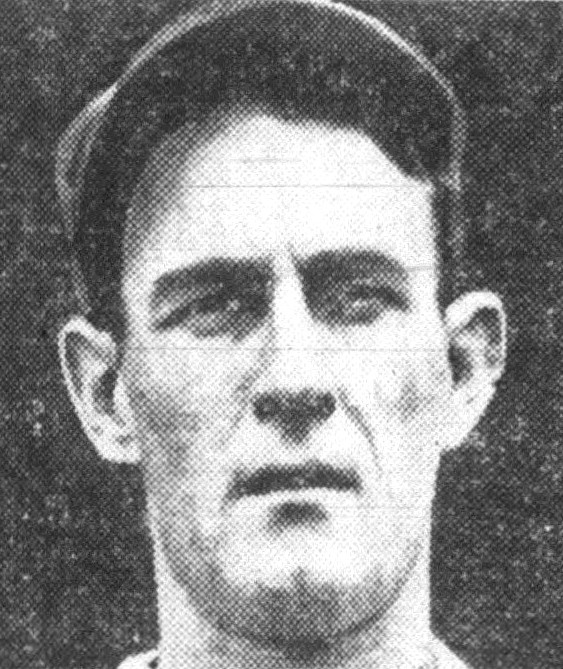
Johnny Allen

- April 16 – Branch Rickey, in his first full year as front-office boss of the Brooklyn Dodgers, makes three more transactions with the Philadelphia Phillies. He purchases the contracts of pitchers Johnny Allen and George Washburn, and sells the contract of infielder Glen Stewart to Philadelphia. In reacquiring the 38-year-old Allen, Rickey partially reverses the first trade he'd made as the Dodgers' president and general manager when, on December 12, 1942, he'd dealt the veteran pitcher to the Phils with cash for hurler Rube Melton.
- April 18 – The minor leagues' 1943 season opens with only ten "Organized Baseball" leagues taking the field; by contrast, 31 loops started the 1942 campaign and 41 leagues played in 1941. One of this year's entries is the Twin Ports League, a four-team, start-up designated the first and only "Class E" league at the lowest rung on the minor-league ladder. The TPL is created to employ players who also work in war-related industries and shipping in the cities of Duluth, Minnesota, and Superior, Wisconsin.
- April 20:
  - The MLB season begins at Griffith Stadium, where the Washington Senators lash 12 hits and defeat the Philadelphia Athletics, 7–5, before 25,093. Paul V. McNutt, chairman of the powerful War Manpower Commission, throws out the first pitch in place of Franklin Delano Roosevelt, who is visiting armaments plants, at the traditional "Presidential Opener."
  - The night before the National League season is scheduled to begin, Boston Braves manager Casey Stengel is struck by a taxicab as he tries to cross a Kenmore Square street. Suffering from a badly broken right leg, Stengel will not return to the Braves' helm for almost two months; coach Bob Coleman handles the second-division club in the meantime. At season's end, a sarcastic local sportswriter will nominate the cab driver as "the man who has done the most for baseball in Boston" during 1943.
- April 21:
  - A Crosley Field crowd of 27,709 sees the Cincinnati Reds' Johnny Vander Meer fire an 11-inning, two-hit shutout to defeat the defending world champion St. Louis Cardinals, 1–0.
  - While bad weather washes out three openers in the northeastern U.S., the other three contests played are also shutouts. Officials such as Cincinnati general manager Warren Giles sound a warning that the "balata ball" just introduced will spawn a new "dead ball era" because of its lethargic behavior. An informal comparison between 1942 and 1943 baseballs demonstrates that the balata shows markedly less "bounce" than the previous model when dropped from a grandstand rooftop at Crosley Field.
- April 24 – Even with the balata ball in use early in the season, no MLB pitcher or pitching staff records a no-hitter game during 1943. Today, the first of 12 complete-game one-hitters goes into the books; it's authored by Spud Chandler of the New York Yankees, who blanks the visiting Washington Senators, 1–0, in his first starting assignment of the year. Ellis Clary leads off the contest with a double, and Chandler holds the "Griffs" hitless the rest of the way. It's an auspicious start for what will eventually be an AL-MVP-Award-winning year for Chandler, who (among other categories) will lead the Junior Circuit in shutouts.
- April 27 – The New York Giants obtain the reigning NL batting king, catcher Ernie Lombardi, from the Boston Braves for catcher Hugh Poland and infielder Connie Ryan. Six-time All-Star Lombardi, 35, who hit .330 in 1942 to win his second batting crown, was the circuit's Most Valuable Player in 1938 and will be elected to the Hall of Fame in 1986. New York also releases 295 lb (134 kg) relief pitcher Jumbo Brown.

=== May ===
- May 1 – Right-hander Bobo Newsom of the Brooklyn Dodgers throws the National League's first one-hitter of 1943, defeating the New York Giants, 3–0, in the nightcap of a Polo Grounds doubleheader. Babe Barna's sixth-inning single is the only safety allowed by the well-traveled, 35-year-old Newsom, who walks five. During the contest, Brooklyn's Alex Kampouris comes to the plate twice in a row in the second; he bats out of order and flies out, then, sent back to the plate to bat in his correct slot, draws a walk. The Dodgers don't score, and Giants player-manager Mel Ott, who's stationed in right field, files no protest.
- May 5 – There are no balata-ball blues at Ebbets Field: led by four each from Augie Galan and Paul Waner, the Dodgers pile up 23 hits, most by a team in 1943, in today's 18–6 romp over the Philadelphia Phillies. Nearly a full month from now, Brooklyn will also strike again for 23 hits in an 18–5 victory over the Chicago Cubs at Wrigley Field on June 4.
- May 9 – Livelier, re-formulated baseballs are shipped to the eight American League ballparks, signaling the beginning of the end of 1943's "dead-ball era" in the Junior Circuit. National League teams, meanwhile, find enough 1942 baseballs to replace their supply of balata balls until the bouncier new spheroids are supplied to their eight clubs.
- May 16 – A pinch hitter walks and steals second for the Boston Red Sox in the seventh inning of Boston's 4–2 defeat at the hands of the Chicago White Sox in the first game of a doubleheader at Comiskey Park. The pinch-hitter will be officially identified as "Al Olsen" in multiple editions of The Baseball Encyclopedia. Researchers will discover, more than 40 years later, that they've had the wrong man all along: Olsen, a Red Sox farmhand, is playing for San Diego of the Pacific Coast League, over 1,700 miles from Chicago. Says Olsen in 1990, now 68, "That wasn't me ... I never played a game in the major leagues." It will be determined that rookie Leon Culberson, who makes his MLB debut today, is the mystery man. Olsen's name will be expunged from MLB's record books, and Culberson (who died in 1989) belatedly credited with the walk and stolen base.
- May 21 – Future Hall of Famer Lefty Gomez, unconditionally released by the Boston Braves two days earlier without appearing in a single regular-season game, signs with the Washington Senators as a free agent. Gomez, 34, will work in only one contest for Washington, on May 30 against the Chicago White Sox at Griffith Stadium. In the fifth, trailing the ChiSox 3–1, Gomez suffers a career-ending injury to his pitching shoulder.
- May 27 – Fiery relief pitcher Johnny Allen, who has allowed only one earned run in 101/3 innings all season, enters in the eighth inning of a 5–5 tie between his Brooklyn Dodgers and the host Pittsburgh Pirates with two men on and none out. He promptly surrenders two singles, a walk and three runs. When a balk allows a fourth tally to score, an infuriated Allen charges at first-base umpire George Barr and is tackled by Brooklyn manager Leo Durocher and coach Clyde Sukeforth. Allen is ejected, suspended for 30 days and fined $200; three of his teammates also are ejected; the Dodgers ultimately fall, 9–5.
- May 30 – The All-American Girls Professional Baseball League begins its first 108-game season with teams in Rockford, Kenosha, Racine, and South Bend. In the Opening Game, South Bend defeats Rockford in 14 innings by a 4–3 score. The league's total attendance for the year will be 176,612.

=== June ===
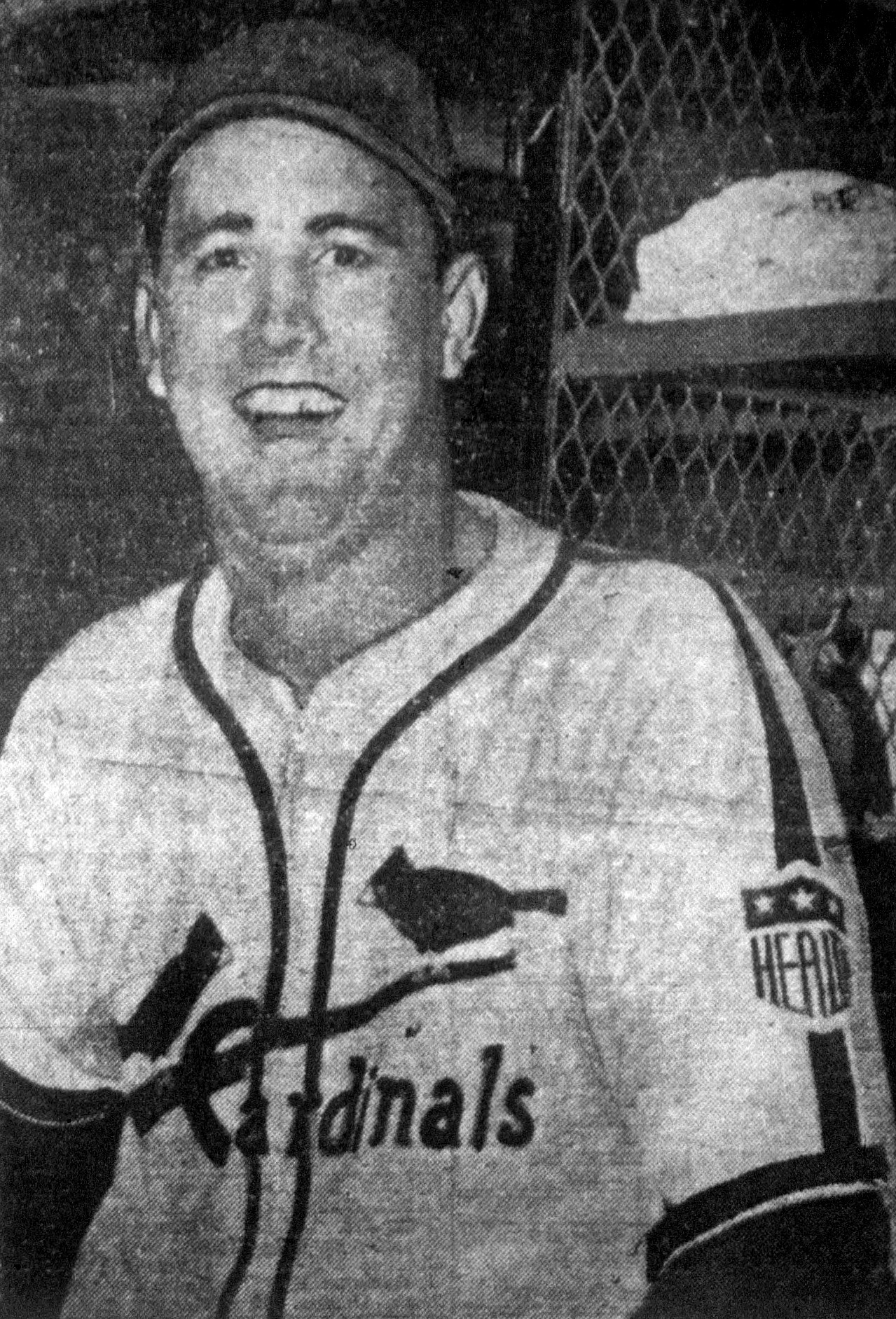
Mort Cooper

- June 1 – Beginning the new month trailing the arch-rival Brooklyn Dodgers by 1½ games for the National League lead, the St. Louis Cardinals obtain hard-hitting Danny Litwhiler, along with Earl Naylor, from the Philadelphia Phillies for Coaker Triplett, Buster Adams and Dain Clay; all five players involved in the deal are outfielders, although Naylor moonlights as a right-handed pitcher. Litwhiler, 26, a 1942 NL All-Star, is the key man in the trade.
- June 4 – Cardinals ace hurler Mort Cooper allows only an eighth-inning single to Jimmy Wasdell in his 5–0, one-hit triumph over the Phillies at Sportsman's Park. Cooper walks one, and his fielding error accounts for the only other Philadelphia baserunner. It's Cooper's second consecutive one-hit, complete-game shutout: he had blanked Brooklyn, 7–0, on one hit (by Billy Herman) and three bases on balls on May 31.
- June 6:
  - At Forbes Field, the Pittsburgh Pirates smash four triples in an 18–1 trouncing of the New York Giants.
  - The Philadelphia Phillies send outfielder Dain Clay, acquired five days ago, to the Cincinnati Reds for shortstop Charlie Brewster.
- June 12 – Five Cleveland Indians pitchers issue 17 bases on balls in an 11-inning, 7–6 loss to the St. Louis Browns at Cleveland Stadium. The 17 free passes are the most allowed by any MLB team in 1943.
- June 14 – The Boston Red Sox obtain outfielder Babe Barna from the New York Giants for left-hander Ken Chase, once called "the toughest southpaw I ever batted against" by slugger Ted Williams.
- June 23 – The Detroit Tigers sign right-hander Henry Kawaihoa "Prince" Oana, 33, a native of Hawaii who has been playing in the minor leagues since 1929. Initially an outfielder, he had auditioned briefly for the 1934 Phillies and collected five hits. Now a full-time pitcher (and pinch hitter), Oana had posted a 16–5 (1.72) mark for the Fort Worth Cats in 1942, then was declared a free agent by Commissioner Kenesaw Mountain Landis after the Texas League suspended operations this past February. Over the next two months, Oana will appear in ten games on the mound and 12 contests as a pinch hitter for the Tigers; he'll win three games in relief and post a 4.50 ERA in 34 innings, and bat .385 (10-for-26) with two doubles, a triple, and a home run and seven RBI.

=== July ===
- July 1 – The first AAGPBL All-Star Game—and the first night game to be played at Wrigley Field—takes place under temporary lights. The game pits players from the Kenosha Comets and Racine Belles against those from the Rockford Peaches and South Bend Blue Sox.
- July 3 – Boston Red Sox rookie outfielder Leon Culberson hits for the cycle in a 12–4 road victory over the Indians at Cleveland Stadium. Culberson's is the only "cycle" in the "organized" majors in 1943 and the first cycle in MLB to be completed by an inside the park home run.
- July 10 – Brooklyn Dodgers manager Leo Durocher is forced to quell a mini-mutiny among his players after he suspends headstrong pitcher Bobo Newsom for insubordination and criticizes the hurler in a newspaper interview. Shortstop/third baseman Arky Vaughan, a future member of the Hall of Fame, strips off his uniform in support of Newsom and refuses to play. During a pregame team meeting, Dodger star Dixie Walker, angry at Newsom's treatment, also threatens to walk out.
  - With Vaughan on the sidelines but Walker in the lineup, the Dodgers take the field, tally ten runs in the first inning, and thrash the visiting Pittsburgh Pirates, 23–6, the most runs scored in a single game by any MLB club during 1943.
  - Vaughan will return to action for Brooklyn's July 11 doubleheader. Newsom, who is 9–4 (3.02) in 22 appearances with six complete games, one shutout and one save, never pitches again for the Dodgers; he will be waived to the St. Louis Browns on July 15 for pitchers Archie McKain and Fritz Ostermueller.
- July 11:
  - In the first game of a Braves Field doubleheader, Harry Gumbert fires the St. Louis Cardinals' fourth straight complete-game shutout in defeating Boston, 3–0. The Redbird staff's scoreless-innings-pitched streak will reach 422/3 before it's snapped in the first inning of Game 2 today.
  - The arrival of the annual All-Star break sees the eventual pennant-winners fattening their leads. In the American League, the New York Yankees (43–30–1) have overcome a poor start to July by winning their ninth game in 11 starts, to take a 4½-game lead over the Detroit Tigers (38–34–1). In the National League, the Cardinals (47–24–3) have won 14 of 16 games since June 27 to leapfrog the quarreling Dodgers (47–34) and build a five-game bulge.
- July 13 – At Shibe Park, home of the Philadelphia Athletics, a near-capacity crowd of 31,938 witnesses a 5–3 American League win in the 1943 All-Star Game—the first Midsummer Classic to take place under the lights. Future Hall of Famer Bobby Doerr of the Boston Red Sox delivers the decisive blow, a three-run homer in the second inning. The game raises $115,000 for the "Bat and Ball Fund," which buys baseball equipment for servicemen. The first pitch is delayed to 9 p.m. local time to enable the BBC to carry the game live by shortwave to Allied military personnel across the globe.
- July 16 – The New York Giants claim Joe Medwick off waivers from the Brooklyn Dodgers. The future Hall-of-Fame outfielder, 31, is a nine-time (1934–1942) NL All-Star.
- July 21 – Stan Musial, playing only his second full big-league season, enjoys his first career five-hit game, knocking in four runs in the St. Louis Cardinals' 14–6 triumph over the visiting Giants in the second game of a twin bill. Musial, 22, becomes the ninth of 11 MLB players to make five hits in a game in 1943, but the feat is noteworthy becomes it comes during one of his most dominant seasons as a batsman; he will lead the NL in 12 key offensive categories, including base hits (220), and register six four-hit games. He'll also win his first Most Valuable Player Award.
- July 27 – His once-promising debut season ruined by a 9–23 record during July, the Philadelphia Phillies' impulsive new owner, William D. Cox, fires manager Bucky Harris and replaces him with veteran pitcher Fred Fitzsimmons, released by the Brooklyn Dodgers to take the assignment.
  - The firing threatens to spark a full-scale player mutiny against the 33-year-old Cox, whose bad behavior includes offering unsolicited batting tips, criticizing players in the press, and notifying reporters about Harris's dismissal without telling Harris himself. Cox has also been forced to publicly apologize to Ford Frick for questioning the NL president's integrity. The Phillies' playing roster presents a petition threatening to strike, but withdraw their protest when Cox apologizes to Harris at a clubhouse meeting. They then take the field and defeat the first-place Cardinals, 6–4, to break the Redbirds' 11-game winning streak.
  - The repercussions of the dismissal will still prove significant. Harris is summoned to a meeting with Commissioner of Baseball Kenesaw Mountain Landis, and the fired manager will become an influential prosecution witness in Landis's probe into reports that Cox is betting on Phillies games.
- July 31 – The Dodgers, who've faded to 10½ games behind the front-running St. Louis Cardinals, deal hot-tempered pitcher Johnny Allen and 1941 NL MVP Dolph Camilli to the arch-enemy New York Giants for pitchers Bill Lohrman and Bill Sayles and infielder Joe Orengo. Although Camilli, 36, refuses to report—later admitting "I hated the Giants"—the trade will stand.

=== August ===
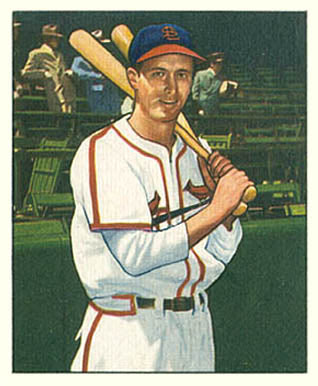
Harry Walker

- August 7 – The Washington Senators purchase the contract of Jake Powell from St. Paul of the American Association—the first time Powell returns to the majors since September 29, 1940.
- August 18:
  - Harry Walker raps out three hits in five at bats, driving in two runs and extending his batting streak to 29 games in helping Howie Krist and the St. Louis Cardinals blank the Philadelphia Phillies, 6–0, at Shibe Park. Walker's hitting streak is MLB's longest of 1943; during it, he goes 46-for-118 (.404).
  - The 60–53 Senators, tied for second in the American League but nine games behind the New York Yankees, obtain knuckleball hurler Johnny Niggeling and veteran third baseman Harlond Clift from the St. Louis Browns for pitcher Ox Miller, infielder Ellis Clary and cash.
- August 24 – In the second game of a doubleheader at Comiskey Park, knuckleballer Roger Wolff allows only one unearned run in an 8–1 victory over the Chicago White Sox and his Philadelphia Athletics break a losing streak that has lasted for 20 games and 17 days. At 41–78, Connie Mack's crew resides in the AL basement, 32 games behind the pace-setting New York Yankees.
- August 31 – Much-traveled pitcher Bobo Newsom, 36, changes addresses again when the St. Louis Browns sell his contract to the Washington Senators. The deal kicks off the third of Newsom's six separate stints with Washington between 1935 and 1952.

=== September ===
- September 4:
  - At Ebbets Field, New York City's "transpontine rivals" engage in MLB's longest game of 1943: 17 innings, with the Brooklyn Dodgers edging the New York Giants, 4–3, on an unearned run. Brooklyn starter Rex Barney, 18, goes 14 innings before leaving for a pinch hitter; the win goes to reliever Ed Head.
  - The Chicago Cubs trade left-hander Ken Raffensberger to the Philadelphia Phillies for two players to be named later, pitchers Dick Conger and Andy Karl. Raffensberger, 26, is coming off a 19-game-winning season in the Pacific Coast League; over the next 11 years, he'll win 112 games for the Phillies and Cincinnati Reds.
- September 6:
  - With 1942's champions running away from their competition, there's no suspense in either 1943 pennant race after Labor Day weekend. In the American League, the 80–49–1 New York Yankees lead the 68–59 Cleveland Indians and the 71–62 Washington Senators by 11 games. In the National League, the 87–44–3 St. Louis Cardinals have a 14½-game margin over the 72–58–1 Cincinnati Reds.
    - The Cardinals will clinch their seventh NL pennant on September 18; the Yankees will conquer the Junior Circuit for the 14th time on the 25th.
  - The Dodgers sign 19-year-old Gil Hodges as an amateur free agent out of Saint Joseph's College of Indiana. Hodges will play one professional game in 1943—for Brooklyn on the closing day of the regular season, October 3, as a third baseman—and go hitless in two at bats. He then enters the United States Marine Corps and sees combat in World War II.
- September 24 – The Chicago White Sox and last-place Philadelphia Athletics battle for 16 innings at Shibe Park, but can't break a 3–3 deadlock. The game goes into the books as one of the AL's three tie games of 1943, and individual statistics will count. Jesse Flores hurls all 16 innings for Philadelphia, but fails to gain a decision.
- September 27 – The Athletics purchase third baseman George Kell and outfielders Lew Flick and Woody Wheaton from the Lancaster Red Roses of the Class B Interstate League. Kell, 21, has just led the circuit in batting (.396), runs scored (120) and hits (220); when he debuts tomorrow, he will launch a 15-year MLB career that includes an AL batting title (.343 in 1949), ten All-Star selections, and a berth in the Hall of Fame.
- September 30 – The Pittsburgh Pirates obtain southpaw Preacher Roe from the St. Louis Cardinals for right-hander Johnny Podgajny, outfielder Johnny Wyrostek and cash.

=== October ===
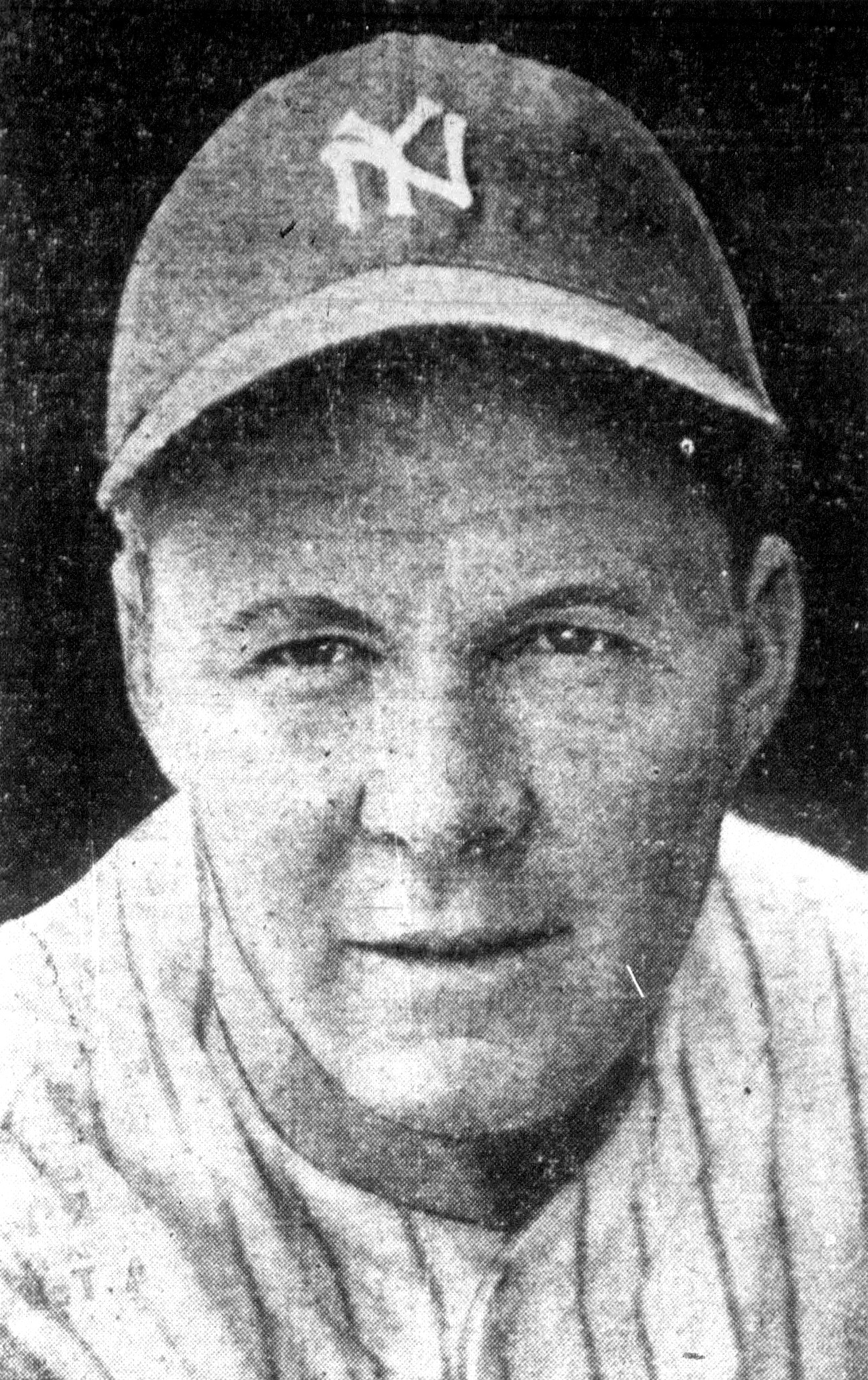
Spud Chandler

- October 5:
  - The 1943 World Series—which for the second consecutive year pits the New York Yankees against the St. Louis Cardinals—begins in The Bronx. Because of travel restrictions imposed by World War II, the 1943 Fall Classic will abandon the traditional 2–3–2 home/road game format; the first three meetings will occur at Yankee Stadium, with Sportsman's Park hosting Game 4 and Games 5–7, if necessary.
    - In Game 1 today, Spud Chandler outduels Max Lanier and the Yankees prevail, 4–2, before 68,766. Joe Gordon hits a solo homer, but the winning tally scores in the sixth on a wild pitch. Uniformed Allied military personnel standing in ticket lines are escorted to the front of the queues and given priority to attend the contest. An unauthorized "fly-over" by a USAAF B-17 Flying Fortress rattles the crowd when the heavy bomber passes dangerously close to the Yankee Stadium roof; mayor Fiorello LaGuardia officially complains to the First Air Force Command.
  - It takes eight games to settle the 1943 Negro World Series. Today, in Montgomery, Alabama, the Homestead Grays—who feature Josh Gibson, Cool Papa Bell and Buck Leonard—score six unanswered runs in the eighth and ninth to come from behind and defeat the Birmingham Black Barons, 8–4. The Grays win the series, four games to three, with one tie.
- October 11 – With their mound ace, Chandler, hurling his second complete game, a 2–0 shutout, the Yankees defeat the Cardinals to win their tenth World Series championship, four games to one, before 33,872. Bill Dickey's two-run homer breaks a scoreless tie in the sixth inning. Yankees' manager Joe McCarthy captures his seventh and final MLB title, and gains revenge for the Redbirds' five-game triumph of 1942—the only Fall Classic McCarthy's Bombers would ever lose.
- October 25 – The fate of Leo Durocher is decided when Brooklyn Dodgers club president Branch Rickey signs his controversial manager to a one-year contract to return for a sixth season in 1944. Rickey had left the 38-year-old pilot dangling after a disappointing 1943 campaign that saw the Dodgers finish 23½ games behind the St. Louis Cardinals and endure a brief player uprising against Durocher in mid-season.

=== November ===
- November 11 – The Baseball Writers' Association of America bestows its 1943 MLB Most Valuable Player Awards.
  - After leading American League pitchers in wins (20), winning percentage (.833), earned run average (1.64), complete games (20), and shutouts (five), right-hander Spud Chandler of the New York Yankees takes home the Junior Circuit's MVP honors with 246 points and 12 first-place votes; batting champion Luke Appling of the Chicago White Sox places second (215, five). Chandler also shines with two victories in the 1943 World Series, which takes place after the MVP ballots have been cast.
  - Only 22 and in his sophomore MLB season, Stan Musial of the St. Louis Cardinals wins the first of his three career MVP awards. The NL's batting champ (.357), Musial also leads the Senior Circuit in hits (220), doubles (48), triples (20), on-base percentage (.425), slugging percentage (.562), and total bases (347). In the BBWAA balloting, Musial outpoints his nearest challenger, teammate Walker Cooper, 267 to 192, and gains 13 first-place votes to Cooper's five. Slugging Bill Nicholson of the Chicago Cubs also gets five first-place mentions.
- November 23 – Culminating a three-month-long investigation, Commissioner Kenesaw Mountain Landis rules that Philadelphia Phillies owner William D. Cox is permanently ineligible to hold office or be employed in "Organized Baseball" for having bet on his own team. Immediately after Landis' verdict, the R. R. M. Carpenter family of Wilmington, Delaware, acquires Cox's stock, and R. R. M. Carpenter Jr., at age 28, becomes the youngest team president in MLB history. The family will operate the Phillies for 38 years.
- November 24 – Veteran first baseman Joe Kuhel, 37, returns to the Washington Senators, for whom he played from 1930 to 1937, when his contract is purchased from the Chicago White Sox.
- November 27 – Bill Veeck, the 29-year-old "maverick" co-owner of the Milwaukee Brewers of the American Association, enlists in the United States Marines as a private. A relentless, creative baseball promoter, Veeck has built the Brewers into a success on the field and at the turnstiles. Seeking combat duty, he serves in a Marine artillery unit during the Bougainville Campaign, where the recoil of an anti-aircraft gun causes an injury to his right leg so severe that the limb will eventually be amputated below the knee.

=== December ===
Paul Robeson

- December 1:
  - With only nine leagues operating due to the war emergency, the minor-league convention in New York witnesses an incipient revolt. The uprising, if successful, would oust longtime minor-league president William G. Bramham in favor of Frank Shaughnessy, president of the top-level International League, and potentially end the Commissioner of Baseball's control of the minors themselves.
    - The three highest-level circuits (currently called "Double-A"), which remained active, demand a greater say in the minors' governance; the traditional "one league/one vote" rule has always given historically more numerous lower-level leagues leverage in decision-making. The Double-A loops back Shaughnessy, who secures the support of two other leagues and a seeming 5–4 advantage.
    - But Bramham rules that 15 non-operating circuits which have still paid dues remain eligible to vote; five of the leagues have given proxies. The controversial decision gives Bramham a landslide victory, backed by Commissioner Kenesaw Mountain Landis, quashing the rebellion.
  - Two celebrated left-handed pitchers are named to influential executive positions by National League clubs. The newly sold Philadelphia Phillies hire Herb Pennock, who won 241 games in his 23-year career, as their general manager, and the New York Giants announce the retirement of Carl Hubbell as an active player and appoint him director of the club's farm system. Hubbell won 253 games in 16 years as the Giants' "Meal Ticket".
- December 3 – On the final day of the winter meetings, actor and political activist Paul Robeson and three journalists from the Black press are allowed for the first time to address major-league owners to urge the demise of the color line, the "gentleman's agreement" that enforces racial segregation in "Organized Baseball." Their message is ignored. Landis insists: "Each club is free to employ Negro players to any extent it pleases and the matter is solely for each club's decision without any restrictions whatsoever."
- December 4 – After one disappointing season (only seven home runs in 117 games) for the Washington Senators, veteran right-handed slugger Bob Johnson is sent to the Boston Red Sox for cash considerations. Washington owner Clark Griffith will later call this the worst trade he ever made. Johnson, 38, will enjoy two solid years playing home games in Fenway Park before retiring.
- December 9 – First baseman Dolph Camilli, who refused to report to the New York Giants when he was traded to them on July 31, is dealt to the Oakland Oaks of the Pacific Coast League for infielder Bill Rigney, 25, currently in military service. Camilli, 36, is a native of the San Francisco Bay Area.
- December 13 – Bobo Newsom changes teams for the fourth time in 1943, when the Washington Senators trade the itinerant hurler to the Philadelphia Athletics for fellow right-hander Roger Wolff.
- December 30 – In a "Babe-for-Babe" deal, the Pittsburgh Pirates acquire first baseman Babe Dahlgren from the Philadelphia Phillies for the rights to portly catcher Babe Phelps, who had sat out the 1943 season. Dahlgren will appear in 157 games for the 1944 Pirates and drive home 101 runs; Phelps remains at his Maryland home and never reports to the Phillies.

== Births ==
=== January ===
- January 1 – Bud Hollowell, American baseball player and manager (d. 2014)
- January 3:
  - Adrian Garrett (d. 2021)
  - Bob Gebhard
- January 4 – Larry Yellen (d. 2023)
- January 7 – Dave Gray (d. 2020)
- January 10 – Jim Campbell (d. 2024)
- January 14:
  - Ron Clark
  - Dave Marshall (d. 2019)
- January 15 – Mike Marshall (d. 2021)
- January 25 – Brian McCall
- January 26 – César Gutiérrez (d. 2005)
- January 27 – Doug Adams
- January 30 – Davey Johnson (d. 2025)

=== February ===
- February 1 – Ron Woods
- February 8 – Bob Oliver (d. 2020)
- February 12 – Paul Edmondson (d. 1970)
- February 14 – Darrell Osteen (d. 2017)
- February 15:
  - Don Arlich
  - Joe Moeller
- February 16 – Bobby Darwin
- February 19:
  - Jim Cosman (d. 2013)
  - Gail Hopkins
- February 21:
  - Jack Billingham
  - Joe Foy (d. 1989)

=== March ===
- March 3:
  - Jack DiLauro (d. 2024)
  - Paul Schaal (d. 2017)
  - Ed Sukla (d. 2015)
- March 16 – Rick Reichardt
- March 20 – Steve Dillon
- March 23:
  - Bruce Howard
  - Lee May (d. 2017)

=== April ===
- April 1 – Mike DeGerick
- April 3 – Barry Moore
- April 4 – Mike Epstein
- April 6 – Marty Pattin (d. 2018)
- April 8 – John Hiller
- April 9 – Roy Gleason
- April 12:
  - Vicente Romo
  - Ken Suarez (d. 2023)
- April 16 – Frank Fernández
- April 24:
  - Ivan Murrell (d. 2006)
  - Joe Verbanic
- April 25:
  - Bob Johnson
  - Lew Krausse Jr. (d. 2021)

=== May ===
- May 4 – Dick Nold
- May 5 – John Donaldson
- May 7 – Steve Whitaker
- May 20 – Dave McDonald (d. 2017)
- May 22:
  - Walt Hriniak
  - Tommy John
- May 31 – Jackie Brown (d. 2017)

=== June ===
- June 3 – Ron Keller
- June 6 – Merv Rettenmund (d. 2024)
- June 9 – Bruce Look
- June 12 – Sam Parrilla (d. 1994)
- June 13 – Masaaki Kitaru
- June 15 – Al Closter
- June 20 – Andy Etchebarren (d. 2019)
- June 25 – John Gelnar
- June 26 – Bill Robinson (d. 2007)
- June 27 – Rico Petrocelli

=== July ===
- July 5 – Curt Blefary (d. 2001)
- July 8 – George Culver
- July 9 – Mike Andrews
- July 12 – Ron Willis (d. 1977)
- July 15 – Dave Adlesh (d. 2016)
- July 21 – Jim Manning (d. 2020)
- July 28:
  - Dick Simpson
  - Ron Theobald (d. 2016)
- July 29 – Bill Whitby (d. 2016)
- July 31 – Billy Wynne

=== August ===
- August 1 – Jackie Warner
- August 2 – Tom Burgmeier
- August 5 – Nelson Briles (d. 2005)
- August 6 – Jim Hardin (d. 1991)
- August 8 – Jim Miles
- August 11 – Leroy Reams
- August 17 – Ken Turner (d. 2016)
- August 20 – Hal Kurtz
- August 21 – Félix Millán
- August 22 – José Arcia (d. 2016)
- August 23:
  - Ed Barnowski (d. 2017)
  - Al Montreuil (d. 2008)
- August 28 – Lou Piniella
- August 29 – Randy Brown (d. 1998)

=== September ===
- September 1 – Fred Rath Sr.
- September 2 – Luke Walker
- September 4 – Bobby Guindon (d. 2023)
- September 5 – Dave Morehead (d. 2025)
- September 6 – Jim Quick
- September 7 – Tommy Matchick (d. 2022)
- September 12 – Floyd Wicker
- September 19:
  - Mike Derrick (d. 2009)
  - Joe Morgan (d. 2020)
- September 20 – Rich Morales
- September 23:
  - Winston Llenas
  - Marcelino López (d. 2001)

=== October ===
- October 2 – Paul Dicken
- October 4 – Jimy Williams (d. 2024)
- October 6:
  - Jim McGlothlin (d. 1975)
  - Jerry Stephenson (d. 2010)
- October 7 – José Cardenal
- October 8 – Don Pepper
- October 13 – Jerry Robertson (d. 1996)
- October 19:
  - Sandy Alomar Sr. (d. 2025)
  - Brock Davis
- October 20 – Bobby Floyd
- October 22 – Bobby Mitchell (d. 2019)
- October 31:
  - John Hoffman (d. 2001)
  - Fred Klages (d. 2023)
  - Bill Voss (d. 2023)

=== November ===
- November 4 – Dick Selma (d. 2001)
- November 9 – Jerry Weinstein
- November 12 – Al Schmelz
- November 13 – Bobby Pfeil
- November 14 – Danny Lazar
- November 16 – Greg Bollo
- November 17 – Bruce Von Hoff (d. 2012)
- November 18:
  - Dick Joyce (d. 2007)
  - Jim Shellenback
- November 19 – Aurelio Monteagudo (d. 1990)
- November 21 – Daryl Patterson (d. 2025)
- November 22 – Wade Blasingame
- November 24 – Billy Harris (d. 2020)
- November 29 – Dan McGinn (d. 2023)

=== December ===
- December 3 – Jerry Johnson (d. 2021)
- December 9 – Jim Merritt
- December 10 – Dalton Jones
- December 12 – Derrell Griffith
- December 13 – Tony Torchia (d. 2021)
- December 14 – Jerry May (d. 1996)
- December 19 – Walt Williams (d. 2016)
- December 20 – John Noriega (d. 2001)
- December 23:
  - Ron Allen
  - Dave May (d. 2021)
- December 24 – Al Stanek (d. 2018)
- December 25 – Dennis Musgraves
- December 27 – Roy White

== Deaths ==
=== January ===
- January 3 – Bid McPhee, 83, Hall-of-Fame second baseman who spent his entire 18-year career with the Cincinnati Reds, beginning in 1882 when the franchise played in the American Association as the Red Stockings; widely regarded as one of the best defensive second basemen of the 19th century, even though he took the field without a glove; retired in 1899 with a career .272 batting average, 2,258 hits, 1,684 runs, 189 triples, 568 stolen bases and a .944 fielding average; managed the Reds from 1901 through July 10, 1902, compiling a 79–124–4 record.
- January 4 – Jack Rafter, 67, catcher who played for the Pittsburgh Pirates in 1904.
- January 7 – Ted Welch, 50, who appeared in three games as a relief pitcher for the St. Louis Terriers of the "outlaw" Federal League in 1914.
- January 8 – John Titus, 66, outfielder who played from 1903 through 1912 with the Philadelphia Phillies and Boston Braves.
- January 12:
  - Pedro San, 48, believed to be the first man from the Dominican Republic to play in the U.S. Negro leagues as a member of the Cuban Stars East (1926–1928).
  - Bill Webb, 47, whose professional career lasted for 14 seasons, beginning as a second baseman for the Pittsburgh Pirates in 1916 and ending in 1930; after managing in the minor leagues, served the Chicago White Sox as a coach and farm system director from 1935 until his death.
- January 21 – Jim Brown, 50, stalwart catcher for the Chicago American Giants of the Negro National League for 15 seasons between 1920 and 1937; two-time Negro World Series champion.
- January 23 – Farmer Weaver, 77, outfielder who played from 1888 to 1894 for the Louisville Colonels and Pittsburgh Pirates.
- January 24 – Pat O'Connell, 81, center fielder who played for the Baltimore Orioles of the American Association during 1886.

=== February ===
- February 3 – Jake Virtue, 77, first baseman who played from 1890 through 1894 for the Cleveland Spiders.
- February 4 – Frank Dwyer, 74, pitcher for five teams in a span of 12 years from 1888 to 1899, who posted a 176–152 record and a 3.85 ERA in 365 appearances, including two 20-win season, 12 shutouts and 270 complete games.
- February 7 – Floyd Ritter, 72, backup catcher for the 1890 Toledo Maumees of the American Association.
- February 8 – Dan Casey, 80, pitcher who posted a 96–90 record with a 2.18 earned run average for four teams in seven seasons from 1884 to 1890; twice won more than 20 games for the Philadelphia Quakers, and led the National League in 1887 in both ERA (2.86) and shutouts (four).
- February 11 – Ralph McLaurin, 57, fourth outfielder for the 1908 St. Louis Cardinals.
- February 12 – Bart Cantz, 83, catcher who played from 1888 through 1890 with the Baltimore Orioles and the Philadelphia Athletics of the American Association.
- February 15 – John Deering, pitcher who played in 1903 with the Detroit Tigers and the New York Highlanders of the American League.
- February 17 – Hippo Galloway, 60, turn-of-the-century player for the Cuban X-Giants, considered the first black Canadian to play organized baseball.
- February 20 – Lafayette Dumas, 22, outfielder/pitcher for the 1940–1941 Memphis Red Sox of the Negro American League.

Jimmy Collins

=== March ===
- March 2 – Earle Gardner, 59, backup infielder who played from 1908 through 1912 for the New York Highlanders of the American League.
- March 3 – Bill Whaley, 44, outfielder for the 1923 St. Louis Browns.
- March 6 – Jimmy Collins, 73, Hall-of-Fame third baseman and manager who spent the majority of his 14-year major league career in Boston with the Beaneaters (1895–1900) and Americans (1901–1907); known for defensive brilliance as a third baseman, developing the barehanded pickup to defend against bunts and setting a National League record with 601 total chances accepted (1899); led his league in putouts five times, assists four times, double plays twice, and still stands second all-time in career putouts at third base; a .300 hitter five times (including .346 in 1897), he led NL home runs (1898), drove in over 100 runs twice, and scored more than 100 runs four times; managed the Americans to two AL pennants: defeating the Pittsburgh Pirates in the first modern World Series in 1903, then repeating as AL champs in 1904, when the NL's New York Giants refused to play a World Series.
- March 8 – Bill Riggins, 43, shortstop/third baseman who anchored the infield of the Detroit Stars of the Negro National League between 1920 and 1926, and briefly managed the Stars during his final season in Detroit.
- March 13 – Earl Smith, 52, corner outfielder and third baseman for the Chicago Cubs, St. Louis Browns and Washington Senators in seven seasons from 1916 through 1923.
- March 14 – Bubbles Anderson, 38, second baseman for four Negro leagues teams, including the Kansas City Monarchs, between 1922 and 1925.
- March 20 – Heinie Wagner, 62, shortstop who played for the New York Giants and the Boston Red Sox in a span of 14 seasons from 1902 to 1918, and later managed the Red Sox in 1930.
- March 21 – Joe Daly, 74, outfielder and catcher for the Philadelphia Athletics, Cleveland Spiders and Boston Beaneaters during three seasons from 1890 to 1892.
- March 30 – Tex McDonald, 52, right fielder who played from 1912 to 1913 with the Cincinnati Reds and Boston Braves of the National League, and for the Pittsburgh Rebels and Buffalo Buffeds/Blues of the Federal League from 1914 to 1915.

=== April ===
- April 1 – Pat Deasley, 85, Irish bare-handed catcher who played from 1881 through 1888 for the Boston Red Caps, St. Louis Browns, New York Giants and Washington Nationals.
- April 11 – Tom Knowlson, 47, pitcher for the 1915 Philadelphia Athletics.
- April 22 – Kirby White, 59, pitcher for the Boston Doves and Pittsburgh Pirates from 1909 to 1911.
- April 23 – Cliff Curtis, 61, pitcher who played for the Boston Doves/Rustlers, Chicago Cubs, Philadelphia Phillies and Brooklyn Dodgers from 1909 to 1913.
- April 26:
  - Bob Emslie, 84, Canadian umpire who set records with 35 seasons (34 of them, 1891 to 1924, in the National League) of officiating and over 1,000 games worked single-handedly; previously, as a pitcher, won 32 games for the 1884 Baltimore Orioles of the American Association; elected in 1986 to Canadian Baseball Hall of Fame.
  - Gene McCann, 66, pitcher for the Brooklyn Superbas in the 1901 and 1902 seasons.
- April 28 – Dennis Berran, 55, outfielder for the 1912 Chicago White Sox.
- April 29 – Elijah Jones, 61, pitcher who played for the Detroit Tigers in 1907 and 1909.

=== May ===
- May 6 – William J. Slocum, 59, sportswriter and editor for several New York newspapers since 1910.
- May 7 – Bill Coughlin, 64, infielder who played for the Washington Senators and Detroit Tigers in a span of nine seasons from 1899 to 1908; only man to play for the Senators' National League club in its final season of 1899 who joined the newly formed Senators for their 1901 inaugural season in the American League.
- May 10:
  - Ginger Clark, 64, pitcher who played for the 1902 Cleveland Bronchos of the American League.
  - Joe Werrick, 81, third baseman who for the St. Paul Saints of the Union Association in 1884 and the Louisville Colonels of the American Association from 1886 to 1888.
- May 13:
  - Jack Hendricks, 68, outfielder who played from 1902 to 1903 for the New York Giants, Chicago Orphans and Washington Senators; later managed the St. Louis Cardinals in 1918 and the Cincinnati Reds from 1924 to 1929.
  - Pat Malone, 40, pitcher who posted a 115–79 record for the 1928–1934 Chicago Cubs, then a 19–13 mark for the 1935–1937 New York Yankees; led National League in wins with 22 in 1929 and 20 in 1930; NL strikeout leader (with 166) in 1930; member of 1936 and 1937 World Series champions.
- May 14 – Bob Allen, 75, shortstop for the Philadelphia Phillies, Boston Beaneaters and Cincinnati Reds in five seasons spanning 1890–1897; managed 1890 Phillies (for 35 games) and 1900 Reds.
- May 22:
  - Red Bowser, 61, outfielder for the 1910 Chicago White Sox.
  - Bob Wood, 77, backup catcher for the Cincinnati Reds, Cleveland Blues, Cleveland Bronchos and Detroit Tigers in a span of seven seasons from 1898 to 1905.
- May 28 – Henri Rondeau, 56, outfielder and catcher whose 17-year professional baseball career included parts of three seasons in the majors for the 1913 Detroit Tigers and 1915–1916 Washington Senators; appeared in all or parts of 12 seasons with the minor-league Minneapolis Millers.
- May 29 – Pat Wright, 74, second baseman who played in one game for the Chicago Colts of the National League on July 11, 1890.

=== June ===
- June 14 – Fred Kommers, 57, outfielder who spent the 1913 season with the Pittsburgh Pirates of the National League, then jumped to the outlaw Federal League to play for the St. Louis Terriers and Baltimore Terrapins in 1914.
- June 19 – Art Goodwin, 67, pitcher who made one appearance with the New York Highlanders in 1905.
- June 21 – Chet Chadbourne, 58, outfielder who played 347 career games for the 1906–1907 Boston Americans, 1914–1915 Kansas City Packers (Federal League) and 1918 Boston Braves; as a minor-leaguer, collected 3,216 hits over 21 seasons and served as a manager and umpire.
- June 25 – Henry Milton, 32, four-time All-Star outfielder for the 1937–1940 Kansas City Monarchs of the Negro American League.
- June 30 – Mike McDermott, 80, pitcher who played from 1895 through 1897 for the Louisville Colonels, Cleveland Spiders and St. Louis Browns of the National League.

=== July ===
- July 12 – Bill McCall, 45, southpaw who hurled for seven Negro National League teams between 1922 and 1931; led NNL in games lost (13) in 1924.
- July 14 – George Pechiney, 81, pitcher who played from 1885 to 1897 for the Cleveland Blues and Cincinnati Red Stockings of the American Association.
- July 26 – Tom Gettinger, 74, outfielder who played from 1889 to 1890 with the St. Louis Brown Stockings, and then for the Louisville Colonels in 1895.
- July 30 – Charlie Fritz, 61, pitcher who played for the 1907 Philadelphia Athletics.

Joe Kelley

=== August ===
- August 11 – Fred Woodcock, 75, pitcher for the 1892 Pittsburgh Pirates of the National League.
- August 14 – Joe Kelley, 71, Hall-of-Fame outfielder who, along with John McGraw, Willie Keeler and Hughie Jennings, made up the "Big Four" of the great Baltimore Orioles teams of the middle 1890s; member of six pennant-winning teams during his 17-year stint in the major leagues; finished with a .317 career batting average, 443 stolen bases, .402 on-base percentage and 194 triples, drove in 100 or more runs five straight seasons (1894–1898), and scored over 100 runs six times; in the field, posted 212 outfield assists, 41st all-time.
- August 15 – Art Whitney, 85, third baseman and shortstop who played for eight teams during eleven seasons from 1880 to 1891; member of the New York Giants clubs that won the World Series in 1888 and 1889.
- August 16 – Beals Becker, 57, outfielder for five teams between 1908 and 1915; a dangerous slugger who four times ranked among the Top Ten in home runs in the National League; the first player to hit two pinch-hit home runs in a single season, and the first to hit two inside-the-park homers in the same game.
- August 27 – Frank Truesdale, 59, second baseman who played from 1910 to 1918 for the St. Louis Browns, New York Yankees and Boston Red Sox.

=== September ===
- September 1:
  - Joe Connolly, 59, left fielder for the Boston Braves from 1913 through 1916; member of the 1914 "Miracle Braves" World Series champions.
  - Eddie Matteson, 58, pitcher for the 1914 Philadelphia Phillies and 1918 Washington Senators.
- September 4 – Harry Hardy, 67, pitcher for the Washington Senators in 1905 and 1906.
- September 5 – Cecil Ferguson, 60, pitcher for the New York Giants and the Boston Doves/Rustlers from 1906 to 1911, who led the National League in saves in 1906.
- September 11 – Blaine Durbin, 57, pitcher who played from 1907 to 1909 with the Chicago Cubs, Cincinnati Reds and Pittsburgh Pirates.
- September 14:
  - John W. O'Neil, 69, catcher who appeared in four games for the 1899 and 1902 New York Giants.
  - Bill Murray, 50, second baseman for the 1917 Washington Senators.
- September 22 – Larry Hesterfer, 65, pitcher who appeared in one game for the New York Giants on September 5, 1901, and the only player to hit into a triple play in his first at bat in MLB history.
- September 27 – Willie Hudson, 25, pitcher/outfielder/first baseman for the Kansas City Monarchs and Chicago American Giants of the Negro American League from 1939 to 1942.

=== October ===
- October 10 – Harry Vahrenhorst, 58, who pinch hit in one game for the St. Louis Browns of the American League on September 21, 1904.
- October 15 – Joe Rickert, 66, outfielder who played for the Pittsburgh Pirates in 1898 and Boston Beaneaters in 1901.
- October 23 – Heinie Peitz, 72, catcher for four teams in a span of 16 seasons from 1892 to 1913, who formed half of the "Pretzel Battery" with pitcher Ted Breitenstein while playing for the National League's St. Louis Browns and Cincinnati Reds during the 1890s.
- October 28 – Otto Briggs, 52, outfielder whose career in Black baseball extended from 1915 through 1934 and included five productive seasons (1923–1927) with the Hilldale Club of the Eastern Colored League; member, 1925 Negro World Series champions; also a manager (1927, 1934).
- October 30 – Frank Whitney, 87, outfielder who appeared in 34 games for the Boston Red Caps during the National League's debut season, 1876.

=== November ===
- November 7 – Bill Wolff, 67, pitcher for the 1902 Philadelphia Phillies.
- November 10 – Charlie Bastian, 71, shortstop who played for seven teams in four different Major Leagues during eight seasons spanning 1884–1891.
- November 12 – George Meyers, 78, shortstop for the 1890 Philadelphia Athletics of the American Association.
- November 16 – Frank McPartlin, 71, pitcher for the 1899 New York Giants.
- November 17 – Morten Clark, 53, shortstop/third baseman in Black baseball between 1910 and 1924 who played for the Atlanta Black Crackers (1920–1922) and Baltimore Black Sox (1923).

=== December ===
- December 3 – Mike Grady, 73, catcher who played for the Philadelphia Phillies, St. Louis Browns, New York Giants, Washington Senators and St. Louis Cardinals, during 11 seasons between 1894 and 1906.
- December 6:
  - Charley Hall, 59, who pitched for the Cincinnati Reds, Boston Red Sox, St. Louis Cardinals and Detroit Tigers in nine seasons between 1906 and 1918; a member of the 1912 world-champion Red Sox.
  - George Magoon, 68, middle infielder who played in the National League with the Brooklyn Bridegrooms, Baltimore Orioles, Chicago Orphans and Cincinnati Reds, and for the American League's Chicago White Sox, in from 1898 to 1903.
- December 10 – Jules Thomas, 56, outfielder in Black baseball between 1908 and 1926, including in 1923–1924 for the New York Lincoln Giants and Brooklyn Royal Giants of the Eastern Colored League.
- December 18 – Bill Conway, 82, catcher who entered the National League in 1884 with the Philadelphia Quakers, appearing in one game for them before playing seven games with the Baltimore Orioles in 1886.
- December 19 – Bill Bergen, 65, fine defensive catcher who played from 1901 through 1911 with the Cincinnati Reds and the Brooklyn Superbas/Dodgers.
- December 21:
  - Jim Cudworth, 85, outfielder and first baseman for the Kansas City Cowboys of the Union Association in 1884.
  - Jack Warner, 71, catcher for the Boston Beaneaters, Louisville Colonels, New York Giants, Boston Americans, St. Louis Cardinals, Detroit Tigers and Washington Senators in 14 seasons from 1895 through 1908.
- December 22 – Ed Kent, 84, pitcher for Toledo of the American Association in 1884.
- December 28 – Steve Evans, 58, outfielder with the 1908 New York Giants and 1910–1913 St. Louis Cardinals and for the 1914–1915 Brooklyn Tip-Tops and 1915 Baltimore Terrapins of the Federal League.
