= John Dagenhard =

American baseball player (1917-2001)

- Pitcher
- Born: April 25, 1917; Magnolia, Ohio, U.S.
- Died: July 16, 2001 (aged 84); Bolivar, Ohio, U.S.
- Batted: Right Threw: Right

MLB debut
- September 28, 1943, for the Boston Braves

Last MLB appearance
- October 3, 1943, for the Boston Braves

MLB statistics
- Win–loss record: 1–0
- Earned run average: 0.00
- Strikeouts: 2
- Stats at Baseball Reference

Teams
- Boston Braves (1943)

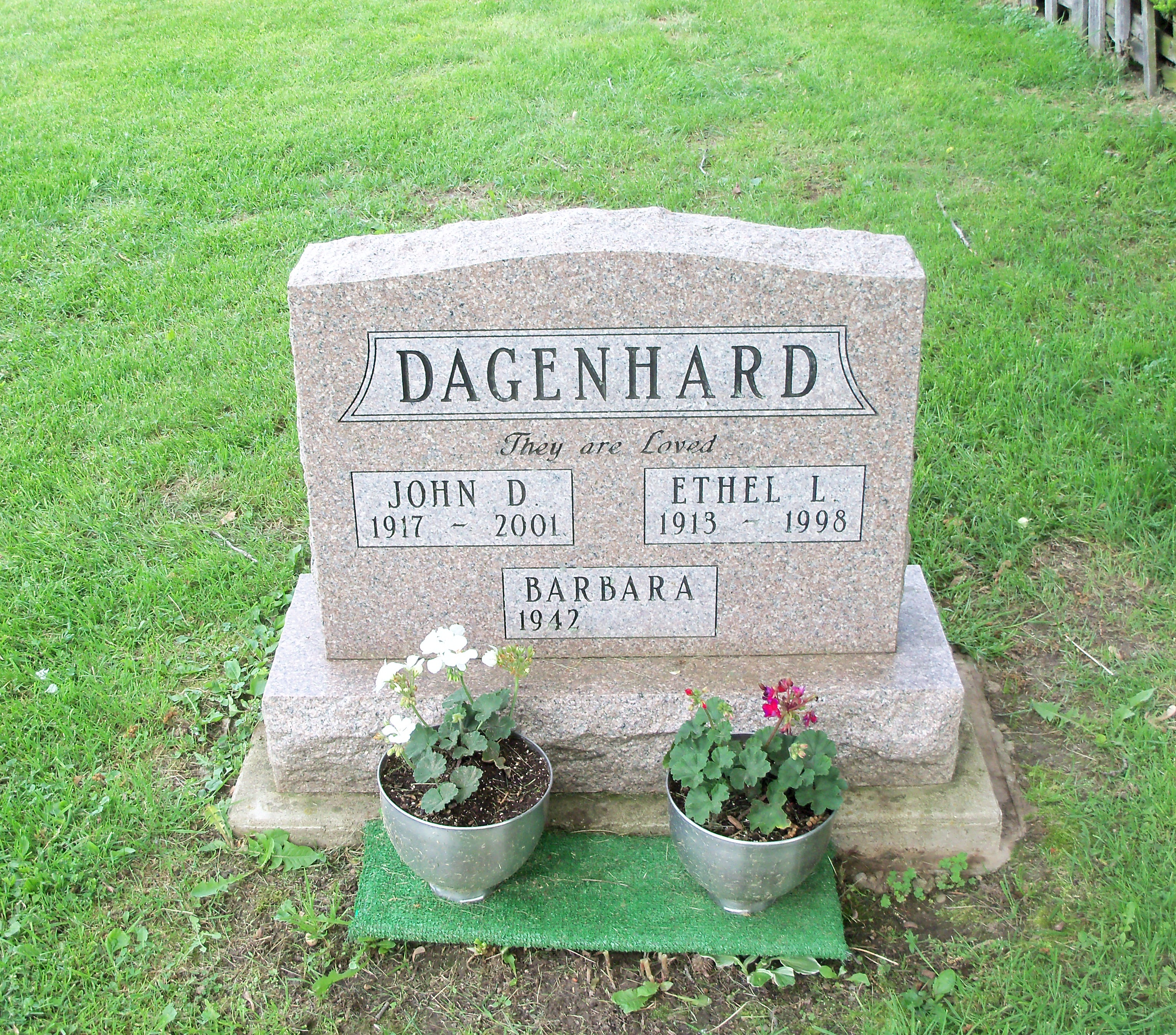
Tombstone at Magnolia Cemetery

John Douglas Dagenhard (April 25, 1917 – July 16, 2001) was an American Major League Baseball pitcher. The 6 ft 2 in (1.88 m), 195 lb (88 kg) right-hander appeared in two games for the Boston Braves at the end of the 1943 season.

Dagenhard is one of many ballplayers who only appeared in the major leagues during World War II. He made his major league debut on September 28, 1943, and pitched scoreless relief in a doubleheader against the St. Louis Cardinals at Sportsman's Park.

On October 3, 1943, he was the starting pitcher in the second game of a doubleheader against the Chicago Cubs at Wrigley Field, the final game of the season. He pitched a complete game and the Braves won, 5–2. Both runs were unearned.

Prior to his MLB debut, Dagenhard played two seasons in the Class A Eastern League. He recorded a 26-26 win-loss record with an ERA of 4.27. There is no record of Dagenhard playing professional baseball after 1943.
