= Bill Whaley =

American baseball player (1896–1943)

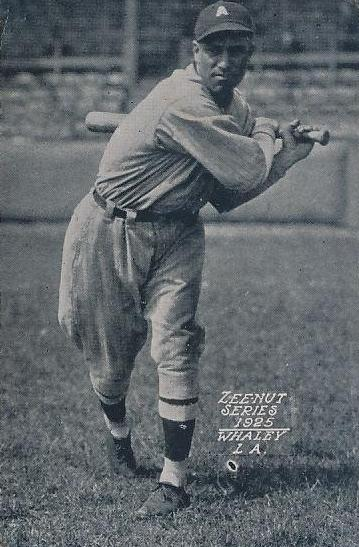
- Outfielder / Pinch hitter
- Born: February 10, 1896; Indianapolis, Indiana, U.S.
- Died: March 3, 1943 (aged 47); Indianapolis, Indiana, U.S.
- Batted: Right Threw: Right

MLB debut
- April 18, 1923, for the St. Louis Browns

Last MLB appearance
- October 6, 1923, for the St. Louis Browns

MLB statistics
- Batting average: .240
- Home runs: 0
- Runs batted in: 1
- Stats at Baseball Reference

Teams
- St. Louis Browns (1923)

William Carl Whaley (February 10, 1896 – March 3, 1943) was an American Major League Baseball player. He played in the outfield and was 5 foot 11 and 178 pounds.

== Career ==
Whaley's Major League debut was on April 16, 1923. He played just one season in the league, as a member of the St. Louis Browns in 1923. In 23 career games, he had 12 hits with an average of .240. He had no home runs, 1 RBI, and 5 runs scored. His final career game was on October 6, 1923.

== Early life ==
William "Bill" Carl Whaley was born 10 February 1896 in Indianapolis, Indiana. His mother was Anna Schissel (1874–1936). She married Frank Walter Whaley (1869–1955) 27 October 1900 in Indianapolis, Indiana. The family story was that Elias Whaley, Frank's father, went to Indianapolis from California and broke up the marriage and brought Frank back to California and that this was not Frank Walter Whaley's son however Bill took the surname of Whaley.

== Family ==
Bill married Miss Jessie Graves 3 November 1925 in Los Angeles, California. He married a second time to Ann Daly (1907 - 1957) 23 June 1935 in Indianapolis, Indiana.

== Death and Burial ==
Whaley died on March 3, 1943, in Indianapolis. He was buried at Crown Hill Cemetery and Arboretum, Section 233, Lot 88.
