= Glen Stewart =

American baseball player (1912-1997)

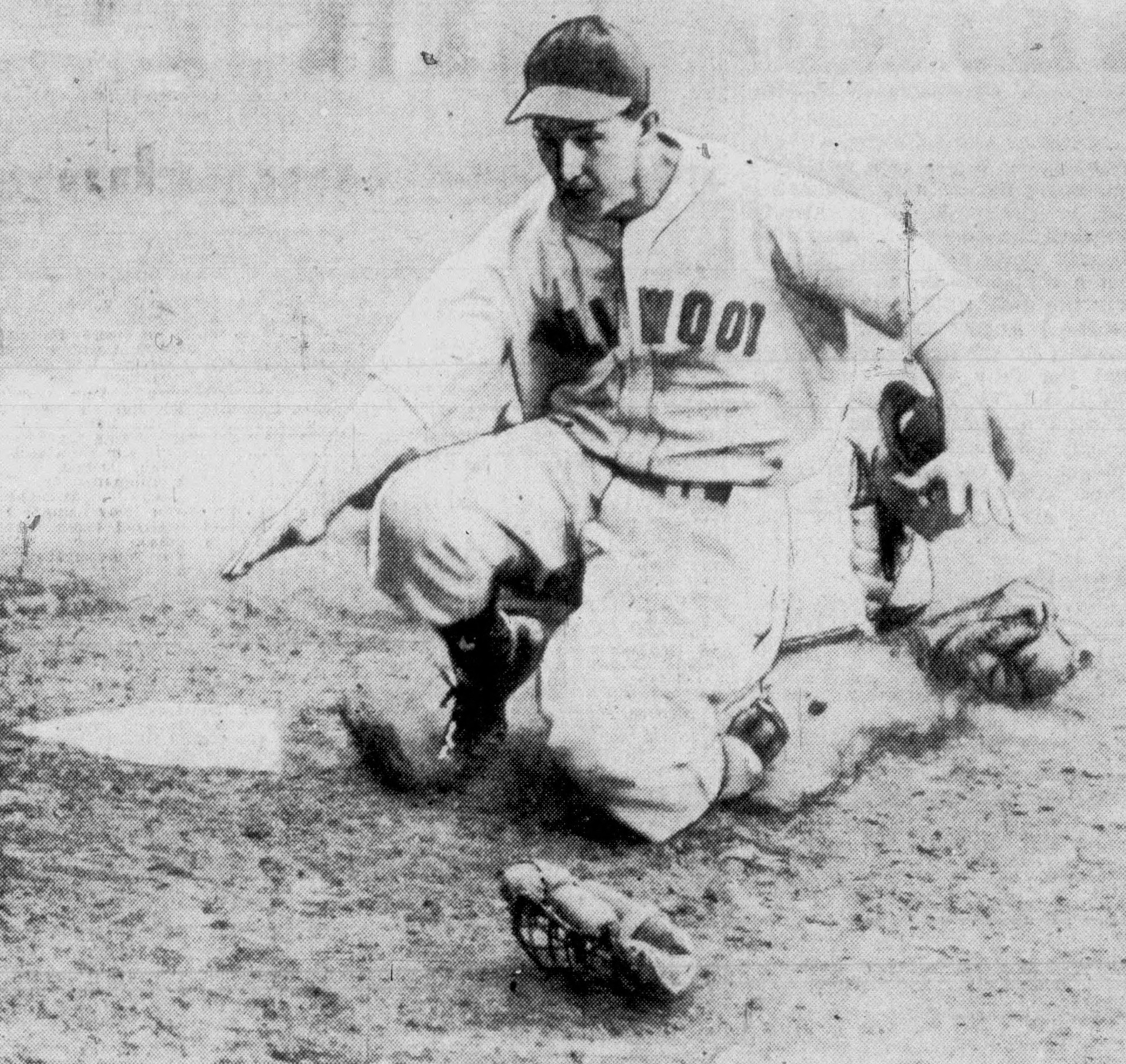
- Stewart (center) is called safe at home after colliding with Los Angeles Angels catcher Joe Stephenson (right, behind Stewart).
- Infielder
- Born: September 29, 1912; Tullahoma, Tennessee, US
- Died: February 11, 1997 (aged 84); Memphis, Tennessee, US
- Batted: Right Threw: Right

MLB debut
- June 26, 1940, for the New York Giants

Last MLB appearance
- October 1, 1944, for the Philadelphia Phillies

MLB statistics
- Batting average: .213
- Home runs: 2
- Runs scored: 56
- Runs batted in: 53
- Stats at Baseball Reference

Teams
- New York Giants (1940); Philadelphia Phillies (1943–1944)

Glen Weldon Stewart (September 29, 1912 – February 11, 1997) was an American Major League Baseball infielder. He played all or part of three seasons in the majors, between 1940 and 1943–1944, for the New York Giants and Philadelphia Phillies.

== Sources ==
- Career statistics from MLB · Baseball Reference · Baseball Reference (Minors) · Retrosheet · Baseball Almanac
