= Roy Talcott =

American baseball player

- Pitcher
- Born: January 16, 1920; Brookline, Massachusetts, U.S.
- Died: December 6, 1999 (aged 79); Miami, Florida, U.S.
- Batted: Right Threw: Right

MLB debut
- June 24, 1943, for the Boston Braves

Last MLB appearance
- June 24, 1943, for the Boston Braves

MLB statistics
- Games played: 1
- Innings pitched: 2/3
- Earned run average: 27.00
- Stats at Baseball Reference

Teams
- Boston Braves (1943)

Leroy Everett Talcott (January 16, 1920 – December 6, 1999) was an American pitcher in Major League Baseball. He played in only one game for the Boston Braves on June 24, 1943.

Talcott pitched at Princeton University while a student, and signed with the Boston Braves in 1943 after graduation. After two-thirds of an inning in his first game, he received a shoulder injury which ended his baseball career. He served in World War II and then became a doctor in Miami, Florida.
