= Carl Lindquist (baseball) =

American baseball player (1919–2001)

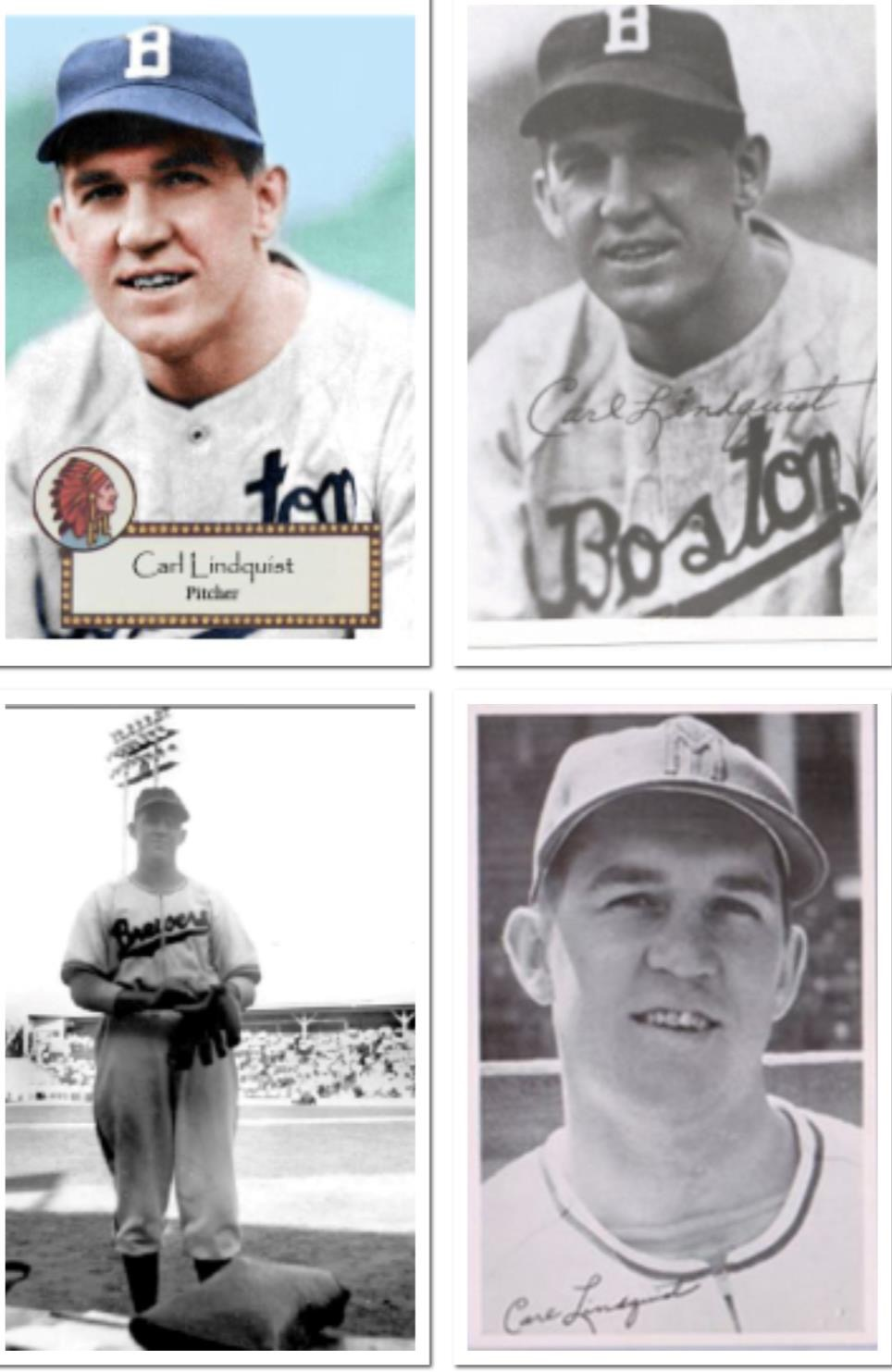
- Pitcher
- Born: May 9, 1919; Morris Run, Pennsylvania
- Died: September 3, 2001 (aged 82); Blossburg, Pennsylvania
- Batted: Right Threw: Right

MLB debut
- September 27, 1943, for the Boston Braves

Last MLB appearance
- June 4, 1944, for the Boston Braves

MLB statistics
- Win–loss record: 0–2
- Earned run average: 4.98
- Strikeouts: 5
- Stats at Baseball Reference

Teams
- Boston Braves (1943–1944)

Carl Emil Lindquist (May 9, 1919 – September 3, 2001) was a pitcher in Major League Baseball. He played for the Boston Braves.
