= Mike McDermott (baseball) =

American baseball player (1874–1943)

- Pitcher
- Born: September 7, 1874; St. Louis, Missouri, U.S.
- Died: June 30, 1943 (aged 80); St. Louis, Missouri, U.S.
- Batted: Unknown Threw: Left

MLB debut
- April 20, 1895, for the Louisville Colonels

Last MLB appearance
- July 31, 1897, for the St. Louis Browns

MLB statistics
- Win–loss record: 11–33
- Strikeouts: 69
- Earned run average: 6.17
- Stats at Baseball Reference

Teams
- Louisville Colonels (1895–1896); Cleveland Spiders (1897); St. Louis Browns (1897)

Michael Joseph McDermott (September 7, 1874 in St. Louis, Missouri – June 30, 1943 in St. Louis, Missouri), was an American Major League Baseball pitcher. He played three seasons in the majors, 1895-1897, for the Louisville Colonels, Cleveland Spiders and St. Louis Browns.
