= Lafayette Dumas =

American baseball player

- Outfielder
- Born: March 20, 1920; Muskogee, Oklahoma, U.S.
- Died: February 20, 1943 (aged 22)

Negro league baseball debut
- 1940, for the Memphis Red Sox

Last appearance
- 1941, for the Memphis Red Sox
- Stats at Baseball Reference

Teams
- Memphis Red Sox (1940–1941)

Lafayette Napoleon Dumas (March 20, 1920 – February 20, 1943) was an American Negro league outfielder in the 1940s.

A native of Muskogee, Oklahoma, Dumas played for the Memphis Red Sox in 1940 and 1941. In his 14 recorded games, he posted ten hits with a home run and three RBI in 40 plate appearances. Dumas died in 1943 at age 22.
