= Dain Clay =

American baseball player (1919–1994)

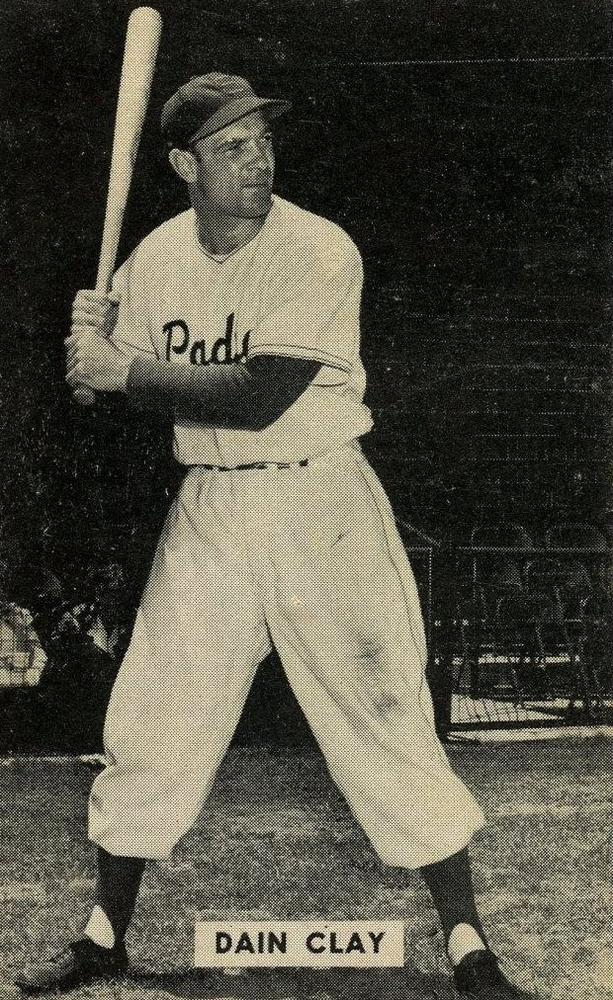
- Outfielder
- Born: July 10, 1919; Hicksville, Ohio, U.S.
- Died: August 28, 1994 (aged 75); Chula Vista, California, U.S.
- Batted: Right Threw: Right

MLB debut
- June 12, 1943, for the Cincinnati Reds

Last MLB appearance
- September 29, 1946, for the Cincinnati Reds

MLB statistics
- Batting average: .258
- Home runs: 3
- Runs batted in: 98
- Stats at Baseball Reference

Teams
- Cincinnati Reds (1943–1946)

Dain Elmer Clay (July 10, 1919 – August 28, 1994) was an American Major League Baseball outfielder. He played for the Cincinnati Reds of the National League. Clay played collegiately at Kent State University in 1943. He played in four seasons with the Reds, from 1943 to 1946. In 1945, Clay led the National League in at-bats with 656, and was sixth in games played, with 153. In 433 games, Clay was a .258 career hitter (397-for-1540) with 3 home runs and 98 runs batted in.
