= 1935 New York Giants (MLB) season =

1935 New York Giants
- League: National League
- Ballpark: Polo Grounds
- City: New York City
- Record: 91–62 (.595)
- League place: 3rd
- Owners: Charles Stoneham
- Managers: Bill Terry

The 1935 New York Giants season was the franchise's 53rd season. The team finished in third place in the National League with a 91–62 record, 8½ games behind the Chicago Cubs.

== Offseason ==
- November 1, 1934: Johnny Vergez, Pretzel Pezzullo, Blondy Ryan, George Watkins and cash were traded by the Giants to the Philadelphia Phillies for Dick Bartell.
- December 12, 1934: Jack Salveson was traded by the Giants to the Pittsburgh Pirates for Leon Chagnon.

== Regular season ==
=== Season standings ===
National League
Team	W	L	Pct.	GB	Home	Road
Chicago Cubs	100	54	.649	—	56‍–‍21	44‍–‍33
St. Louis Cardinals	96	58	.623	4	53‍–‍24	43‍–‍34
New York Giants	91	62	.595	8½	50‍–‍27	41‍–‍35
Pittsburgh Pirates	86	67	.562	13½	46‍–‍31	40‍–‍36
Brooklyn Dodgers	70	83	.458	29½	38‍–‍38	32‍–‍45
Cincinnati Reds	68	85	.444	31½	41‍–‍35	27‍–‍50
Philadelphia Phillies	64	89	.418	35½	35‍–‍43	29‍–‍46
Boston Braves	38	115	.248	61½	25‍–‍50	13‍–‍65

=== Record vs. opponents ===
1935 National League record Sources:
Team	BSN	BRO	CHC	CIN	NYG	PHI	PIT	STL
Boston	—	6–16	3–19	10–12	5–16	8–14	2–20	4–18
Brooklyn	16–6	—	5–17	11–11	9–13	12–9–1	11–11	6–16
Chicago	19–3	17–5	—	14–8	14–8	13–9	15–7	8–14
Cincinnati	12–10	11–11	8–14	—	8–14–1	13–9	8–13	8–14
New York	16–5	13–9	8–14	14–8–1	—	12–10–2	14–8	14–8
Philadelphia	14–8	9–12–1	9–13	9–13	10–12–2	—	6–16	7–15
Pittsburgh	20–2	11–11	7–15	13–8	8–14	16–6	—	11–11
St. Louis	18–4	16–6	14–8	14–8	8–14	15–7	11–11	—

=== Notable transactions ===
- June 22, 1935: Jimmy Ripple was purchased by the Giants from the Montreal Royals.

=== Roster ===
1935 New York Giants
Roster
Pitchers: 33 Slick Castleman; 15 Leon Chagnon; 12 Freddie Fitzsimmons; 23 Frank Gabler; 1 Harry Gumbert; 11 Carl Hubbell; 20 Dolf Luque; 15 Euel Moore; 18 Roy Parmelee; 17 Hal Schumacher; 21 Al Smith; 14 Allyn Stout	Catchers: 10 Harry Danning; 8 Gus Mancuso; 9 Glenn Myatt; 9 Paul Richards; Infielders: 2 Dick Bartell; 6 Hughie Critz; 22 Al Cuccinello; 5 Travis Jackson; 23 Mark Koenig; 3 Bill Terry; 22 Phil Weintraub	Outfielders: 7 Kiddo Davis; 16 Hank Leiber; 1 Jo-Jo Moore; 4 Mel Ott; Other batters: 22 Joe Malay	Manager: 3 Bill Terry; Coaches: 31 Tommy Clarke; 32 Frank Snyder

== Player stats ==
=== Batting ===
==== Starters by position ====
Note: Pos = Position; G = Games played; AB = At bats; H = Hits; Avg. = Batting average; HR = Home runs; RBI = Runs batted in

Pos	Player	G	AB	H	Avg.	HR	RBI
C	Gus Mancuso	128	447	133	.298	5	56
1B	Bill Terry	145	596	203	.341	6	64
2B	Mark Koenig	107	396	112	.283	3	37
SS	Dick Bartell	137	539	141	.262	14	53
3B	Travis Jackson	128	511	154	.301	9	80
OF	Mel Ott	152	593	191	.322	31	114
OF	Jo-Jo Moore	155	681	201	.295	15	71
OF	Hank Leiber	154	613	203	.331	22	107

==== Other batters ====
Note: G = Games played; AB = At bats; H = Hits; Avg. = Batting average; HR = Home runs; RBI = Runs batted in

Player	G	AB	H	Avg.	HR	RBI
Hughie Critz	65	219	41	.187	2	14
Al Cuccinello	54	165	41	.248	4	20
Harry Danning	65	152	37	.243	2	20
Phil Weintraub	64	112	27	.241	1	6
Kiddo Davis	47	91	24	.264	2	6
Glenn Myatt	13	18	4	.222	1	6
Paul Richards	7	4	1	.250	0	0
Joe Malay	1	1	1	1.000	0	0

=== Pitching ===
==== Starting pitchers ====
Note: G = Games pitched; IP = Innings pitched; W = Wins; L = Losses; ERA = Earned run average; SO = Strikeouts

Player	G	IP	W	L	ERA	SO
Carl Hubbell	42	302.2	23	12	3.27	150
Hal Schumacher	33	261.2	19	9	2.89	79
Roy Parmelee	34	226.0	14	10	4.22	79
Slick Castleman	29	173.2	15	6	4.09	64
Freddie Fitzsimmons	18	94.0	4	8	4.02	23

==== Other pitchers ====
Note: G = Games pitched; IP = Innings pitched; W = Wins; L = Losses; ERA = Earned run average; SO = Strikeouts

Player	G	IP	W	L	ERA	SO
Al Smith	40	124.0	10	8	3.41	44
Harry Gumbert	6	23.2	1	2	6.08	11

==== Relief pitchers ====
Note: G = Games pitched; W = Wins; L = Losses; SV = Saves; ERA = Earned run average; SO = Strikeouts

Player	G	W	L	SV	ERA	SO
Allyn Stout	40	1	4	5	4.91	29
Frank Gabler	26	2	1	0	5.70	24
Leon Chagnon	14	0	2	1	3.52	16
Euel Moore	6	1	0	0	5.63	3
Dolf Luque	2	1	0	0	0.00	2

== Farm system ==
Level	Team	League	Manager
A	Nashville Vols	Southern Association	Frank Brazill and Johnny Butler
C	Tyler Trojans	West Dixie League	Wally Dashiell
D	Abbeville Athletics	Evangeline League	Jimmy Vorhoff
D	Tallahassee Capitols	Georgia–Florida League	Dutch Hoffman

LEAGUE CHAMPIONS: Tallahassee
