= 1935 Philadelphia Phillies season =

Major League Baseball season

1935 Philadelphia Phillies
- League: National League
- Ballpark: Baker Bowl
- City: Philadelphia
- Owners: Gerald Nugent
- Managers: Jimmie Wilson

The 1935 Philadelphia Phillies season was the 51st season in the history of the franchise.

== Offseason ==
- November 1, 1934: Dick Bartell was traded by the Phillies to the New York Giants for Johnny Vergez, Pretzel Pezzullo, Blondy Ryan, George Watkins and cash.

== Regular season ==
On July 27, 1935, José "Chile" Gómez made his major league debut with the Phillies and became the team's first Latin-born player.

=== Season standings ===
National League
Team	W	L	Pct.	GB	Home	Road
Chicago Cubs	100	54	.649	—	56‍–‍21	44‍–‍33
St. Louis Cardinals	96	58	.623	4	53‍–‍24	43‍–‍34
New York Giants	91	62	.595	8½	50‍–‍27	41‍–‍35
Pittsburgh Pirates	86	67	.562	13½	46‍–‍31	40‍–‍36
Brooklyn Dodgers	70	83	.458	29½	38‍–‍38	32‍–‍45
Cincinnati Reds	68	85	.444	31½	41‍–‍35	27‍–‍50
Philadelphia Phillies	64	89	.418	35½	35‍–‍43	29‍–‍46
Boston Braves	38	115	.248	61½	25‍–‍50	13‍–‍65

=== Record vs. opponents ===
1935 National League record Sources:
Team	BSN	BRO	CHC	CIN	NYG	PHI	PIT	STL
Boston	—	6–16	3–19	10–12	5–16	8–14	2–20	4–18
Brooklyn	16–6	—	5–17	11–11	9–13	12–9–1	11–11	6–16
Chicago	19–3	17–5	—	14–8	14–8	13–9	15–7	8–14
Cincinnati	12–10	11–11	8–14	—	8–14–1	13–9	8–13	8–14
New York	16–5	13–9	8–14	14–8–1	—	12–10–2	14–8	14–8
Philadelphia	14–8	9–12–1	9–13	9–13	10–12–2	—	6–16	7–15
Pittsburgh	20–2	11–11	7–15	13–8	8–14	16–6	—	11–11
St. Louis	18–4	16–6	14–8	14–8	8–14	15–7	11–11	—

=== Roster ===
1935 Philadelphia Phillies
Roster
Pitchers: 48 Jim Bivin; 46 Joe Bowman; 40 Phil Collins; 42 Curt Davis; 45 Snipe Hansen; 47 Syl Johnson; 32,44 Orville Jorgens; 11 Hal Kelleher; 43 Euel Moore; 40 Hugh Mulcahy; 49 Frank Pearce; 41 Pretzel Pezzullo; 45 Ray Prim; -- Tommy Thomas; 20 Bucky Walters	Catchers: 10 Joe Holden; 10 Bubber Jonnard; 11 Al Todd; 12 Jimmy Wilson; Infielders: 25 Art Bramhall; 24 Dolph Camilli; 25 Dino Chiozza; 21 Lou Chiozza; 22 Chile Gómez; 25,42 Mickey Haslin; 22 Blondy Ryan; 23 Johnny Vergez	Outfielders: 30 Ethan Allen; 34 Ed Boland; 34 Fred Lucas; 33 Johnny Moore; 31 George Watkins	Manager: 12 Jimmie Wilson; Coaches: 10 Bubber Jonnard; 50 Hans Lobert; 51 Dick Spalding

== Player stats ==
= Indicates team leader

=== Batting ===
==== Starters by position ====
Note: Pos = Position; G = Games played; AB = At bats; H = Hits; Avg. = Batting average; HR = Home runs; RBI = Runs batted in

Pos	Player	G	AB	H	Avg.	HR	RBI
C	Al Todd	107	328	95	.290	3	42
1B	Dolph Camilli	156	602	157	.261	25	83
2B	Lou Chiozza	124	472	134	.284	3	47
SS	Mickey Haslin	110	407	108	.265	3	52
3B	Johnny Vergez	148	546	136	.249	9	63
OF	Ethan Allen	156	645	198	.307	8	63
OF	George Watkins	150	600	162	.270	17	76
OF	Johnny Moore	153	600	194	.323	19	93

==== Other batters ====
Note: G = Games played; AB = At bats; H = Hits; Avg. = Batting average; HR = Home runs; RBI = Runs batted in

Player	G	AB	H	Avg.	HR	RBI
Jimmie Wilson	93	290	81	.279	1	37
Chile Gómez	67	222	51	.230	0	16
Blondy Ryan	39	129	34	.264	1	10
Ed Boland	30	47	10	.213	0	4
Fred Lucas	20	34	9	.265	0	2
Joe Holden	6	9	1	.111	0	0
Art Bramhall	2	1	0	.000	0	0
Bubber Jonnard	1	1	0	.000	0	0
Dino Chiozza	2	0	0	----	0	0

=== Pitching ===
==== Starting pitchers ====
Note: G = Games pitched; IP = Innings pitched; W = Wins; L = Losses; ERA = Earned run average; SO = Strikeouts

Player	G	IP	W	L	ERA	SO
Bucky Walters	24	151.0	9	9	4.17	40
Hal Kelleher	3	25.0	2	0	1.80	12
Phil Collins	3	14.2	0	2	11.66	4

==== Other pitchers ====
Note: G = Games pitched; IP = Innings pitched; W = Wins; L = Losses; ERA = Earned run average; SO = Strikeouts

Player	G	IP	W	L	ERA	SO
Curt Davis	44	231.0	16	14	3.66	74
Orville Jorgens	53	188.1	10	15	4.83	57
Syl Johnson	37	174.2	10	8	3.56	89
Jim Bivin	47	161.2	2	9	5.79	54
Joe Bowman	33	148.1	7	10	4.25	58
Ray Prim	29	73.1	3	4	5.77	27
Hugh Mulcahy	18	52.2	1	5	4.78	11
Euel Moore	15	40.1	1	6	7.81	15
Tommy Thomas	4	12.0	0	1	5.25	3
Snipe Hansen	2	4.1	0	1	12.46	0

==== Relief pitchers ====
Note: G = Games pitched; W = Wins; L = Losses; SV = Saves; ERA = Earned run average; SO = Strikeouts

Player	G	W	L	SV	ERA	SO
Pretzel Pezzullo	41	3	5	1	6.40	24
Frank Pearce	5	0	0	0	8.31	7

== Farm system ==
Level	Team	League	Manager
A	Hazleton Mountaineers	New York–Pennsylvania League	Andy High
