= List of Italian American sportspeople =

To be included in this list, the person must have a Wikipedia article showing they are Italian American sports people or must have references showing they are Italian American sports people and are notable.

== American football ==
- Jon Abbate (born 1985)
- Ray Abruzzese (1937–2011)
- Louis "Duke" Abbruzzi (1917–1982)
- Pasquale "Pat" Abbruzzi (1932–1998)
- Steve Addazio (born 1959)
- Nick Aliotti (born 1954)
- Nick Allegretti (born 1996)
- Lyle Alzado (1949–1992)
- Chuck Amato (born 1946)
- Alan Ameche (1933–1988)
- Danny Amendola (born 1985), coach for the Las Vegas Raiders
- Lou Anarumo (born 1966)
- Joe Andruzzi (born 1975)
- Alex Anzalone (born 1994)
- Bob Avellini (born 1953)
- Sisto Averno (1925–2012)
- Joe Avezzano (1943–2012)
- Al Bagnoli (born 1953), Penn Quakers Head coach 1992–2014
- Alex Balducci (born 1994)
- Marco Battaglia (born 1973)
- Bruno Banducci (1921–1985)
- Mark Bavaro (born 1963)
- Gary Beban (born 1946)
- Joe Bellino (1938–2019)
- Nick Bellore (born 1989)
- Mike Bellotti (born 1950)
- Angelo Bertelli (1921–1999)
- Rich Bisaccia (born 1960), Green Bay Packers coach
- Stephen Bisciotti (born 1960), NFL owner, Baltimore Ravens
- Joel Bitonio (born 1991)
- Steve Bono (born 1962)
- Joey Bosa (born 1995)
- John Bosa (born 1964)
- Nick Bosa (born 1997)
- Ryan Boschetti (born 1981)
- Tony Boselli (born 1972)
- Tedy Bruschi (born 1973) (Italian father)
- Doug Buffone (1944–2015)
- Nick Buoniconti (1940–2019)
- Grant Calcaterra (born 1998)
- Dave Campo (born 1947)
- Tony Canadeo (1919–2003)
- Gino Cappelletti (1934–2022)
- John Cappelletti (born 1952)
- Michael Caputo (American football) (born 1992)
- Jim Capuzzi (born 1932)
- Glenn Carano (born 1955)
- Frank Carideo (1908–1992)
- Joe Carollo (American football) (born 1940)
- Giovanni Carmazzi (born 1977)
- Tommy Casanova (born 1950)
- Mike Catapano (born 1990)
- Chandler Catanzaro (born 1991)
- Anthony Castonzo (born 1988)
- Jimmy Cefalo (born 1956)
- Darrin Chiaverini (born 1977)
- Dan Chisena
- Vinny Ciurciu (born 1980)
- Don Colo (1925–2019)
- Marc Colombo (born 1978)
- Chris Conte (born 1989)
- Enio Conti (1913–2005)
- Jon Corto (born 1984)
- Dave Costa (1941–2013)
- Blake Costanzo (born 1984)
- Jim Covert (born 1960)
- Carmen Cozza (1930–2018)
- Gary Cuozzo (born 1941)
- Joe Danelo (born 1953)
- Mark Dantonio (born 1956), Head Coach, Michigan State Spartans football. In 2015, he became the first head coach in Big Ten history to achieve at least 11 wins in 5 of 6 seasons.
- Edward J. DeBartolo Jr. (born 1946), NFL owner, San Francisco 49ers
- Denise DeBartolo York (born 1950), NFL owner, San Francisco 49ers
- Eric DeCosta (born 1971), NFL Scouting Director, Baltimore Ravens
- Dom DeCicco (born 1988)
- John DeFilippo (born 1978)
- Dave DeGuglielmo (born 1968)
- Jim Del Gaizo (born 1947)
- Al Del Greco (born 1962)
- Johnny Dell Isola (1912–1986)
- Robert Delpino (born 1965)
- Sam DeLuca (1936–2011)
- Tony DeLuca (1960–1999)
- Jerry DeLucca (1936–2017)
- Bob DeMarco (born 1938)
- Brian DeMarco (born 1972)
- Andrew DePaola (born 1987)
- Al DeRogatis (1927–1995)
- Dan DeSantis (1918–2004)
- Mike DeVito (born 1984)
- Tommy DeVito (born 1998)
- Bob Diaco (born 1973)
- John DiGiorgio (born 1982)
- Patrick DiMarco (born 1989)
- Ryan D'Imperio (born 1987)
- Gerry DiNardo (born 1952)
- Joe DiVito (born 1945)
- Aldo Donelli (1907–1994), American football and soccer player, and is a member of the National Soccer Hall of Fame. In 1941, he made American football history becoming thus far the only man to simultaneously coach both a National Football League team, the Pittsburgh Steelers, and a collegiate team, Duquesne Dukes. The latter would finish that season undefeated.
- Jason Fabini (born 1974)
- Vic Fangio (born 1958)
- Anthony Fasano (born 1984)
- Jon Feliciano (born 1992)
- Vince Ferragamo (born 1954)
- Jack Ferrante (1916–2006)
- Orlando Ferrante (born 1932)
- Frank Ferrara (born 1975)
- Joe Flacco (born 1985)
- Aldo Forte (1918–2007)
- Joe Fortunato (1930–2017)
- Rick Forzano (1928–2019)
- Troy Fumagalli (born 1995)
- Brandon Fusco (born 1988)
- Chuck Fusina (born 1957)
- Bob Gagliano (born 1958)
- Rafael Gaglianone
- John Gagliardi (1926–2018)
- Lu Gambino (1923–2003)
- Jimmy Garoppolo (born 1991)
- Al Gionfriddo (1922–2003)
- Matt Giordano (born 1982)
- Breno Giacomini (born 1985)
- John Greco (born 1985)
- Ralph Guglielmi (1933–2017)
- Jim Harbaugh (born 1963), His mother is of half-Sicilian
- John Harbaugh (born 1962), His mother is of half-Sicilian
- Franco Harris (born 1950) (Italian mother) best known for "Immaculate reception"
- Ted Hendricks (born 1947), Italian maternal grandparents
- Aaron Hernandez (1989–2017), Italian mother
- Cosmo Iacavazzi (born 1943)
- Richie Incognito (born 1983)
- Andy Isabella (born 1996)
- Larry Izzo (born 1974) (Italian father), linebacker and special teams captain for the New England Patriots
- Ryan Izzo (born 1995)
- Daryle Lamonica (born 1941)
- Sam LaPorta (born 2001)
- Dante Lavelli (1923–2009)
- Augie Lio (1918–1989)
- Tony Liscio (1940–2017)
- Lou Little (1893–1979)
- Vince Lombardi (1913–1970), legendary football coach
- Tom Longo (1942–2015)
- Rick Lovato (born 1992)
- Mike Lucci (born 1939)
- Ray Malavasi (1930–1987)
- Steve Maneri (born 1988)
- Dino Mangiero (born 1958)
- Eric Mangini (born 1971)
- Mark Mangino (born 1956)
- Gino Marchetti (1926–2019)
- Joe Marconi (1934–1992)
- Olindo Mare (born 1973)
- Marc Mariani (born 1987)
- Ed Marinaro (born 1950)
- Rod Marinelli (born 1949)
- Dan Marino (born 1961), Hall of Fame quarterback for the Miami Dolphins
- Steve Mariucci (born 1955)
- Doug Marrone (born 1964)
- Tom Masella (born 1959)
- Tim Mazzetti (born 1956)
- Franklin Mieuli (1920–2010), NFL owner, minority owner of the San Francisco 49ers
- Matt Milano (born 1994)
- Skip Minisi (1926–2005)
- Joe Montana (born 1956), widely considered one of the best quarterbacks in the history of the NFL
- Tony Morabito (1910–1957), NFL owner, San Francisco 49ers
- Zippy Morocco (1930–2016)
- George Musso (1910–2000)
- Johnny Musso (born 1950)
- Bill Narduzzi (1936–1988)
- Pat Narduzzi (born 1966), University of Pittsburgh Panthers head coach
- Leo Nomellini (1924–2000)
- Brock Olivo (born 1976)
- Bo Orlando (born 1966)
- Lou Palatella (born 1933)
- Chuck Pagano (born 1960)
- Bill Parcells (born 1941)
- Babe Parilli (1930–2017)
- Chet Parlavecchio (born 1960)
- Vincent Papale (born 1946)
- Dan Pastorini (born 1949)
- Joe Paterno (1926–2012), legendary football coach for Penn State
- Matt Patricia (born 1974)
- Bo Pelini (born 1967)
- Carl Pelini (born 1965)
- Joe Pellegrini (born 1957)
- Mike Pettine (born 1966)
- Ralph Perretta (born 1953)
- Vinny Perretta (born 1985)
- Rob Petitti (born 1982)
- Bobby Petrino (born 1961), Louisville Cardinals coach
- Paul Petrino (born 1967), Idaho Vandals coach
- Nick Pietrosante (1937–1988)
- Brian Piccolo (1943–1970)
- Lou Piccone (born 1949)
- Scott Pioli (born 1965)
- Sabby Piscitelli (born 1983)
- Vince Promuto (1938–2021)
- Travis Raciti (born 1992)
- Dave Ragone (born 1979)
- Dominic Raiola (born 1978)
- Donovan Raiola (born 1982)
- Andy Robustelli (1925–2011)
- Gene Ronzani (1909–1975)
- Sam Rutigliano (born 1933)
- Jay Saldi (born 1952)
- Joe Savoldi (1908–1974)
- Dante Scarnecchia (born 1948)
- Joe Scarpati (born 1943)
- Bob Scarpitto (born 1939)
- Greg Schiano (born 1966)
- Joe Scibelli (1939–1991)
- Joe Scudero (1930–2019)
- Mike Siani (born 1950)
- Dan Sileo (born 1964)
- Carl Silvestri (born 1943)
- Nico Siragusa (born 1994)
- Tony Siragusa (born 1967)
- Nick Sirianni (born 1981)
- Jim Sorgi (born 1980)
- John Spagnola (born 1957)
- Steve Spagnuolo (born 1959)
- Tony Sparano (1961–2018)
- Frank Spaziani (born 1947), Boston College coach
- Sal Sunseri (born 1959)
- Tino Sunseri (born 1988)
- Vinnie Sunseri (born 1993)
- Paul Tagliabue (born 1940), former NFL commissioner
- Bob Talamini (born 1939)
- Giorgio Tavecchio (born 1990), former NFL kicker
- Vinny Testaverde (born 1963)
- Jim Tomsula (born 1968)
- Gino Torretta (born 1970)
- Charley Trippi (born 1921)
- Frank Varrichione (1932–2018)
- Kenny Vaccaro (born 1991)
- Raymond Ventrone (born 1982)
- Ross Ventrone (born 1986)
- Dick Vermeil (born 1936), football coach
- Phil Villapiano (born 1949)
- Adam Vinatieri (born 1972), football kicker for Indianapolis
- Danny Vitale (born 1993)
- Frank Zombo (born 1987)
- Vic Zucco (born 1935)

== Athletes ==
- Ray Barbuti (1905–1988), athlete
- Abbey D'Agostino (born 1992)
- Andrew Howe (born 1985), athlete
- Bruno Pauletto (born 1954)
- Jenna Prandini (born 1992)
- Lindy Remigino (1931–2018)

== Beach volleyball ==
- Kerri Walsh Jennings (born 1978) (Italian great-grandfather)

== Baseball ==
- Ed Abbaticchio (1877–1957) (First Italian American to play in the major leagues using his real name, made his debut with the Philadelphia Phillies in 1897 and played for the Pittsburgh Pirates in the 1909 World Series)
- Jeremy Accardo (born 1981)
- Jim Adduci (baseball, born 1959) (born 1959)
- Joe Albanese (1933–2000)
- Chuck Aleno (1917–2003)
- Bob Allietta (born 1952)
- Dan Altavilla (born 1992)
- Joe Altobelli (1932–2021)
- Joey Amalfitano (born 1934)
- John Andreoli (born 1990)
- Matt Andriese (born 1989)
- Norm Angelini (1947–2019)
- Roman Anthony (born 2004)
- Sam Antonacci (born 2003)
- Johnny Antonelli (1930–2020)
- Matt Antonelli (born 1985)
- Bill Antonello (1927–1993)
- Rugger Ardizoia (1919–2015)
- Gerry Arrigo (born 1941)
- Bob Aspromonte (born 1938)
- Ken Aspromonte (born 1931)
- Mark Attanasio (born 1957), owner of the Milwaukee Brewers
- Rich Aurilia (born 1971)
- Harrison Bader (born 1994), Italian American mother
- Steve Balboni (born 1957)
- Rocco Baldelli (born 1981)
- Mike Balenti (1886–1955)
- Sal Bando (1944–2023)
- Daniel Barone (born 1983)
- Dick Barone (1932–2015)
- Johnny Barbato (born 1992)
- Tony Bartirome (1932–2018)
- Phil Barzilla (born 1979)
- Mark Belanger (1944–1998), Italian American mother
- Wayne Belardi (1930–1994)
- Zeke Bella (1930–2014)
- Andrew Bellatti (born 1991)
- Andrew Benintendi (born 1994)
- Johnny Berardino (1917–1996) (1939–1952, World Series 1948 Cleveland Indians)
- Augie Bergamo (1917–1974)
- Dale Berra (born 1956)
- Yogi Berra (1925–2015), born Lawrence Peter Berra. Former catcher and manager in Major League Baseball. Elected to National Baseball Hall of Fame in 1972. The Hanna-Barbera cartoon character Yogi Bear was named after— him.
- Frank Bertaina (1944–2010)
- Jon Berti (born 1990)
- Kurt Bevacqua (born 1947)
- Joe Biagini (born 1990)
- Buddy Biancalana (born 1960)
- Jeff Bianchi (born 1986)
- Mike Bianco (born 1967), head coach of the Ole Miss Rebels baseball team
- Tommy Bianco (born 1952)
- Cavan Biggio (born 1995)
- Craig Biggio (born 1965)
- Dann Bilardello (born 1959)
- Alex Blandino (born 1992)
- Curt Blefary (1943–2001)
- John Boccabella (born 1941)
- Greg Bollo (born 1943)
- Julio Bonetti (1911–1952)
- Nino Bongiovanni (1911–2009)
- Gus Bono (1894–1948)
- Zeke Bonura (1908–1987)
- Rich Bordi (born 1959)
- Rick Bosetti (born 1953)
- Chris Bosio (born 1963)
- Ricky Bottalico (born 1969)
- John Bottarini (1908–1976)
- Larry Bowa (born 1945)
- Ralph Branca (1926–2016)
- Al Brancato (1919–2012)
- Ernie Broglio (1935–2019)
- Rico Brogna (born 1970)
- Joe Brovia (1922–1994)
- Nick Burdi (born 1993)
- Zack Burdi (born 1995)
- Drew Butera (born 1983)
- Sal Butera (born 1952)
- Jac Caglianone (born 2003)
- Sam Calderone (1926–2006)
- Fred Caligiuri (1918–2018)
- Hank Camelli (1914–1996)
- Dolph Camilli (1907–1997)
- Doug Camilli (born 1936)
- Lou Camilli (born 1946)
- Ken Caminiti (1963–2004)
- Tony Campana (born 1986)
- Roy Campanella (1921–1993), Baseball Hall of Fame (Italian father)
- Al Campanis (1916–1998), born on the island of Kos, presently a part of Greece, although it belonged to Italy at the time of his birth.
- George Canale (born 1965)
- Milo Candini (1917–1998)
- Tom Candiotti (born 1957)
- John Cangelosi (born 1963)
- Jay Canizaro (born 1973)
- Chris Cannizzaro (1938–2016)
- Dominic Canzone (born 1997)
- Buzz Capra (born 1947)
- Nick Capra (born 1958)
- Vinny Capra (born 1996)
- Pat Capri (1918–1989)
- Chris Capuano (born 1978)
- Giovanni Carrara (born 1968), Venezuelan Major League Baseball pitcher
- Bernie Carbo (born 1947)
- Mike Caruso (born 1977)
- Jerry Casale (1933–2019)
- Curt Casali (born 1988)
- Jack Cassini (1919–2010)
- Jim Castiglia (1918–2007)
- Pete Castiglione (1921–2010)
- John Castino (born 1954)
- Vince Castino (1917–1967)
- Ryan Castellani (born 1996)
- Robert Castellini, owner and team president of the Cincinnati Reds
- Frank Catalanotto (born 1974)
- Phil Cavarretta (1916–2010) (first Italian-American to manage a major league team–1951 Cubs)
- Art Ceccarelli (1930–2012)
- Garin Cecchini (born 1991)
- Gavin Cecchini (born 1993)
- Rick Cerone (born 1954)
- John Cerutti (1960–2004)
- Francisco Cervelli (born 1986), catcher for the Pittsburgh Pirates, born in Valencia, Venezuela in 1986, but is of Italian descent; played for the Italian baseball team in the World Baseball Classic in 2009 and 2017
- Italo Chelini (1914–1972)
- Dino Chiozza (1912–1972)
- Lou Chiozza (1910–1971)
- Harry Chiti (1932–2002)
- Larry Ciaffone (1924–1991)
- Archi Cianfrocco (born 1966)
- Joe Cicero (1910–1983)
- Cody Cillo (born 1980)
- Pete Cimino (born 1942)
- Gino Cimoli (1929–2011)
- Tony Cingrani (born 1989)
- Lou Ciola (1922–1981)
- Frank Cipriani (1941–2022)
- Jeff Cirillo (born 1969)
- Nick Ciuffo (born 1995)
- Aaron Civale (born 1995)
- Jack Clark (born 1955), Italian American mother
- Chris Codiroli (born 1958)
- Mike Colangelo (born 1976)
- Chris Colabello (born 1983)
- Rocky Colavito (born 1933)
- Chris Coletta (born 1944)
- Bob Coluccio (born 1951)
- Michael Conforto (born 1993)
- Billy Conigliaro (1947–2021)
- Tony Conigliaro (1945–1990)
- Billy Consolo (1934–2008)
- Chris Cooper (born 1978)
- Mike Costanzo (born 1983)
- Jason Conti (1975–2025)
- Jim Corsi (1961–2022)
- Jess Cortazzo (1904–1963)
- Tim Costo (born 1969)
- Tim Crabbe (born 1988)
- Creepy Crespi (1918–1990)
- Dave Criscione (born 1951)
- Tony Criscola (1915–2001)
- Frank Crosetti (1910–2002)
- Al Cuccinello (1914–2004)
- Tony Cuccinello (1907–2005)
- John D'Acquisto (born 1951)
- Pete Daglia (1907–1952)
- Mark Dalesandro (born 1968)
- Dom Dallessandro (1913–1988)
- Jamie D'Antona (born 1982)
- Doug Dascenzo (born 1964)
- Frank Dasso (1917–2009)
- Vic Davalillo (born 1939)
- Doug DeCinces (born 1950)
- Tony DeFrancesco (born 1963)
- Frank DeJiulio (born 1990)
- Bobby Del Greco (1933–2019)
- David Dellucci (born 1973)
- Nicky Delmonico (born 1992)
- Jonny DeLuca (born 1998)
- Dylan DeLucia (born 2000)
- Ben DeLuzio (born 1994)
- Joe DeMaestri (1928–2016)
- Frank Demaree (1910–1958)
- Mike DeMark (born 1983)
- Chris Denorfia (born 1980)
- Daniel Descalso (born 1986)
- Anthony DeSclafani (born 1990)
- Sam Dente (1922–2002)
- Mark DeRosa (born 1975)
- Matt DeSalvo (born 1980)
- Zach Dezenzo (born 2000)
- Mark DiFelice (born 1976)
- Mike DiFelice (born 1969)
- Joe DiGangi (1914–2009) – Yankees bullpen catcher
- Dom DiMaggio (1917–2009), baseball player
- Joe DiMaggio (1914–1999), Baseball Hall of Fame
- Vince DiMaggio (1912–1986), baseball player
- Lenny DiNardo (born 1979) pitcher for Kansas City Royals
- Nick Dini (born 1993)
- Jerry Dipoto (born 1968)
- Gary DiSarcina (born 1967)
- Benny Distefano (born 1962)
- Nathan Eovaldi (born 1990)
- Brian Esposito (born 1979)
- Sam Esposito (born 1931)
- Nick Fanti (born 1996)
- Sal Fasano (born 1971)
- Ernie Fazio (1942–2017)
- Carmen Fanzone (born 1941)
- Al Ferrara (1934-2024)
- Don Ferrarese (born 1929)
- Mike Ferraro (born 1944)
- Matt Festa (born 1993)
- Andrew Fischer (born 2004)
- Tony Fiore (born 1971)
- David Fletcher (born 1994)
- Dominic Fletcher (born 1997)
- Lew Fonseca (1899–1989)
- Nolan Fontana (born 1991)
- Carl Furillo (1922–1989), baseball player
- John Franco (born 1960), relief pitcher
- Terry Francona (born 1959), manager
- Tito Francona (1933–2018), baseball player
- Jim Fregosi (1942–2014)
- Sal Frelick (born 2000)
- Joey Gallo (born 1993)
- Mike Gallo (born 1977) pitcher in Major League Baseball who plays for Houston Astros
- Gary Gaetti (born 1958) power-hitting third baseman
- Joe Garagiola (1926–2016)
- Danny Gardella (1920–2005)
- Bob Garibaldi (1942–2023)
- Willie Garoni (1877–1914)
- Sam Gaviglio (born 1990)
- Jim Gentile (born 1934)
- Justin Germano (born 1982)
- Jason Giambi (born 1971)
- Jeremy Giambi (1974–2022)
- Tony Giarratano (born 1982)
- Johnny Giavotella (born 1987)
- Lucas Giolito (born 1994)
- Al Gionfriddo (1922–2003)
- Joe Girardi (born 1964)
- Dave Giusti (1939–2026)
- Gordon Graceffo (born 2000)
- Tony Graffanino (born 1972)
- Mickey Grasso (1920–1975)
- Marco Grifantini (born 1985)
- Guido Grilli (born 1939)
- Jason Grilli (born 1976), baseball pitcher who played for the Los Angeles Angels of Anaheim
- Larry Gura (born 1947)
- Matt Harvey (born 1989)
- Chris Iannetta (born 1983)
- Pete Incaviglia (born 1964)
- Alek Jacob (born 1998)
- Paul Konerko (born 1976)
- Mike Laga (born 1960)
- Matt LaPorta (born 1985)
- Tony La Russa (born 1944)
- Tommy Lasorda (1927–2021) He was inducted into the National Baseball Hall of Fame as a manager in 1997.
- Joe La Sorsa (born 1998)
- Tommy La Stella (born 1989)
- Tyler LaTorre (born 1983)
- Cookie Lavagetto (1912–1990)
- Tommy Layne (born 1984)
- Tony Lazzeri (1903–1946)
- Dominic Leone (born 1991)
- Justin Leone (born 1977)
- Adam Liberatore (born 1987)
- Tim Locastro (born 1992)
- Dario Lodigiani (1916–2008)
- Ernie Lombardi (1908–1977)
- Steve Lombardozzi (born 1960)
- Steve Lombardozzi Jr. (born 1988)
- Paul Lo Duca (born 1972), catcher in Major League Baseball who played for the Washington Nationals
- Nicky Lopez (born 1995)
- Michael Lorenzen (born 1992)
- Mark Loretta (born 1971)
- Torey Lovullo (born 1965), current manager of the Arizona Diamondbacks
- Frank Lucchesi (1927–2019), manager
- Joey Lucchesi (born 1993)
- Larry Lucchino (1945–2024), former team president and CEO of the Boston Red Sox
- Matt Macri (born 1982)
- Joe Maddon (born 1954)
- Drew Maggi (born 1989)
- Sal Maglie (1917–1992), born Salvatore Anthony Maglie.
- Paul Mainieri (born 1957), head coach of the LSU Tigers baseball team
- Frank Malzone (1930–2015)
- Trey Mancini (born 1992)
- Frank Mancuso (1918–2007)
- Gus Mancuso (1905–1984)
- Jeff Manto (born 1964)
- Bobby Marcano Cherubini (1951–1990), was a Venezuelan professional baseball player
- Joey Marciano (born 1995)
- Ron Marinaccio (born 1995)
- Chris Marrero (born 1988)
- Deven Marrero (born 1990)
- Jakob Marsee (born 2001)
- Billy Martin, born Alfred Manuel Martin (1928–1989), baseball player and manager
- Nick Martini (born 1990)
- John Marzano (1963–2008)
- Phil Masi (1916–1990)
- Miles Mastrobuoni (born 1995)
- Darin Mastroianni (born 1985)
- Chris Mazza (born 1989)
- Lee Mazzilli (born 1955)
- Leo Mazzone (born 1948)
- Cory Mazzoni (born 1989)
- Vin Mazzaro (born 1986), pitcher for Oakland A's
- Sam Mele (1922–2017)
- Frank Menechino (born 1971)
- Lou Merloni (born 1971)
- Lennie Merullo (1917–2015)
- Matt Merullo (born 1965)
- Devin Mesoraco (born 1988)
- Dan Miceli (born 1970), played for Tampa Bay Rays
- Nick Mileti (born 1931), owner and president of the Cleveland Indians from 1972 to 1975
- Tommy Milone (born 1987)
- Doug Mirabelli (born 1970), catcher
- Bob Molinaro (born 1950)
- John Montefusco (born 1950)
- Rich Monteleone (born 1963)
- Nick Morabito (born 2003)
- Mickey Morandini (born 1966)
- A.J. Morris (born 1986)
- Don Mossi (1929–2019)
- Chad Mottola (born 1971)
- Vince Naimoli (1937–2019), former owner of the Tampa Bay Rays
- Mike Napoli (born 1981), catcher/first baseman for the Los Angeles Angels, Texas Rangers, Boston Red Sox and Cleveland Indians
- Maud Nelson (1881–1944)
- Kyle Nicolas (born 1999)
- Justin Nicolino (born 1991)
- Steve Nicosia (born 1955)
- Trey Nielsen (born 1991)
- Jon Niese (born 1986)
- Brandon Nimmo (born 1993)
- Vinny Nittoli (born 1990)
- Aaron Nola (born 1993)
- Austin Nola (born 1989)
- Jake Odorizzi (born 1990)
- John Orsino (1938–2016)
- Adam Ottavino (born 1985)
- Andres Padovani Galarraga (born 1961), Venezuelan former MLB first baseman
- Mike Pagliarulo (born 1960)
- Matt Pagnozzi (born 1982)
- Tom Pagnozzi (born 1962)
- Andre Pallante (born 1998)
- Joe Palmisano (1902–1971), catcher for the Philadelphia Athletics
- Joe Palumbo (born 1994)
- Thomas Pannone (born 1994)
- Val Pascucci (born 1978)
- Dan Pasqua (born 1961)
- Vinnie Pasquantino (born 1997)
- Frank Pastore (1957–2012)
- Carl Pavano (born 1976)
- Felipe Paulino Del Guidice (born 1983)
- Joe Pepitone (1940–2023)
- Lou Perini (1903–1972), owner of the Boston/Milwaukee Braves from 1945 to 1961
- Sam Perlozzo (born 1951)
- Vinnie Pestano (born 1985)
- Roberto Petagine (born 1971), Venezuelan Major League Baseball first baseman
- Rico Petrocelli (born 1943)
- Andy Pettitte (born 1972), part Italian and part French
- Pretzel Pezzullo (1910–1990)
- Francesco Pizzoli (1887–1961), first Italian American professional baseball player, began playing for the Chicago White Sox in 1912
- Mike Piazza (born 1968)
- Rob Picciolo (1953–2018)
- Marino Pieretti (1920–1981), Italian born
- Joe Pignatano (1929–2022)
- Babe Pinelli (1895–1984)
- Rick Porcello (born 1988), pitcher
- Nick Pratto (born 1998)
- Nick Pugliese (born 1985)
- Nick Punto (born 1977)
- Matt Quatraro (born 1973)
- Frank Quilici (1939–2018)
- Bob Ramazzotti (1917–2000)
- Anthony Ranaudo (born 1989)
- Vic Raschi (1919–1988)
- J. T. Realmuto (born 1991)
- Bill Renna (1924–2014), infielder
- J. P. Ricciardi (born 1959), former general manager for the Toronto Blue Jays
- Dave Righetti (born 1958)
- Leo Righetti (1925–1998)
- Anthony Rizzo (born 1989)
- Johnny Rizzo (1912–1977)
- Phil Rizzuto (1917–2007), born Fiero Francis Rizzuto. Elected to National Baseball Hall of Fame in 1994.
- Brayan Rocchio (born 2001), Venezuelan Major League Baseball player
- Johnny Romano (1934–2019)
- Sal Romano (born 1993)
- Vinny Rottino (born 1980)
- Justin Ruggiano (born 1982)
- Kevin Russo (born 1984)
- Margaret Russo (1931–2006), All-American Girls Professional Baseball League player
- Marius Russo (1914–2005)
- Mark Saccomanno (born 1980)
- Thomas Saggese (born 2002)
- Jarrod Saltalamacchia (born 1985), former catcher and first baseman
- F. P. Santangelo (born 1967)
- Ron Santo (1940–2010)
- Jack Santora (born 1976)
- Calvin Schiraldi (born 1962)
- Mike Scioscia (born 1958)
- Marco Scutaro (born 1975), Venezuelan former San Francisco Giants second baseman
- Rob Segedin (born 1988)
- Antonio Senzatela (born 1995), Venezuelan pitcher of the Colorado Rockies
- Dan Serafini (born 1974)
- Al Silvera (1935–2002), major league baseball player
- Jason Simontacchi (born 1975), was pitcher for the St. Louis Cardinals
- Chance Sisco (born 1995)
- John Smoltz (born 1967)
- Paul Sorrento (born 1965)
- Ed Spiezio (born 1941)
- Scott Spiezio (born 1972)
- Max Stassi (born 1991)
- Mitchell Stumpo (born 1996)
- Brett Sullivan (born 1994)
- Brian Sweeney (born 1974)
- Nick Swisher (born 11/25/1980), Italian on mother's side
- Kyle Teel (born 2002)
- Gene Tenace (born 1946), born Fiore Gino Tenacci
- Matt Torra (born 1984)
- Frank Torre (1931–2014)
- Joe Torre (born 1940), manager of the NY Yankees
- Lou Trivino (born 1991)
- Nick Tropeano (born 1990)
- John Valente (born 1995)
- Bobby Valentine (born 1950)
- Vito Valentinetti (1928–2021)
- Dave Valle (born 1960)
- Pat Venditte (born 1985)
- Robin Ventura (born 1967)
- Frank Verdi (1926–2010)
- Ron Villone (born 1970)
- Frank Viola (born 1960)
- Anthony Volpe (born 2001)
- Greg Weissert (born 1995)
- Stephen Woods Jr. (born 1995)
- Sal Yvars (1924–2008)
- Dom Zanni (born 1932)
- Barry Zito (born 1978)
- Pete Zoccolillo (born 1977)
- Mike Zunino (born 1991)

== Basketball ==
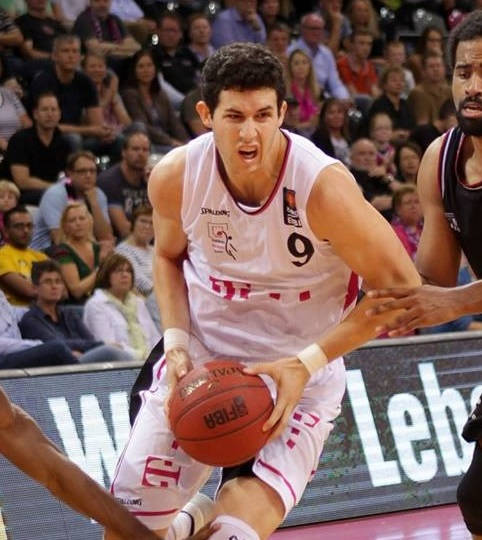
Angelo Caloiaro

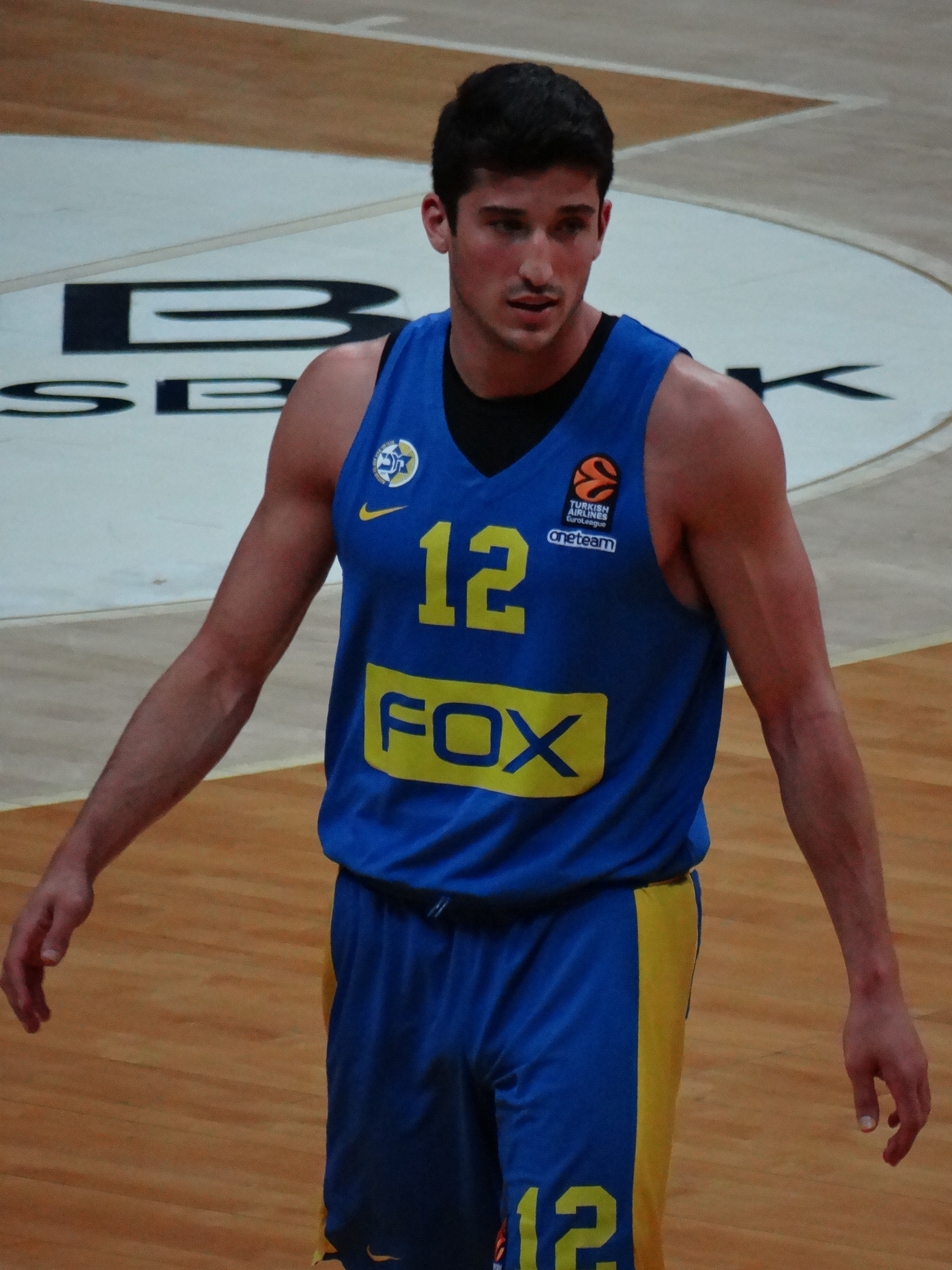
John DiBartolomeo

- Richie Adubato (born 1937)
- Corey Albano (born 1975)
- Nate Ament (born 2006), mother italian citizen, father american
- Ryan Arcidiacono (born 1994)
- Geno Auriemma (born 1954), hall of fame basketball coach
- Paul Arizin (1928–2006)
- Jennifer Azzi (born 1968)
- Paolo Banchero (born 2002)
- Matt Barnes (born 1980)
- Dick Bavetta (born 1939), NBA referee
- Al Bianchi (1932–2019)
- Danny Biasone (1909–1992)
- Joan Bonvicini (born 1953), former head coach for the Seattle University women's basketball team
- Doug Bruno (born 1950), head coach of the DePaul Blue Demons women's basketball team
- George Bucci (born 1953)
- Christian Burns (born 1985), gained Italian passport by marriage
- Dante Calabria (born 1973)
- John Calipari (born 1959) Naismith Memorial Basketball Hall of Fame Coach
- Angelo Caloiaro (born 1989), basketball player in the Israeli Basketball Premier League
- P. J. Carlesimo (born 1949)
- Lou Carnesecca (1925–2024)
- Ben Carnevale (1915–2008)
- Alex Caruso (born 1994)
- Al Cervi (1917–2009)
- Caitlin Clark (born 2002; Italian-American mother)
- Bryan Colangelo (born 1965)
- Jerry Colangelo (born 1939)
- Matt Costello (born 1993)
- Pete D'Alessandro (born 1968)
- Dan D'Antoni (born 1947)
- Mike D'Antoni (born 1951), basketball coach
- Vinny Del Negro (born 1966)
- Forrest DeBernardi (1899–1970)
- Ed DeChellis (born 1958)
- Elena Delle Donne (born 1989)
- Travis Diener (born 1982), via marriage
- John DiBartolomeo (born 1991)
- Ernie DiGregorio (born 1951)
- Tony DiLeo (born 1955)
- Mike DiNunno (born 1990)
- Donte DiVincenzo (born 1997)
- Al Ferrari (1933–2016)
- Frankie Ferrari (born 1995)
- Fran Fraschilla (born 1958)
- Mike Fratello (born 1947), basketball coach
- John Gianelli (born 1950)
- John Giannini (born 1962)
- Tom Gugliotta (born 1969)
- Daniel Hackett (born 1987)
- Mike Iuzzolino (born 1968)
- Tom Izzo (born 1955), basketball coach
- Dan Langhi (born 1977)
- Rudy LaRusso (1937–2004)
- Tony Lavelli (1926–1998)
- Kevin Lisch (born 1986)
- Hank Luisetti (1916–2002), Stanford star who developed the one handed running shot
- Anthony Maestranzi (born 1984)
- Nico Mannion (born 2001)
- Phil Martelli (born 1954), basketball coach
- Rollie Massimino (1934–2017)
- Thad Matta (born 1967)
- Kelly Mazzante (born 1982)
- Bill Melchionni, (born 1944), played 9 seasons in NBA and ABA (7 with the New York Nets)
- Nicolò Melli, (born 1991), his mother is former American volleyball Olympian Julie Vollertsen
- Franklin Mieuli, (1920–2010), owner of the Golden State Warriors from 1962–1985
- Nick Mileti, (born 1931), former owner of the Cleveland Cavaliers
- Dick Motta (born 1931)
- Angelo Musi (1918–2009)
- Mike Nardi (born 1985)
- Harry Perretta (born 1955), head coach of the women's basketball team at Villanova University
- John Petrucelli (born 1992)
- Togo Palazzi (born 1932)
- John Pinone (born 1961)
- Richard Pitino (born 1982)
- Rick Pitino (born 1952), basketball coach
- Sam Presti (born 1976), General Manager of the Oklahoma City Thunder
- Lou Pucillo (born 1936)
- Mason Rocca (born 1977)
- Jennifer Rizzotti (born 1974)
- Jerry Rullo (1922–2016)
- Kevin Salvadori (born 1970)
- Matt Santangelo (born 1977)
- Brian Scalabrine (born 1978)
- Fred Scolari (1922–2002)
- Diana Taurasi (born 1982)
- Joe Trapani (born 1988)
- Jim Valvano (1946–1993), basketball coach and sportscaster
- Jeffrey Viggiano (born 1984)
- Dick Vitale (born 1939), basketball coach and sportscaster
- Jayson Williams (born 1968), of Polish, Italian and African-American descent

== Billiards players ==
- Willie Mosconi (1913–1993), born billiards player.

== Bodybuilders ==
- Charles Atlas (1892–1972)
- Evan Centopani (born 1981)
- Bob Cicherillo (born 1965)
- Franco Columbu (1941–2019)
- Lou Ferrigno (born 1951)
- Rich Gaspari (born 1963)
- Kevin Levrone (born 1964)
- Mike Matarazzo (1965–2014)
- Dave Palumbo (born 1968)
- Frank Sepe (born 1971)
- Vince Gironda (1917-1997)
- Gregg Valentino (born 1960)

== Bowlers ==
- Buzz Fazio (1908–1993)
- Dave Ferraro (born 1959)
- Sam Maccarone (born 1975)
- Hank Marino (1889–1976)
- Amleto Monacelli (born 1961), Venezuelan bowler, member of PBA and USBC Hall of Fame
- Johnny Petraglia (born 1947)
- Carmen Salvino (born 1933)
- Andy Varipapa (1891–1974), member of USBC Hall of Fame

== Boxers ==
- Chris Algieri (born 1984), boxer
- Lou Ambers (1913–1995), born Luigi d'Ambrosio, boxer
- Sammy Angott (1915–1980), born Salvatore Engotti
- Vito Antuofermo (born 1953)
- Fred Apostoli (1913–1973)
- Carmen Basilio (1927–2012)
- Battling Battalino (1908–1977)
- Sal Bartolo (1917–2002)
- Melio Bettina (1916–1996)
- Tony Canzoneri (1908–1959), boxer
- Primo Carnera (1906–1967), heavyweight boxing champion during the 1930s and later pro-wrestling champion
- Rocky Castellani (1926–2008)
- Young Corbett III, born Raffaele Capabianca Giordano (1905–1993), world welterweight boxing champion
- Billy Costello (1956–2011)
- Cus D'Amato (1908–1985), boxing manager and trainer
- Paddy DeMarco (1928–1997)
- Tony DeMarco (born 1932)
- Angelo Dundee (1921–2012), born Angelo Merena, boxing trainer
- Joe Dundee (1903–1982), born Salvatore Lazzara, boxer
- Johnny Dundee (1893–1965), born Giuseppe Curreri, boxer
- Vince Dundee (1907–1949), born Vincenzo Lazzara, boxer
- Lou Duva (1922–2017), boxing trainer
- Charley Fusari (1924–1985)
- Rocky Fratto (born 1958)
- Arturo Gatti (1972–2009)
- Tony Galento (1910–1979)
- Frankie Genaro (1901–1966)
- Joey Giardello (1930–2008), born Carmine Orlando Tilelli, boxing star during the 1950s and 1960s
- Bushy Graham (1905–1982), born Angelo Geraci, boxer
- Rocky Graziano (1919–1990)
- Pete Herman (1896–1973), born Peter Gulotta, one of the all-time great bantamweight boxer world champions
- Harry Jeffra (1914–1988), born Ignazio Guiffo
- Rocky Kansas (1895–1954), born Rocco Tozzo, boxer
- Fidel La Barba (1905–1981)
- Jake LaMotta, (1922–2017), boxer
- Roland La Starza (1927–2009)
- Johnny Lira (1951-2012) (Italian mother)
- Vinny Maddalone (born 1973)
- Paulie Malignaggi (born 1980)
- Lenny Mancini (1919-2003)
- Ray Mancini (born 1961)
- Sammy Mandell (1904–1967), born Salvatore Mandala, world lightweight champion from 1926–1930
- Rocky Marciano (1924–1969), boxer, only heavyweight champion to retire undefeated
- Michael Marrone (born 1985), boxer
- Joey Maxim (1922–2001), born Giuseppe Antonio Berardinelli, boxer, world light heavyweight champion
- Joe Mesi (born 1973)
- Willie Pastrano (1935–1997)
- Vinny Paz (born 1962), multiple world champion, born Vinny Pazienza
- Tommy Paul (1909–1991), born Gaetano Alfonso Papa, boxer
- Willie Pep (1922–2006), born Gugliemo Papaleo
- Billy Petrolle (1905–1983)
- Paolo Rossi (1928–2004)
- Mike Rossman (born 1955) (Italian father)
- Lou Salica (1912–2002)
- Lou Savarese (born 1965)
- Petey Scalzo (1917–1993)
- Paul Spadafora (born 1975)
- Phil Terranova (1919–2000)
- Johnny Wilson (1893–1985), born Giovanni Panica, boxer

== Cyclist ==
- Robin Farina (born 1977)
- Susan DeMattei (born 1962)

== Figure skaters ==
- Brian Boitano (born 1963)
- Linda Fratianne (born 1960)
- Isabeau Levito (born 2007)

== Golfers ==
- Brittany Altomare (born 1990)
- Lou Barbaro (1916–1976)
- Dominic Bozzelli (born 1991)
- Mark Calcavecchia (born 1960)
- Donna Caponi (born 1945)
- Fred Couples (born 1959) (Father changed family name from Coppola)
- Chris DiMarco (born 1968)
- George Fazio (1912–1986)
- Ed Fiori (born 1953)
- Doug Ford (1922–2018
- Meaghan Francella (born 1982)
- Vic Ghezzi (1910–1976)
- Peter Malnati (born 1987)
- Tony Manero (1905–1989)
- Steve Marino (born 1980)
- Rocco Mediate (born 1962)
- Phil Mickelson (born 1970) member of Italian American Sports Hall of Fame. His Italian heritage comes from his mother's side of the family. His nickname at Arizona St. was "The Roman".
- Brinson Paolini (born 1991)
- Toney Penna (1908–1995)
- Johnny Revolta (1911–1991)
- Gene Sarazen (1902–1999)
- Shawn Stefani (born 1981)
- Roger Tambellini (born 1975)
- Peter Tomasulo (born 1981)
- Felice Torza (1920–1983)
- Cameron Tringale (born 1987)
- Jim Turnesa (1912–1971)
- Joe Turnesa (1905–1991)
- Marc Turnesa (born 1978)
- Mike Turnesa (1907–2000)
- Willie Turnesa (1914–2001)
- Ken Venturi (1931–2013)

== Gymnastics ==
- Mary Lou Retton (born 1968) Olympic gold medalist in gymnastics (original family name was Rotunda, changed by her grandfather)
- Alicia Sacramone (born 1987)
- Paul Ruggeri (born 1988)

== Horse racers ==
- Eddie Arcaro (1916–1997) thoroughbred horse-racing jockey. Hall of Fame jockey who won more American classic races than any other jockey in history and is the only rider to have won the U.S. Triple Crown twice.
- Frank Coltiletti (1904–1987), jockey. Hall of Fame jockey in Thoroughbred horse racing.
- Tyler Gaffalione (born 1994)
- Mike Luzzi (born 1969)
- Catello Manzi (born 1950)
- Richard Migliore (1964)
- Dave Palone (born 1962)
- Jessica Springsteen (born 1991)
- Michael Manganello (born 1941)
- Mike Venezia (1945–1988)

== Ice hockey players ==
- Noel Acciari (born 1991)
- Kenny Agostino (born 1992)
- Mark Arcobello (born 1988)
- Tony Amonte (born 1970)
- Pete Babando (1925–2020)
- Tom Barrasso (born 1965)
- Marco Baron (born 1959)
- Bates Battaglia (born 1975)
- Louis Belpedio (born 1996)
- Amo Bessone (1916–2010)
- Peter Bessone (1913–1989)
- Anthony Bitetto (born 1990)
- Nick Bonino (born 1988)
- Ryan Callahan (born 1985)
- Jack Capuano (born 1966)
- Brandon Carlo (born 1996)
- John Carlson (born 1990)
- Peter Ciavaglia (born 1969)
- Carl Corazzini (born 1979)
- Joe Corvo (born 1977)
- Rich Costello (born 1963)
- Kyle Criscuolo (born 1992)
- Jerry D'Amigo (born 1991)
- Tony DeAngelo (born 1995)
- Ron DeGregorio (born 1946)
- Clark Donatelli (born 1965)
- Ryan Donato (born 1996)
- Ted Donato (born 1969)
- Rick DiPietro (born 1981)
- Mike Eruzione (born 1954)
- Phil Esposito (born 1942)
- Tony Esposito (1943–2021)
- Adam Fantilli (born 2004)
- Chris Ferraro (born 1973)
- Peter Ferraro (born 1973)
- Marcus Foligno (born 1991)
- Nick Foligno (born 1987)
- Joe Gambardella (born 1993)
- Andre Gambucci (1928–2016)
- Brian Gionta (born 1979)
- Stephen Gionta (born 1983)
- Cammi Granato (born 1971)
- Don Granato (born 1967)
- Tony Granato (born 1964)
- Anthony Greco (born 1993)
- Rocco Grimaldi (born 1993)
- Alex Iafallo (born 1993)
- Al Iafrate (born 1966)
- Jeff Lazaro (born 1968)
- David Leggio (born 1984)
- Vinni Lettieri (born 1995)
- Chris Luongo (born 1967)
- Dean Lombardi (born 1958)
- John Mariucci (1916–1987)
- Jaycob Megna (born 1992)
- Jayson Megna (born 1990)
- Sal Messina (born 1939)
- Andy Miele (born 1988)
- Sonny Milano (born 1996)
- Mike Modano (born 1970)
- Max Pacioretty (born 1988)
- Aldo Palazzari (1918–2007)
- Doug Palazzari (born 1952)
- Michael Paliotta (born 1993)
- Kyle Palmieri (born 1991)
- Jay Pandolfo (born 1974)
- Jim Pavese (born 1962)
- Mike Peluso (ice hockey, born 1965) (born 1965)
- Mike Peluso (ice hockey, born 1974) (born 1974)
- Brett Pesce (born 1994)
- Alex Pietrangelo (born 1990)
- Tom Poti (born 1977)
- Don Rigazio (born 1934)
- Angela Ruggiero (born 1980)
- David Sacco (born 1971)
- Joe Sacco (born 1969)
- Bobby Sanguinetti (born 1988)
- Steven Santini (born 1995)
- Rob Scuderi (born 1978)
- Tim Sestito (born 1984)
- Tom Sestito (born 1987)
- Frank Simonetti (born 1962)
- Eric Tangradi (born 1989)
- Chris Terreri (born 1964)
- Dominic Toninato (born 1994)
- Matt Taormina (born 1986)
- John Torchetti (born 1964)
- John Tortorella (born 1958)
- Tony Tuzzolino (born 1975)
- John Vanbiesbrouck (born 1963)
- Frank Vatrano (born 1994)
- Rick Zombo (born 1963)

== Ice hockey owners ==
- Edward J. DeBartolo, Sr. (1909–1994), NHL owner, Pittsburgh Penguins
- Tom Golisano (born 1941), NHL owner, Buffalo Sabres
- Vincent Viola (born 1956), NHL owner, Florida Panthers

== Martial arts ==
This list is not sorted in alphabetical order or by year of birth, and actually seems to be in random order

- Gina Carano (born 1982)
- Nicholas Raymond Cerio (1936–1998)
- Michael Chiesa (born 1987)
- Matt Serra (born 1974)
- Gianpiero Villante (born 1985)
- Frankie Edgar (born 1981)
- Phil Baroni (born 1976)
- Kurt Pellegrino (born 1979)
- Al Iaquinta (born 1987)
- Donald Cerrone (born 1983)
- Urijah Faber (born 1979)
- Sam Sicilia (born 1986)
- Jessica Penne (born 1983)
- Clay Guida (born 1981)
- Rich Clementi (born 1977)
- Luigi Fioravanti (born 1981)
- Matt Mitrione (born 1978)
- Jared Gordon (born 1988)
- Seth Petruzelli (born 1979)
- Kenny Florian (born 1976)
- Sarah D'Alelio (born 1980)
- Chad Mendes (born 1985)
- Chris Camozzi (born 1986)
- Steve Bruno (born 1981)
- Paul Buentello (born 1974)
- Frank Caraballo (born 1984)
- Luke Cummo (born 1980)
- Scott Ferrozzo (born 1965)
- Josh Grispi (born 1988)
- Chris Lozano (born 1982)
- Mike Massenzio (born 1982)
- Steve Mocco (born 1981)
- Danny Sabatello (born 1993)
- Eric Schambari (born 1978)
- Sean Soriano (born 1989)
- Roxanne Modafferi (born 1982)
- Rich Attonito (born 1977)
- Nick Catone (born 1981)
- Jason Guida (born 1977)
- Brandon Vera (born 1977)
- Frank Trigg (born 1972)
- Lando Vannata (born 1992)
- Tara LaRosa (born 1978)
- Rafael Lovato Jr. (born 1983)
- Matt Frevola (born 1990)

== Motorcycle racers ==
- Randy Mamola (born 1959)
- Joe Petrali (1904–1973)

== Race car drivers ==
- Marco Andretti (born 1987), son of Michael Andretti, IRL IndyCar Rookie of the Year
- Mario Andretti (born 1940), race car driver
- Michael Andretti (born 1962), 1991 IndyCar champion, son of Mario
- John Andretti (1963–2020), NASCAR driver, nephew of Mario
- Richard Antinucci (born 1981)
- Eddie Cheever (born 1958)
- Luigi Chinetti (1901–1994), drove in 12 consecutive 24 Hours of Le Mans races, taking three outright wins. Migrated to the United States were owned the North American Racing Team. For many years he was the exclusive American importer of Ferrari automobiles
- Sergio Cresto (1956–1986), a WRC co-driver killed in the 1986 Tour de Corse with Henri Toivonen when their Lancia Delta S4 crashed down a ravine and exploded into flames.
- Ralph DePalma (1884–1956), race car driver
- Milka Duno (born 1972)
- Santino Ferrucci (born 1998)
- Chip Ganassi (born 1958)
- Joey Logano (born 1990)
- Al Loquasto (1940–1991), IndyCar driver, killed in a plane crash
- Danica Patrick (born 1982), the most successful woman in the history of American open-wheel car racing, her victory in the 2008 Indy Japan 300 is the only win by a woman in an IndyCar Series race.
- Tom Pistone (born 1929)
- Enzo Potolicchio (born 1968)
- Alexander Rossi (born 1991)
- Paul Russo (1914–1976)
- Nino Vaccarella (1933–2021)
- Bill Venturini (born 1953)

== Rowing ==
- Peter Cipollone (born 1971)
- Erin Cafaro (born 1983)
- Steven Coppola (born 1984)
- Gordy Giovanelli (1925–2022)
- Tessa Gobbo (born 1990)
- Adrienne Martelli (born 1987)

== Skiing/Snowboarding ==
- Julia Mancuso (born 1984), alpine skier; won a gold medal in the Giant Slalom race at the 2006 Winter Olympics in Turin.
- Shaun White (born 1986), professional snowboarder and three time Olympic gold medalist from the 2006, 2010 and 2018 Olympics

== Soccer ==
- Tyler Adams (born 1999), plays as a midfielder for United States men's national soccer team, of Italian descent through his mother.
- Chris Aloisi (born 1981), a defender who, from 2004–07, had stints in Major League Soccer with the Los Angeles Galaxy, San Jose Earthquakes and Houston Dynamo and in the USL First Division with the Rochester Rhinos. Since 2008, Aloisi has been playing for the Long Island Rough Riders of the Premier Development League.
- Bruce Arena (born 1951), former head football coach for the United States men's national soccer team.
- Carmelo D'Anzi (born 1956), played professional soccer in Italy, Mexico and U.S.A.; won 7 championships and 5 leading scoring titles during his career.
- Vincenzo Bernardo (born 1990), played for the New York Red Bulls U-17 and U-19 teams from 2004-06. In 2006, he joined Italian team Napoli, but would play only on its primavera squad. As of 2009, after declining a 2-year contract extension from Napoli, which would have seen him play, on loan, for a team in the Lega Pro Seconda Divisione, he is a free agent.
- Frank Borghi (1925–2015), played for the U.S. national team in the 1950 World Cup.
- Gianluca Busio (born 2002), Of Italian descent through his Brescia-born father and holds Italian and American citizenship. Currently plays as a midfielder for Serie A club Venezia FC and the United States national team.
- Claudia Cagnina (born 1997)
- Paul Caligiuri (born 1964), played for the U.S. national team in the 1994 World Cup.
- Mike Catalano (born 1995)
- Dominic Cervi (born 1986)
- Mauro Cichero, footballer
- Charlie Colombo (1920–1986), played for the U.S. national team in the 1950 World Cup.
- Robert Contiguglia (born 1941), former President of the United States Soccer Federation.
- Tony Donatelli (born 1984), born in Glenside, Pennsylvania
- Aldo Donelli (1907–1994), played both American football and soccer, and is a member of the National Soccer Hall of Fame. He scored all 4 goals for the United States in their qualifying game victory against Mexico for the 1934 FIFA World Cup becoming the first American to score his first three international goals with the senior team in the same match. Three days later, he would also score the USA's lone goal in their first-round elimination game against Italy; this would be the final time an American tallied a goal on Italian soil for 58 years.
- Mike Grella (born 1987), striker who played the majority of his career in England, now playing for New York Red Bulls. His family is original from Sturno, in the province of Avellino.
- Gabriel Ferrari (born 1988), striker prospect for Italian club, Sampdoria. Has stated intention to play on American national teams.
- Tom Florie (1897–1966), played in both the first and second American Soccer Leagues, winning two National Challenge Cup titles, and was also a member of the United States men's national soccer team at the 1930 and 1934 FIFA World Cup. He was inducted into the U.S. National Soccer Hall of Fame in 1986.
- Joe Franchino (born 1976), a defensive midfielder in Major League Soccer who has played for the Los Angeles Galaxy and New England Revolution. He has also appeared in one game for US national team in a friendly against Mexico in October 2000.
- Armando Frigo (1917–1943), American-born player in Serie A.
- Patrick Ianni (born 1985) soccer defensive midfielder, plays for Seattle Sounders FC of Major League Soccer
- Tayt Ianni (born 1971), played from 1993–2000, primarily in minor and developmental leagues across the United States. His only professional stint was for the San Jose Clash of Major League Soccer from 1996-97. His only cap for the U.S. national team occurred on October 19, 1996 in a 4-1 loss to Peru. Tayt is the brother of Patrick Ianni.
- Pablo Mastroeni (born 1976), born in Argentina of Italian descent.
- Joe Martinelli (1916–1991), spent thirteen seasons in the American Soccer League and earned three caps with the U.S. national team, all against Mexico in September 1937. While selected to the US squad for the 1934 FIFA World Cup, he did not appear in the lone game the US played.
- Domenic Mediate (born 1982)
- Tony Meola (born 1969), starting goalkeeper for the U.S. national team during the 1990 and 1994 World Cups.
- Daniel Paladini (born 1984), was selected 24th over all in the 2006 MLS Supplemental Draft by the Los Angeles Galaxy, though he only played for the team's reserve squad. Paladini currently plays for the Carolina RailHawks in the USSF D2 Pro League.
- Gino Pariani (1928–2007), played for the U.S. national team in the 1950 World Cup.
- Christian Pulisic (born 1998), plays as a winger for United States men's national soccer team, of Sicilian descent through his paternal grandmother.
- Christie Rampone (born 1975), former captain of the United States women's national soccer team. She is a 3-time Olympic gold medalist, and also a 2-time FIFA Women's World Cup champion.
- Giuseppe Rossi (born 1987), born in the United States to Italian immigrant parents, he also holds citizenship from Italy and plays for Italian national teams.
- Giovanni Savarese (born 1971), Venezuelan-American head coach of the newly formed New York Cosmos soccer club and Portland Timbers.
- Hope Solo (born 1981)
- Sal Zizzo (born 1987), Hannover 96 winger playing for American national teams.

== Softball ==
- Christie Ambrosi (born 1976)
- Erika Piancastelli (born 1996)
- Michelle Venturella (born 1973)

== Swimmers ==
- Matt Biondi (born 1965), Olympic swimmer.
- Wendy Boglioli (born 1955)
- Lynn Colella (born 1950)
- Rick Colella (born 1951)
- Peter J. Cutino (1933–2004), California swimming and water polo coach
- Mary DeScenza (born 1984)
- George DiCarlo (born 1963)
- Maya DiRado (born 1993)
- Eleanor Garatti (1909–1998)
- Blake Pieroni (born 1995)
- Peter Rocca (born 1957)
- Megan Romano (born 1991)
- Sheila Taormina (born 1969)
- Luca Urlando (born 2002)

== Tennis players ==
- Paul Annacone (born 1963)
- Nick Bollettieri (born 1931)
- Jennifer Capriati (born 1976), professional tennis player
- Mary Carillo (born 1957)
- Pam Casale (born 1963)
- Bjorn Fratangelo (born 1993)
- Christina Fusano (born 1980)
- Sammy Giammalva (born 1963)
- Francesca Di Lorenzo (born 1997)
- Kathy Rinaldi (born 1967)
- Derrick Rostagno (born 1965)
- Nick Saviano (born 1956)
- Robert Seguso (born 1963)
- Luanne Spadea (born 1972)
- Vince Spadea (born 1974)
- Eliot Spizzirri (born 2001)
- Jeff Tarango (born 1968)

== Volleyball ==
- Lauren Carlini (born 1995)

== See also ==
- List of Italian Americans
