= 1935 Pittsburgh Pirates season =

1935 Pittsburgh Pirates
- League: National League
- Ballpark: Forbes Field
- City: Pittsburgh, Pennsylvania
- Owners: Bill Benswanger
- Managers: Pie Traynor
- Radio: KQV; Pat Patterson; WWSW; Walt Sickles

The 1935 Pittsburgh Pirates season was a season in American baseball which involved the Pirates finishing fourth in the National League.

The roster featured five future Hall of Famers: player-manager Pie Traynor, pitcher Waite Hoyt, shortstop Arky Vaughan, center fielder Lloyd Waner, and right fielder Paul Waner.

== Offseason ==
- December 12, 1934: Leon Chagnon was traded by the Pirates to the New York Giants for Jack Salveson.

== Regular season ==
Vaughan hit .385 on his way to being named the NL's Most Valuable Player by The Sporting News. It is considered the best offensive season ever by a shortstop other than Honus Wagner.

On May 25, 1935, Babe Ruth of the Boston Braves hit the final three home runs of his career in one game against the Pirates at Forbes Field.

=== Season standings ===
National League
Team	W	L	Pct.	GB	Home	Road
Chicago Cubs	100	54	.649	—	56‍–‍21	44‍–‍33
St. Louis Cardinals	96	58	.623	4	53‍–‍24	43‍–‍34
New York Giants	91	62	.595	8½	50‍–‍27	41‍–‍35
Pittsburgh Pirates	86	67	.562	13½	46‍–‍31	40‍–‍36
Brooklyn Dodgers	70	83	.458	29½	38‍–‍38	32‍–‍45
Cincinnati Reds	68	85	.444	31½	41‍–‍35	27‍–‍50
Philadelphia Phillies	64	89	.418	35½	35‍–‍43	29‍–‍46
Boston Braves	38	115	.248	61½	25‍–‍50	13‍–‍65

=== Record vs. opponents ===
1935 National League record Sources:
Team	BSN	BRO	CHC	CIN	NYG	PHI	PIT	STL
Boston	—	6–16	3–19	10–12	5–16	8–14	2–20	4–18
Brooklyn	16–6	—	5–17	11–11	9–13	12–9–1	11–11	6–16
Chicago	19–3	17–5	—	14–8	14–8	13–9	15–7	8–14
Cincinnati	12–10	11–11	8–14	—	8–14–1	13–9	8–13	8–14
New York	16–5	13–9	8–14	14–8–1	—	12–10–2	14–8	14–8
Philadelphia	14–8	9–12–1	9–13	9–13	10–12–2	—	6–16	7–15
Pittsburgh	20–2	11–11	7–15	13–8	8–14	16–6	—	11–11
St. Louis	18–4	16–6	14–8	14–8	8–14	15–7	11–11	—

=== Game log ===
1935 Game Log: 86–67 (Home: 46–31; Away: 40–36)
April: 6–8 (Home: 1–4; Away: 5–4)

#	Date	Opponent	Score	Win	Loss	Save	Attendance	Record
1	April 16	@ Reds	12–6	**Hoyt** (1–0)	Freitas	—	27,400	1–0
2	April 17	Reds	4–7	Derringer	**Bush** (0–1)	—	—	1–1
3	April 18	Reds	4–9	Frey	**Weaver** (0–1)	—	1,560	1–2
4	April 19	Cardinals	3–0	**Blanton** (1–0)	Hallahan	—	—	2–2
5	April 20	Cardinals	1–4	Walker	**Hoyt** (1–1)	—	—	2–3
6	April 21	Cardinals	1–6	Dean	**Bush** (0–2)	—	28,000	2–4
7	April 23	@ Reds	4–3	**Weaver** (1–1)	Freitas	**Swift** (1)	8,836	3–4
8	April 24	@ Reds	5–2	**Blanton** (2–0)	Hollingsworth	—	4,036	4–4
9	April 25	@ Reds	0–6	Frey	**Hoyt** (1–2)	—	2,590	4–5
10	April 26	@ Cardinals	2–3 (11)	Heusser	**Swift** (0–1)	—	—	4–6
11	April 27	@ Cardinals	8–5	**Weaver** (2–1)	Hallahan	—	10,000	5–6
12	April 28	@ Cardinals	3–2	**Blanton** (3–0)	Dean	—	12,000	6–6
13	April 29	@ Cubs	11–12	Kowalik	**Salveson** (0–1)	Bryant	—	6–7
14	April 30	@ Cubs	0–3	Henshaw	**Birkofer** (0–1)	—	—	6–8

May: 17–11 (Home: 9–6; Away: 8–5)

#	Date	Opponent	Score	Win	Loss	Save	Attendance	Record
15	May 3	@ Dodgers	1–2	Mungo	**Weaver** (2–2)	—	—	6–9
16	May 4	@ Dodgers	1–0	**Blanton** (4–0)	Zachary	—	—	7–9
17	May 5	@ Dodgers	9–2	**Bush** (1–2)	Clark	—	13,000	8–9
18	May 6	@ Braves	8–6	**Hoyt** (2–2)	Benton	**Blanton** (1)	—	9–9
19	May 8	@ Braves	3–12	Frankhouse	**Weaver** (2–3)	—	—	9–10
20	May 9	@ Giants	1–3	Hubbell	**Blanton** (4–1)	—	6,000	9–11
21	May 11	@ Giants	4–1	**Bush** (2–2)	Schumacher	—	—	10–11
22	May 11	@ Giants	0–3	Fitzsimmons	**Hoyt** (2–3)	—	40,000	10–12
23	May 12	@ Giants	1–3	Parmelee	**Weaver** (2–4)	—	20,000	10–13
24	May 13	@ Phillies	10–1	**Blanton** (5–1)	Bivin	—	—	11–13
25	May 14	@ Phillies	8–1	**Birkofer** (1–1)	Walters	—	1,500	12–13
26	May 15	@ Phillies	20–5	**Swift** (1–1)	Jorgens	—	—	13–13
27	May 16	Dodgers	0–2 (13)	Zachary	**Hoyt** (2–4)	—	6,000	13–14
28	May 17	Dodgers	1–7	Benge	**Weaver** (2–5)	—	—	13–15
29	May 18	Dodgers	8–2	**Blanton** (6–1)	Mungo	—	8,000	14–15
30	May 19	Dodgers	9–6	**Swift** (2–1)	Eisenstat	**Hoyt** (1)	10,000	15–15
31	May 20	Giants	11–4	**Lucas** (1–0)	Hubbell	—	—	16–15
32	May 21	Giants	4–9	Castleman	**Hoyt** (2–5)	Smith	—	16–16
33	May 22	Giants	2–5	Parmelee	**Blanton** (6–2)	—	6,000	16–17
34	May 23	Braves	7–1	**Swift** (3–1)	Cantwell	—	10,000	17–17
35	May 24	Braves	7–6	**Weaver** (3–5)	Brandt	—	—	18–17
36	May 25	Braves	11–7	**Hoyt** (3–5)	Cantwell	—	—	19–17
37	May 26	Phillies	3–1	**Blanton** (7–2)	Prim	—	10,000	20–17
38	May 27	Phillies	2–4	Pezzullo	**Swift** (3–2)	Moore	—	20–18
39	May 28	Phillies	3–1	**Weaver** (4–5)	Pezzullo	—	—	21–18
40	May 30	Cubs	4–6	Henshaw	**Blanton** (7–3)	—	40,430	21–19
41	May 30	Cubs	4–1	**Lucas** (2–0)	French	—	40,430	22–19
42	May 31	@ Reds	4–1	**Swift** (4–2)	Hollingsworth	—	19,429	23–19

June: 16–11 (Home: 5–1; Away: 11–10)

#	Date	Opponent	Score	Win	Loss	Save	Attendance	Record
43	June 2	@ Reds	8–0	**Weaver** (5–5)	Derringer	—	2,973	24–19
44	June 4	Cardinals	9–5	**Blanton** (8–3)	Dean	—	4,000	25–19
45	June 6	Cardinals	2–1	**Bush** (3–2)	Haines	—	—	26–19
46	June 7	Reds	4–13 (7)	Derringer	**Weaver** (5–6)	—	1,110	26–20
47	June 8	Reds	14–8	**Hoyt** (4–5)	Brennan	**Bush** (1)	5,800	27–20
48	June 9	Reds	7–4	**Blanton** (9–3)	Johnson	—	5,046	28–20
49	June 10	Reds	14–1	**Swift** (5–2)	Hollingsworth	—	1,186	29–20
50	June 11	@ Dodgers	4–0	**Bush** (4–2)	Zachary	—	3,000	30–20
51	June 12	@ Dodgers	7–3	**Birkofer** (2–1)	Leonard	—	—	31–20
52	June 13	@ Dodgers	0–3	Mungo	**Blanton** (9–4)	—	—	31–21
53	June 14	@ Dodgers	1–0	**Swift** (6–2)	Clark	—	—	32–21
54	June 15	@ Phillies	5–6	Johnson	**Blanton** (9–5)	—	—	32–22
55	June 16	@ Phillies	4–12	Pezzullo	**Birkofer** (2–2)	—	—	32–23
56	June 17	@ Phillies	12–5	**Swift** (7–2)	Walters	—	—	33–23
57	June 20	@ Giants	2–6	Smith	**Bush** (4–3)	—	—	33–24
58	June 21	@ Giants	4–11	Castleman	**Lucas** (2–1)	—	—	33–25
59	June 22	@ Giants	5–4 (11)	**Hoyt** (5–5)	Smith	—	—	34–25
60	June 22	@ Giants	3–7	Schumacher	**Weaver** (5–7)	—	10,000	34–26
61	June 23	@ Braves	4–3	**Weaver** (6–7)	MacFayden	—	—	35–26
62	June 23	@ Braves	7–4	**Bush** (5–3)	Smith	—	—	36–26
63	June 25	@ Braves	2–7	MacFayden	**Birkofer** (2–3)	—	—	36–27
64	June 26	@ Braves	4–2	**Bush** (6–3)	Cantwell	—	—	37–27
65	June 26	@ Braves	5–1	**Swift** (8–2)	Betts	—	—	38–27
66	June 28	@ Cubs	0–8	Henshaw	**Weaver** (6–8)	—	—	38–28
67	June 29	@ Cubs	0–1 (12)	French	**Hoyt** (5–6)	—	—	38–29
68	June 29	@ Cubs	1–2	Warneke	**Lucas** (2–2)	—	17,400	38–30
69	June 30	@ Cubs	9–7	**Blanton** (10–5)	Root	—	10,400	39–30

July: 15–14 (Home: 14–12; Away: 1–2)

#	Date	Opponent	Score	Win	Loss	Save	Attendance	Record
70	July 2	@ Cardinals	0–7	Hallahan	**Bush** (6–4)	—	—	39–31
71	July 4	@ Reds	9–5	**Hoyt** (6–6)	Frey	—	—	40–31
72	July 4	@ Reds	4–5	Brennan	**Blanton** (10–6)	Freitas	13,000	40–32
73	July 5	Cubs	4–0	**Lucas** (3–2)	Henshaw	—	10,000	41–32
74	July 6	Cubs	8–10 (13)	Warneke	**Swift** (8–3)	—	—	41–33
75	July 7	Cubs	1–13	Lee	**Blanton** (10–7)	—	—	41–34
76	July 10	Giants	3–10	Schumacher	**Hoyt** (6–7)	—	—	41–35
77	July 11	Giants	2–4	Parmelee	**Lucas** (3–3)	—	—	41–36
78	July 13	Giants	6–7	Hubbell	**Hoyt** (6–8)	—	—	41–37
79	July 14	Giants	4–2	**Blanton** (11–7)	Smith	—	12,000	42–37
80	July 16	Dodgers	3–9	Zachary	**Swift** (8–4)	—	2,000	42–38
81	July 17	Dodgers	4–5	Clark	**Bush** (6–5)	Leonard	—	42–39
82	July 17	Dodgers	0–5	Earnshaw	**Hoyt** (6–9)	—	—	42–40
83	July 18	Dodgers	3–5	Benge	**Blanton** (11–8)	Leonard	—	42–41
84	July 19	Braves	6–5	**Bush** (7–5)	Cantwell	—	—	43–41
85	July 20	Braves	14–2	**Brown** (1–0)	Frankhouse	—	—	44–41
86	July 20	Braves	6–3	**Weaver** (7–8)	MacFayden	—	—	45–41
87	July 21	Braves	7–0	**Swift** (9–4)	Brandt	—	—	46–41
88	July 22	Phillies	5–4	**Bush** (8–5)	Pezzullo	—	—	47–41
89	July 24	Phillies	8–6	**Birkofer** (3–3)	Prim	**Bush** (2)	—	48–41
90	July 24	Phillies	4–3	**Brown** (2–0)	Johnson	**Hoyt** (2)	—	49–41
91	July 25	Phillies	9–8	**Bush** (9–5)	Davis	—	—	50–41
92	July 27	Cardinals	10–4	**Blanton** (12–8)	Collins	—	—	51–41
93	July 28	Cardinals	3–4	Dean	**Bush** (9–6)	—	36,000	51–42
94	July 28	Cardinals	5–4	**Swift** (10–4)	Walker	—	36,000	52–42
95	July 29	Cardinals	3–2	**Lucas** (4–3)	Hallahan	—	—	53–42
96	July 30	Cubs	6–9	Lee	**Brown** (2–1)	—	—	53–43
97	July 31	Cubs	2–4	Henshaw	**Blanton** (12–9)	French	—	53–44
98	July 31	Cubs	6–5 (11)	**Birkofer** (4–3)	Root	—	—	54–44

August: 20–11 (Home: 7–2; Away: 13–9)

#	Date	Opponent	Score	Win	Loss	Save	Attendance	Record
99	August 1	Cubs	6–5	**Swift** (11–4)	Warneke	**Hoyt** (3)	—	55–44
100	August 3	@ Cardinals	0–6	Walker	**Lucas** (4–4)	—	—	55–45
101	August 4	@ Cardinals	3–4 (10)	Dean	**Hoyt** (6–10)	—	17,000	55–46
102	August 4	@ Cardinals	5–6	Walker	**Swift** (11–5)	—	17,000	55–47
103	August 6	@ Cubs	1–2	Henshaw	**Birkofer** (4–4)	—	16,000	55–48
104	August 7	@ Cubs	6–0	**Blanton** (13–9)	French	—	—	56–48
105	August 8	@ Cubs	5–9	Carleton	**Bush** (9–7)	—	—	56–49
106	August 9	Reds	1–0	**Swift** (12–5)	Hollingsworth	—	—	57–49
107	August 10	Reds	0–2	Derringer	**Birkofer** (4–5)	—	—	57–50
108	August 11	Reds	5–4	**Blanton** (14–9)	Freitas	—	—	58–50
109	August 11	Reds	3–4	Schott	**Bush** (9–8)	Derringer	—	58–51
110	August 12	Reds	7–4	**Lucas** (5–4)	Hollingsworth	**Birkofer** (1)	—	59–51
111	August 14	@ Phillies	8–1	**Swift** (13–5)	Davis	—	—	60–51
112	August 14	@ Phillies	7–4	**Weaver** (8–8)	Pezzullo	—	—	61–51
113	August 15	@ Phillies	1–9	Bowman	**Bush** (9–9)	—	—	61–52
114	August 17	@ Phillies	2–0	**Lucas** (6–4)	Jorgens	—	—	62–52
115	August 17	@ Phillies	5–1	**Birkofer** (5–5)	Walters	—	—	63–52
116	August 18	@ Dodgers	0–3	Clark	**Swift** (13–6)	—	—	63–53
117	August 18	@ Dodgers	3–9	Benge	**Bush** (9–10)	Reis	—	63–54
118	August 20	@ Dodgers	2–0	**Weaver** (9–8)	Zachary	—	—	64–54
119	August 21	@ Dodgers	0–5	Earnshaw	**Birkofer** (5–6)	—	—	64–55
120	August 23	@ Braves	7–5	**Swift** (14–6)	Cantwell	**Hoyt** (4)	—	65–55
121	August 24	@ Braves	3–2	**Blanton** (15–9)	Frankhouse	—	2,000	66–55
122	August 25	@ Braves	9–2	**Weaver** (10–8)	Smith	—	—	67–55
123	August 25	@ Braves	6–5 (11)	**Lucas** (7–4)	Betts	—	—	68–55
124	August 26	@ Giants	10–2	**Birkofer** (6–6)	Smith	—	—	69–55
125	August 28	@ Giants	6–1	**Blanton** (16–9)	Hubbell	—	—	70–55
126	August 28	@ Giants	9–5	**Swift** (15–6)	Parmelee	—	15,000	71–55
127	August 29	Cardinals	5–1	**Weaver** (11–8)	Dean	—	7,000	72–55
128	August 30	Cardinals	9–3	**Lucas** (8–4)	Hallahan	—	—	73–55
129	August 31	Cubs	5–0	**Birkofer** (7–6)	French	—	—	74–55

September: 12–12 (Home: 10–6; Away: 2–6)

#	Date	Opponent	Score	Win	Loss	Save	Attendance	Record
130	September 1	Cubs	2–8	Henshaw	**Blanton** (16–10)	—	—	74–56
131	September 2	@ Cardinals	3–4 (16)	Dean	**Hoyt** (6–11)	—	31,000	74–57
132	September 2	@ Cardinals	1–4 (5)	Dean	**Swift** (15–7)	—	31,000	74–58
133	September 5	Dodgers	5–4	**Birkofer** (8–6)	Leonard	**Hoyt** (5)	1,000	75–58
134	September 6	Dodgers	13–0	**Blanton** (17–10)	Zachary	—	—	76–58
135	September 7	Dodgers	5–4	**Bush** (10–10)	Benge	—	—	77–58
136	September 8	Giants	1–3	Hubbell	**Lucas** (8–5)	—	18,000	77–59
137	September 10	Giants	3–4	Castleman	**Blanton** (17–11)	Stout	—	77–60
138	September 10	Giants	2–4	Smith	**Birkofer** (8–7)	—	4,000	77–61
139	September 11	Giants	10–7	**Bush** (11–10)	Parmelee	—	—	78–61
140	September 12	Phillies	11–0	**Weaver** (12–8)	Pezzullo	—	—	79–61
141	September 13	Phillies	1–5	Davis	**Swift** (15–8)	—	—	79–62
142	September 14	Phillies	5–7	Prim	**Blanton** (17–12)	—	—	79–63
143	September 15	Phillies	5–3	**Birkofer** (9–7)	Jorgens	—	—	80–63
144	September 16	Braves	5–3	**Brown** (3–1)	Brown	—	—	81–63
145	September 17	Braves	6–4	**Weaver** (13–8)	Brandt	**Hoyt** (6)	—	82–63
146	September 18	Braves	5–2	**Blanton** (18–12)	Frankhouse	—	—	83–63
147	September 19	Braves	7–6	**Hoyt** (7–11)	Cantwell	—	—	84–63
148	September 21	@ Cubs	3–4	Henshaw	**Bush** (11–11)	Warneke	39,000	84–64
149	September 22	@ Cubs	0–2	French	**Blanton** (18–13)	—	40,558	84–65
150	September 23	@ Cardinals	12–0	**Weaver** (14–8)	Heusser	—	7,500	85–65
151	September 24	@ Cardinals	2–11	Hallahan	**Lucas** (8–6)	—	—	85–66
152	September 29	@ Reds	5–1	**Brown** (4–1)	Hollingsworth	—	—	86–66
153	September 29	@ Reds	6–9	Derringer	**Passeau** (0–1)	—	8,021	86–67

Legend: = Win = Loss
Bold = Pirates team member

=== Roster ===
1935 Pittsburgh Pirates
**Roster**
**Pitchers**: 49 Ralph Birkofer; 46 Cy Blanton; 50 Mace Brown; 41 Guy Bush; 48 Waite Hoyt; 40 Red Lucas; 52 Wayne Osborne; -- Claude Passeau; 44 Jack Salveson; 47 Hal Smith; 45 Bill Swift; 43 Jim Weaver	**Catchers**: 37 Aubrey Epps; 30 Earl Grace; 31 Tom Padden; **Infielders**: -- Earl Browne; 27 Bill Brubaker; 22 Cookie Lavagetto; 24 Gus Suhr; 25 Tommy Thevenow; 20 Pie Traynor; 21 Arky Vaughan; 26 Pep Young	**Outfielders**: 47 Bud Hafey; 14 Babe Herman; 16 Woody Jensen; 10 Lloyd Waner; 11 Paul Waner; **Other batters**: 15 Steve Swetonic	**Manager**: 20 Pie Traynor; **Coaches**: 33 Jewel Ens; 36 Honus Wagner

== Player stats ==
=== Batting ===
==== Starters by position ====
Note: Pos = Position; G = Games played; AB = At bats; H = Hits; Avg. = Batting average; HR = Home runs; RBI = Runs batted in

Pos	Player	G	AB	H	Avg.	HR	RBI
C	Tom Padden	97	302	82	.272	1	30
1B	Gus Suhr	153	529	144	.272	10	81
2B	Pep Young	128	494	131	.265	7	82
3B	Tommy Thevenow	110	408	97	.238	0	47
SS	Arky Vaughan	137	499	192	.385	19	99
LF	Woody Jensen	143	627	203	.324	8	62
CF	Lloyd Waner	122	537	166	.309	0	46
RF	Paul Waner	139	549	176	.321	11	78

==== Other batters ====
Note: G = Games played; AB = At bats; H = Hits; Avg. = Batting average; HR = Home runs; RBI = Runs batted in

Player	G	AB	H	Avg.	HR	RBI
Cookie Lavagetto	78	231	67	.290	0	19
Earl Grace	77	224	59	.263	3	29
Pie Traynor	57	204	57	.279	1	36
Bud Hafey	58	184	42	.228	6	16
Babe Herman	26	81	19	.235	0	7
Earl Browne	9	32	8	.250	0	6
Bill Brubaker	6	11	0	.000	0	0
Aubrey Epps	1	4	3	.750	0	3
Steve Swetonic	1	0	0	----	0	0

=== Pitching ===
==== Starting pitchers ====
Note: G = Games pitched; IP = Innings pitched; W = Wins; L = Losses; ERA = Earned run average; SO = Strikeouts

Player	G	IP	W	L	ERA	SO
Cy Blanton	35	254.1	18	13	2.58	142
Jim Weaver	33	176.1	14	8	3.42	87
Red Lucas	20	125.2	8	6	3.44	29
Claude Passeau	1	3.0	0	1	12.00	1

==== Other pitchers ====
Note: G = Games pitched; IP = Innings pitched; W = Wins; L = Losses; ERA = Earned run average; SO = Strikeouts

Player	G	IP	W	L	ERA	SO
Guy Bush	41	204.1	11	11	4.32	42
Bill Swift	39	203.2	15	8	.270	74
Waite Hoyt	39	164.0	7	11	3.40	63
Ralph Birkofer	37	150.1	9	7	4.07	80
Mace Brown	18	72.2	4	1	3.59	28

==== Relief pitchers ====
Note: G = Games pitched; W = Wins; L = Losses; SV = Saves; ERA = Earned run average; SO = Strikeouts

Player	G	W	L	SV	ERA	SO
Jack Salveson	5	0	1	0	9.00	2
Wayne Osborne	2	0	0	0	6.75	1
Hal Smith	1	0	0	0	3.00	0

== Awards and honors ==
- Arky Vaughan, The Sporting News NL MVP

1935 Major League Baseball All-Star Game

- Arky Vaughan, SS, starter
- Paul Waner, reserve

=== League top five finishers ===
Cy Blanton

- MLB leader in ERA (2.58)

Bill Swift

- #2 in NL in ERA (2.70)

Arky Vaughan

- MLB leader in batting average (.385)
- MLB leader in on-base percentage (.491)
- NL leader in slugging percentage (.607)

== Farm system ==
Level	Team	League	Manager
AA	Kansas City Blues	American Association	Dutch Zwilling
A	Birmingham Barons	Southern Association	Clyde Milan and Bill Pierre
C	Portsmouth Pirates	Middle Atlantic League	Jake Pitler
