= Chiozza (surname) =

Chiozza (pronounced [ˈkjoddza]) is an Italian surname from Venice and Genoa, derived from an archaic name for the town of Chioggia, Venice. Notable people with this surname include:

- Chris Chiozza (born 1995), American basketball player
- Dino Chiozza (1912–1972), American baseball player
- Elena Chiozza (1919–2011), Argentine geographer
- Leo Chiozza Money (1870–1944), Italian-British economic theorist
- Lou Chiozza (1910–1971), American baseball player

== See also ==
- Chiozza (disambiguation)
- Chiozzo (surname)
- Chiozzi
