= 1935 Chicago Cubs season =

1935 Chicago Cubs
- National League champions
- League: National League
- Ballpark: Wrigley Field
- City: Chicago
- Record: 100–54 (.649)
- League place: 1st
- Owners: Philip K. Wrigley
- General managers: Charles Weber
- Managers: Charlie Grimm
- Radio: WGN (Bob Elson); WBBM (Pat Flanagan); WMAQ (Hal Totten); WIND (Russ Hodges)

The 1935 Chicago Cubs season was the 64th season for the Chicago Cubs franchise, the 60th in the National League and the 20th at Wrigley Field. The season saw the Cubs finish with 100 wins for the first time in 25 years; they would not win 100 games in another season until 2016. The Cubs won their 14th National League pennant in team history and faced the Detroit Tigers in the World Series, but lost in six games.

The 1935 season is largely remembered for the Cubs' 21-game winning streak. The streak began on September 4 with the Cubs 2.5 games out of first place. They would not lose again until September 28. The streak propelled the Cubs to the National League pennant. The 21-game winning streak tied the franchise and major league record set in 1880 when they were known as the Chicago White Stockings.

== Regular season ==
Gabby Hartnett was the first National League catcher to win the MVP Award.

=== Season standings ===
National League
Team	W	L	Pct.	GB	Home	Road
Chicago Cubs	100	54	.649	—	56‍–‍21	44‍–‍33
St. Louis Cardinals	96	58	.623	4	53‍–‍24	43‍–‍34
New York Giants	91	62	.595	8½	50‍–‍27	41‍–‍35
Pittsburgh Pirates	86	67	.562	13½	46‍–‍31	40‍–‍36
Brooklyn Dodgers	70	83	.458	29½	38‍–‍38	32‍–‍45
Cincinnati Reds	68	85	.444	31½	41‍–‍35	27‍–‍50
Philadelphia Phillies	64	89	.418	35½	35‍–‍43	29‍–‍46
Boston Braves	38	115	.248	61½	25‍–‍50	13‍–‍65

=== Record vs. opponents ===
1935 National League record Sources:
Team	BSN	BRO	CHC	CIN	NYG	PHI	PIT	STL
Boston	—	6–16	3–19	10–12	5–16	8–14	2–20	4–18
Brooklyn	16–6	—	5–17	11–11	9–13	12–9–1	11–11	6–16
Chicago	19–3	17–5	—	14–8	14–8	13–9	15–7	8–14
Cincinnati	12–10	11–11	8–14	—	8–14–1	13–9	8–13	8–14
New York	16–5	13–9	8–14	14–8–1	—	12–10–2	14–8	14–8
Philadelphia	14–8	9–12–1	9–13	9–13	10–12–2	—	6–16	7–15
Pittsburgh	20–2	11–11	7–15	13–8	8–14	16–6	—	11–11
St. Louis	18–4	16–6	14–8	14–8	8–14	15–7	11–11	—

=== Roster ===
1935 Chicago Cubs
Roster
Pitchers: 18 Clay Bryant; 16 Tex Carleton; 21 Hugh Casey; 14 Larry French; 22 Roy Henshaw; 23 Roy Joiner; 24 Fabian Kowalik; 15 Bill Lee; 17 Charlie Root; 23 Clyde Shoun; 12 Lon Warneke	Catchers: 9 Gabby Hartnett; 41 Ken O'Dea; 42 Walter Stephenson; Infielders: 43 Phil Cavarretta; 1 Woody English; 8 Charlie Grimm; 39 Stan Hack; 2 Billy Herman; 11 Billy Jurges	Outfielders: 3 Kiki Cuyler; 6 Frank Demaree; 51 Augie Galan; 4 Chuck Klein; 7 Freddie Lindstrom; 5 Tuck Stainback; Other batters: 18 Johnny Gill	Manager: 8 Charlie Grimm; Coaches: 56 Red Corriden; 61 Roy Johnson

== Player stats ==
=== Batting ===
==== Starters by position ====
Note: Pos = Position; G = Games played; AB = At bats; H = Hits; Avg. = Batting average; HR = Home runs; RBI = Runs batted in

Pos	Player	G	AB	H	Avg.	HR	RBI
C	Gabby Hartnett	116	413	142	.344	13	91
1B	Phil Cavarretta	146	589	162	.275	8	82
2B	Billy Herman	154	666	227	.341	7	83
3B	Stan Hack	124	427	133	.311	4	64
SS	Billy Jurges	146	519	125	.241	1	59
OF	Chuck Klein	119	434	127	.293	21	73
OF	Augie Galan	154	646	203	.314	12	79
OF	Frank Demaree	107	385	125	.325	2	66

==== Other batters ====
Note: G = Games played; AB = At bats; H = Hits; Avg. = Batting average; HR = Home runs; RBI = Runs batted in

Player	G	AB	H	Avg.	HR	RBI
Freddie Lindstrom	90	342	94	.275	3	62
Ken O'Dea	76	202	52	.257	6	38
Kiki Cuyler	45	157	42	.268	4	18
Tuck Stainback	47	94	24	.255	3	11
Woody English	34	84	17	.202	2	8
Walter Stephenson	16	26	10	.385	0	2
Charlie Grimm	2	8	0	.000	0	0
Johnny Gill	3	3	1	.333	0	1

=== Pitching ===
==== Starting pitchers ====
Note: G = Games pitched; IP = Innings pitched; W = Wins; L = Losses; ERA = Earned run average; SO = Strikeouts

Player	G	IP	W	L	ERA	SO
Lon Warneke	41	261.2	20	13	3.06	120
Bill Lee	39	252.0	20	6	2.96	100
Larry French	42	246.1	17	10	2.96	90
Tex Carleton	31	171.0	11	8	3.89	84
Roy Henshaw	31	142.2	13	5	3.28	53

==== Other pitchers ====
Note: G = Games pitched; IP = Innings pitched; W = Wins; L = Losses; ERA = Earned run average; SO = Strikeouts

Player	G	IP	W	L	ERA	SO
Clyde Shoun	5	12.2	1	0	2.84	5

==== Relief pitchers ====
Note: G = Games pitched; W = Wins; L = Losses; SV = Saves; ERA = Earned run average; SO = Strikeouts

Player	G	W	L	SV	ERA	SO
Charlie Root	38	15	8	2	3.08	94
Fabian Kowalik	20	2	2	1	4.42	20
Hugh Casey	13	0	0	0	3.86	10
Clay Bryant	9	1	2	2	5.16	13
Roy Joiner	2	0	0	0	5.40	0

== 1935 World Series ==
=== Game 1 ===
October 2, 1935, at Navin Field in Detroit

Team	1	2	3	4	5	6	7	8	9	R	H	E
Chicago	2	0	0	0	0	0	0	0	1	3	7	0
Detroit	0	0	0	0	0	0	0	0	0	0	4	3
WP: Lon Warneke (1–0) LP: Schoolboy Rowe (0–1); Home runs: CHI: Frank Demaree (1); DET: None

=== Game 2 ===
October 3, 1935, at Navin Field in Detroit

Team	1	2	3	4	5	6	7	8	9	R	H	E
Chicago	0	0	0	0	1	0	2	0	0	3	6	1
Detroit	4	0	0	3	0	0	1	0	×	8	9	2
WP: Tommy Bridges (1–0) LP: Charley Root (0–1); Home runs: CHI: None; DET: Hank Greenberg (1)

=== Game 3 ===
October 4, 1935, at Wrigley Field in Chicago

Team	1	2	3	4	5	6	7	8	9	10	11	R	H	E
Detroit	0	0	0	0	0	1	0	4	0	0	1	6	12	2
Chicago	0	2	0	0	1	0	0	0	2	0	0	5	10	3
WP: Schoolboy Rowe (1–1) LP: Larry French (0–1); Home runs: DET: None; CHI: Frank Demaree (2)

=== Game 4 ===
October 5, 1935, at Wrigley Field in Chicago

Team	1	2	3	4	5	6	7	8	9	R	H	E
Detroit	0	0	1	0	0	1	0	0	0	2	7	0
Chicago	0	1	0	0	0	0	0	0	0	1	5	2
WP: Alvin Crowder (1–0) LP: Tex Carleton (0–1); Home runs: DET: None; CHI: Gabby Hartnett (1)

=== Game 5 ===
October 6, 1935, at Wrigley Field in Chicago

Team	1	2	3	4	5	6	7	8	9	R	H	E
Detroit	0	0	0	0	0	0	0	0	1	1	7	1
Chicago	0	0	2	0	0	0	1	0	×	3	8	0
WP: Lon Warneke (2–0) LP: Schoolboy Rowe (1–2) Sv: Bill Lee; Home runs: DET: None; CHI: Chuck Klein (1)

=== Game 6 ===
October 7, 1935, at Navin Field in Detroit

Team	1	2	3	4	5	6	7	8	9	R	H	E
Chicago	0	0	1	0	2	0	0	0	0	3	12	0
Detroit	1	0	0	1	0	1	0	0	1	4	12	1
WP: Tommy Bridges (2–0) LP: Larry French (0–2); Home runs: CHI: Billy Herman (1); DET: None

== Awards and honors ==
- Gabby Hartnett, National League MVP

=== League records ===
- Billy Herman, National League record, Most doubles in one season by a second baseman (57)

== Farm system ==
Level	Team	League	Manager
AA	Los Angeles Angels	Pacific Coast League	Jack Lelivelt
B	Peoria Tractors	Illinois–Indiana–Iowa League	Jack Sheehan and Bill Rodgers
B	Portsmouth Truckers	Piedmont League	Pip Koehler
C	Ponca City Angels	Western Association	Mike Gazella

LEAGUE CHAMPIONS: Ponca City

== See also ==
- List of Major League Baseball longest winning streaks
