= Johnny Vergez =

American baseball player (1906–1991)

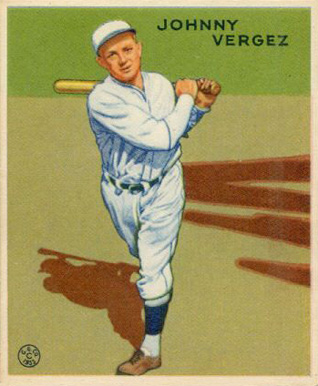
- Third baseman
- Born: July 9, 1906; Oakland, California, U.S.
- Died: July 15, 1991 (aged 85); Oroville, California, U.S.
- Batted: Right Threw: Right

MLB debut
- April 14, 1931, for the New York Giants

Last MLB appearance
- June 13, 1936, for the St. Louis Cardinals

MLB statistics
- Batting average: .255
- Home runs: 52
- Runs batted in: 292
- Stats at Baseball Reference

Teams
- New York Giants (1931–1934); Philadelphia Phillies (1935–1936); St. Louis Cardinals (1936)

Jean Louis Vergez (July 9, 1906 – July 15, 1991) was an American professional baseball player. A third baseman, his career lasted for 18 seasons (1926–43) and included all or parts of six years (1931–36) in Major League Baseball and extensive service in the Pacific Coast League (PCL). Born in Oakland, California, to French immigrants, he graduated from nearby Alameda High School and attended Saint Mary's College of California. Vergez threw and batted right-handed, stood 5 feet 8 inches (1.73 m) tall and weighed 165 pounds (75 kg).

Vergez achieved early success in 1929–30 with his hometown team, the Oakland Oaks: he batted over .300 each season, smashed 46 and 29 home runs, and was the PCL's All-Star third baseman in 1929. Acquired by the New York Giants, he succeeded Hall of Famer Freddie Lindstrom as the Giants' regular third baseman in 1931. Starting in 152 games as a rookie, Vergez reached career highs in hits, batting average (.278) and runs batted in (81).

But 1932 was a year marred by personal tragedy. Just prior to the start of the regular season, his infant son, John Louis, died after he was stricken with poliomyelitis. Although Vergez was able to play in 118 games, his production declined considerably. His manager, Bill Terry, assured the grieving Vergez a place on his 1933 roster. That season, Vergez rebounded to hit a career-high 16 home runs in 123 games. But, suffering from appendicitis, he could not play during the September stretch drive nor in the 1933 World Series, won by the Giants in five games with Travis Jackson at third base. Vergez' wife, Helen, also became ill during that time. The following season, 1934, saw a sharp fall-off in Vergez' play. He batted only .200 in 320 at bats in what would be his final campaign as a New York Giant.

On November 1, 1934, Vergez was traded to the second-division Philadelphia Phillies with Pretzel Pezzullo, Blondy Ryan, and George Watkins for shortstop Dick Bartell. He played in 148 games for the 1935 Phillies and led National League third basemen in double plays. But he hit only .249, and after appearing in only 15 games for the Phils in 1936, he was sold to the St. Louis Cardinals. The Cardinals gave him a nine-game trial, then sent him to the minor-league Sacramento Solons.

His MLB career at an end, Vergez played for almost eight full seasons in the Pacific Coast League with Sacramento (1936–38) and then, from 1939 to 1943, as the player-manager of the Oakland Oaks. He later scouted for the Giants and was the head baseball coach at Saint Mary's College, where he tutored future MLB third baseman Andy Carey. He died in 1991 at age 85 in Oroville, California.

| Preceded by Dutch Zwilling | Oakland Oaks manager 1939–1943 | Succeeded by Dolph Camilli |
