= Mickey Haslin =

American baseball player (1909-2002)

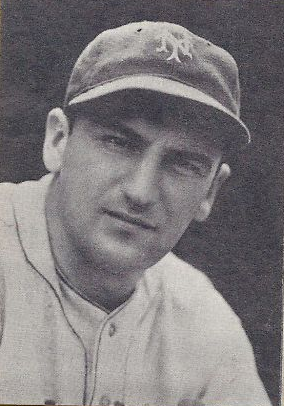
- Haslin as a member of the New York Giants, circa 1937–38
- Infielder
- Born: October 25, 1909; Wilkes-Barre, Pennsylvania, U.S.
- Died: March 7, 2002 (aged 92); Wilkes-Barre, Pennsylvania, U.S.
- Batted: Right Threw: Right

MLB debut
- September 7, 1933, for the Philadelphia Phillies

Last MLB appearance
- October 2, 1938, for the New York Giants

MLB statistics
- Batting average: .272
- Home runs: 9
- Runs batted in: 109
- Stats at Baseball Reference

Teams
- Philadelphia Phillies (1933–1936); Boston Bees (1936); New York Giants (1937–1938)

Michael Joseph "Mickey" Haslin (October 25, 1909 – March 7, 2002), born Michael Joseph Hazlinsky, was a Jewish-Austrian American professional baseball player whose career spanned 13 seasons, six of which were spent in Major League Baseball (MLB) with the Philadelphia Phillies (1933–36), Boston Bees (1936), and New York Giants (1937–38). Over his career in the majors, Haslin batted a combined .272 with 265 hits, 33 doubles, eight triples, nine home runs, and 109 runs batted in (RBIs) in 318 games played. He played shortstop, second base, and third base, defensively. Haslin also played in the semi-pros, and minor leagues before breaking into the majors.

In the minors, he played with the St. Catharines Brewers (1930), Stroudsburg Poconos (1932), Kansas City Blues (1937), Jersey City Giants (1938), San Diego Padres (1939–1941), Toronto Maple Leafs (1942), and Indianapolis Indians (1943). Haslin compiled a career minor league batting average of .311 with 881 hits, 155 doubles, 30 triples, and 43 home runs in 776 games played. He batted and threw right-handed. During his playing career, Haslin stood at 5 feet 8 inches (173 cm) and weighed 165 pounds (75 kg). After retirement from baseball, he served in the United States Army during World War II.

== Early and personal life ==
Mickey Haslin was born Michael Joseph Hazlinsky on October 25, 1909, in Wilkes-Barre, Pennsylvania to George and Helen Julia (née Kmetzová) Hazlinsky, both of Austria Hungary. George Hazlinsky worked in the Pennsylvania coal mines. Mickey Haslin had eight siblings: brothers George, Joseph, and John; and sisters Mary, Elizabeth, Anna, Susan, and Margaret. Mickey Haslin attended high school for just one year. From an early age, Haslin worked in the coal mines of his hometown. Haslin had a fear of insects and snakes, which many teammates used against him when playing practical jokes during his baseball career.

== Baseball career ==
In 1930, Haslin signed with the minor league St. Catharines Brewers of the Class-C Ontario League. With the Brewers, he batted .295 with 57 hits, five doubles, three triples, and three home runs in 50 games played. Defensively, he was used as a shortstop. Haslin spent the next season playing semi-professional baseball. He joined the Class-D Stroudsburg Poconos in 1932, a team that featured future Major League Baseball (MLB) player Goody Rosen. Stroudsburg were members of the Interstate League that season. In 26 games that year, Haslin batted .417 with 48 hits, 13 doubles, four triples, and seven home runs. In the field, he played second base, and shortstop.

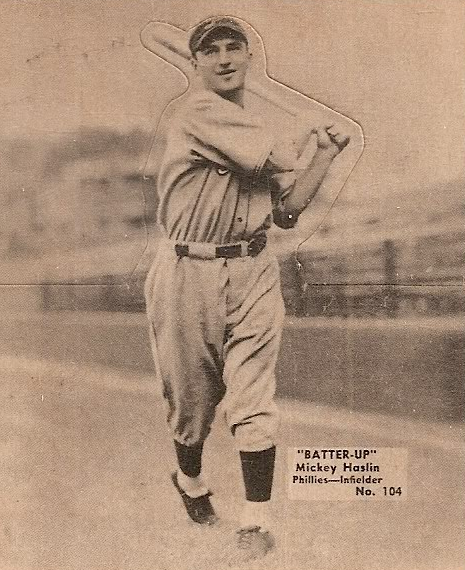
Haslin signed with the Philadelphia Phillies at the end of the 1933 season after being discovered by scout Patsy O'Rourke at a semi-professional baseball game in Stroudsburg, Pennsylvania.

At the start of the 1933 season, Haslin signed with the minor league Knoxville Smokies to play third base. However, he never made an appearance with that team. Instead, Haslin signed as a second baseman with a semi-professional baseball team, which represented Stroudsburg, Pennsylvania. Patsy O'Rourke, a scout for the Philadelphia Phillies, was in Stroudsburg visiting his wife who had been injured in an automobile accident. O'Rourke went to a semi-pro game which featured Haslin's team. His talent impressed O'Rourke, so he offered Haslin a major league contract with the Phillies on the spot. He made his MLB debut on September 7, against the St. Louis Cardinals. In that game, Haslin got his first major league hit, a double. He also walked once, and played the second base position. Haslin's first major league run batted in (RBI) came on September 14, in a game against the Cincinnati Reds. Over 26 games that season with the Phillies, he batted .236 with three runs scored, 21 hits, two doubles, nine RBIs, and one stolen base. Haslin played all of his 26 games at second base, committing six errors, and converting 12 assists in 137 total chances.

Haslin was used as the Philadelphia Phillies' starting shortstop at the beginning of the 1934 season after Dick Bartell, the Phillies every-day shortstop, suffered an injury. Haslin's first hit of the season came on April 12, against the Brooklyn Dodgers. He hit his first career major league home run on June 10, against the New York Giants. He finished the season with a .265 batting average, 28 runs scored, 44 hits, eight doubles, two triples, one home run, 11 RBIs, and one stolen base in 72 games played that year. Defensively, he was used as a utility infielder, playing 26 games at third base, 21 games at second base, and six games at shortstop.

In 1935, Haslin won the starting shortstop job for the Philadelphia Phillies over veteran Blondy Ryan. On April 18, during the top of the tenth inning in a game against the Brooklyn Dodgers, Haslin batted in the game-winning run to give the Phillies a 10–to–9 win. Haslin participated in the first-ever MLB night game that season, driving in the Phillies only run against the Cincinnati Reds in a 2–1 loss. During the season, it was reported that Haslin carried around a lump of coal as a good-luck charm, and a reminder of how far he has come from his days of mining in his home-town of Wilkes-Barre, Pennsylvania. In late-August, it was discovered that Haslin had appendicitis, causing him to miss time after recovering from emergency surgery to remove his vermiform appendix at Sacred Heart Hospital in Allentown, Pennsylvania. On the season, he batted .265 with 53 runs scored, 108 hits, 17 doubles, three triples, three home runs, 52 RBIs, and five stolen bases in 110 games played. In the field, Haslin played 87 games at shortstop, 11 games at third base, and nine games at second base.

Haslin joined the Philadelphia Phillies for spring training in Florida during the start of the 1936 season. After playing 16 games with the Phillies during the regular season, Haslin was traded to the Boston Bees in exchange for Pinky Whitney. He batted .344 with six runs scored, 22 hits, one double, one triple, and six RBIs in 16 games played with the Phillies, while playing 12 games at second base, and five games at third defensively. After his trade, the Bees manager, Bill McKechnie, suspended Haslin after he refused to report to the team until his demand of a higher salary was met. On May 15, he agreed to new contract terms and reported to the Boston club. On July 4, in a game against the New York Giants, Haslin hit two home runs. With Boston, he batted .279 with 14 runs scored, 29 hits, one double, two triples, two home runs, 11 RBIs in 36 games played. In the field, he played 17 games at third base, and seven games at second base.

During the off-season before the 1937 season, the Boston Bees traded Haslin to the New York Giants in exchange for Eddie Mayo. At the start of the 1937 season, Haslin was competing against Lou Chiozza, and Tommy Thevenow for the starting third baseman job. With the Giants that season, he batted .190 with eight runs scored, eight hits, one double, and five RBIs in 27 games played. He played nine games at shortstop, four games at second base, and four games at third base, defensively. In July, the Giants sent Haslin to the minor leagues. Major league scouts Bill Essick of the Cleveland Indians, and Eddie Herr of the New York Yankees watched Haslin make his debut in the minors that year with the Kansas City Blues to decide if he would be a good fit for their organizations. In 40 games in the minors that year, he batted .299 with 43 hits, eight doubles, three triples, and two home runs. In the field, Haslin played 28 games at shortstop.

Haslin began the 1938 season with the New York Giants. On May 23, Haslin was at-bat during the sixth inning of a game against the Pittsburgh Pirates when he hit a pitch from Pirates' starter Mace Brown, which went directly back to Brown and struck him in the ribs. After the Giants received Alex Kampouris in a trade from the Cincinnati Reds in June, Haslin was sent-down to the minor league Jersey City Giants of the Double-A International League. In the minors, he batted .310 with 122 hits, 17 doubles, seven triples, and five home runs in 101 games played. Defensively, he played all of his 101 games at second base. In September that year, Haslin was called up to play with the Giants for the remainder of the season. On September 22, Haslin hit two home runs in a game against the Cincinnati Reds. The final game of Haslin's major league career would come on October 2, in a game against the Boston Bees. On the season with New York, Haslin batted .324 with 33 hits, three doubles, three home runs, and 15 RBIs in 31 games played. He played 15 games at third base, and 13 games at second base that year.

On December 7, 1938, Haslin was traded by the New York Giants to the minor league San Diego Padres of the Double-A Pacific Coast League in exchange for Manny Salvo. The trade was originally intended to have two players go to the Padres, but San Diego's president Spider Baum agreed to take Haslin after he hear from baseball executives around the majors that he would "be lucky to land [him]". However, Haslin's tenure with the Padres started out rough after he failed to report to spring training until his demand of a higher salary was met. On March 18, Haslin joined the Padres, signing a contract worth US$600 a month, a third less than his original asking price of the US$900 a month. It was not the last of Haslin's issues that year, because after a game on May 10, he got into an argument with San Diego manager Cedric Durst over a matter Durst called "unimportant" and Haslin left the team's stadium. After the ordeal, Durst suspended Haslin and fined him US$100. During a game on June 25, against the Oakland Oaks, Haslin hit two home runs and drove in all the Padres runs leading them to a 5–2 victory. With the Padres that season, Haslin batted .345 with 185 hits, 29 doubles, five triples, and 11 home runs in 151 games played. In the field, he played all of his games at third base.

At the start of the 1940 season, Haslin refused a contract with the San Diego Padres, and held-out for what he hoped would be a better offer. On March 12, Padres president Charles Mel Lott called Haslin at his home in Wilkes-Barre, Pennsylvania to alert him that the San Diego would only wait ten more days for him to sign a contract for the 1940 season, or else they would release him. On March 25, two-days past Lott's ten-day window for Haslin to sign, he returned to San Diego to meet with Padres executives. Haslin reportedly asked Lott for a trade in that meeting. He also threatened to retire from baseball if he did not receive a higher salary. He reported to spring training on March 26, but was still unsigned. Haslin eventually signed with San Diego and played with them for the entire season. On the season, he batted .321 with 198 hits, 43 doubles, two triples, and nine home runs in 164 games played. Haslin played all of his games at third base. He was fourth in the Pacific Coast League in doubles that season.

Haslin reported to the San Diego Padres during spring training on March 3, 1940 . He was selected to play in the Pacific Coast League All-Star Game as a utility player that season. On the season, he batted .301 with 65 runs scored, 138 hits, 27 doubles, three triples, five home runs, 75 RBIs, and 10 stolen bases in 125 games played. In the field, he played exclusively at third base. At the start of the 1942 season, Haslin filed to report to spring training with the Padres, again seeking a higher salary. San Diego president Charles Mel Lott then traded Haslin to the Double-A Toronto Maple Leafs of the International League in exchange for John Hill. With Toronto that year, Haslin played just two games, getting one hit in five at-bats. He had to sit out the majority of the season with a leg injury, which he had surgery for during the off-season.

In February 1943, Haslin was traded from the Toronto Maple Leafs to the Double-A Indianapolis Indians of the American Association. With the Indians that season, he batted .239 with 32 runs scored, 89 hits, 13 doubles, three triples, one home run, and 50 RBIs. He played second, and third base, defensively. After the season, Haslin was purchased by the Double-A Atlanta Crackers of the Southern Association, but never made an appearance.

== Later life ==
After his baseball career, Haslin served in World War II as a Private in the United States Army. Haslin died on March 7, 2002, at the age of 92 in his home-town of Wilkes-Barre, Pennsylvania. He was buried at Saint Mary's Cemetery in Wilkes-Barre.
