= Art Bramhall =

American baseball player (1909-1985)

- Art Bramhall at WIBA radio, 1941
- Shortstop / Third baseman
- Born: February 22, 1909; Oak Park, Illinois, U.S.
- Died: September 4, 1985 (aged 76); Madison, Wisconsin, U.S.
- Batted: Right Threw: Right

MLB debut
- April 18, 1935, for the Philadelphia Phillies

Last MLB appearance
- April 26, 1935, for the Philadelphia Phillies

MLB statistics
- Games played: 2
- At bats: 1
- Batting average: .000
- Stats at Baseball Reference

Teams
- Philadelphia Phillies (1935)

Arthur Washington Bramhall (February 22, 1909 – September 4, 1985) was an American baseball, basketball, and American football player. He played minor league baseball from 1930 to 1935 and in Major League Baseball for the Philadelphia Phillies in 1935. He also played professional basketball and football. After his playing career ended, he worked as a sportscaster for radio stations in Wisconsin.

== Early years ==
Bramhall was born in 1909 in Oak Park, Illinois, and attended Oak Park High School and St. Mel High School. He was the star forward of the 1929 St. Mel's basketball team that was coached by football great Paddy Driscoll. He also attended DePaul University.

== Professional athlete ==
=== Baseball ===
He played professional baseball from 1930 to 1935, including two games in Major League Baseball with the 1935 Philadelphia Phillies. He was known for his fielding, rather than batting. At the time of his promotion to the Phillies, The Capital Times wrote: "Bramhall is a fine fielder, fast and possesses a splendid throwing arm, and if he can hit at a .250 clip he will remain with the Phils all season." His major-league career began and ended in April 1935.

His minor league baseball career included stints with the Springfield Senators (1930), Reading Keystones (1932), Harrisburg Senators (1932), Binghamton Triplets (1932), and Madison Blues (1933–1934).

=== Basketball and football ===
Bramhall also played professional basketball and football, making him one of the few athletes who ever played at the professional level in all three sports. For three seasons from approximately 1930 to 1932, he played professional basketball as a forward for the Chicago Bruins of the American Basketball League. In 1931, he was described as "one of the best basketball players in the game", the "life of the party" and the Bruins' "super-showman." He also reportedly "travelled on the stage with a basketball act." In 1934, he played for the Chicago Circus Clowns, a traveling basketball team that played in full clown suits against local teams.

Bramhall's professional football career is not as well documented, but some sources assert that he played, at least briefly, with the Chicago Bears in the early 1930s. The football Bears and basketball Bruins were under the common ownership of George Halas.

== Later years ==
After his career as an athlete ended, Bramhall and his wife operated a restaurant and bar, Justo's, in Madison, Wisconsin, from 1939 to 1971. He was also a sports broadcaster on Wisconsin radio stations in the late 1930s and 1940s. Beginning in 1942, his broadcasting career included radio play-by-play for Wisconsin Badgers football games. Bramhall died in 1985 at age 76 in Madison.
