= Chiozza =

Chiozza may refer to:

- an archaic form of the name of Chioggia, Veneto, Italy
- a borough of Castiglione di Garfagnana, Tuscany, Italy
- a borough of Scandiano, Emilia-Romagna, Italy
- Chiozza (surname), people with the surname Chiozza
