= Walter Stephenson =

American baseball player (1911–1993)

- Catcher
- Born: March 27, 1911; Saluda, North Carolina, U.S.
- Died: July 4, 1993 (aged 82); Shreveport, Louisiana, U.S.
- Batted: Right Threw: Right

MLB debut
- April 29, 1935, for the Chicago Cubs

Last MLB appearance
- September 30, 1937, for the Philadelphia Phillies

MLB statistics
- Batting average: .279
- At-bats: 61
- Hits: 17
- Stats at Baseball Reference

Teams
- Chicago Cubs (1935–1936); Philadelphia Phillies (1937)

Walter McQueen Stephenson (March 27, 1911 – July 4, 1993), nicknamed "Tarzen", was an American professional baseball player who played catcher in the Major Leagues from 1935 to 1937. He played for the Chicago Cubs and Philadelphia Phillies.
