= Dino Chiozza =

American baseball player (1912-1972)

- Shortstop
- Born: June 30, 1912; Memphis, Tennessee, U.S.
- Died: April 23, 1972 (aged 59); Memphis, Tennessee, U.S.
- Batted: Left Threw: Right

MLB debut
- July 14, 1935, for the Philadelphia Phillies

Last MLB appearance
- July 15, 1935, for the Philadelphia Phillies

MLB statistics
- At-bats: 0
- Runs: 1
- Stats at Baseball Reference

Teams
- Philadelphia Phillies (1935)

Dino "Dynamo" Joseph Chiozza (June 30, 1912 – April 23, 1972) was an American Major League Baseball shortstop who played for one season.

== Career ==
Chiozza played for the Philadelphia Phillies in two games during the 1935 Philadelphia Phillies season, appearing as a late-inning pinch runner and/or defensive replacement on both occasions. In both games, he appeared at shortstop, while his brother Lou Chiozza played second base. He never had a plate appearance, although in his second and final game, he was on deck in the 10th inning when George Watkins flied out to end the inning. The Phillies, playing on the road, then lost the game in the bottom of the 10th.

== Personal life ==
Chiozza was a practicing Catholic and is known to have advocated for racial equality in his home parish of St. Therese Catholic Church. He died in 1972 and is buried at Calvary Cemetery in Memphis.
