= Wayne Osborne (baseball) =

American baseball player (1912–1987)

- Pitcher
- Born: October 11, 1912; Watsonville, California, U.S.
- Died: March 13, 1987 (aged 74); Vancouver, Washington, U.S.
- Batted: Right Threw: Right

MLB debut
- April 18, 1935, for the Pittsburgh Pirates

Last MLB appearance
- May 6, 1936, for the Boston Bees

MLB statistics
- Win–loss record: 1–1
- Earned run average: 5.91
- Strikeouts: 9
- Stats at Baseball Reference

Teams
- Pittsburgh Pirates (1935); Boston Bees (1936)

Wayne Harold Osborne (October 11, 1912 – March 13, 1987) was an American professional baseball pitcher, who played in Major League Baseball (MLB) for the Pittsburgh Pirates (1935) and Boston Bees (1936). He batted left-handed and threw right-handed.

Osborne was born in Watsonville, California, and went straight from high school onto the Portland Beavers in 1931 and the Mission Reds from 1932 to 1934.

In Osborne's two-season major league pitching career, his statistical accomplishments include posting a 1–1 win–loss record, with nine strikeouts, and a 5.91 earned run average (ERA), in 21 1/3 innings pitched.

On February 7, 1942, Osborne signed an agreement to be an extra in the movie The Pride of The Yankees for the rate of $52.50 per week (equivalent to $794.66 in 2024).

After retiring from baseball, Osborne went into radio broadcasting in the Chicago area, calling Chicago Cubs games with Bert Wilson in 1945 and later serving as chief announcer for station WOPA.

On March 13, 1987, Osborne died in Vancouver, Washington, at the age of 74.
