= Aubrey Epps =

American baseball player (1912–1984)

- Catcher
- Born: March 3, 1912; Memphis, Tennessee, U.S.
- Died: November 13, 1984 (aged 72); Ackerman, Mississippi, U.S.
- Batted: Right Threw: Right

MLB debut
- September 29, 1935, for the Pittsburgh Pirates

Last MLB appearance
- September 29, 1935, for the Pittsburgh Pirates

MLB statistics
- Hits: 3
- Batting average: .750
- RBI: 3
- Stats at Baseball Reference

Teams
- Pittsburgh Pirates (1935)

Aubrey Lee ("Yo-Yo") Epps (March 3, 1912 – November 13, 1984) was an American Major League Baseball catcher. He was born in Memphis, Tennessee. He batted and threw right-handed, was 5 foot 10 inches, and 170 pounds. Epps played just one major league game in his career, but he played well, going 3 for 4 (a .750 average) with 3 RBIs in his only major league game, playing for the Pittsburgh Pirates on September 29, 1935. Epps died on November 13,1984 in Ackerman, Mississippi.

Epps started his professional career in the minor leagues in 1933, splitting a partial season with six games at Longview of the Class C Dixie League and 30 games with the Birmingham Barons of the Class A Southern Association. In 1934, in his first full season, he played 152 games for the Barons and finished the season with three home runs and a .301 batting average. The Pittsburgh Pirates acquired Epps from the Barons in September 1934, under a deal in which Epps would finish the season with the Barons, would not play outfield and would be used exclusively as a catcher and would report to the Pirates' spring training camp in California in advance of the 1935 season. Epps split his 1935 minor league season, playing 59 games with the Barons and 26 with Fort Worth of the Class A Texas League, finishing with an overall .288 batting average in the minors that season.

In the final game of the 1935 season, in the second game of a doubleheader against the Cincinnati Reds, Epps played catcher and went 3 for 4, with two singles, a triple, and three runs batted in, to go along with two errors, as the Pirates lost their season finale to the Reds by a score of 9–6. While the Pirates had high hopes for Epps, this one game turned out to be the only major league game of his career.

Epps underwent a tonsillectomy in mid-October 1935, expecting to see his health improve towards earning a spot as the Pirates' starting catcher in the 1936 season. However, Epps experienced hemorrhages that forced him back into the hospital in critical condition two days later, with his breathing impairment leading to pneumonia and his placement under an oxygen tent. By the end of December 1935, Epps had been released from the hospital and was recovering in his home in Memphis, Tennessee, with his doctor telling him that he should avoid spending time outdoors until warmer weather arrived. Epps informed Pirates management in a letter to team president Bill Benswanger of his status and said that he expected to be with the team when it opened training camp. By the time the Pirates players reported to San Antonio, Texas for spring training in March 1936, Epps was on the team's roster, hoping to make a comeback as catcher, having recovered from his pneumonia.

Epps played another six seasons in the minor leagues, playing in the organizations of the Pirates, New York Yankees, New York Giants and Chicago Cubs, but never played another major league game before leaving professional baseball after the 1941 season.
