= Pretzel Pezzullo =

American baseball player (1910–1990)

- Pitcher
- Born: December 10, 1910; Bridgeport, Connecticut, U.S.
- Died: May 16, 1990 (aged 79); Dallas, Texas, U.S.
- Batted: Left Threw: Left

MLB debut
- April 18, 1935, for the Philadelphia Phillies

Last MLB appearance
- April 15, 1936, for the Philadelphia Phillies

MLB statistics
- Win–loss record: 3–5
- Earned run average: 6.36
- Strikeouts: 24
- Stats at Baseball Reference

Teams
- Philadelphia Phillies (1935–1936)

John "Pretzel" Pezzullo (December 10, 1910 – May 16, 1990) was a professional baseball player whose career spanned eight seasons, two of which were spent with the Major League Baseball (MLB) Philadelphia Phillies. Pezzullo, a pitcher, compiled an earned run average (ERA) of 6.36, allowing 61 earned runs off of 116 hits, five home runs, and 51 walks while recording 24 strikeouts over 86 1/3 innings pitched. Pezzullo also played in six seasons of minor league baseball. He made his MLB debut at the age of 24 after spending a season in the minor leagues for the New York Giants organization. Pezzullo earned the nicknamed "Pretzel" after his unusual pitching style. After retiring from baseball, Pezzullo moved to Dallas, Texas, where he died of cancer on May 16, 1990.

== Early life ==
Pezzullo was born on December 10, 1910, in Bridgeport, Connecticut. He had four siblings and is of Italian ancestry. Pezzullo attended school until the eighth grade, after which he went to trade school to learn cabinet and pattern making. He was officially listed as standing 5 feet 11 inches (180 cm) and weighing 180 pounds (82 kg) when he played professionally.

== Professional career ==
Pezzullo began his professional baseball career in 1934, when he played for the Richmond Colts, an affiliate of the New York Giants. Pezzullo finished the season fifth in the Piedmont League in wins, with 16, while finishing fourth on the Colts in games pitched, recording 27 games over the season. He was called "a good pitching prospect" by Chicago Tribune sports writer Arch Ward. On November 1 of that year, Pezzullo was traded as a part of a four-man deal that sent him, Blondy Ryan, Johnny Vergez, George Watkins, and cash to the Philadelphia Phillies in exchange for Dick Bartell. For the 1935 season, Pezzullo, who pitched for the major-league Phillies, recorded a team-worst ERA of 6.40, along with a 3–5 win–loss record over 40 games pitched. He hit seven batters by a pitch, tying him for the seventh most hit batsmen in MLB. In Pezzullo's final MLB game in 1936, he walked six batters in two innings pitched.

=== Minor league career ===
Pezzullo also played for two minor league teams during the 1936 season: the Richmond Colts and the Hazleton Mountaineers. Combined, Pezzullo went 14–10 with a 5.19 ERA. The following season he played for the Savannah Indians and the Colts; for the Indians, Pezzullo went 13–8 over 165 innings pitched. The following season, he played only for the Indians, an affiliate of the Pittsburgh Pirates. His 26 wins were best in the Sally League, while his 288 innings pitched also led all Southern League players. In a game against the Spartanburg Spartans, Pezzullo struck out 17 batters. After the season, he was sold to the double-A Toronto Maple Leafs of the International League, where, under managers Tony Lazzeri and Jack Burns, Pezzullo won 11 games and lost 12. He went 5–16 the following year, before leaving the team for the Syracuse Chiefs and the Buffalo Bisons in his final year of professional baseball in 1941.

== After baseball ==
After retiring from baseball, Pezzullo moved to Dallas, Texas, where he married Betty (née Tolcyk) and had one daughter, Patti Moore. In Dallas, he designed aircraft missile models and founded Gulf Industries, a Grand Prairie-based model subcontracting firm. Pezzullo died on May 16, 1990, of cancer. Funeral processions were held on May 18 at Holy Redeemer Mausoleum Chapel in DeSoto, Texas, where he was interred.

== See also ==
- Philadelphia Phillies all-time roster (P–Q)
