= Euel Moore =

American baseball player (1908-1989)

- Pitcher
- Born: May 27, 1908; Reagan, Oklahoma, U.S.
- Died: February 12, 1989 (aged 80); Tishomingo, Oklahoma, U.S.
- Batted: Right Threw: Right

MLB debut
- July 8, 1934, for the Philadelphia Phillies

Last MLB appearance
- July 26, 1936, for the Philadelphia Phillies

MLB statistics
- Win–loss record: 9–16
- Earned run average: 5.48
- Strikeouts: 75
- Stats at Baseball Reference

Teams
- Philadelphia Phillies (1934–1935); New York Giants (1935); Philadelphia Phillies (1936)

Euel Walton Moore (May 27, 1908 – February 12, 1989) nicknamed "Chief" was an American professional baseball pitcher in Major League Baseball. He played for the Philadelphia Phillies and New York Giants.

In 1930, Moore pitched a no-hitter in the Texas League for the San Antonio Indians.

Moore was a Chickasaw. After his baseball career, he served in the U.S. Army in World War II and then for 27 years as a game ranger in Oklahoma.

Moore died on February 12, 1989, aged 80.
