= Leon Chagnon =

American baseball player (1902–1953)

- Pitcher
- Born: September 28, 1902; Pittsfield, New Hampshire, U.S.
- Died: July 30, 1953 (aged 50); Amesbury, Massachusetts, U.S.
- Batted: Right Threw: Right

MLB debut
- October 5, 1929, for the Pittsburgh Pirates

Last MLB appearance
- August 8, 1935, for the New York Giants

MLB statistics
- Win–loss record: 19–16
- Earned run average: 4.51
- Strikeouts: 153
- Stats at Baseball Reference

Teams
- Pittsburgh Pirates (1929–1930, 1932–1934); New York Giants (1935)

Leon Wilbur Chagnon (September 28, 1902 – July 30, 1953) was an American professional baseball pitcher. He played all or part of six seasons in Major League Baseball, between 1929 and 1935, for the Pittsburgh Pirates and New York Giants.

Chagon died on July 30, 1953, and was buried in Mount Prospect Cemetery in Amesbury, Massachusetts.
