= Lou Chiozza =

American baseball player (1910-1971)

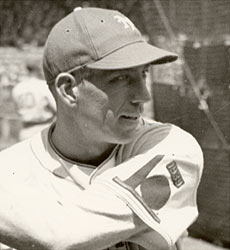
- Infielder / Center fielder
- Born: May 17, 1910; Tallulah, Louisiana, U.S.
- Died: February 28, 1971 (aged 60); Memphis, Tennessee, U.S.
- Batted: Left Threw: Right

MLB debut
- April 17, 1934, for the Philadelphia Phillies

Last MLB appearance
- July 17, 1939, for the New York Giants

MLB statistics
- Batting average: .277
- Home runs: 14
- Runs batted in: 197
- Stats at Baseball Reference

Teams
- Philadelphia Phillies (1934–1936); New York Giants (1937–1939)

Louis Peo Chiozza (May 11, 1910 – February 28, 1971) was an American professional baseball player who played a total of six seasons with the Philadelphia Phillies and New York Giants of Major League Baseball.

== Early life ==
Chiozza was born on Tuesday, May 11, 1910, in Tallulah, Louisiana. As a youngster, Lou's family moved to Memphis, Tennessee, where he developed into an all-around athlete engaging in basketball, boxing, track, football and handball, as well as baseball. As a multi-sport star in High School, Lou suffered a serious knee injury while playing football which almost ended his career, yet he came back from that to become one of the fastest men in professional baseball. Lou attended Christian Brothers High School, as did future major league baseball players and world series participants Phil Gagliano, Tim McCarver, and current Philadelphia Phillies infielder Logan Forsythe.

Chiozza retired from the other sports when he signed to play shortstop for the Memphis Chicks in 1931.

=== Family ties ===
Lou was 23 years old when he was drafted by the Philadelphia Phillies at the close of the 1933 season, and alternated between the infield and outfield for them until the close of the 1936 season. Lou's brother Dino Chiozza appeared in two games for the 1935 Phillies (appearing as a late-inning defensive replacement in games on July 14 and 15) and they were one of the first sets of brothers to play on the same team in major league baseball. Another brother, Joe, also played professional baseball but did not make it out of the minor leagues.

=== Leadoff batter in first night game ===
While playing for the Phillies, Chiozza was the first major league player in history to bat in a major league night game. He was the leadoff man for the Phillies when he appeared against the Reds in Cincinnati in the first night game in the majors on May 24, 1935. (Chiozza grounded out to shortstop.) In attendance at the game was Ford Frick, president of the National League. In the White House, president Franklin D. Roosevelt pressed a button that lit up Crosley Field, where a crowd of 20,422 fans, sizable for a last-place team in the middle of the Great Depression, came out to watch the game. Also in 1935, in a game played on July 7, Lou Chiozza tied an NL record with 11 assists in a 9–1 win over Boston.

=== Lou supplies end for Babe Ruth ===
On May 30, 1935, the Phillies were playing against the Boston Braves at Baker Bowl, the old cracker-box park of the old Philadelphia Nationals. Babe Ruth was playing left field at age 40 for the Braves in the opening game of a doubleheader. Just a few days before the Philadelphia series, the Babe hit three home runs in Pittsburgh -- however he was still hitting under .200 for the season, and his fielding was noticeably weak. In fact, Ruth had suffered an embarrassing incident only two days before in Cincinnati, wherein the fifth inning of a game at Crosley Field several Reds players (either by chance or by design) hit ball after ball into left field; Ruth misplayed or mishandled the majority of them. Although no errors were charged to Ruth, five runs were scored in the inning on what should have been routine outs.

Two days later, the stage was set for Ruth's very last major league appearance ... although no one knew it would be happening. In the bottom of the first (of the first game) with two outs, Chiozza hit a short fly ball down the left field line that would have ordinarily at best been a double. Due to his advanced age and decreased mobility, Ruth stumbled after the ball in the outfield, wrenching his knee in the process. He did eventually catch up with the ball, relaying it to the shortstop, who threw the ball home to barely stop Chiozza from an inside-the-park home run. The inning ended, but as the other Braves players returned to the dugout, Ruth stood for a minute, then folded his glove and walked off the field into the clubhouse behind the centerfield fence. There was some applause, as it was clear Ruth was leaving the game (he exited virtually every game he played in 1935 early.) But he did not return for the second game, and never played another major league game again; his very last play on a major league field was the misplayed ball and outfield assist that eventually nailed Chiozza at the plate. The Babe knew he was done, and he officially retired a few days later on June 2, 1935.

Chiozza went 3-for-4 in the game with 4 RBIs, in an 11-6 Phillies victory. But Chiozza recalled in his later life that he had wished Ruth had retired on a high note after hitting the three home runs in Pittsburgh rather than waiting to play the next series in Philadelphia.

=== Traded to Giants ===
On December 8, 1936, Lou was sold to the New York Giants, for George Scharein and cash, and was then used as a utility infielder and outfielder by the Giants. He played second, third and the outfield with the Giants through the 1939 season. Towards the end of the 1939 season, Chiozza collided with outfielder Jo-Jo Moore while chasing a pop-up hit by St. Louis Cardinals Jim Brown, which resulted in a compound leg fracture ending his season. Lou attempted a return in 1940, but was not able to return to his pre-injury level of play at which he retired from the game. He had a lifetime batting average of .277, with .304 in his rookie year the best mark of his career.

== Later life in Memphis ==
Following his retirement from baseball, Chiozza moved back to Memphis where he worked as a local liquor dealer and grocery store owner. He married the former Catherine Lucchesi and had five children. Chiozza died on February 28, 1971, and is buried at Calvary Cemetery in Memphis.
