= Dick Bartell =

American baseball player (1907–1995)

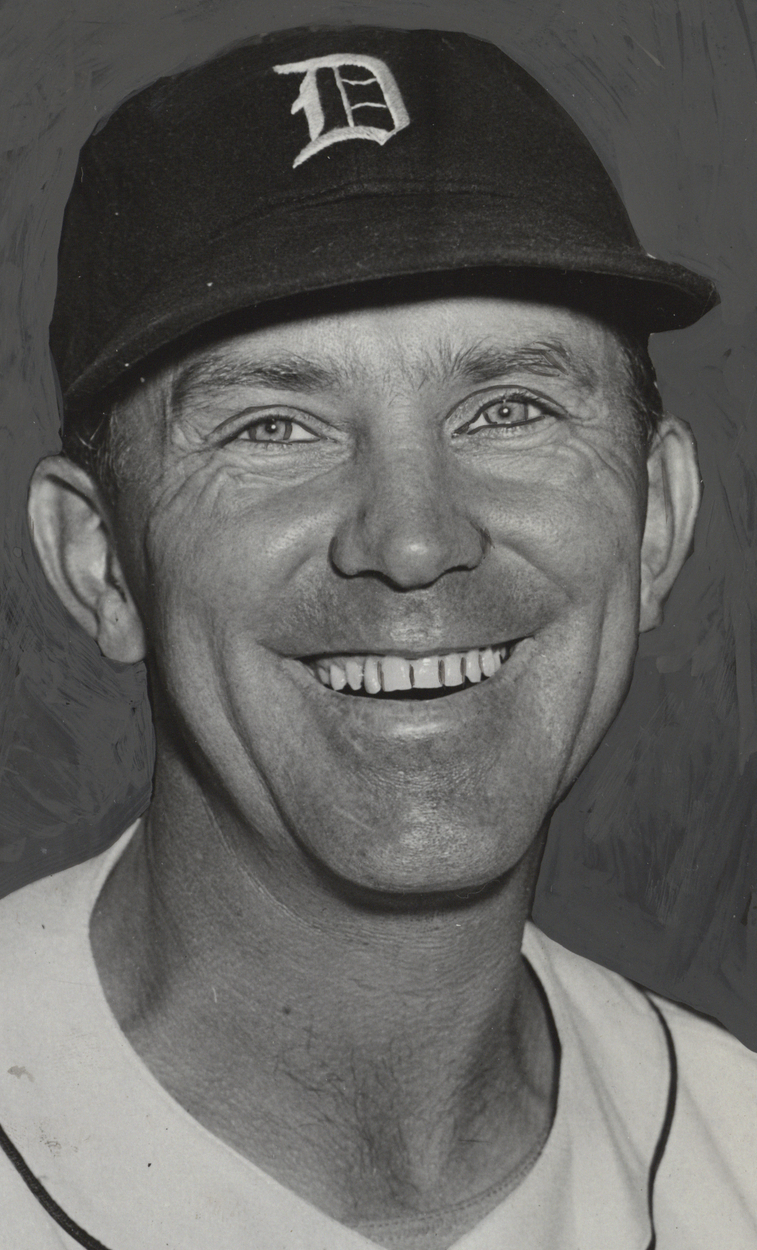
- Shortstop
- Born: November 22, 1907; Chicago, Illinois, U.S.
- Died: August 4, 1995 (aged 87); Alameda, California, U.S.
- Batted: Right Threw: Right

MLB debut
- October 2, 1927, for the Pittsburgh Pirates

Last MLB appearance
- May 24, 1946, for the New York Giants

MLB statistics
- Batting average: .284
- Hits: 2,165
- Home runs: 79
- Runs batted in: 710
- Stats at Baseball Reference

Teams
- Pittsburgh Pirates (1927–1930); Philadelphia Phillies (1931–1934); New York Giants (1935–1938); Chicago Cubs (1939); Detroit Tigers (1940–1941); New York Giants (1941–1943, 1946)

Career highlights and awards
- 2× All-Star (1933, 1937)

Richard William Bartell (November 22, 1907 – August 4, 1995), nicknamed "Rowdy Richard", was an American professional baseball player, coach, and manager. He played in Major League Baseball (MLB) as a shortstop from 1927 to 1946. One of the most ferocious competitors of his era, he won both admirers and critics at each stop during a career which saw him traded every few seasons, often under acrimonious circumstances. While hitting .300 over a full season five times, the two-time National League All-Star led the National League in double plays four times and in putouts and assists three times each. From 1927 through 1946, Bartell played for the Pittsburgh Pirates (1927–30), Philadelphia Phillies (1931–34), New York Giants (1935–38, 1941), Chicago Cubs (1939) and Detroit Tigers (1940–1941). After two years of military service in World War II, he played briefly in 1946 before retiring. At 5'9" and 160 pounds, he batted and threw right-handed.

== Career ==
A native of Chicago, who grew up in Alameda, California (and received the Cal-Hi State baseball player of the year while at Alameda High school in 1926), Bartell played in three World Series and the 1933 All-Star Game, the first to be played. He had one year in the minors, 1926, with the class A Bridgeport Bears in the Eastern League, where he hit .280 in 148 games. At 19, Bartell was the youngest player in the National League. He appeared in only one game at the end of the season, drawing two walks in four plate appearances. He played flawlessly in the field with five chances and one double play. The Pirates lost to the Yankees in four games and the team had to wait until 1960 to make amends.

With an aggressive style of play and fiery attitude which earned him his nickname, Bartell was a competent shortstop with good hands and a strong throwing arm. A skillful hitter, he batted a career-high .320 in 1930. After three seasons over .300 with Pittsburgh, he was traded to the Phillies in 1931, and had collected seasons of 40 doubles and 100 runs three times each by 1934. Bartell helped Philadelphia's perennial cellar-dwellers finish in fourth place in the 1932 season, for the only first-division finish by a Phillies team in a span of 32 seasons (1918–42). In 1933 he was elected to the first All-Star Game, and again in 1937.

Traded to the New York Giants before the 1935 season, Bartell helped the team win two NL pennants (1936–37), and hit .381 in the 1936 World Series. Leading off for the Giants in the Brooklyn Dodgers home opener in 1937, he complained when the first pitch was called a strike – and was promptly hit in the chest with a tomato thrown from the stands. He later played with the Chicago Cubs in 1939. In 1940, his first season in the American League, he teamed up with second baseman Charlie Gehringer to give the Tigers an AL pennant. Bartell started 1941 with Detroit but returned to the Giants in the midseason as a player-coach.

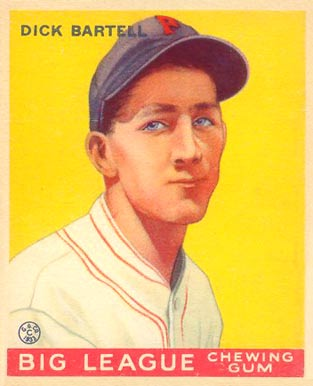
Dick Bartell card

In an 18-season career, Bartell posted a .284 batting average with 79 home runs and 710 runs batted in in 2,016 games played. He also finished with 1,130 runs, 2,165 hits, 442 doubles, 71 triples, 109 stolen bases and 748 bases on balls. Defensively, he recorded an overall .955 fielding percentage playing primarily at shortstop but also at third and second base. In 18 World Series games, he hit .294 (20-for-68) with 10 runs, 6 doubles, 1 home run, 7 RBI and 7 walks.

Bartell later managed in the minor leagues and coached for the Tigers (1949–52) and Cincinnati Redlegs (1954–55). He died on August 4, 1995, in Alameda at age 87 after suffering from Alzheimer's disease.

He is interred at the Chapel of the Chimes columbarium.

== See also ==
- Bay Area Sports Hall of Fame
- List of Major League Baseball career hits leaders
- List of Major League Baseball career doubles leaders
- List of Major League Baseball career runs scored leaders
