= George Watkins (baseball) =

American baseball player (1900–1970)

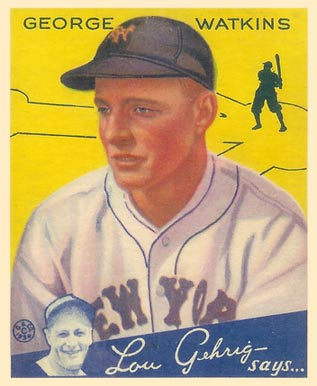
- Outfielder
- Born: June 4, 1900; Freestone County, Texas, U.S.
- Died: June 1, 1970 (aged 69); Houston, Texas, U.S.
- Batted: Left Threw: Right

MLB debut
- April 15, 1930, for the St. Louis Cardinals

Last MLB appearance
- September 27, 1936, for the Brooklyn Dodgers

MLB statistics
- Batting average: .288
- Home runs: 73
- Runs batted in: 420
- Stats at Baseball Reference

Teams
- St. Louis Cardinals (1930–1933); New York Giants (1934); Philadelphia Phillies (1935–1936); Brooklyn Dodgers (1936)

Career highlights and awards
- World Series champion (1931)

George Archibald Watkins (June 4, 1900 – June 1, 1970) was an American Major League Baseball player, born in Freestone County, Texas who owns the National League record for the highest batting average in his rookie season, batting .373 in his rookie year of 1930, with the St. Louis Cardinals.

Watkins went on to play until the 1936 season with the New York Giants (1934), the Philadelphia Phillies (1935–1936), and Brooklyn Dodgers (1936), never again posting a batting average over .312. On June 24, 1931, he hit three home runs in one game.

In 894 games played, Watkins compiled a .288 batting average (925–3,207) with 490 runs scored, 73 home runs, 420 RBI, a .347 on-base percentage and a .443 slugging percentage in seven major league seasons. He posted a career .956 fielding percentage. In nine World Series games, he batted .231 (6–26), scoring six runs, with two home runs and three RBI. He died in Houston, Texas on June 1, 1970, three days before his 70th birthday.
