= 1936 Boston Bees season =

1936 Boston Bees
- League: National League
- Ballpark: The Bee Hive
- City: Boston, Massachusetts
- Record: 71–83 (.461)
- League place: 6th
- Owners: J.A. Robert Quinn
- Managers: Bill McKechnie
- Radio: WNAC (Fred Hoey)

The 1936 Boston Bees season was the 66th season of the franchise. The team finished sixth in the National League with a record of 71–83, 21 games behind the New York Giants. This was their first season under the nickname of Bees, which they would keep until 1940.

== Offseason ==
Near the end of the debacle of the 1935 season, Emil Fuchs gave up his share of the team and retired. Major League Baseball took control of the team to finish out the season and then sold it before the 1936 season began. The new owners put advertisements in the paper asking the public to come up with a new name for the team. Thus, the Boston Bees were born and the team's ballpark was renamed "The Bee Hive."

=== Notable transactions ===
- December 12, 1935: Ed Brandt and Randy Moore were traded by the Braves to the Brooklyn Dodgers for Tony Cuccinello, Ray Benge, Al López, and Bobby Reis.

== Regular season ==
=== Season standings ===
National League
Team	W	L	Pct.	GB	Home	Road
New York Giants	92	62	.597	—	52‍–‍26	40‍–‍36
St. Louis Cardinals	87	67	.565	5	43‍–‍33	44‍–‍34
Chicago Cubs	87	67	.565	5	50‍–‍27	37‍–‍40
Pittsburgh Pirates	84	70	.545	8	46‍–‍30	38‍–‍40
Cincinnati Reds	74	80	.481	18	42‍–‍34	32‍–‍46
Boston Bees	71	83	.461	21	35‍–‍43	36‍–‍40
Brooklyn Dodgers	67	87	.435	25	37‍–‍40	30‍–‍47
Philadelphia Phillies	54	100	.351	38	30‍–‍48	24‍–‍52

=== Record vs. opponents ===
1936 National League record Sources:
Team	BSN	BRO	CHC	CIN	NYG	PHI	PIT	STL
Boston	—	10–12–2	6–16	13–9	9–13	12–10	8–14–1	13–9
Brooklyn	12–10–2	—	7–15	9–13	9–13	12–10	9–13	9–13
Chicago	16–6	15–7	—	10–12	11–11	16–6	10–12	9–13
Cincinnati	9–13	13–9	12–10	—	9–13	13–9	8–14	10–12
New York	13–9	13–9	11–11	13–9	—	17–5	15–7	10–12
Philadelphia	10–12	10–12	6–16	9–13	5–17	—	7–15	7–15
Pittsburgh	14–8–1	13–9	12–10	14–8	7–15	15–7	—	9–13–1
St. Louis	9–13	13–9	13–9	12–10	12–10	15–7	13–9–1	—

=== Roster ===
1936 Boston Bees
Roster
Pitchers: 21 Johnny Babich; 18 Ray Benge; 36 Al Blanche; 17 Bob Brown; 25 Guy Bush; 16 Ben Cantwell; 15 Tiny Chaplin; 29 Art Doll; -- Bill Ford; 25 Gene Ford; -- Fabian Kowalik; 17 Johnny Lanning; 14 Danny MacFayden; 40 Jim McCloskey; 26 Amby Murray; -- Wayne Osborne; 24 Bobby Reis; 32 Bob Smith; 28 Ken Weafer; 9 Roy Weir	Catchers: 8 Bill Lewis; 7 Al López; 20 Ray Mueller; Infielders: 22 Joe Coscarart; 3 Tony Cuccinello; 6 Mickey Haslin; 5 Buck Jordan; 20 Swede Larsen; 2 Billy Urbanski; 30 Rabbit Warstler; -- Pinky Whitney	Outfielders: 4 Wally Berger; 10 Hal Lee; 1 Gene Moore; 13 Tommy Thompson; Other batters: -- Ed Moriarty; 19 Andy Pilney	Manager: 33 Bill McKechnie; Coach: 31 Hank Gowdy

== Player stats ==
=== Batting ===
==== Starters by position ====
Note: Pos = Position; G = Games played; AB = At bats; H = Hits; Avg. = Batting average; HR = Home runs; RBI = Runs batted in

Pos	Player	G	AB	H	Avg.	HR	RBI
C	Al López	128	426	103	.242	7	50
1B	Buck Jordan	138	555	179	.323	3	66
2B	Tony Cuccinello	150	565	174	.308	7	86
SS	Billy Urbanski	122	494	129	.261	0	26
3B	Joe Coscarart	104	367	90	.245	2	44
OF	Gene Moore	151	637	185	.290	13	67
OF	Hal Lee	152	565	143	.253	3	64
OF	Wally Berger	138	534	154	.288	25	91

==== Other batters ====
Note: G = Games played; AB = At bats; H = Hits; Avg. = Batting average; HR = Home runs; RBI = Runs batted in

Player	G	AB	H	Avg.	HR	RBI
Rabbit Warstler	74	304	64	.211	0	17
Tommy Thompson	106	266	76	.286	4	36
Mickey Haslin	36	104	29	.279	2	11
Ray Mueller	24	71	14	.197	0	5
Bill Lewis	29	62	19	.306	0	3
Pinky Whitney	10	40	7	.175	0	5
Ed Moriarty	6	6	1	.167	0	0
Fabian Kowalik	2	5	2	.400	0	1
Andy Pilney	3	2	0	.000	0	0
Swede Larsen	3	1	0	.000	0	0

=== Pitching ===
==== Starting pitchers ====
Note: G = Games pitched; IP = Innings pitched; W = Wins; L = Losses; ERA = Earned run average; SO = Strikeouts

Player	G	IP	W	L	ERA	SO
Danny MacFayden	37	266.2	17	13	2.87	86
Tiny Chaplin	40	231.2	10	15	4.12	86
Johnny Lanning	28	153.0	7	11	3.65	33
Ray Benge	21	115.0	7	9	5.79	32
Guy Bush	15	90.1	4	5	3.39	28
Fabian Kowalik	1	9.0	0	1	8.00	0
Bob Brown	2	8.1	0	2	5.40	5
Art Doll	1	8.0	0	1	3.38	2
Bill Ford	1	0.0	0	0	inf	0

==== Other pitchers ====
Note: G = Games pitched; IP = Innings pitched; W = Wins; L = Losses; ERA = Earned run average; SO = Strikeouts

Player	G	IP	W	L	ERA	SO
Bobby Reis	35	138.2	6	5	4.48	25
Bob Smith	35	136.0	6	7	3.77	36
Ben Cantwell	34	133.1	9	9	3.04	42
Roy Weir	12	57.1	4	3	2.83	29
Wayne Osborne	5	20.0	1	1	5.85	8
Amby Murray	4	11.0	0	0	4.09	2
Jim McCloskey	4	8.0	0	0	11.25	2

==== Relief pitchers ====
Note: G = Games pitched; W = Wins; L = Losses; SV = Saves; ERA = Earned run average; SO = Strikeouts

Player	G	W	L	SV	ERA	SO
Al Blanche	11	0	1	1	6.19	4
Johnny Babich	3	0	0	0	10.50	1
Ken Weafer	1	0	0	0	12.00	0
Gene Ford	1	0	0	0	4.50	0

== Farm system ==
Level	Team	League	Manager
AA	St. Paul Saints	American Association	Gabby Street
A1	Knoxville Smokies	Southern Association	Jesse Petty and Neil Caldwell
D	McKeesport Tubers	Pennsylvania State Association	Ray Ryan
