= 1935 Boston Braves season =

1935 Boston Braves
- League: National League
- Ballpark: Braves Field
- City: Boston, Massachusetts
- Record: 38–115 (.248)
- League place: 8th
- Owners: Emil Fuchs (April–August); Charles Adams (August–September)
- Managers: Bill McKechnie
- Radio: Yankee Network (Fred Hoey)

The 1935 Boston Braves season was the 65th season of the franchise. The Braves finished with the worst record in the National League and the majors, with a record of 38 wins and 115 losses.

In an attempt to make his dream come true to manage, Babe Ruth came to the Braves in February 1935. He was hired as vice president and assistant manager, and team owner Emil Fuchs promised Ruth a share of team profits.

== Offseason ==
- October 2, 1934: Bill Lewis was drafted by the Braves from the St. Louis Cardinals in the 1934 rule 5 draft.
- February 26, 1935: Babe Ruth was signed as a free agent by the Braves.

== Regular season ==
On opening day, Babe Ruth was part of all of the Braves' runs in a 4–2 win over the New York Giants. However, Ruth was only a shadow of his former self. Although he had a fairly decent season in 1934, years of high living had begun taking their toll on his conditioning. His deterioration became more pronounced in early 1935. He couldn't run, and his fielding was so terrible that three of the Braves' pitchers threatened to go on strike if Ruth was in the lineup. A month into the season, Ruth stopped hitting as well. It soon became obvious that Ruth's titles as vice president and assistant manager were mere window dressing, and that he was only on the team due to the attention he commanded. He also discovered that rather than give him a share of the Braves' profits, Fuchs expected him to invest some of his money in the team.

Seeing a team in utter collapse and realizing he was finished even as a part-time player, Ruth retired on June 1, six days after he had what remains one of the most memorable afternoons in baseball history. He clouted what turned out to be the last three home runs of his career in a game at Forbes Field while playing the Pittsburgh Pirates. He'd wanted to quit as early as May 12, but Fuchs wanted him to hang on so he could play in every National League park. Fuchs lost control of the team soon afterward.

Despite fielding essentially the same team that finished fourth a year earlier, the 1935 season quickly turned into a debacle. In fact, their Opening Day win was the only time they were over .500 all year. They won only four games in May and never recovered. By the time Ruth retired they were 10-27, 16.5 games out of first, and their season was all but finished. They ultimately won only 28 more times to finish 38–115, the worst season in franchise history. Their .248 winning percentage is tied for the seventh-worst in baseball history, and the sixth-worst in National League history. It is the second-worst in modern baseball history (behind only the 1916 Philadelphia Athletics), and the worst in modern National League history. During the season, Braves pitcher Ben Cantwell would be the last pitcher in the 20th century to lose at least 25 games in one season. The only highlight was outfielder Wally Berger, who led the League in home runs (34) and RBIs (130).

=== Season standings ===
National League
| Team | W | L | Pct. | GB | Home | Road |
|---|---|---|---|---|---|---|
| Chicago Cubs | 100 | 54 | .649 | — | 56‍–‍21 | 44‍–‍33 |
| St. Louis Cardinals | 96 | 58 | .623 | 4 | 53‍–‍24 | 43‍–‍34 |
| New York Giants | 91 | 62 | .595 | 8½ | 50‍–‍27 | 41‍–‍35 |
| Pittsburgh Pirates | 86 | 67 | .562 | 13½ | 46‍–‍31 | 40‍–‍36 |
| Brooklyn Dodgers | 70 | 83 | .458 | 29½ | 38‍–‍38 | 32‍–‍45 |
| Cincinnati Reds | 68 | 85 | .444 | 31½ | 41‍–‍35 | 27‍–‍50 |
| Philadelphia Phillies | 64 | 89 | .418 | 35½ | 35‍–‍43 | 29‍–‍46 |
| Boston Braves | 38 | 115 | .248 | 61½ | 25‍–‍50 | 13‍–‍65 |

=== Record vs. opponents ===
1935 National League record Sources:
| Team | BSN | BRO | CHC | CIN | NYG | PHI | PIT | STL |
|---|---|---|---|---|---|---|---|---|
| Boston | — | 6–16 | 3–19 | 10–12 | 5–16 | 8–14 | 2–20 | 4–18 |
| Brooklyn | 16–6 | — | 5–17 | 11–11 | 9–13 | 12–9–1 | 11–11 | 6–16 |
| Chicago | 19–3 | 17–5 | — | 14–8 | 14–8 | 13–9 | 15–7 | 8–14 |
| Cincinnati | 12–10 | 11–11 | 8–14 | — | 8–14–1 | 13–9 | 8–13 | 8–14 |
| New York | 16–5 | 13–9 | 8–14 | 14–8–1 | — | 12–10–2 | 14–8 | 14–8 |
| Philadelphia | 14–8 | 9–12–1 | 9–13 | 9–13 | 10–12–2 | — | 6–16 | 7–15 |
| Pittsburgh | 20–2 | 11–11 | 7–15 | 13–8 | 8–14 | 16–6 | — | 11–11 |
| St. Louis | 18–4 | 16–6 | 14–8 | 14–8 | 8–14 | 15–7 | 11–11 | — |

=== Notable transactions ===
- June 1, 1935: Babe Ruth announces his retirement.
- August 5, 1935: Shanty Hogan was released by the Braves.

=== Roster ===
1935 Boston Braves
Roster
| Pitchers: 28 Larry Benton; 15 Huck Betts; -- Al Blanche; 11 Ed Brandt; 12 Bob Brown; 16 Ben Cantwell; 14 Fred Frankhouse; 21 Danny MacFayden; 21 Leo Mangum; 13 Flint Rhem; 17 Bob Smith | Catchers: 30 Art Doll; 8 Shanty Hogan; 22 Bill Lewis; 22 Ray Mueller; 9 Al Spohrer; Infielders: 26 Joe Coscarart; 7 Fritz Knothe; 23 Elbie Fletcher; 5 Buck Jordan; 20 Les Mallon; 23 Rabbit Maranville; 28 Marty McManus; -- Ed Moriarty; 2 Billy Urbanski; 6 Pinky Whitney | Outfielders: 4 Wally Berger; 10 Hal Lee; 7 Randy Moore; 19 Joe Mowry; 3 Babe Ruth; 18 Tommy Thompson; 24 Johnnie Tyler | Manager: 33 Bill McKechnie; Coaches: 31 Hank Gowdy; 32 Duffy Lewis |

== Player stats ==
| = Indicates team leader |

=== Batting ===
==== Starters by position ====
Note: Pos = Position; G = Games played; AB = At bats; H = Hits; Avg. = Batting average; HR = Home runs; RBI = Runs batted in

| Pos | Player | G | AB | H | Avg. | HR | RBI |
|---|---|---|---|---|---|---|---|
| C | Al Spohrer | 92 | 260 | 63 | .242 | 1 | 16 |
| 1B | Buck Jordan | 130 | 470 | 131 | .279 | 5 | 35 |
| 2B | Les Mallon | 116 | 412 | 113 | .274 | 2 | 25 |
| 3B | Pinky Whitney | 126 | 458 | 125 | .273 | 4 | 60 |
| SS | Billy Urbanski | 132 | 514 | 118 | .230 | 4 | 30 |
| OF | Hal Lee | 112 | 422 | 128 | .303 | 0 | 39 |
| OF | Randy Moore | 125 | 407 | 112 | .275 | 4 | 42 |
| OF | Wally Berger | 150 | 589 | 174 | .295 | 34 | 130 |

==== Other batters ====
Note: G = Games played; AB = At bats; H = Hits; Avg. = Batting average; HR = Home runs; RBI = Runs batted in

| Player | G | AB | H | Avg. | HR | RBI |
|---|---|---|---|---|---|---|
| Tommy Thompson | 112 | 297 | 81 | .273 | 4 | 30 |
| Joe Coscarart | 86 | 284 | 67 | .236 | 1 | 29 |
| Shanty Hogan | 59 | 163 | 49 | .301 | 2 | 25 |
| Elbie Fletcher | 39 | 148 | 35 | .236 | 1 | 9 |
| Joe Mowry | 81 | 136 | 36 | .265 | 1 | 13 |
| Ray Mueller | 42 | 97 | 22 | .227 | 3 | 11 |
| Babe Ruth | 28 | 72 | 13 | .181 | 6 | 12 |
| Rabbit Maranville | 23 | 67 | 10 | .149 | 0 | 5 |
| Johnnie Tyler | 13 | 47 | 16 | .340 | 2 | 11 |
| Ed Moriarty | 8 | 34 | 11 | .324 | 1 | 1 |
| Art Doll | 3 | 10 | 1 | .100 | 0 | 0 |
| Bill Lewis | 6 | 4 | 0 | .000 | 0 | 0 |

=== Pitching ===
==== Starting pitchers ====
Note: G = Games pitched; IP = Innings pitched; W = Wins; L = Losses; ERA = Earned run average; SO = Strikeouts

| Player | G | IP | W | L | ERA | SO |
|---|---|---|---|---|---|---|
| Fred Frankhouse | 40 | 230.2 | 11 | 15 | 4.76 | 64 |
| Ed Brandt | 29 | 174.2 | 5 | 19 | 5.00 | 61 |
| Danny MacFayden | 28 | 151.2 | 5 | 13 | 5.10 | 46 |

==== Other pitchers ====
Note: G = Games pitched; IP = Innings pitched; W = Wins; L = Losses; ERA = Earned run average; SO = Strikeouts

| Player | G | IP | W | L | ERA | SO |
|---|---|---|---|---|---|---|
| Ben Cantwell | 39 | 210.2 | 4 | 25 | 4.61 | 34 |
| Bob Smith | 46 | 203.1 | 8 | 18 | 3.94 | 58 |
| Huck Betts | 44 | 159.2 | 2 | 9 | 5.47 | 40 |
| Bob Brown | 15 | 65.0 | 1 | 8 | 6.37 | 17 |
| Flint Rhem | 10 | 40.1 | 0 | 5 | 5.36 | 10 |

==== Relief pitchers ====
Note: G = Games pitched; W = Wins; L = Losses; SV = Saves; ERA = Earned run average; SO = Strikeouts

| Player | G | W | L | SV | ERA | SO |
|---|---|---|---|---|---|---|
| Larry Benton | 29 | 2 | 3 | 0 | 6.88 | 21 |
| Al Blanche | 6 | 0 | 0 | 0 | 1.56 | 4 |
| Leo Mangum | 3 | 0 | 0 | 0 | 3.86 | 0 |

== Farm system ==
| Level | Team | League | Manager |
|---|---|---|---|
| AA | Seattle Indians | Pacific Coast League | Dutch Ruether |
| A | Harrisburg Senators | New York–Pennsylvania League | Art Shires |
| D | McKeesport Braves | Pennsylvania State Association | Wilbur Cooper |

== See also ==
- List of worst Major League Baseball season records
