= 1913 in baseball =

The following are the baseball events of the year 1913 throughout the world.

== Champions ==
- World Series: Philadelphia Athletics over New York Giants (4–1)

== Awards and honors ==
- Chalmers Award
  - Walter Johnson, Washington Senators, P
  - Jake Daubert, Brooklyn Dodgers, 1B

== Statistical leaders ==
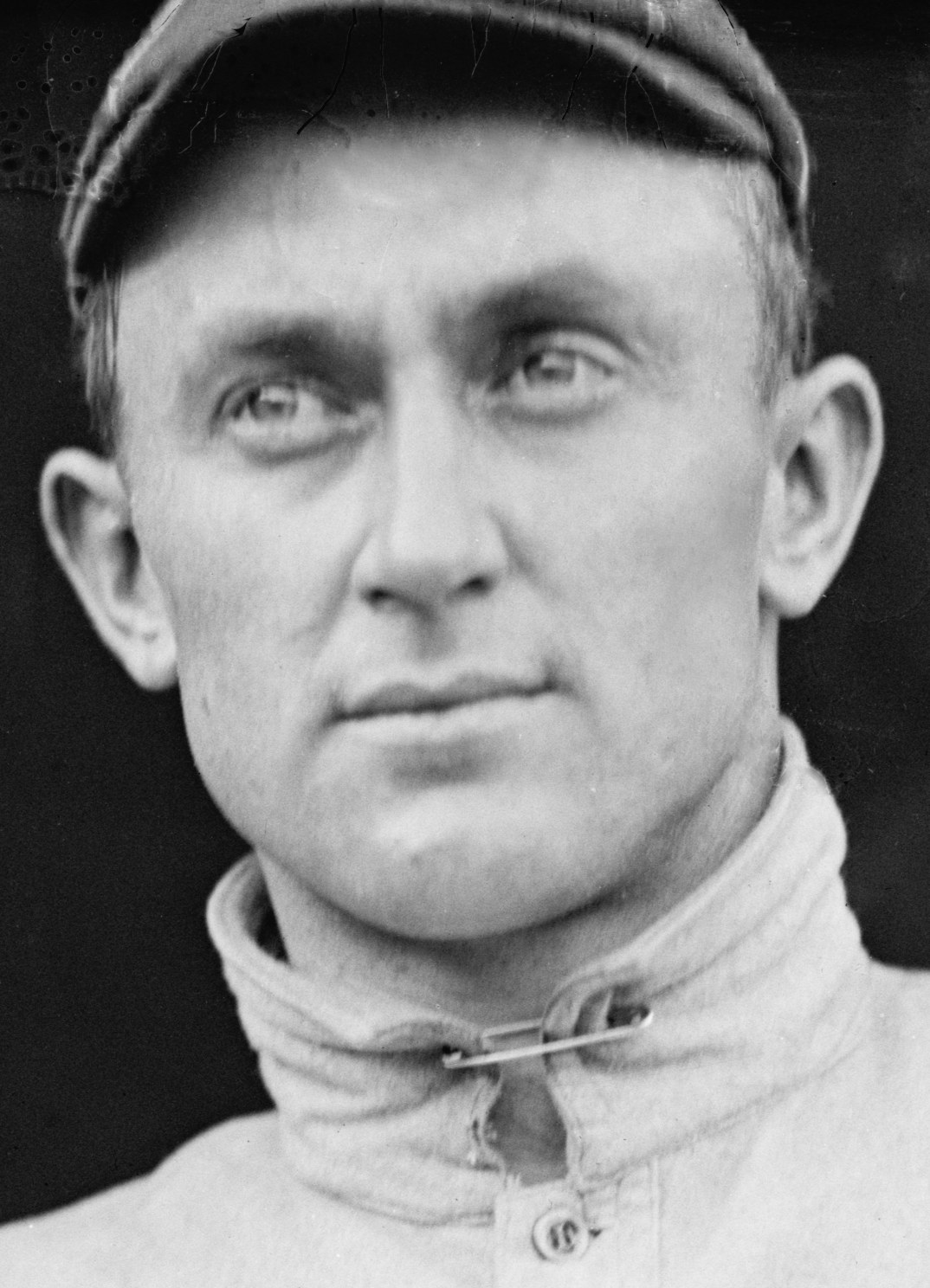
Ty Cobb in 1913

	American League		National League	
Stat	Player	Total	Player	Total
AVG	Ty Cobb (DET)	.389	Jake Daubert (BRO)	.350
HR	Home Run Baker (PHA)	12	Gavvy Cravath (PHI)	19
RBI	Home Run Baker (PHA)	117	Gavvy Cravath (PHI)	128
W	Walter Johnson^{1} (WSH)	36	Tom Seaton (PHI)	27
ERA	Walter Johnson^{1} (WSH)	1.14	Christy Mathewson (NYG)	2.06
K	Walter Johnson^{1} (WSH)	243	Tom Seaton (PHI)	168

^{1} Major league Triple Crown pitching winner

== Major league baseball final standings ==
=== American League final standings ===
American League
Team	W	L	Pct.	GB	Home	Road
Philadelphia Athletics	96	57	.627	—	50‍–‍26	46‍–‍31
Washington Senators	90	64	.584	6½	42‍–‍35	48‍–‍29
Cleveland Naps	86	66	.566	9½	45‍–‍32	41‍–‍34
Boston Red Sox	79	71	.527	15½	41‍–‍34	38‍–‍37
Chicago White Sox	78	74	.513	17½	40‍–‍37	38‍–‍37
Detroit Tigers	66	87	.431	30	34‍–‍42	32‍–‍45
New York Yankees	57	94	.377	38	27‍–‍47	30‍–‍47
St. Louis Browns	57	96	.373	39	31‍–‍46	26‍–‍50

Locations of teams for the 1913–1914 American League seasons
American League

=== National League final standings ===
National League
Team	W	L	Pct.	GB	Home	Road
New York Giants	101	51	.664	—	54‍–‍23	47‍–‍28
Philadelphia Phillies	88	63	.583	12½	43‍–‍33	45‍–‍30
Chicago Cubs	88	65	.575	13½	51‍–‍25	37‍–‍40
Pittsburgh Pirates	78	71	.523	21½	41‍–‍35	37‍–‍36
Boston Braves	69	82	.457	31½	34‍–‍40	35‍–‍42
Brooklyn Dodgers	65	84	.436	34½	29‍–‍47	36‍–‍37
Cincinnati Reds	64	89	.418	37½	32‍–‍44	32‍–‍45
St. Louis Cardinals	51	99	.340	49	25‍–‍48	26‍–‍51

Locations of teams for the 1913 National League season
National League

== Events ==
=== January ===
- January 6 – The Chicago Cubs signed Roger Bresnahan as a free agent.

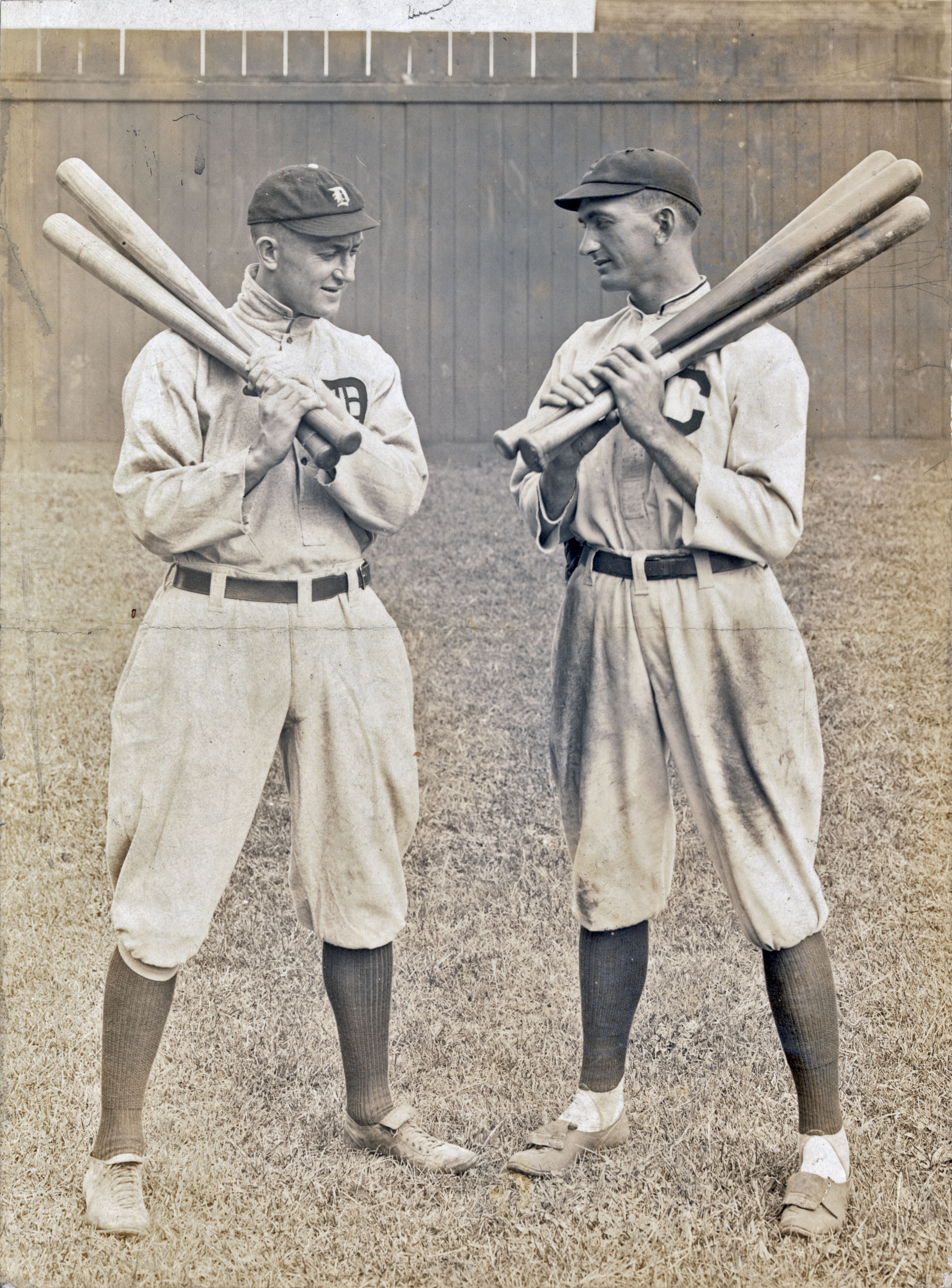
Ty Cobb and Joe Jackson

- January 8 – Frank Chance is named as the new manager of the New York Highlanders. However, Chance is never able to reproduce the success he had in Chicago as the manager of the Cubs, and he leaves New York going 117–168 during his tenure.

=== February ===
- February 17 – The Missouri Court of Appeals holds that a fan injured by a foul ball at a 1910 Kansas City Blues game was not entitled to damages from the team since he had chosen to sit in a seat unprotected by a screen when such seats were available, establishing the Baseball Rule in United States tort law.

=== March ===
- March 13 – John Powers announces plans to form a new baseball league. Powers calls the new league the Federal League. He announces the league office would be located in Indianapolis, and would include teams in Chicago, Pittsburgh, Cincinnati, Cleveland, and St. Louis, as well as a team that would be placed in the city where the league would be based.

=== April ===
- April 9 – Ebbets Field opens.
- April 29 – The Cincinnati Reds take the field wearing the uniforms of the Chicago White Sox. The Reds were facing the Chicago Cubs and had forgotten the team uniforms in Cincinnati.

=== May ===
- May 25 – The New York Yankees acquire Roger Peckinpaugh from the Cleveland Naps in exchange for outfielder Jack Lelivelt and infielder Bill Stumpf.
- May 30 – Harry Hooper of the Boston Red Sox becomes the first player to hit a home run as the lead-off hitter in both games of a doubleheader, against the Washington Senators.

=== June ===
- June 14 – Ray Schalk hits his first career home run, off of Walter "Big Train" Johnson.

=== August ===
- August 6 – The Brooklyn Dodgers purchased the contract of pitcher Jeff Pfeffer from Grand Rapids of the Central League.
- August 12 – The Cleveland Naps purchased the contract of Billy Southworth from Portsmouth of the Ohio League.
- August 18 – The Boston Braves purchased the contract of outfielder Guy Zinn from the Rochester Red Wings of the International League.

=== October ===
- October 4 – Against the Boston Red Sox, the Washington Senators use eight pitchers including infielder Germany Schaefer, catcher Eddie Ainsmith, outfielder Joe Gedeon and manager Clark Griffith. Despite the use of these non-pitchers, the Senators win the game 10–9.
- October 11 – The Philadelphia Athletics defeat the New York Giants, 3–1, in Game 5 of the World Series to win the World Championship, four games to one. The Giants thus become the second club, following the Detroit Tigers of 1907–1909, to lose three consecutive World Series; and, to date, the last to do so.

=== November ===
- November 2 – George Stovall, former St. Louis Browns player-manager, became the first Major Leaguer to jump to the outlaw Federal League after signing a contract to manage the Kansas City Packers.

=== December ===
- December 3 – Upset that the Brooklyn Dodgers will not give him a raise, Joe Tinker makes the jump to the Federal League. Tinker is named player/manager of the Chicago Whales for $12,000 in salary.

== Births ==
=== January ===
- January 7 – Johnny Mize
- January 19 – Andy Pilney
- January 20 – Jimmy Outlaw
- January 21 – Fern Bell
- January 27 – Stew Hofferth
- January 27 – Floyd Speer
- January 28 – Joe Kohlman

=== February ===
- February 6 – Ken Weafer
- February 7 – Mel Almada
- February 9 – Tony Robello
- February 10 – Bill Adair
- February 11 – Jim Hayes
- February 13 – Hack Miller
- February 14 – Mel Allen
- February 20 – Tommy Henrich

=== March ===
- March 2 – Mort Cooper
- March 4 – Bill Hart
- March 16 – Ken O'Dea
- March 21 – Bucky Jacobs
- March 22 – Hank Steinbacher
- March 25 – Buster Maynard
- March 26 – Bill Zuber

=== April ===
- April 1 – Buster Bray
- April 10 – Lloyd Russell
- April 14 – Jack Radtke
- April 21 – Bert Hogg
- April 24 – Herb Harris
- April 25 – Woody Davis
- April 26 – Packy Rogers

=== May ===
- May 7 – Art Doll
- May 10 – Al Rubeling
- May 14 – Johnny Babich
- May 14 – Howie Gorman
- May 20 – Lou Scoffic
- May 22 – Bill Lohrman
- May 24 – Joe Abreu
- May 27 – Hal Spindel

=== June ===
- June 3 – Jim Sheehan
- June 4 – Joe Holden
- June 4 – Amby Murray
- June 8 – Art Mahan
- June 8 – Earl Reid
- June 10 – Cal Dorsett
- June 11 – Tom Baker
- June 13 – Hal Luby
- June 16 – Pete Coscarart
- June 16 – Skeeter Scalzi
- June 23 – Bill Cox
- June 26 – Russ Lyon

=== July ===
- July 1 – Frank Barrett
- July 1 – Wedo Martini
- July 12 – Tom Hafey
- July 13 – Lee Handley
- July 14 – Don Hendrickson
- July 14 – Gene Schott
- July 17 – Fred Williams
- July 31 – Bill Fleming
- July 31 – Joe Mulligan

=== August ===
- August 5 – Fabian Gaffke
- August 8 – Cecil Travis
- August 9 – Jack Tighe
- August 11 – Bob Scheffing
- August 13 – Wes Flowers
- August 16 – Tiny Bonham
- August 16 – Lew Carpenter
- August 17 – Rudy York
- August 18 – Tommy Heath
- August 20 – Eddie Popowski
- August 25 – Sam Narron
- August 25 – Bernie Snyder
- August 26 – Hank Helf
- August 31 – Mays Copeland
- August 31 – Ray Dandridge

=== September ===
- September 1 – Joe Marty
- September 3 – Kerby Farrell
- September 4 – Clarence Fieber
- September 8 – Slick Castleman
- September 9 – Hugh Mulcahy
- September 13 – Booker McDaniels
- September 13 – Roy Zimmerman
- September 17 – Bob Uhl
- September 18 – Max Marshall
- September 19 – Nick Etten
- September 23 – Pete Sivess
- September 30 – Nate Andrews

=== October ===
- October 3 – Dom Dallessandro
- October 6 – Ken Chase
- October 8 – Lee Rogers
- October 11 – Silvio García
- October 14 – Hugh Casey
- October 18 – Roy Cullenbine
- October 19 – Al Brazle
- October 21 – Mark Christman
- October 25 – Herb Bremer
- October 25 – Gene Corbett
- October 25 – Phil Marchildon
- October 30 – Dave Barnhill
- October 30 – John Burrows
- October 31 – Warren Huston

=== November ===
- November 4 – Joe Kracher
- November 12 – Gene Lillard
- November 15 – Lyle Judy
- November 15 – Swede Larsen
- November 17 – Lee Stine
- November 18 – Charlie Fuchs
- November 23 – Les Scarsella
- November 24 – Walter Wilson
- November 26 – Garton Del Savio
- November 30 – Wally Holborow

=== December ===
- December 2 – Glenn Crawford
- December 6 – Bill Kerksieck
- December 12 – Bill Webb
- December 13 – Scat Metha
- December 14 – Eddie Smith
- December 21 – Heinie Heltzel
- December 24 – George Jeffcoat
- December 24 – Owen Scheetz
- December 26 – Al Milnar
- December 27 – Red Lynn

== Deaths ==
=== January–March ===
- January 6 – Jack Boyle, 46, catcher/first baseman who hit .253 with 23 home runs and 570 RBI for five different teams in three leagues from 1886 to 1898.
- January 9 – George Crosby, 55, pitcher for the 1884 Chicago White Stockings of the National League.
- January 14 – Hal O'Hagan, 43, first baseman for the 1892 Chicago Orphans and for the New York Giants, Cleveland Bronchos, and Washington Senators in the 1902 season.
- January 15 – Icicle Reeder, 55, outfielder who played in 1884 with the AA Cincinnati Red Stockings and the UA Washington Nationals.
- January 16 – Tom Dolan, 58, catcher who hit .242 for five teams in three leagues between 1879 and 1888.
- February 5 – George Frazier, 52, owner and manager of the 1890 Syracuse Stars of the then-major-league American Association.
- February 9 – Joe Stewart, 33, pitcher for the Boston Beaneaters of the National League.
- February 26 – Mike Drissel, 48, catcher in six games for the St. Louis Browns 1885 American Association champions.
- March 3 – Jack Fee, 45, pitcher for the 1889 Indianapolis Hoosiers of the National League.
- March 28 – Clare Patterson, 25, left fielder for the 1909 Cincinnati Reds of the National League.

=== April–June ===
- April 16 – Jerry Harrington, 45, National League catcher who hit .227 in 189 games with the Cincinnati Reds (1890–1892) and Louisville Colonels (1893).
- April 18 – Roscoe Miller, 36, pitcher for the Detroit Tigers (1901–1902), New York Giants (1902–1903) and Pittsburgh Pirates (1904), who became the first 20-game winner in Tigers history.
- April 23 – Charlie Pabor, 66, player-manager for four teams of the National Association from 1871 through 1875.
- May 1 – Charlie Reynolds, 55, pitcher for the 1882 Philadelphia Athletics of the American Association.
- May 13 – John O'Brien, 46, Canadian second baseman who hit .256 in 501 games for six National League teams from 1891 to 1899.
- May 14 – Dennis Coughlin, 69, outfielder for the 1872 Washington Nationals of the National Association; best remembered as the only major leaguer who was wounded in combat during the Civil War.
- May 18 – The Only Nolan, 55, pitcher who posted a 23–52 record and a 2.98 ERA in 79 games with four teams between 1878 and 1875.
- May 18 – Charlie Robinson, 56, American Association catcher who played for the Indianapolis Hoosiers (1884) and Brooklyn Grays (1885).
- June 5 – Chris von der Ahe, 61, owner of the St. Louis Browns from 1882 to 1898, who greatly developed the entertainment aspect of the sport with fan-friendly promotions and ballpark attractions, and also presided over first team to win four straight pennants (1885–1888).
- June 13 – Eddie Quick, 31, pitcher for the 1903 New York Highlanders of the American League.
- June 30 – George Tidden, 56, sports editor in New York since 1895.

=== July–September ===
- July 13 – Dan Sweeney, 45, outfielder for the 1895 Louisville Colonels of the National League.
- July 17 – Pat Scanlon, Canadian outfielder who played in 1884 with the Boston Reds of the Union Association.
- July 19 – Jiggs Donahue, 34, a standout at first base in the early years of the American League, and a key member of the 1906 White Sox that won their cross-town rival Cubs in the only all-Chicago World Series ever played.
- July 28 – John Greenig, 65, pitcher for the 1888 Washington Nationals of the National League.
- August 8 – John Gaffney, 58, the sport's first great umpire, officiating for twelve seasons in three leagues between 1884 and 1900; managed Washington team in 1886–1887, and officiated in 1887–1888–1889 championship series, pioneering use of multiple umpires in games.
- August 14 – Chummy Gray, 40, pitcher who posted a 3–3 record and a 3.44 ERA for the Pittsburgh Pirates in 1899.
- August 14 – William H. Locke, 43, co-owner of the Philadelphia Phillies from January 1913 until his death seven months later.
- August 25 – Red Donahue, 40, pitcher who won 20 games three times with the Phillies and Browns and led the National League in complete games (1897), while collecting 164 career wins and a no-hitter (1898).
- September 3 – Charlie Householder, 59, first baseman/catcher who played in two Major League seasons, 1882 and 1884.
- September 15 – Frank Hough, 56, sports editor in Philadelphia who helped organize the Athletics American League franchise in 1901
- September 24 – Fred Roat, 45, National League third baseman for the Pittsburgh Alleghenys (1890) and Chicago Colts (1892).

=== October–December ===
- October 8 – Elmer Cleveland, 51, third baseman who hit .255 in 80 games with four clubs in three different leagues between 1884 and 1891.
- October 13 – Mike Heydon, 39, catcher who played from 1898 through 1907 for the Senators, Cardinals, White Sox and Orioles.
- October 24 – Dan Shannon, 48, player and manager during his three-year career with the Colonels/Giants/Statesmen/Athletics from 1889 to 1891.
- November 8 – Ferdinand Abell, 80, co-founder and co-owner of the Brooklyn Dodgers franchise from 1883 to 1907.
- November 15 – Monte McFarland, 41, pitcher who played for the National League Chicago Colts in 1895 and 1896.
- December 24 – Chief Sockalexis, 42, right fielder for the 1897–1899 Cleveland Spiders, who was the first Native American to play in the major leagues.
- December 26 – Frank O'Connor, 46, pitcher for the 1893 Philadelphia Phillies.
- December 30 – Joe Neale, 47, American Association pitcher for the St. Louis Browns (1886–1887) and Louisville Colonels (1890–1891).
