= 1997 in baseball =

The following are the baseball events of the year 1997 throughout the world.

== Champions ==
=== Major League Baseball ===
- World Series: Florida Marlins over Cleveland Indians (4-3); Liván Hernández, MVP

Division Series (ALDS, NLDS)
Central	Cleveland	3
WC	NY Yankees	2
American League
East	Baltimore	3
West	Seattle	1
East	Atlanta	3
Central	Houston	0
National League
West	San Francisco	0
WC	Florida	3

League Championship Series (ALCS, NLCS)
Central	Cleveland	4
East	Baltimore	2
East	Atlanta	2
WC	Florida	4

World Series
AL	Cleveland	3
NL	Florida	4

- American League Championship Series MVP: Marquis Grissom
  - American League Division Series
- National League Championship Series MVP: Liván Hernández
  - National League Division Series
- All-Star Game, July 8 at Jacobs Field: American League, 3-1; Sandy Alomar Jr., MVP

=== Other champions ===
- Caribbean World Series: Aguilas Cibaeñas (Dominican Republic)
- College World Series: LSU
- Cuban National Series: Pinar del Río over Villa Clara
- Japan Series: Yakult Swallows over Seibu Lions (4-1)
- Korean Series: Haitai Tigers over LG Twins
- Big League World Series: Broward County, Florida
- Junior League World Series: Salem, New Hampshire
- Little League World Series: Linda Vista, Guadalupe, Mexico
- Senior League World Series: San Francisco, Venezuela
- Taiwan Series: Uni-President Lions over China Times Eagles
- Central American Games: Panama

== Awards and honors ==
- Baseball Hall of Fame
  - Nellie Fox
  - Tommy Lasorda
  - Phil Niekro
  - Willie Wells
- Most Valuable Player
  - Ken Griffey Jr., Seattle Mariners, OF (AL)
  - Larry Walker, Colorado Rockies, OF (NL)
- Cy Young Award
  - Roger Clemens, Toronto Blue Jays (AL)
  - Pedro Martínez, Montreal Expos (NL)
- Rookie of the Year
  - Nomar Garciaparra, Boston Red Sox, SS (AL)
  - Scott Rolen, Philadelphia Phillies, 3B (NL)
- Manager of the Year Award
  - Davey Johnson, Baltimore Orioles (AL)
  - Dusty Baker, San Francisco Giants (NL)
- Woman Executive of the Year (major or minor league): Dot Cloud, Nashville Sounds, American Association
- Gold Glove Award
  - Rafael Palmeiro (1B) (AL)
  - Chuck Knoblauch (2B) (AL)
  - Matt Williams (3B) (AL)
  - Omar Vizquel (SS) (AL)
  - Jim Edmonds (OF) (AL)
  - Ken Griffey Jr. (OF) (AL)
  - Bernie Williams (OF) (AL)
  - Iván Rodríguez (C) (AL)
  - Mike Mussina (P) (AL)
  - J. T. Snow (1B) (NL)
  - Craig Biggio (2B) (NL)
  - Ken Caminiti (3B) (NL)
  - Rey Ordóñez (SS) (NL)
  - Barry Bonds (OF) (NL)
  - Raúl Mondesí (OF) (NL)
  - Larry Walker (OF) (NL)
  - Charles Johnson (C) (NL)
  - Greg Maddux (P) (NL)

== MLB statistical leaders ==
	American League		National League
Type	Name	Stat	Name	Stat
AVG	Frank Thomas CWS	.347	Tony Gwynn SD	.372
HR	Ken Griffey Jr. SEA	56	Larry Walker COL	49
RBI	Ken Griffey Jr. SEA	147	Andrés Galarraga COL	140
Wins	Roger Clemens TOR	21	Denny Neagle ATL	20
ERA	Roger Clemens TOR	2.05	Pedro Martínez MON	1.90

== Major League Baseball final standings ==
American League
Rank	Club	Wins	Losses	Win %	GB
East Division
1st	Baltimore Orioles	98	64	.605	--
2nd	New York Yankees *	96	66	.593	2.0
3rd	Detroit Tigers	79	83	.488	19.0
4th	Boston Red Sox	78	84	.481	20.0
5th	Toronto Blue Jays	76	86	.469	22.0
Central Division
1st	Cleveland Indians	86	75	.534	--
2nd	Chicago White Sox	80	81	.497	6.0
3rd	Milwaukee Brewers	78	83	.484	8.0
4th	Minnesota Twins	68	94	.420	18.5
5th	Kansas City Royals	67	94	.416	19.0
West Division
1st	Seattle Mariners	90	72	.556	--
2nd	Anaheim Angels	84	78	.519	6.0
3rd	Texas Rangers	77	85	.475	13.0
4th	Oakland Athletics	65	97	.401	25.0

National League
Rank	Club	Wins	Losses	Win %	GB
East Division
1st	Atlanta Braves	101	61	.623	--
2nd	Florida Marlins *	92	70	.568	9.0
3rd	New York Mets	88	74	.543	13.0
4th	Montreal Expos	78	84	.481	23.0
5th	Philadelphia Phillies	68	94	.420	33.0
Central Division
1st	Houston Astros	84	78	.519	--
2nd	Pittsburgh Pirates	79	83	.488	5.0
3rd	Cincinnati Reds	76	86	.469	8.0
4th	St. Louis Cardinals	73	89	.451	11.0
5th	Chicago Cubs	68	94	.420	16.0
West Division
1st	San Francisco Giants	90	72	.556	--
2nd	Los Angeles Dodgers	88	74	.543	2.0
3rd	Colorado Rockies	83	79	.512	7.0
4th	San Diego Padres	76	86	.469	14.0

- The asterisk denotes the club that won the wild card for its respective league.

== Events ==
=== January–March ===
- January 5 – Boston Red Sox pitcher Tim Wakefield escapes serious injury when he is hit by a car while out jogging. He is released from the hospital after being treated for bruises.
- January 6 – Pitcher Phil Niekro is elected to the Hall of Fame by the Baseball Writers' Association of America. Niekro receives 80.34% of the vote. Pitcher Don Sutton falls nine votes short of election.
- January 8 – The San Diego Padres sign pitcher Fernando Valenzuela as a free agent.
- January 9 – The Detroit Tigers sign Vince Coleman as a free agent. Coleman appears in just six games, getting one hit in fifteen plate appearances before announcing his retirement mid-season.
- January 13 – The San Diego Padres purchased the contract of Hideki Irabu from Chiba Lotte of the Japan Pacific League.
- January 27 – Jose Canseco returns to the Oakland A's after he's traded there by the Boston Red Sox in exchange for pitcher John Wasdin and cash considerations.
- February 7 - The Chicago White Sox sign pitcher Danny Darwin as a free agent.
- February 17 – Deion Sanders returns to baseball after signing a free agent contract with the Cincinnati Reds.
- February 20 – The Philadelphia Phillies sign free agent outfielder Danny Tartabull. Tartabull will break his foot on Opening Day and sit out the year before retiring.
- March 5 – Nellie Fox, Tommy Lasorda and Negro leaguer Willie Wells are elected to the Hall of Fame by the Veterans Committee.
- March 20 - The Atlanta Braves signed Hensley Meulens, who was attempted to return to the majors after spending the previous two seasons in Japan.
- March 26 – Todd Van Poppel, who had one time been one of baseball's top prospects, is released by the Anaheim Angels. Van Poppel would spend the entire 1997 season out of organized baseball.
  - Bob Hamelin, who just a few seasons prior, had been rookie of the year, was released by the Kansas City Royals.
- March 31 - Jim Abbott is released by the Anaheim Angels.

=== April–May ===
- April 4 – Bartolo Colón makes his major league debut starting for the Cleveland Indians. Colon gives up six hits in five innings as Cleveland lost to Anaheim 8-6. Colon would go on to pitch 21 years in the major leagues.
- April 5 – Larry Walker hits 3 home runs helping the Colorado Rockies beat Montreal Expos 15–3.
- April 10 – At Wrigley Field, Alex Fernandez of the Florida Marlins has a no-hitter broken up in the ninth inning of a 1-0 victory over the Chicago Cubs. With one out in the inning, Dave Hansen hits a ground ball that goes under Fernandez's glove and off his right leg. Brian McRae and Brant Brown then reach on errors, but José Hernández, pinch-running for Hansen, is thrown out on the latter play. Hernández then strikes out Ryne Sandberg for the final out. The no-hitter would have been the first against the Cubs since Sandy Koufax's perfect game in 1965. The loss also extends the Cubs' season-opening losing streak to eight games, the most to start a season in the franchise's 122-year history; they will extend the losing streak to 14 games before finally winning their first game on April 20 against the New York Mets.
- April 11 – To commemorate the 50th anniversary of the baseball color line, Sharon Robinson, Jackie Robinson's daughter, and Pumpsie Green each throw out the ceremonial first pitch at Fenway Park. In 1959, Green became the first African-American baseball player to appear in a Boston Red Sox uniform, making the Red Sox the last team to integrate in the major leagues.
- April 15 – On the fiftieth anniversary of Jackie Robinson's first game, all Major League baseball games are stopped so that fans across the country may witness a special presentation at Shea Stadium. With then U.S. President Bill Clinton alongside, acting Commissioner Bud Selig announces that Robinson's uniform #42 will be retired from all Major League teams in perpetuity, with exceptions made for players currently wearing #42 in honor of Robinson.
- April 25 – Ken Griffey Jr. hits three home runs helping the Seattle Mariners beat the Toronto Blue Jays, 13–8.
- April 29 – Chili Davis' 300th home run, leading off the 10th inning, snaps a 5–5 tie and gives the Kansas City Royals a 6–5 win over the Toronto Blue Jays.
- May 1 - The Boston Red Sox sell the contract of pitcher Johnny Ruffin to the Kintetsu Buffaloes.
- May 7 – The Montreal Expos score a National League-record 13 runs in the sixth inning of their game against the San Francisco Giants on the way to a 19–3 win. The Expos send 17 batters to the plate. Mike Lansing homers twice in the inning to drive in five runs, becoming the third Expos player to perform the feat, and the first NL second baseman to do so since Bobby Lowe in 1894.
- May 8 – At home, the Baltimore Orioles stop Randy Johnson's 16-game win streak with a decisive 13–3 pasting of the Seattle Mariners. Baltimore is led by catcher Chris Hoiles, who collects six RBI on two homers and a double. Johnson strikes out 10 in six innings, but gives up five runs on six hits and two walks in his attempt to become the first AL pitcher since Dave McNally (1968–69) to win 17 straight.
- May 13 – Eddie Murray gets two hits in Anaheim's 8–7 win over the Chicago White Sox. The game is the 3,000th of Murray's career, making him only the sixth player in history to reach that mark, joining Pete Rose, Carl Yastrzemski, Hank Aaron, Ty Cobb and Stan Musial.
- May 21 – Roger Clemens fires the Toronto Blue Jays past the New York Yankees 4–1, for his 8th win of the year against no losses. The Rocket wins his 200th game, the 94th pitcher to reach the 200 victories mark.
- May 25 – The Minnesota Twins retire Kirby Puckett's uniform number 34 in a 90-minute pregame ceremony.
- May 26:
  - In the Chicago Cubs' 2–1 win over the Pittsburgh Pirates, Cub Sammy Sosa and Pirate Tony Womack both hit inside-the-park home runs in the sixth inning. It is the first time two inside-the-park homers are hit in the same National League game since Lou Brock and Héctor Cruz of the St. Louis Cardinals did it against the San Diego Padres on June 18, 1976. Greg Gagne of the Twins had two for Minnesota on October 4, 1986.
  - In Toronto, Roger Clemens allows one run and four hits in seven innings and strikes out seven to beat the Texas Rangers 8–1. The Rocket is now 9–0, his best start since beginning 1986 at 14–0.
  - Andrés Galarraga hits a 469-foot two-run homer and Vinny Castilla adds a solo shot as the Colorado Rockies overcome a six-run deficit to beat the St. Louis Cardinals, 9–7. Galarraga has four RBI, and his moon shot off Mark Petkovsek is the third-longest homer in the three-season history of Coors Field.
- May 27 – Barry Larkin's streak of consecutively reaching base 13 times is stopped by Curt Schilling, who goes all the way to beat Cincinnati 2–1. Larkin singles in the first inning, but flies out in the 3rd to end his streak one shy of Pedro Guerrero's NL record, set in 1985.
- May 30 – Baltimore Orioles pitcher Mike Mussina retires the first 25 Cleveland Indians batters before Sandy Alomar Jr. ruins his no-hit bid with a one-out single in the ninth inning. Mussina then strikes out the final two batters for a 3–0 victory.
- May 31:
  - Cal Ripken Jr. snaps a seventh-inning tie with a record-breaking home run as the Baltimore Orioles rally from a four-run deficit to beat the Cleveland Indians, 8–5. Ripken's homer gives him 4,274 total bases with Baltimore, breaking the franchise mark for total bases in a career. Baltimore also places Eric Davis on the disabled list. Davis is suffering from colon cancer and will be operated on in early June.
  - In Miami, Andrés Galarraga hits a 529-foot grand slam, the longest home run ever at Pro Player Stadium. His homer gives the Colorado Rockies a 7–0 lead over the Florida Marlins, and they eventually win 8–4. Galarraga has three home runs in the past three games against Florida that traveled 1,435 feet, an average of 478 feet. He hit a 455-foot homer two days before and a 451-foot homer on May 30. The longest previous homer at the stadium was 482 feet by Philadelphia Phillies' Pete Incaviglia off Al Leiter on May 1, 1996.
  - Unbeaten Roger Clemens is the first 10-game winner in the majors, as the Toronto Blue Jays romp 13–3 over the Oakland Athletics.

=== June–July ===
- June 3 - The Florida Marlins use their first round pick to select pitcher Cliff Lee. However, Lee opts not to sign with Florida.
- June 7 – Switch-hitter Chili Davis strokes home runs from both sides of the plate for the eleventh time in his career, to become the leader in this category. He passes Mickey Mantle and Eddie Murray, who each accomplished the feat ten times in their careers. Nick Swisher, Mark Teixeira and Carlos Beltrán will subsequently pass Davis on the list.
- June 10 – At 3Com Park at Candlestick Point, Kevin Brown of the Florida Marlins no-hits the San Francisco Giants 9-0. He retires 23 consecutive batters before a hit-by-pitch to Marvin Benard costs him a perfect game, the only baserunner Brown will allow.
- June 12 – The first interleague game took place as the Texas Rangers hosted the San Francisco Giants at The Ballpark in Arlington (now Choctaw Stadium). The Giants won 4-3.
- June 24 – At the Kingdome, Randy Johnson of the Seattle Mariners strikes out 19 Oakland Athletics to tie Steve Carlton's 28-year record for most in one game by a left-handed pitcher, but loses 4-1. One of the Athletics runs comes on a towering home run by Mark McGwire, Johnson's ex-University of Southern California teammate.
- June 28 – New York Yankees pitcher David Wells takes the mound wearing an authentic 1934 Babe Ruth cap he'd purchased for $35,000. Following a scoreless first, Manager Joe Torre makes Wells take it off because it didn't conform to uniform standards. Wells then blew a 3–0 lead, and leaves the game after three innings, having given up five earned runs. He gets a no-decision in the Cleveland Indians' 12–8 victory at Yankee Stadium.
- June 30 – The Toronto Blue Jays host the Montreal Expos in the first game in major league baseball history between Canadian teams. The Expos won 2-1.
- July 8 – The American League defeats the National League by a score of 3-1 in the annual All-Star Game, played at Jacobs Field. Cleveland Indians catcher Sandy Alomar Jr. hits a 2-run home run and is named the game's MVP. Alomar is the first hometown player to homer since Hank Aaron did it in Atlanta–Fulton County Stadium in 1972.
- July 12 – At a sold out Three Rivers Stadium, Francisco Córdova pitched nine innings of a combined 10-inning no-hitter for the Pittsburgh Pirates. Ricardo Rincón pitched the 10th inning. The Pirates won the game on a dramatic three run, pinch hit home run in the bottom of the 10th by Mark Smith.
- July 31 – Mark McGwire is traded by the Oakland Athletics to the St. Louis Cardinals for Eric Ludwick, T.J. Mathews, and Blake Stein.

=== August–September ===
- August 8 – For the second time this season, Randy Johnson of the Seattle Mariners records a 19-strikeout performance at the Kingdome, this time against the Chicago White Sox. Unlike his 19-K performance on June 24, Johnson comes out on top, shutting out the White Sox 5-0.
- August 24 – Sammy Sosa hits his 200th career home run helping the Chicago Cubs beat the Montreal Expos 12-3.
- August 31 – Don Mattingly has his number 23 retired by the New York Yankees.
- September 5 – At 3Com Park, Barry Bonds of the San Francisco Giants becomes a five-time member of the 30–30 club. Batting in the sixth inning of the Giants' 4-1 victory over the Houston Astros, Bonds, who has 32 home runs to this point, reaches first base on pitcher Shane Reynolds' error, then steals second, his 30th stolen base of the season, on a Jeff Kent strikeout. With this steal, Bonds ties his father Bobby for most seasons with both 30 home runs and 30 stolen bases.
- September 10 – Mark McGwire joins Babe Ruth as the only players in major league history with 50 home runs in consecutive seasons by hitting a 446-foot shot off Shawn Estes in the third inning of the St. Louis Cardinals' road game against the San Francisco Giants. McGwire, who hit a major league-leading 52 homers for the Oakland Athletics last season, becomes the first player with back-to-back 50-homer seasons since Ruth did it in 1927 and 1928.
- September 19 – Mark McGwire records his 20th home run of the season with the St. Louis Cardinals. Paired with the 34 home runs he had hit with the Oakland Athletics earlier in the year, he becomes the first player in Major League history to record twenty or more home runs for two different teams in the same season.
- September 21:
  - Mike Piazza becomes the first Dodger in history to hit a home run completely out of Dodger Stadium. Willie Stargell of the Pittsburgh Pirates was the only previous player to accomplish this feat.
  - After going 2-for-3, Ryne Sandberg is lifted for a pinch runner in the fifth inning of an 11-3 win by the Chicago Cubs over Curt Schilling and his Philadelphia Phillies. It is Sandberg's final Major League game.
- September 22 – At Cinergy Field, Jeff Bagwell of the Houston Astros becomes the first full-time first baseman to join the 30–30 club. After doubling off the Cincinnati Reds' Mike Remlinger to score Craig Biggio in the first inning, Bagwell, who has 42 home runs at this point, steals third base for his 30th steal of the season. He will steal another base in the game, which the Astros win 6-3. Bagwell will also join the 30–30 club in 1999.
- September 23 – The Florida Marlins clinch the National League wild card. It is the franchise's first-ever post-season appearance.
- September 25 – Pedro Martínez records his 300th strikeout of the season, becoming the first player since 1972 (Steve Carlton) to record 300 or more strikeouts while maintaining a sub-2.00 ERA.
- September 28 – Tony Gwynn of the San Diego Padres ties Honus Wagner's record by winning his eighth National League batting title. Gwynn finishes at .372, becoming the first player to win four consecutive NL batting titles since Rogers Hornsby won six straight between 1920 and 1925.
- September 30 – Tim Raines, Derek Jeter, and Paul O'Neill become the first trio to hit back-to-back-to-back home runs in a single postseason game as their New York Yankees defeat the Cleveland Indians, 8-6, in the first game of the 1997 American League Division Series.

=== October–December ===
- October 11 – Mike Mussina sets record for most strikeouts in a postseason game for the losing team (15) as the Baltimore Orioles lose to the Cleveland Indians 2-1.
- October 14 – The Florida Marlins become the fastest expansion team to reach the World Series with a 7-4 win over the Atlanta Braves in Game 6 of the National League Championship Series.
- October 15 – The Cleveland Indians defeat the Baltimore Orioles 1-0 in 11 innings in Game 6 of the American League Championship Series to reach their 2nd World Series in 3 seasons.
- October 26 – The Florida Marlins defeat the Cleveland Indians in Game 7 to win the World Series in just their 5th season of existence.
- October 27 – The Detroit Tigers break ground on their new ballpark.
- November 6 – The Milwaukee Brewers switch leagues, joining the National League Central Division, after the Kansas City Royals reject the invitation. With the 1998 addition of the Arizona Diamondbacks (NL) and Tampa Bay Devil Rays (AL), the move will maintain an even number of teams in each league.
- November 12 – Ken Griffey Jr. of the Seattle Mariners becomes the ninth unanimous pick for the American League MVP Award. Griffey hit .304 for Seattle, led the AL with 56 home runs, and led the Majors with 147 RBI. He receives all 28 first-place votes and 392 points in balloting to become the first unanimous AL pick since Frank Thomas in 1993, and the 13th unanimous selection overall.
- November 18 – The expansion draft starts with several transactions. Two pitchers who appeared in the World Series a month earlier, Tony Saunders (Florida Marlins) and Brian Anderson (Cleveland Indians), are the first players taken. Saunders, the first player chosen overall, heads a list of new Tampa Bay Devil Rays team members that includes Quinton McCracken, Bubba Trammell, Albie López and Terrell Wade. Tampa Bay also obtains John Flaherty from the San Diego Padres in exchange for Brian Boehringer and Andy Sheets; Kevin Stocker from the Philadelphia Phillies for Bobby Abreu; Fred McGriff from the Atlanta Braves in exchange for a player to be named, and signs free agent Roberto Hernández. The Arizona Diamondbacks, meanwhile, who signed free agent Jay Bell to a five-year contract the day before, selects Jeff Suppan, Jorge Fábregas and Karim García, and acquire Travis Fryman from the Detroit Tigers in exchange for Joe Randa, Gabe Alvarez and a minor leaguer. They also obtain Devon White from the Florida Marlins for a prospect.

== Movies ==
- Joe Torre: Curveballs Along the Way (TV)

== Births ==
=== January ===
- January 4 – Clayton Andrews
- January 4 – Davis Martin
- January 7 – Ozzie Albies
- January 8 – Nic Enright
- January 10 – Nick Sandlin
- January 14 – Pedro Ávila
- January 15 – Daz Cameron
- January 16 – Brendan Donovan
- January 16 – T. J. Hopkins
- January 16 – Thaddeus Ward
- January 17 – Alec Gamboa
- January 17 – Kyle Tucker
- January 20 – Ali Sánchez
- January 23 – Daniel Schneemann
- January 24 – Carlos Sanabria
- January 27 – Jon Heasley
- January 27 – David Villar
- January 28 – Ke'Bryan Hayes
- January 28 – John Rooney

=== February ===
- February 5 – Grant Koch
- February 7 – Ty Adcock
- February 11 – Austin Kitchen
- February 13 – Ángel De Jesús
- February 14 – Ryan McKenna
- February 14 – Ethan Small
- February 15 – Meibrys Viloria
- February 18 – Jake Irvin
- February 18 – Nick Maton
- February 18 – Ryan Mountcastle
- February 22 – José Espada
- February 24 – José Herrera
- February 25 – Josh Stowers
- February 26 – Peyton Burdick
- February 26 – Trevor Larnach
- February 26 – Luis Rengifo
- February 27 – Alexander Wells

=== March ===
- March 2 – Junior Fernández
- March 3 – Kyle Isbel
- March 3 – Humberto Mejía
- March 5 – Nick Madrigal
- March 10 – Luken Baker
- March 10 – Yariel Rodríguez
- March 11 – Carlos Hernández
- March 14 – Brandon Lockridge
- March 18 – Chris Vallimont
- March 20 – Elvis Peguero
- March 26 – Cristian Javier
- March 28 – Austin Cox

=== April ===
- April 2 – Austin Riley
- April 3 – Hayden Senger
- April 6 – Jake Alu
- April 9 – Luis Arráez
- April 11 – Jayden Murray
- April 11 – Ricardo Sánchez
- April 13 – Cam Devanney
- April 15 – Luís Madero
- April 15 – Tony Santillan
- April 16 – Nivaldo Rodríguez
- April 17 – Logan Gillaspie
- April 18 – Stephen Kolek
- April 18 – Peter Lambert
- April 22 – Bryan Abreu
- April 22 – Noah Davis
- April 23 – Evan Sisk
- April 24 – Willi Castro
- April 24 – Bailey Falter
- April 24 – Jovani Morán
- April 28 – Shane McClanahan

=== May ===
- May 1 – Casey Mize
- May 2 – Blake Rutherford
- May 3 – Trey Cabbage
- May 3 – Edwar Colina
- May 3 – Joey Gerber
- May 5 – Logan Gilbert
- May 5 – Joel Peguero
- May 7 – Sean Hjelle
- May 8 – Bryan Hudson
- May 12 – Jonathan Stiever
- May 12 – Terrin Vavra
- May 13 – Nico Hoerner
- May 13 – DaShawn Keirsey Jr.
- May 14 – Tristin English
- May 14 – Blair Henley
- May 14 – James Outman
- May 16 – Richie Palacios
- May 18 – Nash Walters
- May 19 – Conner Capel
- May 19 – Víctor Robles
- May 23 – Logan Allen
- May 23 – Davis Wendzel
- May 28 – Noah Song
- May 29 – Tyler Nevin
- May 30 – Andruw Monasterio

=== June ===
- June 2 – Caleb Kilian
- June 3 – Ryan Jeffers
- June 3 – Luis Urías
- June 4 – Kyle Leahy
- June 5 – Hunter Feduccia
- June 6 – Alex Carrillo
- June 10 – Jared Solomon
- June 11 – Davis Daniel
- June 11 – Max Schuemann
- June 14 – Yohel Pozo
- June 16 – Zach Penrod
- June 17 – Blaine Crim
- June 18 – Evan Lee
- June 19 – Casey Legumina
- June 21 – Grant Anderson
- June 21 – Chris Roycroft
- June 22 – Troy Johnston
- June 22 – Josh Naylor
- June 24 – Payton Henry
- June 24 – Cade Marlowe
- June 26 – Justin Bruihl
- June 26 – Dugan Darnell
- June 26 – Eli Villalobos
- June 27 – Yordan Alvarez
- June 30 – Carlos Cortes

=== July ===
- July 2 – Lucius Fox
- July 2 – Bryan Torres
- July 3 – Michel Otañez
- July 4 – Camilo Doval
- July 4 – Ethan Roberts
- July 8 – Tommy Romero
- July 8 – Chavez Young
- July 11 – Griffin Conine
- July 11 – Ryan Rolison
- July 15 – Landon Knack
- July 17 – Cole Sands
- July 20 – Francisco Pérez
- July 21 – Max Kranick
- July 22 – Isaac Collins
- July 24 – Aaron Schunk
- July 25 – Nick Avila
- July 28 – Brendon Davis
- July 29 – Tommy Henry
- July 30 – Javier Assad
- July 30 – Jake McCarthy

=== August ===
- August 2 – Triston McKenzie
- August 3 – Luis Robert
- August 4 – Jahmai Jones
- August 4 – Mike Soroka
- August 5 – Braxton Garrett
- August 7 – Josh Smith
- August 8 – Garrett Stallings
- August 9 – Nolan Hoffman
- August 10 – Peyton Battenfield
- August 13 – Kolby Allard
- August 13 – Jack Ralston
- August 14 – Eric Wagaman
- August 15 – Isaiah Campbell
- August 15 – Karl Kauffmann
- August 16 – Dominic Canzone
- August 17 – Drey Jameson
- August 18 – Andrew Saalfrank
- August 19 – Kris Bubic
- August 19 – Josh Simpson
- August 19 – Travis Swaggerty
- August 21 – Eric Orze
- August 21 – Ryan Pepiot
- August 21 – Alan Rangel
- August 25 – Grae Kessinger
- August 30 – Ángel Felipe

=== September ===
- September 1 – Anthony Veneziano
- September 2 – Kerry Carpenter
- September 2 – Oliver Dunn
- September 2 – Dominic Fletcher
- September 3 – Carter Kieboom
- September 5 – Steven Kwan
- September 6 – Dustin May
- September 8 – Lars Nootbaar
- September 9 – Nick Sogard
- September 12 – Konnor Pilkington
- September 13 – Taylor Trammell
- September 15 – Tyler Fitzgerald
- September 15 – Justin Slaten
- September 15 – Forrest Whitley
- September 17 – Kade Strowd
- September 18 – Josh Hendrickson
- September 18 – Ricky Karcher
- September 20 – Gustavo Campero
- September 22 – Frank German
- September 22 – Jeremy Peña
- September 24 – Declan Cronin
- September 24 – Patrick Monteverde
- September 25 – Ben Rortvedt
- September 26 – Chase Solesky
- September 29 – David Hamilton
- September 30 – Jesús Luzardo

=== October ===
- October 6 – Bryson Stott
- October 6 – Joey Wentz
- October 7 – Kyle Muller
- October 7 – Jesús Sánchez
- October 8 – Brady Basso
- October 8 – Shinnosuke Ogasawara
- October 8 – Jack Weisenburger
- October 9 – Colton Welker
- October 10 – Vinnie Pasquantino
- October 10 – Leo Rivas
- October 15 – Yerry Rodríguez
- October 22 – Jerar Encarnación
- October 24 – Colin Selby
- October 25 – Claire Eccles
- October 26 – Tanner Gordon
- October 27 – Tyler Phillips
- October 27 – Matt Pushard
- October 28 – Diego Castillo
- October 28 – Zack Thompson
- October 31 – Erik Sabrowski

=== November ===
- November 3 – Logan Driscoll
- November 4 – Brett de Geus
- November 4 – Gavin Hollowell
- November 6 – Fraser Ellard
- November 6 – Riley Pint
- November 7 – Jonathan Pintaro
- November 9 – Michael Busch
- November 9 – Alex Kirilloff
- November 10 – J. J. Bleday
- November 10 – Connor Gillispie
- November 11 – Carson Spiers
- November 12 – Ryan Kreidler
- November 13 – Michael Darrell-Hicks
- November 13 – Trevor Rogers
- November 14 – Spencer Horwitz
- November 15 – Ryan Watson
- November 18 – Shea Langeliers
- November 19 – Braden Shewmake
- November 23 – Gavin Lux
- November 25 – Estevan Florial
- November 28 – Kevin Kelly

=== December ===
- December 1 – Angel Rondón
- December 2 – Kyle McCann
- December 4 – Levi Stoudt
- December 5 – Hayden Wesneski
- December 7 – Spencer Steer
- December 8 – Zac Kristofak
- December 9 – Louis Varland
- December 11 – Jacob Hurtubise
- December 12 – Yerry De Los Santos
- December 12 – Sawyer Gipson-Long
- December 12 – Cole Ragans
- December 12 – Matt Wallner
- December 17 – Brent Headrick
- December 18 – Ronald Acuña Jr.
- December 18 – Grant Hartwig
- December 18 – Brandon Marsh
- December 19 – Rony García
- December 20 – Bryse Wilson
- December 21 – Josiah Gray
- December 22 – Matt Gorski
- December 24 – William Contreras
- December 26 – Logan Davidson
- December 26 – Bryce Jarvis
- December 26 – Easton McGee
- December 26 – Will Robertson
- December 30 – John Rave
- December 31 – José Hernández

== Deaths ==
=== January ===
- January 5 – Emil Roy, 89, pitcher for the 1933 Philadelphia Athletics.
- January 6 – Dick Donovan, 69, five-time All-Star pitcher who played with five different clubs between 1950 and 1965, mainly for the Chicago White Sox and Cleveland Indians; led American League with a 2.40 ERA in 1961 for expansion Washington Senators, and collected 20 wins with 16 complete games and five shutouts in 1962 with Cleveland.
- January 10 – Phil Marchildon, 83, Canadian pitcher and World War II combat veteran; appeared in 185 MLB games over nine seasons between 1940 and 1950, all but one of them for the Philadelphia Athletics, going 19–9 (3.22) for 1947 Mackmen; member, Canadian Baseball Hall of Fame.
- January 10 – Nick Picciuto, 75, third baseman for the 1945 Philadelphia Phillies.
- January 11 – Carol Habben, 63, slugger center fielder who played in the All-American Girls Professional Baseball League.
- January 11 – Stu Martin, 84, All-Star second baseman who played from 1936 through 1943 for the St. Louis Cardinals, Pittsburgh Pirates and Chicago Cubs.
- January 11 – Jerry Neudecker, 66, American League umpire (1966–1985) who officiated 3,026 AL games, three All-Star games, four ALCS matchups, and the 1973 and 1979 World Series; last full-time umpire to wear "balloon" chest protector phased out by the AL during the 1970s.
- January 14 – Jack Moran, 76, Cincinnati sportscaster who teamed with Waite Hoyt on Redlegs/Reds' broadcasts from 1955 to 1961.
- January 19 – Bert Kuczynski, 77, pitcher for the 1943 Philadelphia Athletics.
- January 20 – Curt Flood, 59, three-time All-Star center fielder and seven-time Gold Glove Award winner, who hit .300 or more six times, led the St. Louis Cardinals to World Series titles in 1964 and 1967, and set a precedent when he fought against organized baseball's reserve clause and sought free agency, all the way to the U.S. Supreme Court, unsuccessfully, after refusing a trade from St. Louis to the Philadelphia Phillies in 1969.
- January 21 – Bill McWilliams, 86, pinch hitter in two games with the Boston Red Sox in 1921, who also played for the NFL's Detroit Lions in 1934, and later spent 1941 as third baseman and manager of the Dayton Ducks of the Middle Atlantic League.
- January 22 – George Dockins, 79, pitcher who played with the St. Louis Cardinals in the 1945 season and for the Brooklyn Dodgers in 1947.
- January 27 – Kathryn Beare, 79, catcher for the Fort Wayne Daisies of the All-American Girls Professional Baseball League.
- January 30 – Duane Josephson, 54, All-Star catcher who played for the Chicago White Sox and Boston Red Sox in all or parts of eight seasons spanning 1965–1972.

=== February ===
- February 2 – Art Merewether, 94, pinch hitter in one game for the 1922 Pittsburgh Pirates.
- February 6 – Amby Murray, 83, pitcher for the Boston Bees in the 1936 season.
- February 7 – Manny Salvo, 83, pitcher for the New York Giants, Boston Bees, Philadelphia Phillies and Boston Braves in a span of five seasons from 1939 to 1943, who tied Brooklyn Dodgers' Whit Wyatt with five shutouts for the National League lead in 1940.
- February 7 – Jim Walkup, 87, pitcher who played from 1934 to 1939 for the Detroit Tigers and St. Louis Browns.
- February 8 – Hal Warnock, 85, outfielder for the 1935 St. Louis Browns.
- February 11 – Glen Stewart, 84, infielder who played for the New York Giants and Philadelphia Phillies in all or part of three seasons between 1940 and 1944.
- February 12 – Francis Healy, 86, backup catcher for the New York Giants in part of three seasons spanning 1930–1932, and the St. Louis Cardinals team that won the 1934 World Series; uncle of Fran Healy.
- February 13 – Bobby Adams, 75, third baseman for the Cincinnati Reds and Redlegs, Chicago White Sox, Baltimore Orioles and Chicago Cubs between 1946 and 1959.
- February 18 – Austin Knickerbocker, 78, backup outfielder for the 1947 Philadelphia Athletics.
- February 25 – Cal Abrams, 72, popular Brooklyn Dodgers outfielder in their glory days of the 1950s, who also played for the Cincinnati Reds, Pittsburgh Pirates, Baltimore Orioles and Chicago White Sox.
- February 28 – Les Munns, 88, pitcher who played from 1934 through 1936 for the Brooklyn Dodgers and St. Louis Cardinals.

=== March ===
- March 1 – Monty Kennedy, 74, pitcher who played from 1946 through 1953 for the New York Giants, including the legendary Giants team that clinched the 1951 National League pennant over the Brooklyn Dodgers, on an epic three-run walk-off home run by Bobby Thomson en route to face the New York Yankees in the 1951 World Series.
- March 3 – Harry Davis, 88, first baseman whose 26-year professional playing career included 327 games played for the Detroit Tigers and St. Louis Browns over three seasons between 1932 and 1937.
- March 3 – Billy Jurges, 88, three-time All-Star and slick fielding shortstop, who played for the Chicago Cubs and New York Giants during 17 seasons from 1931 to 1947, and later managed the Boston Red Sox for portions of the 1959 and 1960 seasons.
- March 27 – Fred Chapman, 80, shortstop for the Philadelphia Athletics in a span of three seasons from 1939 to 1941.
- March 30 – Bill Smith, 62, pitcher for the St. Louis Cardinals and Philadelphia Phillies over part of three seasons between 1958 and 1962.

=== April ===
- April 2 – Al Blanche, 87, relief pitcher for the Boston Braves/Bees from 1935 to 1936.
- April 5 – Bill Holland, 81, pitcher who played for the Washington Senators during the 1939 season.
- April 6 – Jack Kent Cooke, 84, Canadian-American media entrepreneur and sports magnate; known primarily as owner of the NFL Washington Redskins, NBA Los Angeles Lakers and NHL Los Angeles Kings, but got his start in professional sports as the highly successful owner of baseball's Triple-A Toronto Maple Leafs from 1951 to 1963, and was the would-be owner of a Toronto franchise in the abortive Continental League of 1959–1960 that forced MLB expansion in 1960s; member, Canadian Baseball Hall of Fame.
- April 7 – Luis Alomá, 73, Cuban relief pitcher who posted a sterling 18–3 won–lost record in 116 career games as a reliever for the 1950–1953 Chicago White Sox.
- April 8 – Bob Cain, 72, pitcher for the Chicago White Sox, Detroit Tigers and St. Louis Browns from 1949 through 1954, who is most remembered for the walk he issued to pinch-hitting midget Eddie Gaedel in 1951.
- April 8 – Homer Peel, 94, backup outfielder who played for the St. Louis Cardinals, Philadelphia Phillies and New York Giants in a span of five seasons from 1927 to 1934.
- April 9 – Joe Coleman, 74, All-Star pitcher who played for the Philadelphia Athletics, Baltimore Orioles and Detroit Tigers in all or part of 10 seasons spanning 1942–1955; his son and grandson both pitched in the majors.
- April 11 – Milt Smith, 69, third baseman who appeared in 36 games with the Cincinnati Redlegs in 1955.
- April 13 – Harry Rosenberg, 88, outfielder and Pacific Coast League stalwart whose MLB tenure consisted of nine appearances, largely as a pinch hitter, with the 1930 New York Giants.
- April 14 – Gus Dugas, 90, Canadian outfielder who played with the Pittsburgh Pirates and Washington Senators over part of three seasons between 1930 and 1934.
- April 15 – Bob Friedrichs, 90, pitcher for the Washington Senators in the 1932 season.
- April 15 – Jim Holloway, 88, pitcher for the 1929 Philadelphia Phillies.
- April 25 – Kay Blumetta, 73, pitcher who spent eleven seasons in the All-American Girls Professional Baseball League.

=== May ===
- May 2 – Don O'Riley, 52, pitcher who played from 1969 to 1970 for the Kansas City Royals.
- May 4 – Butch Weis, 96, left fielder who played for the Chicago Cubs in part of four seasons from 1922 to 1925.
- May 6 – Mel Steiner, 80, National League umpire (1961–1972) who worked in 1,918 games, plus two World Series and two All-Star games.
- May 8 – Bob Whitcher, 80, pitcher for the 1945 Boston Braves.
- May 11 – Vince Sherlock, 87, who played at second base for the Brooklyn Dodgers in its 1935 season.
- May 14 – Eddie Delker, 91, middle infielder and third baseman who played for the St. Louis Cardinals and Philadelphia Phillies in a span of four seasons from 1929 to 1933.
- May 21 – Piper Davis, 79, Negro leagues middle infielder and first baseman who played from 1942 to 1950 for the Birmingham Black Barons.

=== June ===
- June 1 – Mickey Rocco, 81, Cleveland Indians first baseman from 1943 to 1946 who led the American League in fielding percentage at his position in 1943 and 1945.
- June 3 – Pidge Browne, 68, backup first baseman for the Houston Colt .45s in their 1962 inaugural MLB season.
- June 7 – Stan Goletz, 79, pinch hitter who went 3-for-5 in five appearances for the 1941 Chicago White Sox.
- June 8 – Ken Hunt, 62, backup outfielder for the New York Yankees, Los Angeles Angels and Washington Senators in six seasons from 1959 to 1964.
- June 9 – Thornton Lee, 90, two-time All-Star pitcher who played from 1933 through 1948 for the Cleveland Indians, Chicago White Sox and New York Giants, whose most productive season came in 1941, when he paced all American League pitchers with a 2.34 ERA and 30 complete games, while posting a career-high 22 victories, second only to Bob Feller's 25.
- June 15 – Bill Lawrence, 91, backup outfielder for the 1932 Detroit Tigers.
- June 26 – Armando Roche, 70, 18-year-old Cuban pitcher who played for the Washington Senators in the 1945 season.
- June 27 – Ray Benge, 95, pitcher for the Cleveland Indians, Philadelphia Phillies, Brooklyn Dodgers, Boston Bees and Cincinnati Reds during twelve seasons from 1925 to 1938.

=== July ===
- July 2 – Dee Moore, 83, catcher who played for the Cincinnati Reds, Brooklyn Dodgers and Philadelphia Phillies in a span of four seasons from 1936 to 1946, whose baseball career was interrupted because of his military service during World War II.
- July 3 – Rufe Gentry, 79, pitcher for the Detroit Tigers during four seasons between 1943 and 1948.
- July 7 – Jerry Doggett, 80, play-by-play man who worked alongside legendary Vin Scully as #2 announcer on Brooklyn/Los Angeles Dodgers' broadcast team for 32 years (1956 to 1987).
- July 9 – Stan Rojek, 78, shortstop for the Brooklyn Dodgers, Pittsburgh Pirates, St. Louis Cardinals and St. Louis Browns in eight seasons spanning 1942 to 1952; as a Pirate, finished tenth in voting for the 1948 NL MVP Award after ranking among the top-ten in several offensive categories.
- July 10 – Dwight Lowry, 39, backup catcher who played for the Detroit Tigers and Minnesota Twins in parts of four seasons spanning 1984–1988 who was the manager of the Jamestown Jammers of the New York–Penn League at the time of his death.
- July 11 – Joe Hauser, 98, first baseman and minor-league slugger who appeared in 629 MLB games with the Philadelphia Athletics and Cleveland Indians during five seasons between 1922 and 1929; smashed 63 home runs in 1929 for the Baltimore Orioles of the International League, then, four years later, clubbed 69 round-trippers for the Minneapolis Millers of the American Association; overall, hit 479 homers as a professional player.
- July 11 – Robert V. Whitlow, 78, retired United States Air Force colonel and former college football coach and sports administrator who spent three seasons (1963–1965) in the unusual role of "athletic director" of the Chicago Cubs as part of the College of Coaches experiment.
- July 15 – Loel Passe, 80, Houston sportscaster and play-by-play announcer for the minor-league Buffaloes (1950–1961) and major-league Colt .45s/Astros (1962–1978).
- July 16 – Rube Fischer, 80, pitcher for the New York Giants in a span of five seasons from 1941 to 1946.
- July 21 – Roger Bowman, 69, pitcher who played for the New York Giants and Pittsburgh Pirates in all or part of five seasons between 1949 and 1955.
- July 23 – Jeff Cross, 78, middle infielder and third baseman for the St. Louis Cardinals and Chicago Cubs over four seasons from 1942 to 1948, who was one of many baseball players whose career was interrupted by serving in World War II.
- July 27 – Hardin Cathey, 78, pitcher who played for the Washington Senators in 1942.
- July 28 – Bud Hardin, 75, shortstop and second baseman for the 1952 Chicago Cubs.
- July 31 – Eddie Miller, 80, seven-time All-Star and slick fielding shortstop for six National League teams in a span of 14 seasons from 1936 to 1950, who led the league several times in fielding average (5), double plays (4) putouts (3) and assists (1).

=== August ===
- August 8 – Oad Swigart, 82, pitcher who played for the Pittsburgh Pirates in the 1939 and 1940 seasons.
- August 12 – Rex Barney, 72, pitcher for the Brooklyn Dodgers in six seasons between 1943 and 1950, who threw a no-hitter against the New York Giants in 1948, and later served as the public address announcer for the Baltimore Orioles from 1974 until his death.
- August 14 – George Pfister, 78, a catcher for the 1941 Brooklyn Dodgers; later a coach and farm system director.
- August 23 – Guy Curtright, 84, Chicago White Sox outfielder from 1943 to 1946, who hit .291 in his rookie season for the sixth-best spot in the American League, including a 26-game hitting streak.
- August 23 – Buddy Hassett, 85, first baseman who played from 1936 through 1942 for the Brooklyn Dodgers, Boston Bees and Braves, and New York Yankees.
- August 28 – Lou Scoffic, 84, outfielder for the 1936 St. Louis Cardinals.

=== September ===
- September 6 – Mary Lawson, 73, All-American Girls Professional Baseball League player.
- September 7 – Mark Holtz, 51, Texas Rangers' play-by-play announcer on radio or television from 1982 until leukemia forced his retirement on May 22, 1997.
- September 9 – Richie Ashburn, 70, Hall of Fame and seven-time All-Star center fielder who played from 1948 through 1962 for the Philadelphia Phillies, Chicago Cubs and New York Mets, ending with a .308 lifetime batting average, winning two National League batting titles, while leading the league in walks four times, putouts nine times, on base percentage four times, hits three times, triples twice and stolen bases once, retiring with 2,574 hits and a .395 OBP in 2,189 games and had been a broadcaster for the Phillies since his retirement.
- September 19 – Bill Butland, 89, pitcher who played for the Boston Red Sox over part of four seasons from 1940 to 1947.
- September 20 – Jim Hickey, 76, pitcher who played for the Boston Braves in the 1942 and 1944 seasons.
- September 22 – Eddie Sawyer, 87, manager of the 1950 Whiz Kids Phillies, who won the National League pennant on the last day of the season; went 389–422 (.480) in two terms as Phillies' skipper (July 27, 1948 to June 27, 1952, and July 23, 1958 to April 12, 1960).
- September 25 – Bill Donovan, 81, pitcher for the Boston Braves in the 1942 and 1943 seasons.
- September 26 – Woody English, 91, All-Star shortstop/third baseman who played from 1927 through 1938 for the Chicago Cubs and Brooklyn Dodgers, while hitting .300 or more two times and ending fourth in the 1931 National League MVP vote behind Frankie Frisch, Chuck Klein and Bill Terry, also known for managing the Grand Rapids Chicks of the All-American Girls Professional Baseball League from 1952 to 1954, leading his team to a Championship in 1953 and two playoff appearances.
- September 27 – Alex Konikowski, 69, pitcher who played for the New York Giants in three seasons between 1948 and 1954, also a member of the 1951 National League champion Giants.
- September 28 – Connie Grob, 64, pitcher for the 1956 Washington Senators.

=== October ===
- October 6 – Johnny Vander Meer, 82, four-time All-Star pitcher who played for the Cincinnati Reds, Chicago Cubs and Cleveland Indians in a span of 13 seasons from 1937 to 1951, also a member of the 1940 World Series champion Reds and a three-time National League strikeouts leader, perhaps best known for being the only pitcher in Major League Baseball history to throw two consecutive no-hitters, against the Boston Braves and the Brooklyn Dodgers in June 1938.
- October 7 – Lou Possehl, 71, pitcher who played for the Philadelphia Phillies in all or part of five seasons spanning 1946–1952.
- October 9 – Chuck Templeton, 65, pitcher who played from 1955 to 1956 with the Brooklyn Dodgers.
- October 14 – Al Somers, 92, umpiring instructor who developed thousands of students for the profession, including 70 major league umpires.
- October 21 – Dolph Camilli, 90, two-time All-Star first baseman and member of four teams in 12 seasons from 1933 to 1945, who earned the National League MVP Award in 1941 after leading the league in home runs and runs batted in, while helping the Brooklyn Dodgers win the NL pennant for the first time since 1920; son Doug was an MLB catcher and coach.
- October 30 – Barney Martin, 74, pitcher who appeared in one game for the Cincinnati Reds in the 1953 season.
- October 31 – Sam Hairston, 77, catcher who played for the Birmingham Black Barons and the Indianapolis Clowns of the Negro leagues before joining the Chicago White Sox in 1951, well known as the patriarch of a three-generation baseball family, being the father of MLB players Jerry Hairston Sr. and Johnny Hairston, as well as the grandfather of big leaguers Jerry Hairston Jr. and Scott Hairston, while a son, Sammy Hairston Jr., and three grandsons, Johnny Hairston Jr., Jeff Hairston and Jason Hairston, played in Minor League Baseball.

=== November ===
- November 2 – Roy McMillan, 68, two-time All-Star shortstop who played from 1951 through 1966 for the Cincinnati Reds, Milwaukee Braves and New York Mets; earned National Leagues's first three Gold Gloves between 1957 and 1959; became a coach in 1970 and served as interim manager of the 1972 Milwaukee Brewers and 1975 Mets.
- November 4 – Johnny Dickshot, 87, outfielder who played for the Pittsburgh Pirates, New York Giants and Chicago White Sox in a span of six seasons spanning 1936–1945.
- November 13 – Bill Conroy, 82, catcher for the Philadelphia Athletics and Boston Red Sox during six seasons between 1935 and 1944.
- November 13 – Moe Thacker, 63, backup catcher who played for the Chicago Cubs and St. Louis Cardinals in all or part of five seasons between 1958 and 1963.
- November 13 – Al Weston, 91, All-America Boston College Eagles football quarterback who made three appearances as a pinch hitter with the Boston Braves in its 1929 season.
- November 16 – Russ Meyer, 75, pitcher known as the Mad Monk for his fiery temper, who posted a 94–73 record and 3.99 ERA over 90 games for six different teams in 12 seasons spanning 1946–1959, and also was a member of the 1955 World Series champions Brooklyn Dodgers.
- November 20 – Dick Littlefield, 71, well-traveled pitcher who played for nine teams from 1950 through 1958, earning 15 of his 33 wins with the Pittsburgh Pirates from 1954 to 1956.
- November 22 – Peter Hardy, 80, Toronto businessman who was CEO of the Blue Jays from 1982 to 1989; member, Canadian Baseball Hall of Fame.
- November 27 – Buck Leonard, 90, Hall of Fame first baseman who played in Negro league baseball from 1934 through 1950 with the Homestead Grays, helping them to win three Negro World Series championships and earning 13 All-Star selections, while ranking regularly among the league leaders in batting average and home runs.
- November 27 – Paul Masterson, 82, pitcher who played from 1940 through 1942 for the Philadelphia Phillies.
- November 28 – Sylvia Wronski, 72, All-American Girls Professional Baseball League pitcher for the 1944 Milwaukee Chicks champion club.
- November 30 – Bernie Creger, 70, shortstop who played for the St. Louis Cardinals in the 1947 season.

=== December ===
- December 2 – Steve Hamilton, 63, southpaw relief pitcher who played from 1961 through 1972 for six different teams, mainly the New York Yankees (1963–1970); with Gene Conley, one of two people to have played in both a World Series and an NBA finals; known for throwing the "folly-floater", also known as the eephus pitch.
- December 3 – Vic Lombardi, 75, pitcher for the Brooklyn Dodgers and Pittsburgh Pirates in six seasons from 1945 to 1950.
- December 6 – Lou Clinton, 60, outfielder whose career spanned eight seasons from 1960 to 1967, while playing for the Boston Red Sox, Los Angeles Angels, Kansas City Athletics, Cleveland Indians and New York Yankees.
- December 14 – Frank Baumholtz, 79, outfielder who played for the Cincinnati Reds, Chicago Cubs and Philadelphia Phillies in a span of ten seasons from 1947 to 1957.
- December 14 – Leola Brody, 75, utility player and one of the founding members of the All-American Girls Professional Baseball League in its inaugural season of 1943.
- December 17 – Mel Mazzera, 83, backup outfielder who played with the St. Louis Browns and Philadelphia Phillies in all or part of five seasons between 1935 and 1940.
- December 22 – Hal Rice, 73, part-time outfielder for the St. Louis Cardinals, Pittsburgh Pirates and Chicago Cubs from 1948 to 1954.
- December 22 – Flea Clifton, 89, backup infielder who played for the Detroit Tigers from 1934 through 1937, while serving as the starting third baseman for the 1935 World Championship Tigers.
- December 22 – José Oliva, 26, Dominican Republic infielder who played from 1994 to 1995 for the Atlanta Braves and St. Louis Cardinals.
