= Weafer =

Weafer is a surname. Notable people with the surname include:

- Hal Weafer (1900–1978), American baseball player
- Ken Weafer (1913–2005), American baseball player
