= Coscarart =

Coscarart is a surname. Notable people with the surname include:

- Joe Coscarart (1909–1993), American baseball player
- Pete Coscarart (1913–2002), American baseball player, brother of Joe
