= Al Spohrer =

American baseball player (1902-1972)

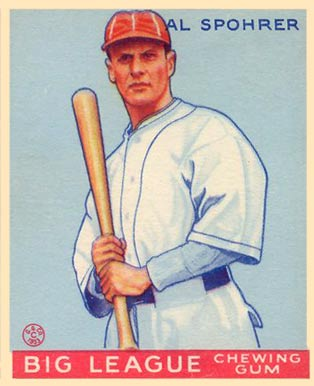
- Catcher
- Born: December 3, 1902; Philadelphia, Pennsylvania, U.S.
- Died: July 17, 1972 (aged 69); Plymouth, New Hampshire, U.S.
- Batted: Right Threw: Right

MLB debut
- April 13, 1928, for the New York Giants

Last MLB appearance
- September 29, 1935, for the Boston Braves

MLB statistics
- Batting average: .259
- Home runs: 6
- Runs batted in: 199
- Stats at Baseball Reference

Teams
- New York Giants (1928); Boston Braves (1928–1935)

Alfred Ray Spohrer (December 3, 1902 – July 17, 1972), was an American professional baseball player. He played in Major League Baseball as a catcher for the New York Giants and Boston Braves.

== Baseball career ==
He began his professional baseball career in 1921 at the age of 18 with the Winston-Salem Twins of the Piedmont League. In 1927 he joined the Wilkes-Barre Barons where he posted a .333 batting average in 98 games, winning the Most Valuable Player Award for the New York–Pennsylvania League. The Barons sold Spohrer's contract to John McGraw's New York Giants for $10,000, a record for a Class B player at the time.

Spohrer made his major league debut with the New York Giants on April 13, 1928 at the age of 25 but, after only two games, he was traded along with Virgil Barnes, Ben Cantwell and Bill Clarkson to the Boston Braves for Joe Genewich. He served as a backup catcher for the Braves working behind Zack Taylor in 1928. In 1929, Taylor was traded to the Chicago Cubs and Spohrer became the Braves starting catcher, posting a .272 batting average with 21 doubles and 48 runs batted in. Although he led National League catchers in errors, he finished second in games caught and third in putouts.

Spohrer had his best season offensively in 1930 when he posted a .361 on-base percentage, a .441 slugging percentage and led the Braves with a .317 batting average in 112 games. That season, a lively ball wound with special Australian wool was used by major league baseball, resulting in a league batting average that was above .300 for the only time in baseball history. In 1931, the National League introduced a new, heavier ball to counteract the prodigious offensive statistics of the previous year. The raised stitching on the ball allowed pitchers to grip the ball better and throw sharper curveballs.

From 1933 to 1935 Spohrer shared catching duties with Shanty Hogan who had been obtained from the New York Giants. In February 1936, Spohrer was released to the Columbus Red Birds of the American Association. He decided to retire as a baseball player at the age of 32 rather than play in the minor leagues.

Spohrer is remembered for a game in 1929 against the Chicago Cubs at Wrigley Field when, he tried to distract one of baseball's greatest hitters during an at bat. Rogers Hornsby, who had been Spohrer's teammate on the Braves in 1928 before being traded to the Cubs, was known for his love of a good steak dinner. As Hornsby stepped up to home plate to take his turn at bat, Spohrer made an attempt to distract him from his hitting by talking about the great steaks available from a butcher back home in Boston. Hornsby replied, "Is that so?" as the first pitch was a called strike. Spohrer proceeded to tell Hornsby that his wife was also an extremely capable cook as strike two was called. Spohrer continued with his ruse by telling Hornsby that during his next visit to Boston, he was welcome to the Spohrer household to try one of these steaks whereupon, Hornsby proceeded to hit the next pitch out of the park for a home run. After rounding the bases and touching home plate, Hornsby was said to have asked Spohrer, "What night shall we make it, Al?"

In January 1930, Spohrer tried his hand at boxing, losing in four rounds by technical knockout to Chicago White Sox player Art Shires at the Boston Garden. Coincidentally, the two players became roommates when Shires joined the Braves in 1932.

== Career statistics ==
In an 8-year major league career, Spohrer played in 756 games, accumulating 575 hits in 2,218 at bats for a .259 career batting average along with 6 home runs, 199 runs batted in and an on-base percentage of .301. He retired with a .972 fielding percentage.
