= Ken Weaver =

Ken Weaver may refer to:

- Ken Weaver (Ackley Bridge), fictional character
- Ken Weaver (musician) (born 1940), American singer, songwriter and musician
- Ken Weaver (racing driver) (born 1956), American racing driver

== See also ==
- Ken Weafer (1913–2005), American baseball pitcher
