= Tresh =

Tresh is a surname. Notable people with that surname include:

- Mike Tresh (1914–1966), American baseball player
- Tom Tresh (1938–2008), American baseball player
