= Bill Ford (pitcher) =

American baseball player (1915-1994)

- Ford, c. 1941
- Pitcher
- Born: October 14, 1915; Buena Vista, Pennsylvania, US
- Died: April 6, 1994 (aged 78); Jefferson, Pennsylvania, US
- Batted: Right Threw: Right

MLB debut
- September 27, 1936, for the Boston Bees

Last MLB appearance
- September 27, 1936, for the Boston Bees

MLB statistics
- Win–loss record: 0–0
- Earned run average: infinite
- Strikeouts: 0
- Stats at Baseball Reference

Teams
- Boston Bees (1936)

William Brown Ford (October 14, 1915 – April 6, 1994) was an American professional baseball pitcher who appeared in one Major League Baseball (MLB) game with the Boston Bees in 1936. His major-league appearance was not listed in official baseball records until 2003, due to a record-keeping error that credited his lone appearance to a similarly named Bees pitcher, Gene Ford.

== Biography ==
Ford was born October 14, 1915, in Buena Vista, Pennsylvania. He attended Pennsylvania State College, and played on the Penn State baseball team. Listed at 6 feet 2 inches (1.88 m) and 200 pounds (91 kg), he threw and batted right-handed.

On the last day of the 1936 season, September 27, Ford made his major-league debut, appearing as the starting pitcher for the Boston Bees against the Philadelphia Phillies at Baker Bowl in Philadelphia. Still only 20 years old, he was the fifth-youngest MLB player that season. After the Braves batted and took a 1–0 lead in the top of the first inning, Ford failed to retire a single batter, walking all three batters he faced in the bottom of the inning. He was relieved by Guy Bush, who allowed two of the inherited runners to score—those two runs were charged to Ford. Bush wound up pitching nine innings of relief, and won the game for the Braves, 7–3. Ford never played in another major-league game, leaving him with an earned run average (ERA) of infinity for his lone appearance.

From 1937 through 1941, Ford played for 10 different teams in Minor League Baseball, mostly at the Class C and Class B levels. After compiling a 3–6 record and 7.30 ERA as a pitcher in 1937, Ford played as an outfielder and first baseman for the remainder of his career. Records, which are incomplete for the era, show that he had a .300 batting average in 110 games during 1939 while playing for the McKeesport Little Pirates, a farm team of the Pittsburgh Pirates.

Ford's draft registration card of October 1940 indicates he was again attending Penn State, and he was listed as a senior majoring in physical education in the college's 1941 yearbook. Ford later resided in Glassport, Pennsylvania; he owned a coal company in West Elizabeth and a golf course in Forward Township. He died on April 6, 1994, aged 78, and was survived by his wife and three children. He was buried in Mount Vernon Cemetery in Elizabeth, Pennsylvania. His obituary did not mention his brief MLB career.

== Statistical re-discovery ==
Ford's appearance with the Bees did not appear in any official MLB records during his lifetime. In 2003, research by Rick Benner of the Society for American Baseball Research (SABR) discovered that Bill Ford's September 27, 1936, appearance had been incorrectly attributed to fellow-pitcher Gene Ford, who had appeared in one game for Boston earlier that year. The official records were corrected to show that Gene Ford pitched in one game for the 1936 Bees (on June 17), and Bill Ford also pitched in one game for the 1936 Bees (on September 27).

Ford's re-discovery as an MLB player is particularly unusual. Although researchers will very occasionally find a previously undocumented major-league player to add to the official records, such players are usually from the 19th century. Finding one who played as late as 1936 is extremely rare.
