= 1997 Senior League World Series =

American youth baseball tournament

Tournament information
- Location: Kissimmee, Florida
- Dates: August 10–16, 1997

Final positions
- Champions: San Francisco, Venezuela
- Runner-up: Yucaipa, California

The 1997 Senior League World Series took place from August 10–16 in Kissimmee, Florida, United States. San Francisco, Venezuela defeated Yucaipa, California in the championship game. It was Venezuela's second straight championship.

== Teams ==
United States	International
(Florida) Union Park, Florida; District 3 Host	LaSalle, Ontario; Turtle Club; Canada
(Michigan) Saginaw, Michigan; North Saginaw; Central	(England) Huntingdon, England; RAF Alconbury; Europe
Lewisburg, Pennsylvania; Lewisburg; East	(Guam) Hagåtña, Guam; Central; Far East
(Florida) Jacksonville, Florida; Arlington; South	(Venezuela) San Francisco, Venezuela; San Francisco; Latin America
(California) Yucaipa, California; Yucaipa American; West	

== Results ==
Winner's Bracket

Opening Game
—	Canada	3
—	Florida	2

—
1–0	Canada	4
—	(Florida) Host	6
—	Michigan	7
—	Guam	6
—	California	1
—	Venezuela	3
—	England	4
—	Pennsylvania	11

—
1–0	(Florida) Host	5
1–0	Michigan	0
1–0	Venezuela	5
1–0	Pennsylvania	0

Bracket Final
2–0	(Florida) Host	2
2–0	Venezuela	9

Loser's Bracket

—
1
0–1	Florida	11
0–1	California	9
7
3
0–1	Guam	2
0–1	England	0
5

—
1–1	Canada	0
1–1	Florida	3
1–1	Pennsylvania	2
1–1	California	3

—
1–1	Michigan	0
2–1	Florida	16
2–1	(Florida) Host	1
2–1	California	2

Bracket Final
3–1	Florida	4
3–1	California (F/8)	5

Placement Bracket

—
1
0–2	England	1
2
7
3
6
0–2	Guam	7
5

—
1–2	Canada	7
1–2	Guam	4
1–2	Michigan	4
1–2	Pennsylvania	7

—
2–2	(Florida) Host	10
2–2	Canada	0
3–2	Florida
2–2	Pennsylvania

Third-place game
3–2	(Florida) Host	16
3–2	Pennsylvania	2

Elimination Round

Semifinals
2–0	(Florida) Host	2
2–0	Venezuela	9
3–1	Florida	4
3–1	California (F/8)	5

World championship
3–0	Venezuela	10 · 3
4–1	California	13 · 0
Third-place game
3–2	(Florida) Host	16
3–2	Pennsylvania	2

1997 Senior League World Series Champions
San Francisco, Venezuela
