= Buena Vista, Pennsylvania =

Unincorporated community in Pennsylvania, US

- Unincorporated community
- Location within Pennsylvania
- Coordinates: 40°16′38″N 79°47′57″W
- Country: United States
- State: Pennsylvania
- County: Allegheny
- Township: Elizabeth
- Elevation: 764 ft (233 m)
- Time zone: UTC-5 (Eastern (EST))
  - Summer (DST): UTC-4 (EDT)
- ZIP code: 15018
- GNIS feature ID: 1170594

Buena Vista (/ˌbjuːnə ˈvɪstə/ BEW-nə VIST-ə) is an unincorporated community in Elizabeth Township, Allegheny County, Pennsylvania, United States, located just outside Pittsburgh on the Youghiogheny River. The Great Allegheny Passage rail trail runs through the community. Buena Vista was laid out in 1849 by James B. McGrew for the heirs of Daniel Greenawalt. For a time, it served as a mining town. Like many places in the US with this name, Buena Vista was named for the 1847 Battle of Buena Vista during the Mexican–American War.

Notable people to have come from Buena Vista are former baseball players Bill Ford and Brian Holton.

== Demographics ==
Historical population
Census	Pop.	Note	%±
2023 (est.)	314

The United States Census Bureau defined Buena Vista as a census designated place in 2023.
