= Al Blanche =

American baseball player (1909-1997)

- Relief pitcher
- Born: September 21, 1909; Somerville, Massachusetts, U.S.
- Died: April 2, 1997 (aged 87); Melrose, Massachusetts, U.S.
- Batted: Right Threw: Right

MLB debut
- August 23, 1935, for the Boston Braves

Last MLB appearance
- June 19, 1936, for the Boston Bees

MLB statistics
- Win–loss record: 0–1
- Earned run average: 3.78
- Strikeouts: 8
- Stats at Baseball Reference

Teams
- Boston Braves / Bees (1935–1936)

Prosper Albert Blanche (September 21, 1909 – April 2, 1997) was an American Major League Baseball pitcher. He played two seasons with the Boston Braves / Bees from 1935 to 1936.

== Biography ==
A native of Somerville, Massachusetts, Blanche was the son of Italian emigrants and the youngest of four children. He attended Somerville High School, and played college baseball at Providence College, graduating with a degree in philosophy in 1934. While at Providence, he played summer baseball in the Cape Cod Baseball League (CCBL). In 1931, he began the CCBL season with Wareham, but finished the season with Falmouth. In 1933 and 1934, he pitched for the league's Harwich team, winning the decisive third game of a three-game championship series sweep for Harwich over Falmouth.

Blanche caught on with the big league Braves near the end of the 1935 season. Though it was the end of a dismal campaign for the Boston club, Blanche posted an impressive 1.56 ERA in 17 1/3 innings over six appearances. His debut came on August 23, when he tossed four innings in relief of Ben Cantwell, allowing two earned runs and smacking a hit in the Braves' 7–5 loss to the Pittsburgh Pirates at Braves Field. His best outing came on September 29 in the first game of a home doubleheader against the New York Giants and hurler Al Smith. With the Braves down 5–2 after three innings, Boston starter Ed Brandt was lifted for Blanche, who finished with six strong shutout innings in the eventual 5–3 loss.

Blanche began the following season with Boston, now known as the "Bees", appearing in 11 games and posting a 6.19 ERA in 16 innings before being optioned to the minor leagues. He made one appearance with the Syracuse Chiefs, then finished out the 1936 season with the Columbia Senators of the Sally League. In 1938, he was back in the CCBL with Orleans. Over his two major league seasons, Blanche tossed 33 1/3 innings with a 3.78 ERA and eight strikeouts. He went 2-for-10 at the plate, and committed two errors in 16 chances in the field.

Blanche served in the United States Air Force during World War II, and died in 1997 in Melrose, Massachusetts, at age 87.
