= 1997 Junior League World Series =

Tournament information
- Location: Taylor, Michigan
- Dates: August 11–16

Final positions
- Champions: Salem, New Hampshire
- Runner-up: Mission Viejo, California

The 1997 Junior League World Series took place from August 11–16 in Taylor, Michigan, United States. Salem, New Hampshire defeated Mission Viejo, California in the championship game.

== Teams ==
United States	International
Ashtabula, Ohio; Ashtabula; Central	Surrey, British Columbia; Kennedy-Surrey; Canada
Salem, New Hampshire; Salem Youth; East	Svoboda nad Úpou, Czech Republic; Svoboda; Europe
Richmond, Texas; Lamar; South	Monterrey, Mexico; Las Puentes; Mexico
Mission Viejo, California; North Mission Viejo; West	Yabucoa, Puerto Rico; Juan Antonio Bibiloni; Puerto Rico

== Results ==
Upper round 1	Upper round 2	Upper final	World Championship
—	Mexico	10
—	Czech Republic	2
1–0	Mexico	2
1–0	California	15
—	Canada	1
—	California	3
2–0	California	2
2–0	New Hampshire	4
—	Puerto Rico	3
—	Texas	2
1–0	Puerto Rico	1
1–0	New Hampshire	7
—	New Hampshire	6
—	Ohio	1	3–0	New Hampshire	4	–
3–1	California	1	–
Lower round 1	Lower round 2	Lower round 3	Lower final
1–1	Puerto Rico	2
0–1	Czech Republic	2	1–1	Canada	6	2–1	California	3
0–1	Canada	12	2–1	Canada	3	3–1	Canada	2
2–1	Texas	1
1–1	Mexico	3
0–1	Texas	11	1–1	Texas	4
0–1	Ohio	1

1997 Junior League World Series Champions
Salem Youth LL
Salem, New Hampshire
