= Gene Ford (pitcher, born 1912) =

American baseball player (1912–1970)

- Ford, c. 1933
- Relief pitcher
- Born: June 23, 1912; Fort Dodge, Iowa, U.S.
- Died: September 7, 1970 (aged 58); Emmetsburg, Iowa, U.S.
- Batted: Right Threw: Right

MLB debut
- June 17, 1936, for the Boston Bees

Last MLB appearance
- August 27, 1938, for the Chicago White Sox

MLB statistics
- Win–loss record: 0–0
- Earned run average: 9.56
- Strikeouts: 2
- Stats at Baseball Reference

Teams
- Boston Bees (1936); Chicago White Sox (1938)

Eugene Matthew Ford (June 23, 1912 – September 7, 1970) was an American professional baseball pitcher who played in Major League Baseball (MLB) for the Boston Bees during 1936 and the Chicago White Sox during 1938. Listed at 6 feet 2 inches (1.88 m) and 195 pounds (88 kg), he batted and threw right-handed.

== Biography ==
Born in Fort Dodge, Iowa, Ford attended the University of Iowa, where he pitched for the Hawkeyes baseball team, and was captain of the 1935 varsity. Following his graduation, he pitched in Minor League Baseball with the Peoria Tractors in 1935 and Columbia Senators in 1936, both Class B teams.

Ford made a single major-league appearance for the 1936 Boston Bees, pitching two innings in relief on June 17 against the St. Louis Cardinals; he allowed one run on two hits. Ford then missed the 1937 season, due to injury sustained when he fell from bleachers at his alma mater. He finished his professional career with four relief appearances for the 1938 Chicago White Sox, allowing 16 runs in 14 innings. Overall for his limited major-league career, Ford pitched in five games, all in relief, and compiled a 9.56 earned run average (ERA) while striking out two batters and walking 12 batters in 16 innings pitched. As a batter, he registered one hit in six at bats, and as a fielder he did not commit an error in five total chances.

After his baseball career, Ford was a farmer in Emmetsburg, Iowa. He served as secretary of the Iowa Farmers' Union and was active in the Democratic Party. He died in 1970 in Emmetsburg from a heart attack at age 58; he was survived by four siblings.

== See also ==
- Bill Ford (pitcher), whose lone MLB appearance was incorrectly attributed to Gene Ford until 2003
