= Al Weston =

American baseball and football player (1905–1997)

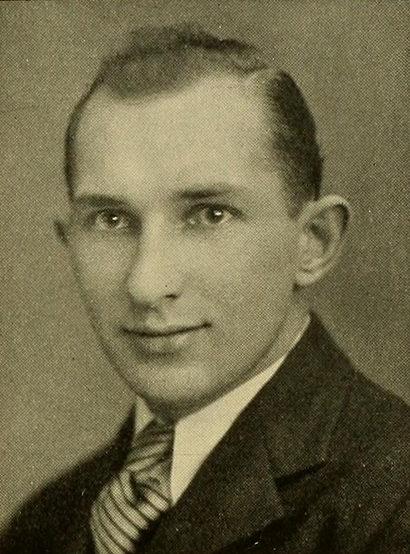
- Weston pictured in Sub Turri 1929, Boston College yearbook
- Pinch hitter
- Born: December 11, 1905; Lynn, Massachusetts, U.S.
- Died: November 13, 1997 (aged 91); San Diego, California, U.S.
- Batted: Right Threw: Right

MLB debut
- June 29, 1929, for the Boston Braves

Last MLB appearance
- July 8, 1929, for the Boston Braves

MLB statistics
- Games played: 3
- At bats: 2
- Strikeouts: 2
- Stats at Baseball Reference

Teams
- Boston Braves (1929)

Alfred John Weston (December 11, 1905 – November 13, 1997) was an American professional baseball player with the Boston Braves and quarterback of the Boston College football team.

== Baseball ==
After graduating from Boston College in June 1929, Weston signed as a free agent with the Boston Braves. He made his major league debut on July 7, 1929. He would only play in three games over two days, going 0 for 3 in three pinch hitting appearances, striking out twice. He played the rest of the 1929 and 1930 seasons with the Providence Grays. He hit .235/~.305/.315 in 62 games for them in 1929 and fielded .981 at first base. In 1930, he batted .322 with 7 HR and 60 RBI. In 1931 his contract was sold to the Richmond Byrds, but he did not report.

In 1931, he played summer baseball for Orleans in the Cape Cod Baseball League. He was back in the league in 1933 playing first base for the Provincetown team in its only season in the league.

== Football ==
Weston was an All-America football player known for being a fine running quarterback. He was the starting quarterback on the undefeated 1928 Eagle team that won the Eastern Football Championship. He was inducted into the Boston College Varsity Club Athletic Hall of Fame in 1970. He held the BC single season record for touchdowns (12) from 1926 to 1973.
