= Winning percentage =

Sports statistic

In sports, a winning percentage, or Copeland score, is the fraction of games or matches a team or individual has won. The statistic is commonly used in standings or rankings to compare teams or individuals. It is defined as wins divided by the total number of matches played (i.e. wins plus draws plus losses). A draw counts as a 1/2 win.

$$\text{winning percentage} = {\text{wins}+0.5\cdot\text{ties}\over\text{total games}}$$

== Discussion ==
For example, if a team's season record is 30 wins and 20 losses, the winning percentage would be 60% or 0.600:

$$60\% = {30\over50}\cdot100\%$$

If a team's season record is 30–15–5 (i.e. it has won thirty games, lost fifteen and tied five times), and if the five tie games are counted as 2 1/2 wins, then the team has an adjusted record of 32 1/2 wins, resulting in a 65% or .650 winning percentage for the fifty total games from:

$$65\% = {32.5\over50}\cdot100\%$$

In North America, winning percentages are expressed as decimal values to three decimal places. It is the same value, but without the last step of multiplying by 100% in the formula above. Furthermore, they are usually read aloud as if they were whole numbers (e.g. 1.000, "a thousand" or 0.500, "five hundred"). In this case, the name "winning percentage" is actually a misnomer, since it is not expressed as a percentage. A winning percentage such as .536 ("five thirty-six") expressed as a percentage would be 53.6%.

Winning percentage is one way to compare the record of two teams; however, another standard method most frequently used in baseball and professional basketball standings is games behind. In baseball, a pitcher is assessed wins and losses as an individual statistic and thus has his own winning percentage, based on his win–loss record.

However, in association football, a manager's abilities may be measured by win percentage. In this case, the formula is wins divided by total number of matches; draws are not considered as "half-wins", and the quotient is always in percentage form.

In the National Football League, division winners and playoff qualifiers are technically determined by winning percentage and not by number of wins. Ties are currently counted as half a win and half a loss, however, prior to 1972 tied games were disregarded for the purposes of this calculation — a 10–2–2 record (10÷12 ≈ .833) would then have outranked an 11–3 record (11÷14 ≈ .786). Tie games, a fairly common occurrence in football before the introduction of overtime, were thus somewhat more valuable to teams with a winning record, as compared with current rules.

Some leagues and competitions may instead use a points percentage system, changing the nature of this statistic. In this type of method, used in many group tournament ranking systems, the competitors are awarded a certain number of points per win, fewer points per tie, and none for a loss. The teams are then ranked by the total number of these accumulated points. One such method is the "three points for a win", where three points are awarded for winning a game, one point is awarded for a draw, and no points are awarded for a loss. The National Hockey League (which uses an overtime and shootouts to break all ties) awards two points for a win in regulation or overtime/shootout, one point for an overtime loss, and none for a regulation loss.

== Statistics ==
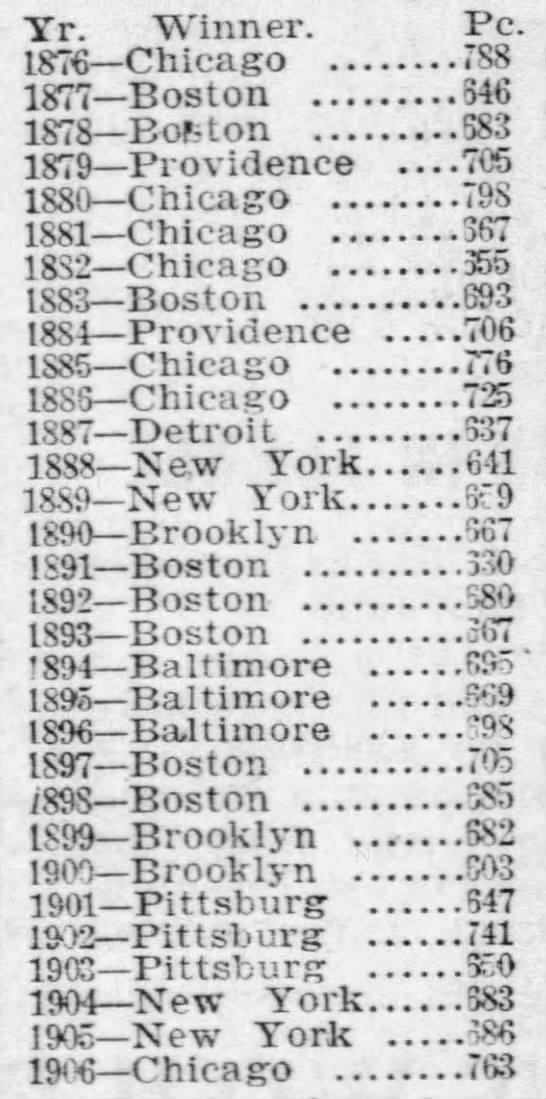
List of National League winning teams from 1876 to 1906, as published in The Topeka Daily Herald in October 1906, including a winning percentage ("Pc.") column

=== Major League Baseball ===
This table lists the best and worst winning percentages in the history of the National League (NL) and American League (AL) of Major League Baseball (MLB).

Win %	Wins	Losses	Year	Team	Comment
.798	67	17	1880	Chicago White Stockings	best pre-modern season
.763	116	36	1906	Chicago Cubs	best 154-game NL season
.721	111	43	1954	Cleveland Indians	best 154-game AL season
.716	116	46	2001	Seattle Mariners	best 162-game AL season
.685	111	51	2022	Los Angeles Dodgers	best 162-game NL season
.253	41	121	2024	Chicago White Sox	worst 162-game AL season
.250	40	120	1962	New York Mets	worst 162-game NL season
.248	38	115	1935	Boston Braves	worst 154-game NL season
.235	36	117	1916	Philadelphia Athletics	worst 154-game AL season
.130	20	134	1899	Cleveland Spiders	worst pre-modern season

Note: some team records sum to less than the season schedule (154 or 162 games) due to rain outs.

=== National Basketball Association ===
Win %	Wins	Losses	Season	Team	Comment
.890	73	9	2015–16	Golden State Warriors	best 82-game season
.110	9	73	1972–73	Philadelphia 76ers	worst 82-game season
.106	7	59	2011–12	Charlotte Bobcats	worst season statistically

=== National Hockey League ===
In the National Hockey League, teams are awarded two points for a win, and one point for either a tie (a discontinued statistic) or an overtime loss. It can be calculated as follows:

$$\mathrm{Points}\ \mathrm{percentage} = \frac{\mathrm{Points}}{\mathrm{Total \ possible \ points}}
= \frac{ \mathrm{Overtime \ Losses + (2 \times Wins)}}{\mathrm{ 2 \times Games \ Played }}$$

Points %	Wins	Losses	Ties	Points	Season	Team	Comments
.825	60	8	12	132	1976–77	Montreal Canadiens	best points % in post-expansion NHL
.131	8	67	5	21	1974–75	Washington Capitals	worst points % in post-expansion NHL

== See also ==
- Group tournament ranking system
