= Jim McCloskey =

American baseball player (1910-1971)

- Pitcher
- Born: May 26, 1910; Danville, Pennsylvania, U.S.
- Died: August 18, 1971 (aged 61); Jersey City, New Jersey, U.S.
- Batted: Left Threw: Left

MLB debut
- April 21, 1936, for the Boston Bees

Last MLB appearance
- May 12, 1936, for the Boston Bees

MLB statistics
- Win–loss record: 0–0
- Earned run average: 11.25
- Strikeouts: 2
- Stats at Baseball Reference

Teams
- Boston Bees (1936)

James Ellwood "Irish" McCloskey (May 26, 1910 – August 18, 1971) was an American Major League Baseball pitcher. He played one season with the Boston Bees in 1936.

McCloskey attended high school at Lancaster High School in Lancaster, New York. In 2013, he was inducted into the high school's athletic hall of fame.
