= Hal Weafer =

American baseball player and umpire

- Born: Harold Leon Weafer; March 27, 1900; Woburn, Massachusetts, U.S.
- Died: August 23, 1978 (aged 78); Richmond, Virginia, U.S.
- Occupation: Umpire
- Years active: 1943–1947
- Employer: American League

Harold Leaon Weafer (March 27, 1900 – August 23, 1978) was an American professional baseball player and umpire. Weafer was a first baseman in minor league baseball. He became an American League umpire in 1943 and stayed there until 1947. He umpired 776 major league games.

== Career ==
Hal Weafer began his baseball career in 1918, playing in the International League. Weafer traveled around the minor leagues for over a decade. His longest stint came with the Richmond Colts of the Virginia League, with whom he played with from 1924 to 1927. From 1928 to 1933, he served as a player-manager for several clubs.

He retired as a player after 1933 and became a minor league umpire. He worked in the Bi-State League in 1935, the International League from 1936 to 1937, and the American Association from 1938 to 1942. After the president of the American Association suggested that Weafer lose 15–20 pounds for a promotion to MLB umpiring, he began dieting and chopping down Christmas trees. He slimmed down from 220 pounds to 170 pounds. He received his major league opportunity in September 1942. He remained an AL umpire until 1947. After his MLB umpiring days, Weafer served as an umpire supervisor in the minor leagues. He approved and worked with graduates of the Al Somers Umpire School.

== Personal life ==
Weafer attended Burdett College in Massachusetts. His brother Ken Weafer played in one game for the Boston Bees in 1936.

== See also ==
- List of Major League Baseball umpires (disambiguation)
