= Johnnie Tyler =

American baseball player (1906–1972)

- Outfielder
- Born: July 30, 1906; Mount Pleasant, Pennsylvania, U.S.
- Died: July 11, 1972 (aged 65); Mount Pleasant, Pennsylvania, U.S.
- Batted: Both Threw: Right

MLB debut
- September 16, 1934, for the Boston Braves

Last MLB appearance
- September 29, 1935, for the Boston Braves

MLB statistics
- Batting average: .321
- Home runs: 2
- Runs batted in: 12
- Stats at Baseball Reference

Teams
- Boston Braves (1934–1935)

John Anthony Tyler (July 30, 1906 – July 11, 1972) was an American Major League Baseball player who played outfield for the Boston Braves in 1934 and 1935.
