= The Topeka Daily Herald =

The Topeka Daily Herald was a daily newspaper published in Topeka, Kansas from 1901 through 1907. Its first publication date was on July 1, 1901. It was founded by Dell Keizer who served as the paper's publisher and manager. His father in-law, longtime Kansas newspaperman J. K. Hudson, was the paper's editor. The paper declared bankruptcy in July 1907 and was placed into the receivership of former Topeka city attorney Charles F. Spencer. The paper ceased publication at this time. The newspaper's publications are held in the Library of Congress. ·
