= Bob Smith (pitcher, born 1895) =

American baseball player (1895–1987)

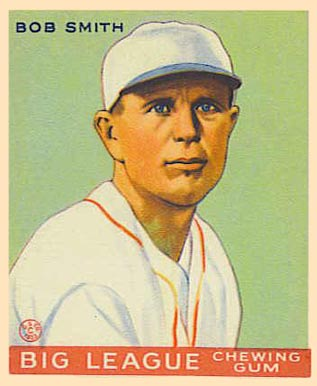
- Pitcher / Shortstop
- Born: April 22, 1895; Rogersville, Tennessee, U.S.
- Died: July 19, 1987 (aged 92); Waycross, Georgia, U.S.
- Batted: Right Threw: Right

MLB debut
- April 19, 1923, for the Boston Braves

Last MLB appearance
- August 6, 1937, for the Boston Bees

MLB statistics
- Win–loss record: 106–139
- Earned run average: 3.94
- Strikeouts: 618
- Stats at Baseball Reference

Teams
- Boston Braves (1923–1930); Chicago Cubs (1931–1932); Cincinnati Reds (1933); Boston Braves / Bees (1933–1937)

Robert Eldridge Smith (April 22, 1895 – July 19, 1987), was a Major League Baseball player. He began his major league career as an infielder, playing two and a half seasons at shortstop for the Boston Braves. Smith was a below-average hitter and fielder for that time, batting .240 with 2 home runs in 221 games in 1923 and 1924 combined. Overall, Smith batted .242 (409-for-1689) with 154 runs, 5 home runs, 166 RBI and 52 walks over 15 seasons.

Smith was converted into a pitcher during the 1925 season. Smith would go on to pitch 12 seasons in the majors for the Braves, Cincinnati Reds, and Chicago Cubs. During that time, he compiled over 100 major league wins. On May 17, 1927, he pitched all 22 innings in a marathon game as his Boston Braves were defeated by the Chicago Cubs, 4–3.
