= Pinky Whitney =

American baseball player (1905-1987)

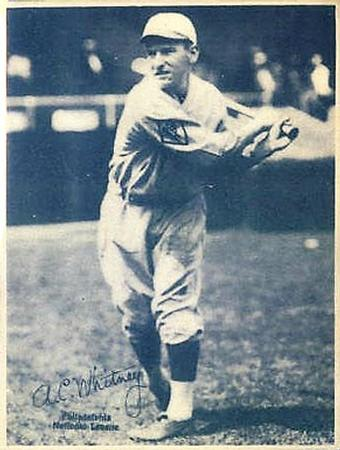
- Third baseman
- Born: January 2, 1905; San Antonio, Texas, U.S.
- Died: September 1, 1987 (aged 82); Center, Texas, U.S.
- Batted: Right Threw: Right

MLB debut
- April 11, 1928, for the Philadelphia Phillies

Last MLB appearance
- September 5, 1939, for the Philadelphia Phillies

MLB statistics
- Batting average: .295
- Home runs: 93
- Runs batted in: 927
- Stats at Baseball Reference

Teams
- Philadelphia Phillies (1928–1933); Boston Braves (1933–1936); Philadelphia Phillies (1936–1939)

Career highlights and awards
- All-Star (1936)

Arthur Carter Whitney (January 2, 1905 – September 1, 1987), born in San Antonio, Texas, was a third baseman for the Philadelphia Phillies (1928–1933 and 1936–1939) and Boston Braves/Bees (1933–1936).

Whitney made his debut on April 11, 1928, and played 151 games that year for the Phillies, leading the team with 103 runs batted in. Philadelphia would finish last, however, with 109 losses. In 1929, Whitney played in all 154 of his team's games, batting .327 and tallying a career-high 43 doubles and 295 total bases for the fifth-place Phillies.

Pinky had one of his best years in 1930, driving in 117 runs while achieving career bests in hits (207) and batting average (.342). The Phillies, however, would finish last again with 102 losses. Whitney's offensive numbers dipped in 1931, although he came back strong in 1932, playing in all 154 games and driving in a career-high 124 runs.

On June 17, 1933, he was traded to the Braves. He put up respectable numbers in Boston, even on the 1935 team that finished with the lowest winning percentage in National League history (.248).

Early into the 1936 season he was traded back to the Phillies, where he seemed to enjoy a resurgence, being named to the 1936 National League All-Star Team. That year, the Phillies would finish last with 100 losses.

Whitney had another strong season in 1937 when, at age 32, he hit .341 with a career-best .395 on-base percentage. However, injuries reduced his playing time and ended his career by 1939.

In 1539 games over 12 seasons, Whitney posted a .295 batting average (1701-for-5765) with 696 runs, 303 doubles, 56 triples, 93 home runs, 927 RBI, 45 stolen bases, 400 bases on balls, .343 on-base percentage and .415 slugging percentage. Defensively, he recorded an overall .964 fielding percentage.

Whitney died in Center, Texas at the age of 82.

== Sources ==
- Career statistics from Baseball Reference · Retrosheet · Baseball Almanac
