= Johnny Babich =

American baseball player (1913-2001)

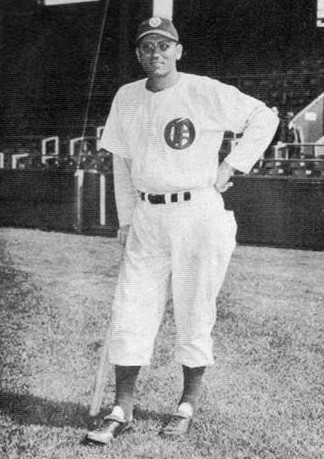
- Babich in 1948
- Pitcher
- Born: May 14, 1913; Albion, California, U.S.
- Died: January 19, 2001 (aged 87); Richmond, California, U.S.
- Batted: Right Threw: Right

MLB debut
- June 19, 1934, for the Brooklyn Dodgers

Last MLB appearance
- August 28, 1941, for the Philadelphia Athletics

MLB statistics
- Win–loss record: 30–45
- Earned run average: 4.93
- Strikeouts: 231
- Stats at Baseball Reference

Teams
- Brooklyn Dodgers (1934–1935); Boston Bees (1936); Philadelphia Athletics (1940–1941)

John Charles Babich (May 14, 1913 – January 19, 2001) was an American professional baseball pitcher. He played in Major League Baseball from 1934 to 1941 for the Brooklyn Dodgers, Boston Bees and Philadelphia Athletics. Babich was of Croatian descent.

Babich had his best season in 1940 with the Philadelphia Athletics when he went 14–13 with a 3.73 earned run average. The Athletics finished the year with a record of 54–100 and a team of ERA of 5.22. Babich also earned five victories against the New York Yankees that year, one of which took place on September 27 with New York riding an eight-game winning streak. The Yankees, going for their fifth consecutive American League pennant, finished two games out of first place.

Babich played his final professional season at the age of 32 for the 1945 Oakland Oaks of the Pacific Coast League and later coached on the team. In Charlie Metro's autobiography, he wrote this of his former Oaks coach: "Johnny Babich, who had pitched for the Athletics and the Dodgers, was a coach. I had a chance to talk to him about the slider or the 'nickel curve.' Supposedly he was the first big league pitcher to throw that pitch. They told me that he had a good one. He didn't last a long time, only five years, in the majors. But he taught that slider to a lot of pitchers. A couple of years later, I managed against him when he managed Idaho Falls in the Pioneer League."
