= Buck Jordan =

American baseball player (1907–1993)

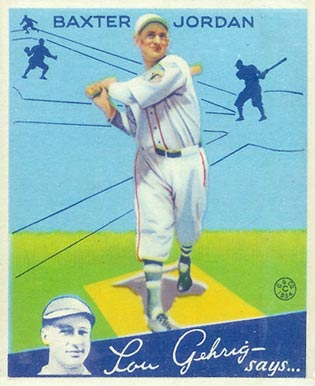
- 1934 Goudey baseball card
- First baseman
- Born: January 16, 1907; Cooleemee, North Carolina, U.S.
- Died: March 18, 1993 (aged 86); Salisbury, North Carolina, U.S.
- Batted: Left Threw: Right

MLB debut
- September 15, 1927, for the New York Giants

Last MLB appearance
- October 2, 1938, for the Philadelphia Phillies

MLB statistics
- Batting average: .299
- Home runs: 17
- Runs batted in: 281
- Stats at Baseball Reference

Teams
- New York Giants (1927, 1929); Washington Senators (1931); Boston Braves (1932–1937); Cincinnati Reds (1937–1938); Philadelphia Phillies (1938)

Baxter Byerly "Buck" Jordan (January 16, 1907 – March 18, 1993) was an American first baseman in Major League Baseball who played for the New York Giants (1927–1929), Washington Senators (1931), Boston Braves (1932–1937), Cincinnati Reds (1937–1938) and Philadelphia Phillies (1938). Jordan batted left-handed and threw right-handed. He was born in Cooleemee, North Carolina.

A solid defensive first baseman and basically a line-drive hitter, Jordan posted high batting averages in the minor leagues, but his lack of power made him nothing to be feared at the major league level. After playing in part of three seasons with the Giants and Senators, he became a regular with the Boston Braves in 1933 as he twice topped .300, with a career-high .323 in 1936. After that he averaged .290 in the next three seasons, that included stints with the Reds and Phillies. Twice he collected eight hits in a doubleheader, for the Braves in 1936 and with the Phillies in 1938.

In a ten-season career, Jordan was a .299 hitter with 17 home runs and 281 RBI in 811 games played.

Jordan died in Salisbury, North Carolina, at age 86.
