= Bill Lewis (baseball) =

American baseball player (1904–1977)

- Catcher
- Born: October 15, 1904; Ripley, Tennessee, U.S.
- Died: October 24, 1977 (aged 73); Memphis, Tennessee, U.S.
- Batted: Right Threw: Right

MLB debut
- June 3, 1933, for the St. Louis Cardinals

Last MLB appearance
- September 25, 1936, for the Boston Bees

MLB statistics
- Batting average: .327
- Home runs: 1
- Runs batted in: 11
- Stats at Baseball Reference

Teams
- St. Louis Cardinals (1933); Boston Braves/Bees (1935–36)

William Henry Lewis (October 15, 1904 – October 24, 1977) was an American Major League Baseball catcher. Nicknamed "Buddy", he played parts of three seasons in the majors; 1933 for the St. Louis Cardinals, and 1935 and 1936 for the Boston Braves (renamed the Bees in 1936).

Lewis had a much longer career in the minor leagues, playing nineteen seasons between 1924 and 1945. After his playing days ended, he spent the rest of his life as a scout, first for the St. Louis Cardinals and later for the New York Mets.
