= Swede Larsen =

American baseball player

- Second baseman
- Born: November 15, 1913; Jersey City, New Jersey
- Died: October 8, 2005 (aged 91); Tucson, Arizona
- Batted: Right Threw: Right

MLB debut
- June 17, 1936, for the Boston Bees

Last MLB appearance
- September 27, 1936, for the Boston Bees

MLB statistics
- Games played: 3
- At bats: 1
- Hits: 0
- Stats at Baseball Reference

Teams
- Boston Bees (1936)

Erling Adell "Swede" Larsen (November 15, 1913 – October 8, 2005) was a second baseman in Major League Baseball. He played for the Boston Bees in 1936.
