= Bob Brown (pitcher) =

American baseball player (1911-1990)

- Pitcher
- Born: April 1, 1911; Dorchester, Massachusetts, U.S.
- Died: August 3, 1990 (aged 79); Pembroke, Massachusetts, U.S.
- Batted: Right Threw: Right

MLB debut
- April 21, 1930, for the Boston Braves

Last MLB appearance
- May 3, 1936, for the Boston Bees

MLB statistics
- Win–loss record: 16–21
- Earned run average: 4.48
- Strikeouts: 159
- Stats at Baseball Reference

Teams
- Boston Braves / Bees (1930–1936)

Robert Murray Brown (April 1, 1911 – August 3, 1990) was an American professional baseball pitcher. He played all or part of seven seasons in Major League Baseball, from 1930 until 1936, all for the Boston Braves/Bees.

In 7 MLB seasons, Brown compiled a 16–21 win–loss record, striking out 159 and walking 193, with an ERA of 4.48.

Brown died August 3, 1990, aged 79.
