= Billy Urbanski =

American baseball player (1903-1973)

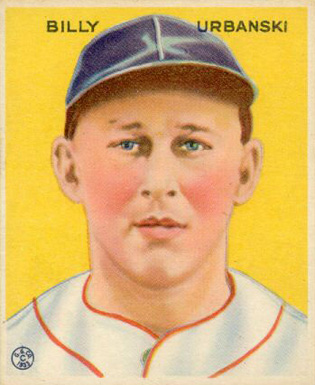
- Urbanski's 1933 Goudey baseball card
- Shortstop
- Born: June 5, 1903; Linoleumville, New York, U.S.
- Died: July 12, 1973 (aged 70); Perth Amboy, New Jersey, U.S.
- Batted: Right Threw: Right

MLB debut
- July 4, 1931, for the Boston Braves

Last MLB appearance
- April 23, 1937, for the Boston Braves

MLB statistics
- Batting average: .260
- Home runs: 19
- Runs batted in: 207
- Stats at Baseball Reference

Teams
- Boston Braves (1931–1937)

William Michael Urbanski (June 5, 1903 – July 12, 1973) was an American professional baseball player who played infield in the Major Leagues from 1931–1937. He would play for the Boston Braves.

It was sometimes mistakenly reported that Urbanski worked as a barber due to his having worked for the Barber Asphalt Company.
