= Joe Coscarart =

American baseball player (1909-1993)

- Goudey baseball card – 1936 Series, #08
- Infielder
- Born: November 18, 1909; Escondido, California, U.S.
- Died: April 5, 1993 (aged 83); Sequim, Washington, U.S.
- Batted: Right Threw: Right

MLB debut
- April 26, 1935, for the Boston Braves

Last MLB appearance
- September 27, 1936, for the Boston Braves

MLB statistics
- Batting average: .241
- Home runs: 3
- Runs batted in: 73

Teams
- Boston Braves/Boston Bees (1935–1936)

Joseph Marvin Coscarart (November 18, 1909 – April 5, 1993) was American professional baseball infielder in Major League Baseball (MLB) who played for the Boston Braves/Boston Bees from 1935 to 1936. Coscarart batted and threw right-handed. He was born in Escondido, California. His younger brother, Pete, was an infielder who played with the Brooklyn Dodgers and Pittsburgh Pirates (1938–1946).

In a two-season career, Coscarart posted a .241 batting average with three home runs and 73 RBI in 190 games played. In 1936, he set the MLB single-season record for the most times being caught stealing (11) without a successful stolen base.

In 1993, Coscarart died in Sequim, Washington, at the age of 83.
