= Ed Moriarty =

American baseball player (1912-1991)

- Second baseman / Pinch hitter
- Born: October 12, 1912; Holyoke, Massachusetts, U.S.
- Died: September 29, 1991 (aged 78); Holyoke, Massachusetts, U.S.
- Batted: Right Threw: Right

MLB debut
- June 21, 1935, for the Boston Braves

Last MLB appearance
- May 12, 1936, for the Boston Bees

MLB statistics
- Batting average: .300
- Home runs: 1
- Runs batted in: 1
- Stats at Baseball Reference

Teams
- Boston Braves / Bees (1935 – 1936)

Edward Jerome Moriarty (October 12, 1912 – September 29, 1991) was an American Major League Baseball player. He played two seasons with the Boston Braves and Bees from 1935 to 1936.
