= Pete Coscarart =

American baseball player (1913–2002)

- Second baseman / Shortstop
- Born: June 16, 1913; Escondido, California, U.S.
- Died: July 24, 2002 (aged 89); Escondido, California, U.S.
- Batted: Right Threw: Right

MLB debut
- April 26, 1938, for the Brooklyn Dodgers

Last MLB appearance
- May 17, 1946, for the Pittsburgh Pirates

MLB statistics
- Batting average: .243
- Home runs: 28
- Runs batted in: 269
- Stats at Baseball Reference

Teams
- Brooklyn Dodgers (1938–1941); Pittsburgh Pirates (1942–1946)

Career highlights and awards
- All-Star (1940)

Peter Joseph Coscarart (June 16, 1913 – July 24, 2002) was an American second baseman and shortstop in Major League Baseball who played from 1938 through 1946 for the Brooklyn Dodgers and Pittsburgh Pirates. Listed at 5' 11" ( 1.80 m), 175 lb. (79 k), Coscarart batted and threw right-handed. He was born in Escondido, California. His older brother, Joe Coscarart, was an infielder who played for the Boston Braves from 1935 to 1936.

Coscarart was a graduate of Escondido High School in California, where the baseball field was named after him. He later was signed by the Dodgers, becoming the first big leaguer coming out of San Diego State University.

== Professional career ==
Considered the top defensive second baseman in the National League in 1939, Coscarart finished that season with a .277 batting average, 22 doubles and 10 stolen bases. He followed with an All-Star Game appearance the next year, while hitting 24 doubles with career-highs in home runs (9), runs batted in (58) and games played (143).

Coscarart also was a member of the Brooklyn team that faced the New York Yankees in the 1941 World Series, but as his hitting declined, he was replaced by Billy Herman and then traded to the Pittsburgh Pirates before the 1942 season.

In his first year with Pittsburgh, Coscarart started at shortstop and switched to second base for the next three seasons. In 1944 he hit .264 with 30 doubles and 10 stolen bases in 139 games and also posted career-numbers in hits (146) and doubles (30). He then was named to the National League All-Star team but did not appear in the game.

== Late years ==
Following his baseball career, Coscarart scouted for the Minnesota Twins and the Yankees. While at Minnesota, he signed Graig Nettles. He later worked in real estate for 30 years.

In 1996, Coscarart was inducted into the Brooklyn Dodgers Hall of Fame. The same year, he joined Frank Crosetti, Dolph Camilli, Al Gionfriddo, and 72 other players from his era, in suing major league baseball for lost benefits and rights of players to receive royalties for use of their images and memorabilia without the players consent. "There's no way of proving it, but I've always felt I was cheated", Coscarart said in an interview with The San Diego Union-Tribune.

A few months later, Coscarart died in 2002 of an aneurysm in his home of Escondido, California at the age of 89.
