= Tommy Thompson (outfielder) =

American baseball player (1910–1971)

- Outfielder
- Born: May 19, 1910; Elkhart, Illinois, U.S.
- Died: May 24, 1971 (aged 61); Auburn, California, U.S.
- Batted: Left Threw: Right

MLB debut
- September 3, 1933, for the Boston Braves

Last MLB appearance
- June 9, 1939, for the St. Louis Browns

MLB statistics
- Batting average: .266
- Home runs: 9
- Runs batted in: 119
- Stats at Baseball Reference

Teams
- Boston Braves/Bees (1933–1936); Chicago White Sox (1938–1939); St. Louis Browns (1939)

Rupert Luckhart "Tommy" Thompson (May 19, 1910 – May 24, 1971) was an American professional baseball outfielder in Major League Baseball who played for the Boston Braves (1933–36), Chicago White Sox (1938–39), and St. Louis Browns (1939). He was born in Elkhart, Illinois and died in Auburn, California.

In total he played 22 seasons of professional baseball beginning with the Bloomington Bloomers of the Illinois–Indiana–Iowa League in 1928. His best season may have been with the San Diego Padres of the Pacific Coast League in 1945, when he had a batting average of .346. His last professional season was with the Pampa Oilers of the West Texas–New Mexico League in 1953.
