= Art Doll =

American baseball player (1913-1978)

- Pitcher / Catcher
- Born: May 7, 1913; Chicago, Illinois, U.S.
- Died: April 28, 1978 (aged 64); Calumet City, Illinois, U.S.
- Batted: Right Threw: Right

MLB debut
- September 21, 1935, for the Boston Braves

Last MLB appearance
- September 24, 1938, for the Boston Bees

MLB statistics
- Batting average: .154
- Home runs: 0
- Runs batted in: 0
- Win–loss record: 0–1
- Earned run average: 3.00
- Strikeouts: 3
- Stats at Baseball Reference

Teams
- Boston Braves / Bees (1935–1936, 1938)

Arthur James "Moose" Doll (May 7, 1913 – April 28, 1978) was an American Major League Baseball player. He played three seasons with the Boston Braves and Bees from 1935 to 1936 and 1938.

Doll made his MLB debut in 1935 as a catcher, but had switched to a pitcher in the next season. His only decision came on September 25, 1936, as the Bees lost to the New York Giants, 3–2, at Braves Field.

Doll served in the US Army during World War II.
