= Amby Murray =

American baseball player (1913-1997)

- Pitcher
- Born: June 4, 1913; Fall River, Massachusetts, U.S.
- Died: February 6, 1997 (aged 83); Port Salerno, Florida, U.S.
- Batted: Left Threw: Left

MLB debut
- July 5, 1936, for the Boston Bees

Last MLB appearance
- August 10, 1936, for the Boston Bees

MLB statistics
- Win–loss record: 0–0
- Earned run average: 4.09
- Strikeouts: 2
- Stats at Baseball Reference

Teams
- Boston Bees (1936)

Ambrose Joseph Murray (June 4, 1913 – February 6, 1997) was an American Major League Baseball pitcher. He played one season with the Boston Bees in 1936.
