= Ken Weafer =

American baseball player (1913-2005)

- Pitcher
- Born: February 6, 1913; Woburn, Massachusetts, U.S.
- Died: June 4, 2005 (aged 92); Guilderland, New York, U.S.
- Batted: Right Threw: Right

MLB debut
- May 29, 1936, for the Boston Bees

Last MLB appearance
- May 29, 1936, for the Boston Bees

MLB statistics
- Win–loss record: 0–0
- Earned run average: 12.00
- Strikeouts: 0
- Stats at Baseball Reference

Teams
- Boston Bees (1936)

Kenneth Albert Weafer (February 6, 1913 – June 4, 2005) was an American Major League Baseball pitcher who played in one game in 1936 with the Boston Bees. He batted and threw right-handed. On May 29, 1936, he pitched 3 innings in relief surrendering 6 hits, 4 earned runs, walking 3, and struck out none, as the Bees lost to the New York Giants at the Polo Grounds.

During World War II, Weafer served in the United States Navy.

Weafer was born in Woburn, Massachusetts, to Margaret E. Sullivan and Jeremiah F. Weafer (1862–1949), a barber, and died in Guilderland, New York. He is the brother of American League umpire Hal Weafer. He is also second cousin once removed to the South African artist Jeremy Wafer, and second cousin twice removed to English footballer Graham Knight.
