= Ben Cantwell =

American baseball player (1902-1962)

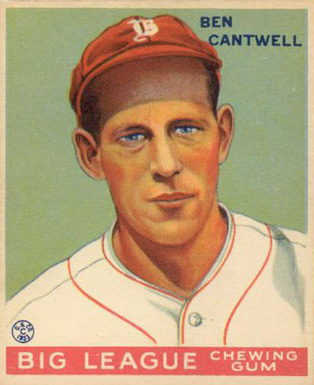
- Pitcher
- Born: April 13, 1902; Milan, Tennessee, U.S.
- Died: December 4, 1962 (aged 60); Salem, Missouri, U.S.
- Batted: Right Threw: Right

MLB debut
- August 19, 1927, for the New York Giants

Last MLB appearance
- September 23, 1937, for the Brooklyn Dodgers

MLB statistics
- Win–loss record: 76–108
- Earned run average: 3.91
- Strikeouts: 348
- Stats at Baseball Reference

Teams
- New York Giants (1927–1928); Boston Braves / Bees (1928–1936); New York Giants (1937); Brooklyn Dodgers (1937)

Benjamin Caldwell Cantwell (April 13, 1902 – December 4, 1962) was an American Major League Baseball pitcher from 1927 to 1937. He was born in Milan, Tennessee, and was a graduate of the University of Tennessee. He is the last MLB pitcher to lose 25 games in a single season (1935). He died, aged 60, in Salem, Missouri.
