= 1935 Brooklyn Dodgers season =

1935 Brooklyn Dodgers
- League: National League
- Ballpark: Ebbets Field
- City: Brooklyn, New York
- Record: 70–83 (.458)
- League place: 5th
- Owners: Stephen McKeever, Brooklyn Trust Company
- President: Stephen McKeever
- Managers: Casey Stengel

The 1935 Brooklyn Dodgers finished the season in fifth place, with their third straight losing season.

== Regular season ==
=== Season standings ===
National League
Team	W	L	Pct.	GB	Home	Road
Chicago Cubs	100	54	.649	—	56‍–‍21	44‍–‍33
St. Louis Cardinals	96	58	.623	4	53‍–‍24	43‍–‍34
New York Giants	91	62	.595	8½	50‍–‍27	41‍–‍35
Pittsburgh Pirates	86	67	.562	13½	46‍–‍31	40‍–‍36
Brooklyn Dodgers	70	83	.458	29½	38‍–‍38	32‍–‍45
Cincinnati Reds	68	85	.444	31½	41‍–‍35	27‍–‍50
Philadelphia Phillies	64	89	.418	35½	35‍–‍43	29‍–‍46
Boston Braves	38	115	.248	61½	25‍–‍50	13‍–‍65

=== Record vs. opponents ===
1935 National League record Sources:
Team	BSN	BRO	CHC	CIN	NYG	PHI	PIT	STL
Boston	—	6–16	3–19	10–12	5–16	8–14	2–20	4–18
Brooklyn	16–6	—	5–17	11–11	9–13	12–9–1	11–11	6–16
Chicago	19–3	17–5	—	14–8	14–8	13–9	15–7	8–14
Cincinnati	12–10	11–11	8–14	—	8–14–1	13–9	8–13	8–14
New York	16–5	13–9	8–14	14–8–1	—	12–10–2	14–8	14–8
Philadelphia	14–8	9–12–1	9–13	9–13	10–12–2	—	6–16	7–15
Pittsburgh	20–2	11–11	7–15	13–8	8–14	16–6	—	11–11
St. Louis	18–4	16–6	14–8	14–8	8–14	15–7	11–11	—

=== Notable transactions ===
- May 15, 1935: George Earnshaw was purchased by the Dodgers from the Chicago White Sox.

=== Roster ===
1935 Brooklyn Dodgers
Roster
Pitchers: 26 Johnny Babich; 15 Tom Baker; 30 Bob Barr; 28 Ray Benge; 17 Watty Clark; 7 George Earnshaw; 20 Harry Eisenstat; 29 Harvey Green; 14 Frank Lamanske; 27 Dutch Leonard; 15 Bob Logan; 16 Van Mungo; 25 Les Munns; 21 Dazzy Vance; 34 Tom Zachary	Catchers: 10 Al López; 19 Babe Phelps; -- Whitey Ock; 22 Ralph Onis; 20 Zack Taylor; Infielders: 2 Jim Bucher; 5 Tony Cuccinello; -- Rod Dedeaux; 8 Lonny Frey; 12 Jimmy Jordan; 6 Sam Leslie; 23 Johnny McCarthy; 22 Vince Sherlock; 14 Frank Skaff; 3 Joe Stripp	Outfielders: 4 Frenchy Bordagaray; 1 Buzz Boyle; 5 Johnny Cooney; 18 Len Koenecke; 21 Buster Mills; 24 Bobby Reis; 9 Danny Taylor; 11 Nick Tremark	Manager: 31 Casey Stengel; Coaches: 32 Otto Miller; 20 Zack Taylor

== Player stats ==
=== Batting ===
==== Starters by position ====
Note: Pos = Position; G = Games played; AB = At bats; H = Hits; Avg. = Batting average; HR = Home runs; RBI = Runs batted in

Pos	Player	G	AB	H	Avg.	HR	RBI
C	Al López	128	379	95	.251	3	39
1B	Sam Leslie	142	520	160	.308	5	93
2B	Tony Cuccinello	102	360	105	.292	8	53
3B	Joe Stripp	109	373	114	.306	3	43
SS	Lonny Frey	131	515	135	.262	11	77
OF	Buzz Boyle	127	475	129	.272	4	44
OF	Frenchy Bordagaray	120	422	119	.282	1	39
OF	Danny Taylor	112	352	102	.290	7	59

==== Other batters ====
Note: G = Games played; AB = At bats; H = Hits; Avg. = Batting average; HR = Home runs; RBI = Runs batted in

Player	G	AB	H	Avg.	HR	RBI
Jim Bucher	123	473	143	.302	7	58
Len Koenecke	100	325	92	.283	4	27
Jimmy Jordan	94	295	82	.278	0	30
Babe Phelps	47	121	44	.364	5	22
Bobby Reis	52	85	21	.247	0	4
Buster Mills	17	56	12	.214	1	7
Zack Taylor	26	54	7	.130	0	5
Johnny McCarthy	22	48	12	.250	0	4
Johnny Cooney	10	29	9	.310	0	1
Vince Sherlock	9	26	12	.462	0	6
Nick Tremark	10	13	3	.231	0	3
Frank Skaff	6	11	6	.545	0	3
Rod Dedeaux	2	4	1	.250	0	1
Whitey Ock	1	3	0	.000	0	0
Ralph Onis	1	1	1	1.000	0	0

=== Pitching ===
==== Starting pitchers ====
Note: G = Games pitched; IP = Innings pitched; W = Wins; L = Losses; ERA = Earned run average; SO = Strikeouts

Player	G	IP	W	L	ERA	SO
Van Mungo	37	214.1	16	10	3.65	143
Watty Clark	33	207.0	13	8	3.30	35
George Earnshaw	25	166.0	8	12	4.12	72
Tom Zachary	25	158.0	7	12	3.59	33
Ray Benge	23	124.2	9	9	4.48	39

==== Other pitchers ====
Note: G = Games pitched; IP = Innings pitched; W = Wins; L = Losses; ERA = Earned run average; SO = Strikeouts

Player	G	IP	W	L	ERA	SO
Johnny Babich	37	143.1	7	14	6.66	55
Dutch Leonard	43	137.2	2	9	3.92	41
Les Munns	21	58.1	1	3	5.55	13

==== Relief pitchers ====
Note: G = Games pitched; W = Wins; L = Losses; SV = Saves; ERA = Earned run average; SO = Strikeouts

Player	G	W	L	SV	ERA	SO
Dazzy Vance	20	3	2	2	4.41	28
Bobby Reis	14	3	2	2	2.83	7
Tom Baker	11	1	0	0	4.29	10
Harry Eisenstat	2	0	1	0	13.50	2
Frank Lamanske	2	0	0	0	7.36	1
Bob Logan	2	0	1	0	3.38	1
Bob Barr	2	0	0	0	3.86	0
Harvey Green	2	0	0	0	9.00	0

== Farm system ==
Level	Team	League	Manager
AA	Sacramento Senators	Pacific Coast League	Earl McNeely; Kittie Wirts
A	Reading Brooks/Allentown Brooks	New York–Pennsylvania League	Zack Taylor
C	Dayton Ducks	Middle Atlantic League	Riley Parker; Howard Holmes
