= Allentown Brooks =

- 1935–1936; Allentown, Pennsylvania

Minor league affiliations
- Previous classes: Class A (1935–1936)
- League: New York–Pennsylvania League (1935–1936)

Major league affiliations
- Previous teams: Brooklyn Dodgers (1935–1936)

Team data
- Previous names: Allentown Brooks (1935–1936); Reading Brooks (1935)
- Previous parks: Ballpark was known as "Fairgrounds Field"

The Allentown Brooks were a minor league baseball team that operated from 1935–1936. The nickname was derived from their parent team, the Brooklyn Dodgers. They played in the New York–Pennsylvania League and were based in Allentown, Pennsylvania. The ballclub was previously known as the Reading Brooks before moving to Allentown midway through the 1935 season, largely as a measure to reduce operating costs. In 1941 the Brooklyn Dodgers affiliate Reading Brooks played in the Inter-State League

== Team Records ==
=== Single Season ===
==== Hitting ====
- Batting Average – .379, Nick Tremark 1936
- Hits – 204, Nick Tremark 1936
- Doubles – 36, Nick Tremark 1936
- Triples – 22, Johnny Hudson 1936
- Home Runs – 7, Johnny McCarthy 1935
- At Bats – 538, Nick Tremark 1936
- Games Played – 141, Nick Tremark 1936

==== Pitching ====
- Wins – 19, Harry Eisenstat 1936
- Losses – 15, Bob Barr 1936
- ERA – 2.96, Walter Signer 1936
- Appearances – 45, Jake Houtekamer 1935
- Innings Pitched – 257.0, Harry Eisenstat 1936

=== Career ===
==== Hitting ====
- Hits – 368, Nick Tremark
- Doubles – 69, Nick Tremark
- Triples – 24, Nick Tremark
- Home Runs – 7, Johnny McCarthy
- At-Bats – 1031, Nick Tremark
- Games Played – 277, Nick Tremark

==== Pitching ====
- Wins – 19, Harry Eisenstat
- Losses – 17, Harvey Green
- Appearances – 74, Jake Houtekamer
- Innings Pitched – 257.0, Harry Eisenstat

== Major League Alumni ==
The Brooks had many players that went on to Major League Baseball playing time to varying degrees of success. The 1935 Brooks featured 10 players that would reach the Major Leagues and five players that had already accumulated Major League service time for a total of 15 players that had already reached or would reach the Major Leagues out of 43 players that played for the Brooks that year. The 1936 Brooks had 19 players that had either already reached or would reach the Major Leagues out of the 35 players that played for the Brooks.

=== Pitchers ===
- RHP Bob Barr (1936)
- RHP Charlie Eckert (1935–1936)
- LHP Harry Eisenstat (1936)
- RHP John Gaddy (1936)
- RHP Harvey Green (1935–1936)
- RHP Bob Katz (1935)
- LHP Frank Lamanske (1935)
- RHP Walter Signer (1935–1936)
- LHP Dick Stone (1936)
- RHP Hank Winston (1936)

=== Catchers ===
- Zack Taylor (1935)
- Ralph Onis (1935–1936)

=== Infielders ===
- 2B Bill Adair (1936)
- 2B George Fallon (1935–1936)
- 2B Ben Geraghty (1936)
- SS Johnny Hudson (1936)
- 1B Johnny McCarthy (1935)
- SS Jack Radtke (1935–1936)
- 3B Al Reiss (1936)
- 3B Woody Williams (1936)

=== Outfielders ===
- Walt Bashore (1935–1936)
- George Cisar (1936)
- Art Parks (1936)
- Frank Skaff (1935)
- Nick Tremark (1935–1936)
- Eddie Wilson (1936)
