= 1937 in baseball =

The following are the baseball events of the year 1937 throughout the world.

== Champions ==
=== Major League Baseball ===
- World Series: New York Yankees over New York Giants (4–1)
- All-Star Game, July 7 at Griffith Stadium: American League, 8–3

=== Other champions ===
- Negro League Baseball All-Star Game: East, 7–2

== Awards and honors ==
- Baseball Hall of Fame
  - Morgan Bulkeley
  - Ban Johnson
  - Nap Lajoie
  - Connie Mack
  - John McGraw
  - Tris Speaker
  - George Wright
  - Cy Young
- MLB Most Valuable Player Award
  - American League: Charlie Gehringer, Detroit Tigers, 2B
  - National League: Joe Medwick, St. Louis Cardinals, OF
- The Sporting News Player of the Year Award
  - Johnny Allen, Cleveland Indians
- The Sporting News Manager of the Year Award
  - Bill McKechnie, Boston Bees

== Statistical leaders ==
	American League		National League		Negro American League		Negro National League	
Stat	Player	Total	Player	Total	Player	Total	Player	Total
AVG	Charlie Gehringer (DET)	.371	Joe Medwick^{2} (STL)	.374	Bill Carter (SLS/BBB)	.390	Josh Gibson^{3} (HOM)	.417
HR	Joe DiMaggio (NYY)	46	Joe Medwick^{2} (STL); Mel Ott (NYG)	31	Willard Brown (KCM)	10	Josh Gibson^{3} (HOM)	20
RBI	Hank Greenberg (DET)	184	Joe Medwick^{2} (STL)	154	Willard Brown (KCM)	60	Josh Gibson^{3} (HOM)	73
W	Lefty Gomez^{1} (NYY)	21	Carl Hubbell (NYG)	22	Hilton Smith (KCM/CAG)	11	Ray Brown (HOM)	11
ERA	Lefty Gomez^{1} (NYY)	2.33	Jim Turner (BSN)	2.38	Eugene Bremer (CT)	1.47	Roy Welmaker (HOM)	2.31
K	Lefty Gomez^{1} (NYY)	194	Carl Hubbell (NYG)	159	Hilton Smith (KCM/CAG)	99	Ray Brown (HOM)	74

^{1} American League Triple Crown pitching winner
^{2} National League Triple Crown batting winner
^{3} Negro National League Triple Crown batting winner

== Major league baseball final standings ==
=== American League final standings ===
American League
Team	W	L	Pct.	GB	Home	Road
New York Yankees	102	52	.662	—	57‍–‍20	45‍–‍32
Detroit Tigers	89	65	.578	13	49‍–‍28	40‍–‍37
Chicago White Sox	86	68	.558	16	47‍–‍30	39‍–‍38
Cleveland Indians	83	71	.539	19	50‍–‍28	33‍–‍43
Boston Red Sox	80	72	.526	21	44‍–‍29	36‍–‍43
Washington Senators	73	80	.477	28½	43‍–‍35	30‍–‍45
Philadelphia Athletics	54	97	.358	46½	27‍–‍50	27‍–‍47
St. Louis Browns	46	108	.299	56	25‍–‍51	21‍–‍57

Locations of teams for the 1934–1939 American League seasons
American League

=== National League final standings ===
National League
Team	W	L	Pct.	GB	Home	Road
New York Giants	95	57	.625	—	50‍–‍25	45‍–‍32
Chicago Cubs	93	61	.604	3	46‍–‍32	47‍–‍29
Pittsburgh Pirates	86	68	.558	10	46‍–‍32	40‍–‍36
St. Louis Cardinals	81	73	.526	15	45‍–‍33	36‍–‍40
Boston Bees	79	73	.520	16	43‍–‍33	36‍–‍40
Brooklyn Dodgers	62	91	.405	33½	36‍–‍39	26‍–‍52
Philadelphia Phillies	61	92	.399	34½	29‍–‍45	32‍–‍47
Cincinnati Reds	56	98	.364	40	28‍–‍51	28‍–‍47

Locations of teams for the 1936–1937 National League seasons
National League

== Negro leagues final standings ==
All Negro leagues standings below are per Seamheads.

=== Negro American League final standings ===
vs. Negro American League						vs. Major Black teams			
Negro American League	W	L	T	Pct.	GB	W	L	T	Pct.
^{(1)} Kansas City Monarchs	52	18	1	.739	—	55	22	1	.712
Cincinnati Tigers	34	20	1	.627	10	44	27	2	.616
^{(2)} Chicago American Giants	35	23	1	.602	11	39	38	1	.506
Indianapolis Athletics	17	21	1	.449	19	17	21	1	.449
Birmingham Black Barons	16	23	0	.410	20½	19	26	0	.422
Detroit Stars	15	24	0	.385	21½	15	25	0	.375
Memphis Red Sox	14	28	0	.333	24	15	31	0	.326
St. Louis Stars	5	31	0	.139	30	6	33	0	.154

^{(1)} First half champion ^{(2)} Second half champion

Locations of teams for the 1937 Negro American League season
Negro American League

- Kansas City awarded first-half championship, but Chicago American Giants had better record and disputed it.
- Detroit and St. Louis both serve as charter members of the League but also disband their teams after the season ends

=== Negro National League final standings ===
vs. Negro National League						vs. Major Black teams			
Negro National League	W	L	T	Pct.	GB	W	L	T	Pct.
Homestead Grays	41	17	0	.703	—	60	19	1	.756
Newark Eagles	36	22	2	.617	6½	36	22	2	.617
Philadelphia Stars	27	31	1	.466	15½	30	32	1	.484
Washington Elite Giants	24	34	3	.418	19	24	37	4	.400
New York Black Yankees	21	31	2	.407	18	23	33	2	.414
Pittsburgh Crawfords	18	32	0	.363	22	22	39	1	.363

Locations of teams for the 1937 Negro National League season
Negro National League

=== Independent teams final standings ===
A loose confederation of teams existed that were not part of either established leagues.

vs. All Teams
Independent Clubs	W	L	T	Pct.	GB
Brooklyn Royal Giants	2	0	1	.833	—
Santo Domingo Stars	4	2	0	.667	—
Atlanta Black Crackers	10	8	0	.556	—
Jacksonville Red Caps	4	6	0	.400	2
NNL All Stars	2	3	0	.400	1½
Cuban Stars (East)	1	4	1	.250	2½

== Events ==
=== January–June ===
- January 5 – The New York Giants release shortstop Travis Jackson, who had played fifteen seasons with the team.
- January 6 – The New York Giants acquire infielder Tommy Thevenow from the Cincinnati Reds. Thevenow never plays a game for the Giants due to a trade months later to the Boston Bees for shortstop Billy Urbanski, who opts to retire instead (incidentally, his last plate appearance as a player was against the Giants).
- January 17 – The St. Louis Browns trade Ivy Andrews, Lyn Lary and Moose Solters to the Cleveland Indians for Oral Hildebrand, Bill Knickerbocker and Joe Vosmik.
- January 19 – Cy Young, Tris Speaker, and Nap Lajoie are elected to the Hall of Fame in Cooperstown, set to open in the next two years.
- January 27 – A flood strikes the city of Cincinnati that causes Mill Creek to overflow its banks. The flood affects Crosley Field by submerging parts of it under twenty feet of water.
- February 4 – The Philadelphia Athletics sign free agent Ace Parker, a future member of the Pro Football Hall of Fame.
- February 17 – The New York Yankees purchase the contract of first baseman Babe Dahlgren from the Boston Red Sox. Dahlgren would later be best remembered for replacing Lou Gehrig at first base, ending the iron man's consecutive playing streak.
- March 20 – The Homestead Grays acquire Josh Gibson and Judy Johnson from the Pittsburgh Crawfords in exchange for Lloyd Bassett and Henry Spearman, along with $2,500 in cash. Johnson and Gibson would go on to become two of the top attractions in the Negro leagues and would be among the first Negro league players inducted in the Baseball Hall of Fame.
- April 4 – The Washington Senators purchase Al Simmons and his contract from the Detroit Tigers for $15,000.
- April 19 – On Opening Day, the Philadelphia Phillies sweep the Boston Bees in a double header, and the Philadelphia Athletics defeat the Washington Senators, 4–3, in the only games on the schedule.
  - Vince DiMaggio makes his MLB debut, going 1-for-4 for the Philadelphia Phillies in a 2–1 loss to the Boston Bees.
- April 20 – In the Boston Red Sox's 11–5 victory over the Philadelphia A's, Bobby Doerr makes his major league debut at second base, going three-for-five with a run scored.
  - Gee Walker becomes the first player to hit for a cycle on opening day when he accomplishes the feat for the Detroit Tigers in their 4–3 win over the Cleveland Indians.
- April 22 – Johnny Vander Meer makes his MLB debut not as a pitcher, but as a pitch runner for the Cincinnati Reds in their 14–11 loss to the St. Louis Cardinals.
- April 25 – Cliff Melton of the New York Giants becomes the first rookie pitcher to strike out at least ten batters in his major league debut, having thirteen. It wasn't enough however, as the Giants dropped the game to the Boston Bees 3–1. The record would stand until 1954.
- May 3 – The New York Giants play an entire nine inning game with the Boston Bees without a single chance for their outfielders. The Bees outfield only had three chances themselves. Boston wins the game by a final score of 3–1.
- May 6 – Fans watching the Dodgers at Ebbets Field and the Giants at the Polo Grounds are treated to the sight of the Hindenburg as the zeppelin flew over both stadiums. Hours later, the Zeppelin explodes on a landing strip in Lakehurst, New Jersey, killing all 36 people on board.
- May 7 – Spud Chandler makes his MLB debut for the New York Yankees, appearing as a relief pitcher in the Yankees 12–6 loss to the Detroit Tigers.
- May 9 – In the Cincinnati Reds' 21–10 victory over the Philadelphia Phillies, Reds catcher Ernie Lombardi ties the modern Major League record with six hits in six consecutive times at bat. Pitcher Peaches Davis gives up ten hits, but pitches a complete game for the Reds.
- May 10 – Monte Pearson pitches a one hitter in the 6–0 New York Yankees victory over the Chicago White Sox at Comiskey Park. Joe DiMaggio hits his first two home runs of the season while George Selkirk connects his fifth homer. The only hit for Chicago is a one-out, first-inning single by Larry Rosenthal, who is erased on a double play. Pearson faces 28 batters, one more than the complete game minimum, striking out four and walking two.
- May 19 – In a pitchers' duel between St. Louis Cardinals' Dizzy Dean and New York Giants' Carl Hubbell, Dean is called for a balk in the sixth inning, resulting in a run for the Giants. Enraged, Dean begins throwing at New York batters, hitting Johnny McCarthy and inciting a bench-clearing brawl. Dean is fined $50.
- May 25 – Detroit Tigers player/manager Mickey Cochrane hits a third-inning home run to tie the ballgame with the New York Yankees, 1–1. In his next at-bat, Yankees pitcher Bump Hadley strikes Cochrane on the left side of the head with a fastball, ending his playing career. Del Baker assumes managerial duties, as Cochrane does not return to the helm until 1938. The Yankees win the game, 4–3.
- May 27 – The New York Giants' Mel Ott's ninth-inning home run helps Carl Hubbell win a record 24th straight game in a 3–2 win over the Cincinnati Reds at Crosley Field.
- June 1 – Bill Dietrich pitches a no-hitter in an 8–0 Chicago White Sox victory over the St. Louis Browns.
- June 4 – Gus Suhr of the Pittsburgh Pirates establishes a National League Record when he plays in his 822nd game. The streak ends the next day when he removes himself from the line-up to attend the funeral of his mother.
- June 8 – The Chicago White Sox defeat the New York Yankees 5–4, completing a ten-game winning streak, and moving into a first place tie with the Yankees.
- June 11 – The Boston Red Sox trade brothers Rick and Wes Ferrell, along with Mel Almada, to the Washington Senators for Ben Chapman and Bobo Newsom.
- June 12 – The Pittsburgh Pirates sell Waite Hoyt's contract to the Brooklyn Dodgers.
- June 15 – The New York Giants obtain Wally Berger from the Boston Bees for Frank Gabler and $35,000.
- June 25 – Augie Galan becomes the first player in the history of the National League to hit a home run from each side of the plate in the same game. The homers come at the expense of opposing pitchers Freddie Fitzsimmons and Ralph Birkofer of the Brooklyn Dodgers as the Chicago Cubs win 11–2.

=== July–September ===
- July 7 – The American League defeats the National League, 8–3, in the All-Star Game, held at Griffith Stadium, home of the Washington Senators.
- July 9 – The Detroit Tigers claim Charlie Gelbert off waivers from the Cincinnati Reds.
- July 15 – Philadelphia Athletics pitcher George Caster holds the Chicago White Sox to just four hits as the Athletics beat the White Sox 2–1, snapping a fifteen-game losing streak.
- July 25 – Washington Senators leadoff hitter Mel Almada ties a major league record by scoring five runs in the second game of a double header with the St. Louis Browns. He scored four runs in the first game, giving him nine for the day.
- August 3 – St. Louis Cardinals catcher Mickey Owen pulls off an unassisted double play in the 5–2 victory over the Boston Bees at Sportsman's Park.
- August 8 – John Whitehead and the Chicago White Sox shut out the Boston Red Sox 13–0 in the second game of a double header to end Boston's twelve-game winning streak (excluding one tie on August 1).
- August 14 – The Detroit Tigers score 34 runs in a double header with the St. Louis Browns.
- August 17 – The St. Louis Cardinals defeat the Cincinnati Reds 8–6 in a lengthy game that went nine innings but ended two minutes after midnight, making it the first game in major league history to end after midnight.
- August 27 – Dodgers pitcher Fred Frankhouse pitches seven innings of no-hit ball versus Cincinnati. However, the game is called on account of rain. While recognized as a no-hitter at the time, it becomes one of many no hitters struck from the record books in 1991 when MLB redefines a no-hitter as being a game in which a pitcher goes nine or more innings without giving up a hit.
- August 31 – Rookie Rudy York of the Detroit Tigers hits two home runs in a game, giving him 18 in total for the month of August. This breaks the previous record held by Babe Ruth, which was set in September of 1927.
- September 2 – Boze Berger, Mike Kreevich, and Dixie Walker each homer, with Berger hitting two, as the Chicago White Sox defeat the Boston Red Sox 4–0, with all four White Sox runs coming via the home run.
- September 11 – The St. Louis Browns win the second game of a double header with the Cleveland Indians, 8–3, to snap a twelve-game losing streak.
- September 22 – The St. Louis Browns lose 4–1 to the New York Yankees for their 100th loss of the season.
- September 29 – After scoring fifteen runs in the first game of a double header, the New York Yankees manage just one hit off Philadelphia Athletics pitcher Eddie Smith in the second game, losing 3–0. It is only the second time all season the Yankees are shut out (May 8).
- September 30 – The Boston Bees sweep a double header from the Dodgers to bring Brooklyn's losing streak to fourteen games.

=== October–December ===
- October 3 – On the final day of the season, the Cincinnati Reds are swept in a double header by the Pittsburgh Pirates to end the season with a fourteen-game losing streak.
  - The Detroit Tigers release outfielder Goose Goslin.
- October 4 – The Brooklyn Dodgers trade Jim Bucher, Johnny Cooney, Roy Henshaw and Joe Stripp to the St. Louis Cardinals for Leo Durocher.
  - The Cincinnati Reds release Kiki Cuyler.
- October 5 – The St. Louis Browns draft George McQuinn from the New York Yankees as part of the Rule 5 draft.
- October 6 – Having gotten just one hit, the New York Yankees finally get to Carl Hubbell in the sixth inning. Joe DiMaggio's single with the bases loaded drives in two, as the Yankees go on to score seven runs that inning. Lefty Gomez, meanwhile, gives up just one run to carry the Yankees to an 8–1 victory in Game one of the rematch of the 1936 World Series.
- October 7 – The Yankees win game two of the 1937 World Series by the same score, 8–1. Red Ruffing is the winning pitcher, and goes two-for-four with a double and three runs batted in.
- October 8 – For the third game in a row, Yankees pitching gives up just one run, as Monte Pearson pitches the Yankees to a 5–1 victory in game three.
- October 9 – On the brink of elimination, New York Giants bats finally erupt, as they score six runs in the second inning on their way to a 7–3 victory in game four of the World Series.
- October 10 – The New York Yankees defeat the New York Giants, 4–2, in Game five of the World Series to win their Major-League-record sixth World Championship, four game to one. The Yankees had been tied with the Philadelphia Athletics and Boston Red Sox for most championships (they each had five). By the time either of those teams won their next Series, the Yankees had far outdistanced them, with 20 wins as of 1972, and 26 wins as of 2004, respectively.
- October 15 – The New York Yankees release Tony Lazzeri, one of the last members of the famous "Murderers' Row" players on the roster.
- October 28 – Tony Lazzeri joins the Chicago Cubs.
- November 2 – American League batting champion Charlie Gehringer of the Detroit Tigers is named Most Valuable Player, receiving 78 out of a possible 80 points. Joe DiMaggio of the New York Yankees is a close second four points behind while Gehringer teammate Hank Greenberg, who collected 183 RBI, is a distant third. Gehringer also becomes the third Detroit player in four years to receive MVP honors.
- November 9 – St. Louis Cardinals Triple Crown winner Joe Medwick is named National League Most Valuable Player by the Baseball Writers' Association of America.
- December 2
  - The Detroit Tigers trade Marv Owen, Mike Tresh and Gee Walker to the Chicago White Sox for Vern Kennedy, Tony Piet and Dixie Walker.
  - The St. Louis Browns trade Joe Vosmik to the Boston Red Sox for Red Kress, Buster Mills and Bobo Newsom.
- December 6 – The Boston Red Sox acquired the contract of nineteen-year-old Ted Williams.
- December 7 – The Red Sox begin to complete the deal with San Diego of the Pacific Coast league by sending cash, along with Dom Dallessandro, Al Niemiec to the Padres. The deal is officially considered complete when Boston sends Spence Harris to San Diego.

== Births ==
=== January ===
- January 8 – Don Dillard
- January 10 – Jim O'Toole
- January 11 – Jack Curtis
- January 12 – Phil Mudrock
- January 14 – Sonny Siebert
- January 15 – Bob Sadowski
- January 16 – Moe Morhardt
- January 21 – Bill Graham

=== February ===
- February 2 – Don Buford
- February 7 – Juan Pizarro
- February 9 – Clete Boyer
- February 12 – Stan Johnson
- February 18 – Cananea Reyes
- February 21 – Ted Savage
- February 27 – Carl Warwick

=== March ===
- March 8 – Jim Small
- March 20 – Kenny Kuhn
- March 21 – Dave Thies
- March 24:
  - Dick Egan
  - Bob Tillman

=== April ===
- April 2 – Dick Radatz
- April 4:
  - Gary Geiger
  - Al Kenders
- April 5 – Roger Marquis
- April 6 – Phil Regan
- April 10 – Fritz Ackley
- April 17 – Roberto Peña
- April 21:
  - Bill Haywood
  - Gary Peters
- April 23 – Duke Carmel

=== May ===
- May 7 – Claude Raymond
- May 8:
  - Mike Cuellar
  - Art López
- May 10 – Jim Hickman
- May 18 – Brooks Robinson
- May 20 – Bob Giallombardo
- May 22 – George Spriggs

=== June ===
- June 3 – Phyllis Baker
- June 4 – Dolly Vanderlip
- June 8 – Joe Grzenda
- June 9 – Jake Jacobs
- June 10 – Kazuhisa Inao
- June 14 – John Weekly
- June 19 – Larry Miller
- June 22:
  - Jim O'Rourke
  - Jake Wood
- June 23 – Tom Haller
- June 24 – Jim Campbell
- June 27 – Peggy Cramer
- June 28:
  - Cal Emery
  - Ron Luciano

=== July ===
- July 1 – Ron Nischwitz
- July 2 – Dick Berardino
- July 4 – Gordon Seyfried
- July 7 – George Smith
- July 9:
  - Gordon Mackenzie
  - Marty Springstead
- July 10 – Larry Burright
- July 11 – Verle Tiefenthaler
- July 16 – Lee Elia
- July 23 – Dean Look
- July 26 – Pete Ward
- July 31 – Fred Van Dusen

=== August ===
- August 4 – Frank Kostro
- August 5:
  - Bill Pleis
  - Dwight Siebler
- August 6:
  - Cam Carreon
  - Joe Schaffernoth
  - Wayne Schurr
- August 9 – Ray Blemker
- August 14:
  - Bert Cueto
  - Joe Horlen
- August 17 – Diego Seguí
- August 19 – Jim Lehew
- August 21 – Jack Damaska
- August 22 – Pat Gillick
- August 25 – Choo-Choo Coleman
- August 28 – Bob Hartman
- August 29 – Hal Stowe
- August 31 – Tracy Stallard

=== September ===
- September 2 – Peter Ueberroth
- September 5 – Karl Kuehl
- September 15 – Charley Smith
- September 17 – Orlando Cepeda
- September 19 – Chris Short

=== October ===
- October 1 – Alan Brice
- October 10 – Gordie Sundin
- October 13 – Lou Clinton
- October 19 – Walt Bond
- October 20 – Juan Marichal
- October 23:
  - Bob Allen
  - Cecil Butler
- October 24 – John Goetz
- October 25 – Chuck Schilling
- October 31 – Dave Tyriver

=== November ===
- November 8 – Rex Johnston
- November 11 – Dave Hill
- November 14 – Jim Brewer
- November 15:
  - Bob Farley
  - Ray Webster
- November 21 – Tony Balsamo
- November 26 – Bob Lee
- November 27 – Bill Short
- November 28:
  - Purnal Goldy
  - Corky Withrow
- November 29 – George Thomas

=== December ===
- December 6 – Freddie Velázquez
- December 8 – Jim Pagliaroni
- December 12 – Pedro González
- December 13 – Ron Taylor
- December 22:
  - Tony Curry
  - Charlie James
- December 23 – Tim Harkness
- December 24 – Larry Foster
- December 27 – Bobby Klaus
- December 29 – George Perez

== Deaths ==
=== January ===
- January 5 – Ben Beville, 59, pitcher/first baseman and an original member of the Boston Americans club during the American League's inaugural season of 1901.
- January 9 – Doc Kerr, 54, backup catcher who played from 1914 to 1915 for the Pittsburgh Rebels and Baltimore Terrapins of the Federal League.
- January 12 – Joe McCarthy, 55, catcher for the New York Highlanders in 1905 and the St. Louis Cardinals in 1906.
- January 14 – Ed Trumbull, 76, outfielder/pitcher for the 1884 Washington Nationals.
- January 15:
  - Charlie Baker, 81, outfielder for the 1884 Chicago/Pittsburgh club of the Union Association.
  - Eddie Foster, 49, third baseman who played with the New York Highlanders, Washington Senators, Boston Red Sox and St. Louis Browns in a span of 13 seasons from 1910 to 1923.
- January 18 – Michael H. Sexton, 73, president of the Minor Leagues from 1909 through 1931, during which time the minors expanded to record size and success, peaking with 47 leagues.
- January 29 – George Fisher, 81, versatile utility man who played at five different positions for the Cleveland Blues and Wilmington Quicksteps in 1884.

=== February ===
- February 2 – Frank York, 59, Brooklyn attorney who served as president of the Robins/Dodgers from 1930 to 1932.
- February 4 – Harry Wolverton, 63, third baseman for the Chicago Orphans, Philadelphia Phillies, Washington Senators and Boston Beaneaters from 1898 through 1905, and later a player/manager for the New York Highlanders in 1912.
- February 5 – Al Bradley, 80, outfielder for the 1884 Washington Nationals.
- February 7:
  - Charlie Bell, 68, pitcher who played with the Kansas City Cowboys in 1889, and for the Louisville Colonels and Cincinnati Kelly's Killers in 1891.
  - Jim Miller, 56, backup infielder for the New York Giants in 1901.
- February 25 – George Darby, 68, pitcher who played with the Cincinnati Reds in 1893.
- February 26 – Ernie Lush, 51, backup outfielder for the St. Louis Cardinals in 1910.

=== March ===
- March 1:
  - Nig Fuller, 58, backup catcher for the Brooklyn Superbas during the 1902 season.
  - Roy Vaughn, 25, pitcher for the 1934 Philadelphia Athletics.
- March 7 – Lady Baldwin, 77, pitcher for the Milwaukee Brewers, Detroit Wolverines, Brooklyn Bridegrooms, and Buffalo Bisons during six seasons spanning 1890–1890, who led the National League with 42 wins and 323 strikeouts in 1886, while setting a Major League record for the most wins in a single season by a left-hander, which still stands today.
- March 14 – Rudy Kling, 66, shortstop for the St. Louis Cardinals in 1902.
- March 19 – Otto Williams, 59, shortstop who played from 1902 through 1904 with the St. Louis Cardinals and Chicago Cubs, and for the Washington Senators in 1906.
- March 25 – Billy Murray, 72, manager of the 1907–1909 Philadelphia Phillies, guiding them to a 240–214 record and two first-division finishes; former outfielder who compiled a .585 winning percentage as a minor-league pilot between 1889 and 1906.
- March 26 – Jerry Nops, 61, pitcher who played from 1896 to 1900 for the Philadelphia Phillies, Baltimore Orioles and Brooklyn Superbas of the National League, and for the Baltimore Orioles of the American League in 1901.
- March 29 – Bill White, 76, first baseman for the 1879 Providence Grays.

=== April ===
- April 4 – Earl Howard, 40, pitcher for the 1918 St. Louis Cardinals.
- April 12 – Ed Morris, 74, pitcher who played from 1884 through 1890 with the Columbus Buckeyes, Pittsburgh Alleghenys and Pittsburgh Burghers.
- April 17 – Bill Foxen, 57, pitcher who played from 1908 to 1911 for the Chicago Cubs and Philadelphia Phillies.
- April 14 – Ned Hanlon, 79, Hall of Fame player and masterful manager known by pioneering strategies such as the hit-and-run, who led the Baltimore Orioles teams which won three consecutive National League pennants from 1894 to 1896, and later guided the Brooklyn teams to league titles in 1899 and 1900, while compiling a World Series title with the 1887 Detroit Wolverines as their player-captain and a career managerial record of 1,313–1,164 (.530).
- April 15 – Emmett McCann, 35, shortstop who played from 1920 to 1921 with the Philadelphia Athletics and for the Boston Red Sox in 1926.
- April 18 – Hick Carpenter, 81, third baseman for five teams in a span of 12 seasons from 1879 to 1892, and a member of the 1882 American Association champions Cincinnati Red Stockings.
- April 19 – Sam Nicholl, 67, pitcher for the Pittsburgh Alleghenys in 1888 and the Columbus Solons in 1890.
- April 25 – George Gilham, 37, backup catcher for the St. Louis Cardinals in the 1920 and 1921 seasons.

=== May ===
- May 8 – Al Yeargin, 35, pitcher for the Boston Braves in the 1922 and 1924 seasons.
- May 11 – Nick Scharf, 78, outfielder who played from 1882 to 1883 for the Baltimore Orioles.
- May 18 – Doc Leitner, 71, pitcher for the Indianapolis Hoosiers in 1887.
- May 21 – Jack McAdams, 50, pitcher who played in 1911 with the St. Louis Cardinals.
- May 22 – Hi Jasper, 50, pitcher who played for the Chicago White Sox, St. Louis Cardinals and Cleveland Indians in a span of four seasons from 1914 to 1919.
- May 23 – Danny Clark, 43, infielder for the Detroit Tigers, Boston Red Sox and St. Louis Cardinals in three seasons between 1922 and 1927.
- May 27 – Frank Grant, 71, Hall of Fame second baseman widely considered to have been the greatest African-American player of the 19th century.
- May 31 – John Reilly, 78, slugging first baseman for the Cincinnati teams during 10 seasons spanning 1880–1891, who hit for the cycle three times and led the American Association for the most home runs in 1884 and 1888.

=== June ===
- June 9 – Bill Watkins, 79, Canadian manager who guided the Detroit Wolverines to the first professional sports championship for Detroit, Michigan, leading them to the 1887 National League championship en route to defeat the St. Louis Browns in a 15-game World Series.
- June 12 – Jim St. Vrain, 54, pitcher for the Chicago Orphans of the National League in the 1902 season.
- June 14 – Bert Miller, 61, pitcher for the 1897 Louisville Colonels.
- June 15 – Al Krumm, 72, pitcher who played with the Pittsburgh Alleghenys in 1889.
- June 18 – Willie Adams, 46, pitcher who played from 1912 through 1914 with the St. Louis Browns and the Pittsburgh Rebels, and for the Philadelphia Athletics from 1918 to 1919.
- June 28 – Pop Joy, 77, first baseman who played for the Washington Nationals of the Union Association in 1884.
- June 30:
  - Pete O'Brien, 70, second baseman who played for the Washington Nationals in 1887 and the Chicago Colts in 1890.
  - Jerry Upp, 53, pitcher for the 1909 Cleveland Naps.

=== July ===
- July 1 – Russ Hall, 65, shortstop who played for the St. Louis Browns in 1897 and the Cleveland Blues in 1901.
- July 2 – Joe Yeager, 61, pitcher/third baseman who played for the Brooklyn Bridegrooms/Superbas, Detroit Tigers, New York Highlanders and St. Louis Browns in parts of 10 seasons spanning 1898–1908, and a member of the Brooklyn clubs that won the National League pennant in 1899 and 1900.
- July 15 – Tully Sparks, 62, pitcher who played with the Philadelphia Phillies, Pittsburgh Pirates, Milwaukee Brewers, New York Giants and Boston Americans in a span of 11 seasons from 1897 to 1910.
- July 18 – Fred Jacklitsch, 61, catcher who played with five different teams during 13 seasons from 1900 to 1917, seven of them for the Philadelphia Phillies.
- July 22 – Sam Woodruff, 60, third baseman for the Cincinnati Reds in the 1904 and 1910 seasons.
- July 23 – Phil Saylor, 65, relief pitcher for Philadelphia Phillies in the 1891 season.
- July 29 – Pete Fries, 79, pitcher who played from 1883 to 1884 for the Columbus Buckeyes and Indianapolis Hoosiers.

=== August ===
- August 6 – Bruno Block, 52, catcher who played for the Washington Senators, Chicago White Sox and Chicago Chi-Feds in parts of five seasons spanning 1907–1914.
- August 9 – Duff Cooley, 64, outfielder who played for the St. Louis Browns, Philadelphia Phillies, Pittsburgh Pirates, Boston Beaneaters and Detroit Tigers in a span of 13 years from 1893 to 1905.
- August 10 – John Keefe, 70, pitcher who played for the Syracuse Stars of the American Association in 1890.
- August 19 – Bunk Congalton, 62, Canadian-born right fielder for the Chicago Orphans, Cleveland Naps and Boston Americans in four seasons from 1902 to 1907, who finished fourth in the American League batting race with a .320 average in 1906.
- August 21 – George Wright, 90, Hall of Fame pioneer of the sport who starred as a shortstop on the first professional team in 1869, then as captain of the powerhouse Boston teams from 1871 to 1978, and later managed the Providence Grays to the 1879 National League pennant.
- August 22 – John Galligan, 72, outfielder for the 1889 Louisville Colonels.
- August 29 – Stan Rees, 38, pitcher who played with the Washington Senators in the 1918 season.
- August 30 – L. C. Ruch, 75, part-owner of the Philadelphia Phillies from 1913 to 1932 and club president in 1931–1932.
- August 31 – Gene Connell, 31, backup catcher for the 1931 Philadelphia Phillies.

=== September ===
- September 20 – Harry Stovey, 80, outfielder/first baseman and prolific slugger and base-stealer, who became the first player to hit 100 home runs while leading the hitters in homers (five times), hits (4), runs (4), triples (3), total bases (3), slugging (3), stolen bases (2), doubles (1) and RBI (1), in a career that lasted from 1880 to 1893 both in the American Association and the National League.
- September 30 – George Shoch, 78, utility-man who played all-positions except catcher for the Washington Nationals, Milwaukee Brewers, Baltimore Orioles and Brooklyn Grooms/Bridegrooms in 11 seasons spanning 1886–1897, and also a player-manager in 11 Minor League seasons between 1885 and 1905 before retiring at age 46.

=== October ===
- October 1 – Mickey Devine, 45, backup catcher for the Philadelphia Phillies, Boston Red Sox and New York Giants in part of three seasons spanning 1918–1925.
- October 9 – Hank Gastright, 72, pitcher for the Columbus Solons, Washington Senators, Pittsburgh Pirates, Boston Beaneaters, Brooklyn Grooms and Cincinnati Reds from 1889 to 1896. who posted the best winning-percentage of the National League in the 1893 season.
- October 17 – Clyde Hatter, 29, pitcher for the Detroit Tigers in the 1935 and 1937 seasons.
- October 18 – Charlie Starr, 59, second baseman for the St. Louis Browns in 1905 and the Pittsburgh Pirates in 1908, as well as with the Boston Doves and the Philadelphia Phillies during the 1909 season.
- October 23 – John Singleton, 40, pitcher for the 1922 Philadelphia Phillies.
- October 28:
  - Gus Shallix, 79, who pitched from 1884 to 1885 for the Cincinnati Red Stockings.
  - Jesse Whiting, 58, pitcher who played with the Philadelphia Phillies in 1902, and for the Brooklyn Superbas from 1906 to 1907.
- October 31 – Ed Walsh Jr., 32, pitcher and son of Hall of Famer Big Ed Walsh, who played four seasons with the Chicago White Sox before joining the Oakland Oaks of the Pacific Coast League in 1933, when his claim to fame was stopping a young Joe DiMaggio's Minor League record 61-game hitting streak.

=== November ===
- November 1 – Benny Frey, 30, pitcher for the Cincinnati Reds from 1929 to 1936, who committed suicide after being unable to make a comeback following an arm injury.
- November 8 – Henry Mullin, 75, Canadian-born outfielder who played with the Washington Nationals and Boston Reds in the 1884 season.
- November 10 – Fred Andrus, 87, outfielder/pitcher for the Chicago White Stockings in the 1876 and 1884 seasons.
- November 12 – Peek-A-Boo Veach, 75, pitcher and first baseman who played with the Kansas City Cowboys in 1884 and the Louisville Colonels in 1887, and also for the Cleveland Spiders and the Pittsburgh Alleghenys in 1890.
- November 14 – Jack O'Connor, 71, catcher for eight teams in 21 seasons spanning 1887–1910, and just one of 29 ballplayers in Major League Baseball history who have played in four different decades.
- November 16 – Dick Burns, 73, pitcher/outfielder for the Detroit Wolverines, Cincinnati Outlaw Reds and St. Louis Maroons from 1883 through 1885, who hurled a no-hitter against the Kansas City Cowboys in the 1884 season.
- November 17:
  - John Hibbard, 72, pitcher for the 1884 Chicago White Stockings.
  - Bill Merritt, 67, catcher who played from 1891 to 1899 for the Chicago Colts, Louisville Colonels, Boston Beaneaters, Pittsburgh Pirates and Cincinnati Reds.
- November 19 – Cub Stricker, 78, second baseman for seven different teams during an 11-season career spanning 1882–1893, who compiled 1,106 hits and also managed the St. Louis Browns in 1892.
- November 21 – Al Pratt, 90, National Association pitcher/outfielder for the Cleveland Forest Citys from 1889 through 1892, and manager for the Pittsburgh Alleghenys of the American Association in 1882 and 1883.
- November 23 – Welday Walker, 77, utility player for the 1884 Toledo Blue Stockings of the original Northwestern League, who is officially recognized as one of the first African-Americans to play in organized baseball.
- November 25 – Ben Conroy, 66, shortstop who played with the Philadelphia Athletics in 1890.
- November 26 – Andy Bednar, 29, pitcher for the Pittsburgh Pirates in the 1930 and 1931 seasons.

=== December ===
- December 10 – Joe Battin, 84, slick-fielding second baseman who played 10 seasons for seven different clubs, more prominently with the 1875 St. Louis Brown Stockings, where he combined with shortstop/manager Dickey Pearce to become one of the best double play combinations in the early days of baseball, and later managed the Pittsburgh Alleghenys and the Chicago Browns/Pittsburgh Stogies from 1883 to 1884.
- December 12 – Rube Benton, 47, left handed pitcher for the Cincinnati Reds and New York Giants from 1910 through 1925, who led the National League in pitching appearances, starts, batters faced, and hit by pitches in the 1912 season.
- December 16:
  - Frank Boyd, 69, catcher who played briefly for the Cleveland Spiders of the National League in 1893.
  - Charlie Reilly, 70, catcher in parts of eight seasons spanning 1889–1897 for the Columbus Solons, Pittsburgh Pirates, Philadelphia Phillies and Washington Senators, who became the first player to have four hits that included two home runs in his first Major League game, a feat matched by J. P. Arencibia 121 years later.
- December 23 – Walt Preston, 69, outfielder and third baseman who played for the Louisville Colonels of the National League during the 1895 season.
