= List of Los Angeles Dodgers minor league affiliates =

Current Los Angeles Dodgers domestic minor league affiliate locations

The Los Angeles Dodgers farm system consists of seven Minor League Baseball affiliates across the United States and in the Dominican Republic. Four teams are independently owned, while three—the Arizona Complex League Dodgers and two Dominican Summer League Dodgers squads—are owned by the major league club.

The Dodgers have been affiliated with the High-A Great Lakes Loons of the Midwest League since 2007, making it the longest-running active affiliation in the organization among teams not owned by the Dodgers. The longest affiliation in team history was the 38-year relationship with the Albuquerque Dodgers/Dukes from 1963 to 2000. Their newest affiliate is the Ontario Tower Buzzers of the California League, which became the Dodgers' Single-A club in 2026.

Geographically, Los Angeles' closest domestic affiliate is the Ontario Tower Buzzers, which are approximately 37 miles (60 km) away. Los Angeles' furthest domestic affiliate is the Great Lakes Loons some 1,929 miles (3,104 km) away.

== Current affiliates ==
The Los Angeles Dodgers farm system consists of seven minor league affiliates.

| Class | Team | League | Location | Ballpark | Affiliated |
|---|---|---|---|---|---|
| Triple-A | Oklahoma City Comets | Pacific Coast League | Oklahoma City, Oklahoma | Chickasaw Bricktown Ballpark | 2015 |
| Double-A | Tulsa Drillers | Texas League | Tulsa, Oklahoma | Oneok Field | 2015 |
| High-A | Great Lakes Loons | Midwest League | Midland, Michigan | Dow Diamond | 2007 |
| Single-A | Ontario Tower Buzzers | California League | Ontario, California | ONT Field | 2026 |
| Rookie | ACL Dodgers | Arizona Complex League | Phoenix, Arizona | Camelback Ranch | 2021 |
| Rookie | DSL Dodgers Bautista | Dominican Summer League | Santo Domingo, Distrito Nacional | Las Palmas Complex | 2019 |
| Rookie | DSL Dodgers Mega | Dominican Summer League | Santo Domingo, Distrito Nacional | Las Palmas Complex | 2022 |

== Past affiliates ==
=== Key ===
| Season | Each year is linked to an article about that particular Dodgers season. |

=== 1932–1962 ===
Minor League Baseball operated with five classes (Double-A, Class A, Class B, Class C, and Class D) from 1932 to 1935. Class A1, between Double-A and Class A, was added in 1936. The minors continued to operate with these six levels through 1945. Triple-A was established as the highest classification in 1946, and Class A1 became Double-A, with Class A through D remaining. These six levels continued through 1962. The Pacific Coast League (PCL) was reclassified from Triple-A to Open in 1952 due to the possibility of becoming a third major league. This arrangement ended following the 1957 season when the relocation of the National League's Dodgers and Giants to the West Coast ended any chance of the PCL being promoted.

| Season | Triple-A | Double-A | Class A | Class B | Class C | Class D | Ref. |
|---|---|---|---|---|---|---|---|
| 1932 | — | Jersey City Skeeters | Hartford Senators | — | — | — | |
| 1933 | — | — | York White Roses | — | — | — | |
| 1934 | — | — | — | — | Dayton Ducks | — | |
| 1935 | — | Sacramento Senators | Reading Brooks / Allentown Brooks | — | Dayton Ducks | — | |
| 1936 | — | — | Allentown Brooks; Davenport Blue Sox | — | — | Beatrice Blues; Jeanerette Blues; Mayfield Clothiers | |
| 1937 | — | Louisville Colonels | Davenport Blue Sox; Elmira Pioneers; Knoxville Smokies (A1) | Clinton Owls | — | Americus Cardinals; Beatrice Blues; Greensburg Green Sox; Pocomoke City Red Sox | |
| 1938 | — | — | Elmira Pioneers; Nashville Volunteers (A1) | Clinton Owls; Pensacola Pilots; Winston-Salem Twins | Dayton Ducks; Greenwood Dodgers | Beatrice Blues; Cooleemee Weavers; Superior Blues; Tallahassee Capitols | |
| 1939 | — | Montreal Royals | Elmira Pioneers; Nashville Volunteers (A1) | Macon Peaches | Dayton Wings; Gloversville-Johnstown Glovers; Greenville Buckshots | Americus Pioneers; Daytona Beach Islanders; Huntington Boosters; Olean Oilers; Paducah Indians; Reidsville Luckies; Superior Blues | |
| 1940 | — | Montreal Royals | Elmira Pioneers; Nashville Volunteers (A1) | Anniston Rams; Durham Bulls; Macon Peaches | Dayton Wings; Grand Rapids Dodgers | Americus Pioneers; Bassett Furnituremakers; Bowling Green Barons; Fayetteville Angels; Greenville Lions; Johnstown Johnnies; Landis Dodgers; Newport Dodgers; Olean Oilers; Superior Blues | |
| 1941 | — | Montreal Royals | — | Durham Bulls; Reading Brooks | Dayton Ducks; Grand Rapids Colts; Quebec Athletics; Santa Barbara Saints | Big Spring Bombers; Elizabethton Betsy Red Sox; Johnstown Johnnies; Newport Dodgers; Olean Oilers; Troy Dodgers / Tuskegee Airmen; Valdosta Trojans | |
| 1942 | — | Montreal Royals | — | Durham Bulls | Dayton Ducks; Santa Barbara Saints | Johnstown Johnnies; Kingsport Dodgers; Lamesa Dodgers; Olean Oilers; Valdosta Trojans | |
| 1943 | — | Montreal Royals | New Orleans Pelicans (A1) | Durham Bulls | — | Olean Oilers | |
| 1944 | — | Montreal Royals; St. Paul Saints | New Orleans Pelicans (A1) | Newport News Dodgers; Trenton Packers | — | Olean Oilers; Zanesville Dodgers | |
| 1945 | — | Montreal Royals; St. Paul Saints | Mobile Bears (A1) | Newport News Dodgers; Trenton Spartans | — | Olean Oilers; Thomasville Dodgers; Zanesville Dodgers | |
| 1946 | Montreal Royals; St. Paul Saints | Fort Worth Cats; Mobile Bears | — | Asheville Tourists; Danville Dodgers; Meridian Peps; Nashua Dodgers; Newport News Dodgers | Abilene Blue Sox; Grand Forks Chiefs; Johnstown Johnnies; Santa Barbara Dodgers; Trois-Rivières Royals | Cambridge Dodgers; Daytona Beach Islanders; Miami Blues; Olean Oilers; Thomasville Dodgers; Valdosta Dodgers; Zanesville Dodgers | |
| 1947 | Montreal Royals; St. Paul Saints | Fort Worth Cats; Mobile Bears | Greenville Spinners; Pueblo Dodgers | Asheville Tourists; Danville Dodgers; Nashua Dodgers; Newport News Dodgers; Spokane Indians | Abilene Blue Sox; Greenwood Dodgers; Johnstown Johnnies; Santa Barbara Dodgers; Trois-Rivières Royals | Cambridge Dodgers; Kingston Dodgers; Olean Oilers; Ponca City Dodgers; Pulaski Counts; Thomasville Dodgers; Valdosta Dodgers; Zanesville Dodgers | |
| 1948 | Montreal Royals; St. Paul Saints | Fort Worth Cats; Mobile Bears | Greenville Spinners; Pueblo Dodgers | Asheville Tourists; Danville Dodgers; Lancaster Red Roses; Nashua Dodgers; Newport News Dodgers | Abilene Blue Sox; Greenwood Dodgers; Idaho Falls Russets; Johnstown Johnnies; Santa Barbara Dodgers; Trois-Rivières Royals | Cairo Egyptians; Cambridge Dodgers; Medford Nuggets; Olean Oilers; Ponca City Dodgers; Pulaski Counts; Sheboygan Indians; Valdosta Dodgers; Zanesville Dodgers | |
| 1949 | Hollywood Stars; Montreal Royals; St. Paul Saints | Fort Worth Cats; Mobile Bears | Greenville Spinners; Pueblo Dodgers | Asheville Tourists; Danville Dodgers; Lancaster Red Roses; Miami Sun Sox; Nashua Dodgers; Newport News Dodgers | Billings Mustangs; Geneva Robins; Greenwood Dodgers; Johnstown Johnnies; Santa Barbara Dodgers; Trois-Rivières Royals | Cairo Dodgers; Cambridge Dodgers; Ponca City Dodgers; Sheboygan Indians; Valdosta Dodgers | |
| 1950 | Hollywood Stars; Montreal Royals; St. Paul Saints | Fort Worth Cats; Mobile Bears | Elmira Pioneers; Greenville Spinners; Pueblo Dodgers | Asheville Tourists; Danville Dodgers; Lancaster Red Roses; Miami Sun Sox; Newport News Dodgers | Billings Mustangs; Bisbee-Douglas Copper Kings; Greenwood Dodgers; Santa Barbara Dodgers; Trois-Rivières Royals | Hazard Bombers; Hazleton Dodgers; Hornell Dodgers; Ponca City Dodgers; Sheboygan Indians; Valdosta Dodgers | |
| 1951 | Montreal Royals; St. Paul Saints | Fort Worth Cats; Mobile Bears | Elmira Pioneers; Pueblo Dodgers | Asheville Tourists; Lancaster Red Roses; Miami Sun Sox; Newport News Dodgers | Billings Mustangs; Bisbee-Douglas Copper Kings; Greenwood Dodgers; Santa Barbara Dodgers | Hazard Bombers; Hornell Dodgers; Ponca City Dodgers; Sheboygan Indians; Valdosta Dodgers | |
| 1952 | Montreal Royals; St. Paul Saints | Fort Worth Cats; Mobile Bears | Elmira Pioneers; Pueblo Dodgers | Lancaster Red Roses; Miami Sun Sox; Newport News Dodgers | Great Falls Electrics; Greenwood Dodgers; Santa Barbara Dodgers | Hazard Bombers; Hornell Dodgers; Ponca City Dodgers; Sheboygan Indians; Valdosta Dodgers | |
| 1953 | Montreal Royals; St. Paul Saints | Fort Worth Cats; Mobile Bears | Elmira Pioneers; Pueblo Dodgers | Asheville Tourists; Miami Sun Sox; Newport News Dodgers | Great Falls Electrics; Santa Barbara Dodgers | Hornell Dodgers; Shawnee Hawks; Sheboygan Indians; Thomasville Dodgers; Union City Dodgers | |
| 1954 | Montreal Royals; St. Paul Saints | Fort Worth Cats; Mobile Bears | Elmira Pioneers; Pueblo Dodgers | Asheville Tourists; Miami Sun Sox; Newport News Dodgers | Bakersfield Indians; Great Falls Electrics | Hornell Dodgers; Shawnee Hawks; Thomasville Dodgers; Union City Dodgers | |
| 1955 | Montreal Royals; St. Paul Saints | Fort Worth Cats; Mobile Bears | Elmira Pioneers; Pueblo Dodgers | Asheville Tourists; Cedar Rapids Raiders; Newport News Dodgers | Bakersfield Indians; Great Falls Electrics | Hornell Dodgers; Shawnee Hawks; Thomasville Dodgers; Union City Dodgers | |
| 1956 | Montreal Royals; Portland Beavers (Open); St. Paul Saints | Fort Worth Cats | Macon Dodgers; Pueblo Dodgers | Cedar Rapids Raiders; Wichita Falls Spudders | Great Falls Electrics; Reno Silver Sox | Hornell Dodgers; Kokomo Dodgers; Shawnee Hawks; Thomasville Dodgers | |
| 1957 | Los Angeles Angels (Open); Montreal Royals; St. Paul Saints | — | Macon Dodgers; Pueblo Dodgers | Cedar Rapids Raiders; Victoria Rosebuds | Great Falls Electrics; Reno Silver Sox | Bluefield Dodgers; Kokomo Dodgers; Shawnee Hawks; Thomasville Dodgers | |
| 1958 | Montreal Royals; Spokane Indians; St. Paul Saints | Victoria Rosebuds | Des Moines Bruins; Macon Dodgers | Green Bay Bluejays | Great Falls Electrics; Reno Silver Sox | Columbus Foxes; Kokomo Dodgers; Thomasville Dodgers | |
| 1959 | Montreal Royals; Spokane Indians; St. Paul Saints | Victoria Rosebuds | Macon Dodgers | Green Bay Bluejays | Great Falls Electrics; Reno Silver Sox | Kokomo Dodgers; Odessa Dodgers; Orlando Dodgers; Panama City Fliers | |
| 1960 | Montreal Royals; Spokane Indians; St. Paul Saints | Atlanta Crackers | Macon Dodgers | Green Bay Dodgers | Great Falls Electrics; Reno Silver Sox | Kokomo Dodgers; Odessa Dodgers; Orlando Dodgers; Panama City Fliers | |
| 1961 | Omaha Dodgers; Spokane Indians | Atlanta Crackers | Greenville Spinners | Salem Dodgers | Great Falls Electrics; Reno Silver Sox | Artesia Dodgers; Kokomo Dodgers; Orlando Dodgers; Panama City Fliers | |
| 1962 | Omaha Dodgers; Spokane Indians | — | Greenville Spinners | Salem Dodgers | Great Falls Electrics; Reno Silver Sox | Keokuk Dodgers / Midwest Dodgers; Ozark Dodgers / Andalusia Dodgers; St. Petersburg Saints | |

=== 1963–1989 ===
Prior to the 1963 season, Major League Baseball (MLB) initiated a reorganization of Minor League Baseball that resulted in a reduction from six classes to four (Triple-A, Double-A, Class A, and Rookie) in response to the general decline of the minors throughout the 1950s and early-1960s when leagues and teams folded due to shrinking attendance caused by baseball fans' preference for staying at home to watch MLB games on television. The only change made within the next 27 years was Class A being subdivided for the first time to form Class A Short Season in 1966.

| Season | Triple-A | Double-A | Class A | Class A Short Season | Rookie | Ref(s). |
|---|---|---|---|---|---|---|
| 1963 | Spokane Indians | Albuquerque Dodgers | Great Falls Electrics; Salem Dodgers; Salisbury Dodgers; Santa Barbara Dodgers; St. Petersburg Saints | — | — | |
| 1964 | Spokane Indians | Albuquerque Dodgers | Grand Forks Chiefs; Salem Dodgers; Salisbury Dodgers; Santa Barbara Dodgers; St. Petersburg Saints | — | Pocatello Chiefs | |
| 1965 | Spokane Indians | Albuquerque Dodgers | Salem Dodgers; Santa Barbara Dodgers; St. Petersburg Saints | — | Pocatello Chiefs | |
| 1966 | Spokane Indians | Albuquerque Dodgers | Jamestown Dodgers; Santa Barbara Dodgers | Tri-City Atoms | Ogden Dodgers | |
| 1967 | Spokane Indians | Albuquerque Dodgers | Dubuque Packers; Santa Barbara Dodgers | Tri-City Atoms | Ogden Dodgers | |
| 1968 | Spokane Indians | Albuquerque Dodgers | Bakersfield Dodgers; Daytona Beach Dodgers | Tri-City Atoms | Ogden Dodgers | |
| 1969 | Spokane Indians | Albuquerque Dodgers | Bakersfield Dodgers; Daytona Beach Dodgers | Rogue Valley Dodgers | Ogden Dodgers | |
| 1970 | Spokane Indians | Albuquerque Dodgers | Bakersfield Dodgers; Daytona Beach Dodgers | Medford Dodgers | Ogden Dodgers | |
| 1971 | Spokane Indians | Albuquerque Dodgers | Bakersfield Dodgers; Daytona Beach Dodgers | Medford Dodgers | Ogden Dodgers | |
| 1972 | Albuquerque Dukes | El Paso Dodgers | Bakersfield Dodgers; Daytona Beach Dodgers | Spokane Indians | Ogden Dodgers | |
| 1973 | Albuquerque Dukes | Waterbury Dodgers | Bakersfield Dodgers; Daytona Beach Dodgers | Bellingham Dodgers | Ogden Dodgers | |
| 1974 | Albuquerque Dukes | Waterbury Dodgers | Bakersfield Dodgers; Orangeburg Dodgers | Bellingham Dodgers | — | |
| 1975 | Albuquerque Dukes | Waterbury Dodgers | Bakersfield Dodgers; Danville Dodgers | Bellingham Dodgers | — | |
| 1976 | Albuquerque Dukes | Waterbury Dodgers | Danville Dodgers; Lodi Dodgers | Bellingham Dodgers | — | |
| 1977 | Albuquerque Dukes | San Antonio Dodgers | Clinton Dodgers; Lodi Dodgers | — | Lethbridge Dodgers | |
| 1978 | Albuquerque Dukes | San Antonio Dodgers | Clinton Dodgers; Lodi Dodgers | — | Lethbridge Dodgers | |
| 1979 | Albuquerque Dukes | San Antonio Dodgers | Clinton Dodgers; Lodi Dodgers | — | Lethbridge Dodgers | |
| 1980 | Albuquerque Dukes | San Antonio Dodgers | Lodi Dodgers; Vero Beach Dodgers | — | Lethbridge Dodgers | |
| 1981 | Albuquerque Dukes | San Antonio Dodgers | Lodi Dodgers; Vero Beach Dodgers | — | Lethbridge Dodgers | |
| 1982 | Albuquerque Dukes | San Antonio Dodgers | Lodi Dodgers; Vero Beach Dodgers | — | Lethbridge Dodgers | |
| 1983 | Albuquerque Dukes | San Antonio Dodgers | Lodi Dodgers; Vero Beach Dodgers | — | Lethbridge Dodgers; GCL Dodgers | |
| 1984 | Albuquerque Dukes | San Antonio Dodgers | Bakersfield Dodgers; Vero Beach Dodgers | — | Great Falls Dodgers; GCL Dodgers | |
| 1985 | Albuquerque Dukes | San Antonio Dodgers | Bakersfield Dodgers; Vero Beach Dodgers | — | Great Falls Dodgers; GCL Dodgers | |
| 1986 | Albuquerque Dukes | San Antonio Dodgers | Bakersfield Dodgers; Vero Beach Dodgers | — | Great Falls Dodgers; GCL Dodgers | |
| 1987 | Albuquerque Dukes | San Antonio Dodgers | Bakersfield Dodgers; Vero Beach Dodgers | — | Great Falls Dodgers; GCL Dodgers | |
| 1988 | Albuquerque Dukes | San Antonio Missions | Bakersfield Dodgers; Vero Beach Dodgers | Salem Dodgers | Great Falls Dodgers; GCL Dodgers | |
| 1989 | Albuquerque Dukes | San Antonio Missions | Bakersfield Dodgers; Vero Beach Dodgers | Salem Dodgers | Great Falls Dodgers; GCL Dodgers; DSL Dodgers | |

=== 1990–2020 ===
Minor League Baseball operated with six classes from 1990 to 2020. In 1990, the Class A level was subdivided for a second time with the creation of Class A-Advanced. The Rookie level consisted of domestic and foreign circuits.

| Season | Triple-A | Double-A | Class A-Advanced | Class A | Class A Short Season | Rookie | Foreign Rookie | Ref(s). |
|---|---|---|---|---|---|---|---|---|
| 1990 | Albuquerque Dukes | San Antonio Missions | Bakersfield Dodgers; Vero Beach Dodgers | — | Yakima Bears | Great Falls Dodgers; GCL Dodgers | DSL Cibao Dodgers; DSL San Pedro de Macoris Dodgers | |
| 1991 | Albuquerque Dukes | San Antonio Missions | Bakersfield Dodgers; Vero Beach Dodgers | — | Yakima Bears | Great Falls Dodgers; GCL Dodgers | DSL Dodgers; DSL Dodgers/Angels/Padres | |
| 1992 | Albuquerque Dukes | San Antonio Missions | Bakersfield Dodgers; Vero Beach Dodgers | — | Yakima Bears | Great Falls Dodgers; GCL Dodgers | DSL Dodgers 1 DSL Dodgers 2 | |
| 1993 | Albuquerque Dukes | San Antonio Missions | Bakersfield Dodgers; Vero Beach Dodgers | — | Yakima Bears | Great Falls Dodgers | DSL Dodgers 1 DSL Dodgers/Angels | |
| 1994 | Albuquerque Dukes | San Antonio Missions | Bakersfield Dodgers; Vero Beach Dodgers | — | Yakima Bears | Great Falls Dodgers | DSL Dodgers 1 DSL Dodgers 2 | |
| 1995 | Albuquerque Dukes | San Antonio Missions | San Bernardino Spirit; Vero Beach Dodgers | — | Yakima Bears | Great Falls Dodgers | DSL Dodgers 1 DSL Dodgers 2 | |
| 1996 | Albuquerque Dukes | San Antonio Missions | San Bernardino Stampede; Vero Beach Dodgers | Savannah Sand Gnats | Yakima Bears | Great Falls Dodgers | DSL Dodgers 1 DSL Dodgers 2 | |
| 1997 | Albuquerque Dukes | San Antonio Missions | San Bernardino Stampede; Vero Beach Dodgers | Savannah Sand Gnats | Yakima Bears | Great Falls Dodgers | DSL Dodgers 1 DSL Dodgers 2 | |
| 1998 | Albuquerque Dukes | San Antonio Missions | San Bernardino Stampede; Vero Beach Dodgers | — | Yakima Bears | Great Falls Dodgers | DSL Dodgers 1 DSL Dodgers 2 | |
| 1999 | Albuquerque Dukes | San Antonio Missions | San Bernardino Stampede; Vero Beach Dodgers | — | Yakima Bears | Great Falls Dodgers | DSL Dodgers 1 DSL Dodgers 2 | |
| 2000 | Albuquerque Dukes | San Antonio Missions | San Bernardino Stampede; Vero Beach Dodgers | — | Yakima Bears | Great Falls Dodgers | DSL Dodgers | |
| 2001 | Las Vegas 51s | Jacksonville Suns | Vero Beach Dodgers | Wilmington Waves | — | Great Falls Dodgers; GCL Dodgers | DSL Dodgers | |
| 2002 | Las Vegas 51s | Jacksonville Suns | Vero Beach Dodgers | South Georgia Waves | — | Great Falls Dodgers; GCL Dodgers | DSL Dodgers 1 DSL Dodgers 2 VSL San Joaquin (Note: In 2002, the Dodgres operated a Venezuelan Summer League team as a co-op with the Florida Marlins.) | |
| 2003 | Las Vegas 51s | Jacksonville Suns | Vero Beach Dodgers | South Georgia Waves | — | Ogden Raptors; GCL Dodgers | DSL Dodgers 1 DSL Dodgers 2 | |
| 2004 | Las Vegas 51s | Jacksonville Suns | Vero Beach Dodgers | Columbus Catfish | — | Ogden Raptors; GCL Dodgers | DSL Dodgers 1 DSL Dodgers 2 | |
| 2005 | Las Vegas 51s | Jacksonville Suns | Vero Beach Dodgers | Columbus Catfish | — | Ogden Raptors; GCL Dodgers | DSL Dodgers | |
| 2006 | Las Vegas 51s | Jacksonville Suns | Vero Beach Dodgers | Columbus Catfish | — | Ogden Raptors; GCL Dodgers | DSL Dodgers | |
| 2007 | Las Vegas 51s | Jacksonville Suns | Inland Empire 66ers | Great Lakes Loons | — | Ogden Raptors; GCL Dodgers | DSL Dodgers | |
| 2008 | Las Vegas 51s | Jacksonville Suns | Inland Empire 66ers | Great Lakes Loons | — | Ogden Raptors; GCL Dodgers | DSL Dodgers | |
| 2009 | Albuquerque Isotopes | Chattanooga Lookouts | Inland Empire 66ers | Great Lakes Loons | — | Ogden Raptors; AZL Dodgers | DSL Dodgers | |
| 2010 | Albuquerque Isotopes | Chattanooga Lookouts | Inland Empire 66ers | Great Lakes Loons | — | Ogden Raptors; AZL Dodgers | DSL Dodgers | |
| 2011 | Albuquerque Isotopes | Chattanooga Lookouts | Rancho Cucamonga Quakes | Great Lakes Loons | — | Ogden Raptors; AZL Dodgers | DSL Dodgers | |
| 2012 | Albuquerque Isotopes | Chattanooga Lookouts | Rancho Cucamonga Quakes | Great Lakes Loons | — | Ogden Raptors; AZL Dodgers | DSL Dodgers | |
| 2013 | Albuquerque Isotopes | Chattanooga Lookouts | Rancho Cucamonga Quakes | Great Lakes Loons | — | Ogden Raptors; AZL Dodgers | DSL Dodgers | |
| 2014 | Albuquerque Isotopes | Chattanooga Lookouts | Rancho Cucamonga Quakes | Great Lakes Loons | — | Ogden Raptors; AZL Dodgers | DSL Dodgers | |
| 2015 | Oklahoma City Dodgers | Tulsa Drillers | Rancho Cucamonga Quakes | Great Lakes Loons | — | Ogden Raptors; AZL Dodgers | DSL Dodgers | |
| 2016 | Oklahoma City Dodgers | Tulsa Drillers | Rancho Cucamonga Quakes | Great Lakes Loons | — | Ogden Raptors; AZL Dodgers | DSL Dodgers 1 DSL Dodgers 2 | |
| 2017 | Oklahoma City Dodgers | Tulsa Drillers | Rancho Cucamonga Quakes | Great Lakes Loons | — | Ogden Raptors; AZL Dodgers | DSL Dodgers 1 DSL Dodgers 2 | |
| 2018 | Oklahoma City Dodgers | Tulsa Drillers | Rancho Cucamonga Quakes | Great Lakes Loons | — | Ogden Raptors; AZL Dodgers | DSL Dodgers Guerrero; DSL Dodgers Robinson | |
| 2019 | Oklahoma City Dodgers | Tulsa Drillers | Rancho Cucamonga Quakes | Great Lakes Loons | — | Ogden Raptors; AZL Dodgers Lasorda; AZL Dodgers Mota | DSL Dodgers Bautista; DSL Dodgers Shoemaker | |
| 2020 (Note: The 2020 Minor League Baseball season was cancelled due to the COVID-19 pandemic.) | Oklahoma City Dodgers | Tulsa Drillers | Rancho Cucamonga Quakes | Great Lakes Loons | — | Ogden Raptors; AZL Dodgers Lasorda; AZL Dodgers Mota | DSL Dodgers Bautista; DSL Dodgers Shoemaker | |

=== 2021–present ===
The current structure of Minor League Baseball is the result of an overall contraction of the system beginning with the 2021 season. Class A was reduced to two levels: High-A and Low-A. Low-A was reclassified as Single-A in 2022.

| Season | Triple-A | Double-A | High-A | Single-A | Rookie | Foreign Rookie | Ref. |
|---|---|---|---|---|---|---|---|
| 2021 | Oklahoma City Dodgers | Tulsa Drillers | Great Lakes Loons | Rancho Cucamonga Quakes | ACL Dodgers | DSL Dodgers Bautista; DSL Dodgers Shoemaker | |
| 2022 | Oklahoma City Dodgers | Tulsa Drillers | Great Lakes Loons | Rancho Cucamonga Quakes | ACL Dodgers | DSL Dodgers Bautista; DSL Dodgers Mega | |
| 2023 | Oklahoma City Dodgers | Tulsa Drillers | Great Lakes Loons | Rancho Cucamonga Quakes | ACL Dodgers | DSL Dodgers Bautista; DSL Dodgers Mega | |
| 2024 | Oklahoma City Baseball Club | Tulsa Drillers | Great Lakes Loons | Rancho Cucamonga Quakes | ACL Dodgers | DSL Dodgers Bautista; DSL Dodgers Mega | |
| 2025 | Oklahoma City Comets | Tulsa Drillers | Great Lakes Loons | Rancho Cucamonga Quakes | ACL Dodgers | DSL Dodgers Bautista; DSL Dodgers Mega | |
| 2026 | Oklahoma City Comets | Tulsa Drillers | Great Lakes Loons | Ontario Tower Buzzers | ACL Dodgers | DSL Dodgers Bautista; DSL Dodgers Mega | |
