= Freddie Fitzsimmons =

American baseball player and manager (1901–1979)

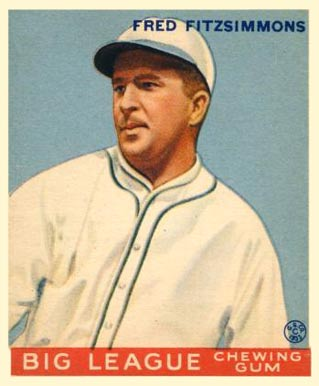
- Fitzsimmons on a 1933 Goudey baseball card
- Pitcher / Manager
- Born: July 28, 1901; Mishawaka, Indiana, U.S.
- Died: November 18, 1979 (aged 78); Yucca Valley, California, U.S.
- Batted: Right Threw: Right

MLB debut
- August 12, 1925, for the New York Giants

Last MLB appearance
- July 16, 1943, for the Brooklyn Dodgers

MLB statistics
- Win–loss record: 217–146
- Earned run average: 3.51
- Strikeouts: 870
- Stats at Baseball Reference
- Managerial record at Baseball Reference

Teams
- As player: New York Giants (1925–1937); Brooklyn Dodgers (1937–1943); As manager: Philadelphia Phillies (1943–1945); As coach: Brooklyn Dodgers (1940); Boston Braves (1948); New York Giants (1949–1955); Chicago Cubs (1957–1959); Kansas City Athletics (1960); Chicago Cubs (1966)

Career highlights and awards
- 2× World Series champion (1933, 1954)

Frederick Landis Fitzsimmons (July 28, 1901 – November 18, 1979) was an American professional baseball right-handed pitcher, manager, and coach, who played in Major League Baseball (MLB) from 1925 to 1943 with the New York Giants and Brooklyn Dodgers. Nicknamed Fat Freddie (he carried as much as 205 pounds (93 kg) on his 5 feet 11 inches (1.80 m) frame), and known for his mastery of the knuckle curve, Fitzsimmons' 217 wins were the third most by a National League (NL) right-hander in the period from 1920 to 1955, trailing only Burleigh Grimes and Paul Derringer. In 1940 he set an NL record, which stood until 1959, with a single-season winning percentage of .889 (16–2). He was an agile fielder in spite of his heavy build, holding the major league record for career double plays (79) from 1938 to 1964, and tying another record by leading the league in putouts four times; he ranked eighth in NL history in putouts (237) and ninth in fielding percentage (.977) when his career ended.

== Playing career ==
Born in Mishawaka, Indiana, Fitzsimmons broke in with the Giants in August 1925, posting a 6–3 record over the rest of the year. After seasons of 14 and 17 wins, he earned a career-high 20 victories in 1928, a year which saw the arrival of teammate Carl Hubbell; until Fitzsimmons' departure in 1937, the two formed a formidable left-right combination at the heart of the Giants' staff. In 1930 he led the NL in winning percentage for the first time with a 19–7 record (.731), and an 18–11 season followed in 1931. In 1933, the first full season after Bill Terry took over from John McGraw as manager, he won 16 games with a 2.90 earned run average as the Giants won the NL pennant; in the 1933 World Series against the Washington Senators, he suffered a 4–0 defeat in Game 3, though it was New York's only loss as they captured their first title since 1922.

Fitzsimmons had another 18-win season in 1934, and led the NL in putouts for the fourth time, tying Grover Cleveland Alexander's major league mark. However, his career then began to plateau. He had years of 4–8 and 10–7 in 1935 and 1936, with the Giants winning the NL pennant again the latter year; he led the NL in shutouts in 1935, blanking opponents in all 4 of his victories. His troubles returned in the 1936 World Series against the New York Yankees; he lost Game 3 by a 2–1 score, and was bombarded in the final Game 6 loss, leaving in the fourth inning while trailing 5–2. After a 6–10 start in 1937, he was traded to the Dodgers in June for reliever Tom Baker, who made only 15 appearances for the Giants. Brooklyn shortstop Leo Durocher praised his new teammate's competitiveness, saying, "I wish we had nine guys like Fitz. We'd never lose." Though his record in 1938–1939 totaled only 17–18, in 1938 he tied Grimes' mark of 74 career double plays, passing him the following year; Warren Spahn broke his record in 1964. He came back in 1940 with a 16–2 campaign, finishing fifth in the MVP voting. His .889 winning percentage broke the NL record of .842 (16–3) shared by Tom L. Hughes (1916 Boston Braves) and Emil Yde (1924 Pittsburgh Pirates), and stood until Roy Face posted an 18–1 mark (.947) with the 1959 Pirates.

Fitzsimmons made only 12 starts in 1941, going 6–1 as the Dodgers won their first pennant since 1920. He almost earned his long-elusive World Series victory against the Yankees, holding them to four hits through seven innings in Game 3. But he was forced to leave with a 0–0 score after being struck in the kneecap by a line drive hit by Marius Russo, which caromed into Pee Wee Reese's glove to end the inning. His replacement surrendered two runs in the eighth, and New York triumphed 2–1.

Fitzsimmons compiled a 217–146 (.598) record with an ERA of 3.51 and 870 strikeouts in 513 games and 3,2232/3 innings pitched. According to Durocher, Fitzsimmons would tell hitters in advance that he was going to throw a brushback pitch. Offensively, he was a better than average hitting pitcher in his career. He compiled a .200 average (231–1155) with 112 runs, 103 RBI and 14 home runs. In 1930, 1931, and 1932 as a member of the New York Giants, he drove in 13, 18, and 10 runs respectively. In four World Series appearances, he batted .375 (3–8).

== Manager and coach ==
Following his knee injury, Fitzsimmons made only one start in 1942 and served as a coach on player-manager Durocher's staff. He then returned to the active list and made nine appearances for the 1943 Dodgers before Brooklyn released him July 27. The following day, the tail-ending Philadelphia Phillies tabbed him as their manager, replacing Bucky Harris and ending Fitzsimmons' playing career.

He managed the Phillies through the middle of the 1945 season, compiling only 105 wins against 181 losses (.367). In 1943 and 1944, he also served as general manager of the Brooklyn Dodgers in the All-America Football Conference. After World War II, Fitzsimmons became a coach with the Boston Braves (1948), Giants (1949–1955), Chicago Cubs (1957–1959; 1966), and Kansas City Athletics (1960). He also managed in minor league baseball. On Durocher's Giants staff, Fitzsimmons finally earned a championship as a coach for the 1954 World Series team.

Bob Lemon broke the major league mark shared by Fitzsimmons by leading the American League in putouts five times between 1948 and 1954; Greg Maddux eventually broke the NL record.

Fitzsimmons died of a heart attack at age 78 in Yucca Valley, California. He was buried at Montecito Memorial Park, in Colton, California.

== See also ==
- List of Major League Baseball career wins leaders
