= George Fallon =

George Fallon may refer to:

- George Hyde Fallon (1902–1980), U.S. Congressman from Maryland
- George Fallon (baseball) (1914–1994), American baseball infielder
