= Tony Malinosky =

American baseball player

- Third baseman / Shortstop
- Born: October 7, 1909; Collinsville, Illinois, U.S.
- Died: February 8, 2011 (aged 101); Oxnard, California, U.S.
- Batted: Right Threw: Right

MLB debut
- April 26, 1937, for the Brooklyn Dodgers

Last MLB appearance
- July 16, 1937, for the Brooklyn Dodgers

MLB statistics
- Batting average: .228
- Home runs: 0
- Runs batted in: 3
- Stats at Baseball Reference

Teams
- Brooklyn Dodgers (1937)

Anthony Francis Malinosky (October 7, 1909 – February 8, 2011) was an American professional baseball player. He played third base and shortstop in Major League baseball in 35 games for the Brooklyn Dodgers in the 1937 season. Listed at 5' 10", Weight: 165 lb., he batted and threw right-handed.

== Biography ==
Born to Lithuanian immigrants in Collinsville, Illinois, Malinosky idolized Babe Ruth. He was 5 years old when he decided to become a baseball player. He was the captain of the baseball team of El Monte High School and attended Whittier College, where he played baseball and was a classmate of future US President Richard Nixon.

The Pittsburgh Pirates signed Malinosky to his first professional contract, and then sold his rights to the Dodgers in 1936.

During World War II, Malinosky was drafted by the United States Army, with which he saw combat in the Battle of the Bulge.

The Los Angeles Dodgers honored Malinosky at Dodger Stadium in 2009, on the occasion of his 100th birthday. In a statement released after his death, the Dodgers said "Tony lived an incredibly full life, both on and off the field, He remained a Dodger fan his whole life and his visit to Dodger Stadium in 2009 gave the organization a great opportunity to celebrate not only his 100th birthday, but the Dodger chapter of his life that meant so much to him. He will be most certainly missed by all who knew him."

Malinosky was a longtime resident of Oxnard, California since moving to the area in 1976. He was married to his high school sweetheart Viola for 64 years until she died in 1999. He died on February 8, 2011, at age of 101. At the time of his death, he was the oldest living Major League Baseball player.

== See also ==
- List of centenarians (Major League Baseball players)
- List of centenarians (sportspeople)

== Sources ==
Records
Preceded by Billy Werber	Oldest recognized verified living baseball player January 22, 2009 – February 8, 2011	Succeeded by Connie Marrero
