= Bob Barr (1930s pitcher) =

American baseball player (1908–2002)

- Pitcher
- Born: March 12, 1908; Newton, Massachusetts, U.S.
- Died: July 25, 2002 (aged 94); Dover, New Hampshire, U.S.
- Batted: Right Threw: Right

MLB debut
- September 11, 1935, for the Brooklyn Dodgers

Last MLB appearance
- September 14, 1935, for the Brooklyn Dodgers

MLB statistics
- Win–loss record: 0–0
- Earned run average: 3.86
- Strikeouts: 0
- Stats at Baseball Reference

Teams
- Brooklyn Dodgers (1935)

Robert Alexander Barr (March 12, 1908 – July 25, 2002) was an American pitcher in Major League Baseball. He pitched in two games for the 1935 Brooklyn Dodgers, working 2 1/3 innings and allowing five hits and three runs.
