= George Cisar (baseball) =

American baseball player (1910-2010)

- Left fielder
- Born: August 25, 1910; Chicago, Illinois, U.S.
- Died: February 19, 2010 (aged 99); Elmhurst, Illinois, U.S.
- Batted: Right Threw: Right

MLB debut
- September 9, 1937, for the Brooklyn Dodgers

Last MLB appearance
- October 3, 1937, for the Brooklyn Dodgers

MLB statistics
- Batting average: .207
- Home runs: 0
- Runs batted in: 4
- Stats at Baseball Reference

Teams
- Brooklyn Dodgers (1937)

George Cisar (August 25, 1910 – February 19, 2010) was an American left fielder in Major League Baseball who played briefly for the Brooklyn Dodgers during the 1937 season. He batted and threw right-handed.

== Early life and education ==
Born in Chicago and raised on the city's Southwest Side, Cisar attended Harrison Technical High School in Chicago.

== Baseball career ==
Cisar began playing baseball in Chicago and eventually started going to tryouts around the country. In 1935, he was signed by the Brooklyn Dodgers' Leaksville-Draper-Spray Triplets minor-league team. After spending all of 1936 and most of 1937 in the minors, Cisar was elevated to the Dodgers in September 1937.

In a 20–game career, Cisar posted a .207 batting average (6–for–29) with eight runs, four runs batted in, and three stolen bases without a home run.

== After baseball ==
After several more years in the minors, Cisar quit baseball for good after the 1940 season and eventually served in World War II. After the war, he settled in Cicero, Illinois, and worked as a machinist in Chicago.

At the time of his death, Cisar was the second oldest living MLB player. He is not to be confused with the American character actor of the same name who died in 1979.

== Death ==
Cisar died on February 19, 2010, in Elmhurst, Illinois.

== Personal ==
Cisar lived for many years in Cicero, Illinois. He moved to North Riverside, Illinois, around 2001.

When he was breaking into baseball, Cisar lied about his birth date in order to make himself appear younger than he really was. As a result, many baseball references give him a 1912 birth date, even though he really was born in 1910, his daughter has said.
