= Lindsay Brown (baseball) =

American baseball player (1911–1967)

- Shortstop
- Born: July 22, 1911; Mason, Texas, U.S.
- Died: January 1, 1967 (aged 55); San Antonio, Texas, U.S.
- Batted: Right Threw: Right

MLB debut
- July 13, 1937, for the Brooklyn Dodgers

Last MLB appearance
- October 3, 1937, for the Brooklyn Dodgers

MLB statistics
- Batting average: .270
- Home runs: 0
- Runs batted in: 6
- Stats at Baseball Reference

Teams
- Brooklyn Dodgers (1937)

John Lindsay Brown (July 22, 1911 – January 1, 1967) was an American professional baseball player who played shortstop in the major leagues for the 1937 Brooklyn Dodgers.
