= Fred Frankhouse =

American baseball player (1904–1989)

- Pitcher
- Born: April 9, 1904; Port Royal, Pennsylvania, U.S.
- Died: August 17, 1989 (aged 85); Mifflintown, Pennsylvania, U.S.
- Batted: Right Threw: Right

MLB debut
- September 7, 1927, for the St. Louis Cardinals

Last MLB appearance
- September 25, 1939, for the Boston Bees

MLB statistics
- Win–loss record: 106–97
- Earned run average: 3.92
- Strikeouts: 622
- Stats at Baseball Reference

Teams
- St. Louis Cardinals (1927–1930); Boston Braves (1930–1935); Brooklyn Dodgers (1936–1938); Boston Bees (1939)

Career highlights and awards
- All-Star (1934)

Frederick Meloy Frankhouse (April 9, 1904 – August 17, 1989) was an American professional baseball pitcher who played 13 seasons in Major League Baseball from 1927 to 1939. His specialty pitch was "the old roundhouse curve", and he was often referred to as a "spitballer" during his career as a pitcher. Frankhouse played in the National League for the St. Louis Cardinals (1927–1930), the Boston Braves (1930–1935), the Brooklyn Dodgers (1936–1938), and the Boston Bees (1939) In 1928, Frankhouse went to the World Series with the Cardinals but never got a chance to pitch. He did, however, receive a World Series ring with the rest of his team. In 1934, Frankhouse was a member of the All-Star roster. He made his major league debut on September 11, 1927 for the St. Louis Cardinals, and played his last game September 25, 1939 vs. New York Giants as a pitcher for the Boston Bees.

== Early life and education ==
Frankhouse was born on April 9, 1904, to Charles David "CD" and Jennie (Meloy) Frankhouse in Port Royal, Juniata County, Pennsylvania. He had two sisters, Margaret and Martha, and two brothers, Melvin and Joseph. Frankhouse attended Port Royal Elementary school and Port Royal High School and graduated from Lewistown High School. Frankhouse married St. Louis native, Mabel Skiles, on January 1, 1929. Frankhouse did not attend college, rather he began his professional baseball upon graduating high school.

== Professional career ==
=== Career before Major League Baseball ===
Frankhouse began his baseball career in his teens by playing with local teams in Perry and Dauphin counties, and, from 1917 to 1923, he pitched for the minor league Harrisburg Senators. He was only 19 when a scout brought him from the lots of his home town of Port Royal, Pennsylvania. He signed his first professional contract with St. Louis in 1922 and was farmed out to the Ottawa Senators (1922–1923), the Syracuse Stars (1923–1926), and the Houston Buffaloes (1927).

"My curve ball is fashioned by the snap of my wrist and the position of my fingers on the ball. My middle fingers are bent under, pressing the cover." - Fred Frankhouse in Baseball Magazine (March 1932)

=== St. Louis Cardinals ===
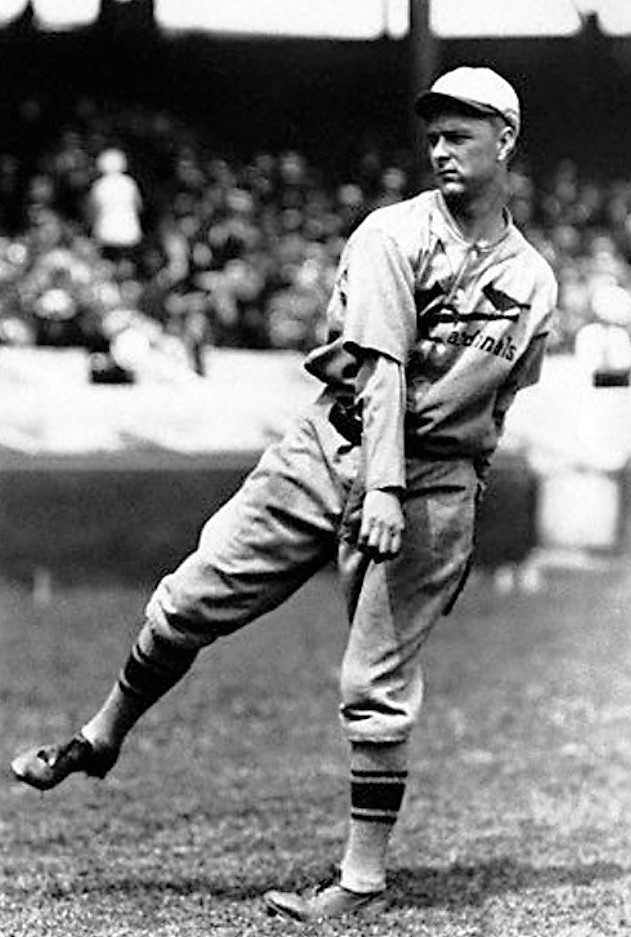
Frankhouse pitching in his first game as a St. Louis Cardinal

In 1927, Frankhouse was recalled by St. Louis, and played in his MLB debut on September 7, 1927. While with the Cardinals, Frankhouse knew such greats as Dizzy Dean and Pepper Martin. Also on the Cardinals with Frankhouse were Hall-of-Famers Frankie "The Fordham Flash" Frisch and Walter "Rabbit" Maranville, both of whom Frankhouse later joined on the Braves. In 1928, Frankhouse went to the World Series with the Cardinals but never got a chance to pitch as his Cardinals were beaten in four games straight by the Yankees. He did, however, receive a World Series ring with the rest of his team. He remained with St. Louis until 1930 when he was traded to the Boston Braves.

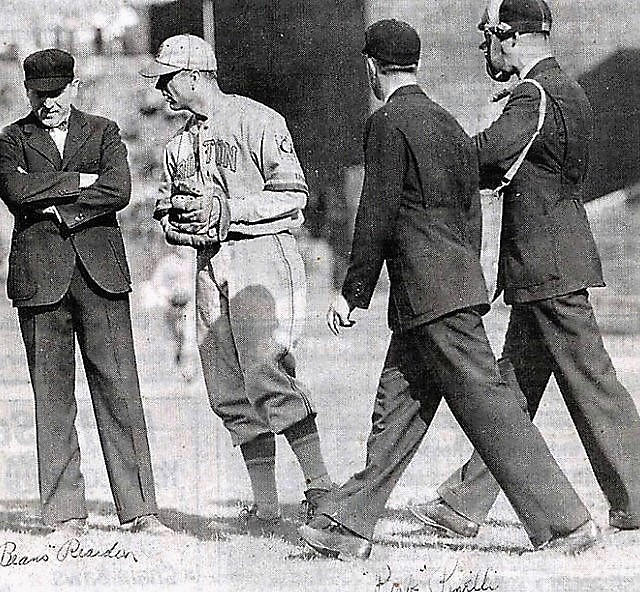
Frankhouse and Umpires reacting to an alleged spitball pitch

=== Boston Braves ===
On June 16, 1930, Frankhouse, along with Bill Sherdel, was traded by the Boston Braves for Burleigh Grimes. In 1934, Frankhouse had his best year pitching, and was chosen for the All Star Team, the second All Star Game ever held. 1934 was Frankhouse's best year with a 17–9 record despite missing a month of the season due to injury. In 1935, while with the Braves, Frankhouse pitched in Babe Ruth's final game. On February 6, 1936, Frankhouse was traded by the Boston Braves to the Brooklyn Dodgers for Johnny Babich and Gene Moore. On May 17, 1939, during a game against the Cincinnati Reds, Ernie Lombardi complained that Frankhouse, struck him out using the illegal spitball. Frankhouse promptly hit the next batter, Harry Craft, in the head, knocking him unconscious. Frankhouse then bowed to the booing fans at the end of the inning. Even though players did not wear helmets in those days, Craft was soon back in action.

=== Brooklyn Dodgers ===
Frankhouse played for the Brooklyn Dodgers beginning in 1936 after being traded from the Boston Braves. He was reunited with Casey Stengel who he from his days with the Braves. One notable moment from Frankhouse's career occurred when he pitched a no-hitter against the Cincinnati Reds at Ebbets Field. Frankhouse pitched a no-hit ballgame for Brooklyn against Cincinnati for 7 2/3 innings August 27, 1937 when rain halted the game permanently. After Frankhouse had retired two in the eighth, a heavy downpour ended the contest. Brooklyn had collected five runs. Frankhouse issued six bases on balls and Jimmy Bucher made an error behind him but no Cincinnati runner reached third. Holding the Reds without a hit was totally out of character for Frankhouse. (This accomplishment was recognized until 1991, when MLB Commissioner Fay Vincent changed the official definition of a no hitter, declaring it a game of nine innings or more that ends with no hits). With Brooklyn in 1937, the curveballer outdueled Carl Hubbell to snap the latter's record 24-game winning streak. Frankhouse was traded by the Brooklyn Dodgers to the Boston Bees for Joe Stripp on December 13, 1938.

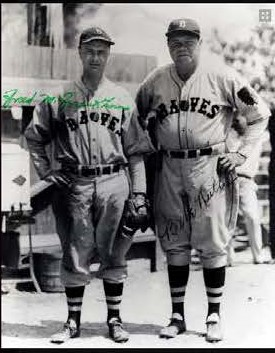
Fred Frankhouse and Babe Ruth

=== Boston Bees ===
Boston magnate, Bob Quinn, along with Casey Stengel, negotiated with the Brooklyn Dodgers to re-acquire Frankhouse, now 35. In spite of the veteran pitcher's age, Quinn and Stengel were convinced that "he needs the wafts of [our] invigorating northeast breezes to do his best …" On December 13, 1938, in a trade for Joe Stripp, Frankhouse returned to Boston, now known as the Boston Bees, for his final year in professional baseball. In his last year as a Major League Baseball pitcher, on May 17, 1939, Frankhouse beans Harry Craft of the Reds. In another incident during the series against the Reds, National League president Fred Frick warned Frankhouse that he would be suspended for ten games should he be found attempting to use an illegal "spitter" again. Frankhouse was released by the Boston Bees on January 23, 1940.

=== Returning to the Minor League ===
During his career, Frankhouse appeared in 402 major league games, 216 of them as a starting pitcher. He compiled 106 wins and 97 losses and had 81 complete games.

Frankhouse played his last Major League game on September 25, 1939 as a pitcher for the Boston Bees. He was officially released by Boston on January 23, 1940, so that he could take a coaching-pitching position. Frankhouse returned to the Minor Leagues and pitched for two New York Yankees farm club teams, the International League Newark Bears (1940–41), and the American Association Kansas City Blues (1942). After Frankhouse's first season as coach-pitcher with Newark, the Bears announced they would re-sign Frankhouse to a second season. Although the minor league organization believed Frankhouse, now 37, would be a capable relief pitcher, he took a position as coach and general assistant to manager Johnny Neun. In January 1942, the Newark Bears organization announced that Frankhouse had been transferred to the Kansas City Blues to assist former Newark Bears manager, now Blues pilot Johnny Neun.

=== Life after baseball ===
Frankhouse enlisted in the Army during World War II after leaving baseball. After serving four years, Frankhouse was discharged with the rank of captain in the Transportation Corps. Casey Stengel wanted Frankhouse to work for him as a pitching scout, but Frankhouse chose to return to Juniata County with his wife Mabel. After returning to Port Royal, Pennsylvania. Frankhouse started a Little League Baseball program and coached a team. He was one of the first Christmas tree growers in the County and worked a short time for the Commonwealth.

On June 9, 1976, his home town honored him with Fred Frankhouse Appreciation Day, and the baseball field in Port Royal was named the "Frankhouse Field" in his honor. That same year he was inducted into the Pennsylvania Athletic Hall of Fame. Shortly after his death, Frankhouse's family created a baseball scholarship at Juniata High School to keep his memory alive and to support youngsters who play the game.

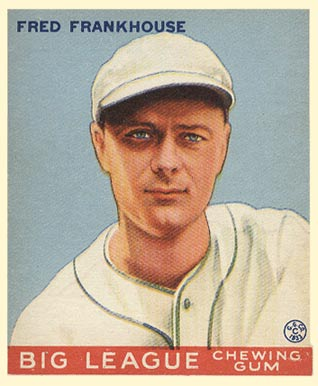

== MLB pitching statistics ==
Career	G	GS	GF	W	L	PCT	ERA	CG	SHO	SV	IP	BFP	H	ER	R	HR	BB	IBB	SO	WP	HBP	BK	HLD
13 Years	402	216	115	106	97	.522	3.92	81	10	12	1,888.0	8,287	2,033	822	969	111	701	-	622	32	43	6	-

Pitching statistics are from the online Baseball-Almanac.com. The pitching statistics at Baseball-Reference.com are in agreement except for the "game started" total, which is 213.

As a hitter, Frankhouse posted a .208 batting average (132-for-636) with 72 runs, 22 doubles, 1 home run, 58 RBI and 38 bases on balls. Defensively, he recorded a .961 fielding percentage.
