= Tom Winsett =

American baseball player (1909–1987)

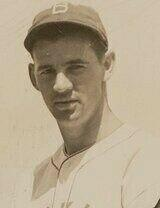
- Winsett with the Brooklyn Dodgers in 1938
- Outfielder
- Born: November 24, 1909; McKenzie, Tennessee, U.S.
- Died: July 20, 1987 (aged 77); Memphis, Tennessee, U.S.
- Batted: Left Threw: Right

MLB debut
- April 20, 1930, for the Boston Red Sox

Last MLB appearance
- May 1, 1938, for the Brooklyn Dodgers

MLB statistics
- Batting average: .237
- Home runs: 8
- Runs batted in: 76
- Stats at Baseball Reference

Teams
- Boston Red Sox (1930–31, 1933); St. Louis Cardinals (1935); Brooklyn Dodgers (1936–38)

John Thomas Winsett (November 24, 1909 – July 20, 1987) was an American professional baseball player. Nicknamed "Long Tom", he played all or part of seven seasons in Major League Baseball for the Boston Red Sox (1930–31, 1933), St. Louis Cardinals (1935) and Brooklyn Dodgers (1936–38), primarily as a left fielder. Winsett batted left-handed and threw right-handed. He was born in McKenzie, Tennessee.

In 1936, Winsett hit 50 home runs for the minor league Columbus Red Birds. He enjoyed his most productive major league season in 1937 with the Brooklyn Dodgers, when he posted career-highs in games played (118), runs (32), hits (83), doubles (15), triples (5), home runs (5) and runs batted in (42). Winsett was a .237 career hitter with eight home runs and 76 RBI in 118 games.

On April 25, 1938, he was the first baseball player to be featured on the cover of LIFE magazine, with an inside caption which read: "The rubber-legged batter on the cover is John Thomas Winsett, of McKenzie, Tenn. one of the most curious players on the most curious team in the major leagues. He plays right field for the Brooklyn National League Baseball Club, better known as the 'Daffy Dodgers' because of the way they play. First time Winsett batted in a big-league game he hit a homer, but shortly went back to the minors. The Dodgers paid $40,000 for him last year and Winsett hit a dismal .237. Both Dodgers and Winsett are expected to play better this year."

He died in Memphis, Tennessee, at the age of 77.
