= Nick Polly =

American baseball player (1917–1993)

- Third baseman
- Born: April 18, 1917; Chicago, Illinois, U.S.
- Died: January 17, 1993 (aged 75); Chicago, Illinois, U.S.
- Batted: Right Threw: Right

MLB debut
- September 11, 1937, for the Brooklyn Dodgers

Last MLB appearance
- May 20, 1945, for the Boston Red Sox

MLB statistics
- Batting average: .200
- Home runs: 0
- Runs batted in: 3
- Stats at Baseball Reference

Teams
- Brooklyn Dodgers (1937); Boston Red Sox (1945)

Nicholas Polly (born Nicholas Joseph Polachanin) (April 18, 1917 – January 17, 1993), was an American professional baseball player who played third base in the Major Leagues for the 1937 Brooklyn Dodgers and 1945 Boston Red Sox.
