= Frank Skaff =

American baseball player and manager (1910-1988)

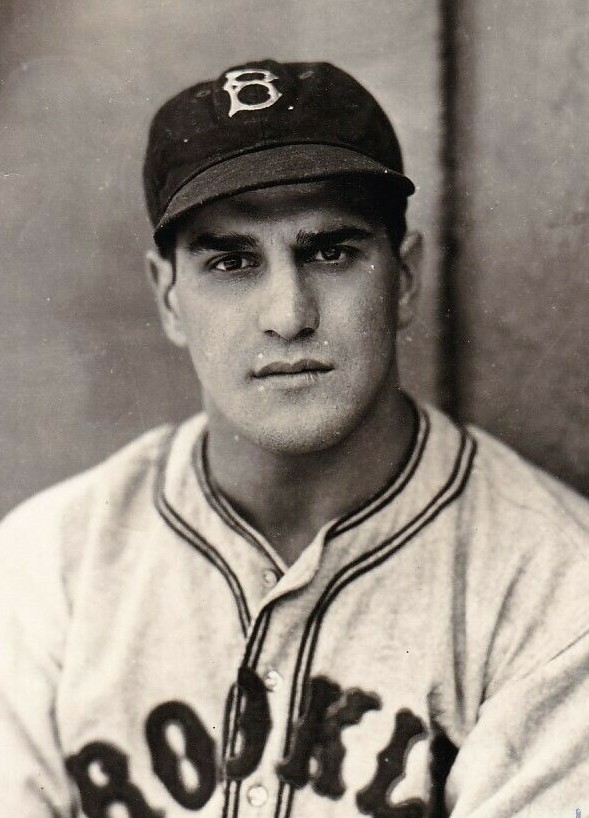
- First baseman / Manager
- Born: September 30, 1910; La Crosse, Wisconsin, U.S.
- Died: April 12, 1988 (aged 77); Towson, Maryland, U.S.
- Batted: Right Threw: Right

MLB debut
- September 11, 1935, for the Brooklyn Dodgers

Last MLB appearance
- October 3, 1943, for the Philadelphia Athletics

MLB statistics
- Batting average: .320
- Home runs: 1
- Runs batted in: 11
- Stats at Baseball Reference
- Managerial record at Baseball Reference

Teams
- As player: Brooklyn Dodgers (1935); Philadelphia Athletics (1943); As manager: Detroit Tigers (1966)

Francis Michael Skaff (September 30, 1910 – April 12, 1988) was an American Major League Baseball (MLB) infielder, coach, manager and scout. He played for the Brooklyn Dodgers in 1935 and for the Philadelphia Athletics in 1943, and served as acting manager of the Detroit Tigers for the latter half of the 1966 season after his two immediate predecessors in the post were stricken with terminal illnesses.

== Playing career ==
=== Amateur ===
Born in La Crosse, Wisconsin, Skaff's family moved to Lowell, Massachusetts in 1920, where Frank attended Lowell High School. He was captain of the school's football, basketball, and baseball teams, and graduated in 1929. He went on to attend Villanova University on a football scholarship, but an injury prevented his football-playing, and put him on a baseball scholarship instead. Skaff played third base for the Villanova nine, and graduated in 1935 with a degree in economics. While at Villanova in 1933, Skaff played summer baseball for Harwich of the Cape Cod Baseball League (CCBL), helping to lead the team to its first league title. A CCBL all-league selection as an outfielder, it was reported that Skaff "covers acres of territory, catches everything in sight," and was "the dread of all opposing pitchers".

=== Professional ===
Upon graduation, Skaff was signed by the Brooklyn Dodgers, and spent most of 1935 with the minor league Peoria Tractors. He was called up by Brooklyn late in the 1935 season, and appeared in six games for the Dodgers that year. Skaff's major league debut came on September 11 in the Dodgers' 7–4 loss to the Cincinnati Reds at Crosley Field, when he entered the game in the ninth inning to pinch-hit against Paul Derringer, and grounded out. Skaff went 2-for-3 with an RBI three days later as the Dodgers' third baseman in an 18–14 loss to the Chicago Cubs at Wrigley Field. In his six games with the Dodgers, Skaff was an impressive 6-for-11 at the plate with three RBI, and made one error in seven chances at third base.

Skaff spent the 1936–1941 seasons in the minors, and retired after the 1941 season. Working in the Portsmouth Naval Shipyard and playing semi-pro baseball, he was signed in 1943 by the Philadelphia Athletics. Skaff appeared in 32 games for the Athletics during their 1943 season, batting .281 in 71 plate appearances. His lone major league home run came on September 27 in the second game of a doubleheader against the St. Louis Browns, a grand slam off Al Hollingsworth that reportedly hit the roof at Shibe Park.

Skaff played for the Baltimore Orioles of the International League from 1944 to 1946, and was player-manager for the Montgomery Rebels through 1948, but never made another big-league appearance. Over his two major league seasons, Skaff hit .320 in 82 plate appearances.

== Coaching and scouting career ==
=== 1946–1965 ===
Skaff managed in the Athletics' farm system through 1953. During the off season, he was the head men's basketball coach at the University of Baltimore. He was a coach for the 1954 Orioles during their first American League season as the reborn St. Louis Browns, then joined the Tiger organization as a minor league skipper and scout. In 1965, he was named to the Tigers' MLB coaching staff.

=== Interim manager of 1966 Tigers ===
Skaff's turn as acting manager of the 1966 Tigers came as a result of the serious, ultimately fatal, illnesses of his two 1966 predecessors. On May 16, after 26 games, veteran manager Chuck Dressen suffered his second heart attack in as many seasons. As in 1965, third base coach Bob Swift took over the Tigers on an interim basis as Dressen recovered. After 57 games as the Tigers' manager, Swift was hospitalized during the July 11–13 All-Star break for what appeared to be a stomach ailment; however, his malady proved to be lung cancer and he was forced to immediately give up the reins.

Skaff, who had begun 1966 as Detroit's bench coach, then moved to third base under Swift, became the team's second acting manager of the season on July 14 and finished the campaign. The Tigers won only 40 of the 79 games Skaff managed, and finished third in the American League, nine games in arrears of the eventual world champion Orioles. Both Dressen and Swift would die during the year. Dressen, 71, appeared to be making a recovery in early August when he was stricken by a kidney infection; he died August 10. Swift, 51, succumbed to cancer on October 17, 1966.

=== 1967–1988 ===
On October 3, the Tigers hired Mayo Smith as manager for 1967, and Skaff moved into a scouting role. He never managed again in the majors (his 40–39 career record produced a winning percentage of .506), but returned to Detroit as a coach under Billy Martin in 1971.

Skaff was inducted into the Villanova University Varsity Club Hall of Fame in 1976, and the Lowell High School Athletic Hall of Fame in 1987. He retired from full-time scouting in 1983, but continued part-time until his death in 1988, which came while on a scouting trip for the Tigers in Towson, Maryland at age 77.

Sporting positions
Preceded by Bob Swift	Detroit Tigers third base coach 1966	Succeeded by Tony Cuccinello
Preceded by Wally Moses	Detroit Tigers first base coach 1971	Succeeded by Dick Tracewski
