= Art Parks =

American baseball player (1911-1989)

- Outfielder
- Born: November 1, 1911; Paris, Arkansas, U.S.
- Died: December 6, 1989 (aged 78); Little Rock, Arkansas, U.S.
- Batted: Left Threw: Right

MLB debut
- September 25, 1937, for the Brooklyn Dodgers

Last MLB appearance
- September 29, 1939, for the Brooklyn Dodgers

MLB statistics
- Batting Average: .275
- Home Runs: 1
- RBI: 19
- Stats at Baseball Reference

Teams
- Brooklyn Dodgers (1937, 1939)

Artie William Parks (November 1, 1911 – December 6, 1989) was an American outfielder in Major League Baseball. He played for the Brooklyn Dodgers during the 1937 and 1939 baseball seasons.
