= George Fallon (baseball) =

American baseball player (1914–1994)

- Second baseman / Shortstop
- Born: July 8, 1914; Jersey City, New Jersey, U.S.
- Died: October 25, 1994 (aged 80); Lake Worth, Florida, U.S.
- Batted: Right Threw: Right

MLB debut
- September 27, 1937, for the Brooklyn Dodgers

Last MLB appearance
- July 13, 1945, for the St. Louis Cardinals

MLB statistics
- Batting average: .216
- Home runs: 1
- Runs batted in: 21
- Stats at Baseball Reference

Teams
- Brooklyn Dodgers (1937); St. Louis Cardinals (1943–1945)

Career highlights and awards
- World Series champion (1944)

George Decatur Fallon (July 8, 1914 – October 25, 1994) was an American backup second baseman and shortstop in Major League Baseball who played for the Brooklyn Dodgers (1937) and St. Louis Cardinals (1943-1945). A native of Jersey City, New Jersey, Fallon batted and threw right-handed. He debuted on September 27, 1937, and played his final game on July 13, 1945.

In a four-season career, Fallon posted a .216 batting average (61-for-282) with one home run and 21 RBIs in 133 games played. One notable moment in Fallon's career—he was the first batter to face Cincinnati Reds pitcher Joe Nuxhall when the then 15-year-old Nuxhall made his major league debut on June 10, 1944. Nuxhall retired Fallon on a groundout.

Fallon worked for Remington Products for 25 years after baseball. He died at Lake Worth, Florida on October 25, 1994 after a long illness at age 80.

== Bibliography ==
- Baseball A Doubleheader Collection of Facts, Feats, & Firsts. St. Louis, Mo.: The Sporting News Publishing Co. 1992. ISBN 0-88365-785-6..
