= Buster Mills =

American baseball player (1908–1991)

- Outfielder
- Born: September 16, 1908; Ranger, Texas, U.S.
- Died: December 1, 1991 (aged 83); Arlington, Texas, U.S.
- Batted: Right Threw: Right

MLB debut
- April 18, 1934, for the St. Louis Cardinals

Last MLB appearance
- June 1, 1946, for the Cleveland Indians

MLB statistics
- Batting average: .287
- Home runs: 14
- Runs batted in: 163
- Stats at Baseball Reference

Teams
- As player: St. Louis Cardinals (1934); Brooklyn Dodgers (1935); Boston Red Sox (1937); St. Louis Browns (1938); New York Yankees (1940); Cleveland Indians (1942, 1946); As manager: Cincinnati Redlegs (1953)

Colonel Buster Mills (September 16, 1908 – December 1, 1991) was an American outfielder, coach, scout and interim manager in Major League Baseball. A native of Ranger, Texas, in his playing days, he stood 5 ft 11 1/2 in (1.82 m) (181.6 cm) tall, weighed 195 pounds (88.5 kg), and threw and batted righthanded.

Mills' father, Elvis, owned a general store in Ranger, Texas. Elvis and Lucy Mills gave their fourth child the first name of Colonel, after the rank of either Elvis' best friend or a Civil War great-uncle. (During World War II, he enjoyed introducing himself to officers as "Colonel Mills".) He lettered in football, basketball, track and baseball at the University of Oklahoma and was named all-Big Six quarterback. He graduated with a degree in geology in 1931.

A St. Louis Cardinals scout saw Mills hit for the cycle (including two doubles) in a baseball game against Washington University in St. Louis. However, when he asked for the player's name, he was told it was Wahl. The scout had to leave, but left a message to sign the (wrong) player. Mills signed with Cleveland, but ended up in the extensive St. Louis Cardinals farm system during the early 1930s, receiving a 29-game trial with the 1934 "Gashouse Gang" Cardinals and then a 17-game tryout with the 1935 Brooklyn Dodgers. He played the rest of his MLB career in the American League, for the Boston Red Sox, St. Louis Browns, New York Yankees and Cleveland Indians (1937–40; 1942; 1946). He was traded, along with Bobo Newsom and Red Kress, from the Red Sox to the Browns for Joe Vosmik on December 3, 1937. Overall, he played in 415 games, and compiled a lifetime batting average of .287 with 14 home runs and 163 runs batted in. In 1940, Mills batted .397 in 63 at bats for the Yankees, largely as a pinch hitter.

After military service in World War II, Mills became a coach for the Indians (1946), Chicago White Sox (1947–50), Cincinnati Redlegs (1953) and Red Sox (1954) and managed in minor league baseball. He was the interim manager of the 1953 Redlegs, finishing the unexpired term of Rogers Hornsby, who resigned late in the season. Mills' record in Cincinnati was 4–4 (.500).

After his coaching career, Mills spent many seasons as a scout for the Kansas City Athletics, then the Yankees.

Mills died in Arlington, Texas, at the age of 83.

== Managerial record ==
Team	Year	Regular season				
Team	Year	Games	Won	Lost	Win %	Finish
CIN	1953	8	4	4	.500	6th in NL
CIN total		8	4	4	.500	
Total		8	4	4	.500	

Sporting positions
Preceded by Ski Melillo	Boston Red Sox third-base coach 1954	Succeeded by Jack Burns
