= Bert Miller (baseball) =

American baseball player (1875–1937)

- Pitcher
- Born: October 28, 1875; Riley, Michigan, U.S.
- Died: June 14, 1937 (aged 61); Flint, Michigan, U.S.
- Batted: Unknown Threw: Unknown

MLB debut
- July 15, 1897, for the Louisville Colonels

Last MLB appearance
- August 3, 1897, for the Louisville Colonels

MLB statistics
- Win–loss record: 0–1
- Earned run average: 7.94
- Strikeouts: 3
- Stats at Baseball Reference

Teams
- Louisville Colonels (1897)

Herbert Alexander Miller (October 28, 1875 – June 14, 1937) was an American Major League Baseball pitcher. He played in the National League for the 1897 Louisville Colonels.
