= Gordie Sundin =

American baseball player (1937-2016)

- Pitcher
- Born: October 10, 1937; Minneapolis, Minnesota, U.S.
- Died: May 2, 2016 (aged 78); Naples, Florida, U.S.
- Batted: Right Threw: Right

MLB debut
- September 19, 1956, for the Baltimore Orioles

Last MLB appearance
- September 19, 1956, for the Baltimore Orioles

MLB statistics
- Win–loss record: 0–0
- Earned run average: ∞ (infinity)
- Games played: 1
- Innings: 0
- Stats at Baseball Reference

Teams
- Baltimore Orioles (1956)

Gordon Vincent Sundin (October 10, 1937 – May 2, 2016) was an American professional baseball player. He was a right-handed pitcher whose career lasted for six seasons (1955–1959; 1961), but who made only one appearance in Major League Baseball — failing to record an out — for the 1956 Baltimore Orioles. Sundin batted right-handed, stood 6 feet 4 inches (1.93 m) tall, and weighed 215 pounds (98 kg).

Sundin's lone MLB appearance came on Wednesday, September 19, 1956, at Briggs Stadium against the Detroit Tigers. Baltimore was already behind, 8–1, when Sundin, three weeks shy of his 19th birthday, came into the game in the bottom half of the eighth inning. He faced two batters — Tiger pitcher Frank Lary and Harvey Kuenn — and issued two bases on balls. He started in on a third batter, nearly knocking down Jack Phillips with an errant pitch, before he was relieved by Billy O'Dell without completing the Phillips at-bat. One report credited Sundin with throwing eleven straight balls, though Sundin himself insisted “I got a strike in there somewhere.”

Lary would later score an earned run charged against Sundin (giving the Baltimore pitcher an earned run average of infinity per baseball's statistics).

Sundin's catcher for that game was Tom Gastall, who entered the game with Sundin in the middle of the eighth. The next day, Gastall was killed in a plane crash.

Sundin compiled a 14–23 win-loss record and a 5.86 ERA in 5 seasons of minor league baseball, retiring in 1961 at the age of 23.
