= Frank Lamanske =

American baseball player (1906-1971)

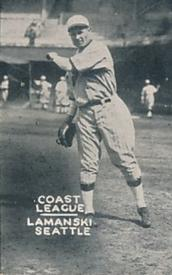
- Pitcher
- Born: September 30, 1906; Oglesby, Illinois, U.S.
- Died: August 4, 1971 (aged 64); Olney, Illinois, U.S.
- Batted: Left Threw: Left

MLB debut
- April 27, 1935, for the Brooklyn Dodgers

Last MLB appearance
- May 1, 1935, for the Brooklyn Dodgers

MLB statistics
- Win–loss record: 0–0
- Earned run average: 7.36
- Strikeouts: 1
- Stats at Baseball Reference

Teams
- Brooklyn Dodgers (1935)

Frank James Lamanske (September 30, 1906 – August 4, 1971), nicknamed "Lefty", was an American pitcher in Major League Baseball, who appeared in two games for the 1935 Brooklyn Dodgers, working 3 2/3 innings and allowing five hits and three runs.
