= Les Munns =

American baseball player (1908–1997)

- Pitcher
- Born: December 1, 1908; Fort Bragg, California, U.S.
- Died: February 28, 1997 (aged 88); Cedar Rapids, Iowa, U.S.
- Batted: Right Threw: Right

MLB debut
- April 22, 1934, for the Brooklyn Dodgers

Last MLB appearance
- July 14, 1936, for the St. Louis Cardinals

MLB statistics
- Win–loss record: 4–13
- Earned run average: 4.76
- Strikeouts: 58
- Stats at Baseball Reference

Teams
- Brooklyn Dodgers (1934–1935); St. Louis Cardinals (1936)

Leslie Ernest Munns (December 1, 1908 – February 28, 1997) was an American pitcher in Major League Baseball. He pitched from 1934 to 1936 for the Brooklyn Dodgers and St. Louis Cardinals. He played in the short-lived Twin Ports League in 1943.

Born in Fort Bragg, California, Munns died in Cedar Rapids, Iowa, on February 28, 1997, aged 88.
