= Bobby Reis =

American baseball player (1909-1973)

- Pitcher/Outfielder
- Born: January 2, 1909; Woodside, New York
- Died: May 1, 1973 (aged 64); Saint Paul, Minnesota
- Batted: Right Threw: Right

MLB debut
- September 7, 1931, for the Brooklyn Robins

Last MLB appearance
- September 21, 1938, for the Boston Bees

MLB statistics
- Win–loss record: 10–13
- Earned run average: 4.27
- Strikeouts: 52
- Stats at Baseball Reference

Teams
- Brooklyn Robins / Dodgers (1931–1932, 1935); Boston Bees (1936–1938)

Robert Joseph Thomas Reis (January 2, 1909 – May 1, 1973), was a professional baseball player who played pitcher and outfield from 1931 to 1938 with the Brooklyn Robins/Dodgers and Boston Bees. He also played for the Saint Paul Saints in Minnesota.

Born in Woodside, New York, Reis died in St. Paul, Minnesota on May 1, 1973, aged 64. He was buried in Willow River Cemetery in Hudson, Wisconsin.
