= Joe Vosmik =

American baseball player (1910–1962)

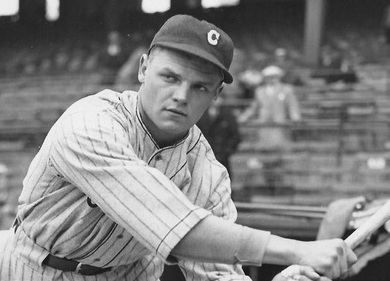
- Vosmik, circa 1931
- Left fielder
- Born: April 4, 1910; Cleveland, Ohio, U.S.
- Died: January 27, 1962 (aged 51); Cleveland, Ohio, U.S.
- Batted: Right Threw: Right

MLB debut
- September 30, 1930, for the Cleveland Indians

Last MLB appearance
- July 23, 1944, for the Washington Senators

MLB statistics
- Batting average: .307
- Home runs: 65
- Runs batted in: 874
- Stats at Baseball Reference

Teams
- Cleveland Indians (1930–1936); St. Louis Browns (1937); Boston Red Sox (1938–1939); Brooklyn Dodgers (1940–1941); Washington Senators (1944)

Career highlights and awards
- All-Star (1935)

Joseph Franklin Vosmik (April 4, 1910 – January 27, 1962) was an American professional baseball outfielder. He played in Major League Baseball (MLB) for the Cleveland Indians (1930–1936), St. Louis Browns (1937), Boston Red Sox (1938–1939), Brooklyn Dodgers (1940–1941) and Washington Senators (1944). He was a member of the 1941 Brooklyn Dodgers, appearing in 25 games with just 56 at-bats, but did not play in the 1941 World Series.

He was voted in the 1935 American League All-Star Team as a right fielder. He finished 3rd in voting for the 1935 AL MVP Award for leading the league in hits (216), doubles (47) and triples (20). He also played in 152 games and had 620 at-bats, 93 runs, 10 home runs, 110 RBIs, 2 stolen bases, 59 walks, a .348 batting average, a .408 on-base percentage, a .537 slugging percentage, 333 total bases, and 5 sacrifice hits. He was traded from the Browns to the Red Sox for Bobo Newsom, Red Kress and Buster Mills on December 3, 1937. He finished 21st in voting for the 1938 AL MVP Award for leading the league in hits (201), playing in 146 games, and having 621 at-bats, 121 runs, 37 doubles, 6 triples, 9 home runs, 86 RBIs, 59 walks, a .324 batting average, a .384 on-base percentage, a .446 slugging percentage, 277 total bases, and 7 sacrifice hits.

In 13 seasons, he played in 1,414 games and had 5,472 at-bats, 818 runs, 1,682 hits, 335 doubles, 92 triples, 65 home runs, 874 RBIs, 23 stolen bases, 514 walks, a .307 batting average, a .369 on-base percentage, a .438 slugging percentage, 2,396 total bases, and 78 sacrifice hits. His career fielding percentage was .979 playing at all three outfield positions.

Vosmik compiled 2 five-hit games and 32 four-hit games in his major league career.

From 1947 to 1951, he was a manager in the minor league system of the Indians.

He died in his hometown of Cleveland, Ohio at the age of 51.

== See also ==
- List of Major League Baseball annual doubles leaders
- List of Major League Baseball annual triples leaders
