= Ralph Onis =

American baseball player (1908-1995)

- Catcher
- Born: October 24, 1908; Tampa, Florida, U.S.
- Died: January 4, 1995 (aged 86); Tampa, Florida, U.S.
- Batted: Right Threw: Right

MLB debut
- April 27, 1935, for the Brooklyn Dodgers

Last MLB appearance
- April 27, 1935, for the Brooklyn Dodgers

MLB statistics
- Batting average: 1.000
- Home runs: 0
- Runs batted in: 0
- Stats at Baseball Reference

Teams
- Brooklyn Dodgers (1935)

Manuel Dominguez "Ralph" Onis (October 24, 1908 – January 4, 1995), nicknamed "Curly", was an American professional baseball player who played catcher in one game for the Brooklyn Dodgers on April 27, 1935. Onis singled in his only at-bat for a rare career batting average of 1.000.

His parents were born in Asturias, Spain, and he is buried in the Centro Asturiano de Tampa.

Onis managed in the Florida State League in 1939 and 1940.
