= Harry Eisenstat =

American baseball player (1915–2003)

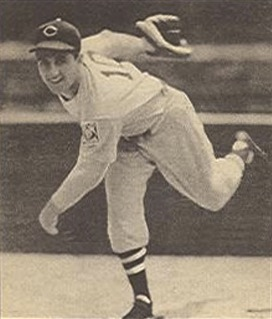
- Pitcher
- Born: October 10, 1915; Brooklyn, New York, U.S.
- Died: March 21, 2003 (aged 87); Beachwood, Ohio, U.S.
- Batted: Left Threw: Left

MLB debut
- May 19, 1935, for the Brooklyn Dodgers

Last MLB appearance
- September 25, 1942, for the Cleveland Indians

MLB statistics
- Win–loss record: 25–27
- Earned run average: 3.89
- Strikeouts: 157
- Stats at Baseball Reference

Teams
- Brooklyn Dodgers (1935–1937); Detroit Tigers (1938–1939); Cleveland Indians (1939–1942)

Harry Eisenstat (October 10, 1915 – March 21, 2003) was an American professional baseball pitcher who played in Major League Baseball for the Brooklyn Dodgers, Detroit Tigers, and Cleveland Indians from 1935 to 1942.

== Early life ==
Eisenstat was born in Brooklyn, New York, and was Jewish. He attended James Madison High School in Brooklyn, New York, where, in 2008, he was inducted into its prestigious Wall of Distinction.

== Career ==
He pitched for the Brooklyn Dodgers, Detroit Tigers, and Cleveland Indians. Eisenstat was 19 years old when he broke into the big leagues on May 19, 1935, with the Brooklyn Dodgers, the third-youngest player in the National League. In his Major League debut, he gave up 5 runs over 2 2/3 innings in a 9–6 loss to the Pittsburgh Pirates. On October 4, 1937, he was granted free agency and signed with the Detroit Tigers.

Eisenstat is best known for, while pitching for the Detroit Tigers in the first game of a doubleheader on the last day of the 1938 season, beating Bob Feller of the Cleveland Indians 4–1 despite Feller setting the Major League record for most strikeouts in a game (18). Earlier that season, he won both ends of a doubleheader in relief against the Philadelphia Athletics while teammate Hank Greenberg hit two home runs, causing their Tigers Manager, Mickey Cochrane, to warn the two of them to stay in their rooms that night because "the Jews in Detroit are going crazy." Eisenstat is recognized as the only pitcher in Major League history to receive credit for two wins in one day: one as a starter and one as a relief pitcher.

In 1938 his four saves were sixth-most in the National League. The next season, Eisenstat was traded to the Cleveland Indians for future Hall-of-Famer outfielder Earl Averill. In 1938 his four saves were eighth-most in the National League. He finished his professional baseball career with the Indians.

Due to World War II, Eisenstat enlisted in the Army in 1942, ending his career in the MLB. Through 2010, he was 9th all-time in career ERA (3.80; directly behind Harry Feldman) among Jewish MLB players.

== Later life ==
After the war, Eisenstat moved to Shaker Heights, Ohio, and opened a hardware store.

In 1993, Eisenstat was inducted into the Michigan Jewish Sports Hall of Fame. After his death in 2003, his papers were donated to the Western Reserve Historical Society in Cleveland, Ohio.

== See also ==
- List of Jewish Major League Baseball players
