= Harvey Green =

American baseball player (1915-1970)

- Pitcher
- Born: February 9, 1915; Kenosha, Wisconsin, U.S.
- Died: July 24, 1970 (aged 55); Franklin, Louisiana, U.S.
- Batted: Switch Threw: Right

MLB debut
- September 12, 1935, for the Brooklyn Dodgers

Last MLB appearance
- September 14, 1935, for the Brooklyn Dodgers

MLB statistics
- Win–loss record: 0–0
- Earned run average: 9.00
- Strikeouts: 0
- Stats at Baseball Reference

Teams
- Brooklyn Dodgers (1935)

Harvey George Green (February 9, 1915 – July 24, 1970), nicknamed "Buck", was an American right-handed pitcher in Major League Baseball.

Green played basketball, soccer, and baseball, and ran track, in high school before he was recruited as a pitcher. He pitched in two games for the 1935 Brooklyn Dodgers, working one inning, and allowing two hits and one run.
