= Nick Tremark =

American baseball player (1912–2000)

- Outfielder
- Born: October 15, 1912; Yonkers, New York, U.S.
- Died: September 7, 2000 (aged 87); Tomball, Texas, U.S.
- Batted: Left Threw: Left

MLB debut
- August 9, 1934, for the Brooklyn Dodgers

Last MLB appearance
- September 26, 1936, for the Brooklyn Dodgers

MLB statistics
- Batting average: .247
- Home runs: 0
- Runs batted in: 10
- Stats at Baseball Reference

Teams
- Brooklyn Dodgers (1934–1936)

Nicholas Joseph Tremark (October 15, 1912 – September 7, 2000) was an American Major League Baseball outfielder for the Brooklyn Dodgers. He played from 1934 to 1936. He attended Manhattan College. Prior to his Major League debut, Tremark starred as an outfielder for the 1932 Paterson Pros in Hinchliffe Stadium's first season. In the first baseball game at Hinchliffe Stadium on July 24, 1932, Tremark was the first batter to represent a Paterson home team in the stadium's history. He was the Patterson Pros' lead-off hitter and started in center field.
