= Jim Bucher =

American baseball player (1911–2004)

- Third baseman / Second baseman
- Born: March 24, 1911; Manassas, Virginia, U.S.
- Died: October 21, 2004 (aged 93); Elizabethtown, Pennsylvania, U.S.
- Batted: Left Threw: Right

MLB debut
- April 18, 1934, for the Brooklyn Dodgers

Last MLB appearance
- September 29, 1945, for the Boston Red Sox

MLB statistics
- Batting average: .265
- Home runs: 17
- Runs batted in: 193
- Stats at Baseball Reference

Teams
- Brooklyn Dodgers (1934–1937); St. Louis Cardinals (1938); Boston Red Sox (1944–1945)

James Quinter Bucher (March 24, 1911 – October 21, 2004) was an American infielder and outfielder in Major League Baseball who played for the Brooklyn Dodgers (1934–1937), St. Louis Cardinals (1938) and Boston Red Sox (1944–1945). A native of Manassas, Virginia, Bucher batted left-handed and threw right-handed. He debuted on April 18, 1934 and played his final game on September 29, 1945.

Bucher was a defensively versatile player with decent abilities at third base, second, and any of the three outfield positions. His most productive season came with the 1935 Dodgers, when he posted career-highs in batting average (.302), home runs (7), RBI (58), runs (72), hits (143), doubles (22), and games played (123). In 1937, he was sent to the Cardinals along with Johnny Cooney in the same trade that brought Leo Durocher to Brooklyn. He ended his majors career with the Boston Red Sox.

In a seven-season career, Bucher was a .265 hitter with 17 home runs and 193 RBI in 554 games. Bucher died in Elizabethtown, Pennsylvania, at age 93.
