= Tom Baker (1930s pitcher) =

American baseball player (1913–1991)

- Pitcher
- Born: June 11, 1913; Nursery, Texas, U.S.
- Died: January 3, 1991 (aged 77); Fort Worth, Texas, U.S.
- Batted: Right Threw: Right

MLB debut
- August 15, 1935, for the Brooklyn Dodgers

Last MLB appearance
- September 24, 1938, for the New York Giants

MLB statistics
- Win–loss record: 3–9
- Earned run average: 4.73
- Strikeouts: 58
- Stats at Baseball Reference

Teams
- Brooklyn Dodgers (1935–1937); New York Giants (1937–1938)

Thomas Calvin Baker (June 11, 1913 – January 3, 1991), nicknamed "Rattlesnake", was an American Major League Baseball player. He was a pitcher for four seasons (1935–38) with the Brooklyn Dodgers and New York Giants.

Baker died in 1991 and was interred at Greenwood Memorial Park in Fort Worth, Texas along with Pete Donohue and Jackie Tavener.
