= Joe Stripp =

American baseball player (1903–1989)

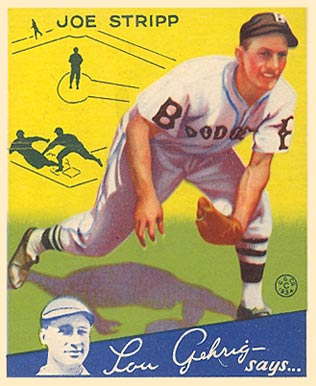
- Third baseman
- Born: February 3, 1903; Harrison, New Jersey, U.S.
- Died: June 10, 1989 (aged 86); Orlando, Florida, U.S.
- Batted: Right Threw: Right

MLB debut
- July 2, 1928, for the Cincinnati Reds

Last MLB appearance
- October 2, 1938, for the Boston Bees

MLB statistics
- Batting average: .294
- Home runs: 24
- Runs batted in: 464
- Stats at Baseball Reference

Teams
- Cincinnati Reds (1928–1931); Brooklyn Dodgers (1932–1937); St. Louis Cardinals (1938); Boston Bees (1938)

Joseph Valentine Stripp (February 3, 1903 – June 10, 1989) was an American professional baseball third baseman. He played in Major League Baseball (MLB) for the Cincinnati Reds, Brooklyn Dodgers, St. Louis Cardinals, and Boston Bees between 1928 and 1938. Stripp hit .300 or better 6 times, with a career best .324 with the Reds in 1931.

In 1146 games over 11 seasons, Stripp posted a .294 batting average (1238-for-4211) with 575 runs, 219 doubles, 43 triples, 24 home runs, 464 RBI, 50 stolen bases, 280 bases on balls, .340 on-base percentage and .384 slugging percentage. He finished his career with a .972 fielding percentage playing primarily at first and third base.

He died, aged 86, in Orlando, Florida.
