= 1936 Brooklyn Dodgers season =

1936 Brooklyn Dodgers
- League: National League
- Ballpark: Ebbets Field
- City: Brooklyn, New York
- Record: 67–87 (.435)
- League place: 7th
- Owners: Stephen McKeever, Brooklyn Trust Company
- President: Stephen McKeever
- Managers: Casey Stengel

The 1936 Brooklyn Dodgers fired manager Casey Stengel after another dismal campaign, which saw the team finish in sixth place.

== Offseason ==
- December 12, 1935: Tony Cuccinello, Al López, Ray Benge and Bobby Reis were traded to the Boston Bees for Ed Brandt and Randy Moore.
- February 6, 1936: Johnny Babich and Gene Moore were traded by the Dodgers to the Boston Bees for Fred Frankhouse.
- February 20, 1936: Sam Leslie was purchased from the Dodgers by the New York Giants.
- February 20, 1936: Johnny McCarthy, Buzz Boyle and cash were traded by the Dodgers to the New York Yankees for Buddy Hassett.
- March 31, 1936: Wally Millies was purchased from the Dodgers by the Washington Senators.

== Regular season ==
=== Season standings ===
National League
Team	W	L	Pct.	GB	Home	Road
New York Giants	92	62	.597	—	52‍–‍26	40‍–‍36
St. Louis Cardinals	87	67	.565	5	43‍–‍33	44‍–‍34
Chicago Cubs	87	67	.565	5	50‍–‍27	37‍–‍40
Pittsburgh Pirates	84	70	.545	8	46‍–‍30	38‍–‍40
Cincinnati Reds	74	80	.481	18	42‍–‍34	32‍–‍46
Boston Bees	71	83	.461	21	35‍–‍43	36‍–‍40
Brooklyn Dodgers	67	87	.435	25	37‍–‍40	30‍–‍47
Philadelphia Phillies	54	100	.351	38	30‍–‍48	24‍–‍52

=== Record vs. opponents ===
1936 National League record Sources:
Team	BSN	BRO	CHC	CIN	NYG	PHI	PIT	STL
Boston	—	10–12–2	6–16	13–9	9–13	12–10	8–14–1	13–9
Brooklyn	12–10–2	—	7–15	9–13	9–13	12–10	9–13	9–13
Chicago	16–6	15–7	—	10–12	11–11	16–6	10–12	9–13
Cincinnati	9–13	13–9	12–10	—	9–13	13–9	8–14	10–12
New York	13–9	13–9	11–11	13–9	—	17–5	15–7	10–12
Philadelphia	10–12	10–12	6–16	9–13	5–17	—	7–15	7–15
Pittsburgh	14–8–1	13–9	12–10	14–8	7–15	15–7	—	9–13–1
St. Louis	9–13	13–9	13–9	12–10	12–10	15–7	13–9–1	—

=== Notable transactions ===
- April 2, 1936: Wayne Osborne was purchased from the Dodgers by the Boston Bees.
- July 15, 1936: George Earnshaw was traded by the Dodgers to the St. Louis Cardinals for a player to be named later. The Cardinals completed the deal by sending Eddie Morgan to the Dodgers on October 1.
- August 1, 1936: The Dodgers traded players to be named later to the St. Louis Cardinals for Tom Winsett. The Dodgers completed the deal by sending Frenchy Bordagaray, Dutch Leonard and Jimmy Jordan to the Cardinals on December 3.

=== Roster ===
1936 Brooklyn Dodgers
Roster
Pitchers: 22 Tom Baker; 25 Ed Brandt; 30 Max Butcher; 17 Watty Clark; 7 George Earnshaw; 14 Harry Eisenstat; 26 Fred Frankhouse; 23 George Jeffcoat; 27 Dutch Leonard; 16 Van Mungo; 34 Hank Winston; -- Tom Zachary	Catchers: 10 Ray Berres; 21 Sid Gautreaux; 19 Babe Phelps; Infielders: 2 Jim Bucher; 8 Lonny Frey; 5 Ben Geraghty; 6 Buddy Hassett; -- Johnny Hudson; 12 Jimmy Jordan; 5 Jack Radtke; 3 Joe Stripp	Outfielders: 4 Frenchy Bordagaray; 15 Johnny Cooney; 14 Ox Eckhardt; 1 Freddie Lindstrom; 24 Randy Moore; 18 Dick Siebert; 9 Danny Taylor; 28 Nick Tremark; 11 George Watkins; 31 Eddie Wilson	Manager: 31 Casey Stengel; Coaches: 32 Otto Miller

== Player stats ==
=== Batting ===
==== Starters by position ====
Note: Pos = Position; G = Games played; AB = At bats; H = Hits; Avg. = Batting average; HR = Home runs; RBI = Runs batted in

Pos	Player	G	AB	H	Avg.	HR	RBI
C	Ray Berres	105	267	64	.240	1	13
1B	Buddy Hassett	156	635	197	.310	3	82
2B	Jimmy Jordan	115	398	93	.234	2	28
3B	Joe Stripp	110	439	139	.317	1	60
SS	Lonny Frey	148	524	146	.279	4	60
OF	Johnny Cooney	130	507	143	.282	0	30
OF	George Watkins	105	364	93	.255	4	43
OF	Frenchy Bordagaray	125	372	117	.315	4	31

==== Other batters ====
Note: G = Games played; AB = At bats; H = Hits; Avg. = Batting average; HR = Home runs; RBI = Runs batted in

Player	G	AB	H	Avg.	HR	RBI
Jim Bucher	110	370	93	.251	2	41
Babe Phelps	115	319	117	.367	5	57
Eddie Wilson	52	173	60	.347	3	25
Ben Geraghty	51	129	25	.194	0	9
Danny Taylor	43	116	34	.293	2	15
Freddie Lindstrom	26	106	28	.264	0	10
Randy Moore	42	88	21	.239	0	14
Tom Winsett	22	85	20	.235	1	18
Sid Gautreaux	75	71	19	.268	0	16
Ox Eckhardt	16	44	8	.182	1	6
Nick Tremark	8	32	8	.250	0	1
Jack Radtke	33	31	3	.097	0	2
Johnny Hudson	6	12	2	.167	0	0
Dick Siebert	2	2	0	.000	0	0

=== Pitching ===
==== Starting pitchers ====
Note: G = Games pitched; IP = Innings pitched; W = Wins; L = Losses; ERA = Earned run average; SO = Strikeouts

Player	G	IP	W	L	ERA	SO
Van Mungo	45	311.2	18	19	3.35	238
Fred Frankhouse	41	234.1	13	10	3.65	84
Ed Brandt	38	234.0	11	13	3.50	104
George Earnshaw	19	93.0	4	9	5.32	40

==== Other pitchers ====
Note: G = Games pitched; IP = Innings pitched; W = Wins; L = Losses; ERA = Earned run average; SO = Strikeouts

Player	G	IP	W	L	ERA	SO
Max Butcher	38	147.2	6	6	3.96	55
Watty Clark	33	120.0	7	11	4.43	28
Tom Baker	35	87.2	1	8	4.72	35
Harry Eisenstat	5	14.1	1	2	5.65	5

==== Relief pitchers ====
Note: G = Games pitched; W = Wins; L = Losses; SV = Saves; ERA = Earned run average; SO = Strikeouts

Player	G	W	L	SV	ERA	SO
George Jeffcoat	40	5	6	3	4.52	46
Dutch Leonard	16	0	0	1	3.66	8
Hank Winston	14	1	3	0	6.12	8
Tom Zachary	1	0	0	0	54.00	0

== Awards and honors ==
- 1936 Major League Baseball All-Star Game
  - Van Mungo reserve

== Farm System ==
Level	Team	League	Manager
A	Allentown Brooks	New York–Pennsylvania League	Bruno Betzel
A	Davenport Blue Sox	Western League	Cletus Dixon
C	Greenwood Dodgers	Cotton States League	Frank Brazill
D	Jeanerette Blues	Evangeline League	Emmett Lipscomb
D	Mayfield Clothiers	Kentucky–Illinois–Tennessee League	Lester L. Sweetland; W. M. Robinson; Rip Wheeler
D	Beatrice Blues	Nebraska State League	Sonny Brookhaus

LEAGUE CHAMPIONS: Davenport, Greenwood
