= 1936 St. Louis Cardinals season =

Major League Baseball season

1936 St. Louis Cardinals
- League: National League
- Ballpark: Sportsman's Park
- City: St. Louis, Missouri
- Record: 87–67 (.565)
- League place: 2nd
- Owners: Sam Breadon
- General managers: Branch Rickey
- Managers: Frankie Frisch
- Radio: KMOX (France Laux); KWK (Ray Schmidt, Johnny O'Hara, George Sisler)

The 1936 St. Louis Cardinals season was the team's 55th season in St. Louis, Missouri and its 45th season in the National League. The Cardinals went 87–67 during the season and finished second in the National League.

== Regular season ==
=== Season standings ===
National League
Team	W	L	Pct.	GB	Home	Road
New York Giants	92	62	.597	—	52‍–‍26	40‍–‍36
St. Louis Cardinals	87	67	.565	5	43‍–‍33	44‍–‍34
Chicago Cubs	87	67	.565	5	50‍–‍27	37‍–‍40
Pittsburgh Pirates	84	70	.545	8	46‍–‍30	38‍–‍40
Cincinnati Reds	74	80	.481	18	42‍–‍34	32‍–‍46
Boston Bees	71	83	.461	21	35‍–‍43	36‍–‍40
Brooklyn Dodgers	67	87	.435	25	37‍–‍40	30‍–‍47
Philadelphia Phillies	54	100	.351	38	30‍–‍48	24‍–‍52

=== Record vs. opponents ===
1936 National League record Sources:
Team	BSN	BRO	CHC	CIN	NYG	PHI	PIT	STL
Boston	—	10–12–2	6–16	13–9	9–13	12–10	8–14–1	13–9
Brooklyn	12–10–2	—	7–15	9–13	9–13	12–10	9–13	9–13
Chicago	16–6	15–7	—	10–12	11–11	16–6	10–12	9–13
Cincinnati	9–13	13–9	12–10	—	9–13	13–9	8–14	10–12
New York	13–9	13–9	11–11	13–9	—	17–5	15–7	10–12
Philadelphia	10–12	10–12	6–16	9–13	5–17	—	7–15	7–15
Pittsburgh	14–8–1	13–9	12–10	14–8	7–15	15–7	—	9–13–1
St. Louis	9–13	13–9	13–9	12–10	12–10	15–7	13–9–1	—

=== Notable transactions ===
- May 24, 1936: Johnny Vergez was purchased by the Cardinals from the Philadelphia Phillies.

=== Roster ===
1936 St. Louis Cardinals roster
Roster
Pitchers: 22 Bill Cox; 17 Dizzy Dean; 21 Paul Dean; 33 George Earnshaw; 16 Jesse Haines; 22 Bill Hallahan; 14 Ed Heusser; 18 Si Johnson; 24 Bill McGee; 24 Les Munns; 15 Roy Parmelee; 20 Cotton Pippen; 20 Nels Potter; 19 Flint Rhem; 19 Mike Ryba; 18 Bill Walker; 27 Jim Winford	Catchers: 8 Spud Davis; 9 Bruce Ogrodowski; Infielders: 21 Walter Alston; 29 Pat Ankenman; 12 Ripper Collins; 2 Leo Durocher; 3 Frankie Frisch; 30 Art Garibaldi; 4 Charlie Gelbert; 22 Don Gutteridge; 6 Stu Martin; 10 Johnny Mize; 30 Heinie Schuble; 30 Johnny Vergez	Outfielders: 31 Chick Fullis; 5 Lynn King; 1 Pepper Martin; 7 Joe Medwick; 11 Terry Moore; 30 Eddie Morgan; 31 Lou Scoffic	Manager: 3 Frankie Frisch; Coaches: 25 Mike González; 26 Buzzy Wares

== Player stats ==
=== Batting ===
==== Starters by position ====
Note: Pos = Position; G = Games played; AB = At bats; H = Hits; Avg. = Batting average; HR = Home runs; RBI = Runs batted in

Pos	Player	G	AB	H	Avg.	HR	RBI
C	Spud Davis	112	363	99	.273	4	59
1B	Johnny Mize	126	414	136	.329	19	93
2B	Stu Martin	92	332	99	.298	6	41
SS	Leo Durocher	136	510	146	.286	1	58
3B	Charlie Gelbert	93	280	64	.229	3	27
OF	Joe Medwick	155	636	223	.351	18	138
OF	Pepper Martin	143	572	177	.309	11	76
OF	Terry Moore	143	590	156	.264	5	47

==== Other batters ====
Note: G = Games played; AB = At bats; H = Hits; Avg. = Batting average; HR = Home runs; RBI = Runs batted in

Player	G	AB	H	Avg.	HR	RBI
Frankie Frisch	93	303	83	.274	1	26
Ripper Collins	103	277	81	.292	13	48
Bruce Ogrodowski	94	237	54	.228	1	20
Art Garibaldi	71	232	64	.276	1	20
Lynn King	78	100	19	.190	0	10
Don Gutteridge	23	91	29	.319	3	16
Chick Fullis	47	89	25	.281	0	6
Eddie Morgan	8	18	5	.278	1	3
Johnny Vergez	8	18	3	.167	0	1
Lou Scoffic	4	7	3	.429	0	2
Pat Ankenman	1	3	0	.000	0	0
Walter Alston	1	1	0	.000	0	0
Heinie Schuble	2	0	0	----	0	0

=== Pitching ===
==== Starting pitchers ====
Note: G = Games pitched; IP = Innings pitched; W = Wins; L = Losses; ERA = Earned run average; SO = Strikeouts

Player	G	IP	W	L	ERA	SO
Dizzy Dean	51	315.0	24	13	3.17	195
Roy Parmelee	37	221.0	11	11	4.56	79
Paul Dean	17	92.0	5	5	4.60	28
Si Johnson	12	61.2	5	3	4.38	21

==== Other pitchers ====
Note: G = Games pitched; IP = Innings pitched; W = Wins; L = Losses; ERA = Earned run average; SO = Strikeouts

Player	G	IP	W	L	ERA	SO
Jim Winford	39	192.0	11	10	3.80	72
Jesse Haines	25	99.1	7	5	3.90	19
Bill Walker	21	79.2	5	6	5.87	22
Bill Hallahan	9	37.0	2	2	6.32	16
Flint Rhem	10	26.2	2	1	6.75	7
Les Munns	7	24.0	0	3	3.00	4
Cotton Pippen	6	21.0	0	2	7.71	8
Bill McGee	7	16.0	1	1	7.88	8

==== Relief pitchers ====
Note: G = Games pitched; W = Wins; L = Losses; SV = Saves; ERA = Earned run average; SO = Strikeouts

Player	G	W	L	SV	ERA	SO
Ed Heusser	42	7	3	4	5.43	26
Mike Ryba	14	5	1	0	5.40	25
Bill Cox	2	0	0	0	6.75	1
Pepper Martin	1	0	0	0	0.00	0
Nels Potter	1	0	0	0	0.00	0

== Farm system ==
Level	Team	League	Manager
AA	Columbus Red Birds	American Association	Burt Shotton
AA	Rochester Red Wings	International League	Ray Blades
AA	Sacramento Solons	Pacific Coast League	Bill Killefer
A1	Houston Buffaloes	Texas League	Ira Smith
A	Cedar Rapids Raiders	Western League	Cap Crossley
B	Asheville Tourists	Piedmont League	Billy Southworth
B	Columbus Red Birds	Sally League	Eddie Dyer
C	Pine Bluff Judges	Cotton States League	Leroy "Cowboy" Jones
C	Jacksonville Jax	East Texas League	Roy Flaskamper and Horace Simmons
C	Huntington Red Birds	Middle Atlantic League	Benny Borgmann
C	Springfield Cardinals	Western Association	Joe Brown
D	Union City Springers	Alabama–Florida League	Hap Bohl
D	Fayetteville Bears	Arkansas–Missouri League	Fred Hawn
D	Monett Red Birds	Arkansas–Missouri League	Buzz Arlitt and Ken Blackman
D	Martinsville Manufacturers	Bi-State League	Jimmie Sanders
D	New Iberia Cardinals	Evangeline League	Vernon Taylor
D	Daytona Beach Islanders	Florida State League	Arnold Anderson
D	Albany Travelers	Georgia–Florida League	Bob Rice

Level	Team	League	Manager
D	Americus Cardinals	Georgia–Florida League	Joe Bonowitz, George Berry and Dixie Parker
D	Union City Greyhounds	KITTY League	Heinie Mueller, Bob Richards, Joe Sugden and Fred Hofmann
D	Mitchell Kernels	Nebraska State League	Bud Knox
D	Norfolk Elks	Nebraska State League	Joe McDermott
D	Newport Cardinals	Northeast Arkansas League	Thorpe Hamilton
D	Duluth Dukes	Northern League	Rip Wade
D	Jamestown Jimmies	Northern League	John Anderson, Ernie Olson and Rube Foster
D	Fostoria Cardinals	Ohio State League	Harry Aldrick and George Silvey
D	New Philadelphia Red Birds	Ohio State League	George Silvey
D	Greensburg Red Wings	Pennsylvania State Association	Clay Hopper

LEAGUE CHAMPIONS: Columbus (Sally), Union City
New Philadelphia club folded, May 25, 1936
