= Roy Parmelee =

American baseball player (1907–1981)

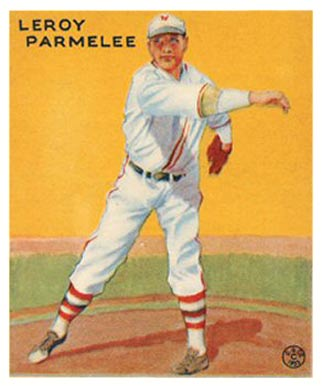
- Parmelee 1933 Goudey baseball card
- Pitcher
- Born: April 25, 1907; Lambertville, Michigan, U.S.
- Died: August 31, 1981 (aged 74); Monroe, Michigan, U.S.
- Batted: Right Threw: Right

MLB debut
- September 28, 1929, for the New York Giants

Last MLB appearance
- June 10, 1939, for the Philadelphia Athletics

MLB statistics
- Win–loss record: 59–55
- Earned run average: 4.27
- Strikeouts: 514
- Stats at Baseball Reference

Teams
- New York Giants (1929–1935); St. Louis Cardinals (1936); Chicago Cubs (1937); Philadelphia Athletics (1939)

Leroy Earl Parmelee "Tarzan" (April 25, 1907 – August 31, 1981) was an American professional baseball pitcher. He played in Major League Baseball (MLB) from 1929 to 1939 for the New York Giants, St. Louis Cardinals, Chicago Cubs, and Philadelphia Athletics.

In 1936, Parmelee posted the highest pitching game score ever in Cardinals' franchise history. On April 29, he defeated Carl Hubbell of the New York Giants in 17 innings and posted a game score of 116. Parmelee pitched all 17 innings, allowed just six hits, four walks, and one run while striking out nine. Hubbell also pitched a complete game, posting a game score of 98.

Parmelee was a better than average hitting pitcher, posting a .207 batting average (82-for-396) with 30 runs, 5 home runs and 34 RBI over 206 games pitched.

== See also ==
- List of St. Louis Cardinals team records
