= Johnny Hudson =

American baseball player (1912–1970)

- Infielder
- Born: June 30, 1912; Bryan, Texas, U.S.
- Died: November 7, 1970 (aged 58); Bryan, Texas, U.S.
- Batted: Right Threw: Right

MLB debut
- June 20, 1936, for the Brooklyn Dodgers

Last MLB appearance
- September 23, 1945, for the New York Giants

MLB statistics
- Batting average: .242
- Home runs: 4
- RBI: 96
- Stats at Baseball Reference

Teams
- Brooklyn Dodgers (1936–1940); Chicago Cubs (1941); New York Giants (1945)

John Wilson Hudson (June 30, 1912 – November 7, 1970) was an American professional baseball player, manager and scout. As an active player, the infielder appeared in 426 Major League Baseball games for the Brooklyn Dodgers, Chicago Cubs and New York Giants from 1936 to 1941 and in 1945. He threw and batted right-handed, stood 5 feet 10 inches (1.78 m) tall and weighed 160 pounds (73 kg).

In 1938, Hudson was the Dodgers' starting second baseman, penciled into the lineup for 123 games. He reached MLB career highs in hits (130) and most offensive categories. However, he led National League second basemen in errors, with 27, that year. Altogether, Hudson collected 283 big-league hits during all or parts of seven seasons, with 50 doubles, 11 triples and four home runs.

After his MLB playing career ended, he was player-manager for the Jacksonville Tars in the South Atlantic League, a Giants' farm team, from 1946 to 1948. He then scouted for the Giants in Texas and the Southwest from 1949 until his death in 1970.
