= Art Garibaldi =

American baseball player (1907–1967)

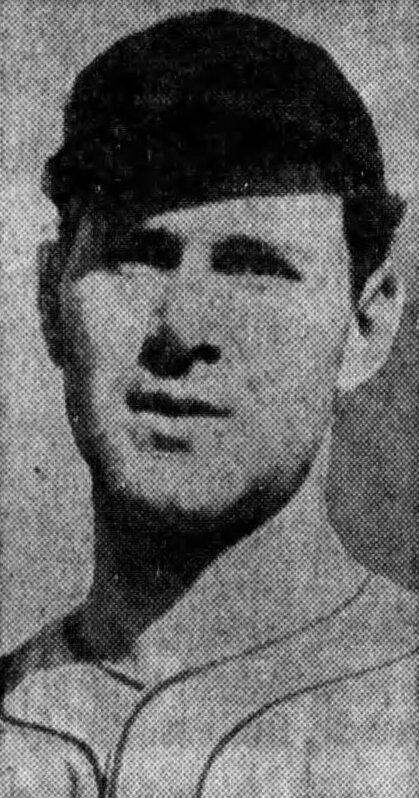
- Garibaldi with the San Francisco Seals, circa late 1930s
- Third baseman/Second baseman
- Born: August 21, 1907; San Francisco, California, U.S.
- Died: October 19, 1967 (aged 60); San Francisco, California, U.S.
- Batted: Right Threw: Right

MLB debut
- June 20, 1936, for the St. Louis Cardinals

Last MLB appearance
- September 27, 1936, for the St. Louis Cardinals

MLB statistics
- Batting average: .276
- Home runs: 1
- Runs batted in: 20
- Stats at Baseball Reference

Teams
- St. Louis Cardinals (1936)

Arthur Edward Garibaldi (August 21, 1907 – October 19, 1967) was a Major League Baseball third baseman and second baseman who played for the St. Louis Cardinals in 1936.

== Career ==
Garibaldi played for the San Francisco Seals in the PCL in the early 1930s. He was called up as an infielder with the St. Louis Cardinals in 1936. After being let go by the Cardinals that same season, Garibaldi returned to the minor leagues from 1931 until 1942. He played as a third baseman, most notably with the Sacramento Solons. He won the Pacific Coast League MVP Award when he batted .327 and drive in 106 runs in 1937.

== Death ==
On October 21, 1967, it was reported in the newspapers that Garibaldi, who was in poor physical health and in "suffering pain" according to his wife, committed suicide and died of a self-inflicted gunshot wound. He was 60 years old.
