= Jack Radtke =

American baseball player (1913–2006)

- Second baseman
- Born: April 14, 1913; Denver, Colorado, U.S.
- Died: October 24, 2006 (aged 93); Twin Falls, Idaho, U.S.
- Batted: Switch Threw: Right

MLB debut
- August 1, 1936, for the Brooklyn Dodgers

Last MLB appearance
- September 26, 1936, for the Brooklyn Dodgers

MLB statistics
- Batting average: .097
- Home runs: 0
- Runs batted in: 2
- Stats at Baseball Reference

Teams
- Brooklyn Dodgers (1936)

Jack William Radtke (April 14, 1913 – October 24, 2006) is an American former Major League Baseball player who was an infielder for the 1936 Brooklyn Dodgers.
