= Sid Gautreaux =

American baseball player

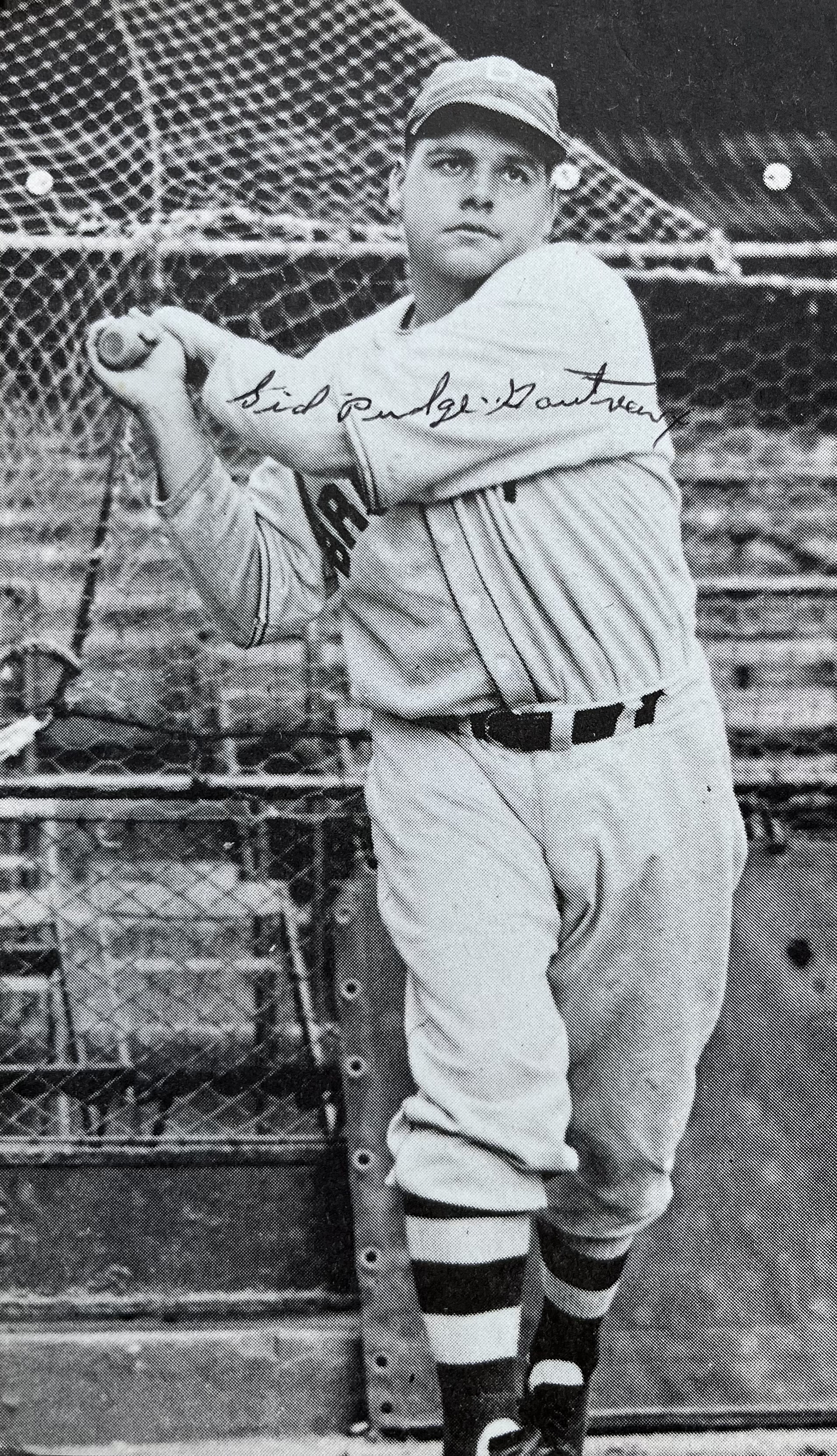
- Gautreaux played a handful of games for the Brooklyn Dodgers in the 1930s.
- Catcher
- Born: May 4, 1912; Schriever, Louisiana, U.S.
- Died: April 19, 1980 (aged 67); Morgan City, Louisiana, U.S.
- Batted: Switch Threw: Right

MLB debut
- April 15, 1936, for the Brooklyn Dodgers

Last MLB appearance
- May 20, 1937, for the Brooklyn Dodgers

MLB statistics
- Batting average: .247
- Home runs: 0
- Runs batted in: 18
- Stats at Baseball Reference

Teams
- Brooklyn Dodgers (1936–1937)

Sidney Allen Gautreaux (May 4, 1912 – April 19, 1980) was an American former professional baseball catcher in the major leagues for the Brooklyn Dodgers during the 1936 and 1937 seasons.
