= Randy Moore =

American baseball player (1906–1992)

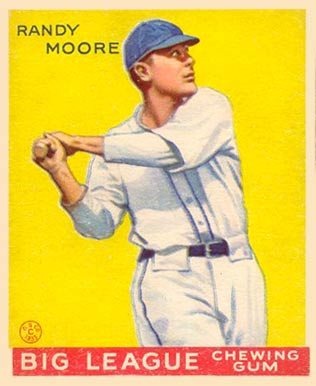
- Outfielder
- Born: June 21, 1906; Naples, Texas, U.S.
- Died: June 12, 1992 (aged 85); Mt. Pleasant, Texas, U.S.
- Batted: Left Threw: Right

MLB debut
- April 12, 1927, for the Chicago White Sox

Last MLB appearance
- September 7, 1937, for the St. Louis Cardinals

MLB statistics
- Batting average: .278
- Home runs: 27
- Runs batted in: 308
- Stats at Baseball Reference

Teams
- Chicago White Sox (1927–1928); Boston Braves (1930–1935); Brooklyn Dodgers (1936–1937); St. Louis Cardinals (1937)

Randolph Edward Moore (June 21, 1906 – June 12, 1992) was an American professional baseball outfielder. He played in Major League Baseball (MLB) for the Chicago White Sox, Boston Braves, Brooklyn Dodgers, and St. Louis Cardinals between 1927 and 1937.

He finished 23rd in voting for the 1933 National League MVP for playing in 135 Games and having 497 At Bats, 64 Runs, 150 Hits, 23 Doubles, 7 Triples, 8 Home Runs, 70 RBI, 3 Stolen Bases, 40 Walks, .302 Batting Average, .356 On-base percentage, .425 Slugging Percentage, 211 Total Bases and 9 Sacrifice Hits.

In 10 seasons he played in 749 Games and had 2,253 At Bats, 258 Runs, 627 Hits, 110 Doubles, 17 Triples, 27 Home Runs, 308 RBI, 11 Stolen Bases, 158 Walks, .278 Batting Average, .326 On-base percentage, .378 Slugging Percentage, 852 Total Bases and 30 Sacrifice hits.

He died in Mt. Pleasant, Texas at the age of 85.

== Sources ==
- Career statistics from Baseball Reference · Baseball Reference (Minors) · Retrosheet · Baseball Almanac
