= 1937 Detroit Tigers season =

Major League Baseball season

1937 Detroit Tigers
- League: American League
- Ballpark: Navin Field
- City: Detroit, Michigan
- Record: 89–65 (.578)
- League place: 2nd
- Owners: Walter Briggs, Sr.
- General managers: Mickey Cochrane
- Managers: Mickey Cochrane, Del Baker, Cy Perkins
- Radio: WWJ (AM) (Ty Tyson); WXYZ (Harry Heilmann)

The 1937 Detroit Tigers finished in second place in the American League with a record of 89–65. The team finished 13 games behind the New York Yankees. Their winning percentage of .578 ranks as the 15th best season in Detroit Tigers history.

== Regular season ==
The strength of the 1937 Tigers was hitting. The Tigers had scored 900 or more runs each season from 1934 to 1937. The 1937 total of 935 runs is the second highest in franchise history, trailing only the 1934 Tigers team that scored 958 runs. The 1937 Tigers led the major leagues with a .292 batting average—nine points higher than the Yankees. The 1937 Tigers also had power, belting twice as many home runs (150 to 74) as the 1934 team.

Second baseman Charlie Gehringer won both the American League batting title and the AL Most Valuable Player Award. First baseman Hank Greenberg led the major leagues with 183 RBIs—still the third highest single season total in major league history. Rookie catcher Rudy York did not make it into the starting lineup until early August and promptly broke the AL record with 18 home runs in the month. York finished as the AL leader in at bats per home run (10.7) and with the third highest slugging percentage (.651) in the major leagues.

While the team had the bats, it lacked the pitching to compete with the Yankees. In contrast to its league-best batting average, the Tigers pitching staff had an ERA of 4.87—ranking seventh among the eight American League teams. Elden Auker (17–9; 3.88) was the only pitcher on the staff with an ERA below 4.00. Former ace Schoolboy Rowe was suspended at the beginning of the year for poor conditioning, pitched only 31.1 innings for the year, and compiled a staggering 7.59 ERA.

The team continued to have strong support from Detroit fans, finishing the 1937 season with a team record 1,072,276 fans attending the team's home games at Briggs Stadium. The only American League team to draw more fans up to that time was the 1930 Yankees' team that drew 1,169,230.

=== The Players ===
==== Catcher: Mickey Cochrane and Rudy York ====
The 1937 season began with Mickey Cochrane as the team's player/manager. However, Cochrane's playing career came to a sudden end on May 25, 1937. After hitting a home run in the third inning, Cochrane was hit in the head by a pitch from Yankees pitcher Bump Hadley when he next came to bat. Hospitalized for seven days, the injury nearly killed him. Ordered by doctors not to play baseball again (he was just 34 years old), Cochrane returned to the dugout but never played again.

Backup catcher Ray Hayworth had his arm broken by a pitched ball shortly after Cochrane's injury, and Birdie Tebbetts took over the catching duties for most of June and July.

At the beginning of August, rookie Rudy York took over as the team's catcher and set the league on fire with his home run hitting. In August 1937, his first full month in the major leagues, York broke Babe Ruth's major league record for most home runs in a single month, hitting 18 home runs (and 44 RBIs).

For the year, York hit .307 with a .651 slugging percentage, 35 home runs, and 103 RBIs. Defensively, York was a liability at catcher, leading the AL in passed balls in 1937 despite playing only two months. In 1940, the Tigers persuaded Hank Greenberg to move to left field, allowing York to take over at first base. York was among the American League leaders in home runs for 11 consecutive seasons from 1937 to 1947, and his .503 slugging percentage as a Tiger ranks #4 in franchise history.

==== Infield: Greenberg, Gehringer, Rogell, and Owen ====
The Detroit infield remained intact for five years from 1933 through 1937: Hank Greenberg at first, Charlie Gehringer at second, Billy Rogell at shortstop, and Marv Owen at third. They were a solid group both at the bat and defensively. In 1937, Greenberg led the AL in putouts with 1477, and Gehringer, Rogell, and Owen all led the league in fielding percentage at their position.

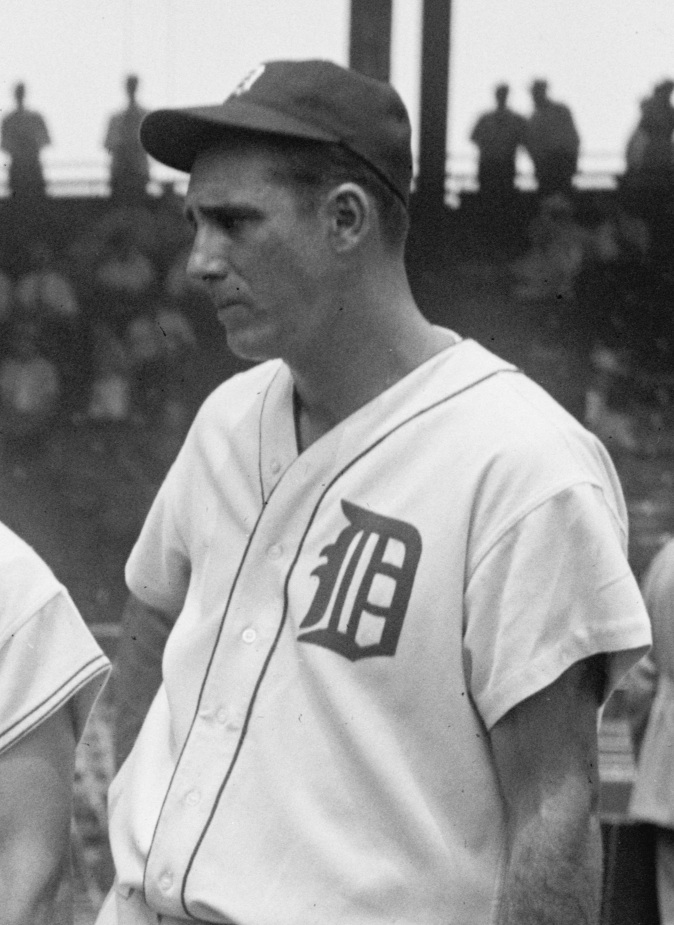
Hank Greenberg, Hall of Famer and 2-time MVP

"Hammerin' Hank" Greenberg led the major leagues with 183 RBIs in 1937—a total that still ranks as the third highest in major league history. Greenberg also led the major leagues with 103 extra base hits and 172 runs created, and was second in the major leagues with 40 home runs, a .668 slugging percentage, 102 walks, 397 total bases, and 305 times on base. He also hit for average, with a .337 batting average and .375 on-base percentage. Greenberg had already won the AL MVP award in 1935 and finished third in the 1937 voting behind Gehringer and Joe DiMaggio.

Charlie Gehringer had the best season of his career winning the American League batting title (.371) and the American League Most Valuable Player award. Gehringer also lead AL second basemen in fielding percentage and was among the major league leaders with a .473 on-base percentage (2nd in MLB), 300 times on base (3rd in MLB), 135 runs created (3rd in MLB), 133 runs (4th in MLB), and 209 hits (5th in the AL). Known for his consistency as a hitter and fielder, Gehringer was given the nickname "The Mechanical Man" by Yankee pitcher Lefty Gomez. Mickey Cochrane joked that "Charlie says 'hello' on Opening Day, 'goodbye' on closing day, and in between hits .350."

Shortstop Billy Rogell led all AL shortstops in fielding percentage each year from 1935 to 1937, and in 1937 he hit .276 and scored 85 runs. Rogell and Gehringer played over 1,000 games together as the Tigers' double play combination. Rogell's fiery demeanor was a stark contrast to the calm, quiet demeanor of Gehringer. After retiring from baseball, Rogell served on the Detroit City Council from 1942 to 1980 . He was chairman of the city planning committee that built Detroit Metropolitan Airport, and the road entering the airport from the north, Merriman Road, changes its name to William G. Rogell Drive as it enters the airport.

Marv Owen hit .288 with 22 doubles and 45 RBIs. Owen is remembered for his role in the 1934 and 1935 World Series. In Game 7 of the 1934 Series, Joe Medwick tripled in the 6th inning with the Cardinals ahead by 7 runs. He slid hard into Owen at third, knocking Owen down. The two fought, and Detroit fans pelted Medwick with fruit and garbage when he returned to left field. As the fan reaction escalated, Commissioner Landis ordered Medwick removed from the game. Owen also owns one record that still stands: 31 consecutive World Series plate appearances without a hit.

==== Outfield: Fox, White and Walker ====
In the outfield, the Tigers had Gee Walker, Pete Fox, and Jo-Jo White.

Right fielder Pete Fox was a mainstay in the Detroit outfield for eight seasons (1933–1940). He played on three AL pennant champion teams, and he was the Tigers' leading hitter in the 1935 World Series. Though a native of Indiana, Detroit became his adopted home, and he died there in 1966. In 1937, Fox hit .331 and was among the league leaders with 149 singles (3rd), 208 hits (6th), 116 runs scored (8th), and 12 stolen bases (10th).

Gee Walker played in the Tigers' outfield from 1931 to 1937. Known as "The Madman from Mississippi", Walker was a fiery competitor and a clown. In 1937, he played 151 games in the outfield, including 88 games in left, 54 in right, and 11 in center. Walker began the season on fire. On Opening Day, he hit for the cycle—the only player to accomplish that feat on Opening Day. Walker hit the cycle in reverse order—starting with a home run, followed by triple, then a double, and a single. Walker continued his hot hitting in the spring of 1937 with a 27-game hit streak in April and May 1937. Walker's fast start earned him a spot on the AL All-Star team. He finished among the AL leaders with 213 hits (3rd), 23 stolen bases (3rd), 149 singles (3rd), 42 doubles (6th), 113 RBIs (9th), and a .335 average (8th). His Power/Speed Number in 1937 was 20.2—tops in both leagues. Despite Walker's strong performance in 1937, the Tigers (reportedly unhappy with Walker's antics) traded him and Marv Owen to the Red Sox on December 2, 1937. The trade caused an uproar among Detroit fans, and owner Walter Briggs was forced to issue an announcement from his Miami home that "the deal was made with my approval."

Center fielder Jo-Jo White played in the Tigers' outfield from 1932 to 1938. He hit .313 in 1934, but his average fell off after that year. In 1937, Jo-Jo hit .246 and played only 94 games. White's real first name was Joyner, but he was called "Jo-Jo" because of the way he pronounced his native state of Georgia.

Rookie Chet Laabs also played 62 games in the outfield for the 1937 Tigers. Labs hit .240 with a .434 slugging percentage. In 1938, Laabs struck out five times in one game against Bob Feller, helping Feller set the all-time record with 18 strikeouts in a nine-inning game. Laabs later hit 27 home runs with 99 RBIs for the 1943 St. Louis Browns.

Hall of Famer Goose Goslin also played in 39 games, but his batting average fell to .238 with 43 hits and 35 RBIs. The Tigers released Goslin on October 3, 1937, and Goslin later recounted (in "The Glory of Their Times") that he received a call from his old boss, Clark Griffith, asking him if he'd be interested in ending his career back where it began in Washington. Goslin jumped at the opportunity and batted .158 in 38 games for the Senators in the 1938 season. The Senators played in only three World Series in their history (1924, 1925, and 1933), and Goslin played for the Senators in every game of those Series.

==== Pitching: Auker, Bridges, Lawson, Wade, Gill and Poffenberger ====
Elden Auker was the team's best pitcher in 1937. An underhand pitcher out of Kansas A&M, Auker had a record of 17–9 with 19 complete games and an ERA of 3.88 (Adjusted ERA+ of 120). During the 1935 World Series, Auker was interviewed by a young Cubs broadcaster, Ronald Reagan. When they met after Reagan had been elected Governor of California, Reagan told him, "You probably won't remember me, but I'll remember you as long as I live." The 1935 radio interview, Reagan said, "was my first big break."

After three consecutive 20+ win seasons, Tommy Bridges dropped to a 15–12 season with a 4.07 ERA. He continued, however, to be among the league leaders with 138 strikeouts (5th in the AL). Bridges played in four World Series and six All-Star Games with the Tigers. One of the hardest throwers of the 1930s, Bridges was among the AL leaders in strikeouts 12 times and led the league in strikeouts in 1935 and 1936.

Roxie Lawson had his best season was 1937, with a record of 18–7, despite a 5.26 ERA in 217.1 innings. His 18 wins was 3rd best in the AL, and his winning percentage of .720 was 6th best. Lawson also threw 15 complete games (10th best in the AL) and had a .259 batting average with six RBIs. His performance garnered him enough votes to finish 19th in the 1937 AL MVP voting.

Rookie Boots Poffenberger was called up to the Tigers mid-season and went 10–5. His won-loss percentage of .667 in 1937 was seventh best in the AL. Boots was only 21 years old when he debuted with the Tigers, and his career spun out of control within two years. Stories about Poffenberger's late night drinking and poor training practices caused him to fall out of favor with the team. After a night of heavy drinking while on the road in 1937, Poffenberger called room service and said, "I'll have the breakfast of champions." When asked if he wanted cereal, Poffenberge replied, "Hell, no. Two fried eggs and a bottle of beer." '

George Gill made his debut with the Tigers at age 28 on May 4, 1937. On May 30, 1937, led by fellow Mississippian Gee Walker‚ the Tigers collected 20 hits in an 18–3 victory for Gill. In his rookie season, Gill went 11–4 in 31 games (10 as a starter). His 1937 record ranked 5th in the AL in winning percentage (.733). He was also 7th in the league in games finished with 18.

Pitcher "Whistling Jake" Wade also had his most productive season in 1937, posting career highs in wins (7), starts (25), complete games (7), strikeouts (69) and innings pitched (165-1/3). Wade pitched a one-hit shutout in the last game of the 1937 regular season, preventing Cleveland pitcher Johnny Allen from tying the AL record of 16 straight wins. However, Wade struggled with control and was among the AL leaders in 1937 with 107 walks allowed (7th) and five wild pitches (8th). Wade was nicknamed "Whistling Jake" not for his fastball but because of his tendency to whistle whenever he was nervous.

=== Season standings ===
American League
Team	W	L	Pct.	GB	Home	Road
New York Yankees	102	52	.662	—	57‍–‍20	45‍–‍32
Detroit Tigers	89	65	.578	13	49‍–‍28	40‍–‍37
Chicago White Sox	86	68	.558	16	47‍–‍30	39‍–‍38
Cleveland Indians	83	71	.539	19	50‍–‍28	33‍–‍43
Boston Red Sox	80	72	.526	21	44‍–‍29	36‍–‍43
Washington Senators	73	80	.477	28½	43‍–‍35	30‍–‍45
Philadelphia Athletics	54	97	.358	46½	27‍–‍50	27‍–‍47
St. Louis Browns	46	108	.299	56	25‍–‍51	21‍–‍57

=== Record vs. opponents ===
1937 American League record Sources:
Team	BOS	CWS	CLE	DET	NYY	PHA	SLB	WSH
Boston	—	10–12	11–11	12–10–1	7–15	17–3	15–7	8–14–1
Chicago	12–10	—	10–12	8–14	9–13	15–7	18–4	14–8
Cleveland	11–11	12–10	—	11–11	7–15–1	13–9	18–4–1	11–11
Detroit	10–12–1	14–8	11–11	—	9–13	14–8	15–7	16–6
New York	15–7	13–9	15–7–1	13–9	—	14–8	16–6–1	16–6–1
Philadelphia	3–17	7–15	9–13	8–14	8–14	—	11–11	8–13–3
St. Louis	7–15	4–18	4–18–1	7–15	6–16–1	11–11	—	7–15
Washington	14–8–1	8–14	11–11	6–16	6–16–1	13–8–3	15–7	—

=== Season chronology ===
- April 4: The Tigers sold future Hall of Fame left fielder Al Simmons to the Washington Senators for $15,000. After hitting .327 with 112 RBIs for the 1936 Tigers, Simmons hit .279 with 84 RBIs for the 1937 Senators.
- April 19: The Tigers purchased Babe Herman from the Cincinnati Reds. Herman was released two months later on June 15. Herman had six hits in 20 at bats for the Tigers.
- April 20: Elden Auker and the Tigers beat the Indians, 4–3, on Opening Day in Detroit. Gee Walker hit for the cycle, becoming the only batter to hit for the cycle on Opening Day. Walker achieved the cycle starting with a home run, followed by a triple‚ double‚ and single. Detroit won the opener, 4–3, over the Indians.
- April 23: The Tigers beat the White Sox, 10–2, as Roxie Lawson won his first start.
- May 3: The Tigers completed a three-game sweep of the White Sox, 12–9, as Clyde Hatter got the win in relief. The Tigers were 7–2 after nine games.
- May 7: The Tigers beat the Senators, 4–2, as Roxie Lawson got his fourth win in four starts.
- May 8: The Tigers lost to the Washington Senators, 8–3. Bobo Newsom got the win over Schoolboy Rowe. Newsom hit the only home run of his career in the game.
- May 11: The Tigers were swept by the Senators, having lost six of their last eight games. After starting 7–2 they were 9–8.
- May 13: After making his major league debut on May 4, Detroit pitcher George Gill got his first start and shut out the Red Sox‚ 4–0. Gill allowed only five hits‚ three by Joe Cronin. AL MVP Charlie Gehringer had a double and a home run in the game.
- May 16: The Tigers beat the St. Louis Browns, 5–4, as Gee Walker extended his hit streak to 21 games.
- May 22: Hank Greenberg hit a home run out of Fenway Park. The blast was called the longest home run ever hit at Fenway Park, passing to the right of the flag pole on its way out of the stadium. Gee Walker added three hits to extend his hit streak to 26 games. The Red Sox won anyway, 11–9.
- May 24: The Tigers beat the Senators, 3–1, and Roxie Lawson logged his seventh win just one month into the season. Gee Walker failed to get a hit, and his hit streak came to an end at 27 games.
- May 25: This was the day that Mickey Cochrane's playing career came to an end. Cochrane hit a home run off Yankees pitcher, Bump Hadley, in the third inning. When he came to bat in the fifth inning, Hadley's pitch hit Cochrane in the head. Cochrane's skull was fractured in three places. Cochrane never played another game. Del Baker took over as manager while Cochrane was hospitalized. The Yankees won the game‚ 4–3. Schoolboy Rowe was the losing pitcher.
- May 30: The Tigers beat the St. Louis Browns, 18–3. Rookie George Gill got the win, and Hank Greenberg was 5-for-5 with two home runs. Gee Walker also hit two home runs and seven RBIs.
- June 5: The Yankees beat the Tigers, 6–5, as Lou Gehrig hit two home runs. Gee Walker had three hits in the game but was failed to hit in the ninth inning with the winning run on second base.
- June 8: Elden Auker shut out the A's, 6–0. The win was Auker's only shutout in 1937 and his third win in seven starts.
- June 9: After his May 25 beaning, the Tigers removed Mickey Cochrane from the active roster. Rookie catcher Rudy York was called up from Toledo.
- June 12: The Tigers split a doubleheader with the Red Sox. After losing their starting catcher to a beaning incident on May 25, Detroit's #2 catcher Ray Hayworth was hit by a Bobo Newsom pitch and fractured his arm. Birdie Tebbetts took over as catcher, but would soon give way to rookie Rudy York.
- July 5: The Tigers swept the White Sox in a doubleheader in Chicago. In the first game, rookie Boots Poffenberger got his third win and his first as a starter. The Tigers scored eight in support of Poffenberger, and beat the Sox, 8–4.
- July 7: The AL beat the NL in the All-Star Game, 8–3. Charlie Gehringer went 3-for-5 with an RBI and a run. Tommy Bridges pitched three innings and gave up all three NL runs. Gee Walker was selected as a starter but did not play. Despite having 103 RBIs at the All-Star break (still a major league record for RBIs at the All-Star break), Hank Greenberg also did not play, as Lou Gehrig played the entire game.
- July 10: The Tigers and Indians split a doubleheader. The two teams combined for 25 extra base hits. Schoolboy Rowe got his first win of the year in the opener, pitching in relief in Detroit's 12–11 win.
- July 11: In a matchup of rookie pitching sensations, Detroit's Boots Poffenberger won his fourth game, beating Cleveland's Bob Feller, 3–2. Feller gave up only two hits, but he also gave up six walks and a wild pitch. Poffenberger gave up home runs to Hal Trosky and Moose Solters.
- July 11, 1937: Ralph Birkofer was traded by the Brooklyn Dodgers to the Tigers for Lindsay Brown and cash.
- July 16: Rookie phenom Boots Poffenberger won his fifth game, a 14–7 victory over the Yankees. The Tigers scored seven runs in the sixth inning on only one hit, as the Yankees committed two errors and walked six Detroit batters in the inning.
- July 17: Tommy Bridges pitched his second shutout of the year, beating the Senators, 6–0.
- July 26: Two months after having his skull fractured, Mickey Cochrane returned to the dugout as the team's manager, but he did not return as a player.
- August 4: After six straight losses‚ Mickey Cochrane put rookie Rudy York into the starting lineup. The Tigers beat the A's, 11–8, as York hit a three-run home run.
- August 8: Boots Poffenberger won his seventh game, 5–1, over the Senators.
- August 14: The Tigers bats exploded for an AL record 36 runs in a double header sweep over the Browns. Elden Auker held the Browns to four hits in the first game and added two home runs and five RBIs in a 16–1 decision. Boots Poffenberger got the win in the second game, 20–7. Pete Fox scored seven runs in the double header, and the Tigers scored in every inning of each game except the 8th. Charlie Gehringer added two home runs and five hits in the second game. The Tigers moved into second place‚ ten games behind the Yankees.
- August 17: The Tigers beat the White Sox‚ 11–7. Rudy York narrowly missed hitting for the cycle, with a home run, a triple, and two singles.
- August 19: The Tigers beat the White Sox, 12–4, as Tommy Bridges got the win. Rudy York hit two home runs, including a grand slam. Gee Walker also hit two home runs for Detroit.
- August 20: Mickey Cochrane, still suffering from the effects of his fractured skull, did not travel with the team to St. Louis. The Tigers won three of the four games against the Browns despite Cochrane's absence.
- August 22: The Tigers swept the Browns in a double header, as Rudy York hit his ninth and tenth home runs of the month.
- August 24: Rudy York hit three home runs in a double header against the A's. The Tigers won the first game‚ 6–3‚ but lost the second‚ 9–8.
- August 25: Roxie Lawson won his 16th game for the Tigers, a 10–4 win over the A's. Lawson drove in the winning run with a bunt single in the ninth inning. Third baseman Marv Owen tied a major league record with nine assists in the game.
- August 27: The Tigers lost to the Red Sox, 8–5, but Rudy York hit his seventh home run in seven games. Gee Walker added a home run.
- August 30: The Tigers beat the Yankees, 5–4, as Rudy York hit his 16th home run of the month. Hank Greenberg added a home run, and Elden Auker got the win.
- August 31: Rudy York hit two home runs to break Babe Ruth's major league record for most home runs in a month. York finished the month of August with 18 home runs. York had seven RBIs in the game and 44 for the month. Roxie Lawson got the win, as Detroit beat the Senators, 12–3.
- September 3: The Tigers beat the White Sox, 4–3. Elden Auker got the win, Charlie Gehringer went 3-for-3, and the defense contributed 21 assists.
- September 6: The Tigers swept the Browns in a doubleheader, 10–9 and 5–2. Rookie Boots Poffenberger held the Browns to two runs for his tenth win.
- September 12: The Tigers swept the White Sox in a three-game series. Tommy Bridges shut out the Sox in the final game, 4–0. Detroit pitchers had only six shutouts in 1937, three of them by Bridges, and one each by George Gill, Elden Auker, and Jake Wade.
- September 19: Elden Auker and the Tigers beat the Yankees, 8–1, to keep their pennant hopes alive. Hank Greenberg hit a home run into the center field stands at Yankee Stadium, becoming the first player ever to do so. Auker had 3 RBIs and won his third straight game over the Yankees.
- September 23: The Yankees clinched the AL pennant as the Tigers lost to the Red Sox, 4–3.
- October 2: Rudy York hit his 35th home run‚ tying the AL record for rookies. York collected 103 RBIs for the year, in 375 at-bats. York's performance was the major league record for fewest at bats with 100 RBIs until the record was surpassed by Barry Bonds in 2004 (101 RBIs in 373 at-bats).
- October 3: Detroit pitcher Jake Wade beat the Indians, 1–0, in the last game of the regular season. Johnny Allen, pitching for Cleveland on two days' rest, had a chance to tie the AL record of 16 straight wins. Allen gave up only one hit, but the Tigers scored in the first inning when Cleveland third baseman Sammy Hale missed a ground ball, allowing Pete Fox to score the game's only run. Hank Greenberg was credited with a hit and collected his 183rd RBI.
- October 16: Five months after playing his last major league game for the Tigers on May 10, pitcher Clyde Hatter died in Yosemite, Kentucky at age 29. While officially listed as a heart attack, teammate Marv Owen recalled that Hatter had a serious drinking problem and was sent to the minor leagues during the regular season. Owen reported Hatter's death this way: "He went home that winter and they found him dead in the back of his father's car. From booze."
- November 2: Charlie Gehringer was named the AL MVP receiving 78 out of a possible 80 points. Joe DiMaggio finished second, and Hank Greenberg was third. Gehringer was the third Tiger to win the award in four years. Mickey Cochrane won it in 1934 and Hank Greenberg in 1935.

=== Roster ===
1937 Detroit Tigers
Roster
Pitchers: 12 Elden Auker; 10 Tommy Bridges; 21 Slick Coffman; 16 George Gill; 21 Clyde Hatter; 15 Roxie Lawson; 17 Bob Logan; 17,22 Pat McLaughlin; 24 Boots Poffenberger; 14 Schoolboy Rowe; 26 Jack Russell; 18 Vic Sorrell; 29 Jake Wade	Catchers: 18 Cliff Bolton; 3 Mickey Cochrane; 23 Ray Hayworth; 28 Birdie Tebbetts; 20 Rudy York; Infielders: -- Flea Clifton; 24 Gil English; 2 Charlie Gehringer; 30 Charlie Gelbert; 5 Hank Greenberg; 8 Marv Owen; 7 Billy Rogell	Outfielders: 9 Pete Fox; 4 Goose Goslin; 27 Babe Herman; 6 Chet Laabs; 11 Gee Walker; 25 Jo-Jo White	Manager: 3 Mickey Cochrane; Coaches: 32 Del Baker; 31 Cy Perkins

== Player stats ==
=== Batting ===
==== Starters by position ====
Note: Pos = Position; G = Games played; AB = At bats; H = Hits; Avg. = Batting average; HR = Home runs; RBI = Runs batted in

Pos	Player	G	AB	H	Avg.	HR	RBI
C	Rudy York	104	375	115	.307	35	103
1B	Hank Greenberg	154	594	200	.337	40	183
2B	Charlie Gehringer	144	564	209	.371	14	96
3B	Marv Owen	107	396	114	.288	1	45
SS	Billy Rogell	146	536	148	.276	8	64
OF	Gee Walker	151	635	213	.335	18	113
OF	Pete Fox	148	628	208	.331	12	82
OF	Jo-Jo White	94	305	75	.246	0	21

==== Other batters ====
Note: G = Games played; AB = At bats; H = Hits; Avg. = Batting average; HR = Home runs; RBI = Runs batted in

Player	G	AB	H	Avg.	HR	RBI
Chet Laabs	72	242	58	.240	8	37
Goose Goslin	79	181	43	.238	4	35
Birdie Tebbetts	50	162	31	.191	2	16
Mickey Cochrane	27	98	30	.306	2	12
Ray Hayworth	30	78	21	.269	1	8
Gil English	18	65	17	.262	1	6
Cliff Bolton	27	57	15	.263	1	7
Charlie Gelbert	20	47	4	.085	0	1
Flea Clifton	15	43	5	.116	0	2
Babe Herman	17	20	6	.300	0	3

Note: pitchers' batting statistics not included

=== Pitching ===
==== Starting pitchers ====
Note: G = Games pitched; IP = Innings pitched; W = Wins; L = Losses; ERA = Earned run average; SO = Strikeouts

Player	G	IP	W	L	ERA	SO
Elden Auker	39	252.2	17	9	3.88	73
Tommy Bridges	34	245.1	15	12	4.07	138
Roxie Lawson	37	217.1	18	7	5.26	68
Jake Wade	33	165.1	7	10	5.39	69

==== Other pitchers ====
Note: G = Games pitched; IP = Innings pitched; W = Wins; L = Losses; ERA = Earned run average; SO = Strikeouts

Player	G	IP	W	L	ERA	SO
Boots Poffenberger	29	137.1	10	5	4.65	35
George Gill	31	127.2	11	4	4.51	40
Slick Coffman	28	101.0	7	5	4.37	22
Pat McLaughlin	10	32.2	0	2	6.34	8
Schoolboy Rowe	10	31.1	1	4	8.62	6
Vic Sorrell	7	17.0	0	2	9.00	11

==== Relief pitchers ====
Note: G = Games pitched; W = Wins; L = Losses; SV = Saves; GF = Games finished; ERA = Earned run average; SO = Strikeouts

Player	G	W	L	SV	GF	ERA	SO
Jack Russell	25	2	5	4	16	7.59	10
Clyde Hatter	3	1	0	0	0	11.57	4
Bob Logan	1	0	0	0	0	0.00	0

== Awards and honors ==
- Charlie Gehringer, AL Most Valuable Player Award

1937 Major League Baseball All-Star Game

- Charlie Gehringer, 2B, Starter
- Gee Walker, OF, Starter
- Hank Greenberg, 1B
- Tommy Bridges, P

=== Major league records ===
Rudy York

- Set MLB record for most home runs in a single month (18 in August)

=== League top ten finishers ===
Elden Auker

- #4 in AL in wins (17)
- #2 in AL in hit batsmen (6)
- #6 in AL in complete games (19)

Tommy Bridges

- #5 in AL in strikeouts (138)
- #5 in AL in strikeouts per 9 innings (5.06)
- #5 in AL in strikeout to walk ratio (1.52)

Pete Fox

- #3 in AL in singles (149)
- #8 in AL in runs (116)

Charlie Gehringer

- AL batting champion (.371)
- AL leader in fielding percentage by a second baseman (.986)
- #2 in MLB in on-base percentage (.473)
- #2 in AL in singles (154)
- #3 in MLB in times on base (300)
- #4 in MLB in runs created (135)
- #5 in MLB in runs (133)
- #5 in AL in hits (209)

George Gill: #5 in AL in win percentage (.733)

Hank Greenberg

- MLB leader in RBIs (183)
- MLB leader in extra base hits (103)
- MLB leader in runs created (172)
- AL leader in putouts (1477)
- #2 in MLB in home runs (40)
- #2 in MLB in slugging percentage (.668)
- #2 in MLB in walks (102)
- #2 in AL in doubles (49)
- #2 in MLB in OPS (1.105)
- #2 in AL in total bases (397)
- #2 in MLB in times on base (305)
- #2 in AL in strikeouts (101)
- #4 in MLB in runs (137)
- #3 in AL in on-base percentage (.436)
- #3 in AL in at bats per home run (15.4)
- #5 in AL in triples (14)
- #3 in AL in wins (18)
- #4 in AL in earned runs allowed (127)

Roxie Lawson

- #4 in AL in wild pitches (6)(127)
- #6 in AL in win percentage (.720)
- #6 in MLB in bases on balls allowed (115)

Marv Owen: AL leader in fielding percentage by a third baseman (.970)

Billy Rogell: AL leader in fielding percentage by a shortstop (.967)

"Whistling Jake" Wade: #8 in MLB in bases on balls allowed (107)

Gee Walker

- MLB leader in power/speed number (20.2)
- #3 in AL in hits (213)
- #3 in AL in stolen bases (23)
- #3 in AL in singles (149)

Rudy York

- AL leader in at bats per home run (10.7)
- AL leader in passed balls (12)
- #3 in MLB in slugging percentage (.651)
- #4 in AL in OPS (1.026)
- #5 in AL in home runs (35)

=== Players ranking among top 100 all time at position ===
The following members of the 1937 Detroit Tigers are among the Top 100 of all time at their position, as ranked by The New Bill James Historical Baseball Abstract in 2001:

- Mickey Cochrane: 4th best catcher of all time
- Birdie Tebbetts: 64th best catcher of all time
- Rudy York: 56th best first baseman of all time
- Hank Greenberg: 8th best first baseman of all time
- Charlie Gehringer: 8th best second baseman of all time
- Billy Rogell: 49th best shortstop of all time
- Goose Goslin: 16th best left fielder of all time
- Gee Walker: 92nd best left fielder of all time
- Pete Fox: 96th best right fielder of all time
- Tommy Bridges: 77th best pitcher of all time

== Farm system ==
Level	Team	League	Manager
A1	Beaumont Exporters	Texas League	Al Vincent
A	Sioux City Cowboys	Western League	Dutch Lorbeer and Pete Monahan
C	Marshall Tigers	East Texas League	Bama Jones and Jimmy Dalrymple
C	Charleston Senators	Middle Atlantic League	Ig Walters
D	Lake Charles Skippers	Evangeline League	Joe Bratcher
D	Beckley Bengals	Mountain State League	Eli Harris
D	Tiffin Mud Hens	Ohio State League	Emilio Palmero and Charlie Eckert

LEAGUE CHAMPIONS: Beckley
