= Flea Clifton =

American baseball player (1908–1997)

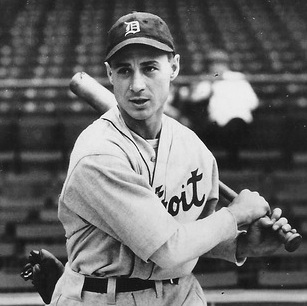
- Clifton with the Detroit Tigers
- Infielder
- Born: December 12, 1908; Cincinnati, Ohio, US
- Died: December 22, 1997 (aged 89); Cincinnati, Ohio, US
- Batted: Right Threw: Right

MLB debut
- April 29, 1934, for the Detroit Tigers

Last MLB appearance
- July 1, 1937, for the Detroit Tigers

MLB statistics
- Batting average: .200
- Hits: 39
- Runs batted in: 13

Teams
- Detroit Tigers (1934–1937)

Career highlights and awards
- World Series champion (1935)

Herman Earl "Flea" Clifton (December 12, 1908 – December 22, 1997), was a professional baseball player for 13 years from 1930 to 1943. He played parts of four season in Major League Baseball as an infielder for the Detroit Tigers from 1934 to 1937. He was a member of the 1935 Detroit Tigers team and was the starting third baseman in the 1935 World Series.

Clifton also played 12 years of minor league baseball, including stints with Raleigh Capitals (1930–1931), Beaumont Exporters (1932–1933), Toledo Mud Hens (1936–1937), Toronto Maple Leafs (1938–1941), Oklahoma City Indians (1941–1942), Fort Worth Cats (1942), and Minneapolis Millers (1943). After retiring from baseball in 1944, Clifton worked in the insurance business in Cincinnati, Ohio, for 40 years.

== Early years ==
Clifton was born in Cincinnati, Ohio, in 1908. He grew up in the west end of Cincinnati.

His father was killed in the Argonne Forest in 1918 while serving in World War I. In 1925, his mother was strangled, using Clifton's school tie, by a friend of his stepfather. Clifton became a homeless orphan at age 15: "Right after my mom died my stepdad kicked my ass out into the snow. He never liked me, anyway. Rightfully so. That was 1925. I'll never forget that year. For a year it was tough, but I toughened up pretty quick. I was living behind a garage in the back end of town, across the Ohio River in Ludlow, Kentucky." Eventually, his grandmother found him and "dragged" him to her house where he lived.

== Professional baseball career ==
=== Minor leagues ===
Clifton played semi-pro baseball in Cincinnati on a team that won the city championship. The team advanced to the National Amateur Baseball Federation tournament, and Clifton was voted the outstanding shortstop in the tournament. He was discovered by Detroit scout Billy Doyle and signed with the Detroit Tigers. Clifton idolized Ty Cobb as a boy (Clifton referred to Cobb as his "patron saint") and signed with Detroit even though the St. Louis Cardinals were willing to pay more money.

==== Raleigh ====
Clifton began his professional baseball career playing in the Detroit farm system for the Raleigh Capitals of the Class C Piedmont League. He played for Raleigh in 1930 and 1931. In 1930, he hit .261 with nine triples and two home runs. In 1931, he improved his batting average to .301.

Clifton met future Hall of Famer Hank Greenberg when they played together in Raleigh. Greenberg and Clifton were the only two teammates from Raleigh to make it to the major leagues with the Tigers. The two remained friends and teammates through the remainder of Clifton's career. Clifton appeared in the 1998 documentary about Greenberg, "The Life and Times of Hank Greenberg."

In his autobiography, Greenberg recalled Clifton as a "tough little guy even though he weighed only about 150 pounds." Greenberg wrote that, while playing together in Raleigh, Clifton used a gray bat made of Cuban wood that he soaked in water every night, supposedly "to keep it from cracking or chipping." Greenberg recalled: "Flea guarded that bat with his life; he'd fight anybody who came near it." Greenberg also joked about Clifton's unusual diet: "On the road, he used to eat nothing but dougnuts and bananas. He said they were cheap and filling and stretched his meal money. Flea was the only ballplayer who could show a profit on $1-a-day meal money."

==== Beaumont ====
In 1932 and 1933, Clifton played for the Beaumont Exporters in the Class A Texas League. The 1932 Beaumont team, managed by Del Baker, won the Texas League championship and included several future Tigers, including Clifton, Hank Greenberg, Schoolboy Rowe, Pete Fox, Elden Auker and Frank Reiber. Each of these players would play together on Detroit's 1934 and 1935 Detroit pennant teams.

Clifton later recalled that he frequently got into "fracases" with other players and ended up being hit by pitches more than anyone else. When Clifton claimed not to understand why he got hit so much, a teammate told him: "Then repeat after me: 'I give the pitcher hell, I give the catcher hell, I give the infielders hell, so their control's not so good when you come to the plate.'"

While playing in Beaumont, manager Del Baker gave him the nickname "Flea." Clifton's son recounted: "He kept pestering the manager until the guy said, 'Herman, you're worse than a damn sand flea,' and the 'flea' stuck."

Clifton enjoyed the wild atmosphere in the Texas League. He later wrote: "Texas is my favorite state, for a number of reasons. The beer tastes better and the women are prettier. And I love the heat. . . . Texas would've adopted me, I'm telling you right now. I would've been a good ol' Texan. Fact of the matter is, the owner of the Beaumont team wanted to adopt me."

In 1933, Clifton had his best season in professional baseball. He raised his batting average to .301 with 25 doubles, 11 triples, 49 stolen bases, and two home runs in 575 at bats. He also drew 93 walks boosting his on-base percentage to .393. The Detroit Free Press praised Clifton's patience at the plate: "He has a good eye and knows how to wait a pitcher out." Defensively, Clifton became one of the best shortstops in the Texas League, compiling 417 putouts, 433 assists and a .966 fielding percentage.

=== Detroit Tigers ===
==== 1934 season ====
After a strong season in Beaumont, Clifton was the subject of a front-page profile in The Sporting News in December 1933. The article noted that he had been Beaumont's starting second baseman in 1933 and a shortstop in 1932. It concluded that Clifton was "not expected to cause the retirement of Charlie Gehringer to the shade of the bench, but there is a strong possibility that he will stay around because of his qualifications as a utility man."

Clifton attended spring training with the Tigers in 1934 as the No. 1 rookie in the camp. With Gehringer entrenched at second base, the Tigers sought to convert Clifton to third base as a possible replacement for Marv Owen. Team owner Frank Navin, not typically verbose in his praise for rookies, stated that he appreciated Clifton's effort and viewed him as an "old-fashioned player."

Clifton made the Tigers' roster in 1934, but was unable to find a spot in the starting lineup. With Charlie Gehringer, Billy Rogell and Marv Owen appearing in all 154 games at second, short and third, there was little room for Clifton even to make an appearance as a backup. He appeared in only 20 games for the 1934 Tigers, none as a starter, and went 1-for-16 for an .063 batting average. His most memorable moment on September 16 in the middle of the Tigers' pennant drive. Clifton was placed into a game as a pinch runner for Ray Hayworth. With one out, Jo Jo White hit a slow ground ball to the second baseman; Clifton began running with the crack of the bat and when the second baseman threw to first, Clifton rounded third and scored the winning run. Playing on Clifton's small size, the Detroit press dubbed the play the "hidden runner" trick.

The Tigers won the 1934 American League pennant, but Clifton saw no action in the 1934 World Series.

==== 1935 season ====
In January 1935, Clifton heard that the Tigers were considering sending him to the Hollywood Stars of the Pacific Coast League. He drove through a snowstorm from his home in Cincinnati to Detroit to make a personal plead to club owner Frank Navin: "Don't send me away from the Tigers without another chance. . . . Give me a chance to fight for my job." Navin was impressed and withdrew the plan to send Clifton to Hollywood.

With the Tigers' veteran infield returning, the 1935 season began for Clifton much like the 1934 season. Gehringer and Rogell appeared in 150 games, but Owen missed 19 games at third. Clifton filled in for Owen, starting 19 games at third base and also starting four games at second and two at shortstop. Clifton appeared in a total of 45 games for the 1935 Tigers and improved his batting average to .255 with nine RBIs.

In the 1935 World Series, Clifton started the series on the bench. However, Hank Greenberg broke his wrist in Game 2, and Marv Owen was moved from third base to first base to fill in for Greenberg. With Owen vacating third, Clifton stepped in as the starting third baseman for the remainder of the Series. Clifton was hitless in 16 at bats in the Series, and later recalled: "I never hit the ball harder than I did in the '35 Series, but I couldn't buy a base hit."

Though he was unable to hit, Clifton walked twice, scored a key run and contributed defensively to the 1935 World Series championship. In Game 4, Clifton scored the winning run to put the Tigers ahead, 3 games to 1. With two out in the sixth inning, Clifton hit a long, high line fly to deep left field. Chicago's Augie Galan misplayed the ball, and Clifton wound up on second base. Pitcher Alvin Crowder then came to bat and hit an "easy roller" through the infield, and Clifton scored standing up from second base.

Clifton also made a significant contribution to the Tigers' decisive Game 6 victory. With the Cubs ahead, 3–2, Stan Hack hit a double in the 6th inning. When Hack tried to score from second base later in the inning, Clifton positioned himself in the base path as Hack attempted to round third base. Hack was called out when he tried to run around Clifton. Hack protested that he had not left the base path, but the call was upheld. The Tigers scored twice after Hack was called out and won the game, 4–3.

==== 1936 and 1937 seasons ====
Clifton saw limited action with the Tigers in 1936 and 1937. In 1936, he appeared in only 13 games for the Tigers and compiled a .192 batting average. He spent some of the season with the Tigers' farm team, appearing in 19 games for the Toledo Mud Hens.

In 1937, Clifton was left with the Mud Hens for most of the season. He appeared in 107 games in Toledo and compiled a .253 batting average with 18 doubles, three triples, and four home runs. When Charlie Gehringer pulled a ligament during the 1937 season, Clifton was recalled to the Tigers to play second base. He appeared in 15 games for the 1937 Tigers, managing only five hits in 43 at bats for a .114 batting average. Clifton appeared in his last major league game on July 1, 1937. With Gehringer healthy, the Tigers sent Clifton back to Toledo subject to recall on 24-hour notice.

In January 1938, the Tigers gave Clifton an outright release, selling him to the Toronto Maple Leafs. Veteran Detroit sports writer Sam Greene paid tribute to Clifton upon his final, unconditional release by the Tigers. Greene wrote:

"The definite departure of the versatile Clifton will be accepted with a measure of regret by those who appreciate hustling abilities in an athlete. Clifton has no superior in aggressive spirit. To him a ball game, regardless of the state of the score, was always worthy of his best efforts."

Greene concluded that, despite Clifton's zest for the game, he could not overcome the simple physical reality that he was too "undersized and frail" to compete in the major leagues.

=== Return to the minors ===
After leaving the Tigers, Clifton played eight more years in the minor leagues. He played for the Toronto Maple Leafs in the International League from 1938 to 1941, the Oklahoma City Indians in the Texas League from 1941 to 1942, and the Fort Worth Cats in the Texas League in 1942.

Clifton concluded his professional baseball career in 1943, playing 150 games for the Minneapolis Millers in the American Association. Clifton compiled a .282 batting average and 56 RBIs for the 1943 Millers. Clifton retired from baseball when an offer to make him manager in Minneapolis was revoked: "I had a really good year. They were going to make me manager, but then they gave it to Zeke Bonura, who was coming out of the service. I said the hell with it. I had three kids and I didn't like to travel. I started in the insurance business, another career."

== Family and later years ==
Clifton was married to his wife, Marcella, in 1931. Their children included son, Kerry, and daughters, Arlene, Carol and Gwenn.

After retiring from baseball in 1944, Clifton returned to his hometown of Cincinnati. He became an insurance agent and worked for 40 years at the George R. Hammerlein Insurance agency, eventually holding the title of vice president. Clifton also served for many years as a sandlot baseball coach in the Greater Cincinnati Knothole Association, where his Bridgetown and Harrison teams "won several city and national championships." His son, Kerry Clifton, recalled his father's days as a coach: "When you played for him, he'd tell you he'd promise you three things: a little sweat, a little blood and victory ... He'd take everybody's castoffs and mold them into championship teams."

In December 1997, Clifton died of complications from a stroke at Franciscan Hospital-Western Hills Hospital in Cincinnati.

== See also ==
- 1935 Detroit Tigers season
