= Pete Fox =

American baseball player (1909–1966)

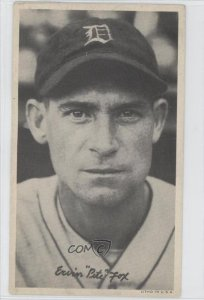
- Right fielder
- Born: March 8, 1909; Evansville, Indiana, U.S.
- Died: July 5, 1966 (aged 57); Detroit, Michigan, U.S.
- Batted: Right Threw: Right

MLB debut
- April 12, 1933, for the Detroit Tigers

Last MLB appearance
- September 23, 1945, for the Boston Red Sox

MLB statistics
- Batting average: .298
- Home runs: 65
- Runs batted in: 694
- Stats at Baseball Reference

Teams
- Detroit Tigers (1933–1940); Boston Red Sox (1941–1945)

Career highlights and awards
- All-Star (1944); World Series champion (1935)

Ervin "Pete" Fox (March 8, 1909 – July 5, 1966) was an American professional baseball player from 1930 to 1946. He played 13 seasons in Major League Baseball, principally as a right fielder, for the Detroit Tigers from 1933 to 1940 and the Boston Red Sox from 1941 to 1945. Though his given name was Ervin, Fox became known as "Pete" in 1932 when fans in Beaumont, Texas, dubbed him "Rabbit" in reference to his speed, with the nickname reportedly evolving into "Peter Rabbit" and then simply "Pete".

Fox compiled a .298 career batting average and finished among the American League leaders in batting average four times—8th in 1935 (.321), 10th in 1937 (.331), 9th in 1943 (.288), and 6th in 1944 (.315). His .321 average in 1935 was third highest on the Tigers team that defeated the Chicago Cubs in the 1935 World Series. Fox also ranked among the American League leaders in stolen bases on seven occasions between 1934 and 1944.

== Early years ==
Fox was born in Evansville, Indiana, in 1909, the son of a fire captain. He graduated from Bosse High School in Evansville. After graduating from high school, Fox worked at a furniture factory in Evansville and played sandlot baseball.

== Playing career ==
=== Minor leagues ===
Fox began his professional baseball career in 1930 with the Evansville Hubs of the Illinois–Indiana–Iowa League. After only seven games with the Hubs, Fox was sent to the Wheeling Stogies of the Mid-Atlantic League. He appeared in 106 games for the Stogies in 1930, compiling a .339 batting average with 24 doubles, 15 triples, and 14 home runs in 422 at bats.

After a strong showing with Wheeling, Fox was recalled to Evansville for the 1931 season. He hit .302 with 33 doubles, 12 triples, and 8 home runs in 490 at bats.

Fox spent the 1932 season playing for the Beaumont Exporters team that won the Texas League pennant. His teammates in Beaumont that year included Hank Greenberg, Schoolboy Rowe, Elden Auker, and Flea Clifton. Each of these players would play together on Detroit's 1934 and 1935 pennant-winning teams. Fox led the Texas League in 1932 with a .357 batting average. He also hit 23 doubles, 11 triples, and 19 home runs for Beaumont. Fox, whose first name was actually Ervin, also won the nickname "Pete" while playing for Beaumont. Due to Fox's speed, Beaumont fans began calling him "Rabbit" which then reportedly evolved into "Peter Rabbit" and then simply "Pete".

=== Detroit Tigers ===
In 1933, Fox joined the Detroit Tigers and became the team's regular center fielder, starting 116 games at the position. He compiled a .288 batting average with 26 doubles, 13 triples, and 7 home runs in his rookie season. Fox was one of three rookies for Detroit in 1933, along with Hank Greenberg and Marv Owen, who would be consistent starters for the 1934 and 1935 pennant-winning teams.

In 1934, the Tigers acquired left fielder Goose Goslin, Jo-Jo White took over as the team's center fielder, and Fox became the team's starting right fielder. In his first season in right field, Fox struggled at the plate with a .285 batting average, but he led the American League with four outfield double plays. The 1934 Tigers won the American League pennant, and Fox set a major league record by hitting six doubles in the 1934 World Series in a losing effort against the St. Louis Cardinals.

The 1935 season was a breakout season for Fox as he helped lead the Tigers to an American League pennant and a World Series championship over the Chicago Cubs. After Fox began the season with a batting slump, a trade that would have sent Fox to another team fell through. Fox began hitting at a torrid pace after word of the trade became public. He had hitting streaks of 29 and 17 games and had eight hits and 10 runs batted in a double header against the St. Louis Browns on June 30, 1935. The Sporting News in a front page profile in late July 1935 credited Fox with being the Tigers' spark plug:

Super work on the part of a single player often provides the winning accelerant for a team which otherwise might remain close to mediocrity in the result column. . . . This season it has been Ervin (Pete) Fox, little outfielder, who has supplied the winning spark, with a recent run of 29 games in which he hit safely having witnessed the definite upswing of Mickey Cochrane's Bengals.

During the 1935 season, Fox ranked among the American League's leaders in multiple offensive and defensive categories. His .321 batting average was eighth best in the league (third best on the Tigers behind Hank Greenberg and Charlie Gehringer), and his .513 slugging percentage was fifth best in the league. He also ranked sixth in runs scored (116), eighth in stolen bases (14), second in times hit by a pitch (6), and fourth in range factor among right fielders (1.90).

During the six-game 1935 World Series win over the Chicago Cubs, Fox led both teams with ten hits and a .385 batting average. The Sporting News called Fox "the individual hitting star of the series."

In 1936, the Tigers acquired future Baseball Hall of Fame outfielder Al Simmons to play alongside another future Hall of Fame outfielder Goose Goslin. The reconfiguration of the outfield, combined with multiple injuries, resulted in Fox losing his position as the team's starting right fielder. Fox suffered an "attack of lumbago" in early May, a sprained finger in July, and was called home from a road trip in August when his five-month son became ill. Gee Walker became the Tigers' starting right fielder and Fox was relegated to a backup role, starting only 49 games in right field in 1936. He compiled a .305 batting average in 220 at bats.

In 1937, with Simmons and Goslin having left the Tigers, Fox returned to the starting lineup, playing 105 games in right field, 28 in center field, and 11 in left field. Fox responded to his starting assignment with career bests in batting average (.331) and doubles (39). Along with Fox's outstanding season, Detroit second baseman Charlie Gehringer won the 1937 batting championship with a .371 average and first baseman Hank Greenberg added a team record 183 RBIs. The 1937 Tigers compiled an 89–65 record and finished in second place behind the New York Yankees. The 1937 Tigers tied a major league record with four players (Fox, Gehringer, Greenberg, and Gee Walker) each compiling 200 or more hits.

Fox began the 1938 season at a torrid pace with the bat. By early May, Fox was batting .451. Although his average dipped to .293 by the end of the 1938 season, Fox compiled a career high with 96 RBIs. Fox also ranked among the American League leaders in stolen bases (5th with 16), hits (10th with 186), and triples (7th with 10). Defensively, he led all American League outfielders in games played (155) and fielding percentage (.994) during the 1938 season.

Fox remained the Tigers' starting right fielder in 1939. He compiled a batting average of .295, and his 2.28 range factor in 1939 led all American League right fielders. In 1940, Fox and Bruce Campbell alternated as Detroit's right fielder. The Tigers won the 1940 pennant, but Campbell started all seven games in the 1940 World Series between the Cincinnati Reds and Tigers. Fox did have one pinch hit at bat in the 1940 Series. In three World Series, Fox played 14 games and batted .327 in 55 at bats.

On December 12, 1940, the Boston Red Sox purchased Fox from the Tigers for a sum reported to be slightly in excess of the waiver price. The sale of Fox was reported to be a source of "genuine regret" among Detroit fans, and Detroit sports writer Sam Greene wrote that Fox had "undeniable appeal as a steady, hard-working craftsman." Greene also wrote in The Sporting News that Fox had been overshadowed in Detroit by superstars Hank Greenberg, Charlie Gehringer, Goose Goslin, and Mickey Cochrane, and noted that it is "often said of Fox that he was 'the most under rated' player among the Battling Bengals."

=== Boston Red Sox ===
Fox was a backup outfielder for the Red Sox during the 1941 and 1942 seasons, appearing in 62 games as an outfielder in 1941 and 71 games in 1942. In 1943, the Red Sox lost outfielders Ted Williams and Dom DiMaggio to military service, making room for Fox to emerge as the Red Sox starting right fielder in 1943. He was an All-Star in the 1944 season, in which he batted .315 (6th best in the league) with 37 doubles.

=== Pacific Coast League ===
In 1946, Fox played for the Oakland Oaks of the Pacific Coast League under manager Casey Stengel. He appeared in 57 games for the Oaks, compiling a .258 batting average.

== Family and later years ==
After his playing career ended, Fox served as a manager for minor league baseball teams in Pawtucket (New England), Waterloo (Three-I) and Hot Springs (Cotton States). He also served as a scout for the Detroit Tigers and Chicago White Sox. He retired from baseball in the early 1950s after his vision deteriorated due to the development of cataracts. He subsequently worked as a manufacturer's representative in Detroit.

Fox was married in 1927 to Elizabeth ("Bettye") Stuteville. Pete and Bettye had one daughter, Beverly June, and one son, James. Peter fathered a son, Donald, in a second marriage (Helen). Don became a pitcher in the Boston Red Sox organization, and James became an all-city football player at his father's alma mater, Bosse High School.

In 1966, Fox died in Detroit, Michigan, at 57, of cancer. He was interred at Detroit's Woodlawn Cemetery. In 1980, Fox was posthumously inducted into the Indiana Baseball Hall of Fame. His daughter, Beverly Markey, and his grandson, Stephen Markey, were present to receive the honor.
