= 1935 Detroit Tigers season =

Major League Baseball season

1935 Detroit Tigers
- World Series Champion; American League Champion
- League: American League
- Ballpark: Navin Field
- City: Detroit, Michigan
- Record: 93–58 (.616)
- League place: 1st
- Owners: Frank Navin
- Managers: Mickey Cochrane
- Radio: WWJ (AM) (Ty Tyson); WXYZ (Harry Heilmann)

The 1935 Detroit Tigers won the 1935 World Series, defeating the Chicago Cubs 4 games to 2. The season was their 35th since they entered the American League in 1901. It was the first World Series championship for the Tigers.

== The players ==
As the 1934 Detroit Tigers won a club-record 101 games, the team made few changes in the off-season to alter their winning combination.

=== Catcher/Manager: Mickey Cochrane ===
Hall of Famer Mickey Cochrane returned as the team's manager and catcher. Known as "Black Mike", Cochrane is considered one of the greatest catchers of all time. In 1935, he hit .319 (9th in the AL) with a .452 on-base percentage (3rd in the AL), 96 walks (4th in the AL), 93 runs scored, and 33 doubles. Aside from his contributions as a player, Cochrane was invaluable as a manager and leader. Charlie Gehringer later said: "When Mickey was managing the Tigers from behind the plate I can't remember him ever fouling up anything. Seemed like he made snap judgments that always worked out well, especially in '34 and '35."

=== Infield: Greenberg, Gehringer, Rogell, and Owen ===
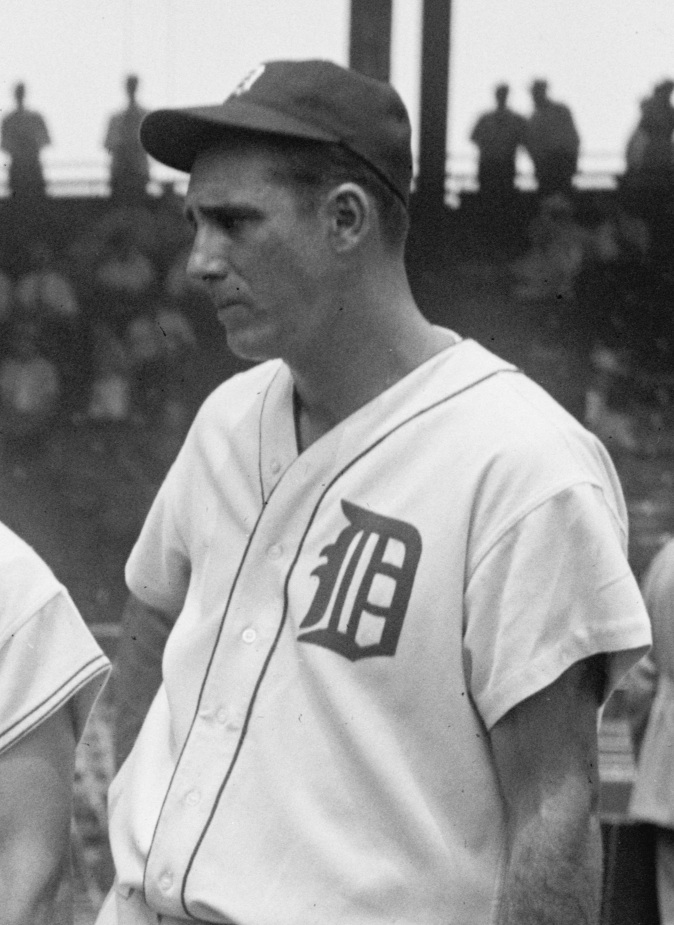
Hank Greenberg, Hall of Famer and 2-time MVP

The Detroit infield of the 1934–1935 seasons was one of the best-hitting combinations in MLB history. With Hank Greenberg at first, Charlie Gehringer at second, Billy Rogell at shortstop, and Marv Owen at third, the 1934 Tigers infield collected 462 RBIs (139 by Greenberg, 127 by Gehringer, 100 by Rogell, and 96 by Owen) and 179 doubles (63 by Greenberg, 50 by Gehringer, 34 by Owen and 32 by Rogell).

"Hammerin' Hank" Greenberg led the major leagues with 168 RBIs in 1935—the ninth highest single season total in major league history. The second highest RBI total in the AL that year was Lou Gehrig's 120—48 fewer than Hank. Greenberg also led the major leagues in 1935 with 36 home runs, 98 extra base hits, 389 total bases, and 159 runs created. He also hit for average, with a .328 batting average (7th in the AL), .411 on-base percentage (6th in the AL), and .628 slugging percentage (2nd in the AL). Greenberg was named the American League's Most Valuable Player for 1935.

Charlie Gehringer also had a terrific season, hitting .330 for the year (5th best in the AL). He was also among the league leaders with 123 runs (2nd in the AL), 201 hits (5th in the AL), 125 runs created (5th in the AL), 306 total bases (6th in the AL), 19 home runs (8th in the AL), and 108 RBIs (9th in the AL). Gehringer also led AL second basemen with 489 assists and a .985 fielding percentage. Gehringer finished 6th in the AL MVP voting in 1935. Known for his consistency as a hitter and fielder, Gehringer was given the nickname "The Mechanical Man" by Yankee pitcher Lefty Gomez. Mickey Cochrane joked that "Charlie says `hello' on Opening Day, `goodbye' on closing day, and in between hits .350."

Shortstop Billy Rogell hit .275 and scored 88 runs in 1935 while drawing 80 walks. Rogell also led AL shortstops with 104 double plays and a .971 fielding percentage. Rogell and Gehringer played over 1,000 games together as the Tigers' double play combination. Rogell's fiery demeanor was a stark contrast to the calm, quiet demeanor of Gehringer. Once, after both failed to cover second on a steal attempt, Mickey Cochrane charged out from behind the plate shouting at Rogell and Gehringer. As reported in The New Bill James Historical Baseball Abstract: "Rogell, astonished, looked at Gehringer to see if he was going to say anything. Gehringer, of course, had nothing to say. 'Goddamn you,' yelled Rogell. 'Don't you come charging out here telling me how to play shortstop. You go back there and do the catching, and I'll play shortstop. If I'm not good enough, you can find someone else.' Cochrane went back to his own position."

Marv Owen was the one Tiger starter whose performance dropped off significantly from 1934 to 1935. In 1934, Owen had batted .317 with 96 RBIs and finished 9th in the AL MVP voting. In 1935, his average dropped 54 points to .263, and his RBI production fell to 71. Owen is remembered for a famous incident in Game 7 of the 1934 World Series. Joe Medwick tripled in the 6th inning with the Cardinals ahead by 7 runs. He slid hard into Owen at third, knocking him down. The two fought, and Detroit fans pelted Medwick with fruit and garbage when he returned to left field. As the fan reaction escalated, Commissioner Kenesaw Mountain Landis ordered Medwick removed from the game. Owen batted just .069 (2–29) in the 1934 World Series and .050 (1–20) in the 1935 World Series. He set a post-season record for the most consecutive plate appearances between hits with 31.

Rounding out the infield was utility infielder Flea Clifton. Clifton played in 43 games during the 1935 regular season, with a .255 batting average. However, when Hank Greenberg broke his wrist in Game 2 of the 1935 World Series, Marv Owen moved to first base, and Clifton stepped in as the starting third baseman. Clifton was 0-for-16 with 4 strikeouts in the Series. Clifton had been teammates with Hank Greenberg in the minor leagues, and the two became friends. In his autobiography, Greenberg joked about Clifton's unusual diet: "On the road, he used to eat nothing but doughnuts and bananas. He said they were cheap and filling and stretched his meal money. Flea was the only ballplayer who could show a profit on $1-a-day meal money."

=== Outfield: Goslin, Fox, White and Walker ===
In the outfield, Hall of Famer Goose Goslin played in left field. Pete Fox played in right field. The speedy Jo-Jo White and Gee Walker shared responsibility for center field, with White playing in 98 games.

Pete Fox led the way among the outfielders, batting .321 with 116 runs scored, 38 doubles, and 15 home runs. Fox also had a 29-game hitting streak in June and July. During the hitting streak, Fox drove in 10 runs in a double-header against the St. Louis Browns. During the six-game 1935 World Series, Fox also led the team in hits (10), RBIs (4), and batting average (.385).

Goose Goslin had a good year with 109 RBIs, 172 hits, and 34 doubles. After leading the Washington Senators to American League pennants in 1924, 1925, and 1933, owner Clark Griffith traded Goslin to Detroit before the 1934 season. Griffith told Goose he simply couldn't afford to pay his salary. With stars Goslin, Gehringer and Greenberg, the 1934 and 1935 Tigers became known as the "G-Men." Goslin was the hero of the 1935 World Series, as he drove in the winning run in Games 6. With the game tied 3–3, Goslin came to bat in the bottom of the 9th inning with two outs and Mickey Cochrane on 2nd base. Goslin hit a walk-off single to right, scoring Cochrane, as the Tigers won the Series.

Center fielder Jo-Jo White led the team with 19 stolen bases and also contributed 12 triples. White's real first name was Joyner, but he was called "Jo-Jo" because of the way he pronounced his native state of Georgia. Hank Greenberg, who was raised in the Bronx was roommates with White, and according to Greenberg the two of them "used to fight the Civil War every night." Greenberg recalled a game in which White stole home with Greenberg at bat: "He deprived me of a good chance at an RBI, and he did it deliberately because he knew it would burn me up."

The Tigers fourth outfielder, Gee Walker played 45 games in center field but also covered 29 games in left and 11 games in right. Known as "The Madman from Mississippi", Walker was a fiery competitor and a clown. He hit over .300 for the 1935 Tigers, but his reputation for being inattentive and overzealous on the basepaths drew the ire of manager Mickey Cochrane. During the 1934 World Series, he was picked off first while arguing with the Cardinals' bench. On another occasion, he tried to steal a base while the batter was being given an intentional walk.

=== Pitching: Bridges, Rowe, Auker and Crowder ===
The pitching staff was led by starters Tommy Bridges, Schoolboy Rowe, Alvin Crowder, and Elden Auker.

Tommy Bridges was the only 20-game winner with a record of 21–10. In 34 starts, Bridges threw 23 complete games. He led the American League with 163 strikeouts, and his 3.51 ERA was 6th best in the league. He finished the season 11th in the American League MVP voting. In a nationwide poll, Bridges was named the No. 2 sports hero of 1935, behind Notre Dame football player Andy Pilney.

Elden Auker, a 24-year-old underhand pitcher out of Kansas A&M, also had a big year for the 1935 Tigers. Auker led the American League in win percentage (.720) with a record of 18–7. During the 1935 World Series, Auker was interviewed by a young Cubs broadcaster, Ronald Reagan. When they met after Reagan had been elected Governor of California, Reagan told him, "You probably won't remember me, but I'll remember you as long as I live." The 1935 radio interview, Reagan said, "was my first big break."

After making a big splash in 1934 with an American League record 16 consecutive wins, Schoolboy Rowe had another big year in 1935. Schoolboy had become a fan favorite not only for his pitching performance in 1934 but for his nationally publicized romance. While appearing on the Eddie Cantor radio show, Rowe famously asked his fiancée, "How'm I doing, Edna honey?" The line endeared Schoolboy to the nation, and also resulted in relentless teasing from opposing players and fans. Schoolboy and Edna married after the 1934 season and had their first child during the 1935 season. Schoolboy led the league in 1935 with six shutouts and finished the season with a 19–13 record in 34 starts. Despite a 2.51 ERA in the 1935 World Series, Rowe had a 1–2 record. He was the losing pitcher in Game 1, despite striking out 8 batters, pitching a complete game and allowing only 2 earned runs. In Game 3, Rowe got the win, pitching 4 innings in relief. But Game 5 was another tough loss, as Schoolboy threw a complete game and allowed 2 earned runs, but the Tigers scored only once.

The Tigers' #4 starter was 36-year-old Alvin Crowder, who served in the U.S. Army during its occupation of Siberia after World War I. Crowder, known as "General", was 16–10 in his 32 starts. The General pitched a complete game in Game 4 of the 1935 World Series for a 2–1 victory. Crowder pitched in three World Series consecutively (1933–1935), posting a record of 1–2 with 3.81 ERA in 26 innings pitched.

The Tigers' main reliever in 1935 was Elon Hogsett, who appeared in 40 games, finishing 30, with an ERA of 3.54. When "Chief" Hogsett would take the mound at Navin Field, Detroit fans greeted him with "war whoops." Hogsett later reported that, while he was "one-thirty-second Cherokee on my mother's side", he got the nickname in the minor leagues when he "roomed with a full-blooded Kiowa Indian and the nickname just kind of stuck."

== Regular season ==
Detroit — the defending American League champion — finished 93–58, three games ahead of the second place New York Yankees. The 1935 Tigers outscored their opponents 919 to 665.

=== Season summary ===
After losing the 1934 World Series in a close seven-game series with the Gashouse Gang from St. Louis, the Tigers were determined to win the first championship for the City of Detroit since the Detroit Wolverines won the National League pennant in 1887.

The season started out poorly. Schoolboy Rowe lost on Opening Day, and the Tigers were 2–9 after two weeks of play. At the end of April, the Tigers were in last place. By the end of May, the Tigers had started to turn things around but still had a mediocre 20–18 record.

On June 25, 1935, the Yankees were in first place, and the Tigers were still playing unexceptionally with a record of 33–28. However, the Tigers got red hot after that, going 35–10 between June 26 and August 15, 1935. During that period, they put together win streaks of 10 games (June 30 to July 7) and 9 games (July 31 to August 11). It was during the second streak on July 26 when the Tigers passed the Yankees and moved into first place for good.

Detroit remained hot through Labor Day, with a record of 85–44 and 10-game lead over the Yankees on the morning of September 8.

But the Tigers' bats went cold during the last three weeks of the season as the team went 8–14 to close the regular season.

Despite losing 14 of their final 22 games, the Tigers clinched their second straight American League pennant on September 21 by winning both games of a double-header against the St. Louis Browns. Tommy Bridges won the opener, 6–2, and Elden Auker pitched a complete-game shutout to win the second game, 2–0.

=== Season standings ===
American League
Team	W	L	Pct.	GB	Home	Road
Detroit Tigers	93	58	.616	—	53‍–‍25	40‍–‍33
New York Yankees	89	60	.597	3	41‍–‍33	48‍–‍27
Cleveland Indians	82	71	.536	12	48‍–‍29	34‍–‍42
Boston Red Sox	78	75	.510	16	41‍–‍37	37‍–‍38
Chicago White Sox	74	78	.487	19½	42‍–‍34	32‍–‍44
Washington Senators	67	86	.438	27	37‍–‍39	30‍–‍47
St. Louis Browns	65	87	.428	28½	31‍–‍44	34‍–‍43
Philadelphia Athletics	58	91	.389	34	30‍–‍42	28‍–‍49

=== Record vs. opponents ===
1935 American League record Sources:
Team	BOS	CWS	CLE	DET	NYY	PHA	SLB	WSH
Boston	—	13–9	9–13–1	9–13	9–12	16–6	10–12	12–10
Chicago	9–13	—	10–12	11–11	9–11	12–10	11–11–1	12–10
Cleveland	13–9–1	12–10	—	7–15–1	8–14	12–10	15–6–1	15–7
Detroit	13–9	11–11	15–7–1	—	11–11	14–5	17–5	12–10
New York	12–9	11–9	14–8	11–11	—	14–6	12–10	15–7
Philadelphia	6–16	10–12	10–12	5–14	6–14	—	11–11	10–12
St. Louis	12–10	11–11–1	6–15–1	5–17	10–12	11–11	—	10–11–1
Washington	10–12	10–12	7–15	10–12	7–15	12–10	11–10–1	—

=== Roster ===
1935 Detroit Tigers
Roster
Pitchers: 13 Elden Auker; 10 Tommy Bridges; 16 Alvin Crowder; 15 Carl Fischer; 12 Clyde Hatter; 17 Elon Hogsett; 26 Roxie Lawson; 11 Firpo Marberry; 14 Schoolboy Rowe; 18 Vic Sorrell; 19 Joe Sullivan	Catchers: 3 Mickey Cochrane; 23 Ray Hayworth; 21 Frank Reiber; Infielders: 24 Flea Clifton; 2 Charlie Gehringer; 5 Hank Greenberg; 8 Marv Owen; 7 Billy Rogell; 22 Heinie Schuble	Outfielders: 9 Pete Fox; 4 Goose Goslin; 27 Chet Morgan; 15 Hugh Shelley; 6 Gee Walker; 30 Hub Walker; 25 Jo-Jo White	Manager: 3 Mickey Cochrane; Coaches: 32 Del Baker; 31 Cy Perkins

=== Season highlights ===
- April 17, 1935: The Tigers lost on Opening Day against the Chicago White Sox by a score of 7–6. Schoolboy Rowe was the losing pitcher.
- April 18, 1935: Jo-Jo White tied an AL record with 5 walks off White Sox pitchers. The last walk forced in the winning run in the 9th as the Tigers win‚ 5–4.
- April 29, 1935: The Tigers bats finally broke loose, as the Tigers crushed the St. Louis Browns 18–0. Tommy Bridges was the winning pitcher over Bobo Newsom. Bobo would later help the Tigers win a pennant in 1940.
- May 13, 1935: Schoolboy Rowe shut out the New York Yankees 3–0. Lefty Gomez was the losing pitcher for the Yankees.
- May 14, 1935: The Tigers took their second straight victory over the Yankees, as Alvin Crowder won 10–4.
- May 15, 1935: Lou Gehrig stole home in a 4–0 Yankees win over the Tigers.
- May 19, 1935: The Tigers scored 16 runs to beat the Washington Senators 16–6.
- May 20, 1935: A's pitcher George Caster‚ following the advice of Jimmie Foxx‚ walked Charlie Gehringer in the 11th inning to pitch to Hank Greenberg. Greenberg proceeded to knock in 2 runs as the Tigers defeated the A's, 8–6.
- May 25, 1935: The Tigers defeated the Red Sox 3–2 on a 2-run home run by Hank Greenberg in the 6th inning. In the 4th inning, Greenberg hit a line drive at pitcher Fritz Ostermueller, breaking his cheekbone and several teeth and sending him to the hospital.
- May 26, 1935: The Tigers were shut out by the Yankees 2–0.
- June 16, 1935: The Tigers completed a three-game sweep over the Philadelphia Athletics. The combined score of the three games was 34–7.
- June 21, 1935: After 3 straight losses to the Yankees, Schoolboy Rowe shut out the Yankees, 7–0, for the second time in 1935. Rowe's wife, Edna, had just given birth to their first child.
- June 24, 1935: Tommy Bridges pitched 13 innings for the Tigers and left the game tied 8–8. Elden Auker pitched in relief and knocked in the winning run as the Tigers win 9–8.
- June 30, 1935: Pete Fox, in the midst of a 29-game hitting streak, led the Tigers to victories in both games of a double-header against the Browns. The Tigers won the opener 18–1 and then won the second game 11–6. Fox drove in 10 runs‚ six of them in the opener when he hit his second grand slam of the month. Fox had 8 hits and scored 4 runs in each game. Schoolboy Rowe and Alvin Crowder were the winning pitchers.
- July 5, 1935: The Tigers beat the St. Louis Browns‚ 16–1 as Hank Greenberg had 4 hits, 4 RBIs, scores 4 runs, and hit 2 home runs.
- July 7, 1935: The Tigers defeated the Browns‚ 12–5‚ for their 10th straight win. Detroit scored 11 runs in the first three innings. Hank Greenberg had a double, a triple and three RBIs to give him 100 RBIs at the All-Star break.
- July 10, 1935: In the first game after the All Star Game, the Tigers' win streak ended at 10 games‚ despite a record-tying 10 doubles, in a 12–11 loss to the Senators.
- July 11, 1935: The Tigers defeated the Senators in 10 innings, 7–6, but Pete Fox failed to get a hit, as his hitting streak came to an end at 29 games. Charlie Gehringer hit a home run and a triple, and Goose Goslin had 3 hits including a home run.
- July 13, 1935: Doc Cramer went 6-for-6 for the Athletics in the opening game of a double-header against Elden Auker. Jimmie Foxx also went 3-for-3 as the A's crushed the Tigers, 18–5. The Tigers won the second game, as Hank Greenberg hit his 26th home run, helping Tommy Bridges win his 12th game.
- July 16, 1935: The A's beat the Tigers‚ 8–2, and the Yankees defeated the White Sox to take a 2½-game lead over Detroit.
- July 21, 1935: The Tigers scored 3 runs in the 9th inning against Lefty Grove and the Red Sox. In the bottom of the 9th, Red Sox pitcher Wes Ferrell pinch hit for Grove and hit a home run with 2 outs and 2 men on to give Boston a 7–6 win.
- July 24, 1935: The Tigers beat the Yankees 4–0 as Alvin Crowder pitched a shutout. The Tigers were a fraction of a percentage point behind the Yankees. Jo-Jo White led off the game with his first major league home run‚ off Red Ruffing.
- July 26, 1935: Washington beat the Yankees, knocking them out of first for the first time since May 30.
- August 14, 1935: Schoolboy Rowe got the win over the Senators 18–2 and also went 5-for-5 at the plate. Schoolboy had a double, a triple, scores 3 runs, and collected three RBIs. With the Yankees losing, the Tigers had built a 6-game lead. This marked the second time in 1935 that the Tigers scored 18 runs in a game.
- August 18, 1935: Schoolboy Rowe is hit on the hand by a line drive in the 3rd inning. After a 12-minute delay‚ Rowe returned and allows just one more hit. Detroit beat the Yankees‚ 6–0. The victory was Schoolboy's third shutout of the Yankees in 1935.
- September 8, 1935: In the second game of a double header, Elden Auker made it into the 8th inning with a no-hitter. A's slugger Jimmie Foxx doubled in the 8th, but Auker got the win, 15–1, as the Tigers collected 20 hits. Cochrane had 3 hits in each game for Detroit. The sweep increased the Tigers' AL lead to 10 games.
- September 10, 1935: The Tigers were shut out 6–0 by the Senators. Schoolboy Rowe was the losing pitcher.
- September 13, 1935: The Tigers beat the Yankees‚ 13–5, and Schoolboy Rowe got the win. Hank Greenberg had 3 hits including a home run. Lou Gehrig hit two home runs in the game.
- September 14, 1935: The Tigers split a double-header with the Yankees. Alvin Crowder lost the opener 2–1, and Roxie Lawson held the Yankees to 1 run in the second game. Hank Greenberg‚ leading the league in hitting at .346‚ was hitless in both games, and struck out five times. The New York American reported afterward: "The hooting and jeering which some of the fans turned loose against Hank wasn't much of a tribute to the sportsmanship of his home town."
- September 21, 1935: The Tigers clinched the American League pennant by winning both games of a double-header against the Browns. Tommy Bridges won the opener, 6–2, and Elden Auker pitched a complete-game shutout to win the second game, 2–0. The Tigers went 1–6 after clinching the pennant.
- September 22, 1935: Schoolboy Rowe lost a 1–0 game to the Browns. Schoolboy committed an error in the 6th inning that allowed the only run to score. This was only the fifth time in 1935 that the Tigers were shut out.
- September 25, 1935: The Tigers lost to the Indians, 3–2. Elon Hogsett took over in the 1st inning when starter Elden Auker was hit on the wrist by a line drive off the bat of Joe Vosmik. Hogsett hit a solo home run over the right field wall in the 6th inning.
- September 29, 1935: The White Sox swept the Tigers in a double-header on the last day of the regular season. The Sox hit an AL record 10 singles in the 2nd inning of game 2 off Elden Auker. The Sox won 14–2. Firpo Marberry, who had been released by the Tigers in June‚ was the umpire. Firpo worked as an umpire for the second half of the 1935 season.
- October 7, 1935: The Tigers won the World Series with a 4–3 victory in Game 6. The celebration in the streets of Detroit lasted until three in the morning.
- October 20, 1935: By a unanimous vote‚ Hank Greenberg was named the American League's Most Valuable Player.
- April 18, 1936: The Tigers, along with numerous other Detroit champions, are honored during the Champions Day celebration.

== Player stats ==
= Indicates team leader

= Indicates league leader

=== Batting ===
==== Starters by position ====
Note: Pos = Position; G = Games played; AB = At bats; H = Hits; Avg. = Batting average; HR = Home runs; RBI = Runs batted in

Pos	Player	G	AB	H	Avg.	HR	RBI
C	Mickey Cochrane	115	411	131	.319	5	47
1B	Hank Greenberg	152	619	203	.328	36*	168
2B	Charlie Gehringer	150	610	201	.330	19	108
3B	Marv Owen	134	483	127	.263	2	71
SS	Billy Rogell	150	560	154	.275	6	71
OF	Goose Goslin	147	590	172	.292	9	109
OF	Pete Fox	131	517	166	.321	15	73
OF	Jo-Jo White	114	412	99	.240	2	32

*Tied with Jimmie Foxx (Athletics)

==== Other batters ====
Note: G = Games played; AB = At bats; H = Hits; Avg. = Batting average; HR = Home runs; RBI = Runs batted in

Player	G	AB	H	Avg.	HR	RBI
Gee Walker	98	362	109	.301	7	53
Ray Hayworth	51	175	54	.309	0	22
Flea Clifton	43	110	28	.255	0	9
Hub Walker	9	25	4	.160	0	1
Chet Morgan	14	23	4	.174	0	1
Frank Reiber	8	11	3	.273	0	1
Heinie Schuble	11	8	2	.250	0	0
Hugh Shelley	7	8	2	.250	0	1

Note: pitchers' batting statistics not included

=== Pitching ===
==== Starting pitchers ====
Note: G = Games pitched; IP = Innings pitched; W = Wins; L = Losses; ERA = Earned run average; SO = Strikeouts

Player	G	IP	W	L	ERA	SO
Schoolboy Rowe	42	275.2	19	13	3.69	140
Tommy Bridges	36	274.1	21	10	3.51	163
Alvin Crowder	33	241.0	16	10	4.26	59
Elden Auker	36	195.0	18	7	3.83	63

==== Other pitchers ====
Note: G = Games pitched; IP = Innings pitched; W = Wins; L = Losses; ERA = Earned run average; SO = Strikeouts

Player	G	IP	W	L	ERA	SO
Joe Sullivan	25	125.2	6	6	3.51	53
Vic Sorrell	12	51.1	4	3	4.03	22
Roxie Lawson	7	40.0	3	1	1.58	16
Clyde Hatter	8	33.1	3	1	1.58	16
Firpo Marberry	5	19.0	0	1	4.26	7
Carl Fischer	3	12.0	0	1	6.00	7

==== Relief pitchers ====
Note: G = Games pitched; W = Wins; L = Losses; SV = Saves; ERA = Earned run average; SO = Strikeouts

Player	G	W	L	SV	ERA	SO
Elon Hogsett	40	6	6	5	3.54	39

== 1935 World Series ==
The 1935 World Series featured the Detroit Tigers and the Chicago Cubs, with the Tigers winning in six games for their first championship in five World Series appearances. They had lost in 1907, 1908, 1909, and 1934.

The Cubs had the better regular season record and had a 21-game win streak during the pennant stretch. The Tigers, on the other hand, went 8–14 in their last 22 games. Based on momentum, it appeared the Cubs would roll past the Tigers.

The Cubs won Game 1, 3–0, on a 4-hit shutout by pitcher Lon Warneke. Schoolboy Rowe took the loss.

The Tigers evened the Series in Game 2, with an 8–3 win, but the Tigers lost Hank Greenberg who fractured his left wrist when colliding with Cubs catcher Gabby Hartnett. Greenberg had tried to score from first on a single. He finished the game, but he developed severe pain on the train ride to Chicago that night, and x-rays revealed fractures of two bones in his wrist. Greenberg was sidelined for the rest of the Series, and Mickey Cochrane was left to decide who could replace Greenberg. Initially, Cochrane decided to play first base himself and have backup catcher Ray Hayworth take over at catcher. But Tigers owner Frank Navin ordered Cochrane to move third baseman Marv Owen to first base and play utility infielder Flea Clifton at third base. Cochrane disagreed, as Clifton was the weakest hitter on the team, and Owen was in a slump. Navin insisted, and Owen went one for twenty in the Series, while Flea went 0-for-16 in the Series.

In Game 3, the Cubs tied the game in the bottom of the 9th, but the Tigers won it with an unearned run in the 11th inning. In the 3rd inning, umpire George Moriarty (who had played for the Tigers from 1909 to 1915 and managed the Tigers from 1927 to 1928) called Phil Cavarretta out in a close play at second base. When the Cubs protested, Moriarty verbally abused the Cubs, and ejected Cubs' manager Charlie Grimm and player Bill Jurges. After the game, Grimm said: "If a manager can't go out and make a decent kick, what the hell is the game coming to? I didn't swear at him but he swore at us." Coach Roy Johnson accused Moriarty of making improper reflections on the Cubs' ancestry. Judge Landis later levied $200 fines on Moriarty‚ Grimm‚ and Jurges for their conduct in the World Series.

In Game 4, Alvin Crowder pitched a 2–1 complete game victory. The Tigers won on an unearned run in the 6th inning.

In Game 5, Cubs' pitcher Lon Warneke kept the Cubs alive with 6 innings of shutout ball for his 2nd win. The Cubs won 3–1 on a 2-run home run by Chuck Klein off losing pitcher Schoolboy Rowe.

In Game 6, Tommy Bridges pitched a complete game victory to win the Series for Detroit. With the score tied 3–3 in the top of the 9th inning, Bridges gave up a leadoff triple to Stan Hack, but retired the next three batters without the runner on third scoring. In the bottom of the 9th, Goose Goslin drove in the winning run with 2 outs. After the game, manager Mickey Cochrane said the following of Bridges' gutsy performance: "A hundred and fifty pounds of courage. If there ever is a payoff on courage this little 150- pound pitcher is the greatest World Series hero."

Delirious Detroit fans rushed onto Navin Field in celebration after Goslin's game-winning hit. The celebration spilled out onto Michigan Avenue and Trumbull. People from throughout Detroit flooded the central city in a celebration that newspapers reported went on until three in the morning. For a few hours, the worries of the Great Depression were gone and the only thing that mattered was the Tigers.

Detroit owner Frank Navin, then 64 years old, had been running the organization for 30 years and had seen four of his teams win American League pennants, only to lose four World Series. On November 13, 1935, five weeks after the Tigers finally won the World Series, Navin suffered a heart attack while riding a horse and died.

Game	Score	Date	Location	Attendance	Winning Pitcher	Losing Pitcher
1	Cubs – 3, Tigers – 0	October 2	Navin Field	47,391	Lon Warneke	Schoolboy Rowe
2	Cubs – 3, Tigers – 8	October 3	Navin Field	46,742	Tommy Bridges	Charlie Root
3	Tigers – 6, Cubs – 5 (11 innings)	October 4	Wrigley Field	45,532	Schoolboy Rowe	Larry French
4	Tigers – 2, Cubs – 1	October 5	Wrigley Field	49,350	Alvin Crowder	Tex Carleton
5	Tigers – 1, Cubs – 3	October 6	Wrigley Field	49,237	Lon Warneke	Schoolboy Rowe
6	Cubs – 3, Tigers – 4	October 7	Navin Field	48,420	Tommy Bridges	Larry French

=== Detroit: "City of Champions" ===
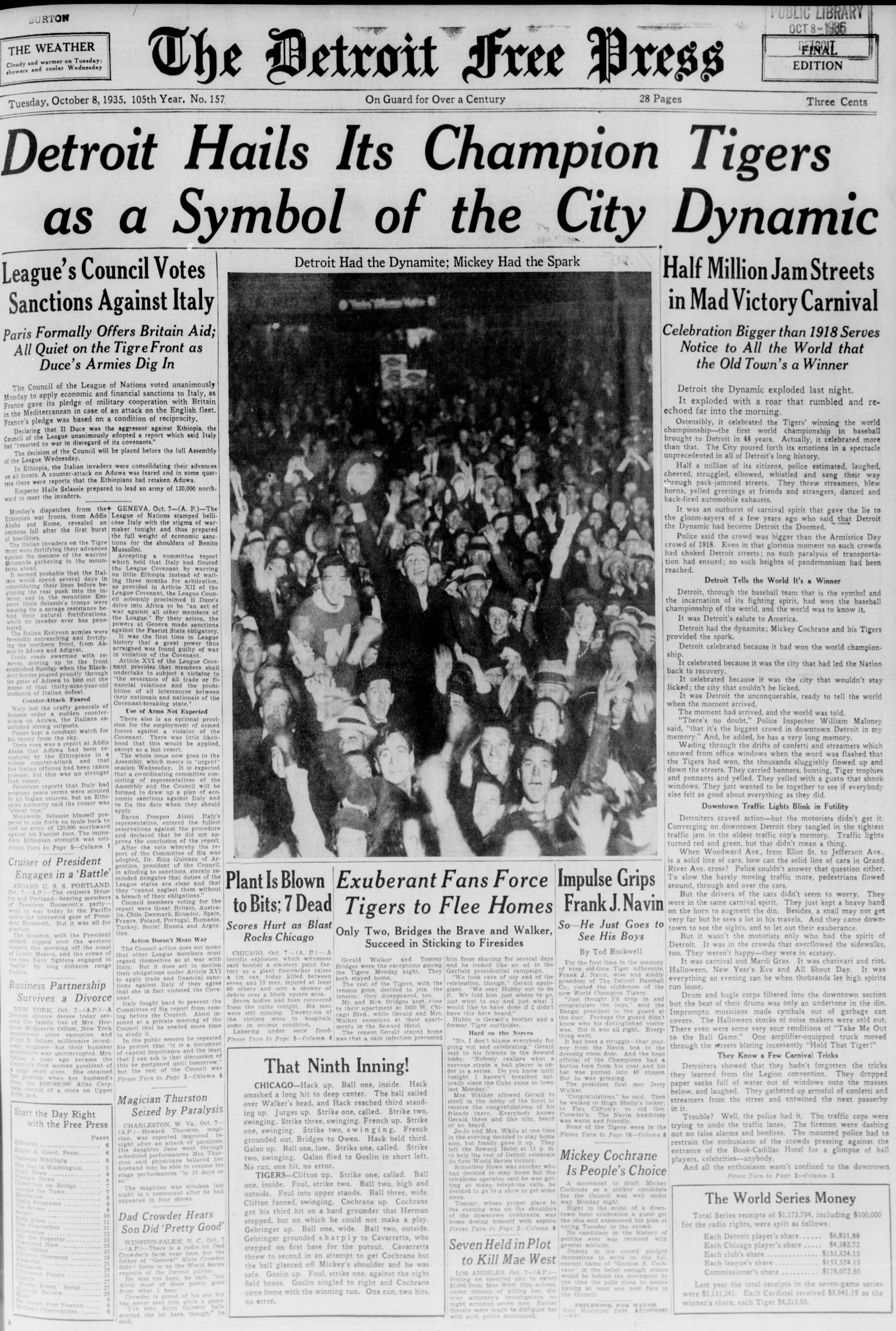
Detroit Celebrates

When the Tigers won the 1935 World Series, the City of Detroit was mired in the Great Depression, which had hit Detroit and its industries particularly hard. But with the success of the Tigers and other Detroit athletes in 1935, Detroit's luck appeared to be changing, as the city was dubbed the "City of Champions."

Detroit's "champions" included Detroit's "Brown Bomber", Joe Louis, the heavyweight boxing champion; native Detroiter Gar Wood who was the champion of unlimited powerboat racing and the first man to go 100 miles per hour on water; Eddie "the Midnight Express" Tolan, a black Detroiter who won gold medals in the 100- and 200-meter races at the 1932 Summer Olympics. The Detroit Lions also won the 1935 NFL Championship Game, and the Detroit Red Wings won the 1935–36 Stanley Cup championship, but the biggest celebration came when the Tigers won the World Series, as the "City of Champions" moniker took hold.

Baseball was hugely popular in Detroit during the Great Depression, as attendance at Navin Field in 1934 and 1935, accounted for nearly 25 percent of baseball's total paid attendance.

=== Postseason player stats ===
==== Batting ====
Note: G = Games played; AB = At bats; H = Hits; Avg. = Batting average; HR = Home runs; RBI = Runs batted in

Player	G	AB	H	Avg.	HR	RBI
Flea Clifton	4	16	0	.000	0	0
Mickey Cochrane	6	24	7	.292	0	1
Pete Fox	6	26	10	.385	0	4
Charlie Gehringer	6	24	9	.375	0	4
Goose Goslin	6	22	6	.273	0	3
Hank Greenberg	2	6	1	.167	1	2
Marv Owen	6	20	1	.050	0	1
Billy Rogell	6	24	7	.292	0	1
Gee Walker	3	4	1	.250	0	0
Jo-Jo White	5	19	5	.263	0	1

==== Pitching ====
Note: G = Games pitched; IP = Innings pitched; W = Wins; L = Losses; ERA = Earned run average; SO = Strikeouts

Player	G	IP	W	L	ERA	SO
Schoolboy Rowe	3	21	1	2	2.57	14
Tommy Bridges	2	18	2	0	2.50	9
Alvin Crowder	1	9	1	0	1.00	5
Elden Auker	1	6	0	0	3.00	1
Elon Hogsett	1	1	0	0	0.00	0

== Awards and honors ==
- Hank Greenberg, 1B, American League Most Valuable Player

1935 Major League Baseball All-Star Game

- Charlie Gehringer, 2B, Starter
- Tommy Bridges, P
- Schoolboy Rowe, P
- Mickey Cochrane, C

=== League leaders ===
- Elden Auker: American League win percentage leader (.720)
- Elden Auker: American League leader in fielding percentage at pitcher (1.000)
- Tommy Bridges: American League strikeouts leader (163)
- Tommy Bridges: American League home runs allowed leader (22)
- Charlie Gehringer: American League leader in assists at second base (489)
- Charlie Gehringer: American League leader in fielding percentage at second base (.985)
- Hank Greenberg: American League home run leader (36)
- Hank Greenberg: American League RBI leader (170)
- Hank Greenberg: American League total bases leader (389)
- Hank Greenberg: American League extra base hits leader (98)
- Hank Greenberg: American League leader in assists at first base (99)
- Elon Hogsett: American League games finished leader (30)
- Billy Rogell: American League leader in double plays at shortstop (104)
- Billy Rogell: American League leader in fielding percentage at shortstop (.971)
- Schoolboy Rowe: American League shutouts leader (6)
- Schoolboy Rowe: American League strikeout to walk ratio leader (2.06)

=== Players ranking among top 100 all time at position ===
The following members of the 1934 Detroit Tigers are among the Top 100 of all time at their position, as ranked by The New Bill James Historical Baseball Abstract in 2001:

- Mickey Cochrane: 4th best catcher of all time
- Hank Greenberg: 8th best first baseman of all time
- Charlie Gehringer: 8th best second baseman of all time
- Billy Rogell: 49th best shortstop of all time
- Goose Goslin: 16th best left fielder of all time
- Gee Walker: 92nd best left fielder of all time
- Pete Fox: 96th best right fielder of all time
- Tommy Bridges: 77th best pitcher of all time

== Farm system ==
Level	Team	League	Manager
AA	Toledo Mud Hens	American Association	Fred Haney
AA	Portland Beavers	Pacific Coast League	Buddy Ryan and Bill Cissell
A	Beaumont Exporters	Texas League	Dutch Lorbeer
B	Springfield Senators	Illinois–Indiana–Iowa League	Bob Coleman
C	Charleston Senators	Middle Atlantic League	Russ Young and Val Picinich
C	Henderson Oilers	West Dixie League	Roy Flaskamper
D	Charleroi Tigers	Pennsylvania State Association	Earl Smith
