= 1937 New York Yankees season =

Season for the Major League Baseball team the New York Yankees

1937 New York Yankees
- World Series champions American League champions
- League: American League
- Ballpark: Yankee Stadium
- City: New York City
- Record: 102–52 (.662)
- League place: 1st
- Owners: Jacob Ruppert
- General managers: Ed Barrow
- Managers: Joe McCarthy

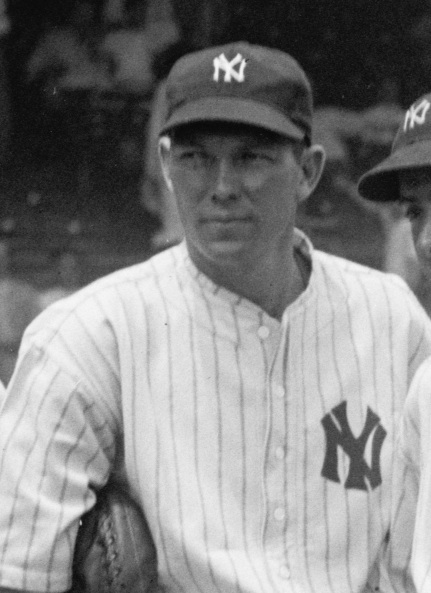
Bill Dickey of the New York Yankees, 1937

The 1937 New York Yankees season was their 35th season. The team finished with a record of 102–52, winning their 9th pennant, finishing 13 games ahead of the Detroit Tigers. New York was managed by Joe McCarthy. The Yankees played at Yankee Stadium. In the World Series, they beat the New York Giants in 5 games. This gave the Yankees a 3–2 edge in overall series play against the Giants.

1937 saw significant changes in the layout of Yankee Stadium, as concrete bleachers were built to replace the aging wooden structure, reducing the cavernous "Death Valley" of left center and center considerably, although the area remained a daunting target for right-handed power hitters such as Joe DiMaggio.

== Regular season ==
=== Season standings ===
American League
Team	W	L	Pct.	GB	Home	Road
New York Yankees	102	52	.662	—	57‍–‍20	45‍–‍32
Detroit Tigers	89	65	.578	13	49‍–‍28	40‍–‍37
Chicago White Sox	86	68	.558	16	47‍–‍30	39‍–‍38
Cleveland Indians	83	71	.539	19	50‍–‍28	33‍–‍43
Boston Red Sox	80	72	.526	21	44‍–‍29	36‍–‍43
Washington Senators	73	80	.477	28½	43‍–‍35	30‍–‍45
Philadelphia Athletics	54	97	.358	46½	27‍–‍50	27‍–‍47
St. Louis Browns	46	108	.299	56	25‍–‍51	21‍–‍57

=== Record vs. opponents ===
1937 American League record Sources:
Team	BOS	CWS	CLE	DET	NYY	PHA	SLB	WSH
Boston	—	10–12	11–11	12–10–1	7–15	17–3	15–7	8–14–1
Chicago	12–10	—	10–12	8–14	9–13	15–7	18–4	14–8
Cleveland	11–11	12–10	—	11–11	7–15–1	13–9	18–4–1	11–11
Detroit	10–12–1	14–8	11–11	—	9–13	14–8	15–7	16–6
New York	15–7	13–9	15–7–1	13–9	—	14–8	16–6–1	16–6–1
Philadelphia	3–17	7–15	9–13	8–14	8–14	—	11–11	8–13–3
St. Louis	7–15	4–18	4–18–1	7–15	6–16–1	11–11	—	7–15
Washington	14–8–1	8–14	11–11	6–16	6–16–1	13–8–3	15–7	—

=== Roster ===
1937 New York Yankees
Roster
Pitchers: 24 Ivy Andrews; 20 Johnny Broaca; 13,24,35 Spud Chandler; 11 Lefty Gomez; 14 Bump Hadley; 23,28,34 Frank Makosky; 21 Pat Malone; 19 Johnny Murphy; 16 Monte Pearson; 15 Red Ruffing; 25 Joe Vance; 20,25 Kemp Wicker	Catchers: 8 Bill Dickey; 26 Joe Glenn; 18 Arndt Jorgens; Infielders: 1 Frankie Crosetti; 4 Lou Gehrig; 10 Don Heffner; 6 Tony Lazzeri; 2 Red Rolfe; 12 Jack Saltzgaver	Outfielders: 5 Joe DiMaggio; 22,32 Tommy Henrich; 9 Myril Hoag; 22 Roy Johnson; 7 Jake Powell; 3 George Selkirk; Other batters: 28 Babe Dahlgren	Manager: -- Joe McCarthy; Coaches: 30 Earle Combs; 29 Art Fletcher; 31 Johnny Schulte

== Player stats ==
= Indicates team leader

= Indicates league leader

=== Batting ===
==== Starters by position ====
Note: Pos = Position; G = Games played; AB = At bats; H = Hits; Avg. = Batting average; HR = Home runs; RBI = Runs batted in

Pos	Player	G	AB	H	Avg.	HR	RBI
C	Bill Dickey	140	530	176	.332	29	133
1B	Lou Gehrig	157	569	200	.351	37	159
2B	Tony Lazzeri	126	446	109	.244	14	70
3B	Red Rolfe	154	648	179	.276	4	62
SS	Frankie Crosetti	149	611	143	.234	11	49
OF	Joe DiMaggio	151	621	215	.346	46	167
OF	Myril Hoag	106	362	109	.301	3	46
OF	Jake Powell	97	365	96	.263	3	45

==== Other batters ====
Note: G = Games played; AB = At bats; H = Hits; Avg. = Batting average; HR = Home runs; RBI = Runs batted in

Player	G	AB	H	Avg.	HR	RBI
George Selkirk	78	256	84	.328	18	68
Tommy Henrich	67	206	66	.320	8	42
Don Heffner	60	201	50	.259	0	21
Joe Glenn	25	53	15	.283	0	4
Roy Johnson	12	51	15	.294	0	6
Arndt Jorgens	13	23	3	.130	0	3
Jack Saltzgaver	17	11	2	.182	0	0
Babe Dahlgren	1	1	0	.000	0	0

=== Pitching ===
==== Starting pitchers ====
Note: G = Games pitched; IP = Innings pitched; W = Wins; L = Losses; ERA = Earned run average; SO = Strikeouts

Player	G	IP	W	L	ERA	SO
Lefty Gomez	34	278.1	21	11	2.33	194
Red Ruffing	31	256.1	20	7	2.98	131
Bump Hadley	29	178.1	11	8	5.30	70
Monte Pearson	22	144.2	9	3	3.17	71
Spud Chandler	12	82.1	7	4	2.84	31
Johnny Broaca	7	55.0	1	4	4.70	9
Joe Vance	2	15.0	1	0	3.00	3

==== Other pitchers ====
Note: G = Games pitched; IP = Innings pitched; W = Wins; L = Losses; ERA = Earned run average; SO = Strikeouts

Player	G	IP	W	L	ERA	SO
Pat Malone	28	92.0	4	4	5.48	49
Kemp Wicker	16	88.0	7	3	4.40	14
Ivy Andrews	11	49.0	3	2	3.12	17

==== Relief pitchers ====
Note: G = Games pitched; W = Wins; L = Losses; SV = Saves; ERA = Earned run average; SO = Strikeouts

Player	G	W	L	SV	ERA	SO
Johnny Murphy	39	13	4	10	4.17	36
Frank Makosky	26	5	2	3	4.97	27

== 1937 World Series ==
AL New York Yankees (4) vs. NL New York Giants (1)

Game	Score	Date	Location	Attendance
1	Giants – 1, Yankees – 8	October 6	Yankee Stadium	60,573
2	Giants – 1, Yankees – 8	October 7	Yankee Stadium	57,675
3	Yankees – 5, Giants – 1	October 8	Polo Grounds	37,385
4	Yankees – 3, Giants – 7	October 9	Polo Grounds	44,293
5	Yankees – 5, Giants – 2	October 10	Polo Grounds	38,216

== Farm system ==
Level	Team	League	Manager
AA	Kansas City Blues	American Association	Dutch Zwilling
AA	Newark Bears	International League	Ossie Vitt
AA	Oakland Oaks	Pacific Coast League	Billy Meyer
A	Binghamton Triplets	New York–Pennsylvania League	Bill Skiff
B	Norfolk Tars	Piedmont League	Johnny Neun
B	Augusta Tigers	Sally League	Jack Mealey and Troy Agnew
B	Jackson Mississippians	Southeastern League	Ike Boone and Jack Mealey
C	Smiths Falls Beavers	Canadian–American League	Johnny Haddock
C	Akron Yankees	Middle Atlantic League	Leo Mackey
C	Joplin Miners	Western Association	Benny Bengough
D	Rogers Lions	Arkansas–Missouri League	Ted Mayer
D	Bassett Furniture Makers	Bi-State League	Ray White
D	Snow Hill Billies	Coastal Plain League	Dwight Wall and Peahead Walker
D	Norfolk Elks	Nebraska State League	Doc Bennett
D	Butler Yankees	Pennsylvania State Association	Lefty Jenkins

LEAGUE CHAMPIONS: Newark, Norfolk (Piedmont), Rogers, Bassett, Snow Hill, Butler
