= George Gill (pitcher) =

American baseball player (1909–1999)

- Pitcher
- Born: February 13, 1909; Catchings, Mississippi, U.S.
- Died: February 21, 1999 (aged 90); Jackson, Mississippi, U.S.
- Batted: Right Threw: Right

MLB debut
- May 4, 1937, for the Detroit Tigers

Last MLB appearance
- September 27, 1939, for the St. Louis Browns

MLB statistics
- Win–loss record: 24–26
- Strikeouts: 95
- Earned run average: 5.05
- Stats at Baseball Reference

Teams
- Detroit Tigers (1937–1939); St. Louis Browns (1939)

George Lloyd Gill (February 13, 1909 – February 21, 1999) was an American professional baseball pitcher. He played three seasons in Major League Baseball, for the Detroit Tigers from 1937 to 1939 and for the St. Louis Browns in 1939.

Born in Catchings, Mississippi, Gill went to Mississippi College before making his debut with the Tigers at age 28 on May 4, 1937. On May 30, 1937, led by fellow Mississippian Gee Walker‚ the Tigers collected 20 hits in an 18–3 victory for Gill. In his rookie season, the right-handed throwing Gill went 11–4 in 31 games (10 as a starter). His 1937 record ranked 5th in the American League in winning percentage (.733). He was also 7th in the league in games finished with 18.

Gill had another winning season for the Tigers in 1938, this time as a starter in 23 games. He had 13 complete games in 1938 and finished with a 12–9 record. Gill was traded to the Browns in May 1939 in an 11-player deal that brought Bobo Newsom to the Tigers. Newsom won 17 games for the Tigers in 1939, while Gill never pitched well for the Browns, compiling a 1–12 record for the worst team in Browns' history. He pitched his last big league game on September 27, 1939.

After his playing career ended, Gill lived in Raymond, Mississippi, where he owned a cattle and poultry business. He died in Jackson, Mississippi, at age 90.
