= Jo-Jo White =

American baseball player, coach, and manager (1909–1986)

- Outfielder / Manager
- Born: June 1, 1909; Red Oak, Georgia, U.S.
- Died: October 9, 1986 (aged 77); Tacoma, Washington, U.S.
- Batted: Left Threw: Right

MLB debut
- April 15, 1932, for the Detroit Tigers

Last MLB appearance
- September 30, 1944, for the Cincinnati Reds

MLB statistics
- Batting average: .256
- Home runs: 8
- Runs batted in: 229
- Stats at Baseball Reference

Teams
- As a player: Detroit Tigers (1932–1938); Philadelphia Athletics (1943–1944); Cincinnati Reds (1944); As a manager: Cleveland Indians (1960); As a coach: Cleveland Indians (1959–1960); Detroit Tigers (1960); Kansas City Athletics (1961–1962); Milwaukee/Atlanta Braves (1963–1966); Kansas City Royals (1969)

Career highlights and awards
- World Series champion (1935)

Joyner Clifford "Jo-Jo" White (June 1, 1909 – October 9, 1986) was an American baseball center fielder. He played nine seasons in Major League Baseball with the Detroit Tigers (1932–38), Philadelphia Athletics (1943–44) and Cincinnati Reds (1944). He was the center fielder of the 1934 and 1935 Detroit teams that won back-to-back American League pennants. White had his best major league season in 1934, batting .313 with a .419 on-base percentage, 97 runs, 69 bases on balls, and 28 stolen bases.

White also played nine seasons in the Pacific Coast League (PCL) for the Seattle Rainiers (1939-1942, 1946-1948), Sacramento Solons (1945-1946), and Hollywood Stars (1949). His best season in the PCL was 1945 when he compiled a .355 batting average and a .442 on-base percentage with 244 hits, 162 runs, 97 bases on balls, 87 RBIs, 57 extra-base hits, and 40 stolen bases.

After his playing career ended, White worked as a scout, minor league manager and major league coach, serving on the staffs of the Cleveland Indians (1958–60), Detroit Tigers (1960), Kansas City Athletics (1961–62), Milwaukee/Atlanta Braves (1963–66), and Kansas City Royals (1969).

== Early life ==
White was born in Red Oak, Georgia, in 1909. His family moved to College Park, Georgia, on the south side of Atlanta, when White was an infant. He attended Tech High School in Atlanta. His high school baseball coach Gabe Tolbert said of him: "He was one of the best baseball players we ever had at Tech High, and also did some good work at forward on the basketball team."

White reportedly earned the nickname "Jo-Jo" because of the way he pronounced the name of his home state, Georgia.

== Professional baseball player ==
=== Minor leagues ===
White began his playing career in minor league baseball in 1928 with the Carrollton Frogs of the Georgia-Alabama League. He compiled a .330 batting average and a .635 slugging percentage for Carrollton. He led the Georgia-Alabama League with 28 home runs.

In 1929, White played for Fort Smith of the Western Association, compiling a .312 batting average, .530 slugging percentage in 137 games. By the end of July he was leading all the minor leagues with 42 stolen bases.

White began the 1930 season with Evansville of the Triple-I league, his batting average dropping to .188 in 20 games. Hereturned to Fort Smith, batting .316 with a .587 slugging percentage, 19 triples, and 22 home runs in 112 games.

In 1931, White was promoted to the Beaumont Exporters of the Texas League. In 161 games, he batted .298 with 34 doubles and 52 stolen bases, and led the league with 23 triples.

=== Detroit Tigers ===
==== 1932 and 1933 seasons ====
In 1932, White joined the Detroit Tigers, making his major league debut on April 15. He quickly won a reputation as "the fastest man in the League on the basepaths." In his first game, he broke up a double play by cutting down the second baseman, allowing the winning run to score and drawing comparison to the Tigers' prior Georgia-born center fielder, Ty Cobb. He played all three outfield positions during the 1932 season: 17 in center field and 16 each in right field and center field. He compiled a .260 batting average and a .346 slugging percentage.

In 1932, he played 32 games in center field, 16 in left field, and six in right field. His batting average was .252 with a .359 slugging percentage. He was married to Ferne Rodenburgh of Arkansas in June 1933 at Detroit's Wolverines Hotel. White's teammates Gee Walker, Marv Owen, and Schoolboy Rowe attended the ceremony.

==== 1934 and 1935 seasons ====
In 1934, White became an everyday player for the Tigers, playing 92 games in center field, seven in right field, and one in left field. He tallied career highs with a .313 batting average, a .419 on-base percentage, 97 runs scored, 28 stolen bases (second most in the American League), 43 RBIs, and 69 bases on balls.

The Tigers won the American League pennant in 1934 with a 101-53 record. White played in all seven games of the 1934 World Series, walking eight times and scoring six runs against the Gashouse Gang St. Louis Cardinals, who beat Detroit in seven games.

In 1935, White's batting average dropped 73 points to .240, but he still scored 82 runs and was among the AL leaders with 12 triples and 19 stolen bases. He played in five games of the 1935 World Series, scoring three runs with a .417 on-base percentage. White also hit a single in the 11th inning of Game 3 to drive in Marv Owen for the win, contributing to the Tigers' first-ever world championship, as they defeated the Chicago Cubs in six games.

White was roommates with Detroit slugger Hank Greenberg for five years. In his autobiography, Greenberg wrote that they had a great relationship and enjoyed being on the road together, though they "used to fight the Civil War every night." Greenberg noted that "no two people could be more different than me, coming from the Bronx, and Jo-Jo White, claiming he came from Atlanta." White even confessed once to Greenberg, "I thought all you Jews had horns on your head."

==== 1936 to 1938 seasons ====
In 1936, White lost the starting job in center field and remained a backup with the Tigers from 1936 to 1938. After playing in only 55 games in the outfield in 1938, White was frustrated with his limited playing time. After "a drink or two" on a train ride late in the 1938 season, White "decided to attack" a brand new felt hat purchased by manager Del Baker. Baker finally found out that it was White who had deliberately ruined the hat, and White was traded to the Seattle Rainiers of the Pacific Coast League on December 12 as part payment for young pitcher Fred Hutchinson.

=== Seattle: 1939-1942 ===
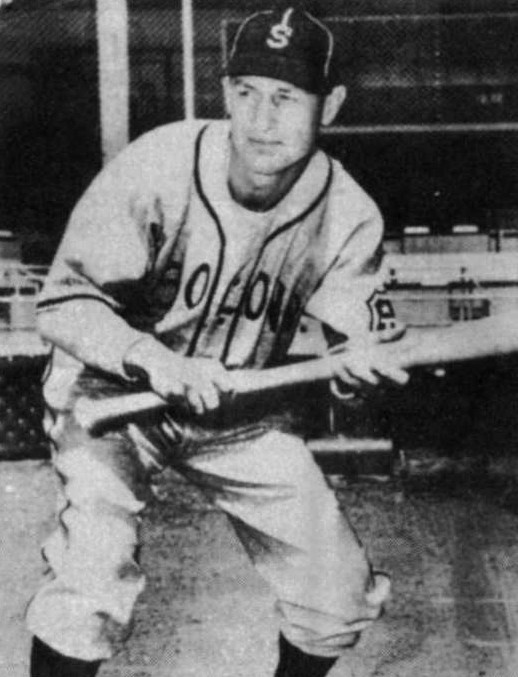
White in 1946 as a member of the Sacramento Solons of the PCL.

White played for Seattle for four full seasons (1939–42), helping them win the PCL pennant in both 1940 and 1941.

=== Philadelphia and Cincinnati (1943-1944) ===
White returned to the Major Leagues during World War II, following the depletion of the talent pool as top players went into military service. In 1943, he was acquired by the Philadelphia Athletics and played in more games (139) and had more at bats (500) and hits (124) than any other season in his MLB career. After playing 85 games for the A's in 1944, he was traded to the Cincinnati Reds in August, finishing his career by playing 24 games for the Reds. In nine MLB seasons, he had a lifetime batting average of .256 in 878 games, with 678 hits, 456 runs scored, 386 walks, 42 triples, and 92 stolen bases.

=== Pacific Coast League (1945-1949) ===
White's playing career did not end in 1944, however. In 1945, he returned to the Pacific Coast League, and he had his finest pro season at age 36: 244 hits, 162 runs scored and a .355 batting average (all leading the PCL) while playing for the Sacramento Solons. The following year, Sacramento sent White back to the Seattle Rainiers, where he made his managerial debut as a playing skipper late in the 1946 campaign. White also managed the Rainiers from 1947 through mid-1949, leading them to the 1948 playoffs. After his release in Seattle in 1949, he concluded his active career as a player only for the PCL Hollywood Stars, appearing in 31 games.

== Coach and interim manager ==
He then had a long career as a scout, minor league manager and MLB coach, serving on the staffs of the Cleveland Indians (1958–60), Detroit Tigers (1960), Kansas City Athletics (1961–62), Milwaukee/Atlanta Braves (1963–66), and Kansas City Royals (1969), usually as third base coach. He was a longtime associate of manager Joe Gordon, working with him with the Indians, Tigers, Athletics and Royals.

Indeed, as a coach under Gordon, White was involved in the bizarre trade of managers between the Indians and Tigers on August 3, 1960. That day, the Indians' Gordon was swapped even-up for Tigers' manager Jimmy Dykes. As the two pilots prepared to change teams, Cleveland needed an interim manager and tabbed White to handle the Indians for their night game with the Washington Senators at Griffith Stadium. In White's only MLB game managed, he oversaw a 7–4 Indians' win. Mudcat Grant hurled a complete game, supported by second baseman Ken Aspromonte's home run and three runs batted in. Four days later, it was announced that White also "traded" teams—leaving the Indians to rejoin Gordon with Detroit, while Tigers' coach Luke Appling simultaneously quit his post to rejoin Dykes with the Indians.

White moved to Tacoma, Washington, in 1977. He died from complications from a heart bypass operation at age 77 in Tacoma.

White was inducted posthumously into the Georgia Sports Hall of Fame in 1997.

White had a daughter Tonya Jo (born 1934), a son, Joyner Michael White (born 1938), who was a center fielder and second baseman for the Houston Colt .45s/Astros from 1963 to 1965.

=== Managerial record ===
Team	Year	Regular season					Postseason			
Team	Year	Games	Won	Lost	Win %	Finish	Won	Lost	Win %	Result
CLE	1960	1	1	0	1.000	interim	–	–	–	–
Total		1	1	0	1.000		0	0	–	

== See also ==
- 1935 Detroit Tigers season

Sporting positions
Preceded by Jimmy Dykes	Milwaukee/Atlanta Braves third-base coach 1963–1966	Succeeded by Bill Adair
Preceded by Franchise established	Kansas City Royals third-base coach 1969	Succeeded by Joe Schultz
