= Alvin Crowder =

American baseball player (1899–1972)

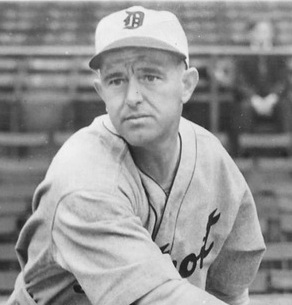
- Crowder, circa 1935
- Pitcher
- Born: January 11, 1899; Winston-Salem, North Carolina, U.S.
- Died: April 3, 1972 (aged 73); Winston-Salem, North Carolina, U.S.
- Batted: Left Threw: Right

MLB debut
- July 24, 1926, for the Washington Senators

Last MLB appearance
- June 26, 1936, for the Detroit Tigers

MLB statistics
- Win–loss record: 167–115
- Earned run average: 4.12
- Strikeouts: 799
- Stats at Baseball Reference

Teams
- Washington Senators (1926–1927); St. Louis Browns (1927–1930); Washington Senators (1930–1934); Detroit Tigers (1934–1936)

Career highlights and awards
- All-Star (1933); World Series champion (1935); 2× AL wins leader (1932, 1933)

Alvin Floyd Crowder (January 11, 1899 – April 3, 1972), nicknamed "General", was an American right-handed pitcher in Major League Baseball who played eleven seasons in the American League with the Washington Senators, the St. Louis Browns, and the Detroit Tigers. In 402 career games, Crowder pitched 2344 1/3 innings and posted a win–loss record of 167–115, with 150 complete games, 16 shutouts, and a 4.12 earned run average.

== Early life ==
Born in Winston-Salem, North Carolina, Crowder served almost three years in the army during World War I, including assignments in the Philippines and 11 months with the American Expeditionary Force in Siberia. However, he never reached the rank of "General." His nickname, "General" Crowder, came from General Enoch Crowder, who designed the World War I draft lottery in the United States.

Crowder learned to play baseball when he was a private in the Army. He had been shipped from Siberia to the Philippines and back again before a Pacific Coast League scout offered him a job.

== Career ==
Although Crowder signed his first baseball contract in 1920, he did not play a full season until 1923, with the Winston-Salem Twins. He did not appear in his first major league game until the age of 27, in 1926. Crowder won only seven games in each of his first two seasons, but finished the 1928 season with a record of 21–5 for the Browns. His .808 win percentage was the best in the American League, and his 21 wins finished fourth best in the league.

Crowder won 20 games in three different seasons, including a 26–13 record in 1932, the most wins in the American League. In that same season, Crowder set the record, which he still holds, for the most innings pitched in a season without hitting a batter, with 327. In 1933, Crowder won 24 games, again the most in the AL, helped the Senators win the pennant, pitched in the first Major League Baseball All-Star Game, and finished 7th in the American League Most Valuable Player voting.

The Detroit Tigers selected Crowder off waivers on August 3, 1934. He went 5–1 for the Tigers down the stretch, helping them win their first pennant in 25 years. Crowder faced the Yankees in two series late in the 1934 season, winning the opening game in both. Those two victories helped the Tigers overtake the Yankees for the American League pennant. In the 1934 World Series against the St. Louis Cardinals, he lost Game 1 to Dizzy Dean.

In 1935, Crowder went 16–10 for the Tigers as the club won its second consecutive American League pennant. He pitched a complete game in Game 4 of the 1935 World Series for a 2–1 victory to help the Tigers win their first World Series championship. Crowder pitched in three World Series consecutively (1933–1935), posting a record of 1–2 with a 3.81 earned run average in 26 innings pitched.

Crowder was also known as "Yankee Killer", for his success against the Yankees generally and Babe Ruth in particular.

In his career, Crowder had a 167–115 record with a 4.12 earned run average.

Crowder was a good fielding pitcher in his career, recording a .984 fielding percentage, making only seven errors in 450 total chances. After making an error against the New York Yankees on May 19, 1932, he went the rest of his career without making another, covering 209 games pitched and handling 179 total chances without a miscue. As a hitter, he went 164–847, for a .194 batting average with 66 runs scored and 60 runs batted in but did not hit any home runs.

== Post-baseball ==
After his playing career ended, Crowder returned to Winston-Salem where he operated the Winston-Salem Twins during the late 1930s and early 1940s.

In 1967, Crowder was named to North Carolina's Sports Hall of Fame.

Crowder died in 1972 at the age of 73 in Winston-Salem.

== See also ==
- 1935 Detroit Tigers season
- List of Major League Baseball annual wins leaders
