= Frank Makosky =

American baseball player (1910-1987)

- Pitcher
- Born: January 20, 1910; Boonton, New Jersey, U.S.
- Died: January 10, 1987 (aged 76); Stroudsburg, Pennsylvania, U.S.
- Batted: Right Threw: Right

MLB debut
- April 30, 1937, for the New York Yankees

Last MLB appearance
- September 30, 1937, for the New York Yankees

MLB statistics
- Win–loss record: 5–2
- Earned run average: 4.97
- Strikeouts: 27
- Stats at Baseball Reference

Teams
- New York Yankees (1937)

Frank Makosky (January 20, 1910 – January 10, 1987) was a Major League Baseball pitcher. Makosky played for the New York Yankees in 1937. In 26 career games, he had a 5–2 record, with a 4.97 ERA. He batted and threw right-handed.

Born and raised in Boonton, New Jersey, Makosky attended Boonton High School, where he earned varsity letters in baseball, basketball and football, as well as track. He played for the school's baseball team (with James P. Vreeland as a teammate) which had an undefeated season in 1927. A graduate of the class of 1930, he was inducted into the school's Hall of Fame in 1996.

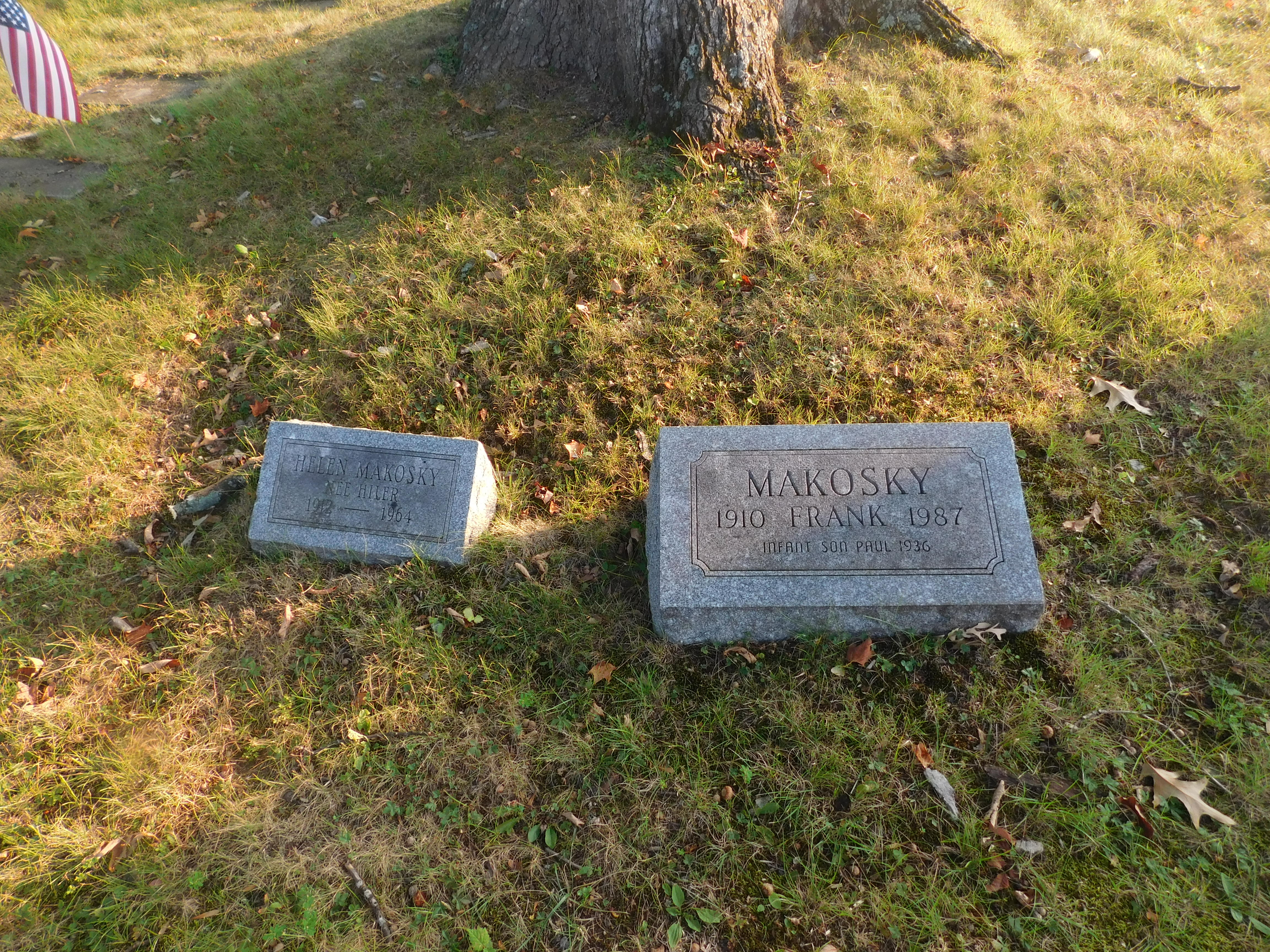
The grave of Makosky, his wife, Helen, and his infant son, Paul at Greenwood Cemetery in Boonton

Makosky died in Stroudsburg, Pennsylvania.
