= Frank Reiber =

American baseball player (1909–2002)

- Catcher
- Born: September 19, 1909; Huntington, West Virginia
- Died: December 26, 2002 (aged 93); Bradenton, Florida
- Batted: Right Threw: Right

MLB debut
- April 13, 1933, for the Detroit Tigers

Last MLB appearance
- September 27, 1936, for the Detroit Tigers

MLB statistics
- Batting average: .271
- Home runs: 2
- Runs batted in: 9
- Stats at Baseball Reference

Teams
- Detroit Tigers (1933–1936)

Career highlights and awards
- World Series champion (1935)

Frank Bernard Reiber (September 19, 1909 – December 26, 2002), nicknamed "Tubby," was an American baseball catcher. He played in Major League Baseball for the Detroit Tigers in 1933, 1935 and 1936. He also played 11 years in the minor leagues, including stints with the Evansville Hubs (1930–1931), Beaumont Exporters (1932), Toledo Mud Hens (1933, 1937), Montreal Royals (1934, 1936), Toronto Maple Leafs (1938–1939), and Portland Beavers (1940–1941).

== Early years ==
Reiber was born in Huntington, West Virginia, in 1909. He moved to Detroit as a boy and attended Detroit Central High School.

== Professional baseball ==
Reiber played for the Detroit Tigers in 1933, 1935, and 1936, appearing in 44 major league games. He compiled a .271 batting average with 23 hits, 13 runs scored, two doubles, one triple, and two home runs. Reiber was a backup catcher with the 1935 Detroit Tigers team that won the 1935 World Series.

He also played 11 years in the minor leagues, including stints with the Fort Smith Twins (1930), Evansville Hubs (1930–1931), Beaumont Exporters (1932), Toledo Mud Hens (1933, 1937), Montreal Royals (1934, 1936), Toronto Maple Leafs (1938–1939), and Portland Beavers (1940–1941).

== Later years ==
Reiver died in 2002 in Bradenton, Florida, at age 93.
