= Billy Rogell =

American baseball player (1904–2003)

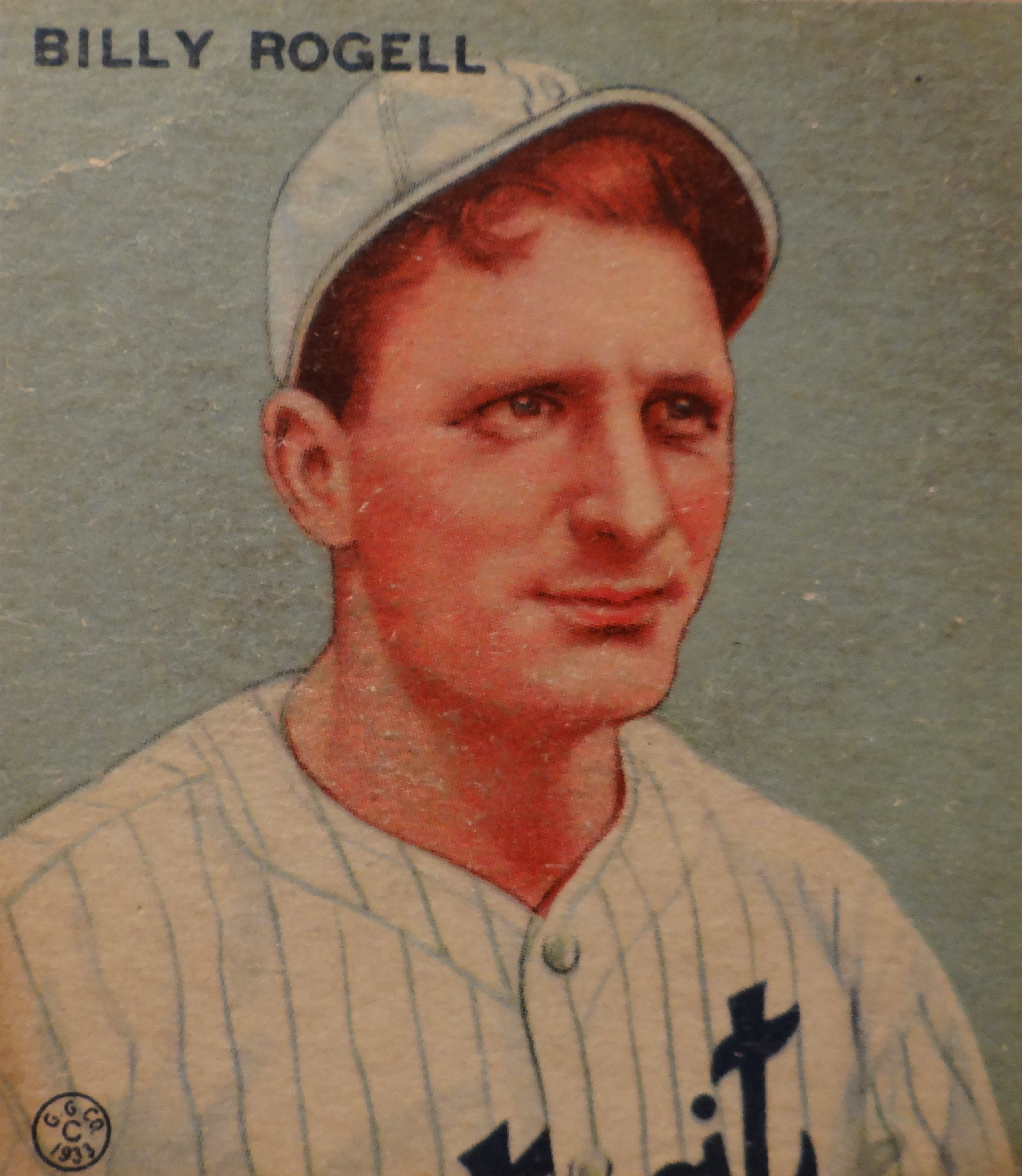
- Shortstop
- Born: November 24, 1904; Springfield, Illinois, U.S.
- Died: August 9, 2003 (aged 98); Sterling Heights, Michigan, U.S.
- Batted: Right Threw: Right

MLB debut
- April 14, 1925, for the Boston Red Sox

Last MLB appearance
- August 25, 1940, for the Chicago Cubs

MLB statistics
- Batting average: .267
- Home runs: 42
- Runs batted in: 610
- Stats at Baseball Reference

Teams
- Boston Red Sox (1925, 1927–1928); Detroit Tigers (1930–1939); Chicago Cubs (1940)

Career highlights and awards
- World Series champion (1935)

William George Rogell (/roʊɡɛl/; November 24, 1904 – August 9, 2003) was an American professional baseball player who played 14 years in Major League Baseball, primarily as a shortstop for the Detroit Tigers. He made his major league debut on April 14, 1925 and played his last game August 25, 1940. After his playing career, he spent 36 years as a member of the Detroit City Council.

== Playing career ==
=== Early career ===
Born in Springfield, Illinois, Rogell was originally signed by the Boston Red Sox prior to the 1925 campaign after two seasons in the Southwestern League. The Red Sox quickly tried to convert the switch-hitting Rogell into solely a right-handed batter, thinking that he would benefit from more appearances from the right side, hence more chances to drive balls off the Green Monster. "They just screwed me up for a couple years," Rogell would say later.

He appeared in 58 games for the last-place Red Sox—49 at second base—while hitting .195 in 169 at-bats. He was sent back to the minors for more grooming during the 1926 season before being recalled by Boston for 1927.

Rogell played in 82 games, hitting .266 while splitting time between third and second. The Red Sox again finished in the cellar, losing 100 games for the third year in a row.

During the 1928 season he appeared in games at short, third, second, as well as all three outfield positions, and the Red Sox released him at the conclusion of the season.

Rogell played 1929 for the St. Paul Saints of the American Association, batting .336 and driving in 90 runs. Following the season, amid offers from a handful of teams, Rogell signed with the Detroit Tigers, where he would spend the next ten seasons.

=== The Tigers Years ===
==== Building a contender ====
Rogell struggled out of the gate and the club acquired shortstop Mark Koenig from the Yankees mid-season and plugged him into the lineup. Koenig, the same age as Rogell but already a household name, had been an integral part of the Yankees' famed Murderers' Row lineup in 1927 and was still considered by many as one of the premier shortstops in the American League. Rogell finished the year with a .167 average in 54 games, splitting his time between short and third.

Though his start in Detroit was unimpressive, by the time the 1931 season had ended it was clear to the Tigers that they had found their shortstop of the future. Rogell unseated Koenig late in the year and finished the year hitting .303 in 48 games, all at shortstop. Koenig was released after the season ended.

Rogell was the Tigers' Opening Day shortstop for the 1932 season, a position he would hold for the next eight years. A sure-handed fielder, he and Hall of Fame double-play partner Charlie Gehringer would give the Tigers one of the best keystone-combinations in baseball history. Marv Owen, who would man the left side of the Detroit infield with Rogell for five years, said of Rogell's fielding prowess, "He's the only player I ever knew who could catch a bad hop… I don't know how he did it."

Rogell's offense continued to show the promise it had with the St. Paul club. He hit .271 with 29 doubles and 88 runs scored during the '32 campaign, and improved the following year to .295, 44 doubles, 11 triples, and drew 79 walks to post a .381 on-base percentage while playing in every game. The 1933 season also marked the first time Rogell, Gehringer, Owen, and first baseman Hank Greenberg appeared in the same lineup.

==== The Tigers break through ====
The Tigers, perennial second division finishers, acquired catcher/manager Mickey Cochrane from the Philadelphia A's during the winter. With him in place, the Tigers entered the 1934 season poised to take the American League by storm. Rogell, leading off in front of four future Hall of Famers (Cochrane, Gehringer, Greenberg, as well as Goose Goslin), had the best season of his career, hitting .296, driving in a career-best 99 runs and scoring 114. Rogell was part of a prolific offensive infield that combined for a major league record 462 runs batted in. The Tigers won the American League pennant (their first pennant since 1909) by seven games and were set to square off against the St. Louis Cardinals in the World Series.

Rogell, unbeknownst to the Cardinals or the media, played the series on a broken ankle. Despite the injury, he was able to collect eight hits and drive in four runs over the seven game series. He also found his way into one of the most memorable plays in World Series history.

==== The Dizzy Dean Incident ====
After driving in a run with a single to right in the fourth inning of game four, Spud Davis was replaced by Hall of Famer Dizzy Dean as a pinch runner at first base. Pepper Martin then stepped in and hit a ground ball to Gehringer at second. Gehringer turned and threw to Rogell, who forced out Dean at second, and then fired the ball squarely into Dean's forehead on the relay throw to first. The ball ricocheted off Dean's head and landed over a hundred feet away in the outfield. Dean, always known for his quick wit and humorous nature, remarked after a visit to the hospital, "The doctors X-rayed my head and found nothing." Rogell would say of the play later, "If I'd have known his head was there, I would have thrown the ball harder."

==== World Series Champion ====
After losing in seven games to the Cardinals, the Tigers returned to the series the following season. Again led by their stellar infield, the Tigers won the pennant by three games over the Yankees and earned a trip to face the Chicago Cubs for the World's championship. Rogell finished with another solid year at the bat, hitting .275 with 88 runs scored while drawing 80 walks.

Although he had shown speed in the minors, Rogell rarely had a chance to move on the bases with Detroit. "They didn't want me to steal," he would say after retiring. "I had Gehringer and Cochrane and Greenberg hitting behind me."

Even with American League MVP Greenberg out for much of the series, the Tigers finished off the Cubs in six games to claim the franchise's first ever World Series crown. Rogell had another good showing in the fall classic, batting .292.

=== The end in Detroit and a year in Chicago ===
Although continuing to post winning records through the rest of the decade, the Tigers could not bring home another pennant as the Joe DiMaggio-led Yankees began their ascendancy from perennial contenders to a baseball dynasty by winning four straight World titles and six in 8 years.

Rogell, after two more solid seasons at the bat, began to slip during the 1938 campaign. He did, however, set a Major League record on August 19 of that year when he was walked in seven consecutive plate appearances (a record tied by three other players since, but never eclipsed). Rogell accomplished the feat over a three-game span.

He injured his arm after the season playing handball, and by the close of the 1939 season he had been replaced by 24-year-old Frank Croucher at short. Rogell was traded to the Cubs during the winter for shortstop Dick Bartell. The deal was described in the papers as being a trade of "one worn-out shortstop for another."

While Bartell would be a key part of the 1940 pennant winning Tiger club, Rogell entered a hornets' nest the moment he set foot into the Cubs' spring training camp. Holdovers from the 1935 team still held resentment toward Rogell and his Tiger teammates. Rogell, defending his former mates, got into a posturing match with manager/catcher Gabby Hartnett, who finally shouted, "You don't belong here!" Rogell immediately asked for his release, which the Cubs refused. He spent the year riding the bench, as the Cubs rode their way into the second division of the National League, and retired at the conclusion of the season. Rogell appeared in only 33 games, collecting just eight hits.

=== Rogell and Gehringer ===
Rogell led American League shortstops in fielding percentage in 1935, '36, and '37. He also led the league once in both putouts and assists, and twice paired with Gehringer to lead the league in double plays. The two played over 1000 games together, making them one of the longest tenured double-play combinations in the history of the game.

A fiery competitor, Rogell provided an intriguing foil to "The Mechanical Man" throughout their careers. Gehringer recalled in his Hall of Fame induction speech, "I wasn't a rabble rouser. I wasn't a big noisemaker in the infield, which a lot of managers think you've got to be or you're not showing. But I don't think it contributes much."

Rogell, however, did not employ Gehringer's ideals when it came to on-field dialogue. On one occasion, after both failing to cover second on a steal attempt, Cochrane charged out from behind the plate shouting at Rogell and Gehringer. From The New Bill James Historical Baseball Abstract:

Rogell, astonished, looked at Gehringer to see if he was going to say anything. Gehringer, of course, had nothing to say. "Goddamn you," yelled Rogell. "Don’t you come charging out here telling me how to play shortstop. You go back there and do the catching, and I’ll play shortstop. If I’m not good enough, you can find someone else." Cochrane went back to his own position.

== Retirement from baseball ==
Rogell spent the bulk of his "retirement" as a member of the Detroit City Council. After a brief stint in the minors as a player and coach, he returned to Detroit and began his civil service career in 1942. He would serve on the council, with a two-year break in the late forties, until 1980, playing a key role on the city's planning commissions. "I think I did a lot for that city," he would say after leaving his post. "I was chairman of the committee that built the big airport there. Also the roads and bridges committee." The road entering Detroit's Metropolitan Airport from the north, Merriman Road, changed its name to William G. Rogell Drive as it enters the airport.

Rogell also used his position to help old ballplayers in the Detroit area. Former Tiger teammate Tommy Bridges (who came to the Tigers the same year as Rogell), a sober man throughout his career, started to drink while serving in World War II. After trying to restart his career with Tigers following the war Bridges moved on to the Pacific Coast League. His drinking became more and more prevalent until he finally collapsed drunk on the mound during a game. He divorced his wife, married a waitress from a bar he often visited, moved back to Detroit, and caught up with some of his old teammates.

Rogell, upset with the condition his former mate was in, lined up for Bridges a sales job in Detroit. Bridges never came to work, but Rogell did not hold any kind of resentment toward Bridges. "It was terrible to see that," he said. "But nice guys go, too, you know."

Numerous other former players also turned to Rogell when they had run out of options, and he always worked hard to try to provide them with whatever assistance he could.

Rogell, after leaving the council, spent the rest of his retirement in Detroit. At age 94 he threw out the first pitch at the final game at Tiger Stadium on September 27, 1999, nearly 70 years after he had debuted for the Tigers in the same park.

Billy Rogell died of pneumonia at the age of 98 in the Detroit suburb of Sterling Heights.

== See also ==
- 1935 Detroit Tigers season
