= Ray Hayworth =

American baseball player and coach (1904–2002)

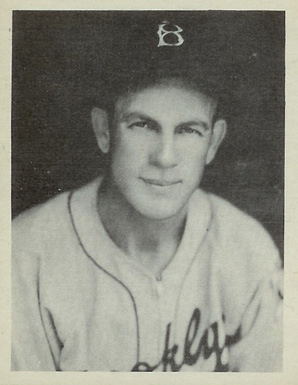
- Catcher
- Born: January 29, 1904; High Point, North Carolina, U.S.
- Died: September 25, 2002 (aged 98); Salisbury, North Carolina, U.S.
- Batted: Right Threw: Right

MLB debut
- June 27, 1926, for the Detroit Tigers

Last MLB appearance
- June 18, 1945, for the Brooklyn Dodgers

MLB statistics
- Batting average: .265
- Home runs: 5
- Runs batted in: 238
- Stats at Baseball Reference

Teams
- Detroit Tigers (1926, 1929–1938); Brooklyn Dodgers (1938–1939); New York Giants (1939); St. Louis Browns (1942); Brooklyn Dodgers (1944–1945)

Career highlights and awards
- World Series champion (1935)

Raymond Hall Hayworth (January 29, 1904 – September 25, 2002) was an American professional baseball player, manager and scout. He played as a catcher in Major League Baseball between 1926 and 1945, most notably as a member of the Detroit Tigers team that won two consecutive American League pennants in 1934 and 1935 and won the 1935 World Series. He was employed in professional baseball for nearly 50 years from 1926 to 1973.

A native of High Point, North Carolina, Hayworth played professional baseball for 15 seasons in Major League Baseball with the Detroit Tigers (1929–1938), Brooklyn Dodgers (1939, 1944–1945), New York Giants (1939), and St. Louis Browns (1942). He posted a .265 career batting average with five home runs and 238 RBIs in 699 games played. A strong defensive catcher, he set an American League record by handling 438 consecutive total chances as a catcher without an error.

Following his playing career, Hayworth managed the Fort Worth Cats in 1946 and Macon Peaches in 1947. He also scouted the Negro leagues for Branch Rickey and the Brooklyn Dodgers in 1946 and then continued scouting for more than 25 years for the Chicago Cubs (1947–1959), the Milwaukee / Atlanta Braves (1960–1970), and the Montreal Expos (1971–1973).

== Early years ==
Hayworth was born in 1904 in High Point, North Carolina. He grew up as one of nine children in a Quaker family raised in a Quaker settlement south of High Point. His father had a tobacco and cotton farm and operated a store. He began playing baseball in grade school. He and three of his brothers played baseball. His brother Red Hayworth also played in the major leagues. Hayworth was a pitcher and began playing catcher at the Oak Ridge Military Academy in Oak Ridge, North Carolina.

== Professional baseball ==
=== Detroit Tigers ===
In January 1926, Hayworth was discovered at Oak Ridge by Detroit Tigers' scout Billy Doyle. Doyle signed Hayworth for $250. He began the 1926 season with the Toronto Maple Leafs of the International League, but he was called up when Johnny Bassler broke his leg and then Larry Woodall was also injured with a spike wound in his knee. He ended up playing 12 games for the 1926 Tigers, compiling a .233 batting average. Ty Cobb was Hayworth's manager in 1926.

He spent the 1927 and 1928 seasons in the minor leagues, playing for the Nashville Volunteers of the Southern Association and the Shreveport Sports of the Texas League. He hit a career-high 13 home runs with Shreveport in 1928.

He began the 1929 season with the Toledo Mud Hens of the American Association where he played 73 games and hit for a career-high .330 batting average under manager Casey Stengel. Hayworth later recalled that Stengel influenced him more than anyone else.

Hayworth was recalled by the Tigers later in the 1929 season and appeared in 14 games, hitting for a .256 average. He remained with the Tigers for nearly a decade through the start of the 1938 season. He received significant playing time with 77 games 1930, 88 games in 1931, 109 games in 1932, and 134 games in 1933.

Hayworth led the American League with 11 passed balls in 1930, but he quickly established himself as one of the best defensive catchers in the American League from 1931 to 1933. He set an American League record for the most consecutive chances by a catcher without an error at 439, over a span of 97 games from September 2, 1931, to August 29, 1932. The previous record was set by Johnny Bassler with 285 chances. In 1932, Hayworth hit .293 and ranked among the league's top catchers with a .991 fielding percentage (second), 59 assists (third), a 4.99 range factor per nine innings (third), 399 putouts (fourth), 31 runners caught stealing (fourth), and eight double plays turned (fifth). He ranked among the leaders again in 1933 with a .994 fielding percentage (second), 44 runners caught stealing (second), a 5.33 range factor per nine innings (second), 546 putouts (third), 79 assists (third), and 14 double plays turned (third).

On December 12, 1933, the Tigers acquired Hall of Fame catcher Mickey Cochrane in a trade with the Philadelphia Athletics. With Cochrane's arrival, Hayworth's playing time was reduced to 54 games in 1934 and 51 games in 1935. The Tigers won the American League pennant in both of those seasons with Cochrane as player-manager. Despite the limited playing time, Hayworth hit .293 in 1934 and .309 in 1935. Hayworth attributed his higher average in 1934 and 1935 to having Cochrane facing right-handed pitchers and leaving Hayworth to face only left-handed pitchers.

Cochrane suffered a nervous breakdown during the 1936 season, and Hayworth was called on to catch 81 games. He led the league's catchers with a .988 fielding percentage in 1936. Rudy York became the Tigers' starting catcher in 1937, and Hayworth was limited to 30 games in 1937 and eight games in 1938.

=== Brooklyn, New York and St. Louis ===
On September 14, 1938, Hayworth was selected off waivers by the Brooklyn Dodgers from the Tigers. He appeared in 26 games for the Dodgers in 1938 and 1939.

On September 9, 1939, the Dodgers sent Hayworth to the New York Giants in exchange for $6,000 and in completion of another deal made two days earlier. He appeared in only five games for the Giants and was released on December 4, 1940.

Hayworth signed with the Milwaukee Brewers of the American Association in the spring of 1941. He appeared in 40 games for the Brewers, but was released at the end of June.

Hayworth next signed with the St. Louis Browns as a free agent in March 1942. He appeared in only one game and was given an unconditional release in mid-May. He finished the 1942 season playing for the Rochester Red Wings of the International League.

In February 1944, Hayworth signed with the Brooklyn Dodgers who needed an insurance policy in case the team's regular catchers were called to wartime duty. Hayworth remained with the Dodgers in 1944 and 1945 but appeared in only nine games. Interviewed by The Brooklyn Daily Eagle in 1944, Hayworth said he intended to keep playing until his knees "buckle under me," adding: "Baseball is full of regrets when you come down to your last innings. Just when you learn how to play it one morning you wake up with a crick in your knee and you realize you're washed up. It would be great turn back the clock on the outfield wall 10 years. But I guess the same thing could be said of life, too."

=== Managerial and scouting career ===
In December 1945, Brooklyn Dodgers president Branch Rickey hired Hayworth to take over as manager of the club's Texas League affiliate, the Fort Worth Cats. Hayworth coached at Fort Worth during the 1946 season and also worked as a scout for Rickey and the Dodgers in the Negro leagues.

In 1947, Hayworth became manager of the Macon Peaches, a Chicago Cubs affiliate. He went on to scout for the Cubs from 1947 to 1959, serving as the club's chief of scouting operations in 1959. He later scouted for the Milwaukee / Atlanta Braves (1960–1970) and the Montreal Expos (1971–1973). He scouted Ernie Banks for the Cubs and arranged to buy Banks' contract for $22,000.

== Family and later years ==
Hayworth was married in 1927 to Virginia Jones. They two sons, Raymond Jr. and John D. His grandson, J. D. Hayworth, was a Republican Party member of the United States House of Representatives from Arizona.

In 2002, Hayworth died in Salisbury, North Carolina, at age of 98. At the time of his death, he was the oldest living former major league player. He was buried at Guilford Memorial Park in Greensboro, North Carolina.

Records
Preceded by Ralph Erickson	Oldest recognized verified living baseball player June 27, 2002 – September 25, 2002	Succeeded by Paul Hopkins
