= Gee Walker =

American baseball player (1908–1981)

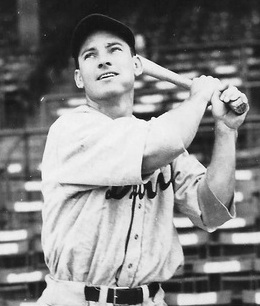
- Walker, circa 1931–37
- Outfielder
- Born: March 19, 1908; Gulfport, Mississippi, U.S.
- Died: March 20, 1981 (aged 73); Jackson, Mississippi, U.S.
- Batted: Right Threw: Right

MLB debut
- April 14, 1931, for the Detroit Tigers

Last MLB appearance
- September 30, 1945, for the Cincinnati Reds

MLB statistics
- Batting average: .294
- Home runs: 124
- Runs batted in: 998
- Stats at Baseball Reference

Teams
- Detroit Tigers (1931–1937); Chicago White Sox (1938–1939); Washington Senators (1940); Cleveland Indians (1941); Cincinnati Reds (1942–1945)

Career highlights and awards
- All-Star (1937); World Series champion (1935)

Gerald Holmes "Gee" Walker (March 19, 1908 – March 20, 1981) was an American professional baseball outfielder who played in Major League Baseball. During his fifteen-year career he played with the Detroit Tigers, Chicago White Sox, Washington Senators, Cleveland Indians and Cincinnati Reds.

Walker played in 1,784 major league games over 15 seasons with a career batting average of .294, with 1,991 hits, 124 home runs and 998 RBI. He had 223 stolen bases, finishing nine times among the top ten for the season. He played for the Tigers in two World Series; 1934 when they lost to the St. Louis Cardinals, and 1935 when they beat the Chicago Cubs.

== Early years ==
Born in Gulfport, Mississippi, Walker attended the University of Mississippi and was a member of the Class of 1930. He played both football and baseball at Ole Miss, and is in both the Mississippi Sports Hall of Fame and the Ole Miss Sports Hall of Fame.

== Career ==
Gee — a fiery competitor and a clown — became a favorite in Detroit. His antics earned him the moniker "The Madman from Mississippi." He hit .300 or better in five of his first seven seasons. Though regularly among the league leaders in stolen bases, he could also be inattentive and overzealous on the basepaths. He once tried to steal a base during an intentional walk. In the 1934 World Series, he was picked off first while arguing with the Cardinal bench. Earlier that year, on June 30, he was picked off base twice in the same inning. After Hank Greenberg singled, Walker reached on an error but was caught off base when the catcher threw to first. Greenberg tried to draw a throw by running to third base and was thrown out, with Walker taking second base. Moments later, with Walker standing six feet off the bag, the pitcher threw to second base and Walker was tagged out. Detroit manager Mickey Cochrane was so angered by Walker's inattention that he suspended Walker for 10 days and fined him $20.

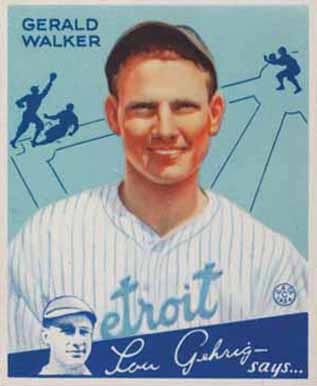
A 1934 Goudey baseball card of Walker

In 1936, Walker hit .353 — the highest batting average of his career and 6th highest in the American League. He also hit 55 doubles — second only to his teammate Charlie Gehringer.

In 1937, Walker began the season on fire. On Opening Day, he hit for the cycle — the only player to accomplish that feat on Opening Day. He did it in reverse order (called an "unnatural cycle") – starting with a home run, followed by triple, then a double and finally a single. He continued his hot hitting with a 27-game streak in April and May, and his fast start put him in the 1937 All-Star Game, although he did not appear in the game. He ended 1937 with a career-high 18 HR, 113 RBIs and .335 average.

Despite Walker's strong performance that year, the Tigers (reportedly unhappy with his antics) traded him after the season. They sent two of their most popular players, Walker and Marv Owen, to the White Sox for Vern Kennedy, Tony Piet and Dixie Walker. The trade caused an uproar with Tiger fans, and owner Walter Briggs was forced to issue an announcement from his Miami home that "the deal was made with my approval."

Walker continued to hit well for several years afterward, but was traded four more times. In December 1939, he was traded to the Washington Senators for Pete Appleton and Taffy Wright. In December 1940, he was traded to the Boston Red Sox for Doc Cramer and then sent to the Cleveland Indians.

While playing for the Cincinnati Reds in 1942, in the second game of a doubleheader against the St. Louis Cardinals on May 30, Walker collided in the outfield with fellow Mississippi native Harry Craft, and both were unable to finish the game. Their injuries led to the major league debut of Clyde Vollmer the next day.

== Later years ==
After retiring as a player, Walker served for a year as a coach for the Cincinnati Reds, in 1946.

Walker died in 1981 at Mississippi State Hospital in Jackson, Mississippi, one day after his birthday, at age 73 after a long illness. He was survived by four sons, a daughter and two brothers, one of whom, Hub Walker, was also a former major league outfielder, with Detroit and Cincinnati.

== See also ==
- List of Major League Baseball career stolen bases leaders
- List of Major League Baseball players to hit for the cycle

Achievements
| Preceded by Sam Leslie | Hitting for the cycle April 20, 1937 | Succeeded by Joe DiMaggio |
