= 1937 Chicago White Sox season =

1937 Chicago White Sox
- League: American League
- Ballpark: Comiskey Park
- City: Chicago, Illinois
- Owners: J. Louis Comiskey
- General manager: Harry Grabiner
- Managers: Jimmy Dykes
- Radio: WBBM (Pat Flanagan, George Sutherland); WCFL (Hal Totten); WGN (Bob Elson); WIND (Russ Hodges); WJJD (John Harrington)

The 1937 Chicago White Sox season was the White Sox's 37th season in the major leagues, and their 38th season overall . They finished with a record of 86–68, good enough for third place in the American League, 16 games behind the first place New York Yankees.

== Regular season ==
=== Season standings ===
American League
Team	W	L	Pct.	GB	Home	Road
New York Yankees	102	52	.662	—	57‍–‍20	45‍–‍32
Detroit Tigers	89	65	.578	13	49‍–‍28	40‍–‍37
Chicago White Sox	86	68	.558	16	47‍–‍30	39‍–‍38
Cleveland Indians	83	71	.539	19	50‍–‍28	33‍–‍43
Boston Red Sox	80	72	.526	21	44‍–‍29	36‍–‍43
Washington Senators	73	80	.477	28½	43‍–‍35	30‍–‍45
Philadelphia Athletics	54	97	.358	46½	27‍–‍50	27‍–‍47
St. Louis Browns	46	108	.299	56	25‍–‍51	21‍–‍57

=== Record vs. opponents ===
1937 American League record Sources:
Team	BOS	CWS	CLE	DET	NYY	PHA	SLB	WSH
Boston	—	10–12	11–11	12–10–1	7–15	17–3	15–7	8–14–1
Chicago	12–10	—	10–12	8–14	9–13	15–7	18–4	14–8
Cleveland	11–11	12–10	—	11–11	7–15–1	13–9	18–4–1	11–11
Detroit	10–12–1	14–8	11–11	—	9–13	14–8	15–7	16–6
New York	15–7	13–9	15–7–1	13–9	—	14–8	16–6–1	16–6–1
Philadelphia	3–17	7–15	9–13	8–14	8–14	—	11–11	8–13–3
St. Louis	7–15	4–18	4–18–1	7–15	6–16–1	11–11	—	7–15
Washington	14–8–1	8–14	11–11	6–16	6–16–1	13–8–3	15–7	—

=== Opening Day lineup ===
- Rip Radcliff, LF
- Larry Rosenthal, CF
- Dixie Walker, RF
- Zeke Bonura, 1B
- Luke Appling, SS
- Jackie Hayes, 2B
- Boze Berger, 3B
- Luke Sewell, C
- Vern Kennedy, P

=== Roster ===
1937 Chicago White Sox
Roster
Pitchers: 26 Clint Brown; 17 Sugar Cain; 30,47 Italo Chelini; 66 Bill Cox; 18 Bill Dietrich; 45 George Gick; 24 Vern Kennedy; 27 Thornton Lee; 16 Ted Lyons; 20,29 Johnny Rigney; 25 Monty Stratton; 28,34 John Whitehead	Catchers: 35 Tony Rensa; 14 Luke Sewell; 15 Merv Shea; Infielders: 4 Luke Appling; 19 Boze Berger; 3 Zeke Bonura; 44 Merv Connors; 5 Jimmy Dykes; 6 Mule Haas; 37 Jackie Hayes; 2 Tony Piet	Outfielders: 8 Mike Kreevich; 9 Rip Radcliff; 12 Larry Rosenthal; 46 Hank Steinbacher; 7 Dixie Walker	Manager: 5 Jimmy Dykes; Coaches: 33 Jimmy Austin; 38 Muddy Ruel; 22 Bill Webb

== Player stats ==
=== Batting ===
Note: G = Games played; AB = At Bats; R = Runs scored; H = Hits; 2B = Doubles; 3B = Triples; HR = Home runs; RBI = Runs batted in; BB = Base on balls; SO = Strikeouts; AVG = Batting average; SB = Stolen bases

Player	G	AB	R	H	2B	3B	HR	RBI	BB	SO	AVG	SB
Luke Appling, SS	154	574	98	182	42	8	4	77	86	28	.317	18
Boze Berger, 3B	52	130	19	31	5	0	5	13	15	24	.238	1
Zeke Bonura, 1B	116	447	79	154	41	2	19	100	49	24	.345	5
Merv Connors, 3B	28	103	12	24	4	1	2	12	14	19	.233	2
Jimmy Dykes, 1B, 3B	30	85	10	26	5	0	1	23	9	7	.306	0
Mule Haas, 1B	54	111	8	23	3	3	0	15	16	10	.207	1
Jackie Hayes, 2B	143	573	63	131	27	4	2	79	41	37	.229	1
Mike Kreevich, CF	144	583	94	176	29	16	12	73	43	45	.302	10
Tony Piet, 3B, 2B	100	332	34	78	15	1	4	38	32	36	.235	14
Rip Radcliff, LF	144	584	105	190	38	10	4	79	53	25	.325	6
Tony Rensa, C	26	57	10	17	5	1	0	5	8	6	.298	3
Larry Rosenthal, CF	58	97	20	28	5	3	0	9	9	20	.289	1
Luke Sewell, C	122	412	51	111	21	6	1	61	46	18	.269	4
Merv Shea, C	25	71	7	15	1	0	0	5	15	10	.211	1
Hank Steinbacher, LF	26	73	13	19	4	1	1	9	4	7	.260	2
Dixie Walker, RF	154	593	105	179	28	16	9	95	78	26	.302	1

Player	G	AB	R	H	2B	3B	HR	RBI	BB	SO	AVG	SB
Clint Brown, P	53	18	1	4	0	0	0	3	5	5	.222	0
Sugar Cain, P	18	22	2	4	0	0	0	2	0	4	.182	0
Italo Chelini, P	4	1	0	0	0	0	0	0	1	0	.000	0
Bill Cox, P	3	4	0	1	0	0	0	0	0	1	.250	0
Bill Dietrich, P	29	44	6	8	0	1	0	1	7	20	.182	0
Vern Kennedy, P	32	87	12	20	1	1	2	9	0	17	.230	0
Thornton Lee, P	30	71	5	15	3	2	0	4	1	16	.211	0
Ted Lyons, P	23	67	6	12	0	0	0	3	9	14	.211	0
Johnny Rigney, P	22	30	4	5	0	0	0	0	4	9	.167	0
Monty Stratton, P	22	60	9	12	2	0	1	6	0	9	.200	0
John Whitehead, P	26	58	7	13	1	0	0	5	4	10	.224	0
Team totals	154	5277	780	1478	280	76	67	726	549	447	.280	70

=== Pitching ===
Note: W = Wins; L = Losses; ERA = Earned run average; G = Games pitched; GS = Games started; SV = Saves; IP = Innings pitched; H = Hits allowed; R = Runs allowed; ER = Earned runs allowed; HR = Home runs allowed; BB = Walks allowed; K = Strikeouts

Player	W	L	ERA	G	GS	SV	IP	H	R	ER	HR	BB	K
Clint Brown	7	7	3.42	53	0	18	100.0	92	47	38	8	36	51
Sugar Cain	4	2	6.16	18	6	0	68.2	88	48	47	7	51	17
Italo Chelini	0	1	10.38	4	0	0	8.2	15	10	10	2	0	3
Bill Cox	1	0	0.71	3	2	0	12.2	9	1	1	0	5	8
Bill Dietrich	8	10	4.90	29	20	1	143.1	162	93	78	15	72	62
George Gick	0	0	0.00	1	0	1	2.0	0	0	0	0	0	1
Vern Kennedy	14	13	5.09	32	30	0	221.0	238	150	125	16	124	116
Thornton Lee	12	10	3.52	30	25	0	204.2	209	91	80	16	60	80
Ted Lyons	12	7	4.15	22	22	0	169.1	182	86	78	21	45	45
Johnny Rigney	2	5	4.96	22	4	1	90.2	107	65	50	10	46	38
Monty Stratton	15	5	2.40	22	21	0	164.2	142	55	44	6	37	69
John Whitehead	11	8	4.07	26	24	0	165.2	191	84	75	14	56	45
Team totals	86	68	4.17	154	154	21	1351.1	1435	730	626	115	532	533

== Farm system ==
Level	Team	League	Manager
AA	St. Paul Saints	American Association	Gabby Street and Phil Todt
A1	Dallas Steers	Texas League	Alex Gaston, Firpo Marberry and Ray Brubaker
C	Vicksburg Hill Billies	Cotton States League	Ray Brubaker and Al Libby
C	Longview Cannibals	East Texas League	Harry Faulkner and Wally Paschal
C	Dayton Ducks	Middle Atlantic League	Ducky Holmes
D	Rayne Rice Birds	Evangeline League	Harold Funk
