= 1937 Cleveland Indians season =

1937 Cleveland Indians
- League: American League
- Ballpark: League Park; Cleveland Municipal Stadium
- City: Cleveland, Ohio
- Owners: Alva Bradley
- General managers: Cy Slapnicka
- Managers: Steve O'Neill
- Radio: WHK (Jack Graney)

The 1937 Cleveland Indians season was a season in American baseball. The team finished fourth in the American League with a record of 83–71, 19 games behind the New York Yankees.

== Regular season ==
- April 20, 1937: Gee Walker of the Detroit Tigers' became the first (and to date only) man to hit for the cycle on Opening Day. Walker did it in reverse order (home run, triple, double, single) to lead the Tigers past the Indians 4–3 on April 20, 1937.

=== Season standings ===
American League
Team	W	L	Pct.	GB	Home	Road
New York Yankees	102	52	.662	—	57‍–‍20	45‍–‍32
Detroit Tigers	89	65	.578	13	49‍–‍28	40‍–‍37
Chicago White Sox	86	68	.558	16	47‍–‍30	39‍–‍38
Cleveland Indians	83	71	.539	19	50‍–‍28	33‍–‍43
Boston Red Sox	80	72	.526	21	44‍–‍29	36‍–‍43
Washington Senators	73	80	.477	28½	43‍–‍35	30‍–‍45
Philadelphia Athletics	54	97	.358	46½	27‍–‍50	27‍–‍47
St. Louis Browns	46	108	.299	56	25‍–‍51	21‍–‍57

=== Record vs. opponents ===
1937 American League record Sources:
Team	BOS	CWS	CLE	DET	NYY	PHA	SLB	WSH
Boston	—	10–12	11–11	12–10–1	7–15	17–3	15–7	8–14–1
Chicago	12–10	—	10–12	8–14	9–13	15–7	18–4	14–8
Cleveland	11–11	12–10	—	11–11	7–15–1	13–9	18–4–1	11–11
Detroit	10–12–1	14–8	11–11	—	9–13	14–8	15–7	16–6
New York	15–7	13–9	15–7–1	13–9	—	14–8	16–6–1	16–6–1
Philadelphia	3–17	7–15	9–13	8–14	8–14	—	11–11	8–13–3
St. Louis	7–15	4–18	4–18–1	7–15	6–16–1	11–11	—	7–15
Washington	14–8–1	8–14	11–11	6–16	6–16–1	13–8–3	15–7	—

=== Roster ===
1937 Cleveland Indians
Roster
Pitchers: 15 Johnny Allen; 19 Ivy Andrews; 21 Lloyd Brown; 14 Bob Feller; 29 Carl Fischer; 16 Denny Galehouse; 18 Mel Harder; 17 Joe Heving; 12 Willis Hudlin; 19 Ken Jungels; 11 Earl Whitehill; 20 Whit Wyatt	Catchers: 10 Joe Becker; 8 Frankie Pytlak; 9 Billy Sullivan; Infielders: 4 Odell Hale; 5 Roy Hughes; 25 Ken Keltner; 22 John Kroner; 1 Lyn Lary; 24 Blas Monaco; 7 Hal Trosky	Outfielders: 2 Hugh Alexander; 3 Earl Averill; 23 Bruce Campbell; 24 Jeff Heath; 6 Moose Solters; 2 Roy Weatherly; Other batters: -- Bill Sodd	Manager: 26 Steve O'Neill; Coaches: 27 Wally Schang; 28 George Uhle

== Player stats ==
=== Batting ===
==== Starters by position ====
Note: Pos = Position; G = Games played; AB = At bats; H = Hits; Avg. = Batting average; HR = Home runs; RBI = Runs batted in

Pos	Player	G	AB	H	Avg.	HR	RBI
C	Frankie Pytlak	125	397	125	.315	1	44
1B	Hal Trosky	153	601	179	.298	32	128
2B	John Kroner	86	283	67	.237	2	26
SS	Lyn Lary	156	644	187	.290	8	77
3B	Odell Hale	154	561	150	.267	6	82
OF	Moose Solters	152	589	190	.323	20	109
OF	Bruce Campbell	134	448	135	.301	4	61
OF	Earl Averill	156	609	182	.299	21	92

==== Other batters ====
Note: G = Games played; AB = At bats; H = Hits; Avg. = Batting average; HR = Home runs; RBI = Runs batted in

Player	G	AB	H	Avg.	HR	RBI
Roy Hughes	104	346	96	.277	1	40
Billy Sullivan	72	168	48	.286	3	22
Roy Weatherly	53	134	27	.201	5	13
Jeff Heath	20	61	14	.230	0	8
Joe Becker	18	33	11	.333	0	2
Hugh Alexander	7	11	1	.091	0	0
Blas Monaco	5	7	2	.286	0	2
Ken Keltner	1	1	0	.000	0	1
Bill Sodd	1	1	0	.000	0	0

=== Pitching ===
==== Starting pitchers ====
Note: G = Games pitched; IP = Innings pitched; W = Wins; L = Losses; ERA = Earned run average; SO = Strikeouts

Player	G	IP	W	L	ERA	SO
Mel Harder	38	233.2	15	12	4.28	95
Denny Galehouse	36	200.2	9	14	4.57	78
Willis Hudlin	35	175.2	12	11	4.10	31
Johnny Allen	24	173.0	15	1	2.55	87
Bob Feller	26	148.2	9	7	3.39	150
Earl Whitehill	33	147.0	8	8	6.49	53

==== Other pitchers ====
Note: G = Games pitched; IP = Innings pitched; W = Wins; L = Losses; ERA = Earned run average; SO = Strikeouts

Player	G	IP	W	L	ERA	SO
Ken Jungels	2	3.0	0	0	0.00	0
Carl Fischer	2	0.2	0	1	27.00	1

==== Relief pitchers ====
Note: G = Games pitched; W = Wins; L = Losses; SV = Saves; ERA = Earned run average; SO = Strikeouts

Player	G	W	L	SV	ERA	SO
Joe Heving	40	8	4	5	4.83	35
Lloyd Brown	31	2	6	0	6.55	32
Whit Wyatt	29	2	3	0	4.44	52
Ivy Andrews	20	3	4	0	4.37	16

== Awards and honors ==
All Star Game

Earl Averill, outfielder (starter)

Mel Harder, pitcher

== Farm system ==
Level	Team	League	Manager
AA	Milwaukee Brewers	American Association	Allen Sothoron
A1	New Orleans Pelicans	Southern Association	Larry Gilbert
B	Montgomery Bombers	Southeastern League	Ken Penner, Harry Griswold and Bud Connolly
C	Oswego Netherlands	Canadian–American League	Riley Parker
C	Springfield Indians	Middle Atlantic League	Earl Wolgamot
D	Troy Trojans	Alabama–Florida League	Charlie Moss
D	Hopkinsville Hoppers	KITTY League	Red Smith
D	Owensboro Oilers	KITTY League	Hughie Wise
D	Newton-Conover Twins	North Carolina State League	Phil Lundeen, Buz Phillips and Ray Lindsey
D	Fargo-Moorhead Twins	Northern League	Jack Knight
D	Wausau Lumberjacks	Northern League	Dickey Kerr
