= House at 511 Watertown Street =

Historic house in Massachusetts, United States

- U.S. National Register of Historic Places
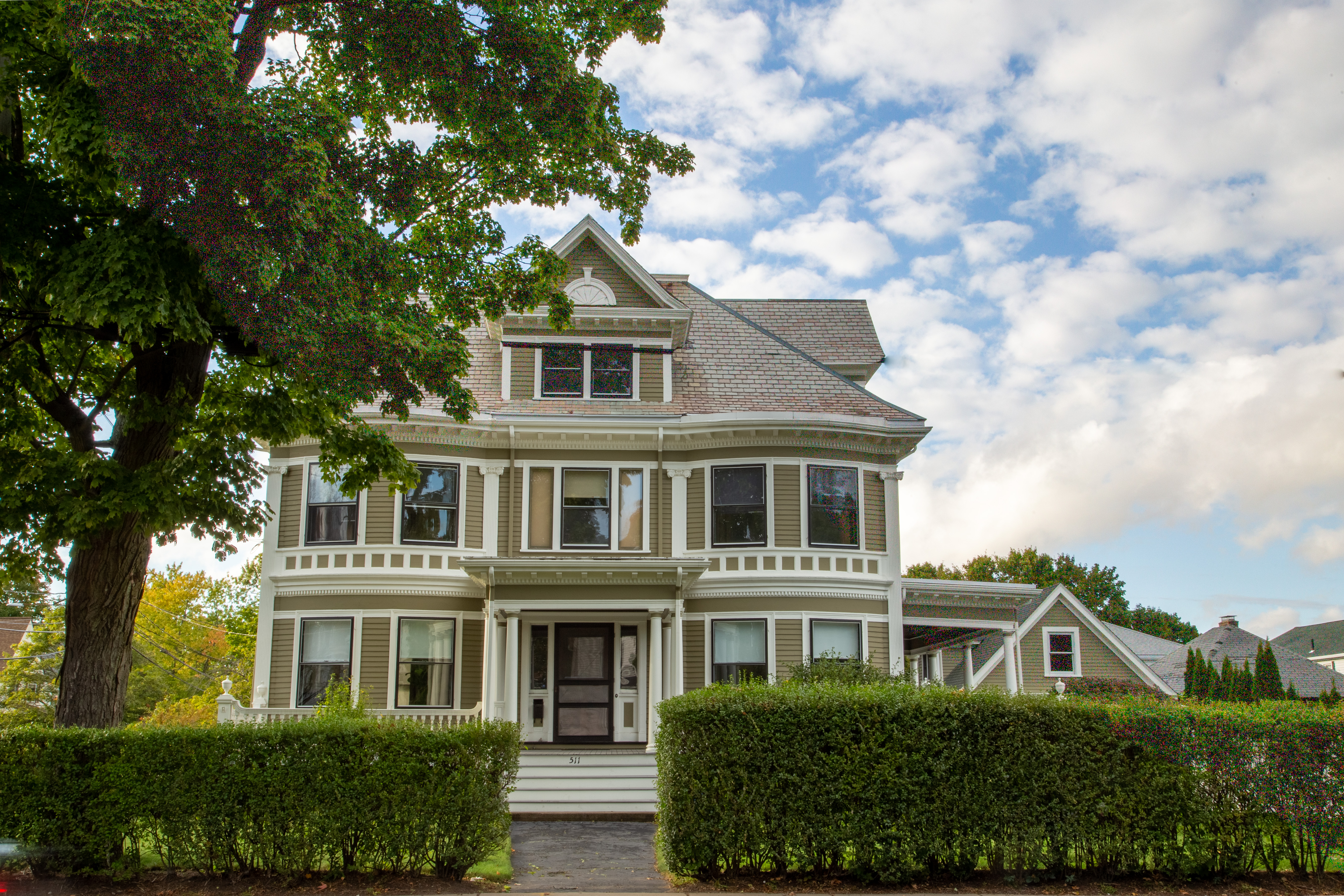
- House at 511 in the Summer

- Location within Greater Boston area Location within Massachusetts Location within the United States
- Location: 511 Watertown St., Newtonville, Massachusetts
- Coordinates: 42°21′27.5″N 71°12′22.0″W
- Area: 0.28 acres (0.11 ha)
- Built: 1897
- Architectural style: Colonial Revival
- MPS: Newton MRA
- NRHP reference No.: 86001832
- Added to NRHP: September 04, 1986

The House at 511 Watertown Street in Newton, Massachusetts is one of the city's finer Colonial Revival houses completed in 1897. The house was listed on the National Register of Historic Places in 1986 and is on the border of two of Newton's older villages: Newtonville and Nonantum.

== History ==
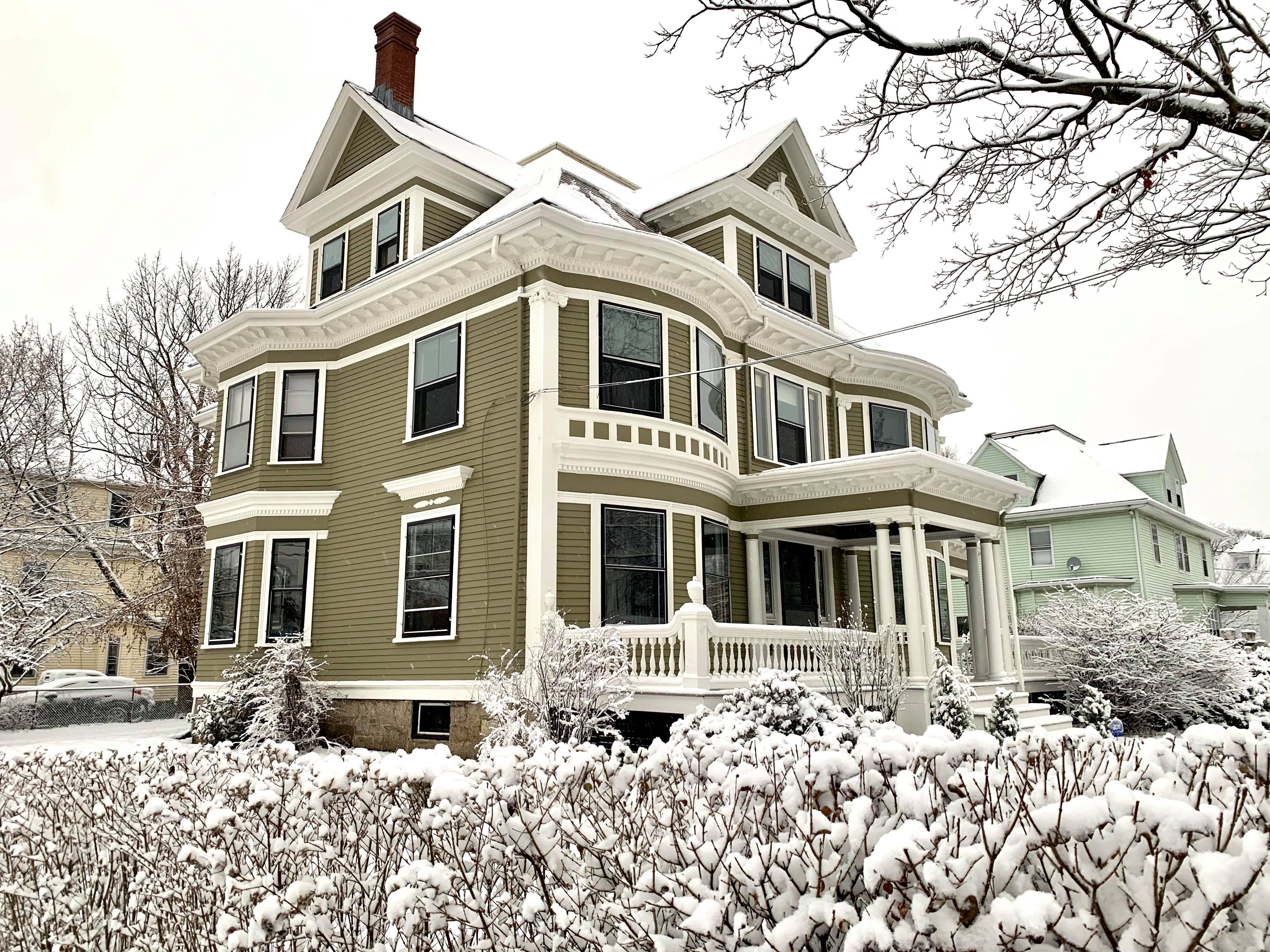

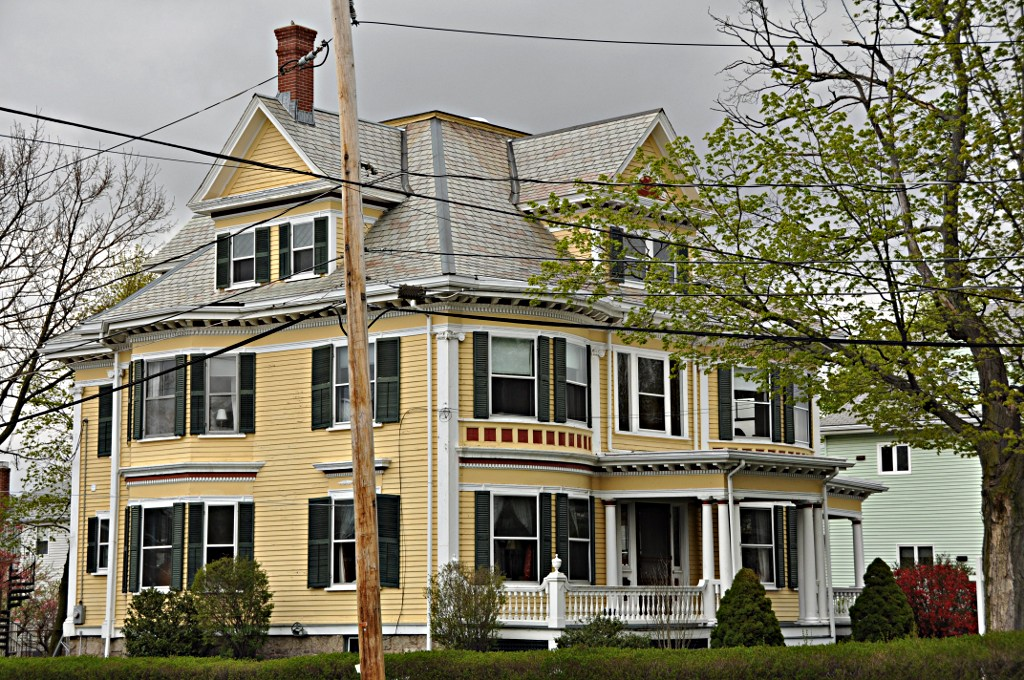

Completed in 1897, the 2 1/2-story wood-frame house confines to a rectilinear shape and features a symmetrical arrangement of large two-story front bow windows, modillion cornices, and large bell cast dormers in its truncated hip roof with fully pedimented gables, boxy massing. This home has more elaborate classical detailing than other nearby examples including enriched moldings, ionic corner pilasters, and a Palladian motif in the front dormer. The front entrance occupied a center position and is sheltered by a flat-roof porch supported by grouped columns.

The first owner, Morgan Mahoney, was a Nonantum grocer who immigrated to the US from Ireland in the mid-1800s and originally worked in the textile industries of Nonantum. Morgan lived there with his family until November 1920. A building permit from 1922 recorded the building of the multi-car garage on the property by Margaret Mahoney.

The house was listed on the National Register of Historic Places in 1986. Kathlyn Hatch and the Newton Historical Commission recorded this submission in 1976. Kathlyn Hatch was an architectural educator and author who taught historic preservation and architectural history at multiple universities including Boston University, University of North Carolina, University of Vermont, University of Florida, and State University of New York. Kathlyn was a consultant to the book titled "Newton's 19th Century Architecture: Newton Corner and Nonantum" which details the history of Newton's architectural heritage by identifying and studying structures in the two of Newton's older villages.

== See also ==
- National Register of Historic Places listings in Newton, Massachusetts
- Newtonville Historic District
- Colonial Revival architecture
