= Jane Boit Patten =

American botanist (1869–1964)

Jane Boit Patten (8 June 1869 – 6 December 1964) was an American botanist. Patten collected plants in Switzerland, Italy, the Kingdom of Hungary and Greece from 1899 to 1900. Her herbarium was given to the Gray Herbarium in 1938.

== Written works ==
- Spring Flora of the Kavoúsi Region in Gournia, Vasiliki and other prehistoric cities on the Isthmus of Hierapetra, Crete; excavations of the Wells-Houston-Cramp expeditions 1901, 1903, 1904, the American exploration Society, Free Museum of science and art, 1908
- Jane Boit Patten, Percy G. Stiles: On the influence of neutral salts upon the rate of salivary digestion. in American Journal of Physiology, Vol. XVII, No. 1, 1. September 1906, S. 26 (online)
