= H. R. Bankart =

American football player and coach (1881–1939)

Biographical details
- Born: November 16, 1881; England
- Died: January 31, 1939 (aged 57); Newtonville, Massachusetts, U.S.

Playing career
- 1907–1908: Dartmouth

Coaching career (HC unless noted)
- 1910: RPI

Head coaching record
- Overall: 2–4–2

Harold Reginald Bankart (November 16, 1881 – January 31, 1939) was the head football coach for the Rensselaer Polytechnic Institute Engineers football team in 1910. He compiled a record of 2–4–2.

== Head coaching record ==
Year	Team	Overall	Conference	Standing	Bowl/playoffs
RPI Engineers (Independent) (1910)
1910	RPI	2–4–2			
RPI:		2–4–2			
Total:		2–4–2			
