= First Church of Christ, Scientist (Newton, Massachusetts) =

Former church in Newton, Massachusetts

Coordinates: 42°20′51.8″N 71°12′25.7″W

- U.S. Historic district – Contributing property
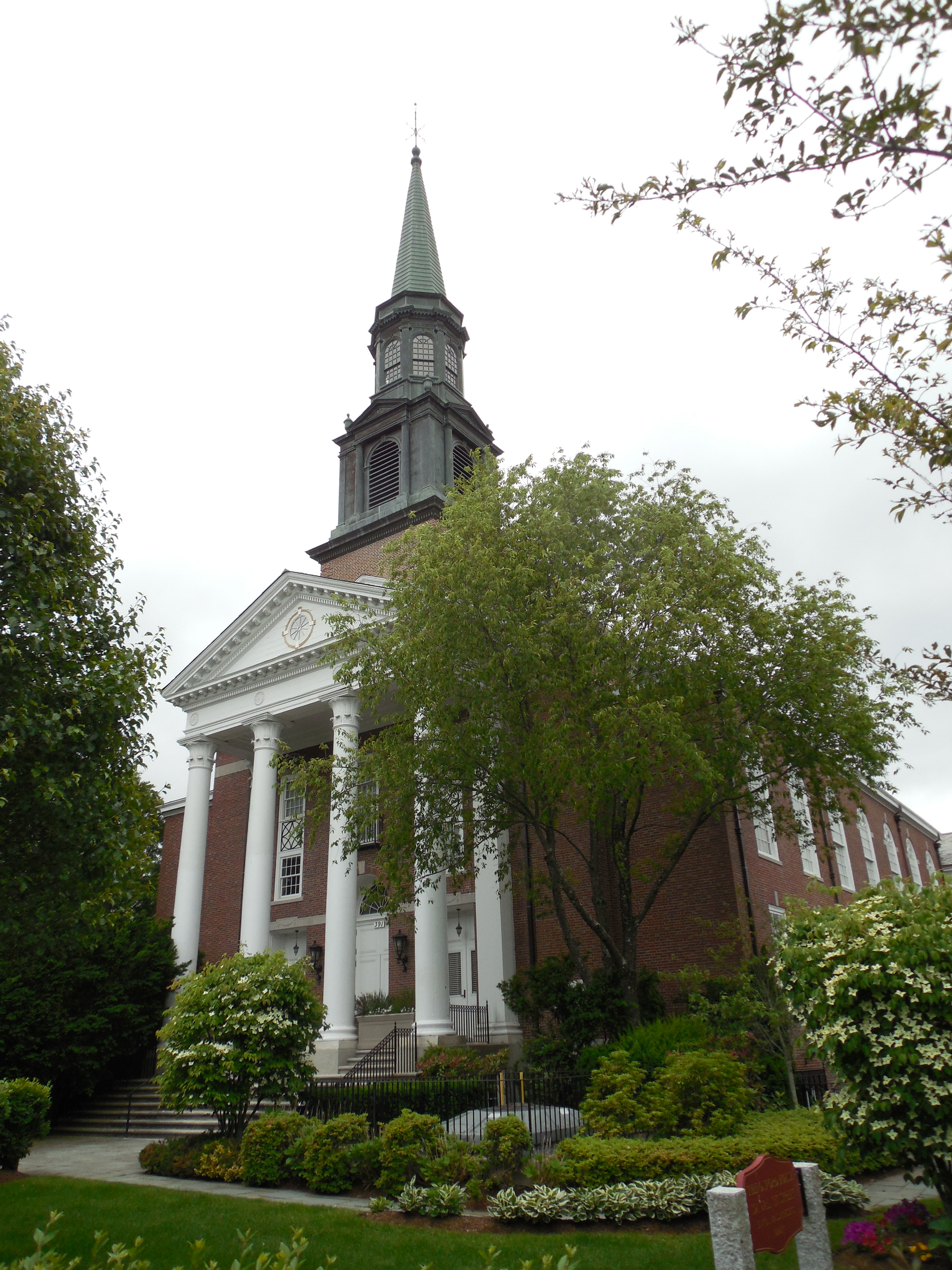
- First Church of Christ, Scientist

- Location within Massachusetts Location within the United States
- Location: Newton, Massachusetts
- Built: 1940
- Architect: Densmore, LeClear and Robbins
- Architectural style: Colonial Revival
- Part of: Newtonville Historic District (ID86001753)

The former First Church of Christ, Scientist, built in 1940, is an historic Christian Science church building located at 391 Walnut Street on the corner of Otis Street in the village of Newtonville, in Newton, Massachusetts. It was designed in the redbrick Colonial Revival style by Densmore, LeClear and Robbins, architects. Due to cost constraints, its steeple was added later. In September, 2004, the church sold its building for $1,050,000 to be converted into apartments. The church in 2007 held services in rented rooms at 300 Walnut Street in the Masonic Building., but is now meeting at 1141 Walnut Street, in Newton Highlands. The building has since been divided into 11 condominium units. It is now called the Oxford House, and was the city's first inclusionary zoning project.

The building is a contributing property in the Newtonville Historic District, which was added to the National Register of Historic Places on September 4, 1986.

== See also ==
- National Register of Historic Places listings in Newton, Massachusetts
- List of former Christian Science churches, societies and buildings
- First Church of Christ, Scientist (disambiguation)
