= Jungels =

Jungels is a surname. Notable people with the surname include:

- Bob Jungels (born 1992), Luxembourgish road bicycle racer
- Ken Jungels (1916–1975), American baseball player
