= 1937 Philadelphia Athletics season =

1937 Philadelphia Athletics
- League: American League
- Ballpark: Shibe Park
- City: Philadelphia
- Record: 54–97 (.358)
- League place: 7th
- Owners: Connie Mack and John Shibe
- Managers: Connie Mack
- Radio: WCAU (Bill Dyer, Roger Griswold)

The 1937 Philadelphia Athletics season involved the A's finishing seventh in the American League with a record of 54 wins and 97 losses.

== Offseason ==
On January 11, 1937, at the club's annual meeting, John Shibe officially retired from the day-to-day operations of the Athletics, although he had not been with the team since August 1936. Connie Mack, the team's other principal owner, was elected club president. Shibe died on July 11, leaving Mack as sole owner of the team.

== Regular season ==
The Athletics had refused the American League's directives to add numbers to all player uniforms, and would not post visiting players' uniform numbers on the scoreboard. The team argued that they posted both teams' full lineups to the scoreboard, then the only ballpark to do so, making numbers superfluous. The team relented to its fans who wished to be able to identify pitchers warming up in the bullpens, and players during pregame practice.

The club started to use uniform numbers during the 1937 season. They were the last team in the American League to do so.

The Athletics set a Major League record which still stands for the fewest batters hit by a pitch in a season, with only 5.

=== Season standings ===
American League
| Team | W | L | Pct. | GB | Home | Road |
|---|---|---|---|---|---|---|
| New York Yankees | 102 | 52 | .662 | — | 57‍–‍20 | 45‍–‍32 |
| Detroit Tigers | 89 | 65 | .578 | 13 | 49‍–‍28 | 40‍–‍37 |
| Chicago White Sox | 86 | 68 | .558 | 16 | 47‍–‍30 | 39‍–‍38 |
| Cleveland Indians | 83 | 71 | .539 | 19 | 50‍–‍28 | 33‍–‍43 |
| Boston Red Sox | 80 | 72 | .526 | 21 | 44‍–‍29 | 36‍–‍43 |
| Washington Senators | 73 | 80 | .477 | 28½ | 43‍–‍35 | 30‍–‍45 |
| Philadelphia Athletics | 54 | 97 | .358 | 46½ | 27‍–‍50 | 27‍–‍47 |
| St. Louis Browns | 46 | 108 | .299 | 56 | 25‍–‍51 | 21‍–‍57 |

=== Record vs. opponents ===
1937 American League record Sources:
| Team | BOS | CWS | CLE | DET | NYY | PHA | SLB | WSH |
|---|---|---|---|---|---|---|---|---|
| Boston | — | 10–12 | 11–11 | 12–10–1 | 7–15 | 17–3 | 15–7 | 8–14–1 |
| Chicago | 12–10 | — | 10–12 | 8–14 | 9–13 | 15–7 | 18–4 | 14–8 |
| Cleveland | 11–11 | 12–10 | — | 11–11 | 7–15–1 | 13–9 | 18–4–1 | 11–11 |
| Detroit | 10–12–1 | 14–8 | 11–11 | — | 9–13 | 14–8 | 15–7 | 16–6 |
| New York | 15–7 | 13–9 | 15–7–1 | 13–9 | — | 14–8 | 16–6–1 | 16–6–1 |
| Philadelphia | 3–17 | 7–15 | 9–13 | 8–14 | 8–14 | — | 11–11 | 8–13–3 |
| St. Louis | 7–15 | 4–18 | 4–18–1 | 7–15 | 6–16–1 | 11–11 | — | 7–15 |
| Washington | 14–8–1 | 8–14 | 11–11 | 6–16 | 6–16–1 | 13–8–3 | 15–7 | — |

=== Roster ===
1937 Philadelphia Athletics
Roster
| Pitchers: 26,41 Fred Archer; 20 George Caster; 18 Herman Fink; 14,19,32 Randy Gumpert; 61 Bill Kalfass; 15 Harry Kelley; 11 Lynn Nelson; 17 Buck Ross; 22 Eddie Smith; 21 Bud Thomas; 24 George Turbeville; 19,25 Al Williams | Catchers: 2 Earle Brucker; 25 Bill Conroy; 1 Frankie Hayes; -- Hal Wagner; Infielders: 4 Wayne Ambler; 4 Bill Cissell; 3 Chubby Dean; 8 Lou Finney; 35 Gene Hasson; 10 Warren Huston; 6 Skeeter Newsome; 19,26 Ace Parker; 12 Rusty Peters; 5 Billy Werber | Outfielders: 10,42 Babe Barna; 15 Jess Hill; 7 Bob Johnson; 92 Doyt Morris; 9 Wally Moses; 23 Jack Rothrock; 8 Eddie Yount | Manager: Connie Mack; Coaches: 29 Charlie Berry; 28 Lena Blackburne; 27 Earle Mack |

== Player stats ==
| = Indicates team leader |

=== Batting ===
==== Starters by position ====
Note: Pos = Position; G = Games played; AB = At bats; H = Hits; Avg. = Batting average; HR = Home runs; RBI = Runs batted in

| Pos | Player | GP | AB | H | Avg. | HR | RBI |
|---|---|---|---|---|---|---|---|
| C | Earle Brucker | 102 | 317 | 82 | .259 | 6 | 37 |
| 1B | Chubby Dean | 104 | 309 | 81 | .262 | 2 | 31 |
| 2B | Rusty Peters | 116 | 339 | 88 | .260 | 3 | 43 |
| SS | Skeeter Newsome | 122 | 438 | 111 | .253 | 1 | 30 |
| 3B | Billy Werber | 128 | 493 | 144 | .292 | 7 | 70 |
| OF | Jess Hill | 70 | 242 | 71 | .293 | 1 | 37 |
| OF | Wally Moses | 154 | 649 | 208 | .320 | 25 | 86 |
| OF | Bob Johnson | 138 | 477 | 146 | .306 | 25 | 108 |

==== Other batters ====
Note: G = Games played; AB = At bats; H = Hits; Avg. = Batting average; HR = Home runs; RBI = Runs batted in

| Player | GP | AB | H | Avg. | HR | RBI |
|---|---|---|---|---|---|---|
| Lou Finney | 92 | 379 | 95 | .251 | 1 | 20 |
| Jack Rothrock | 88 | 232 | 62 | .267 | 0 | 21 |
| Frankie Hayes | 60 | 188 | 49 | .261 | 10 | 38 |
| Wayne Ambler | 56 | 162 | 35 | .216 | 0 | 11 |
| Bill Cissell | 34 | 117 | 31 | .265 | 1 | 14 |
| Gene Hasson | 28 | 98 | 30 | .306 | 3 | 14 |
| Ace Parker | 38 | 94 | 11 | .117 | 2 | 13 |
| Bill Conroy | 26 | 60 | 12 | .200 | 0 | 3 |
| Warren Huston | 38 | 54 | 7 | .130 | 0 | 3 |
| Babe Barna | 14 | 36 | 14 | .389 | 2 | 9 |
| Doyt Morris | 6 | 13 | 2 | .154 | 0 | 0 |
| Eddie Yount | 4 | 7 | 2 | .286 | 0 | 1 |
| Hal Wagner | 1 | 0 | 0 | ---- | 0 | 0 |

=== Pitching ===
| = Indicates league leader |

==== Starting pitchers ====
Note: G = Games pitched; IP = Innings pitched; W = Wins; L = Losses; ERA = Earned run average; SO = Strikeouts

| Player | G | IP | W | L | ERA | SO |
|---|---|---|---|---|---|---|
| George Caster | 34 | 231.2 | 12 | 19 | 4.43 | 100 |
| Harry Kelley | 41 | 205.0 | 13 | 21 | 5.36 | 68 |
| Bud Thomas | 35 | 169.2 | 8 | 15 | 4.99 | 54 |
| Buck Ross | 28 | 147.1 | 5 | 10 | 4.89 | 37 |

==== Other pitchers ====
Note: G = Games pitched; IP = Innings pitched; W = Wins; L = Losses; ERA = Earned run average; SO = Strikeouts

| Player | G | IP | W | L | ERA | SO |
|---|---|---|---|---|---|---|
| Eddie Smith | 38 | 196.2 | 4 | 17 | 3.94 | 79 |
| Al Williams | 16 | 75.1 | 4 | 1 | 5.38 | 27 |
| Bill Kalfass | 3 | 12.0 | 1 | 0 | 3.00 | 9 |
| Chubby Dean | 2 | 9.0 | 1 | 0 | 4.00 | 4 |

==== Relief pitchers ====
Note: G = Games pitched; W = Wins; L = Losses; SV = Saves; ERA = Earned run average; SO = Strikeouts

| Player | G | W | L | SV | ERA | SO |
|---|---|---|---|---|---|---|
| George Turbeville | 31 | 0 | 4 | 0 | 4.77 | 17 |
| Lynn Nelson | 30 | 4 | 9 | 2 | 5.90 | 49 |
| Herman Fink | 28 | 2 | 1 | 1 | 4.05 | 18 |
| Randy Gumpert | 10 | 0 | 0 | 0 | 12.00 | 5 |
| Fred Archer | 1 | 0 | 0 | 0 | 6.00 | 2 |

== Farm system ==
| Level | Team | League | Manager |
|---|---|---|---|
| A | Williamsport Grays | New York–Pennsylvania League | Ollie Marquardt |
| D | Federalsburg Athletics | Eastern Shore League | George Short |
