= Bill Sodd =

American baseball player (1914–1998)

- Pinch hitter
- Born: September 18, 1914; Fort Worth, Texas, U.S.
- Died: May 14, 1998 (aged 83); Fort Worth, Texas, U.S.
- Batted: Right Threw: Right

MLB debut
- September 27, 1937, for the Cleveland Indians

Last MLB appearance
- September 27, 1937, for the Cleveland Indians
- Stats at Baseball Reference

Teams
- Cleveland Indians (1937)

William Sodd (September 18, 1914 – May 14, 1998) was an American Major League Baseball player who played for one season. He appeared in one game as a pinch hitter for the Cleveland Indians on September 27 during the 1937 Cleveland Indians season. He struck out in his only at bat.
