= Warren Huston =

American baseball player (1913–1999)

- Huston with the Philadelphia Athletics, c. 1937
- Infielder
- Born: October 31, 1913; Newtonville, Massachusetts, US
- Died: August 30, 1999 (aged 85); Wareham, Massachusetts, US
- Batted: Right Threw: Right

MLB debut
- June 24, 1937, for the Philadelphia Athletics

Last MLB appearance
- September 4, 1944, for the Boston Braves

Career statistics
- Batting average: .165
- Home runs: 0
- Runs batted in: 4
- Stats at Baseball Reference

Teams
- Philadelphia Athletics (1937); Boston Braves (1944)

Warren Llewellyn Huston (October 31, 1913 – August 30, 1999) was an American professional baseball infielder. He played for two teams in Major League Baseball (MLB); the 1937 Philadelphia Athletics and the 1944 Boston Braves. Listed at 6 feet 0 inches (1.83 m) and 170 pounds (77 kg), he batted and threw right-handed.

== Biography ==
Huston was born in 1913 in Newtonville, Massachusetts, and graduated from Newton High School in 1933. He attended Springfield College as a member of the class of 1937, where he played college football as a halfback and college baseball as a shortstop. He was the captain of the football team during their 1936 season, his senior year. He played four seasons in minor league baseball: 1938, 1942, 1943, and 1945. Statistics for his minor league career are incomplete; in his final season, 1945 with the Columbus Red Birds, he had a .243 batting average with 31 RBIs.

Huston played two seasons in the major leagues. In 1937, he appeared in 38 games with the Philadelphia Athletics, playing as a shortstop, second baseman, and third baseman. He hit .130 (7-for-54) with three RBIs. In 1944, with many younger players serving in the military due to World War II, Huston returned to the major leagues with the Boston Braves. He played in 33 games, again at three infield positions, batting .200 (11-for-55) with one RBI. At the end of the season, Huston was traded to the St. Louis Cardinals in exchange for first baseman Joe Mack. Huston would spend 1945 in the minor leagues, while Mack appeared in 66 games for the Braves in his only season as a major leaguer. Overall, Huston hit .165 in his 71 career major league games, with a .933 fielding average.

Following his playing career, Huston managed a collegiate summer baseball team, the Brattleboro Maples of the Northern League, during 1946 and part of the 1947 season. He served as head football coach back in his hometown at Newton High School circa 1947–1952. Huston was inducted to the Springfield College athletic hall of fame in 1977, and the Newton Public Schools athletic hall of fame in 2005. He died in 1999 in Wareham, Massachusetts.
