= Stanley, North Carolina =

- Town
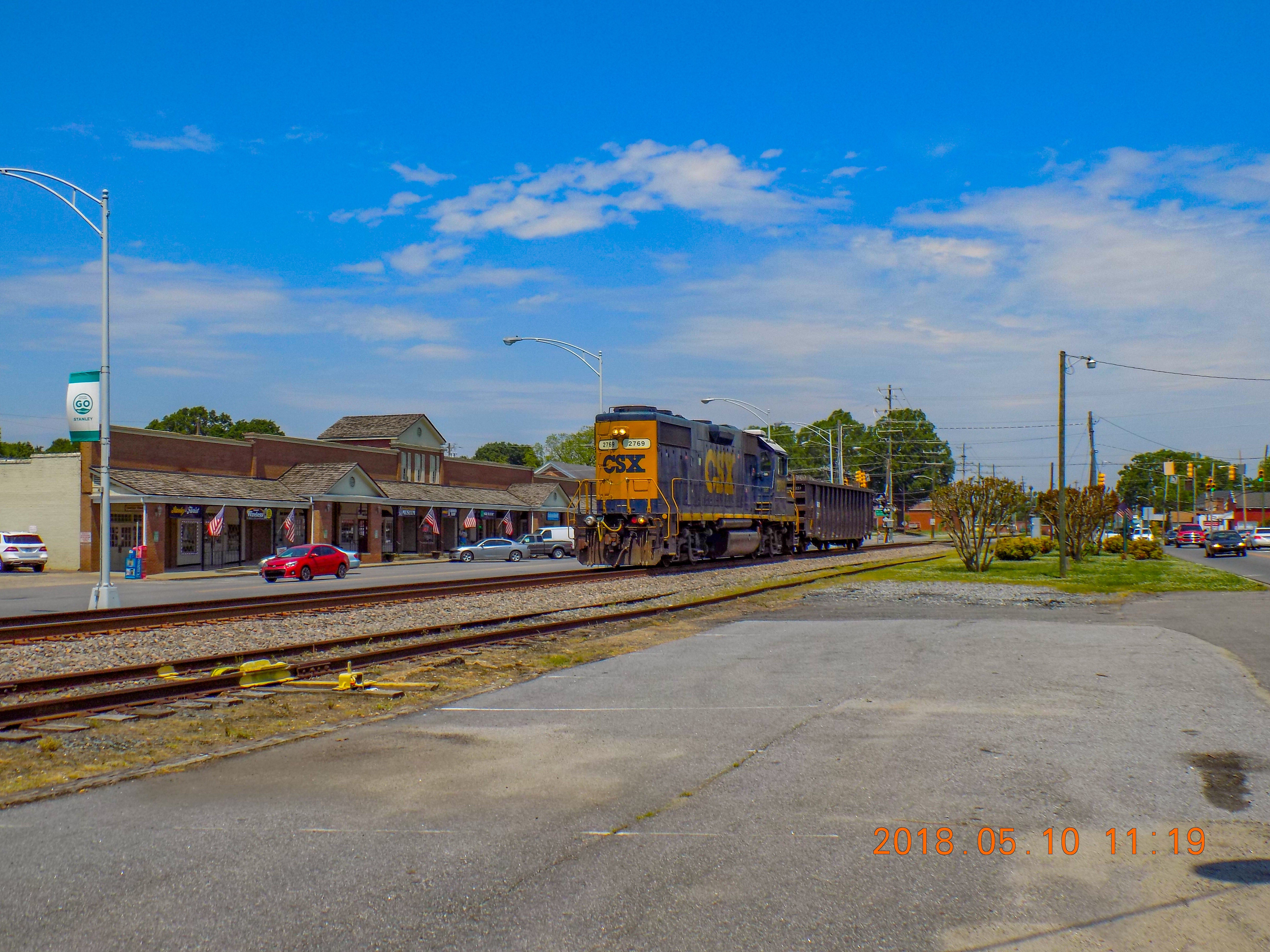
- Downtown Stanley, NC looking north west
- Nickname: Stanley Creek
- Motto: A Friendly Place
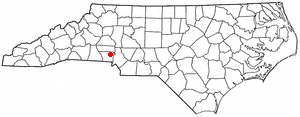
- Location of Stanley, North Carolina
- Coordinates: 35°21′19″N 81°05′37″W
- Country: United States
- State: North Carolina
- County: Gaston
- Established: 1879

Government
  - Mayor: Cathy Kirkland

Area
  - Total: 2.71 sq mi (7.02 km^{2})
  - Land: 2.69 sq mi (6.98 km^{2})
  - Water: 0.015 sq mi (0.04 km^{2})
- Elevation: 846 ft (258 m)

Population (2020)
  - Total: 3,963
  - Density: 1,470.1/sq mi (567.62/km^{2})
- Time zone: UTC-5 (Eastern (EST))
  - Summer (DST): UTC-4 (EDT)
- ZIP code: 28164
- Area code: 704
- FIPS code: 37-64500
- GNIS feature ID: 2406656
- Website: www.townofstanley.org

Stanley is a town in Gaston County, North Carolina, United States. As of the 2020 census, Stanley had a population of 3,963.

== Geography ==
According to the United States Census Bureau, the town has a total area of 2.7 square miles (7.0 km^{2}), of which 2.7 square miles (6.9 km^{2}) is land and 0.015 square miles (0.04 km^{2}), or 0.57%, is water. The 28164 zip code for Stanley extends north into unincorporated land as far as the southwestern corner of Lake Norman in Lincoln County.

== Demographics ==
Historical population
Census	Pop.	Note	%±
1900	441		—
1910	321		−27.2%
1920	584		81.9%
1930	1,084		85.6%
1940	1,036		−4.4%
1950	1,644		58.7%
1960	1,980		20.4%
1970	2,336		18.0%
1980	2,341		0.2%
1990	2,823		20.6%
2000	3,053		8.1%
2010	3,556		16.5%
2020	3,963		11.4%
U.S. Decennial Census

=== 2020 census ===
As of the 2020 census, Stanley had a population of 3,963. There were 1,555 households and 1,032 families residing in the town.

The median age was 41.6 years. 21.8% of residents were under the age of 18 and 20.2% of residents were 65 years of age or older. For every 100 females there were 88.8 males, and for every 100 females age 18 and over there were 85.1 males age 18 and over.

100.0% of residents lived in urban areas, while 0.0% lived in rural areas.

Of the town's households, 32.3% had children under the age of 18 living in them. 48.7% were married-couple households, 16.1% were households with a male householder and no spouse or partner present, and 28.6% were households with a female householder and no spouse or partner present. About 26.0% of all households were made up of individuals, and 12.5% had someone living alone who was 65 years of age or older.

There were 1,687 housing units, of which 7.8% were vacant. The homeowner vacancy rate was 2.1% and the rental vacancy rate was 5.4%.

Stanley racial composition
Race	Number	Percentage
White (non-Hispanic)	3,159	79.71%
Black or African American (non-Hispanic)	415	10.47%
Native American	16	0.4%
Asian	43	1.09%
Other/Mixed	178	4.49%
Hispanic or Latino	152	3.84%

=== 2000 census ===
As of the census of 2000, there were 3,053 people, 1,201 households, and 887 families residing in the town. The population density was 1,327.2 inhabitants per square mile (512.4/km^{2}). There were 1,303 housing units at an average density of 566.4 per square mile (218.7/km^{2}). The racial makeup of the town was 89.42% White, 8.42% African American, 0.39% Native American, 0.46% Asian, 0.03% Pacific Islander, 0.66% other races, and 0.62% from two or more races. Hispanic or Latino of any race comprised 0.82% of the population [United States Census, 2000].

There were 1,201 households, out of which 35.5% had children under the age of 18 living with them, 55.7% were married couples living together, 14.7% had a female householder with no husband present, and 26.1% were non-families. 23.1% of all households were made up of individuals, and 8.7% had someone living alone who was 65 years of age or older. The average household size was 2.54 and the average family size was 2.99.

In the town, the population was spread out, with 26.6% under the age of 18, 7.7% from 18 to 24, 32.2% from 25 to 44, 22.0% from 45 to 64, and 11.5% who were 65 years of age or older. The median age was 36 years. For every 100 females, there were 93.6 males. For every 100 females age 18 and over, there were 87.0 males.

The median income for a household in the town was $35,867, and the median income for a family was $39,914. Males had a median income of $36,932 versus $21,178 for females. The per capita income for the town was $17,403. About 9.0% of families and 10.6% of the population were below the poverty line, including 10.6% of those under age 18 and 9.3% of those age 65 or over.

== Education ==
Stanley has five public schools.

- Community Public Charter School
- Kiser Elementary School
- Springfield Elementary School
- Stanley Middle School
- East Gaston High School

The Stanley Branch of the Gaston County Public Library system serves this community.

== Notable people ==
- Ted Abernathy, former Major League Baseball pitcher
- James Forrester, member of the North Carolina Senate
- Doyt Morris, former Major League Baseball outfielder and first baseman
- John Torbett, member of the North Carolina House of Representatives
