= Cabot's Ice Cream and Restaurant =

Ice cream parlor in Massachusetts, United States

Coordinates: 42.3524250°N 71.2040047°W

- Type: Ice-cream parlor and restaurant
- Founded: 1969 (57 years ago)
- Headquarters: 743 Washington Street; Newtonville, Massachusetts, U.S.
- Number of locations: 1
- Owners: Kevin and Kay Masterson (since 2023)
- Website: www.cabots.com

Cabot's Ice Cream and Restaurant is an ice-cream parlor and restaurant in Newtonville, Massachusetts, United States. It was established in 1967, two years before it was purchased by the Prestejohn family, in whose hands it remained for 54 years. Joe Prestejohn, son of the original owners, Joseph (1923–1987) and Catherine (1921–2013), and his sister, Susan Lipsky, sold it in 2023 to Kevin and Kay Masterson, who own have owned Johnny's Luncheonette in Newton Centre since 2014. Around 60% of Cabot's revenue comes from food sales, with the balance made up by ice cream. The name of the business comes from the Cabot family of Boston.

The Prestejohns originally owned a bar and restaurant in Boston which burned down in 1958.

In 2023, the restaurant's 64-ounce frappes were featured on Good Morning America. In 2026, it was the subject of WBZ-TV's Small Business Shoutout.
