= Ross (steam automobile) =

Defunct American motor vehicle manufacturer

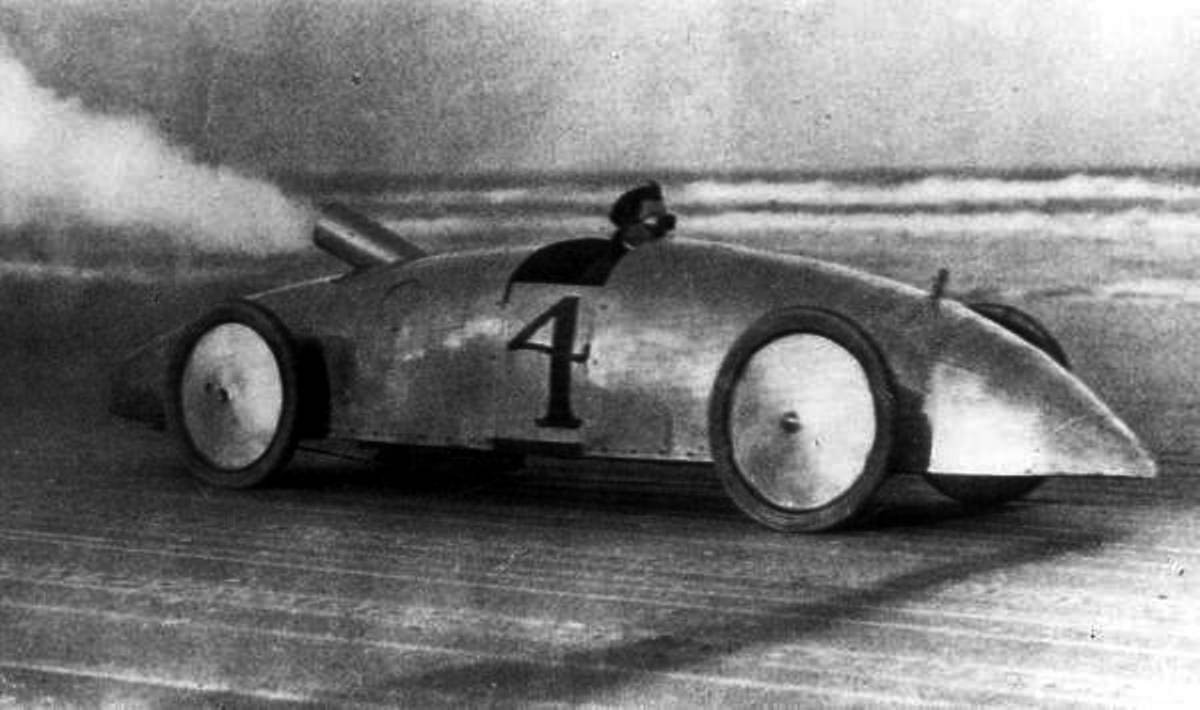
Louis Ross racing his "Wogglebug"

The Ross was a brass era steam automobile built in Newtonville, Massachusetts from 1906 to 1909.

== Louis Ross ==
Company founder Louis S. Ross (1877–1927) gained national fame in the early 1900s while an employee of Stanley Motor Carriage Company racing his own-design and own-built Stanley Steamer-powered "Wogglebug" race car at Ormond-Daytona Beach.

Ross's "Wogglebug" was powered by two steam engines. It is said the two engines independently powered a rear wheel and they had separate speed controls. Difficult to control it would go down the course moving from side to side. Nevertheless at Daytona matched against W K Vanderbilt's new 90 hp Mercedes and a 90 hp Napier, Ross's "Wogglebug" won "the one-mile championship of the world" and the Dewar Trophy.

He was one of the first American drivers to complete a mile course in under one minute. In 1906 he gave up racing to turn his attention full-time to automobile manufacturing. Ross closed his steam car business in 1911 and focused on the manufacture of torpedo signals used by railroads. On June 10, 1927 he was killed in an explosion while testing a new torpedo of his own design.

== Ross Steamer ==
The company produced a 25 hp two-cylinder, shaft-driven model that was the first steam-powered car to have the boiler, engine, and tanks all up front under the hood. The five-passenger touring car weighed 2800 pounds and cost $2800.

== See also ==
- Louis S. Ross at the VirtualSteamMuseum.org
- Steam car
- Steam engine
- Timeline of steam power
- List of defunct United States automobile manufacturers
