= Blas Monaco =

American baseball player (1915–2000)

- Second baseman
- Born: November 16, 1915; San Antonio, Texas, U.S.
- Died: February 10, 2000 (aged 84); San Antonio, Texas, U.S.
- Batted: Right Threw: Right

MLB debut
- August 18, 1937, for the Cleveland Indians

Last MLB appearance
- May 22, 1946, for the Cleveland Indians

MLB statistics
- Batting average: .154
- Home runs: 0
- Runs batted in: 2
- Stats at Baseball Reference

Teams
- Cleveland Indians (1937, 1946)

Blas Monaco (November 16, 1915 – February 10, 2000) was an American professional baseball player who had a long career (1935–1944; 1946–1949) in minor league baseball interrupted by two brief Major League trials almost nine years apart with the Cleveland Indians in 1937 and 1946. The native of San Antonio, Texas, an infielder, threw and batted right-handed, stood 5 feet 11 inches (1.80 m) tall and weighed 170 pounds (77 kg).

== Career ==
Monaco appeared in only 17 games in the Major Leagues, and collected two hits in 13 at bats, with one extra-base hit, a triple, and two runs batted in. His two hits and lone RBI came in his big league debut on August 18, 1937, at Sportsman's Park against the St. Louis Browns. In that game, Monaco pinch hit for starting second baseman John Kroner and went two-for-two and played errorless ball in the field, in an 11–6 Cleveland defeat. He would go hitless in his remaining 11 MLB at bats (five in 1937 and six in 1946), starting his only game as a second baseman four days after his debut, and going 0-for-4 against Vern Kennedy of the Chicago White Sox. However, he again made no errors in the game, which was won by the Indians, 3–2.

During his minor league career, Monaco played in over 1,400 games.
