= Greenlawn Cemetery (Nahant, Massachusetts) =

Historic cemetery in Massachusetts, United States

- U.S. National Register of Historic Places
- U.S. Historic district
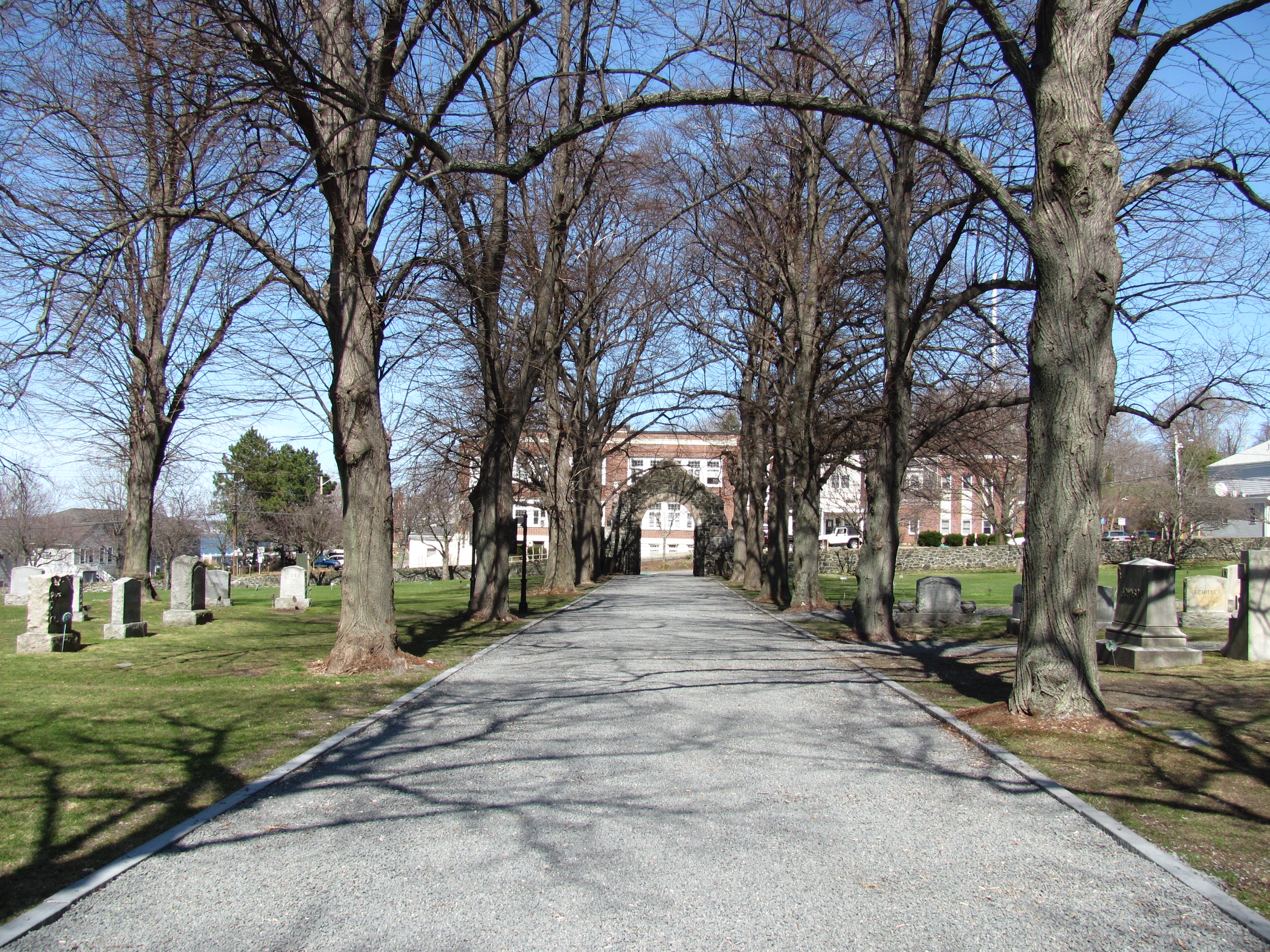
- Greenlawn Cemetery

- Location within Massachusetts Location within the United States
- Location: 195 Nahant Road, Nahant, Massachusetts
- Coordinates: 42°25′37″N 70°55′41″W
- Area: 3.9 acres (1.6 ha)
- Built: 1856
- Architect: Cram and Ferguson; Connick, Charles J.
- Architectural style: Late Gothic Revival
- NRHP reference No.: 00000481
- Added to NRHP: May 11, 2000

Greenlawn Cemetery is a historic cemetery at 195 Nahant Road in Nahant, Massachusetts. Development of the 5.7-acre (2.3 ha) cemetery was one of the first civic projects of the town of Nahant after its separation from adjacent Lynn in 1853. The cemetery was established in 1856 on two acres (0.81 ha) of land, and has been extended several times to its present size. Its dominant feature is the Ellingwood Chapel, a Gothic Revival structure built in 1920. A 3.9-acre (1.6 ha) portion of the cemetery was listed on the National Register of Historic Places in 2000.

== Description and history ==
The town of Nahant occupies a narrow peninsula that juts south of Cape Ann from the city of Lynn, to which it is connected by a natural sand causeway. Greenlawn Cemetery is located in western Nahant, on the south side of Nahant Road, the major east-west road through the town. It is bordered on the road by a stone wall, with the Francis H. Johnson Gate at its center providing the principal access. The lane runs southerly, bisecting the cemetery to a circle near the southern boundary where the Veterans Memorial Obelisk is located; from here a lane runs east to the Louise Beal Memorial Gateway at its southeast corner. The cemetery is bisected east-west by a tree-lined lane extending west from the main lane, and by the Ellingwood Chapel to the east.

Nahant was originally settled as part of Lynn, and was largely agrarian until the mid-19th century, when summer resort development began to take place in its eastern half. The town was separated from Lynn in 1853, and the creation of a town cemetery was an early subject of discussion at town meetings. The oldest portion of Greenlawn Cemetery, a 2-acre (0.81 ha) parcel roughly encompassing the present cemetery's southern half, was acquired in 1856. A receiving tomb was built the same year, and the first burial took place in 1857. The Soldiers Memorial was dedicated in 1866 to the community's American Civil War dead. By 1918 further land acquisitions had given the cemetery most of its present configuration, and Ellingwood Chapel was built in 1920, to a design by the architectural firm of Cram and Ferguson. It was funded by Mary Johnson, in honor of her late husband's parents, Joseph Johnson, Jr. and Joanna Ellingwood Johnson.

== See also ==
- National Register of Historic Places listings in Essex County, Massachusetts
