= Alice Standish Allen =

American engineering geologist

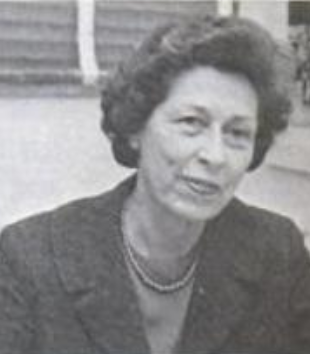
- Alice S. Allen, from a 1966 publication of the United States Army
- Born: 1907; Boston, Massachusetts, U.S.
- Died: April 5, 2002 (aged 94–95)
- Occupation: Geological engineer

Alice Standish Allen (1907 – April 5, 2002) was the first female engineering geologist in North America. Born in Boston, Massachusetts, Allen was raised in the nearby village of Newtonville, Massachusetts, then in Lexington, Massachusetts. She studied geology at a number of institutions, including Mount Holyoke College, Wisconsin University, and Northwestern University. Allen worked as an engineering geologist for the entirety of her professional career for the United States government in Washington, D.C. until her retirement in 1982.

== Personal life ==
Allen was born in 1907 in Boston and was brought up in the nearby communities of Newtonville, and later on, Lexington. Apart from her geological career, she was also an avid piano player. She taught Sunday School at the Fourth Church of Christ in Washington, D.C., the city in which she spent her entire career. After retiring from the U.S Bureau of Mines in 1982, she moved into a local retirement community where she eventually died of heart failure on April 5, 2002, at the age of 94.

== Education ==
Allen began her academic career while attending Mount Holyoke College in South Hadley, Massachusetts, where she obtained a Bachelor of Arts degree in geology. Subsequently, she earned her Master of Arts degree in geology at Wisconsin University in 1931, while maintaining a job as a secretary on campus. Continuing her education, she worked as an assistant during the duration of her studies at Northwestern University from 1931 to 1936.

== Career ==
Commencing her professional career in 1936, Allen worked as a geological engineer for U. S. government in Washington, D.C., undertaking work at the U.S Geological Survey (USGS). She was a member of multiple institutions, including the USGS Military Geology Unit (MGU) where she was one of the first affiliated members in 1942. Her role at MGU contained analysis and creation of topographic products. These commodities were used by the American forces during World War I war and invoked critical and diplomatic planning. The topographic products depicted trafficability of vehicles, military dominance given the terrain, drafting of assault locations and establishing safe water sites for combat units.

Following the war, Allen, along with much of the MGU, was transferred to the Engineering Geology Branch (EGB) where she served as the interim representative and spokesperson. The role of the EGB was to provide geological advice to federal agencies and any inquiring public offices. When the EGB moved the center of its operations to Denver, Colorado in 1946, Allen was appointed the Washington D.C. representative and her responsibilities were to correspond with inquiring agencies on a daily basis as well as to complete tasks as assigned by the Denver office. It was at EGB that she recognized that the geological concerns of many large American cities were being neglected. Under her direction, at least one experienced geologist established an office in all major American cities such as Los Angeles, San Francisco, and Seattle. Allen's program operated successfully for 20 years before it began to be neglected; by this time Allen had left the EGB. Eventually, the EGB was dissolved in 1978.

After leaving EGB, Allen joined the Extraterrestrial Research Agency at the Office of the Chief of Engineers. She brought engineering geological sense to the United States Army's pre-NASA program to create a lunar-face geomorphologic map. Allen was recognized for her accomplishment in 1968 with a Superior Performance Commendation. Upon completion in 1971, the entirety of the Army's lunar geology program was transferred to NASA.

For the latter part of her geological career, Allen worked with the United States Bureau of Mines where she studied the environmental impacts of mine subsidence. She put together a highly successful effort (the Mesabi Project) to locate, map, and characterize subsidence-impacted land. This project focused on former mine districts in Minnesota, north-eastern Pennsylvania, Iowa, and Missouri. Allen's work on this project earned her the Interior Department Meritorious Service Award.

== Awards ==
- In 1968, Alice Allen was the recipient of the Superior Performance Commendation for her assistance within the assemblage of lunar maps for the United States governments pre-NASA programs.
- She earned the Interior Department's Meritorious Service Award for her work on the Mesabi Project.
- For her work on Basic Questions Concerning Coal Mine Subsidence in the United States, she was given a publication award by the Association of Engineering Geologists in 1979.
- Although not an award, she was elected as an Honorary Member of the Geological Society of America in 1987 for her professional activities over the decades.
