= Doyt Morris =

American baseball player (1916-1984)

- Morris in 1937
- Outfielder
- Born: July 15, 1916; Stanley, North Carolina, U.S.
- Died: July 4, 1984 (aged 67); Gastonia, North Carolina, U.S.
- Batted: Right Threw: Right

MLB debut
- June 6, 1937, for the Philadelphia Athletics

Last MLB appearance
- September 22, 1937, for the Philadelphia Athletics

MLB statistics
- Batting average: .154
- Home runs: 0
- Runs batted in: 0
- Stats at Baseball Reference

Teams
- Philadelphia Athletics (1937)

Doyt Theodore Morris (July 15, 1916 – July 4, 1984) was a professional baseball outfielder and first baseman. He played six games for the 1937 Philadelphia Athletics of Major League Baseball (MLB). Listed at 6 feet 4 inches (1.93 m) and 195 pounds (88 kg), he batted and threw right-handed.

== Biography ==
Morris attended Wake Forest University, where he played college baseball and college basketball. He then played a total of 391 games in minor league baseball during 1937, 1938, 1939, and 1941. He primarily played as a first baseman in the minor leagues, with some appearances at third base and in the outfield.

In 1937, Morris appeared in six games with the major league Philadelphia Athletics. He had a .154 batting average (2-for-13), without a home run or RBI. Both of his hits were singles in games against the Chicago White Sox; the first off of Bill Dietrich on June 7, and the second off of Thornton Lee on September 22. Defensively, Morris played two games in left field and one game in center field, without committing an error.

Born in Stanley, North Carolina, in 1916, Morris died in 1984 in Gastonia, North Carolina, 11 days before his 68th birthday. After his baseball career, he had worked for Duke Power Company; he was survived by his wife and a son and a daughter.
