= Church of the Open Word (Newton, Massachusetts) =

Coordinates: 42°20′58.9″N 71°12′27.7″W

- U.S. Historic district – Contributing property
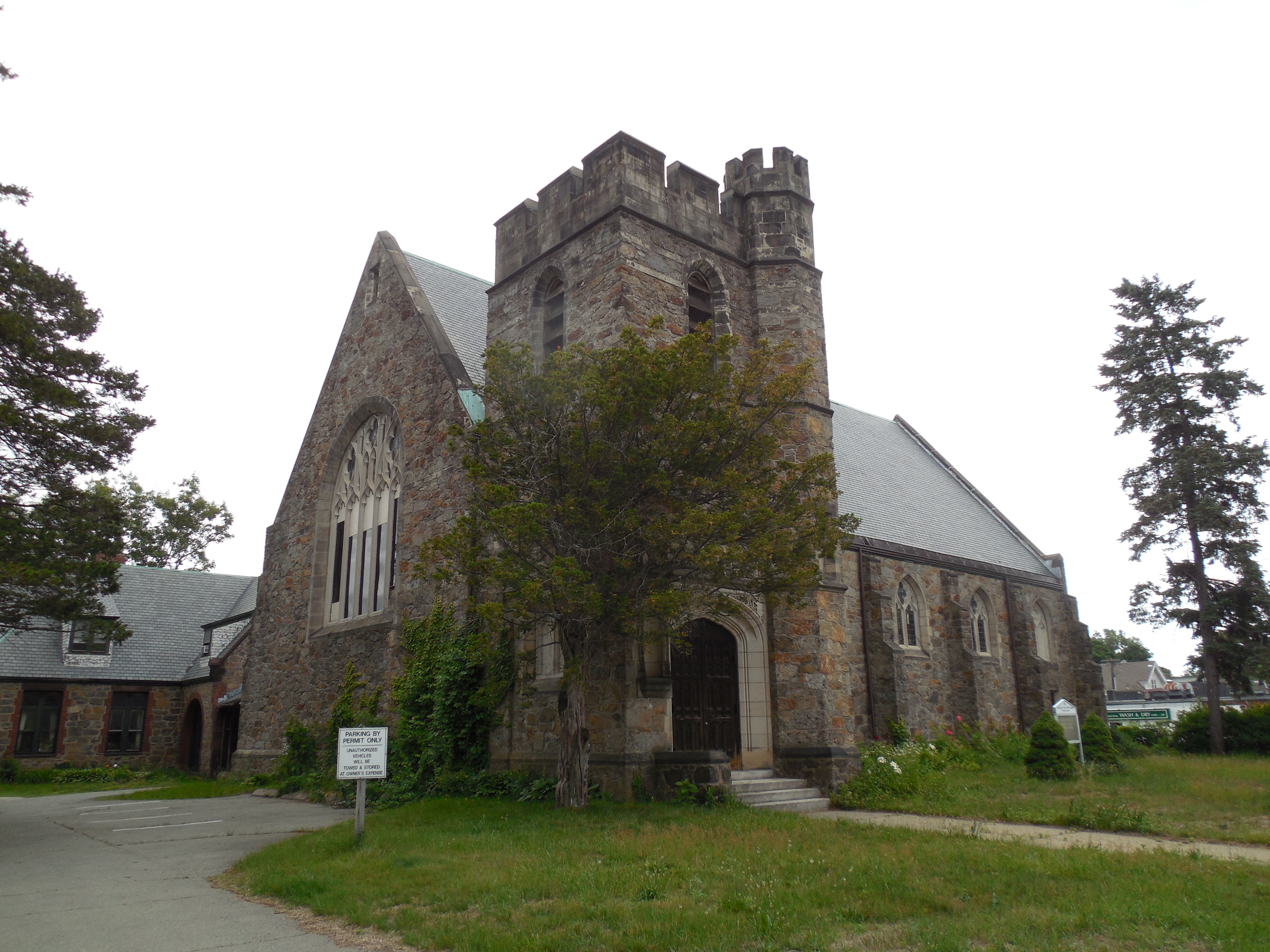
- Church of the Open Word

- Location within Massachusetts Location within the United States
- Location: Newton, Massachusetts
- Built: 1893
- Architectural style: Gothic Revival
- Part of: Newtonville Historic District (ID86001753)

The Church of the Open Word is a historic Swedenborgian church building located at 19 Highland Avenue in the village of Newtonville, in Newton, Massachusetts. The congregation was organized in 1860 and a wooden chapel was erected on the rear of this property. The stone Gothic Revival building was erected on the front of the property in 1893. The church closed in 2020, and in 2026 a proposal to redevelop the building into condominiums was approved by the city.

The building is a contributing property in the Newtonville Historic District, which was added to the National Register of Historic Places on September 4, 1986.

== See also ==
- National Register of Historic Places listings in Newton, Massachusetts
