= Percy G. Stiles =

American physiologist and writer

Percy Goldthwait Stiles
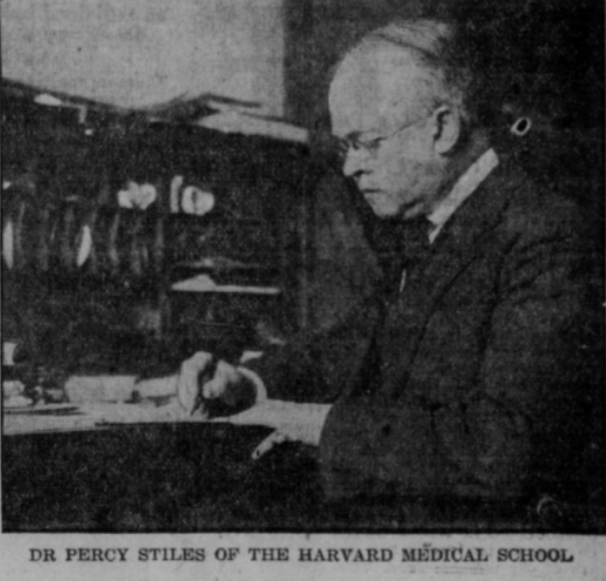
- Born: July 1, 1875; Newtonville, Massachusetts
- Died: July 5, 1936 (aged 61)
- Occupations: Physiologist, writer

Percy Goldthwait Stiles (July 1, 1875 – July 5, 1936) was an American physiologist and writer.

== Biography ==
Stiles was born in Newtonville, Massachusetts. He graduated B.S. from Massachusetts Institute of Technology in 1897. He obtained a PhD in physiology from Johns Hopkins University in 1902. He was instructor in physiology at the University and Bellevue Hospital Medical College in 1903. From 1903-1917 he was instructor of physiology at the Institute of Technology in Boston.

He joined the Department of Physiology at Harvard Medical School as a teacher in 1913 and held the title of instructor from 1913–1916. He was an Assistant Professor of Physiology for the next twenty years. He authored several medical works; Human Physiology, Nutritional Physiology and The Nervous System and its Conservation. Stiles was a member of the American Physiological Society and the American Association for the Advancement of Science.

Stiles most well known work Human Physiology went through many editions and was positively reviewed in science journals. The textbook was recommended as immense value to students and teachers of physiology.

He took an interest in researching dreams and authored a book on the topic in 1927.

== Selected publications ==
- Theories of Sleep (1903)
- Nutritional Physiology (1912)
- The Nervous System and Its Conservation (1914)
- Wayfaring in New England (1920)
- An Adequate Diet (1916)
- Human Physiology: A Text-Book for High Schools and Colleges (1917)
- Dreams (1927)
