= Claflin School =

- U.S. National Register of Historic Places
- U.S. Historic district – Contributing property
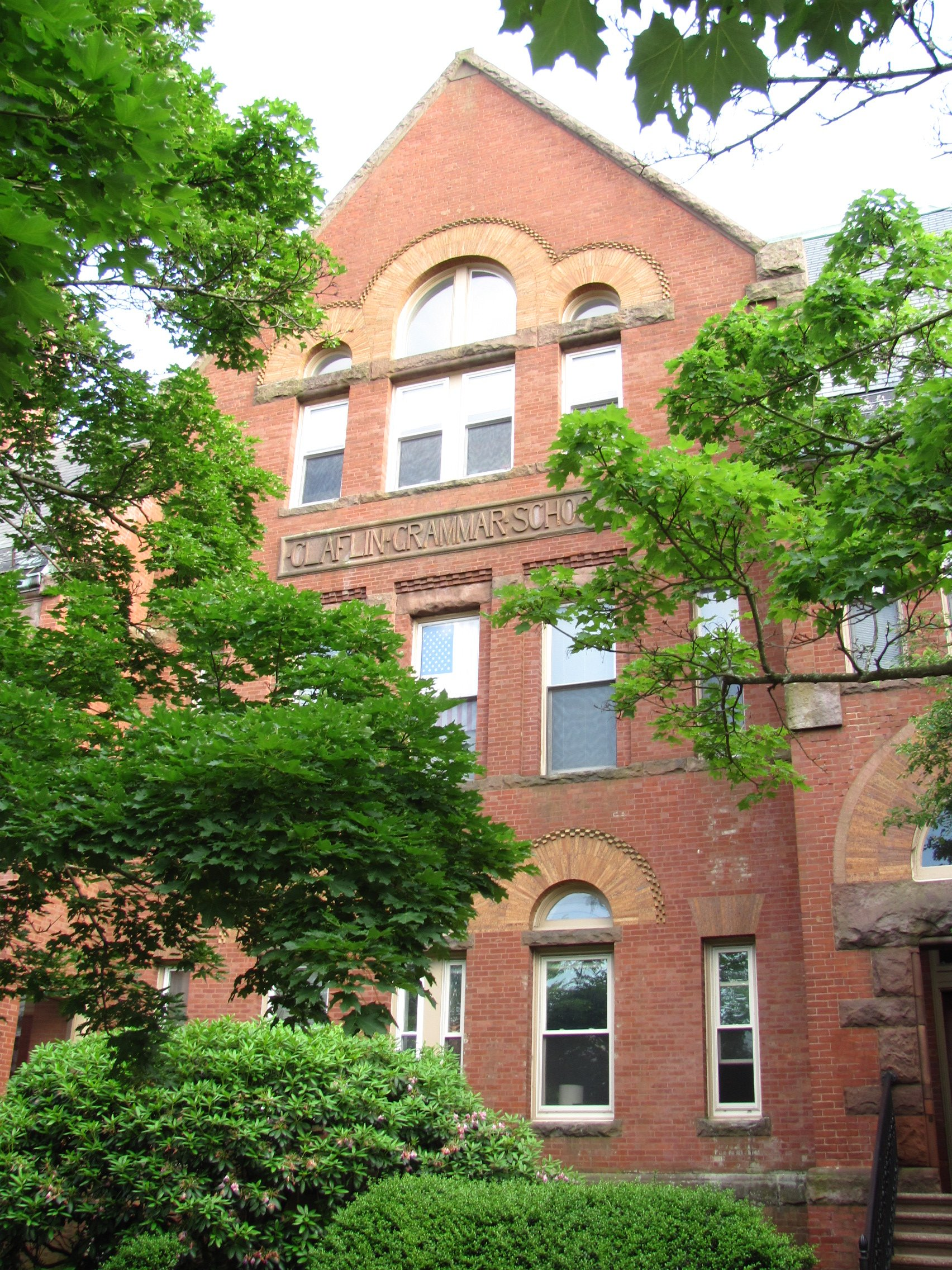
- Claflin Grammar School

- Location within Massachusetts Location within the United States
- Location: 110–112 Washington Park, Newton, Massachusetts
- Coordinates: 42°20′56″N 71°12′24″W
- Area: 1.5 acres (0.61 ha)
- Built: 1891
- Architect: J. Merrill Brown
- Architectural style: Gothic, Richardsonian Romanesque
- Part of: Newtonville Historic District (ID90000014)
- NRHP reference No.: 84002543

Significant dates
- Added to NRHP: August 16, 1984
- Designated CP: September 4, 1986

The Claflin School is a historic former school building at 110–112 Washington Park, Newtonville, Massachusetts. It is a 2 1/2-story brick building, with a tall hip roof, projecting side-gabled wings, and a tall central gable section. The main facade is symmetrically arranged, with brick quoining around windows and corners, and entrances set in round-arch openings. Named for William Claflin, it was built in 1891, and is a well-preserved example of Richardsonian Romanesque design. Its architect was Merrill J. Brown.

The building was listed in the National Register of Historic Places on September 16, 1984, and included in the Newtonville Historic District in 1986.

A new elementary school was named for William Claflin in 1953 but closed in the 1980s. The Lowell Avenue building became artist studios and a small park.

== See also ==
- National Register of Historic Places listings in Newton, Massachusetts
