= John Whitehead (baseball) =

American baseball player (1909–1964)

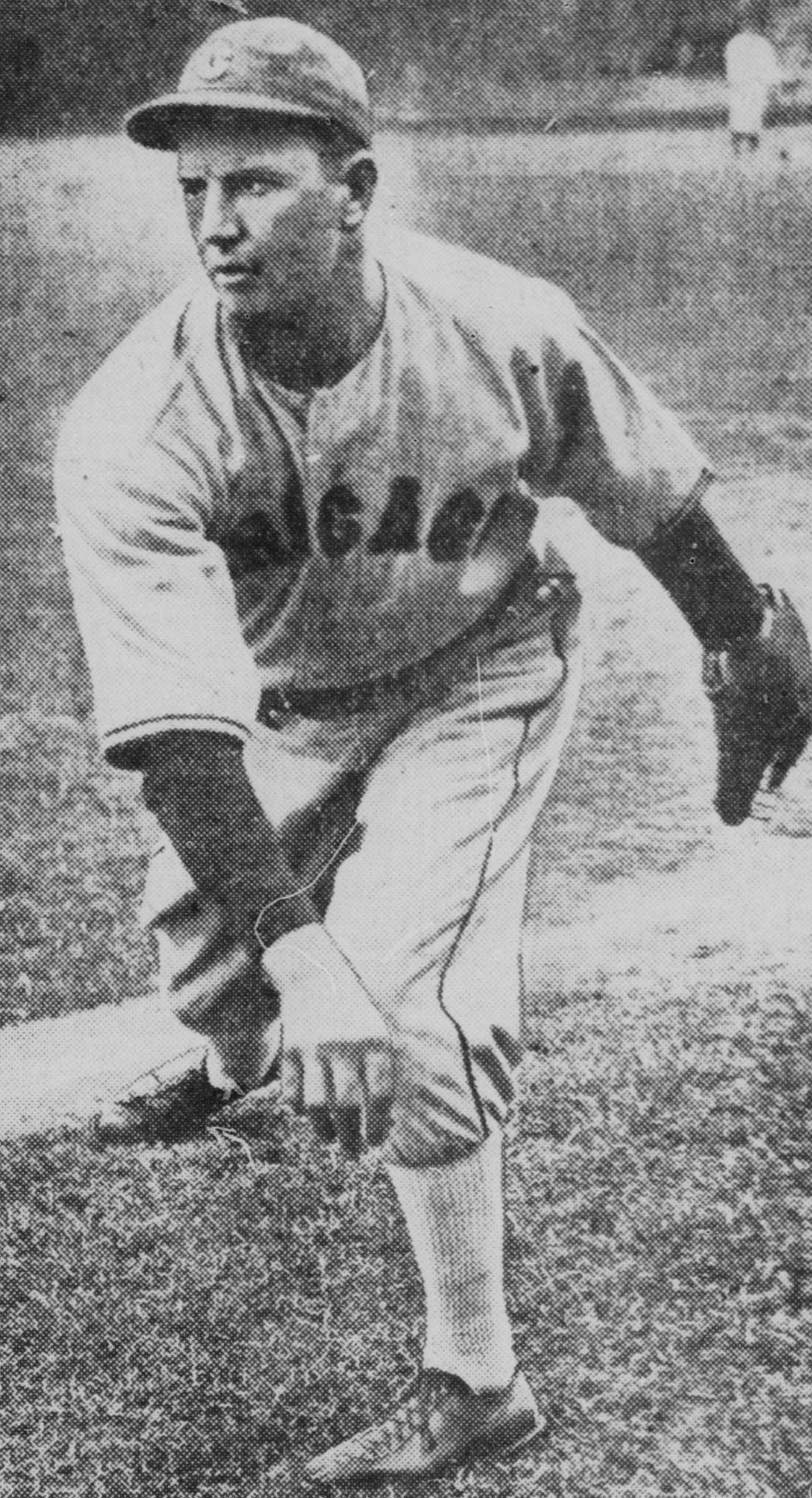
- Whitehead, circa 1935
- Pitcher
- Born: April 27, 1909; Coleman, Texas, U.S.
- Died: October 20, 1964 (aged 55); Bonham, Texas, U.S.
- Batted: Right Threw: Right

MLB debut
- April 19, 1935, for the Chicago White Sox

Last MLB appearance
- May 13, 1942, for the St. Louis Browns

MLB statistics
- Win–loss record: 49–54
- Earned run average: 4.60
- Strikeouts: 254
- Stats at Baseball Reference

Teams
- Chicago White Sox (1935–1939); St. Louis Browns (1939–1940, 1942)

John Henderson Whitehead (April 27, 1909 – October 20, 1964) was an American professional baseball pitcher in Major League Baseball with the Chicago White Sox and St. Louis Browns between 1935 and 1942. Whitehead batted and threw right-handed. He was born in Coleman, Texas.
