= Jackie Hayes (second baseman) =

American baseball player (1906–1983)

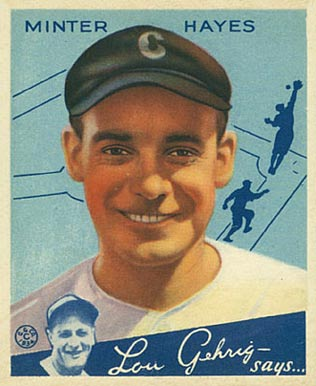
- Hayes on a 1934 Goudey baseball card
- Second baseman
- Born: July 19, 1906; Clanton, Alabama, U.S.
- Died: February 9, 1983 (aged 76); Birmingham, Alabama, U.S.
- Batted: Right Threw: Right

MLB debut
- August 5, 1927, for the Washington Senators

Last MLB appearance
- August 29, 1940, for the Chicago White Sox

MLB statistics
- Batting average: .265
- Home runs: 20
- Runs batted in: 493
- Stats at Baseball Reference

Teams
- Washington Senators (1927–1931); Chicago White Sox (1932–1940)

Minter Carney "Jackie" Hayes (July 19, 1906 – February 9, 1983) was an American professional baseball second baseman who played in Major League Baseball for the Washington Senators (1927–1931) and Chicago White Sox (1932–1940).

== Early life and career ==
Hayes was born in Clanton, Alabama. The right-handed graduate of the University of Alabama made his debut on August 5, 1927. In his first full season, he batted a solid .276 with 2 home runs and 57 RBIs in 424 at bats. From there, Hayes went on to be a contributing part of the Senators in the late 1920s, and then the White Sox through the '30s. In his career, he was in the top five in sacrifice hits twice.

== Baseball career highlights ==
In a 14-season career, he batted .265 with 20 homers and 493 runs batted in, in 1091 games. He accumulated 34 stolen bases, 494 runs, 196 doubles and a .318 on-base percentage. He had 1069 career hits in 4040 at bats.

He became the first player in Major League Baseball to wear a batting helmet during a game.

== Later life ==
During Spring training 1940, Hayes lost sight in one of his eyes, and legend has it that this was after a piece of cinder hit him in the eye during a game. Hayes was quoted at the time as both thinking a cinder had infiltrated his eye, and that he must have gotten soap in his right eye, but it was actually glaucoma. He later lost sight in both eyes. Hayes died at age 76 in Birmingham, Alabama, and was interred at Clanton's cemetery.
