= Masonic Building (Newton, Massachusetts) =

Coordinates: 42°21′2.3″N 71°12′24.7″W

- U.S. Historic district – Contributing property
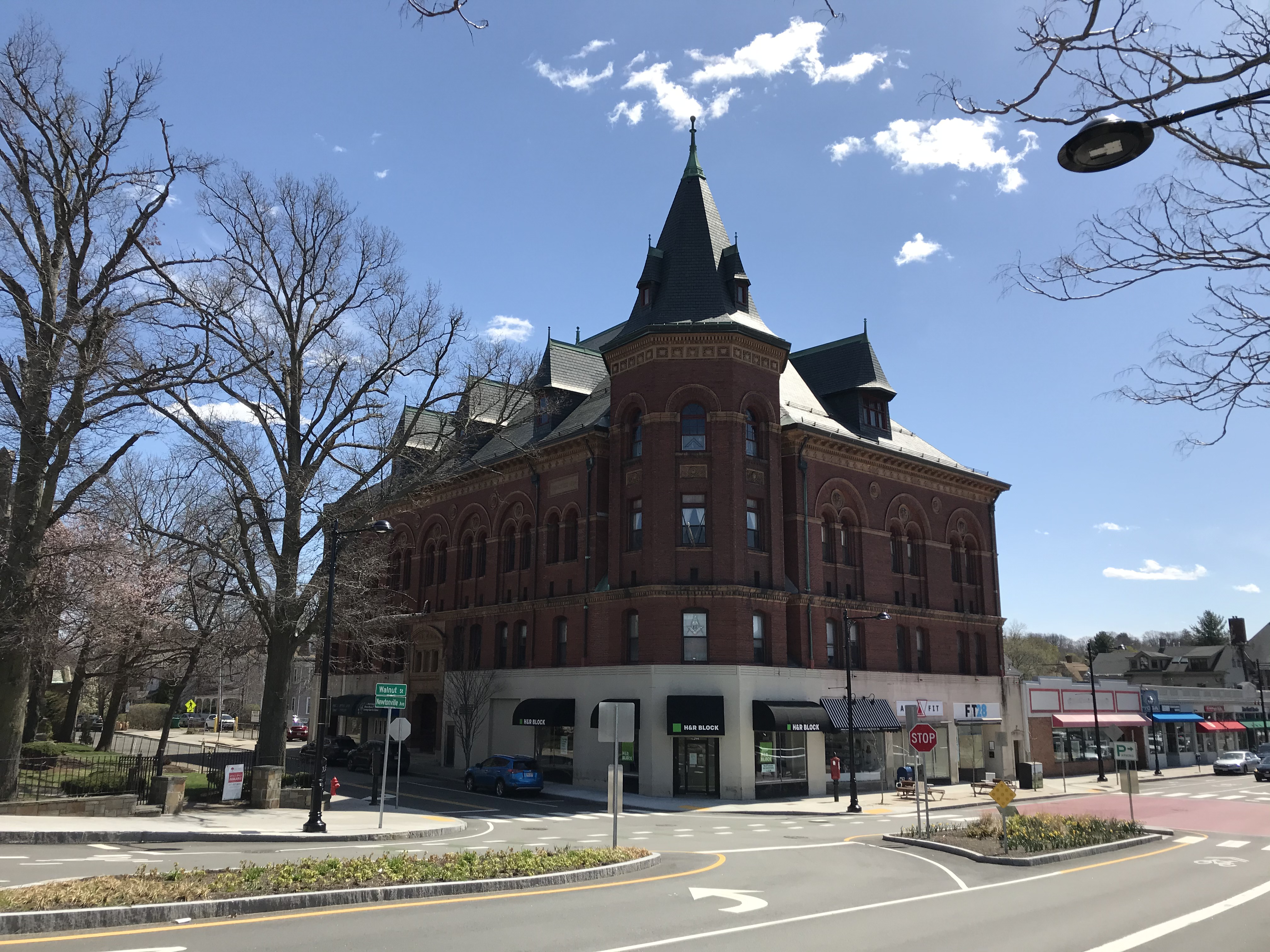
- Masonic Building

- Location within Massachusetts Location within the United States
- Location: Newton, Massachusetts
- Built: 1896
- Architect: Hartwell and Richardson
- Architectural style: Renaissance
- Part of: Newtonville Historic District (ID90000014)
- MPS: Newton MRA
- Designated CP: February 6, 1990

The Masonic Building, located at 296 to 304 Walnut Street and 456 to 460 Newtonville Avenue in the village of Newtonville, in Newton, Massachusetts in the United States, is a historic building built in 1896 as a Masonic Lodge hall. It is a massive four-story redbrick Renaissance-style building with a turret on the corner and a steep slate pyramid roof. The upper floors are still used for meetings of Masonic lodges and appendant orders, while the lower floors are used for retail and office purposes. The building was approved for listing on the National Register of Historic Places in 1986, but due to owner objection it was not listed. However, it was included as a contributing property to the Newtonville Historic District when that district was expanded in 1990.

== See also ==
- National Register of Historic Places listings in Newton, Massachusetts
- Masonic Building (disambiguation)
