= Italo Chelini =

American baseball player (1914–1972)

- Pitcher
- Born: October 10, 1914; San Francisco, California, U.S.
- Died: August 25, 1972 (aged 57); San Francisco, California, U.S.
- Batted: Left Threw: Left

MLB debut
- September 12, 1935, for the Chicago White Sox

Last MLB appearance
- May 13, 1937, for the Chicago White Sox

MLB statistics
- Win–loss record: 4–4
- Earned run average: 5.83
- Strikeouts: 20
- Stats at Baseball Reference

Teams
- Chicago White Sox (1935–1937)

Italo Vincent Chelini (October 10, 1914 – August 25, 1972), nicknamed "Chilly", was an American professional baseball pitcher in Major League Baseball. He played for the Chicago White Sox from 1935 to 1937.
