= Newtonville Historic District =

Historic district in Massachusetts, United States

- U.S. National Register of Historic Places
- U.S. Historic district
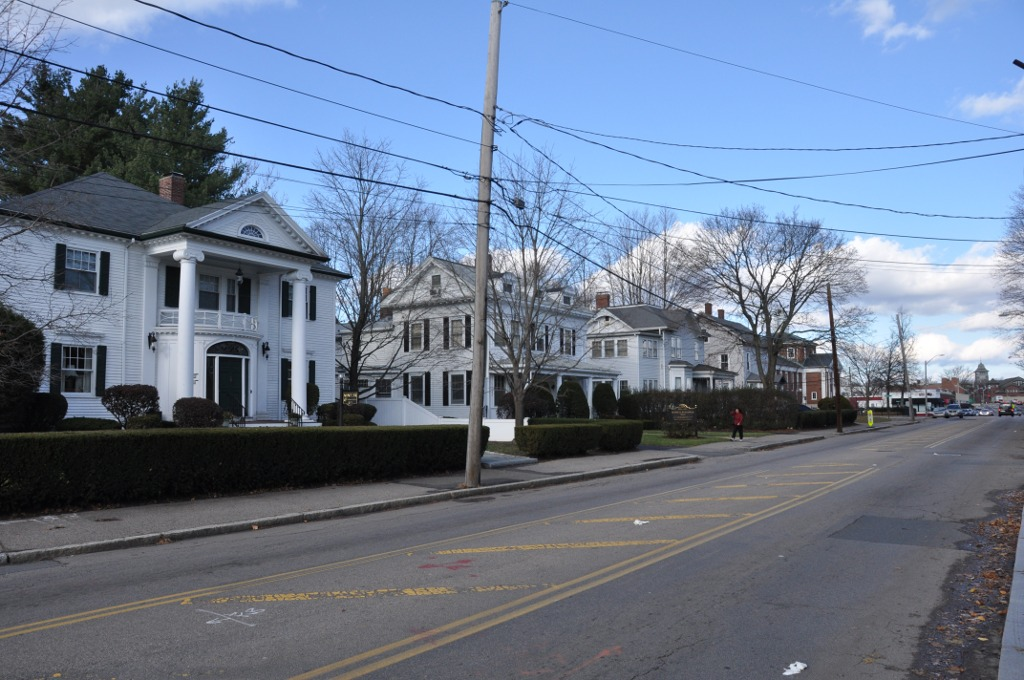
- Walnut Street in Newtonville

- Location within Massachusetts Location within the United States
- Location: Newton, Massachusetts
- Coordinates: 42.34804°N 71.20668°W
- Area: 40.5 acres (16.4 ha) (original); 7.8 acres (3.2 ha) (1990 increase)
- Architect: Brown, Samuel J.; Et al.
- Architectural style: Colonial Revival, Greek Revival, Late Victorian
- MPS: Newton MRA
- NRHP reference No.: 86001753 (original); 90000014 (increase)

Significant dates
- Added to NRHP: September 04, 1986
- Boundary increase: February 6, 1990

The Newtonville Historic District is a historic district in the village of Newtonville, in Newton, Massachusetts. The district encompasses the southern portion of the village's business district (south of the railroad tracks), as well as surrounding residential areas. It was listed on the National Register of Historic Places in 1986, and enlarged in 1990.

== Description and history ==
The village of Newtonville is located in central Newton, bounded on the north by Massachusetts Route 16 and on the south by Commonwealth Avenue (Massachusetts Route 30). Its central business district is centered on the junction of Walnut and Washington Streets, with the Massachusetts Turnpike and the MBTA commuter railroad tracks running east-west and roughly bisecting it. The residential part of the historic district encompasses an area with a high concentration of Victorian-era houses south of the business district, as well as the southern portion of the business district on Walnut Street. When it was first listed on the National Register of Historic Places in 1986, the district had two major sections. The first section consisted of Highland and Otis Streets, between Lowell Ave. and Walnut Street, including properties on Lowell, but excluding properties on Walnut St. north of Cabot Street. The second portion consisted of Walnut Street between Cabot Street and Dexter Avenue, excluding Newton North High School and including most of Clyde Street east of Walnut. In 1990 its boundaries were increased to include Birch Hill Road south of Highland, additional houses on Lowell Street, and the business district on Walnut Street south of the railroad tracks.

Newtonville was relatively undeveloped in the mid-19th century, despite the presence of the railroad. In the 1850s William Claflin acquired a large estate (formerly belonging to William Hull, now largely the site of Newton North High School) and began to develop and promote the area, with its major period of development taking place between about 1880 and 1900. The Claflin Block (1874) was the area's first major commercial building, and Claflin also built a number of handsome Victorian houses along Walnut Street as speculative ventures. The Claflin School, separately listed on the National Register, was built through his efforts. The business district was harmed by the widening of Washington Street and depression of the railroad right-of-way, as well as the construction of the Massachusetts Turnpike, which resulted in the demolition of Newtonville's 1880 station, and the division of the business district.

The Newtonville Branch Library, now the Newton Senior Center, is a significant contributing structure within the Historic District. The largest of Newton's branch libraries, it was designed in the classical revival style by architect E. Donald Robb of Robb and Little. The central pedimented pavillon of the brick structure has a cupola rising above the third floor. Flanking on both sides are wings with large double-hung windows. The stained glass medallions in the windows at the north and south gable ends of the original reading room were designed by Charles Jay Connick, a nationally known artist and a Newtonville resident, living at 90 Hull Street. Poet Robert Frost, a friend of Connick's, attended the dedication of the building in 1939 and read his poem Mending Wall, the opening line of which Connick incorporated into one of the windows.

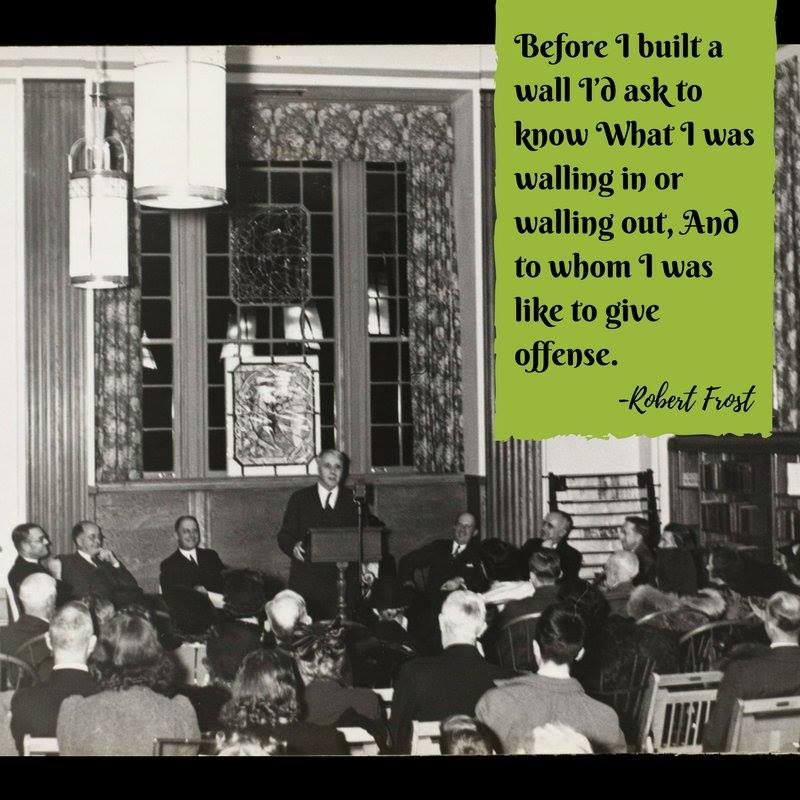
Robert Frost at Newtonville Library Dedication 1939

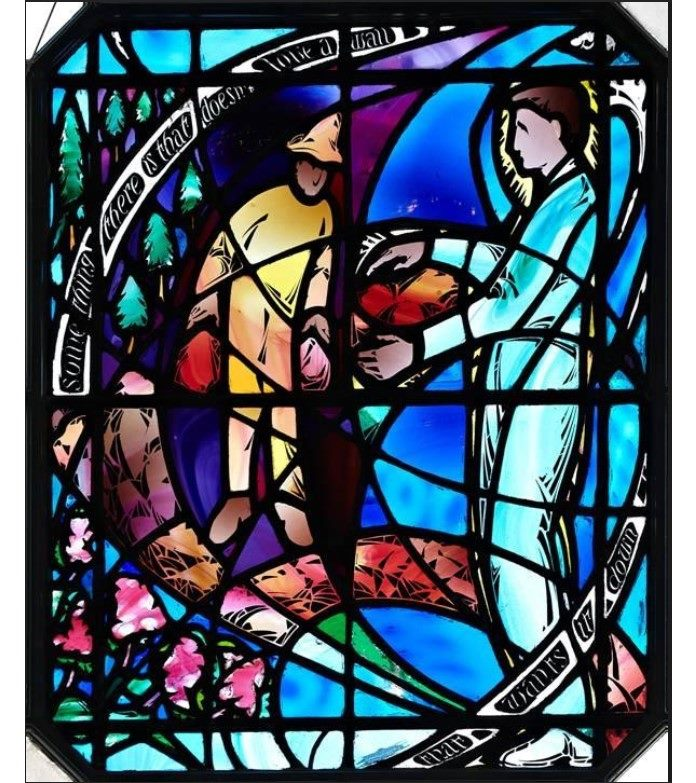
Window at Newtonville Branch Library (1939) by artist Charles Jay Connick with line from Robert Frost's poem

== Contributing properties ==
Contributing properties in the district include:

- The Claflin School (1891), which is also separately listed
- Church of the Open Word (1893)
- First Church of Christ, Scientist (1940)
- The Masonic Building (1896), a City of Newton designated Local Landmark
- The Newtonville Branch Library (1938)

== See also ==
- National Register of Historic Places listings in Newton, Massachusetts
