= Charles Jay Connick =

American painter (1875–1945)

Charles Jay Connick (1875–1945) was a prominent American painter, muralist, and designer best known for his work in stained glass in the Gothic Revival style. Born in Springboro, Pennsylvania, Connick eventually settled in the Boston area where he opened his studio in 1913. Connick's work is contained in many preeminent churches and chapels, including examples in Boston, Chicago, Detroit, New York City, Pittsburgh, San Francisco, Seattle, and Washington, D.C. He also authored the book Adventures in Light and Color in 1937. Connick's studio continued to operate, and remained a leading producer of stained glass, until 1986.

== Life ==
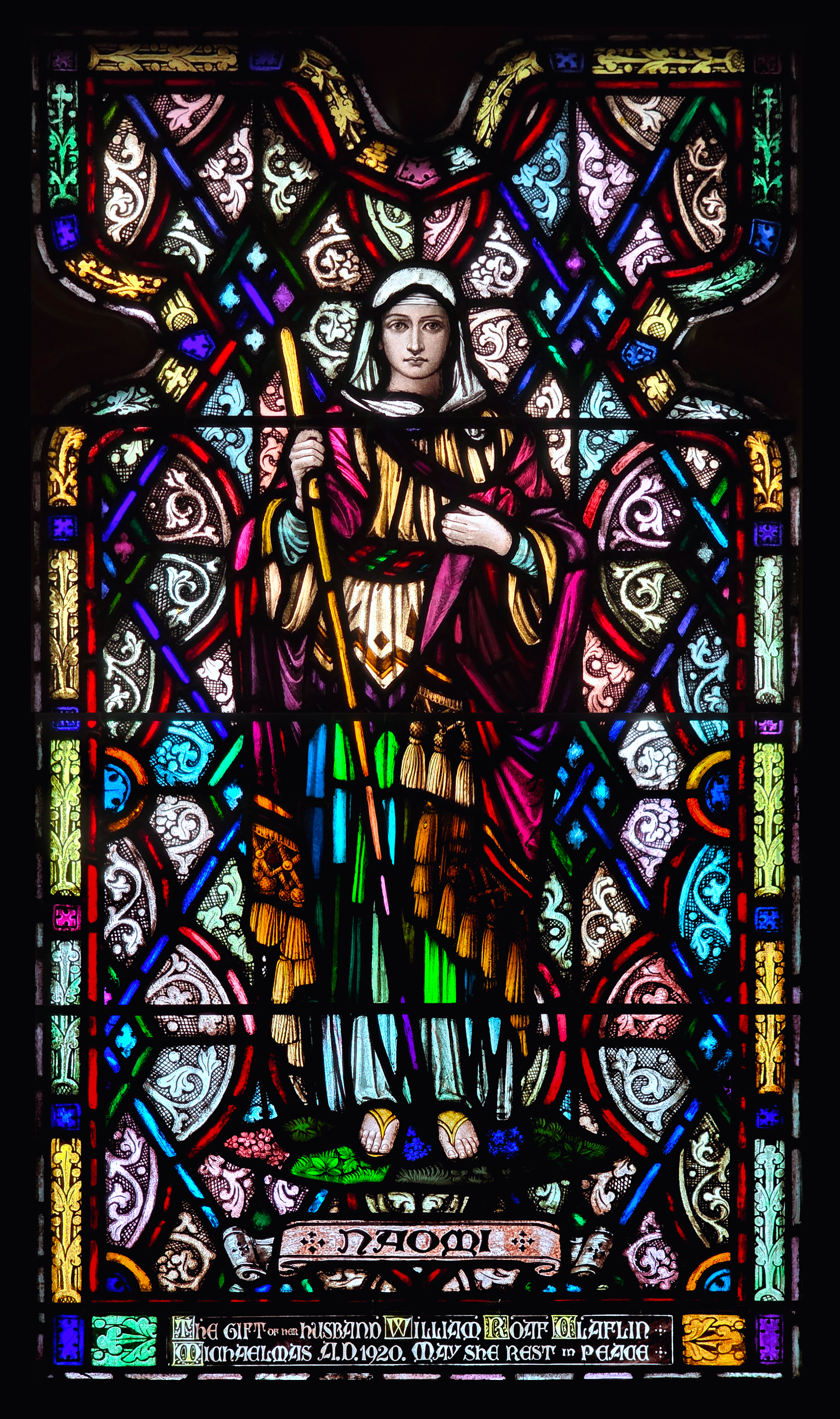
Naomi Window at All Saints Ashmont in Brookline

Born in Springboro in Crawford County, Pennsylvania, on September 27, 1875, Connick moved with his family to Pittsburgh when he was eight years old. Bullied by city children who made fun of his countrified attire, Connick would stay indoors during recess and draw with crayons, and thereby developed an interest in drawing and color at a young age. When obligated to leave high school when his father was disabled, he became an illustrator on the staff of the Pittsburgh Press.

Charles Jay Connick
- Charles Connick at work circa 1945
- Born: September 27, 1875; Springboro, Pennsylvania
- Died: December 28, 1945 (aged 70)
- Known for: Stained glass, painting, writer
- Movement: Gothic Revival
- Awards: Gold Medal at the Panama-Pacific International Exposition

At the age of 19, Connick became apprenticed in the production of stained glass windows at the shop of Rudy Brothers in Pittsburgh, where he stayed through 1899. He left for work in Boston for two years, returning to Pittsburgh in 1903 and worked for a number of stained-glass companies both in Pittsburgh and New York. Connick also studied drawing and painting in night classes and went to England and France to study ancient and modern stained glass, including those in the Chartres Cathedral, in which he examined the effect of light and optics that had been employed in the 12th and 13th centuries, but which he perceived to be neglected since. Connick was also influenced by English Arts and Crafts Movement stained glass artist Christopher Whall.

Connick's first major work, All Saints Church in Brookline, Massachusetts, was completed in 1910. Connick settled in Boston where he opened his stained glass studio at Nine Harcourt Street, Back Bay, Boston, in 1913. From there until his death, Connick designed and produced many notable stained glass windows including the rose windows of the Cathedrals of St. Patrick and St. John the Divine in New York City, and windows in the Princeton University Chapel, the American Church in Paris, and in the Calvary Episcopal and East Liberty Presbyterian churches in Pittsburgh. One of his largest works is in the Heinz Memorial Chapel at the University of Pittsburgh. Heinz Chapel, regarded by many as Connick's most important commission, has the distinction of having all of its 23 windows (4,000 square feet (370 m^{2})) designed by Connick, including its 73-foot (22 m) tall transept windows which are among the tallest such windows in the world.

Connick also authored the book Adventures in Light and Color, modestly subtitled An Introduction to the Stained Glass Craft, as well as a series for Random House titled International Studio (1923–24).

His work involved close collaborations not only with architects but also with other artists, including the poet Robert Frost, with whom Connick had an ongoing friendship. For one of a pair of windows for the Newtonville Branch Library, in Newton, Massachusetts, Connick included in the glass the opening line of Frost's poem "Mending Wall" . Frost was present at the dedication of the building in 1939 to read this poem. The second window was inspired by Emily Dickinson's poem "There is no frigate like a book." The pair of Connick windows, which are in a more personalized Arts and Crafts style rather than his more known ecclesiastical designs, contribute to the significance of the Newtonville Library which is part of the Newtonville Historic District.

Connick was active in, among other societies, the Boston Art Club, Boston Architectural Club, The Mural Painters, and the Copley Society of Art. Connick adopted the Pegasus as his symbol and designed it in stained glass which was carved on his gravestone.

Charles Jay Connick died on December 28, 1945. At his death, The New York Times reported that Dr. Connick was "considered the world's greatest contemporary craftsman in stained glass." (The New York Times, Saturday, December 29, 1945, p. 13.)

== Style ==
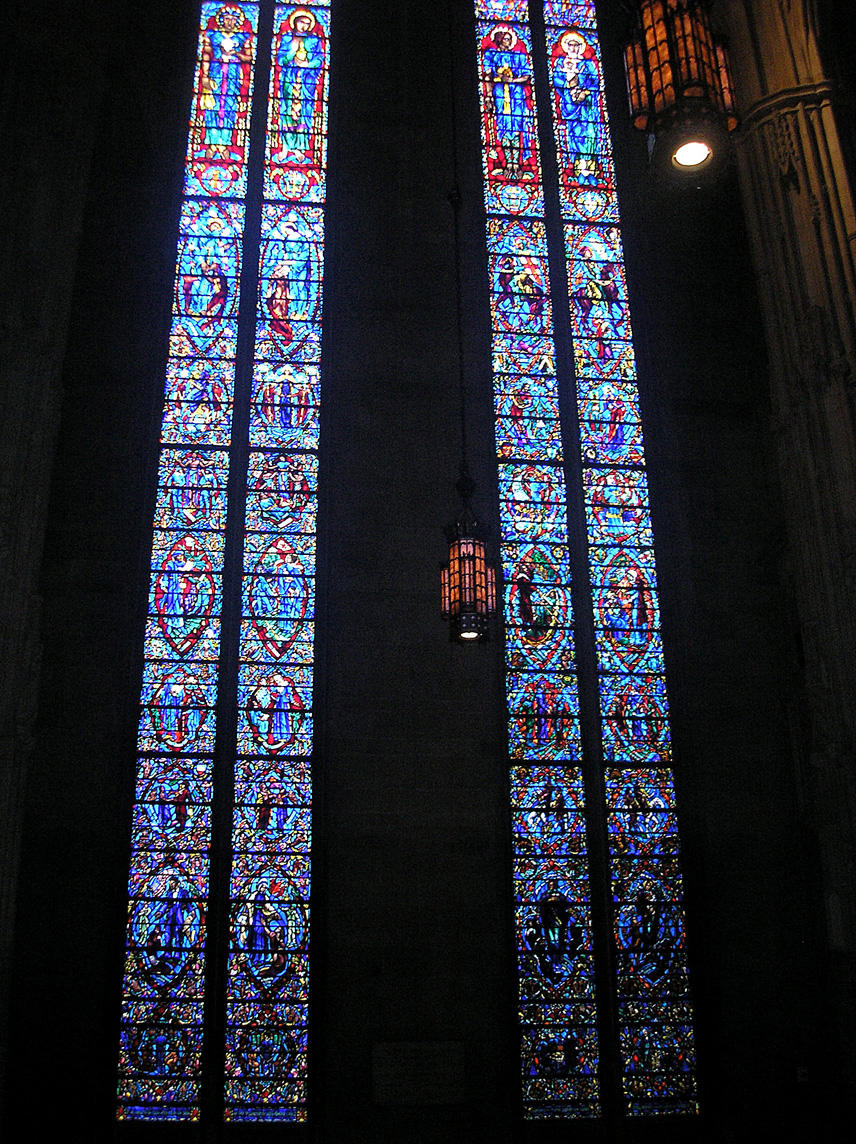
Connick's 73-foot (22 m) tall transept windows of Heinz Memorial Chapel at the University of Pittsburgh are among the tallest in the world

Connick preferred to use clear "antique" glass, similar to that of the Middle Ages and praised this type of glass as "colored radiance, with the lustre, intensity, and baffling vibrant quality of dancing lights." He employed a technique of "staggered" solder-joints in his leading and bars, which English stained-glass historian Peter Cormack says gives the windows their "syncopated or 'swinging' character." His style incorporated a strong interest in symbolism as well. Connick expressed the opinion that the first job of stained glass was to serve the architectural effect, and he believed that his greatest contribution to glasswork was "rescuing it from the abysmal depth of opalescent picture windows" of the sort popularized by Louis Comfort Tiffany and John La Farge. Although firmly committed to a regenerated handicraft tradition, Connick welcomed innovation and experimentation in design and technique among his co-workers at his studio.

== Studio ==
In many respects, Connick's Boston studio was the arts and crafts ideal in that the art was produced by a community of committed craftsmen. At its height in the 1930s, forty to fifty men and women worked at the studio, which, as Connick wrote in his will, was "only incidentally a business." A reporter visiting his studio in 1931 remarked on the atmosphere of mutual respect that was present there saying "Attitude to his co-designers [is] that of one artist to another...He [Connick] originates, supervises. They elaborate." Connick left his studio and business to the craftsmen which became a cooperative after his death. For 41 years the studio continued to receive commissions and design windows in the Connick tradition. The studio closed its workshop in 1986 because the workers were aging and the modern high-rises of Copley Square threatened the light source essential to their work. The final commissioned window the studio produced was placed in All Saints Parish of Brookline, Massachusetts. Shortly after closing, the studio donated its collection of records, working drawings and related materials to the Boston Public Library. Throughout its history, the Charles J. Connick Associates Studio produced some 15,000 windows in more than 5,000 churches and public buildings.

== Foundation ==
The Charles J. Connick Stained Glass Foundation, Ltd., was formed after the studio closed in 1986. Its mission is to "promote the true understanding of the glorious medium of color and light and to preserve and perpetuate the Connick tradition of stained glass." In December 2008, the foundation donated materials to the Massachusetts Institute of Technology's Rotch Library of Architecture and Planning to form the Charles J. Connick Stained Glass Foundation Collection. This collection contains photographs, slides, stained glass windows and designs, paintings, and documents related to both the foundation and the studio. MIT has processed the collection and made it available digitally.

== Locations of works ==
The following is an incomplete list, sorted by location, of Connick stained glass works in the United States.

- California
  - Pasadena: Throop Unitarian Universalist Church
  - San Francisco:
    - Grace Cathedral
    - St. Dominic's Catholic Church
- Colorado
  - Denver: Cathedral of St. John in the Wilderness
- Connecticut
  - Hartford: Asylum Hill Congregational Church
- District of Columbia
  - Washington, D.C.: St. Gabriel's Church
- Illinois
  - Chicago: Fourth Presbyterian Church
  - Evanston: Northwestern University Seabury Hall (2122 N Sheridan Rd.)
  - River Forest: Grace Lutheran Church
- Iowa
  - Des Moines: St. Augustin Catholic Church
- Massachusetts
  - Boston
    - Boston University Chapel, Boston University
    - Emmanuel Episcopal Church, Boston
  - Brookline: All Saints Parish
  - Hyde Park: First Congregational Church of Hyde Park
  - Leominster:Saint Mark's Episcopal Church
  - Marion:Saint Gabriel's Church, First Congregational Church of Marion
  - Milton:Saint Michael's Episcopal Church
  - Nahant: Greenlawn Cemetery
  - Newton: First Church, Second Church, Parish of the Good Shepherd, Church of the Holy City (Swedenborgian), Newtonville Library
  - North Easton: Unity Church
  - Salem: Harmony Grove Cemetery Chapel
  - Waltham: Christ Church
  - Winthrop:St. John's Episcopal Church, St. John's Episcopal Church
  - Worcester: Dinand Library, College of the Holy Cross
- Michigan
  - Detroit:
    - Cathedral Church of St. Paul
    - Metropolitan United Methodist Church
    - Holy Redeemer Church
    - Chapel of St. Theresa-the Little Flower, later renamed St. Patrick Catholic Church
    - All Saint's Episcopal Church
    - Saint Mary of Redford Church
    - Woodlawn Mausoleum
    - YMCA Chapel
  - Petoskey:
    - Emmanuel Episcopal Church (Connick Studios, 1962)

- Minnesota
  - Faribault: Thomas Scott Buckham Memorial Library
  - Minneapolis:Hennepin Avenue United Methodist Church
  - Saint Paul: Cathedral of Saint Paul, National Shrine of the Apostle Paul
- Missouri
  - Kansas City: Grace and Holy Trinity Cathedral, Episcopal Diocese of West Missouri
- Nebraska
  - Omaha:
    - St. Cecilia Cathedral (Omaha)
    - St. Margaret Mary Church
    - First Central Congregational Church
- New Hampshire
  - Peterborough: All Saints Episcopal Church
- New Jersey
  - Montclair: Union Congregational Church
  - Princeton: Princeton University Chapel
- New Mexico
  - Albuquerque: Cathedral Church of St. John
- New York
  - Buffalo: Westminster Presbyterian Church
  - New York City (Manhattan):
    - Cathedral of Saint John the Divine, Morningside Heights
    - St. Patrick's Cathedral, Midtown
    - Church of St. Vincent Ferrer, Upper East Side
- North Dakota
  - Valley City: Our Savior's Lutheran Church
- Ohio
  - Cincinnati: Hyde Park Community United Methodist Church
  - Columbus: First Congregational Church
  - Gambier: Pierce Hall, Kenyon College
- Oklahoma
  - Tulsa: St. John's Episcopal Church
- Oregon
  - Portland: Trinity Episcopal Cathedral

- Pennsylvania
  - Butler: St. Peter's Episcopal Church
  - Greensburg: First Presbyterian Church
  - Harrisburg: Pine Street Presbyterian Church
  - Pittsburgh:
    - Calvary Episcopal Church, East Liberty
    - Cathedral of Hope, East Liberty
    - First Baptist Church, Oakland
    - University of Pittsburgh, Oakland:
      - Cathedral of Learning
      - Heinz Memorial Chapel
      - Stephen Foster Memorial
    - Gordon Chapel, Shadyside
    - First Presbyterian Church of Edgewood, Edgewood, Allegheny County, Pennsylvania
  - Swissvale: First Presbyterian Church
- Tennessee
  - Chattanooga: Grace Episcopal Church
  - Knoxville: St. James Episcopal Church
  - Knoxville: Church Street United Methodist Church
- Texas
  - Houston, Texas:
    - Church of the Annunciation
    - St Anne's Catholic Church
    - Chapel of the Congregation of the Incarnate Word and Blessed Sacrament
    - St Mary's Seminary
    - Palmer Chapel
  - Sherman: St. Stephen's Episcopal Church
  - Waco: Armstrong Browning Library, Baylor University
- Utah
  - Salt Lake City: Cathedral Church of St. Mark
- Virginia
  - Staunton: Temple House of Israel
- Washington
  - Seattle: St. James Cathedral
  - Seattle: Epiphany Parish Episcopal Church
  - Shoreline: St. Dunstan's Church of the Highlands Parish
  - Spokane: Cathedral of St. John the Evangelist
- Wisconsin
  - Milwaukee: St. Joan of Arc Chapel, Marquette University
