= Bill Kalfass =

American baseball player (1916-1968)

- Pitcher
- Born: March 3, 1916; New York City, U.S.
- Died: September 8, 1968 (aged 52); Brooklyn, New York, U.S.
- Batted: Right Threw: Left

MLB debut
- September 15, 1937, for the Philadelphia Athletics

Last MLB appearance
- October 2, 1939, for the Philadelphia Athletics

MLB statistics
- Win–loss record: 1-0
- Earned run average: 3.00
- Strikeouts: 9
- Stats at Baseball Reference

Teams
- Philadelphia Athletics (1937)

William Philip Kalfass (March 3, 1916 – September 8, 1968) was an American Major League Baseball pitcher who played in 1937 with the Philadelphia Athletics. He batted right and threw left-handed.
