= Newtonville, Massachusetts =

Village in Newton, Massachusetts

Coordinates: 42°21′00″N 71°12′13″W

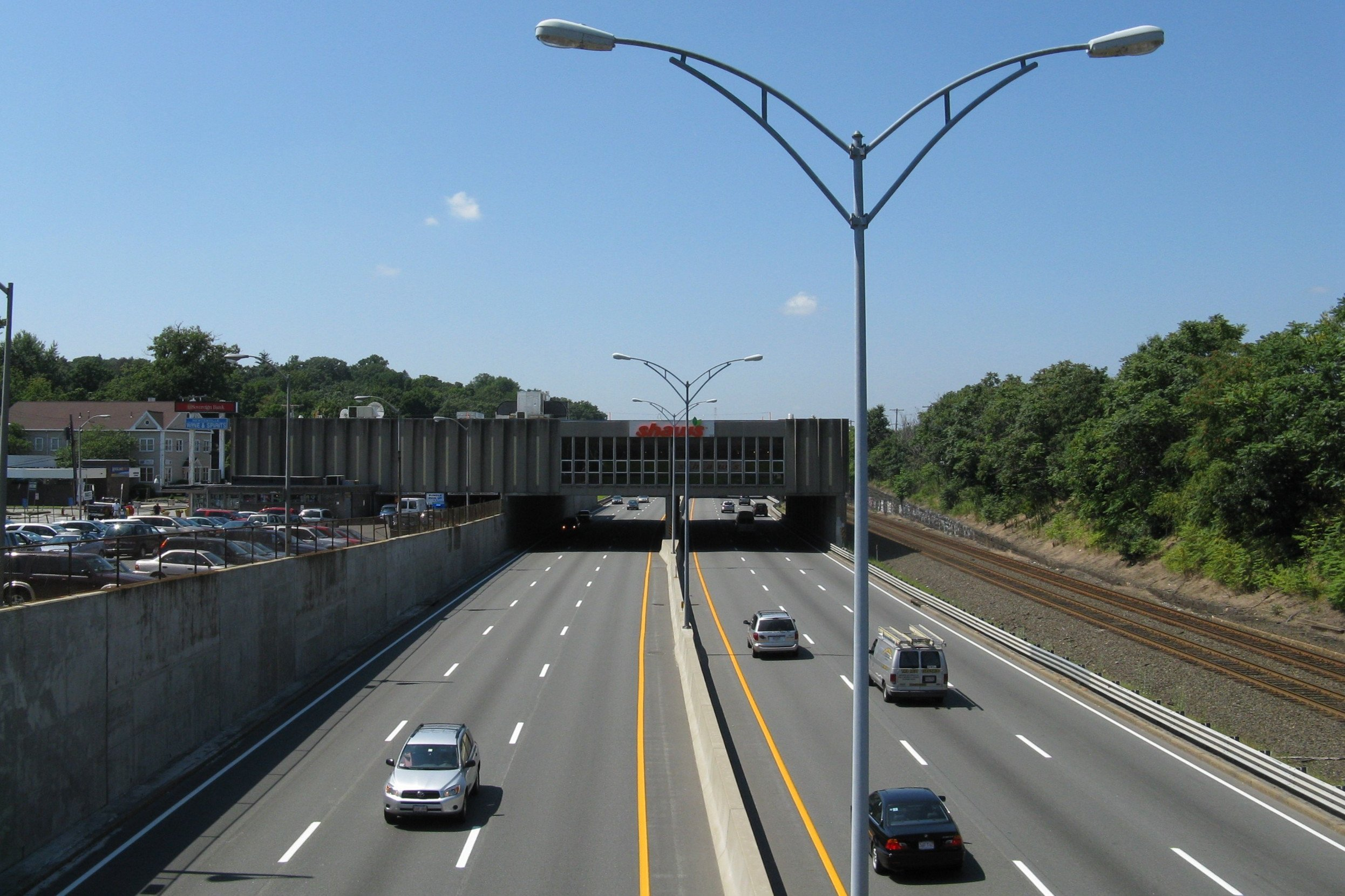
Mass Turnpike at Newtonville, showing supermarket with early use of air rights

Newtonville is one of the thirteen villages within the city of Newton in Middlesex County, Massachusetts, United States.

== History ==
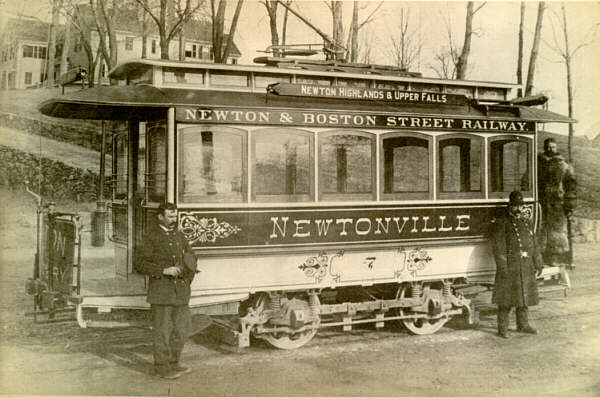
Newtonville trolley, around the turn of the 20th century

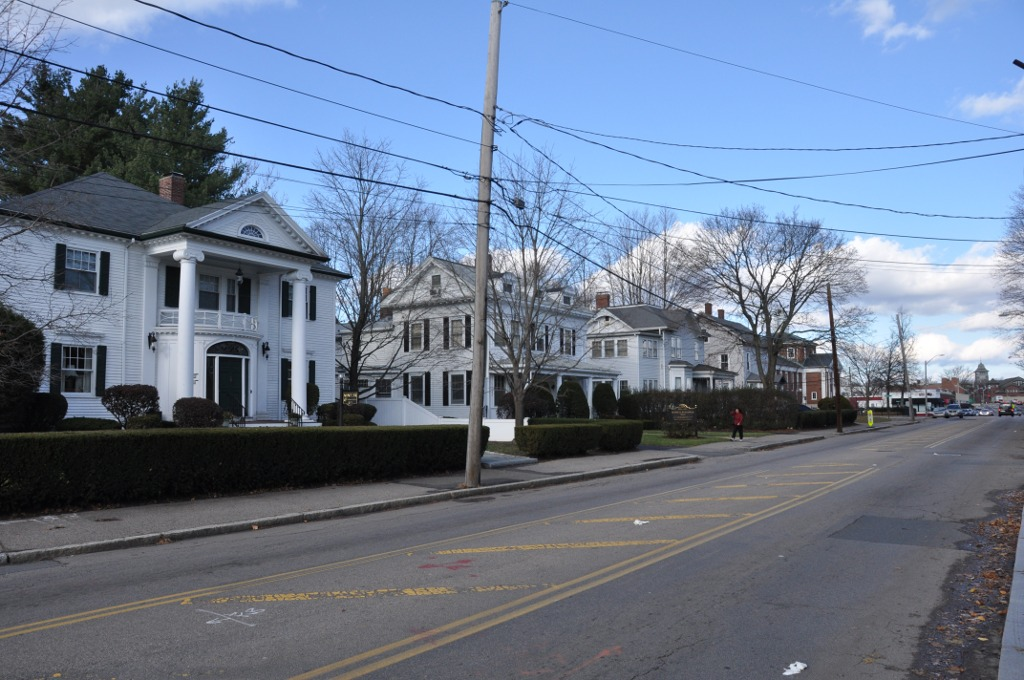
Residential section of Walnut Street in Newtonville

The suburban development of Newtonville began with the arrival of the railway in 1834. The village's growth started slowly, even after the rail depot opened in 1845. Major development in Newtonville started in the second half of the 19th century, which included the construction of a central high school in 1859. In 1880, Hull's Crossing station, now called Newtonville station, was built. The station attracted major development, as many professionals were able to live in Newtonville and commute to Boston by rail. Newtonville would further develop in the 1920s, when its town center expanded southward along Walnut Street.

The Star Market on Austin Street (briefly renamed "Shaw's") was one of the first projects in the country to acquire air rights for construction; the supermarket is built over the Massachusetts Turnpike.

== Geography ==
Newtonville is bordered by four other villages. Nonantum to the north, Newton Corner to the east, Newton Centre to the south, and West Newton to the west. Although Newton City Hall is located in Newton Centre, its property is contiguous with the border of Newtonville. The southern part of the village is home to Bullough's Pond and the Johnny Kelley Statue, marking the beginning of Heartbreak Hill for runners in the Boston Marathon.

== Arts and culture ==
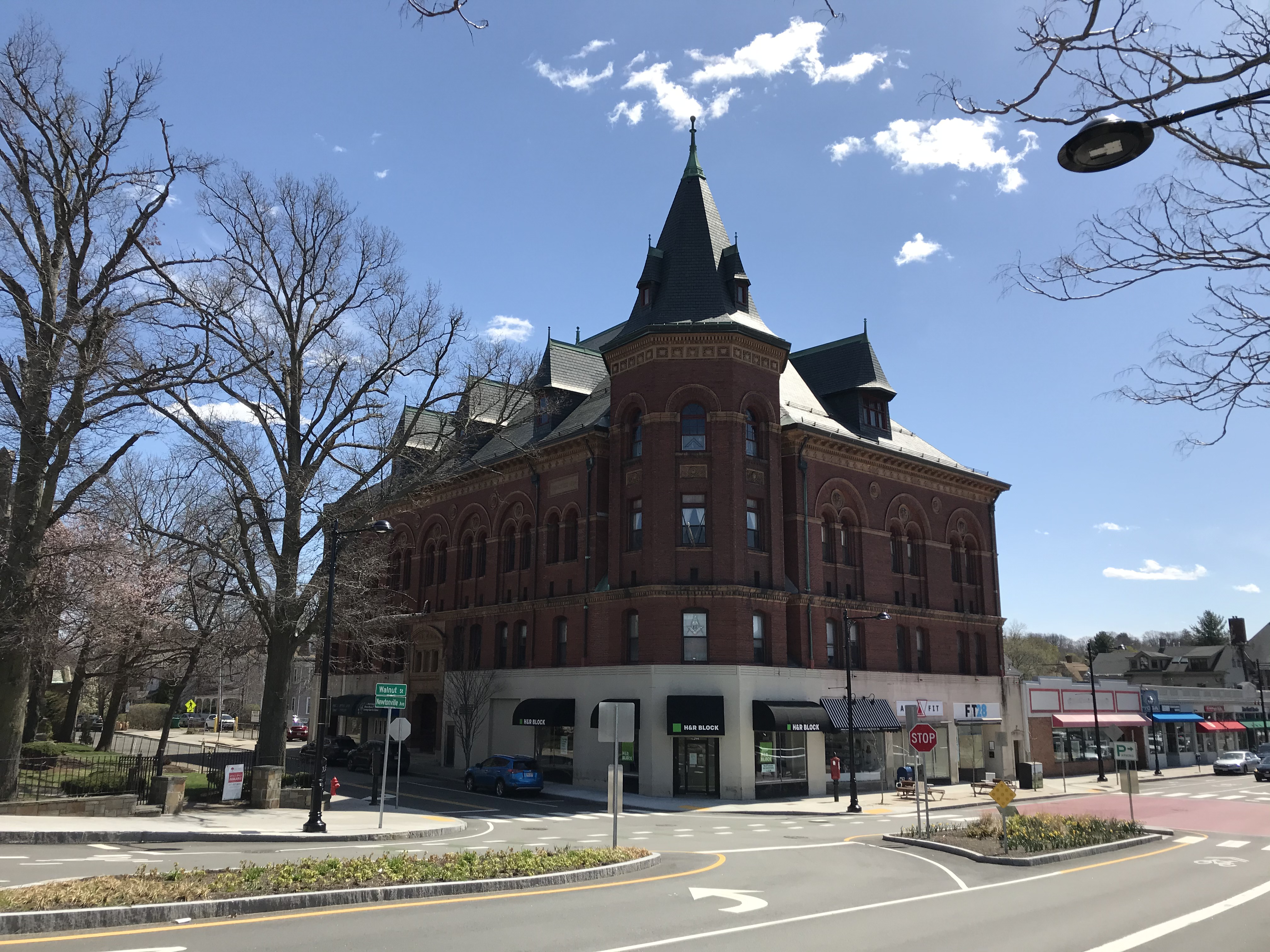
Masonic Building in Newtonville

Sites listed on the National Register of Historic Places include:

- Church of the Open Word
- Claflin School
- First Church of Christ, Scientist
- National Register of Historic Places listings in Newton, Massachusetts
- Masonic Building
- Newtonville Historic District
- Washington Park Historic District (Newton, Massachusetts)
- Celia Thaxter House

== Education ==
Located in Newtonville is Newton North High School, one of the city's two high schools, and Cabot Elementary School, one of the largest elementary schools in the city.

== Infrastructure ==
=== Transportation ===
Newtonville is bisected by the Massachusetts Turnpike, connecting it to neighboring villages in Newton and downtown Boston.

The village is served by the MBTA Commuter Rail's Framingham/Worcester Line at Newtonville station. The village is also served by MBTA bus routes 59, 553, 554, and 556.

== Notable people ==
- Alice Standish Allen (1907–2002), first female engineering geologist in North America
- Sheldon Brown (1944–2008), bicycle mechanic, technical expert and author
- William Claflin (1818–1905), 27th Governor of Massachusetts
- Charles Jay Connick (1875-1945), painter and designer of stained glass
- Julian Eltinge (born William Julian Dalton; 1881–1941), actor
- Elisha Gray (1835-1901), inventor
- Josephine Hull (1877–1957), actress, Academy Award winner
- Warren Huston (1913–1999), professional baseball player
- Kurt Lewin (1890–1947), philosopher, "founder of social psychology"
- Lillie Eginton Warren (1859–1926), educator, author, school founder, inventor of Expression Reading

== See also ==
- Ross, a steam-powered automobile produced in Newtonville from 1906 to 1909
- Cabot's Ice Cream and Restaurant
