= Ken Jungels =

American baseball player (1916–1975)

- Pitcher
- Born: June 23, 1916; Aurora, Illinois, U.S.
- Died: September 9, 1975 (aged 59); West Bend, Wisconsin, U.S.
- Batted: Right Threw: Right

MLB debut
- September 15, 1937, for the Cleveland Indians

Last MLB appearance
- June 7, 1942, for the Pittsburgh Pirates

MLB statistics
- Win–loss record: 1–0
- Earned run average: 6.80
- Strikeouts: 21
- Stats at Baseball Reference

Teams
- Cleveland Indians (1937–1938, 1940–1941); Pittsburgh Pirates (1942)

Kenneth Peter Jungels (June 23, 1916 – September 9, 1975) was an American Major League Baseball pitcher who played for five seasons. He played for the Cleveland Indians from 1937 to 1938 and 1940 to 1941 and the Pittsburgh Pirates in 1942.

Jungels' lone victory came on August 14, 1938, as a relief pitcher in the Indians 6–4 win over the Chicago White Sox. During World War II, he served stateside in the army. He died in West Bend, Wisconsin on September 9, 1975.
