= John Kroner =

American baseball player (1908–1968)

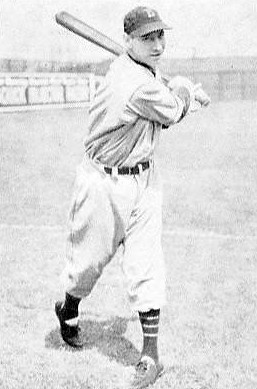
- Kroner in 1940
- Second baseman
- Born: November 13, 1908; St. Louis, Missouri, U.S.
- Died: April 26, 1968 (aged 59); St. Louis, Missouri, U.S.
- Batted: Right Threw: Right

MLB debut
- September 29, 1935, for the Boston Red Sox

Last MLB appearance
- September 29, 1938, for the Cleveland Indians

MLB statistics
- Batting average: .262
- Home runs: 7
- Runs batted in: 105
- Stats at Baseball Reference

Teams
- Boston Red Sox (1935–1936); Cleveland Indians (1937–1938)

John Harold Kroner (November 13, 1908 – April 26, 1968) was a second baseman in Major League Baseball who played from 1935 through 1938 for the Boston Red Sox (1935–36) and Cleveland Indians (1937–38). Listed at 6 ft 0 in (1.83 m), 185 lb., Kroner batted and threw right-handed. He was born in St. Louis, Missouri.

In a four-season career, Kroner was a .262 hitter (184-for-702) with seven home runs and 105 RBI in 223 games, including 83 runs, 47 doubles, nine triples, three stolen bases, and a .327 on-base percentage.

Kroner died in his hometown of St. Louis, Missouri, at age 59.
