= List of St. Louis Cardinals in the Baseball Hall of Fame =

Part of the National Baseball Hall of Fame and Museum
- Established: 1936 (dedicated June 12, 1939)
- Location: Cooperstown, New York
- Coordinates: 42.700322°N 74.92369°W
- Type: Professional sports hall of fame
- Visitors: 300,000/year (average as of 2013)
- Director: Jeff Idelson (since 2008)
- Website: baseballhall.org

The St. Louis Cardinals, a Major League baseball (MLB) franchise based in St. Louis, Missouri, have competed in the National League (NL) since 1892, and in the American Association (AA) from 1882 to 1891.^{[a]} They have won 11 World Series titles, one additional interleague championship and were co-champions (tied) in another prior to the modern World Series. Known as the Cardinals from 1900 to the present, the St. Louis franchise were also known as the Brown Stockings (1882), Browns (1883–98), and Perfectos (1899). A total of 55 players and other personnel associated with the Cardinals have been inducted into the National Baseball Hall of Fame and Museum in Cooperstown, New York.

The first former Cardinals players to be inducted into Baseball Hall of Fame were John McGraw and Cy Young in 1937, the second year of the Museum's annual balloting. Rogers Hornsby was the first to be inducted as Cardinal, which occurred in 1942. Of the 55 former Cardinals elected to the Hall of Fame, 17 have been inducted as Cardinals and 10 with the Cardinals logo on their caps. Two other inducted players have the Cardinals logo on their caps but were not inducted as Cardinals. The most recent individual associated with the Cardinals to be inducted is Dick Allen, inducted in 2025; he only spent one season with the Cardinals, and his Hall of Fame plaque bears a Philadelphia Phillies logo.

In addition, two separate awards – the Ford C. Frick Award and BBWAA Career Excellence Award – while not conferring the status of enshrining their recipients as members of the Hall of Fame, honor the works of a total of six sportswriters and broadcasters in connection with their coverage of the Cardinals. The Cardinals also have a franchise hall of fame known as the St. Louis Cardinals Hall of Fame Museum located within Ballpark Village adjacent to Busch Stadium, the Cardinals' home stadium.

== St. Louis Cardinals players, managers, and executives ==
Table key
†	Inducted as a Cardinal. Names listed in **bold** are depicted on their Hall of Fame plaques wearing a Cardinals cap insignia.
Ω	Spent more years with the Cardinals than any other team, though not inducted as a Cardinal

Inductees
Member	Years as Cardinal	Role(s)	Year inducted	Method	Notable achievement(s) as a Cardinal	Ref(s)
Grover Cleveland Alexander^{[b]}	1926–1929	Player	1938	BBWAA	1926 World Series champion 55–38 W–L, 3.08 ERA	
Dick Allen	1970	Player	2025	VC	1970 All-Star; 34 home runs, 101 RBI in only season with the team	
Walter Alston	1936	Manager	1983	VC		
Jake Beckley^{[b]}	1904–1907	Player	1971	VC		
Carlos Beltrán	2012–2013	Player	2026	BBWAA	2× All-Star; 2013 Roberto Clemente Award winner	
Jim Bottomley^{[b]}†	1922–1932	Player	1974	VC	1926 and 1931 World Series champion 1928 NL MVP.325 batting average (AVG),.537 slugging percentage (SLG) in 11 seasons	
Roger Bresnahan^{[b]}	1909–1912	Player	1945	OTC	Player/manager, batted .275	
**Lou Brock**†	1964–1979	Player	1985	BBWAA	1964 and 1967 World Series champion #2 MLB in stolen bases (938); 3,000 hit club	
Mordecai Brown^{[b]}	1903	Player	1949	OTC		
Jesse Burkett^{[d]}	1899–1901	Player	1946	OTC	.378 in three seasons (highest in franchise history); 1901 batting title (.376)	
Steve Carlton	1965–1971	Player	1994	BBWAA	1967 World Series champion 77–62 W–L, 3.10 ERA	
Orlando Cepeda	1966–1968	Player	1999	VC	1967 NL MVP and World Series winner	
Charles Comiskey^{[b]}	1882–1889, 1891	Pion./Exec.	1939	OTC	1886 World Series champion Four AA pennants.673 win% (Highest for St. Louis managers)	
Roger Connor^{[b]}	1894–97	Player	1976	VC		
**Dizzy Dean**†	1930, 1932–1937, 1941–1946	Player	1953	BBWAA	1934 MVP and World Series winner 4x NL strikeout, 2x wins, 2x shutouts champion	
Leo Durocher	1933–1937	Manager	1994	VC		
Dennis Eckersley	1996–1997	Player	2004	BBWAA		
Frankie Frisch^{[b]}†	1927–1938	Player	1947	BBWAA	1931 and 1934 World Series champion 1931 MVP.312 average as Cardinal player/manager	
Pud Galvin^{[b]}	1892	Player	1965	VC		
**Bob Gibson**†	1959–1975, 1995	Player	1981	BBWAA	1964 and 1967 World Series champion 1968 and 1970 Cy Young Award winner 1.12 ERA (modern record) and MVP in 1968; 18 Cardinals career pitching records	
Clark Griffith	1891	Player	1946	VC		
Burleigh Grimes	1930–1934	Player	1964	VC	1931 World Series champion	
Chick Hafey^{[b]}†	1924–1931	Player	1971	VC	.326 AVG, .568 SLG in eight seasons	
Jesse Haines^{[b]}†	1920–1937	Player	1970	VC	1926, 1931, and 1934 World Series champion Second in wins (210), IP (3203.2), and 5th in ShO (23) in franchise history	
**Whitey Herzog**†	1980–1990	Manager	2010	VC	1982 World Series champion and three NL pennants 822 wins (Third in franchise history).530 winning percentage 1985 NL Manager of the Year	
Rogers Hornsby^{[b]}†	1915–1926, 1933	Player	1942	BBWAA	1926 World Series champion Two batting Triple Crowns; Six consecutive batting titles 3× .400 batting average Second-highest career MLB batting average (.358)	
Miller Huggins	1910–1917	Manager	1964	VC	.402 on-base percentage Player/manager	
Jim Kaat	1980–1983	Player	2022	VC		
Tony La Russa^{Ω}	1996–2011	Manager	2014	VC	2006 and 2011 World Series champion Three NL pennants 1408 wins (Most in franchise history); 2002 NL Manager of the Year	
Rabbit Maranville	1927–1928	Player	1954	BBWAA		
Tommy McCarthy	1888–1891	Player	1946	VC		
John McGraw	1900	Manager	1937	VC	.344 AVG, .505 OBP in 1900	
Bill McKechnie	1928–1929	Manager	1962	VC	1928 NL pennant	
Joe Medwick^{[b]}†	1932–1940, 1947–1948	Player	1968	BBWAA	1937 NL Triple Crown and MVP.335 batting average (Fifth in franchise history) in 11 seasons	
Minnie Miñoso	1962	Player	2022	VC		
Johnny Mize^{[b]}†	1936–1941	Player	1981	VC	1939 NL batting title (.349); 1.018 OPS in six seasons (Third in franchise history)	
**Stan Musial**†	1941–1944, 1946–1963, 1967	Player	1969	BBWAA	1942, 1944, and 1946 World Series champion Three MVPs, seven batting titles 3,000 hit club More than 20 Cardinals career batting records	
Kid Nichols^{[b]}	1904–1905	Player	1949	OTC	Player/manager; 2.02 ERA, 21 W, 317 IP in 1904	
Branch Rickey^{Ω}	1919–1942	Pion./Exec	1967	VC	Founded minor league farm system in use today	
Wilbert Robinson^{[b]}	1900	Manager	1946	OTC		
**Scott Rolen**	2002–2007	Player	2023	BBWAA	2006 World Series champion 4× Gold Glove winner 2002 Silver Slugger Award winner 4× All-Star	
**Red Schoendienst**†	1945–1956, 1961–1976, 1979–1995	Player	1989	VC	1946, 1964, 1967, and 1982 World Series champion 9x All-Star.289 batting average, 1980 hits 1,041 wins as manager (Second in franchise history)	
**Ted Simmons**†	1968–1980	Player	2020	VC	6x All-Star; 1980 Silver Slugger Award winner	
**Enos Slaughter**†	1938–1942, 1946–1953	Player	1985	VC	1942 and 1946 World Series champion.305 batting average, .847 OPS; 10× All-Star; 135 triples, 146 home runs	
Lee Smith	1990–1993	Player	2019	VC	3x All-Star; 2x Rolaids Relief Man Award; 2x NL saves leader	
**Ozzie Smith**†	1982–1999	Player	2002	BBWAA	1982 World Series champion 11× Gold Glove winner 1987 Silver Slugger Award winner 1995 Roberto Clemente Award winner 14× All-Star; 1985 NLCS MVP	
John Smoltz	2009	Player	2015	BBWAA		
**Billy Southworth**†	1926–1927, 1929, 1940–1945	Manager	2008	VC	1926, 1942, and 1944 World Series champion Three NL pennants as manager.642 W–L% (Second in franchise history)	
**Bruce Sutter**	1981–1984	Player	2006	BBWAA	1982 World Series champion 3× NL saves leader, 127 saves, 2.72 ERA	
Joe Torre	1969–1974, 1990–1995	Manager	2014	VC	1971 MVP and batting champion (.363).498 winning percentage as manager	
Dazzy Vance	1933–1934	Player	1955	BBWAA		
Larry Walker	2004–2005	Player	2020	BBWAA		
Bobby Wallace^{[d]}	1899–1901, 1917–1918	Player	1953	VC		
Hoyt Wilhelm	1957	Player	1985	BBWAA		
Vic Willis^{[d]}	1910	Player	1995	VC		
Cy Young	1899–1900	Player	1937	BBWAA	45–35, 2.78 ERA, 690.1 IP, 137 ERA+	

== Broadcasters and sportswriters ==
Ford C. Frick Award (broadcasters)
Recipient	Years covering Cardinals	Year awarded	Stations / networks	Ref(s)
Jack Buck	1954–2001	1987	KMOX, CBS (World Series)	
Joe Buck	1991–2008	2026	KMOX, Fox Sports, ESPN	
Harry Caray	1945–1969	1989	WIL (AM), KMOX	
Joe Garagiola	1955–1962	1991	KMOX	
Tim McCarver	2014–2019	2012	KMOX, FOX	

BBWAA Career Excellence Award (sportswriters)
Recipient	Years covering Cardinals	Year awarded	Publications	Ref(s)
Bob Broeg	1946–2004	1979	St. Louis Post-Dispatch, The Sporting News	
Rick Hummel	1971–2023	2006	St. Louis Post-Dispatch	
J. G. Taylor Spink	1914–1962	1962	The Sporting News	
J. Roy Stockton	1915–1958	1972	St. Louis Post-Dispatch	

- Bob Uecker, a Ford C. Frick Award winner, also played for the St. Louis Cardinals.

== Artifacts ==
The National Baseball Hall of Fame and Museum has collected artifacts related to notable achievements of Cardinals players, including:

- Chick Hafey's glove, spikes and glasses.
- The glove Taylor Douthit wore when setting the Major League record for outfield putouts in 1928.
- Stirrups Dizzy Dean wore
- Switch hitter Frankie Frisch's bat.
- A jersey of Joe Medwick's, circa 1937.
- The Most Valuable Player Award trophy presented to Stan Musial in 1946.
- The spikes Lou Brock wore when he stole his 893rd base in a game against the San Diego Padres, on August 29, 1977, breaking Ty Cobb's record.

== See also ==
- List of Los Angeles Dodgers in the Baseball Hall of Fame
- List of New York Yankees in the Baseball Hall of Fame
