= 1942 Baseball Hall of Fame balloting =

Elections to the Baseball Hall of Fame

National Baseball

Hall of Fame and Museum
- New inductees: 1
- via BBWAA: 1
- Total inductees: 27

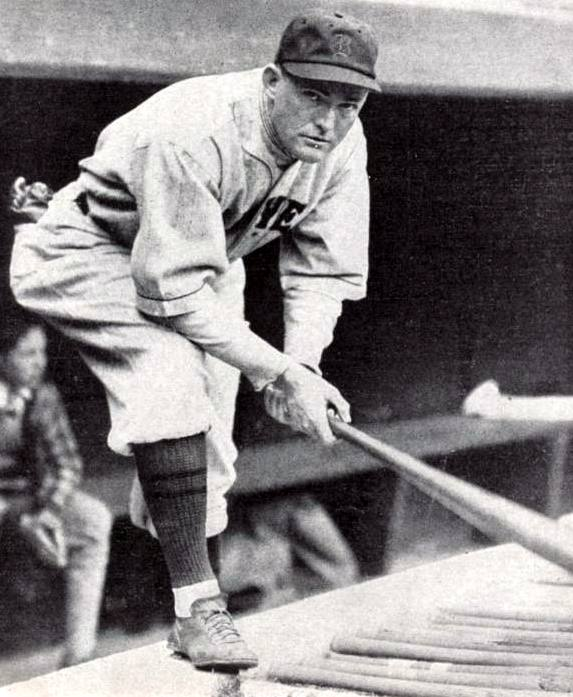
Rogers Hornsby, sole 1942 inductee

The 1942 election to the Baseball Hall of Fame was the first election that was conducted in three years. The Baseball Writers' Association of America (BBWAA) voted by mail to select from 20th century players and elected Rogers Hornsby.

This was the only election or committee meeting scheduled between 1939 and 1945, as the hall of fame had inducted its required number of ten players from the 20th century following the 1939 election; the United States was involved in World War II during that time. The only other activities were the special election of Lou Gehrig following his 1939 farewell and the prompt election of Commissioner Landis following his death late in 1944.

== After the grand opening ==
After the National Baseball Museum opened in 1939, it remained to be determined how the membership in its Hall of Fame would be determined in the future. The Baseball Writers' Association of America (BBWAA) had determined to vote every three years rather than annually, although it had voted in a special election to consider Lou Gehrig. That move was a widely criticized, as observers generally agreed that it was a good pace to elect about three recent players annually, as from 1936 to 1939.

After the Centennial Committee made six selections in 1939 from the figures of the 19th century, baseball's Commissioner Landis completely revised the committee's membership, designating it the Hall of Fame Committee and establishing it as the institution's permanent governing body. From 1939 to 1944 its four members were Athletics owner and manager Connie Mack, Yankees president Ed Barrow, Braves president Bob Quinn, and sportswriter Sid Mercer. This committee was responsible, in its function as the Old-Timers Committee, for selecting additional worthy candidates from the 19th century, but it never convened during this 5-year period, and thereby selected no one. Inaction fostered greater complaints that the stars of the 1880s and 1890s were being ignored. The relative slight was tiny because the baseball writers voted only once between 1939 and 1945 and elected only one recent player.

== BBWAA election ==
Members of the BBWAA again had the authority to select any players active in the 20th century, provided they had been retired for one year. Voters were instructed to cast votes for 10 candidates; any candidate receiving votes on at least 75% of the ballots would be honored with induction to the Hall.

A total of 233 ballots were cast, with 2,328 individual votes for 72 specific candidates, an average of 9.99 per ballot; 175 votes were required for election. Players of the 1900s and 1910s, who many voters felt should be given priority, dominated the voting to an even greater extent than they had in 1939. Of the top 22 candidates in the voting, 17 had not seen any substantial play since 1917; only 3 of the top 32 had played their final season anytime between 1918 and 1933. Players who had been retired over 24 years – 42 of the 72 named – received 66% of the votes. The results were announced in January 1942. The sole candidate who received at least 75% of the vote and was elected is indicated in bold italics; candidates who have since been selected in subsequent elections are indicated in italics:

Players	Votes	Percent	Change
**Rogers Hornsby**	182	78.1	▲13.9%
Frank Chance	136	58.4	▲0.7%
Rube Waddell	126	54.1	▼11.2%
Ed Walsh	113	48.5	▲0.3%
Miller Huggins	111	47.6	▲12.2%
Ed Delahanty	104	44.6	▼8.3%
Johnny Evers	91	39.1	Steady
Wilbert Robinson	89	38.2	▲21.4%
Mickey Cochrane	88	37.8	▲27.6%
Frankie Frisch	84	36.1	▲26.6%
Hugh Duffy	77	33.0	▲20.6%
Herb Pennock	72	30.9	▲16.3%
Clark Griffith	71	30.5	▲23.2%
Jimmy Collins	68	29.2	▲2.9%
Rabbit Maranville	66	28.3	▼1.6%
Hughie Jennings	64	27.5	▲15.5%
Mordecai Brown	63	27.0	▲7.3%
Eddie Plank	63	27.0	▲16.8%
Joe McGinnity	59	25.3	▲13.6%
Fred Clarke	58	24.9	▲3.4%
Roger Bresnahan	57	24.5	Steady
Chief Bender	55	23.6	▲9.0%
Ray Schalk	53	22.7	▲9.9%
Pie Traynor	45	19.3	▲15.7%
Ross Youngs	44	18.9	▲6.5%
Frank Baker	39	16.7	▲5.8%
Dazzy Vance	37	15.9	▲10.4%
Bill Terry	36	15.5	▲9.7%
Joe Tinker	36	15.5	▲11.1%
Addie Joss	33	14.2	▲4.0%
Johnny Kling	15	6.4	▲1.3%
Nap Rucker	15	6.4	▲1.7%
Babe Adams	11	4.7	▲0.7%
Hank Gowdy	8	3.4	▲1.9%
Kid Nichols	5	2.1	▼0.5%
Jesse Burkett	4	1.7	-
Harry Heilmann	4	1.7	▼1.2%
Eddie Grant	3	1.3	▲0.6%
Branch Rickey	3	1.3	-
Zack Wheat	3	1.3	▼0.2%
Donie Bush	2	0.9	▲0.2%
Sam Crawford	2	0.9	▼1.3%
Pepper Martin	2	0.9	-
Roger Peckinpaugh	2	0.9	▲0.5%
Bobby Wallace	2	0.9	▼0.9%
Ginger Beaumont	1	0.4	-
Jake Beckley	1	0.4	-
Joe Boley	1	0.4	-
Bill Bradley	1	0.4	Steady
Lave Cross	1	0.4	Steady
Bill Dinneen	1	0.4	▼2.2%
Jack Dunn	1	0.4	-
Kid Elberfeld	1	0.4	-
Red Faber	1	0.4	▼0.7%
Billy Hamilton	1	0.4	-
Babe Herman	1	0.4	-
Waite Hoyt	1	0.4	Steady
Joe Kelley	1	0.4	Steady
Dickey Kerr	1	0.4	▼1.4%
Arlie Latham	1	0.4	-
Bobby Lowe	1	0.4	-
Sherry Magee	1	0.4	Steady
Deacon Phillippe	1	0.4	Steady
Edd Roush	1	0.4	▼2.5%
Amos Rusie	1	0.4	▼1.8%
Germany Schaefer	1	0.4	-
Everett Scott	1	0.4	Steady
Harry Steinfeldt	1	0.4	Steady
Fred Tenney	1	0.4	▼0.7%
Bill Wambsganss	1	0.4	-
Hack Wilson	1	0.4	Steady
Smoky Joe Wood	1	0.4	▼0.3%

Key to colors
Elected to the Hall. These individuals are also indicated in **bold italics**.
Players who were elected in future elections. These individuals are also indicated in plain italics.
