= Oscar R. Cauldwell =

U.S. Marine Corps Major General

Oscar Ray Cauldwell
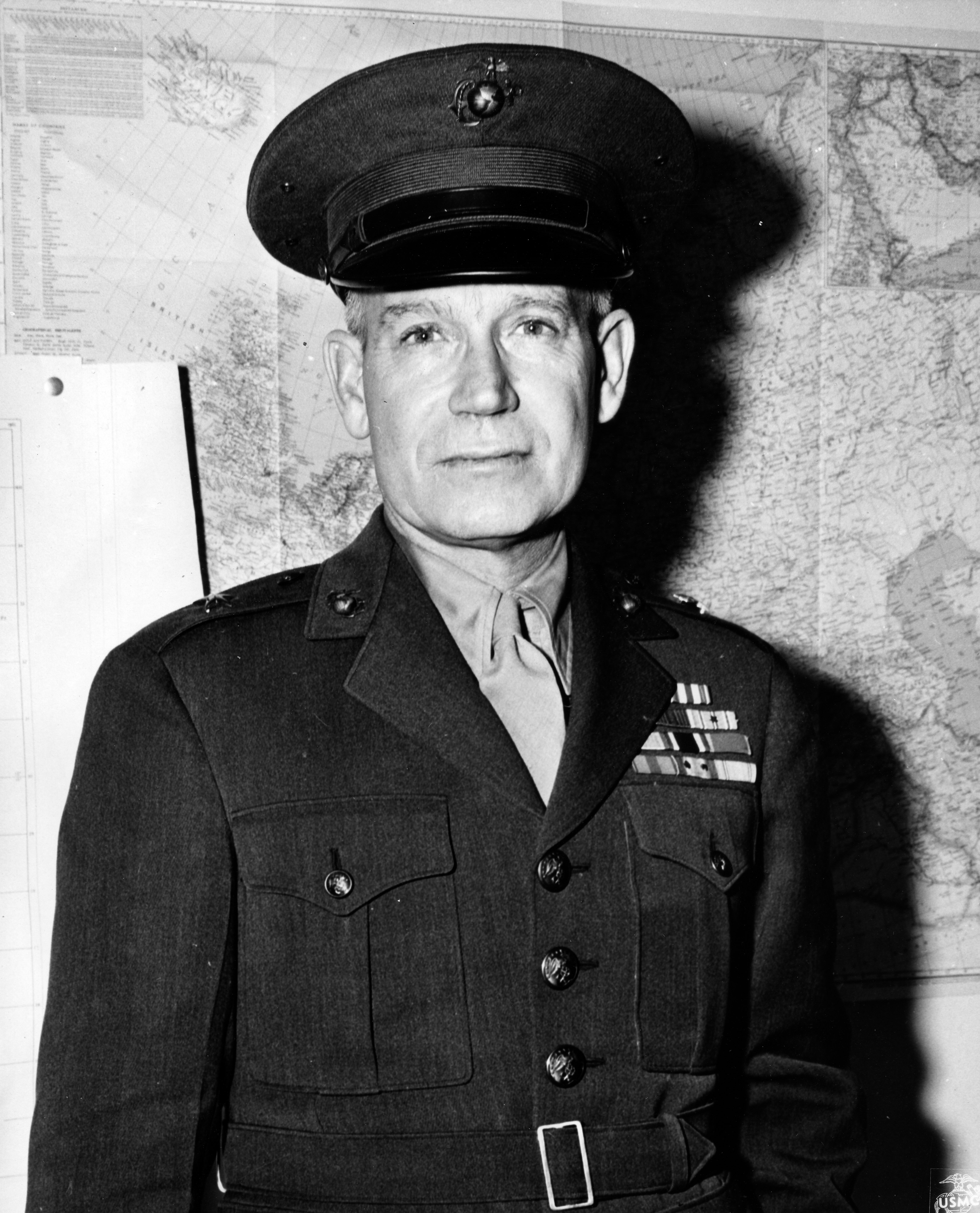
- Cauldwell as brigadier general, USMC
- Born: August 24, 1892; Nyesville, Indiana, US
- Died: September 8, 1959 (aged 67); Hartford, Connecticut, US
- Burial place: Arlington National Cemetery
- Military career
- Allegiance: United States of America
- Branch: United States Marine Corps
- Service years: 1916–1946
- Rank: Major general
- Nickname: "Speed"
- Service number: 0-156
- Commands: CoS of I MAC; ADC of 3rd Marine Division; 3rd Marine Regiment
- Conflicts: World War I: Battle of Belleau Wood; Haitian Campaign World War II: Battle of Koromokina Lagoon; Bougainville campaign
- Awards: Silver Star; Bronze Star; Purple Heart

Oscar Ray Cauldwell (August 24, 1892 – September 8, 1959) was an officer of the United States Marine Corps with the rank of major general, who served as assistant division commander of 3rd Marine Division and later as commanding general of the Training Command, Fleet Marine Force, San Diego, during World War II.

== Early career ==
Oscar Ray Cauldwell was born on 24 August 1892 in Nyesville, Indiana. He attended the Wabash College in Crawfordsville, Indiana, and after graduation, he attended the United States Naval Academy in Annapolis, Maryland. Cauldwell graduated on 2 June 1916 and was commissioned second lieutenant in the Marine Corps on the same date. He was subsequently ordered to the Marine Corps Officers School at Norfolk, Virginia, where he graduated from the course in December 1916.

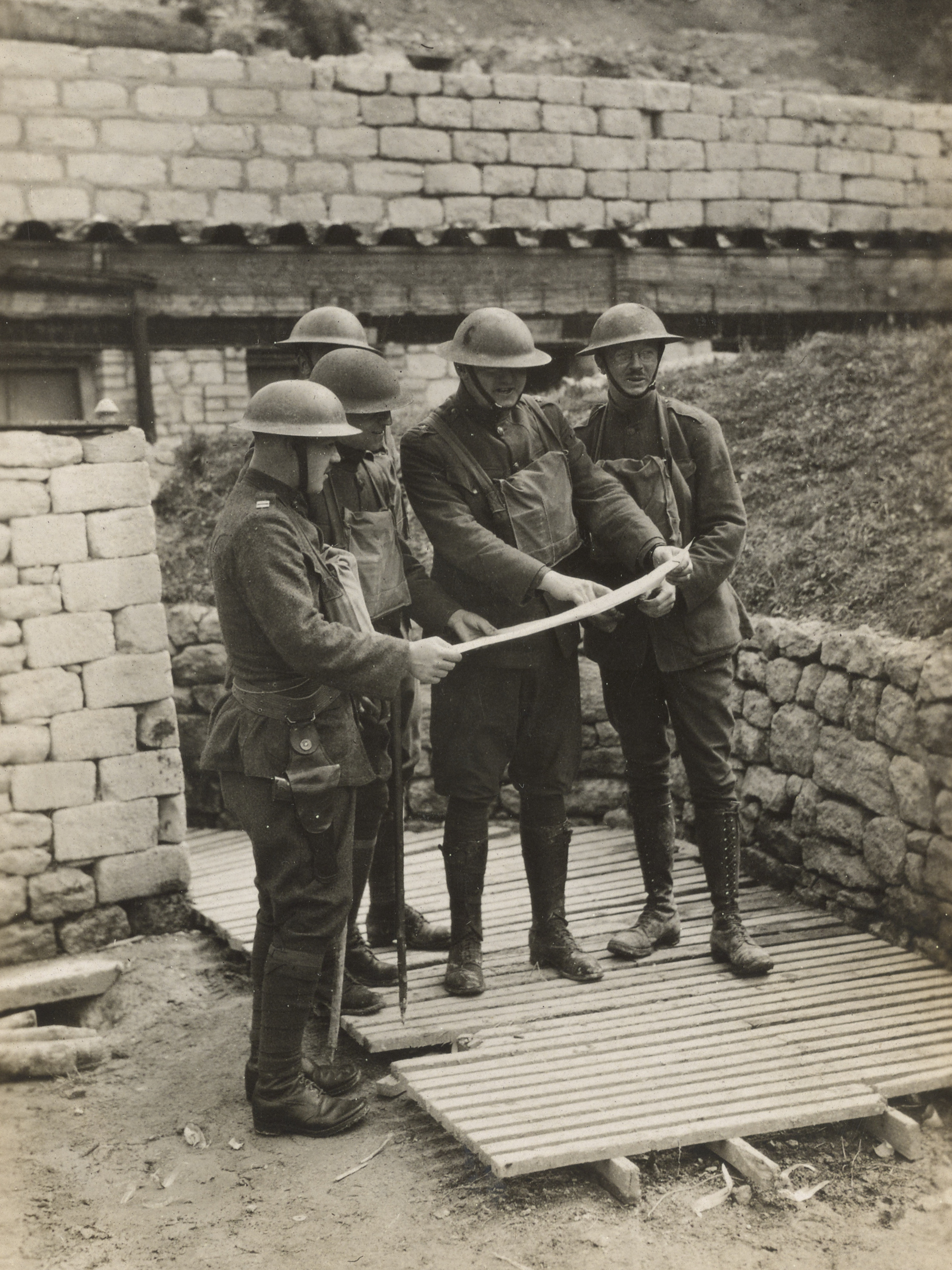
Officers of the 1st Battalion, 6th Marine Regiment, at battalion headquarters near the front at Sommedieue, France, April 30, 1918. Captain Oscar R. Cauldwell, commanding the 95th Company, is stood to the left.

Cauldwell was subsequently appointed aide-de-camp to the Commander of Advanced Base Force at Philadelphia, Pennsylvania, and served in this capacity until August 1917, four months after the American entry into World War I, when he was transferred to the newly formed 6th Marine Regiment at Quantico Base, Virginia. The 6th Marines sailed overseas in September 1917 and Cauldwell was now appointed commanding officer of the 95th Company, part of the regiment's 1st Battalion. After its arrival in France, Cauldwell commanded the company in the trenches within the Toulon Sector near Verdun. He was promoted to the rank of captain on 6 October 1917.

He commanded his unit during the Battle of Belleau Wood in June 1918, until he was wounded in leg by enemy fire on 5 June. Cauldwell stayed in hospital until October 1918, when he returned to his unit. With the war by now over due to the armistice with Germany on November 11, he subsequently served with the Occupation forces in Germany until he was ordered back to the United States in August 1919.

== Interwar period ==
After his return to the United States, Cauldwell attended the Army Infantry School at Fort Benning, Georgia, before he was appointed instructor at Marine Corps School at Quatinco Base. He served in this capacity until July 1923, when he was transferred to the Marine Detachment aboard the battleship USS Nevada. Cauldwell sailed for Haiti in August 1924 and was transferred to the 1st Brigade of Marines at Port-au-Prince one month later.

He was ordered back to the United States in March 1925, when he was assigned to the course at Command and General Staff School at Fort Leavenworth, Kansas. After graduation, Cauldwell was appointed an instructor at Quatinco Base and served there until October 1928, when he was ordered back to Haiti. He was assigned back to the 1st Marine Brigade and served as visiting inspector, headquarters inspector or operations officer. During that time, Cauldwell was promoted to the rank of major on November 5, 1929. He was subsequently appointed commandant of the École Militaire of the Garde d'Haïti in August 1930 and served in this capacity until July 1933. For his service in Haiti, Cauldwell was decorated with Haitian National Order of Honour and Merit and also with Haitian Distinguished Service Medal with Diploma.

After his return, Cauldwell attended Army War College and after graduation in June 1934, he was assigned to Senior Course at Naval War College in Newport, Rhode Island. Major Cauldwell graduated in May 1935 and was subsequently assigned to the War Plans Section within 1st Marine Brigade at Quantico. Following a brief period of duty there, he was transferred to San Diego, California, in November 1935, where he was appointed to the War Plans Section within Fleet Marine Force. To his new duties, Cauldwell was promoted to the rank of lieutenant colonel on October 15, 1935.

He spent there another three and half years in San Diego and served in the various capacities as a battalion commander, commander of the Rifle Range Detachment or commanding officer of the Marine Corps Recruit Depot.

== Pacific War ==
In May 1939, Cauldwell was assigned again at Naval War College in Newport, Rhode Island, where he attended Advanced course. He graduated from the course one year later and was assigned to the Staff of Naval War College. During his studies, Cauldwell was promoted to the rank of colonel on 1 July 1939.

He left Naval War College in March 1942, when he was transferred for brief period to the Administrative Command, Amphibious Force Atlantic Fleet. But in June 1942, Cauldwell was transferred to Camp Lejeune, North Carolina, where he took command of 3rd Marine Regiment. The 3rd Regiment was deployed to American Samoa in September 1942 and subsequently was reassigned to the 3rd Marine Division in May 1943.

Cauldwell was promoted to the rank of brigadier general on 26 October 1942 and was appointed assistant division commander of 3rd Marine Division in September 1943. He served in this capacity during Bougainville Campaign and personally distinguished himself, while commanding his units during the Battle of Koromokina Lagoon. Cauldwell was subsequently decorated with the Silver Star for his leadership and gallantry in action.

=== Silver Star citation ===
His official Silver Star citation reads follows:

The President of the United States of America takes pleasure in presenting the Silver Star to Brigadier General Oscar Ray Cauldwell (MCSN: 0-156), United States Marine Corps, for conspicuous gallantry and intrepidity as Assistant Division Commander, THIRD Marine Division, during action against enemy Japanese forces in the Battle of the Koromokima Lagoon, Bougainville, Solomon Islands, November 7, 1943. Realizing the acute dangers facing expected Army reinforcements, Brigadier General Cauldwell proceeded in the face of concentrated enemy rifle and machine-gun fire to an advance command post which was at that time only seventy-five yards behind the front lines. When Japanese snipers armed with machine guns infiltrated through to the command post, engaging headquarters personnel in a fire fight, Brigadier General Cauldwell remained at his position despite the lack of cover or protection from hostile fire, advising and assisting the launching of a coordinated attack which ultimately destroyed the hostile forces. Ignoring torrential rains and defying enemy opposition, he refused to leave the scene of battle until the flank of the beachhead had been secured. His resolute determination, cool courage and inspiring devotion to duty were in keeping with the highest traditions of the United States Naval Service.

— Admiral William Halsey Jr., Commander South Pacific

== Later service ==
Cauldwell was appointed chief of staff of the I Marine Amphibious Corps on December 18, 1943, under the command of Major General Roy Geiger. He succeeded Brigadier General Alfred H. Noble in that capacity and served in this capacity during the initial stages of Bougainville campaign.

In January 1944, Cauldwell was reassigned back to the United States and was subsequently assigned to the Headquarters Marine Corps in Washington, D.C., where he stayed until April. He was then appointed commanding general of the Training Command, Fleet Marine Force at San Diego. His main responsibility was to supervise the Training of Replacements units for Marine units serving overseas. Cauldwell also supervised the Training of the 5th Marine Division, which preparing for Pacific Theater. He was decorated with the Bronze Star for his service, while coordinated the training of Marine units at Palmyra Atoll.

Cauldwell served in this capacity until September 1945, when he was hospitalized at Naval Hospital, San Diego, with a sinus condition. He was placed on the retired list on May 1, 1946, and was also advanced to the rank of major general for having been specially commended in combat.

After his retirement, Cauldwell resided in Northfield, Vermont, where he lived together with his wife Margaret Brown Cauldwell (1896–1986) and their two daughters, Sara and Nancy. He worked as professor of mathematics at Avon Old Farms, Connecticut. An avid smoker, Major General Oscar Ray Cauldwell died early on September 8, 1959. He is buried at Arlington National Cemetery, Virginia.

== Decorations ==

1st Row	Silver Star			
2nd Row	Bronze Star Medal	Purple Heart	Navy Unit Commendation	Marine Corps Expeditionary Medal
3rd Row	World War I Victory Medal with two battle clasps	Army of Occupation of Germany Medal	American Defense Service Medal	American Campaign Medal
4th Row	Asiatic-Pacific Campaign Medal with one 3/16 inch service stars	World War II Victory Medal	Haitian National Order of Honour and Merit	Haitian Distinguished Service Medal with Diploma
