= Charlie Gehringer =

American baseball player (1903–1993)

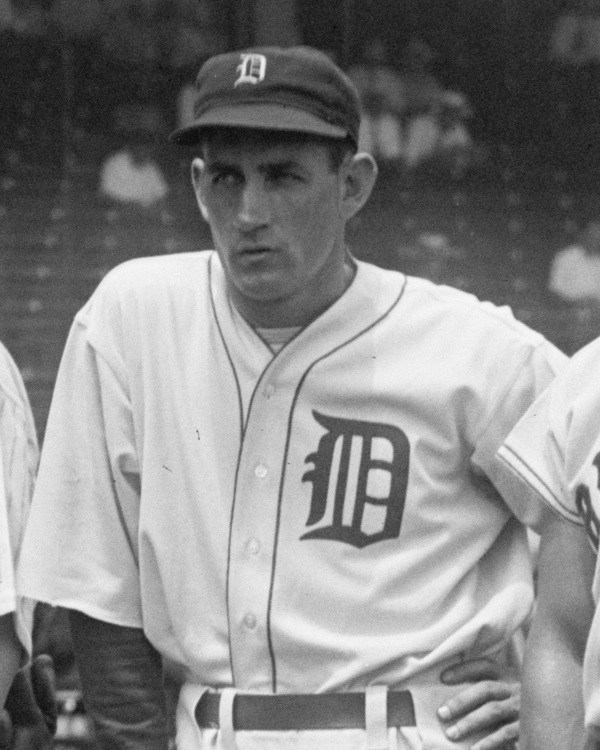
- Gehringer with the Detroit Tigers in 1937
- Second baseman
- Born: May 11, 1903; Fowlerville, Michigan, U.S.
- Died: January 21, 1993 (aged 89); Bloomfield Hills, Michigan, U.S.
- Batted: Left Threw: Right

MLB debut
- September 22, 1924, for the Detroit Tigers

Last MLB appearance
- September 27, 1942, for the Detroit Tigers

MLB statistics
- Batting average: .320
- Hits: 2,839
- Home runs: 184
- Runs batted in: 1,427
- Stats at Baseball Reference

Teams
- Detroit Tigers (1924–1942)

Career highlights and awards
- 6× All-Star (1933–1938); World Series champion (1935); AL MVP (1937); AL batting champion (1937); AL stolen base leader (1929); Detroit Tigers No. 2 retired

Member of the National

Baseball Hall of Fame
- Induction: 1949
- Vote: 85.0% (sixth ballot)

Charles Leonard Gehringer (May 11, 1903 – January 21, 1993), nicknamed "the Mechanical Man", was an American professional baseball second baseman. He played for the Detroit Tigers for 19 seasons from 1924 to 1942. He compiled a .320 career batting average with 2,839 hits and 1,427 runs batted in (RBIs). He had seven seasons with more than 200 hits and was the starting second baseman and played every inning of the first six All Star Games. He won the American League batting title in 1937 with a .371 average and won the American League Most Valuable Player Award. He helped lead the Tigers to three American League pennants (1934, 1935, and 1940) and the 1935 World Series championship.

Gehringer was also one of the best fielding second basemen in history. At the time of his retirement, he ranked first in Major League Baseball (MLB) history with 1,444 double plays turned at second base (now seventh in MLB history). He remains among MLB's all-time leaders with 7,068 assists at second base (second in MLB history) and 5,369 putouts (sixth in MLB history).

Gehringer later served as the Tigers general manager during the 1952 and 1953 seasons. After his playing career ended, he operated a company serving as an agent for manufacturers of automobile interior furnishings. He was inducted into the Baseball Hall of Fame in 1949 and had his jersey (No. 2) retired by the Tigers in 1983.

== Early years ==
Gehringer was born on May 11, 1903, on a farm in Iosco Township, Michigan. The son of German immigrants, he had nine half-siblings from his parents' prior marriages. When Gehringer was a young boy, the family moved to a 220-acre dairy and grain farm two miles south of Fowlerville, Michigan.

Gehringer later recalled his introduction to baseball:

We used to play a lot of baseball games out on the farm. We'd just throw three bags out there for bases and choose up sides. We'd usually get enough for two full teams. On a Sunday afternoon, nobody had anything better to do, so we'd just play baseball all day.

Gehringer attended Fowlerville High School where he led the baseball team to a state championship while playing as both an infielder and pitcher. He also played for a Fowlerville summer league team that competed against other town teams.

== University of Michigan ==
In 1921, Gehringer enrolled at the University of Michigan to study physical education and played on the university's freshman baseball team. The Ann Arbor News in May 1923 called him "one of the best third baseman prospects that has reported for a freshman squad in several years." Gehringer later recalled that he also played basketball at the University of Michigan: "Funny thing is, I won a letter in basketball but I didn' get one in baseball."

== Professional baseball ==
=== Discovery and minor leagues (1923 to 1925) ===
In the fall of 1923, after his first year at the University of Michigan, Gehringer was discovered by Detroit Tigers left fielder Bobby Veach. Veach was hunting in Fowlerville when a friend, Floyd Smith, recommended that Veach have a look at Gehringer. Veach brought him to Navin Field to work out and show the Tigers what he could do. Player-manager Ty Cobb was reportedly so impressed that he asked club owner Frank Navin to sign Gehringer to a contract on the spot. "I knew Charlie would hit and I was so anxious to sign him that I didn't even take the time to change out of my uniform before rushing him into the front office to sign a contract."'

In 1924, Gehringer played with London Tecumsehs in the Class B Michigan Ontario League. He was called up briefly at the end of September and played five games for the Tigers, batting .462 in 13 at-bats. He returned to the minor leagues where he played in 1925 for the Toronto Maple Leafs of the International League, compiling a .325 batting average with 206 hits and 25 home runs. In a brief call-up at the end of the 1925 season, he appeared in eight games for the Tigers, compiling a .167 batting average in 18 at bats.

=== Relationship with Cobb (1926) ===
Gehringer made the Tigers' regular-season roster in the spring of 1926. When second baseman Frank O'Rourke contracted measles, Gehringer played his first game as a starter on April 28, 1926. Gehringer committed two costly errors and was hitless in four at bats, leading the Associated Press to write:

Yesterday there was written at Navin field the sad story of the ambitious small town boy from a quiet Michigan village and his big league debut. It was sad because the ambitious boy, who has been called by Ty Cobb one of the best natural ball players he ever saw, made two glaring errors and otherwise deported himself unseemingly.

Gehringer took over as the Tigers' second baseman, appearing in 112 games at the position in 1926. He hit .277 and tallied 17 triples, second best in the American League. Playing for the "small ball" oriented Cobb, Gehringer also had a career-high 27 sacrifice hits in 1926. After Cobb's departure, Gehringer never again came close to 27 sacrifice hits.

Gehringer recalled that, at the start, Cobb "was like a father to me." Gehringer's father had died in 1924. Cobb even made Gehringer use his own bat. According to Gehringer, Cobb's bat was "a thin little thing", and though Gehringer would have preferred a bigger bat, "I didn't dare use another one." Cobb and Gehringer subsequently had a falling out. Cobb told Gehringer he needed more "pepper" and should "chatter like the rest of the infield." Cobb became peeved when Gehringer replied that "there were enough people talking and saying nothing." Gehringer later described Cobb as "a real hateful guy."

=== Gehringer becomes a star: 1927–1933 ===
After the 1926 season, Cobb left the Tigers and was replaced as manager by George Moriarty. During the off-season, Moriarty acquired Marty McManus from the St. Louis Browns. Moriarty chose McManus as his starting second baseman at the start of the 1927 season, but McManus was benched for disciplinary reasons, giving Gehringer the opportunity to return to the starting lineup at second base.

Gehringer seized the opportunity and had his breakout season in 1927. He led the American League's second basemen with 438 assists, 84 double plays turned, and a range factor of 6.19. He also blossomed as a hitter, batting .317 and scoring 110 runs — fourth best in the American League.

In 1928, he played in all 154 games for the Tigers, beginning a streak of 511 consecutive games. He hit .320, collected 193 hits (fifth best in the league), scored 108 runs (fifth best in the league), and had 507 assists (best in the league for a second baseman). At the end of the 1928 season, Gehringer placed 19th in the voting for the American League's Most Valuable Player.

Gehringer's steady improvement continued in 1929, as he hit .339 with an on-base percentage of .405, a slugging percentage of .532, and 106 RBIs. He also led the American League with 215 hits, 45 doubles, 19 triples (including three in one game on August 5), 131 runs scored, and 27 stolen bases. He also led the league in putouts (404) and fielding percentage (.975) by a second baseman and ranked second with 501 assists.

In 1930, Gehringer hit .330 with a .404 on-base percentage and a .534 slugging percentage. He also scored 144 runs (third in the league) and collected 201 hits, 78 extra base hits, 47 doubles (third in the league), 15 triples (fifth in the league), and 19 stolen bases (second in the league).

In relative terms, 1931 was an "off" year for Gehringer. His consecutive game streak ended in May, and he appeared in only 101 games. He also fell below the .300 mark (batting .298) for the only time between 1926 and 1941. Gehringer still had a fine year by most standards, and ended up No. 17 in the 1931 American League Most Valuable Player voting.

In 1932, Gehringer was back at full strength, playing in 152 games and hitting .325 with 112 runs, 107 RBI, and 44 doubles (second best in the league). Not generally known as a power hitter, Gehringer also hit 19 home runs in 1932, seventh best in the American League. At the end of the year, Gehringer was ninth in the league's MVP voting.

In 1933, he played in all 155 games for the Tigers, batting .330 (fifth best in the American League), and collecting 204 hits (second in the league), 42 doubles (fourth in the league), 105 RBIs, and a career-high 542 assists (best in the league for second basemen). Gehringer was once again among the top vote recipients in the 1933 MVP voting, this time placing sixth.

=== A quiet man ===
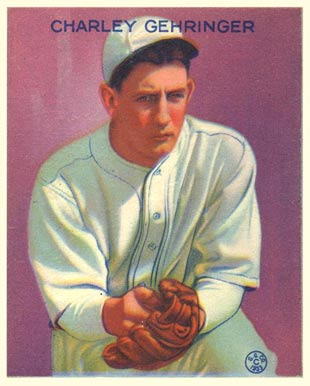
1933 Goudey baseball card

Gehringer had a reputation as a quiet man of few words. Player-manager Mickey Cochrane joked: "He says hello on opening day, goodbye on closing day, and in between, he hits .350."

Gehringer acknowledged his quiet demeanor: "I wasn't a rabble rouser. I wasn't a big noisemaker in the infield, which a lot of managers think you've got to be or you're not showing. But I don't think it contributes much." Gehringer also had a sense of humor about his reputation. At a civic banquet in his honor, Gehringer's entire speech consisted of the following: "I'm known around baseball as saying very little, and I'm not going to spoil my reputation." When asked why he signed his name "Chas. Gehringer", he responded: "Why use seven letters when four will do?" On another occasion, when asked about his closed-lip reputation, he responded: "Not true; if somebody asked me a question, I would answer them. If they said, 'Pass the salt,' I would pass the salt."

His unassuming nature is also reflected in his reaction to a "Charlie Gehringer Day" held by the Tigers in 1929. Fans from Gehringer's hometown and throughout Detroit filled the stands for a 17–13 win over the Yankees. Gehringer handled 10 chances at second base, had four hits including a home run, and stole home. In a ceremony, the people of Fowlerville presented Gehringer with a set of golf clubs. Though the clubs were right-handed, and Gehringer was left-handed, Gehringer learned to golf right-handed rather than trade for a left-handed set of clubs.

=== Back-to-back pennants (1934 and 1935) ===
In 1934, Gehringer had his best year to date, playing all 154 games and leading the Tigers to their first American League pennant in 25 years. His .356 batting average and .450 on-base percentage were both second best in the league. He led the league with 134 runs scored and 214 hits and tallied 42 doubles (second best in the league) and a career-high 127 RBIs (fifth best in the league). Gehringer finished second in the 1934 American League MVP voting, just two points behind Detroit's player-manager, Mickey Cochrane.

The Detroit infield in the mid-1930s was one of the best-hitting combinations in major league history. With Hank Greenberg at first, Gehringer at second, Billy Rogell at shortstop, and Marv Owen at third, the 1934 Tigers infield collected 769 hits (214 by Gehringer, 201 by Greenberg, 179 by Owen and 175 by Rogell), 462 RBI (139 by Greenberg, 127 by Gehringer, 100 by Rogell, and 96 by Owen), and 179 doubles (63 by Greenberg, 50 by Gehringer, 34 by Owen and 32 by Rogell). Three members of the 1934 Tigers infield (Gehringer, Owen and Rogell) played in all 154 games, and the fourth (Greenberg) played in 153.

Gehringer's 127 RBIs in 1934 is all the more remarkable given the fact that he played in the same lineup with one of the greatest RBI men of all time, Hank Greenberg. Gehringer later recalled that Greenberg would tell him: "Just get the runner over to third", so Hank could drive them in. Gehringer noted that "Hank loved those RBIs", to the point that Gehringer once kidded Greenberg: "You'd trip a runner coming around third base just so you could knock him in yourself."

The 1934 World Series was a match-up between St. Louis's "Gashouse Gang" and Detroit's' "G-Men" (so named because of stars Gehringer, Hank Greenberg, and Goose Goslin). Even 50 years later, Gehringer (interviewed in 1982) felt the Tigers were robbed of the 1934 championship by umpire Brick Owens. Detroit was ahead three games to two, and in Gehringer's view "we should've won the sixth game." Late in the game, Brick Owens called Mickey Cochrane out on a play at third base "even though all of the photographs show that he was safe by a mile." Gehringer insisted that, if Cochrane had been called safe, "we would've had the bases loaded with nobody out and we could've had a big inning." The Tigers wound up losing Game 6 by one run. They then lost Game 7 in an 11–0 shutout thrown by Dizzy Dean, despite a two-for-four game from Gehringer. Gehringer played all seven games of the 1934 World Series, batting .379 with an on-base percentage of .438 and a .517 slugging percentage.

In 1935, Gehringer and the Tigers won the World Series, beating the Chicago Cubs, four games to two. It was the Tigers' first World Series win, after failing in the fall classic in four previous appearances. For the year, Gehringer hit .330 with a .409 on-base percentage and a .502 slugging percentage, collecting 201 hits, 123 runs, 108 RBIs, and 19 home runs.

Gehringer also continued his consistent hitting into the 1935 World Series, where he played all six games, and hit .375 with a .423 on-base percentage, a .500 slugging percentage and four RBIs.

=== Life in the off-season ===
During the off-season, Gehringer worked as a sales clerk in the downtown Detroit Hudson's. He also spent many years barnstorming with other Major League players. One year, he traveled with a touring group from the Negro leagues, including Satchel Paige, Buck Leonard, Judy Johnson, and Mule Suttles. Gehringer recalled that trying to hit Paige's fastball and hesitation pitch was "no fun." Paige said that Gehringer was the best white hitter he ever pitched against.

=== Peak years (1936 and 1937) ===
Although the 1936 Tigers finished in second place, 19½ games behind the Yankees, the 33-year-old Gehringer had one of his best seasons. He led the majors with 60 doubles, one of only six times in major-league history that a batter has reached the 60-double mark. He led the American League in assists, double plays, and fielding percentage by a second baseman. And he had career highs in hits (227) slugging percentage (.555), runs (144), extra-base hits (87), total bases (356) and runs created (152). He also had a career-low 13 strikeouts in 641 at-bats during the 1936 season. He finished fourth in the American League Most Valuable Player (MVP) voting, as Lou Gehrig became the only non-Tiger to win the MVP award from 1934 to 1937.

In 1937, Gehringer won the American League batting crown with a career-high .371 batting average, 20 points ahead of second-place Lou Gehrig. He placed second to Gehrig with a .458 on-base percentage, collected 209 hits (his seventh 200-hit season), and scored 133 runs (one of twelve 100-plus run seasons). At the end of the season, he received the American League Most Valuable Player award, receiving six of the eight first-place votes and edging Joe DiMaggio by a total of 78 points to 74 points. At a banquet honoring Gehringer in November 1937, Detroit manager Mickey Cochrane said:

Gehringer is the ideal player from the managerial standpoint. He comes to training camp in the spring and says 'Hello, Mike, how are you.' Then Charley goes along through the season, bats .350 or better and, after the season, comes around and says – 'So long Mike, have a good winter.'

=== The "Mechanical Man" ===
Known for his consistency as a hitter and fielder, Gehringer was known as "The Mechanical Man". The earliest known contemporary account referring to Gehringer by the nickname is a May 1936 story crediting Lynwood Lary with creating the nickname and saying, "The guy just ain't human; he's a machine." The Brooklyn Daily Eagle at that time noted, "As steady as a turbine, Gehringer comes nearer to mechanical perfection than any infielder since the days of Napoleon Lajoie." Other sources credit New York Yankees pitcher Lefty Gomez with giving him the nickname. According to one source, Gomez said: "You wind him up in the spring, turn him loose, he hits .330 or .340, and you shut him off at the end of the season."

Gehringer was also durable, having compiled two of the longest consecutive game streaks in major-league history — a 511-game streak from September 3, 1927, to May 7, 1931, and a 504-game streak from June 25, 1932, to August 11, 1935.

=== Rogell and Gehringer ===
Gehringer played over 1,000 games with shortstop Billy Rogell, making them one of the longest-tenured double-play combinations in the history of the game. The pair led the league twice in double plays. (Another Tiger duo, Lou Whitaker and Alan Trammell, holds the major league record with 1,918 games played as a double-play combination.)

Rogell's fiery demeanor was a stark contrast to the calm, quiet demeanor of Gehringer. On one occasion, after both failed to cover second on a steal attempt, player-manager Mickey Cochrane charged out from behind the plate shouting at Rogell and Gehringer. As reported in The New Bill James Historical Baseball Abstract (2001): "Rogell, astonished, looked at Gehringer to see if he was going to say anything. Gehringer, of course, had nothing to say. 'Goddamn you,' yelled Rogell. 'Don't you come charging out here telling me how to play shortstop. You go back there and do the catching, and I'll play shortstop. If I'm not good enough, you can find someone else.' Cochrane went back to his own position."

=== 1938 to 1939 ===
In 1938, Gehringer was selected as the starting second baseman for the American League All-Star team for the sixth consecutive year. He was the only person to play every inning of the first six All-Star games. He batted .500 and did not strike out or commit an error in his six All-Star games.

Gehringer hit a career-high 20 home runs in 1938 and again ranked among the American League's leaders with 133 runs scored (third), a .425 on-base percentage (sixth), and 113 bases on balls (fourth). Gehringer finished tenth in the AL MVP voting in 1938.

Gehringer had another strong season in 1939. For the sixth time in his career, he led the American League second baseman in fielding percentage (.977), and he ranked among the league leaders in batting with a .325 batting average (ninth in AL), .423 on-base percentage (8th in AL), and .544 slugging percentage (seventh in AL).

=== Back problems (1940 and 1941) ===
Gehringer suffered from chronic back trouble. According to one account, he injured his back while shoveling snow. The trouble was such that there were doubts as to whether he would be able to play at all in 1940. Gehringer later recalled his struggles during the 1940 season: "Anytime I tried to field a ball off to either side I felt I'd collapse. Often I couldn't stoop over to pick up a ball after blocking it. I've had so many heat treatments I feel like a boiled oyster. At times I didn't think I could move two steps or get the bat off my shoulder." Despite that back pain, Gehringer started 138 games at second base in 1940 and compiled a .313 batting average. The Tigers won the American League pennant in 1940, but lost to the Cincinnati Reds in the 1940 World Series. Gehringer's back problems were such that, by the time of the World Series, he "covered little ground and seldom got the break on the ball." After Game 7, Gehringer announced that he had likely played his final season noting, "Playing ball was torture for me. I was in agony nearly the entire time."

During the off-season, Gehringer attempted new treatments, felt better, and returned for the 1941 season. He started 115 games at second base and registered a .982 fielding percentage, best in the American League. However, his batting average dropped almost 100 points from .313 in 1940 to .220 in 1941. His defensive prowess also suffered, with Detroit sports writer Watson Spoelstra noting in July that "ground balls that once were easy for him are filtering through for base hits."

=== Coach in 1942 ===
Gehringer decided to retire after the 1941 season. In January 1942, he signed a contract to return to the club as a nonplaying coach assigned to coaching infielders and batters. In late May 1942, Gehringer was restored to the active list, allowing him to be available for pinch-hitting duty. He appeared in 45 games in 1942, compiling a .267 batting average in 45 at bats. He also played 16 innings at second base without an error.

=== Career statistics ===
| G | AB | R | H | 2B | 3B | HR | RBI | SB | BB | AVG | OBP | SLG | OPS | TB | FLD% |
|---|---|---|---|---|---|---|---|---|---|---|---|---|---|---|---|
| 2,323 | 8,860 | 1,775 | 2,839 | 574 | 146 | 184 | 1,427 | 181 | 1,186 | .320 | .404 | .480 | .884 | 4,257 | .976 |

- In 20 World Series games (1934, 1935, and 1940), Gehringer hit .321 (26-for-81) with 12 runs, 4 doubles, 1 home run, 7 RBI, 2 stolen bases, and 7 walks.
- He has recorded six 5-hit games and 52 4-hit games in his MLB career.
- He was difficult to strike out, fanning only 372 times in 8,860 at-bats, or once every 23.8 at-bats.

== Military service and retirement from baseball ==
Following the United States' entry into World War II, baseball players began to be inducted into the military service. In August 1942, the 39-year-old Gehringer reported for a physical examination at the Navy's procurement headquarters in Detroit. At a ceremony in Detroit on December 1, 1942, he was inducted into the Navy as a lieutenant. At the time, Gehringer told reporters, "I think it may be the end of baseball for me."

Gehringer was assigned to the Navy's Pre-Flight School at Saint Mary's College of California. He played second base for the St. Mary's Pre-Flight baseball team. He was also the head baseball and soccer coach at the St. Mary's Pre-Flight School.

Gehringer was later transferred to the Navy's Pre-Flight School in Chapel Hill, North Carolina, and in February 1945 to Jacksonville, Florida. In 1945, he led the Jacksonville Naval Air Station Fliers baseball team to a 24–5 record and compiled a .438 batting average.

Gehringer was discharged from the Navy on November 7, 1945, with the rank of lieutenant commander. Upon his release, he was 42 years old and announced his retirement from baseball and his intention to return to work at Gehringer & Forsyth, a manufacturers' agency he formed in 1938 with a friend. He confirmed his retirement at Briggs Stadium in January 1946, signing his "Application for Voluntary Retirement from Organized Baseball". Gehringer later recalled, "I came out of the service in such good shape that I felt I could've played a few years."

== Family and later years ==
=== Relationship with mother ===
Gehringer's father died in July 1924. Upon his father's death, Gehringer moved his mother from the family farm outside Fowlerville, Michigan, to live with him in Detroit. Gehringer noted that his mother was a "great fan" who would either come out to the ballpark to watch him play or listen to Harry Heilmann's radio broadcasts on the porch. His mother died in July 1946.

=== Wedding and Hall of Fame ===
In the regular voting in 1949 for the Baseball Hall of Fame, Gehringer finished in first place with 102 out of 153 votes, but it fell short of the required 75 percent. The baseball writers decided to conduct a run-off election in May 1949. Gehringer was selected by 159 of the 187 writers (85%) in the runoff voting, qualifying him for the Hall of Fame. Gehringer did not attend the induction ceremony in Cooperstown, New York, as it was held five days before his wedding. He was married in June 1949 to Josephine Stillen, a secretary at the Nash-Kelvinator Corp. The ceremony was held in Santa Clara, California. The couple remained married until Gehringer's death more than four decades later.

=== Tigers' general manager ===
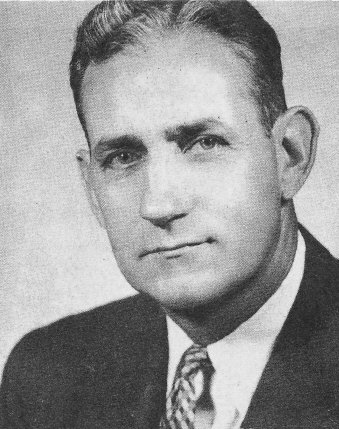
Gehringer as Detroit Tigers vice-president (1957)

In July 1951, Gehringer was hired as the Tigers' vice president and general manager, effective after the 1951 season. In his first year as general manager, the 1952 Detroit Tigers finished in last place (50–104 record) for the first time in club history. Although manager Red Rolfe did not survive the disappointing season, having been fired in July, the club's board of directors in September 1952 gave Gehringer a unanimous vote of confidence.

The 1953 team improved only marginally, finishing with a 60–94 record, 40½ games behind the New York Yankees. After another disappointing season, Gehringer was replaced as general manager in October 1953. Although the team's on-field performance was poor during Gehringer's time as general manager, Lyall Smith of the Detroit Free Press praised Gehringer for his trades that helped rebuild the club and brought 21 players to the team, including Walt Dropo, Fred Hatfield, Johnny Pesky, Ned Garver, Jim Delsing, Ray Boone, and Steve Gromek.

Gehringer later described his time as general manager as a "nightmare." As he put it: "We had a lousy ball club, and I'd been away from baseball at that time for ten years. I didn't know who was and who wasn't."

Gehringer remained a vice president with the Tigers during parts of the 1950s. He was the first Detroit official to scout Al Kaline. After watching Kaline in a high-school all-star game, Gehringer returned to Detroit "raving about the kid" and assigned scout Ed Katalinas to continue watching him.

Gehringer returned to the Tigers in 1963 as a fielding instructor to the team's young second baseman Dick McAuliffe and as a batting instructor.

=== Later years and honors ===
After his playing career ended, Gehringer returned to Gehringer & Forsyth, a manufacturer's agent for companies making automobile interior furnishings, including Burlington Automotive Fabrics, Barform carpets, and Cadillac Rubber & Plastics. In 1967, the company built the three-story, contemporary Gehringer & Forsyth building on Woodward Avenue north of Long Lake Road in Bloomfield Hills, Michigan.

Gehringer also served as a member of the Baseball Hall of Fame's Committee on Baseball Veterans from 1953 to 1990. He also served on the Hall of Fame's board of directors until 1991.

At a June 1983 ceremony in Tiger Stadium, the Tigers retired uniform numbers 2 and 5, worn for many years by teammates Gehringer and Hank Greenberg respectively. Both players attended the ceremony.

At age 82, Gehringer served as the American League honorary captain at the 1986 Major League Baseball All-Star Game at the Astrodome in Houston, Texas.

Gehringer suffered from a stroke in December 1992 and died the following month at age 89 at a nursing home in Bloomfield Hills.

=== Posthumous honors ===
In 1999, Gehringer ranked Number 46 on The Sporting News list of the 100 Greatest Baseball Players, and was nominated as a finalist for the Major League Baseball All-Century Team. Also in 1999, Sports Illustrated published a list of "The 50 Greatest Sports Figures from Michigan" (in all sports), and ranked Gehringer third on the list behind Joe Louis and Magic Johnson.

In 2013, the Bob Feller Act of Valor Award honored Gehringer as one of 37 Baseball Hall of Fame members for his service in the United States Navy during World War II.

=== John Smoltz ===
Gehringer is a distant cousin of fellow MLB Hall of Famer John Smoltz.

== See also ==
- List of Major League Baseball batting champions
- List of Major League Baseball players who spent their entire career with one franchise

| Preceded by Sam Chapman | Hitting for the cycle May 27, 1939 | Succeeded by Arky Vaughan |
