= Nyesville, Indiana =

Unincorporated community in Indiana, United States

- Unincorporated community
- Parke County's location in Indiana

- Location in Parke County
- Coordinates: 39°47′04″N 87°10′28″W
- Country: United States
- State: Indiana
- County: Parke
- Township: Washington
- Elevation: 715 ft (218 m)
- Time zone: UTC-5 (Eastern (EST))
  - Summer (DST): UTC-4 (EDT)
- ZIP code: 47872
- Area code: 765
- GNIS feature ID: 440380

Nyesville, also known as Nowlington, is an unincorporated community in Washington Township, Parke County, in the U.S. state of Indiana.

== History ==
Nyesville had it start as a coal town. It was platted in 1871. A post office was established at Nyesville in 1872, and remained in operation until 1902.

== Geography ==
Nyesville is located at 39°47′04″N 87°10′28″W at an elevation of 715 feet.

== Notable people ==
- Mordecai Brown, former Chicago Cubs pitcher and a member of the Baseball Hall of Fame, was born in Nyesville.
- Oscar R. Cauldwell, decorated United States Marine Corps Major general during World War II.
