= List of New York Yankees in the Baseball Hall of Fame =

The New York Yankees are a Major League Baseball team based in The Bronx, New York. The team competes as a member club of the American League (AL) East division. Established in 1901 as the Baltimore Orioles (no relation to the modern Baltimore Orioles), the team relocated to New York in 1903 as the New York Highlanders, they officially renamed to their current name in 1913.

A total of 61 players, managers, and executives (24 of whom are inducted as Yankees) in the National Baseball Hall of Fame and Museum, plus seven broadcasters who have received the Hall's Ford C. Frick Award, spent part or all of their professional careers with the Yankees.

== Key ==
†	Inducted as a Yankee

== List ==
=== Inductees ===
Player	Years with Yankees	Role(s) with Yankees	Inducted as	Year inducted	Vote%	Ballot or Election type
Home Run Baker	1916–1919, 1921–1922	Player	Player	1955		Veteran's Committee
Ed Barrow	1920–1945	Executive	Executive	1953		Veteran's Committee
Carlos Beltrán	2014–2016	Player	Player	2026	84.2%	4th Ballot
Yogi Berra^{†}	1946–1964, 1984–1985	Player, coach, manager	Player	1972	85.61%	2nd Ballot
Wade Boggs	1993–1997	Player	Player	2005	91.9%	1st Ballot
Roger Bresnahan	1901–1902	Player	Player	1945		Veterans Committee
Frank Chance	1913–1914	Player	Player	1946		Veterans Committee
Jack Chesbro^{†}	1903–1909	Player	Player	1946		Veterans Committee
Earle Combs^{†}	1924–1935	Player	Player	1970		Veterans Committee
Stan Coveleski	1928	Player	Player	1969		Veterans Committee
Bobby Cox	1968–1969, 1977	Player, coach	Manager	2014	100%	Expansion Era Committee
Bill Dickey^{†}	1928–1943, 1946	Player	Player	1954	80.16%	7th Ballot
Joe DiMaggio^{†}	1936–1942, 1946–1951	Player	Player	1955	88.84%	3rd Ballot
Leo Durocher	1925, 1928–1929	Player	Manager	1994		Veterans Committee
Whitey Ford^{†}	1950, 1953–1967	Player	Player	1974	77.81%	2nd Ballot
Lou Gehrig^{†}	1923–1939	Player	Player	1939		Special Election
Lefty Gomez^{†}	1930–1942	Player	Player	1972		Veteran's Committee
Joe Gordon^{†}	1938–1946	Player	Player	2009	83.3%	Veteran's Committee
Goose Gossage^{†}	1978–1983	Player	Player	2008	85.8%	9th Ballot
Clark Griffith	1903–1907	Player	Executive	1946		Veteran's Committee
Burleigh Grimes	1934	Player	Player	1964		Veteran's Committee
Bucky Harris	1947–1948	Manager	Manager	1975		Veteran's Committee
Rickey Henderson	1985–1989	Player	Player	2009	94.8%	1st Ballot
Waite Hoyt^{†}	1921–1930	Player	Player	1969		Veteran's Committee
Miller Huggins^{†}	1918–1929	Manager	Manager	1964		Veteran's Committee
Catfish Hunter	1975-1979	Player	Player	1987	76.27%	3rd Ballot
Reggie Jackson^{†}	1977–1981	Player	Player	1993	93.6%	1st Ballot
Derek Jeter^{†}	1995–2014	Player	Player	2020	99.75%	1st Ballot
Randy Johnson	2005–2006	Player	Player	2015	97.3%	1st Ballot
Andruw Jones	2011–2012	Player	Player	2026	78.4%	9th Ballot
Willie Keeler	1903–1909	Player	Player	1939	75.5%	4th Ballot
Tony Lazzeri^{†}	1926–1937	Player	Player	1991		Veterans Committee
Bob Lemon	1978–1979, 1981–1982	Manager	Player	1976	78.61%	12th Ballot
Larry MacPhail	1945–1947	Executive	Executive	1978		Veterans Committee
Lee MacPhail	1966–1974	Executive	Executive	1998		Veterans Committee
Mickey Mantle^{†}	1951–1968	Player	Player	1974	88.2%	1st Ballot
Joe McCarthy^{†}	1931–1946	Manager	Manager	1957		Veterans Committee
Joe McGinnity	1901–1902	Player	Player	1946		Veterans Committee
John McGraw	1901–1902	Player	Manager	1937		Veterans Committee
Bill McKechnie	1913	Player	Player	1962		Veterans Committee
Johnny Mize	1949–1953	Player	Player	1981		Veterans Committee
Mike Mussina	2001–2008	Player	Player	2019	76.7%	6th Ballot
Phil Niekro	1984–1985	Player	Player	1997	80.34%	5th Ballot
Herb Pennock^{†}	1923–1933	Player	Player	1948	77.69%	8th Ballot
Gaylord Perry	1980	Player	Player	1991	77.2%	3rd Ballot
Tim Raines	1996–1998	Player	Player	2017	86.0%	10th Ballot
Branch Rickey	1907	Player	Executive	1967		Veterans Committee
Mariano Rivera^{†}	1995–2013	Player	Player	2019	100.00%	1st Ballot
Phil Rizzuto^{†}	1941–1942, 1946–1956	Player	Player	1994		Veterans Committee
Wilbert Robinson	1901–1902	Player, manager	Manager	1945		Veterans Committee
Iván Rodríguez	2008	Player	Player	2017	76%	1st Ballot
Red Ruffing^{†}	1930–1942, 1945–1946	Player	Player	1967	86.93%	15th Ballot
Jacob Ruppert	1915–1939	Executive	Executive	2013	93.8%	Pre-Integration Era Committee
Babe Ruth^{†}	1920–1934	Player	Player	1936	95.13%	1st Ballot (inaugural)
CC Sabathia^{†}	2009–2019	Player	Player	2025	86.8%	1st Ballot
Joe Sewell	1931–1933	Player	Player	1977		Veterans Committee
Enos Slaughter	1954–1959	Player	Player	1985		Veterans Committee
Lee Smith	1993	Player	Player	2019	100%	Today's Game Committee
Casey Stengel^{†}	1949–1960	Manager	Manager	1966		Veterans Committee
Ichiro Suzuki	2012–2014	Player	Player	2025	99.75%	1st Ballot
Joe Torre^{†}	1996–2007	Manager	Manager	2014	100%	Expansion Era Committee
Dazzy Vance	1915, 1918	Player	Player	1955	81.7%	16th Ballot
Paul Waner	1944–1945	Player	Player	1952	83.33%	5th Ballot
George Weiss	1947–1960	Executive	Executive	1971		Veterans Committee
Dave Winfield	1981–1988, 1990	Player	Player	2001	84.5%	1st Ballot

=== Honored broadcasters ===
The Frick Award, according to the Hall, "is presented annually to a broadcaster for 'major contributions to baseball.' " The Hall explicitly states that Frick honorees are not members of the Hall.

Broadcaster	Years with Yankees	Year of award
Mel Allen	1939–1964	1978
Red Barber	1954–1966	1978
Jerry Coleman	1949–1957	2005
Joe Garagiola	1965–1967	1991
Curt Gowdy	1949–1950	1984
Ken Harrelson	1987–1988	2020
Al Helfer	1937–1938, 1945	2019
Russ Hodges	1946–1948	1980

== See also ==
- List of St. Louis Cardinals in the Baseball Hall of Fame
- List of Los Angeles Dodgers in the Baseball Hall of Fame
