= List of Los Angeles Dodgers in the Baseball Hall of Fame =

The Los Angeles Dodgers are a Major League Baseball team based in Los Angeles. The team is in the Western Division of the National League. Established in 1883, the team originated in Brooklyn, where it was known as the Brooklyn Dodgers, before moving to Los Angeles for the 1958 season.

A total of 59 players, managers, and executives in the National Baseball Hall of Fame and Museum, plus four broadcasters who have received the Hall's Ford C. Frick Award, spent some or part of their professional careers with the Los Angeles Dodgers

== Hall of Famers ==
Hall of Famer Sandy Koufax

Key

* - Also served as a Dodger manager ** - Also served as a Dodger coach *** - Also served as club president from 1925–29

†	Inducted as a Dodger

Player	Years with Dodgers	Role with Dodgers	Inducted as	Year inducted	Vote%	Ballot or Election type
Dick Allen	1971	Player	Player	2025	81.3%	Classic Baseball Era Committee
Walter Alston^{†}	1954–76	Manager	Manager	1983		Veteran's Committee
Dave Bancroft	1928–29	Player	Player	1971		Veteran's Committee
Adrián Beltré	1998–2004	Player	Player	2024	95.1%	1st Ballot
Dan Brouthers	1892–93	Player	Player	1945		Veteran's Committee
Jim Bunning	1969	Player	Player	1996		Veteran's Committee
Roy Campanella^{†}	1948–57	Player	Player	1969	79.41%	7th Ballot
Max Carey*	1926–29	Player	Player	1961		Veteran's Committee
Gary Carter	1991	Player	Player	2003	78.02%	6th Ballot
Kiki Cuyler	1938	Player	Player	1968		Veteran's Committee
Don Drysdale^{†}	1956–69	Player	Player	1984	78.41%	10th Ballot
Leo Durocher*^{†}	1938–41, 43, 45	Player	Manager	1994		Veteran's Committee
Burleigh Grimes*^{†}	1918–26	Player	Player	1964		Veteran's Committee
Ned Hanlon	1899–1905	Manager	Manager	1996		Veteran's Committee
Rickey Henderson	2003	Player	Player	2009	94.8%	1st Ballot
Billy Herman**	1941–43, 46	Player	Player	1975		Veteran's Committee
Gil Hodges^{†}	1943, 47–61	Player	Player	2022		Golden Days Era Committee
Waite Hoyt	1932, 37–38	Player	Player	1969		Veteran's Committee
Hughie Jennings	1899–1900, 03	Player	Player	1945		Veteran's Committee
Andruw Jones	2008	Player	Player	2026	78.4%	9th Ballot
Willie Keeler^{†}	1893, 1899–1902	Player	Player	1939	75.5%	4th Ballot
Joe Kelley	1899–1901	Player	Player	1971		Veteran's Committee
George Kelly	1932	Player	Player	1973		Veteran's Committee
Jeff Kent	2005–08	Player	Player	2026	87.5%	Contemporary Baseball Era Committee
Sandy Koufax^{†}	1955–66	Player	Player	1972	86.87%	1st Ballot
Tommy Lasorda^{†}	1977–96	Manager	Manager	1997		Veteran's Committee
Tony Lazzeri	1939	Player	Player	1991		Veteran's Committee
Fred Lindstrom	1936	Player	Player	1976		Veteran's Committee
Ernie Lombardi	1931	Player	Player	1986		Veteran's Committee
Al Lopez	1928, 30–35	Player	Manager	1977		Veteran's Committee
Larry MacPhail	1938–42	Executive	Executive	1978		Veteran's Committee
Greg Maddux	2006, 2008	Player	Player	2014	97.2%	1st Ballot
Heinie Manush	1937–38	Player	Player	1964		Veteran's Committee
Rabbit Maranville	1926	Player	Player	1954	82.94%	14th Ballot
Juan Marichal	1975	Player	Player	1983	83.7%	3rd Ballot
Rube Marquard	1915–20	Player	Player	1971		Veteran's Committee
Pedro Martínez	1992–93	Player	Player	2015	91.1%	1st Ballot
Thomas McCarthy	1896	Player	Player	1946		Veteran's Committee
Joe McGinnity**	1900	Player	Player	1946		Veteran's Committee
Fred McGriff	2003	Player	Player	2023	100%	Contemporary Baseball Era Committee
Joe Medwick	1940–43, 46	Player	Player	1968	84.81%	8th Ballot
Eddie Murray	1989–91, 97	Player	Player	2003	85.3%	1st Ballot
Walter O'Malley	1950–79	Executive	Executive	2008		Veteran's Committee
Mike Piazza	1992–98	Player	Player	2016	83.0%	4th Ballot
Pee Wee Reese^{†}	1940–42, 46–58	Player	Player	1984		Veteran's Committee
Branch Rickey	1942–50	Executive	Executive	1967		Veteran's Committee
Frank Robinson	1972	Player	Player	1982	89.2%	1st Ballot
Jackie Robinson^{†}	1947–56	Player	Player	1962	77.5%	1st Ballot
Wilbert Robinson***^{†}	1914–31	Manager	Manager	1945		Veteran's Committee
Duke Snider^{†}	1947–62	Player	Player	1980	86.49%	11th Ballot
Casey Stengel*	1912–17	Player	Manager	1966		Veteran's Committee
Don Sutton^{†}	1966–80, 88	Player	Player	1998	81.6%	5th Ballot
Jim Thome	2009	Player	Player	2018	89.8%	1st Ballot
Joe Torre	2008-10	Manager	Manager	2014	100%	Expansion Era Committee
Dazzy Vance^{†}	1922–32, 35	Player	Player	1955	81.7%	16th Ballot
Arky Vaughan	1942–43, 47–48	Player	Player	1985		Veteran's Committee
Lloyd Waner	1944	Player	Player	1967		Veteran's Committee
Paul Waner	1941, 43–44	Player	Player	1952	83.33%	7th Ballot
John Montgomery Ward*	1891–92	Player	Player	1964		Veteran's Committee
Zack Wheat^{†}	1909–26	Player	Player	1959		Veteran's Committee
Hoyt Wilhelm	1971–72	Player	Player	1985	83.8%	8th Ballot
Hack Wilson	1932–34	Player	Player	1979		Veteran's Committee

== Honored broadcasters ==
The Frick Award, according to the Hall, "is presented annually to a broadcaster for 'major contributions to baseball.' " The Hall explicitly states that Frick honorees are not members of the Hall.

Broadcaster	Years with Dodgers	Year of award
Red Barber	1939–1953	1978
Ernie Harwell	1948–1949	1981
Jaime Jarrín	1959–2022	1998
Vin Scully	1950–2016	1982

== See also ==
- List of St. Louis Cardinals in the Baseball Hall of Fame
- List of New York Yankees in the Baseball Hall of Fame
