= Vic Willis =

American baseball player (1876–1947)

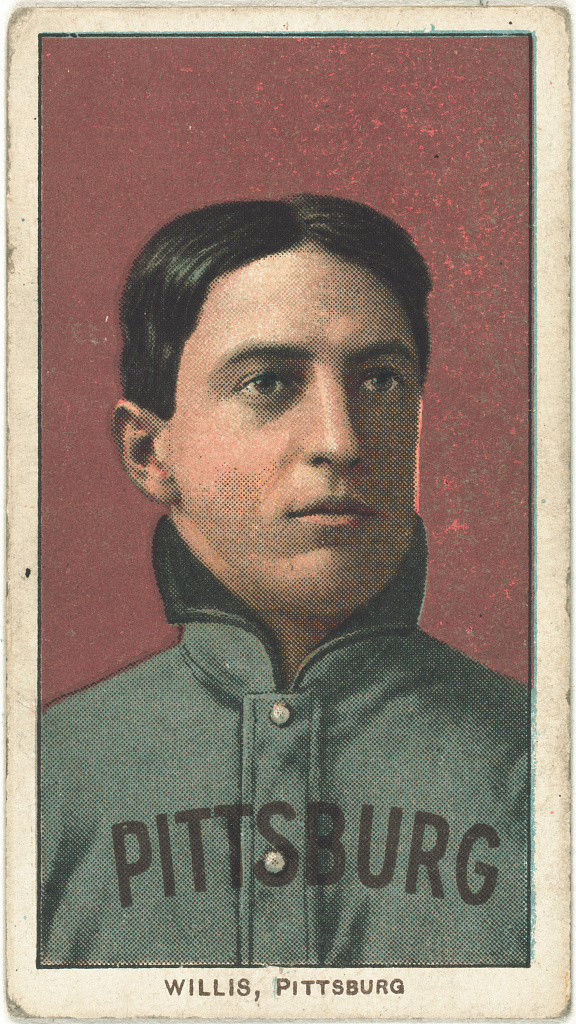
- Willis in 1909
- Pitcher
- Born: April 12, 1876; Cecil County, Maryland, U.S.
- Died: August 3, 1947 (aged 71); Elkton, Maryland, U.S.
- Batted: Right Threw: Right

MLB debut
- April 20, 1898, for the Boston Beaneaters

Last MLB appearance
- September 5, 1910, for the St. Louis Cardinals

MLB statistics
- Win–loss record: 249–205
- Earned run average: 2.63
- Strikeouts: 1,651
- Stats at Baseball Reference

Teams
- Boston Beaneaters (1898–1905); Pittsburgh Pirates (1906–1909); St. Louis Cardinals (1910)

Career highlights and awards
- World Series champion (1909); MLB ERA leader (1899); MLB strikeout leader (1902); Pitched a no-hitter on August 7, 1899

Member of the National

Baseball Hall of Fame
- Induction: 1995
- Election method: Veterans Committee

Victor Gazaway Willis (April 12, 1876 – August 3, 1947) was an American Major League Baseball (MLB) pitcher. He played for the Boston Beaneaters, Pittsburgh Pirates, and St. Louis Cardinals in 13 seasons in the National League (NL) from 1898 to 1910. In 513 career games, Willis pitched 3,996 innings and posted a win–loss record of 249–205, with 388 complete games, 50 shutouts, and a 2.63 earned run average (ERA). Nicknamed "the Delaware Peach", he was inducted into the National Baseball Hall of Fame in 1995.

== Early life ==
Willis was born on April 12, 1876, in Cecil County, Maryland. He moved to Newark, Delaware, as a young boy, where he attended school. He attended high school at Newark Academy and played both on the high school baseball team and in semi-pro baseball leagues throughout Delaware. Prior to joining the major leagues, Willis played football and baseball for the University of Delaware, then known as Delaware College, despite never attending the college. This was due to their low enrollment at the time, which allowed them to add local talent to fill out their roster.

Willis began his professional baseball career in 1895 with the Harrisburg Senators of the Pennsylvania State League. After the team ceased operations in June, he moved to the Lynchburg Hill Climbers of the Virginia State League. The following year, he was promoted to the Syracuse Stars of the Eastern League. He finished the season with a 10–6 win–loss record, but had spent most of the season battling illness, which caused him to end his season in July. Willis returned to the Stars for the 1897 season and, after establishing a curveball in the offseason, finished the season with 21 wins, with Syracuse winning the league championship in the process. After the season ended, he was purchased by the Boston Beaneaters for Fred Lake and $1,000. The Beaneaters acquired Willis to fill the void left by Jack Stivetts, who was near retirement due to an arm injury.

== Major League Baseball career ==
Willis began his major league career with the Beaneaters on April 20, 1898, in a relief appearance against the Baltimore Orioles, allowing eight runs, three walks, and a wild pitch in an 18–2 loss while also hitting two batters. In his next appearance, he beat the Washington Senators, 11–4, in his first career start. He remained in the starting rotation throughout the season but at times struggled with his control. In one game against the Philadelphia Phillies, opposing pitcher Red Donahue threw a no-hitter, while Willis allowed eight walks in a 5–0 loss. He finished the season with 25 wins, 13 losses, a 2.84 ERA, 148 walks, and 160 strikeouts. He finished second in walks and third in strikeouts in the National League. In 1899, Willis became the last pitcher to throw a no-hitter in the 1800s.

Despite being a Hall of Fame pitcher, Willis holds the post-1900 single season records for most losses (29) and most complete game losses (25); both records were set in 1905. For the three seasons from 1903 to 1905, Willis compiled a dismal record with the Beaneaters of 42 wins against 72 losses. However, his earned run average during those three years averaged 3.02, and in two of those years his ERA was under 3.00. Despite Willis' performance on the mound during those three seasons, the Boston offense could only muster a combined .238 batting average over those seasons. When he changed teams to the Pittsburgh Pirates for 1906, whose offense had a combined batting average of .256 over the four years Willis was with the team, he compiled a record of 88–46. His ERA for those four years was 2.08.

Willis was on one World Series championship team, the 1909 Pirates. He lost one game during the Series pitching against Ty Cobb's Detroit Tigers. Willis' final major league season was 1910, with the St. Louis Cardinals. The following season, he pitched for a semipro team in his hometown of Newark, Delaware.

== Later life ==
After retiring from baseball, Willis purchased and operated the Washington House, a hotel in Newark, Delaware. Willis died in 1947 and is interred in St. John Cemetery in Newark.

In 1977 he was inducted into the Delaware Sports Hall of Fame. The National Baseball Hall of Fame inducted him in 1995.

== See also ==
- List of Major League Baseball career wins leaders
- List of Major League Baseball career ERA leaders
- List of Major League Baseball career shutout leaders
- List of Major League Baseball career hit batsmen leaders
- List of Major League Baseball annual ERA leaders
- List of Major League Baseball annual strikeout leaders
- List of Major League Baseball annual shutout leaders
- List of Major League Baseball annual saves leaders
- List of Major League Baseball no-hitters

Achievements
Preceded by Deacon Phillippe	No-hitter pitcher August 7, 1899	Succeeded by Noodles Hahn
