= 1995 Baseball Hall of Fame balloting =

Elections to the Baseball Hall of Fame

National Baseball

Hall of Fame and Museum
- New inductees: 5
- via BBWAA: 1
- via Veterans Committee: 4
- Total inductees: 224
- Induction date: July 30, 1995

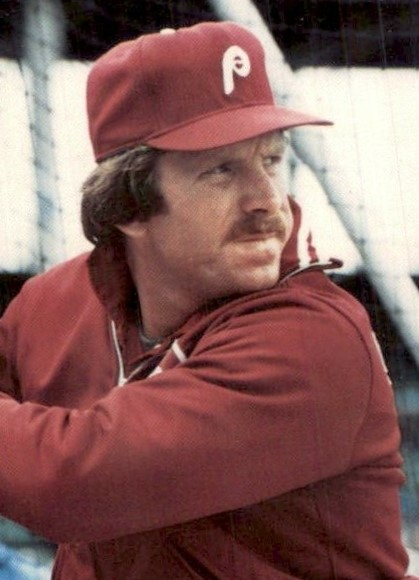
1995 BBWAA inductee Mike Schmidt

Elections to the Baseball Hall of Fame for 1995 introduced a system of multiple classified ballots for consideration by the Veterans Committee. That group met in closed sessions as usual and selected four people: Richie Ashburn, Leon Day, William Hulbert, and Vic Willis. Day and Hulbert were named from the new ballots for Negro leagues and 19th century figures.

The Baseball Writers' Association of America (BBWAA) voted by mail, per their usual process, to select from recent major league players; they elected Mike Schmidt. A formal induction ceremony was held in Cooperstown, New York, on July 30, 1995.

== BBWAA election ==
The BBWAA was authorized to elect players active in 1975 or later, but not after 1989; the ballot included candidates from the 1994 ballot who received at least 5% of the vote but were not elected, along with selected players, chosen by a screening committee, whose last appearance was in 1990. All 10-year members of the BBWAA were eligible to vote.

Voters were instructed to cast votes for up to 10 candidates; any candidate receiving votes on at least 75% of the ballots would be honored with induction to the Hall. The ballot consisted of 39 players; a total of 460 ballots were cast, with 345 votes required for election. A total of 2,829 individual votes were cast, an average of 6.15 per ballot. Those candidates receiving less than 5% of the vote (23 votes) will not appear on future BBWAA ballots, but may eventually be considered by the Veterans Committee.

Candidates who were eligible for the first time are indicated here with a dagger (†). The one candidate who received at least 75% of the vote and was elected is indicated in bold italics; candidates who have since been elected in subsequent elections are indicated in italics. The 14 candidates who received less than 5% of the vote, thus becoming ineligible for future BBWAA consideration, are indicated with an asterisk (*).

Thurman Munson was on the ballot for the 15th and final time.

Key to colors
Elected to the Hall. These individuals are also indicated in **bold italics**.
Players who were elected in future elections. These individuals are also indicated in plain italics.
Players not yet elected who returned on the 1996 ballot.
Eliminated from future BBWAA voting. These individuals remain eligible for future Veterans Committee consideration.

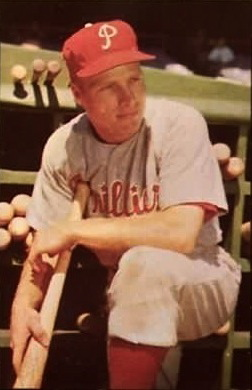
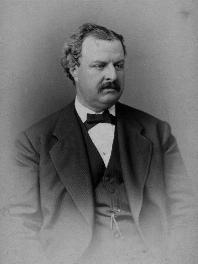
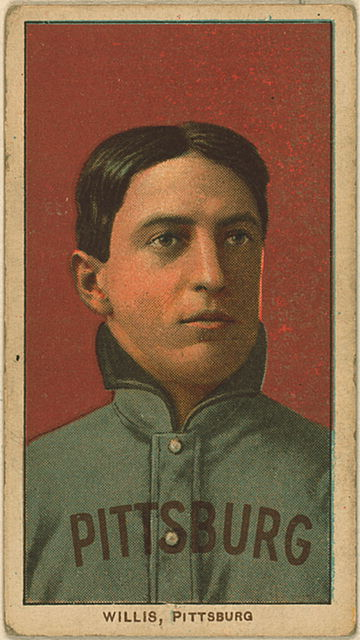
1995 Veterans Committee inductees (L-R): Richie Ashburn, William Hulbert, and Vic Willis

Player	Votes	Percent	Change	Year
**Mike Schmidt**†	**444**	**96.5**	-	1st
Phil Niekro	286	62.2	▲2.3%	3rd
Don Sutton	264	57.4	▲0.6%	2nd
Tony Pérez	259	56.3	▼1.4%	4th
Steve Garvey	196	42.6	▲6.2%	3rd
Tony Oliva	149	32.4	▼2.2%	14th
Ron Santo	139	30.2	▼2.7%	12th
Jim Rice†	137	29.8	-	1st
Bruce Sutter	137	29.8	▲5.9%	2nd
Jim Kaat	100	21.7	▲0.2%	7th
Tommy John†	98	21.3	-	1st
Dick Allen	72	15.7	▲1.2%	13th
Minnie Miñoso	66	14.3	▲4.4%	11th
Curt Flood	59	12.8	▲4.2%	14th
Joe Torre	50	10.9	▼0.7%	13th
Luis Tiant	45	9.8	▲0.6%	8th
Dave Concepción	43	9.3	▲2.5%	2nd
Bobby Bonds	35	7.6	▼0.5%	9th
Vada Pinson	32	7.0	▼3.1%	14th
Thurman Munson	30	6.5	▲0.3%	15th
Graig Nettles	28	6.1	▼2.2%	2nd
Vida Blue	26	5.7	▲2.6%	4th
Mickey Lolich	26	5.7	▲0.7%	11th
Ron Guidry	25	5.4	▲0.1%	2nd
Rusty Staub	23	5.0	▼2.9%	5th
George Foster*	19	4.1	▲0.6%	4th
Don Baylor*	12	2.6	-	2nd
Buddy Bell†*	8	1.7	-	1st
Darrell Evans†*	8	1.7	-	1st
Kent Tekulve†*	6	1.3	-	1st
Bob Forsch†*	2	0.4	-	1st
Willie Hernández†*	2	0.4	-	1st
Mike Krukow†*	1	0.2	-	1st
Chris Speier†*	1	0.2	-	1st
Jim Sundberg†*	1	0.2	-	1st
Doyle Alexander†*	0	0.0	-	1st
Greg Gross†*	0	0.0	-	1st
Rick Rhoden†*	0	0.0	-	1st
Manny Trillo†*	0	0.0	-	1st

The newly eligible players included 24 All-Stars, eleven of whom were not included on the ballot, representing a total of 67 All-Star selections. Among the new candidates were 12-time All-Star Mike Schmidt, 8-time All-Star Jim Rice and 5-time All-Star Buddy Bell. The field included three MVPs (Schmidt, Rice and Willie Hernández) and one Cy Young Award winner (Hernández).

Players eligible for the first time who were not included on the ballot were: Luis Aguayo, Neil Allen, Tony Armas, Alan Ashby, Bruce Benedict, Mike Davis, Bob Dernier, Bo Díaz, Leon Durham, Tim Flannery, Damaso Garcia, Jerry Hairston, Sr., Glenn Hubbard, Lee Mazzilli, Keith Moreland, Dwayne Murphy, David Palmer, Shane Rawley, Craig Reynolds, Harry Spilman, Bob Stanley, Tim Stoddard, Steve Trout, Ron Washington, and Joel Youngblood.

In addition to Schmidt, Phillies broadcaster and former center fielder Richie Ashburn was inducted to the hall by the Veteran's Committee. Phillie fans were elated over the results, and came to Cooperstown that July in droves.

== Veterans Committee ==
The Veterans Committee met in closed sessions to elect as many as two executives, managers, umpires, and older major league players—the categories considered in all its meetings since 1953. By a new arrangement it separately considered candidates from the Negro leagues and from the 19th century with authority to select one from each of those two special ballots.

The committee elected four people, the maximum number permitted: center fielder Richie Ashburn from the 1950s, pitcher Vic Willis from the 1900s, pitcher Leon Day from the Negro leagues, and from the 19th century William Hulbert, the founder and second president of the National League.

== J. G. Taylor Spink Award ==
There was no Spink Award to a baseball writer in 1995 (none voted at the December 1994 meeting at the BBWAA).

== Ford C. Frick Award ==
Bob Wolff received the Ford C. Frick Award honoring a baseball broadcaster.
