= 1949 Baseball Hall of Fame balloting =

Elections to the Baseball Hall of Fame

National Baseball

Hall of Fame and Museum
- New inductees: 3
- via BBWAA: 1
- via Old Timers Committee: 2
- Total inductees: 58
- Induction date: June 13, 1949

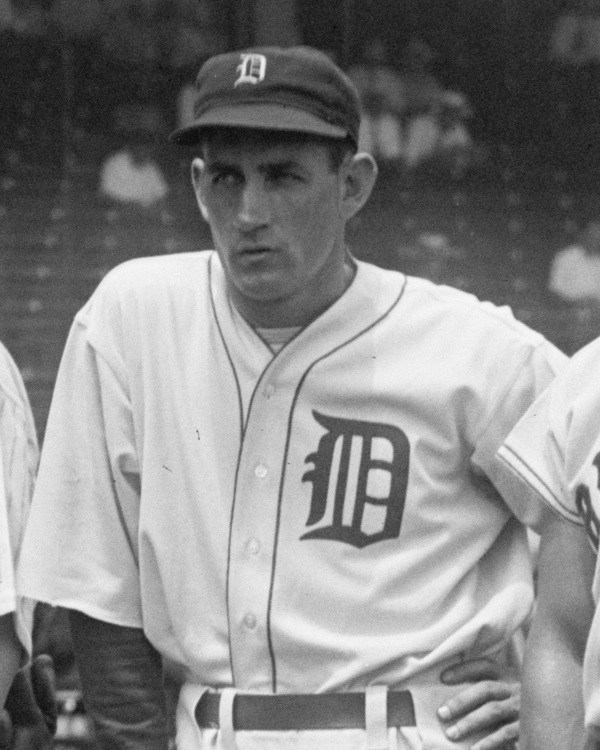
1949 BBWAA inductee Charlie Gehringer

Elections to the Baseball Hall of Fame for 1949 followed the rules in place since 1947, which had governed two successful elections of recent players. The Baseball Writers' Association of America (BBWAA) voted by mail to select from players retired less than 25 years, with provision for a runoff in case of no winner. This year the runoff was necessary to elect one person, Charlie Gehringer. Meanwhile, the Old-Timers Committee, which met on no schedule and not since 1946, responded again to the continuing calls for election of more of the game's earlier stars. It selected Mordecai Brown and Kid Nichols.

An induction ceremony was held in Cooperstown, New York, on June 13, 1949, for inductees of both 1948 and 1949. Of the five total inductees, Kid Nichols and Pie Traynor attended, while Charlie Gehringer was unable to attend. Mordecai Brown and Herb Pennock had both died in 1948. Dignitaries present included National League president Ford Frick, Hall of Fame founder Stephen Carlton Clark, Hall of Fame president Bob Quinn, and Brooklyn Dodgers president Branch Rickey.

== BBWAA election ==
=== Initial ballot ===
The 10-year members of the BBWAA had the authority to select any players active in 1924 or later, provided they had not been active in 1948. Voters were instructed to cast votes for 10 candidates; any candidate receiving votes on at least 75% of the ballots would be honored with induction to the Hall. If no candidate received votes on 75% of the ballots, the top 20 candidates would advance to a runoff election.

A total of 153 ballots were cast, with 1,409 individual votes for 98 specific candidates, an average of 9.21 per ballot; 115 votes were required for election. The results were announced in February 1949. For the first time in three elections following the most recent format change, no candidate received 75% of the vote, and a runoff was necessary.

As had been true the previous year, a large number of players received votes, though few players were named who had not appeared in the 1948 vote apart from the newly eligible 1947 retirees (prominently, Mel Ott and Hank Greenberg); every still-eligible player who received more than 2 votes in 1948 was again named. 66 of those named received votes on less than 5% of the ballots, with 28 receiving only a single vote; every candidate had been eligible at some point in the past – for some, the 1936 election in which active players were eligible.

Greenberg's eligibility was questioned by some voters, as he had been listed on the Cleveland Indians' active roster for part of the 1948 season as a precautionary move against injuries to other players. However, he was removed from the active roster once it became clear that his position as an Indians executive precluded any playing role, and he did not appear in any games; nonetheless, some voters maintained that his inclusion on the roster made him an active player and thus ineligible for election in 1949.

Once again, the focus was now on the most recent players; those who had retired before 1932 receded even further in the voting. Only 2 of the top 22 candidates, and none of the top 15, had retired before 1932; 12 of the 20 players reaching the runoff had been active in 1941 or later. Of the 98 players named, only 24 retired before 1930; they received only 9% of the vote. Three players who had retired before 1924 (none earlier than 1921) and were officially ineligible nevertheless received a single vote each; this was a notable reduction from the previous year's total of 23 votes for such now-ineligible candidates. Votes for those best known as managers again appeared, though only for those who were eligible as players and not to the same extent as in 1948, perhaps due to an expectation of more selections from the Old-Timers Committee.

Chief Bender, who was technically eligible due to a single inning pitched in 1925, received only 2 votes – a continued drop from his past prominence on the ballot; as with the previous election, it seems either that most voters were unaware of his eligibility or that they viewed it as irrelevant to the spirit of the rules. There was also some confusion as to the cutoff year for eligibility; some writers believed it to be 1927 or 1928 rather than 1924. Dizzy Dean, whose eligibility in 1948 had been questioned due to a single appearance in a 1947 game, returned to the same level he had attained in the 1947 election. Unlike the 1948 election, no players active in the previous year received votes.

The top 20 candidates, who had each received 20 or more votes, advanced to the runoff election; candidates who have since been selected in subsequent elections are indicated in italics:

Player	Votes	Percent	Change
Charlie Gehringer	102	66.7	▲23.7%
Mel Ott	94	61.4	-
Al Simmons	89	58.2	▲8.6%
Dizzy Dean	88	57.5	▲24.4%
Jimmie Foxx	85	55.6	▲14.3%
Bill Terry	81	52.9	▲9.9%
Paul Waner	73	47.7	▲5.6%
Hank Greenberg	67	43.8	-
Bill Dickey	65	42.5	▲10.3%
Harry Heilmann	59	38.6	▲5.5%
Rabbit Maranville	58	37.9	▲6.5%
Gabby Hartnett	35	22.9	▼4.4%
Joe Cronin	33	21.6	▲0.9%
Dazzy Vance	33	21.6	▲2.6%
Ted Lyons	29	19.0	▲6.6%
Ray Schalk	24	15.7	▼2.5%
Hack Wilson	24	15.7	▲14.0%
Red Ruffing	22	14.4	▲11.1%
Tony Lazzeri	20	13.1	▼4.3%
Ross Youngs	20	13.1	▼2.6%
Lefty Gomez	17	11.1	▼2.1%
Pepper Martin	16	10.5	▲4.7%
Zack Wheat	15	9.8	▼2.6%
Edd Roush	14	9.2	▼4.8%
Max Carey	12	7.8	▲0.4%
Bucky Harris	11	7.2	▲4.7%
Hank Gowdy	10	6.5	▲4.0%
Charlie Grimm	10	6.5	▲1.5%
Chuck Klein	9	5.9	▲3.4%
Jim Bottomley	8	5.2	▲1.9%
Burleigh Grimes	8	5.2	-
Stuffy McInnis	8	5.2	▲1.1%
Jimmy Dykes	7	4.6	▲0.5%
Waite Hoyt	7	4.6	▼1.2%
Billy Southworth	7	4.6	-
Earle Combs	6	3.9	▼1.1%
Red Faber	6	3.9	▲1.4%
Travis Jackson	6	3.9	▼0.2%
Steve O'Neill	6	3.9	▲2.2%
Jimmie Wilson	6	3.9	▼2.7%
Babe Adams	5	3.3	Steady
Dave Bancroft	5	3.3	Steady
Babe Herman	5	3.3	▲1.6%
Wilbur Cooper	4	2.6	▲0.9%
Kiki Cuyler	4	2.6	▲0.1%
Goose Goslin	4	2.6	▲1.8%
Stan Hack	4	2.6	▲0.9%
Mel Harder	4	2.6	-
Rube Marquard	4	2.6	▼2.4%
Lefty O'Doul	4	2.6	▼0.7%
Eppa Rixey	4	2.6	▼1.5%
Stan Coveleski	3	2.0	▲0.3%
Bob Meusel	3	2.0	▼3.0%
Sam Rice	3	2.0	▲1.2%
Everett Scott	3	2.0	▼0.5%
Casey Stengel	3	2.0	▲1.2%
Lloyd Waner	3	2.0	-
Chief Bender	2	1.3	▼2.8%
Joe Dugan	2	1.3	▼1.2%
George Earnshaw	2	1.3	▼1.2%
Freddie Fitzsimmons	2	1.3	▼0.4%
Charlie Gelbert	2	1.3	-
Chick Hafey	2	1.3	▲0.5%
Jesse Haines	2	1.3	▼0.4%
Billy Jurges	2	1.3	-
Red Lucas	2	1.3	-
Eddie Rommel	2	1.3	▼1.2%
Urban Shocker	2	1.3	▲0.5%
Lon Warneke	2	1.3	-
Cy Williams	2	1.3	▲0.5%
Earl Averill	1	0.7	-
Ossie Bluege	1	0.7	▼1.0%
Ping Bodie	1	0.7	-
George Burns	1	0.7	-
Ben Chapman	1	0.7	-
Spud Davis	1	0.7	▼0.1%
Leo Durocher	1	0.7	▼0.1%
Howard Ehmke	1	0.7	-
Wes Ferrell	1	0.7	▼0.1%
Art Fletcher	1	0.7	▼1.8%
Joe Judge	1	0.7	-
George Kelly	1	0.7	▼1.0%
Dickey Kerr	1	0.7	-
Freddie Lindstrom	1	0.7	-
Al López	1	0.7	-
Heinie Manush	1	0.7	▼0.1%
Buddy Myer	1	0.7	-
Art Nehf	1	0.7	-
Roger Peckinpaugh	1	0.7	-
Hub Pruett	1	0.7	-
Jimmy Ring	1	0.7	-
Charlie Root	1	0.7	▼1.8%
George Selkirk	1	0.7	-
Bill Sherdel	1	0.7	▼0.1%
Fred Toney	1	0.7	-
Billy Werber	1	0.7	-
Whitey Witt	1	0.7	-
Glenn Wright	1	0.7	▼1.0%

Players who were elected in future elections. These individuals are also indicated in plain italics.

=== Runoff election ===
From the 20 final candidates listed on the ballot, voters were instructed to cast votes for five; they were aware of the totals from the first election. Any candidates receiving votes on at least 75% of the ballots would be elected and honored with induction to the Hall. A total of 187 ballots were cast, with 920 individual votes for the 20 candidates, an average of 4.92 per ballot; 141 votes were required for election. The results were announced on May 5; exactly one player reached the threshold of 75% and was therefore elected.

The more recent players once again figured more prominently in the voting, with the top 6 candidates retired less than 7 years. There was much criticism from those who disliked the runoff process, believing it amounted to two virtually identical elections in a row; with the candidates finishing in roughly the same order both times, many voters felt they were essentially being encouraged to vote for the top candidates from the first ballot in order to ensure at least one selection (in fact, vote totals decreased for every candidate save Gehringer and Ott, the top two vote-getters in the initial round). As a result, the rules were again revised by the Hall of Fame Committee, and the runoff procedure was eliminated after 1949; it would not be reinstated until after the 1960 election.

The induction ceremonies were held in Cooperstown on June 13, with Brooklyn Dodgers president Branch Rickey officiating. The two 1948 selectees being formally inducted as well; Pie Traynor was present. Charlie Gehringer, however, was unable to attend, as he was in California preparing for his wedding on June 18.

The sole candidate who received at least 75% of the vote and was elected is indicated in bold italics; all the remaining candidates have since been selected in subsequent elections, with 16 of the 20 chosen by 1956, and the last (Tony Lazzeri) in 1991:

Player	Votes	Percent	Change
**Charlie Gehringer**	159	85.0	▲18.3%
Mel Ott	128	68.4	▲7.0%
Jimmie Foxx	89	47.6	▼8.0%
Dizzy Dean	81	43.3	▼14.2%
Al Simmons	76	40.6	▼17.6%
Paul Waner	63	33.7	▼14.0%
Harry Heilmann	52	27.8	▼10.8%
Bill Terry	48	25.7	▼27.2%
Hank Greenberg	44	23.5	▼20.3%
Bill Dickey	39	20.9	▼21.6%
Rabbit Maranville	39	20.9	▼17.0%
Ray Schalk	17	9.1	▼6.6%
Joe Cronin	16	8.6	▼13.0%
Dazzy Vance	15	8.0	▼13.6%
Ted Lyons	14	7.5	▼11.5%
Hack Wilson	12	6.4	▼9.3%
Ross Youngs	11	5.9	▼7.2%
Gabby Hartnett	7	3.7	▼19.2%
Tony Lazzeri	6	3.2	▼9.9%
Red Ruffing	4	2.1	▼12.3%

== Old-Timers Committee ==
After not having voted on new inductees since 1946, the committee still did not meet formally to consider candidates; instead, the members cast ballots by mail on candidates from the pre-1924 era. This minor action temporarily decreased criticism that earlier players were being overlooked, but it would be the only attempt between 1946 and 1953 to elect players from this period, and there was no attempt to review managers and other non-playing candidates.

On May 9, it was announced that two pitchers had been selected:

- Mordecai "Three Finger" Brown, whose career extended from 1903 to 1916, ending with 239 victories and a 2.06 ERA; he had been the main pitching star on the Chicago Cubs teams which dominated the National League between 1906 and 1910, with Brown winning 20 or more games each season as the club won four pennants. His shutout in Game 5 of the 1907 World Series clinched the championship for the Cubs. In 25 career matchups against Christy Mathewson, Brown won 13 times, with Mathewson winning 11. His partial loss of two fingers in a childhood farm accident had led to his pitches having an atypical motion.
- Charles "Kid" Nichols, who won 360 games between 1890 and 1906, primarily with the 5-time champion Boston Beaneaters; at age 30, he became the youngest man ever to win 300 games, and he retired with the 3rd-most wins of any pitcher. He won over 20 games every year in the 1890s, and won 30 or more a record 7 times. An incredibly strong-armed pitcher despite his small size (5'9", 170 pounds (77 kg)), he regularly pitched over 400 innings per year, and completed all but 30 of his 561 career starts – never being replaced by a relief pitcher.

Nichols was still living, but Brown had died the previous year. They were formally inducted on June 13 along with Charlie Gehringer and the 1948 selections, Pie Traynor and the late Herb Pennock; Nichols and Traynor were in attendance.

The selection of these two pitchers from the period between 1890 and 1916 was roundly applauded, but it was noted that stars of the earlier era had been ignored once again, as well as position players from the same period.
