= Kid Nichols =

American baseball player (1869–1953)

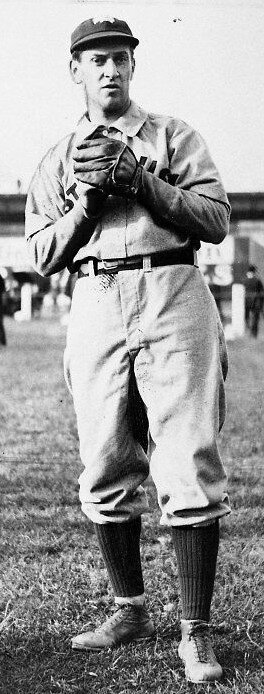
- Nichols in 1904
- Pitcher
- Born: September 14, 1869; Madison, Wisconsin, U.S.
- Died: April 11, 1953 (aged 83); Kansas City, Missouri, U.S.
- Batted: Switch Threw: Right

MLB debut
- April 23, 1890, for the Boston Beaneaters

Last MLB appearance
- May 18, 1906, for the Philadelphia Phillies

MLB statistics
- Win–loss record: 362–208
- Earned run average: 2.96
- Strikeouts: 1,881
- Managerial record: 80–88
- Winning %: .476
- Stats at Baseball Reference

Teams
- As player: Boston Beaneaters (1890–1901); St. Louis Cardinals (1904–1905); Philadelphia Phillies (1905–1906); As manager: St. Louis Cardinals (1904–1905)

Career highlights and awards
- 3× NL wins leader (1896–1898); Braves Hall of Fame

Member of the National

Baseball Hall of Fame
- Induction: 1949
- Election method: Old-Timers Committee

Charles Augustus "Kid" Nichols (September 14, 1869 – April 11, 1953) was an American Major League Baseball (MLB) pitcher who played for the Boston Beaneaters, St. Louis Cardinals and Philadelphia Phillies from 1890 to 1906. A switch hitter who threw right-handed, he was listed at 5 feet 10 inches (1.78 m) and 175 pounds (79 kg). He is a member of the Baseball Hall of Fame.

Nichols played minor league baseball for three teams until 1889, when he signed with the Boston Beaneaters. After making his debut the following season and spending 12 seasons with the Beaneaters, Nichols spent a two-year sojourn in the minor leagues. He was dealt to the St. Louis Cardinals in 1904 and subsequently played for the Philadelphia Phillies, with whom he finished his career in 1906. He is famous for being the youngest pitcher to join the 300 win club.

== Early life ==
Nichols was born on September 14, 1869, in Madison, Wisconsin. His parents were Robert and Christina Nichols. His father had worked as a butcher and owned a grocery store with several locations in Madison. Robert had at least four children from a prior marriage to a woman named Sarah, who died of tuberculosis in 1859. Robert and Christina had several children together.

The family moved from Madison to Kansas City, Missouri when Nichols was a child. While his siblings worked in the family butcher shop, Nichols pursued baseball.

== Baseball career ==
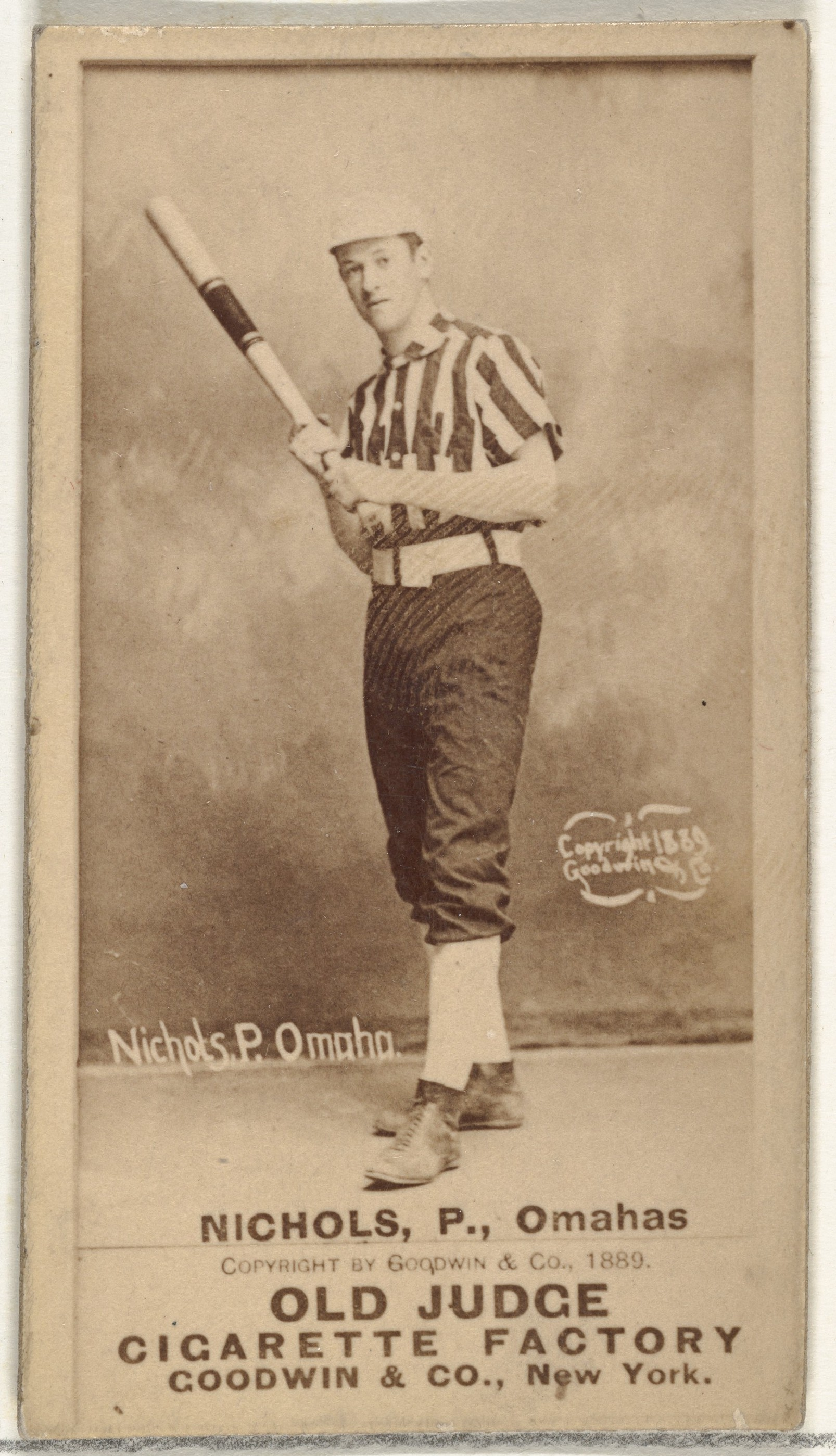
Kid Nichols, 1889

Before he turned 18 years old, Nichols had debuted in the minor leagues with the 1887 Kansas City Cowboys of the Western League, earning an 18–12 win–loss record that season. He spent 1888 between the Kansas City Blues of the Western Association and Memphis of the Southern League, finishing the year with a combined 27–10 record. In 1889, he registered a 39–8 record for the Omaha Omahogs of the Western Association.

Nichols signed with the Boston Beaneaters in September 1889 and entered the major leagues in with them in 1890. Due to Nichols's youthful appearance and relative lack of physical heft, Beaneaters' players and fans began calling him "Kid," a nickname which stuck for the rest of his career. Nichols recorded a 27–19 win–loss record, a 2.23 earned run average (ERA) and 222 strikeouts, beginning a string of 10 consecutive seasons with 20 wins or more. Nichols also had a major league record seven 30-win seasons in this time (1891–1894, 1896–1898) with a career high of 35 in 1892. The Beaneaters won several pennant races during Nichols' tenure, finishing in first place five times between 1891 and 1898. The team had 102 wins per season in 1892 and 1898, which stood as franchise highs until 1998. Baseball-Reference.com calculates that Nichols led the team in wins above replacement in 1890 and 1892 through 1898.

Nichols had his first losing season in 1900, when he went 13–16. He improved to 19–16 the following year. After the 1901 season, Nichols purchased an interest in a minor league franchise in Kansas City, the Kansas City Blue Stockings. He left the Beaneaters to manage and pitch for the Kansas City Blue Stockings, where he won a total of 48 games in 1902 and 1903. After a two-year hiatus from the major leagues, Nichols returned to the 20-win plateau for the 11th and final time in his career in 1904 for a new team, the St. Louis Cardinals. The Philadelphia Phillies picked him up off waivers in 1905, and he finished his career with them in 1906, playing his final game on May 18, 1906.

Nichols retired with 362 wins, 208 losses, 1,881 strikeouts and a 2.96 ERA. Nichols's win total was exceeded at the time only by Cy Young and Pud Galvin and is now the seventh highest total in major league history. His 5,067 1/3 innings pitched ranks 11th all-time. He was the youngest pitcher to win 300 games, reaching that milestone at the age of 30.

== Later life ==
After baseball, Nichols dabbled in the motion picture industry, partnering with Joe Tinker in a business that distributed movies to theatres in the midwest. An accomplished bowler, Nichols also opened bowling alleys in the Kansas City area. He won Kansas City's Class A bowling championship at age 64.

Nichols was inducted into the National Baseball Hall of Fame in 1949. He was said to have been proud of two things: his Hall of Fame selection and the fact that he had never been replaced in a game by a relief pitcher.

In October 1952, the 83-year-old Nichols was admitted to Menorah Hospital in Kansas City to investigate a complaint with his neck. Doctors ordered tests, but Nichols would not submit to them until after the seventh game of the World Series ended. He was later diagnosed with carcinomatosis, cancer that had spread throughout his body. He died on April 11, 1953.

== Quotes ==
Nichols took pride in throwing complete games, stating, "I take pride in two things. My election to baseball's Hall of Fame and the fact I never was removed from a game for a relief hurler."

== See also ==
- List of Major League Baseball career wins leaders
- List of Major League Baseball career shutout leaders
- List of Major League Baseball career hit batsmen leaders
- List of Major League Baseball annual wins leaders
- List of Major League Baseball annual shutout leaders
- List of Major League Baseball annual saves leaders
- List of Major League Baseball player-managers

Achievements
Preceded by Tony Mullane	All-Time Saves Leader; 1899–1906 (shared with Mullanane 1899–1903)	Succeeded by Joe McGinnity
