= Bill DeLancey =

American baseball player (1911–1946)

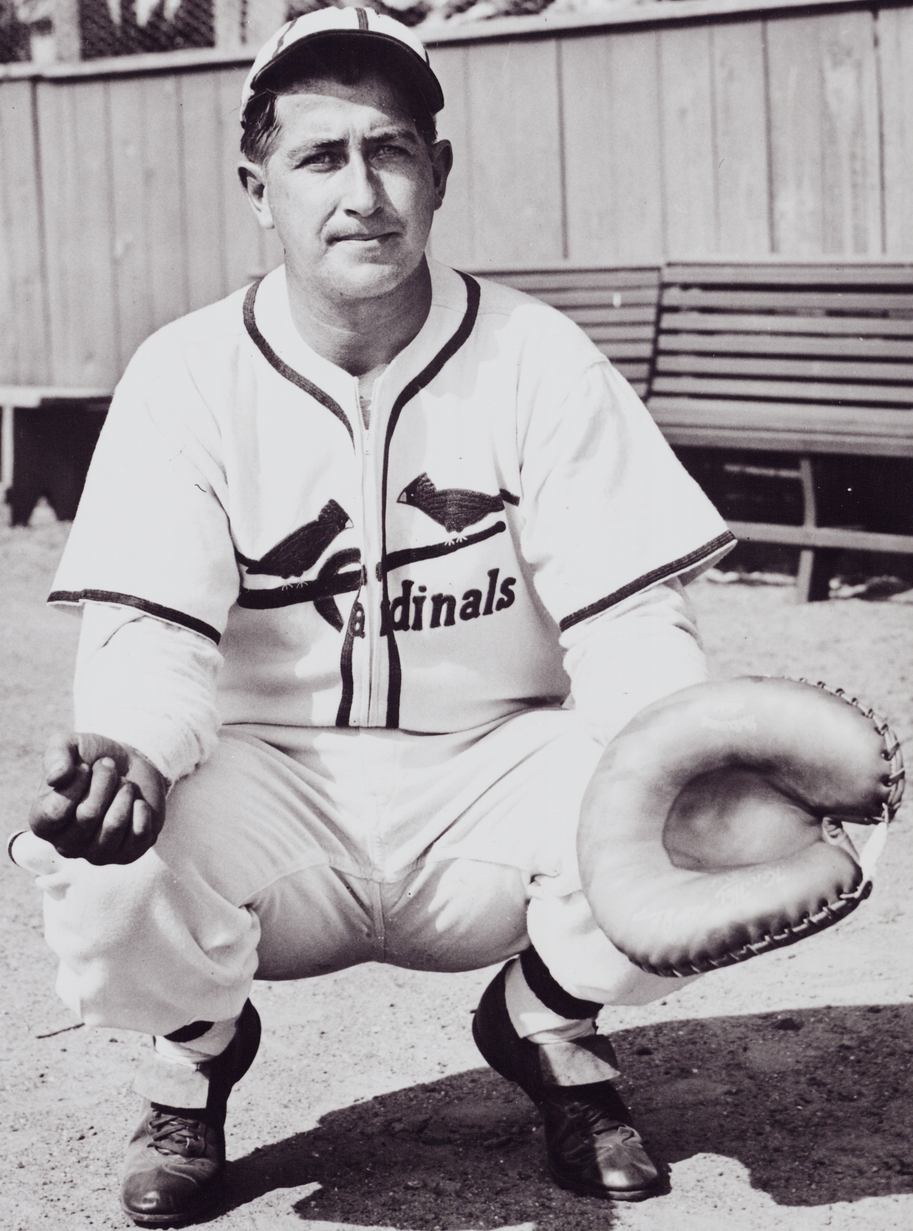
- Catcher
- Born: November 28, 1911; Greensboro, North Carolina, U.S.
- Died: November 28, 1946 (aged 35); Phoenix, Arizona, U.S.
- Batted: Left Threw: Right

MLB debut
- September 11, 1932, for the St. Louis Cardinals

Last MLB appearance
- September 8, 1940, for the St. Louis Cardinals

MLB statistics
- Batting average: .289
- Home runs: 19
- Runs batted in: 85
- Stats at Baseball Reference

Teams
- St. Louis Cardinals (1932, 1934–1935, 1940)

William Pinkney DeLancey (November 28, 1911 – November 28, 1946) was an American professional baseball player during the 1930s. As a 22-year-old rookie catcher in 1934, he helped to lead the St. Louis Cardinals' fabled Gashouse Gang team to the world championship; but, after only one more full big-league season, he was stricken with tuberculosis, effectively ending his playing career.

== Minor League career ==
The 5 ft 11 in (1.80 m), 185 lb (84 kg) DeLancey was born in Greensboro, North Carolina. He signed with the Cardinals' farm system in 1930. He spent his first year in the minors playing for the Shawnee (Oklahoma) Robins in the Class C Western Association, making an impressive showing with a .297 batting average on 192 at-bats. In 1931, he was reassigned to the Danville (Illinois) Veterans of the Class B Illinois–Indiana–Iowa League, where he continued to show improvement, ending the year by playing 11 games with the Columbus (Ohio) Red Birds of the American Association. The following year, DeLancey was transferred to the Class C Springfield (Missouri) Cardinals, batting .329 with 118 RBIs, and received his Major League baptism by appearing in eight games for the major league Cardinals in September 1932. In 1933, he returned to the Columbus Red Birds, hitting 21 home runs and batting .285 in 123 games.

== Major League career ==
In 1934, he made the Cardinals' roster and, as a left-handed hitter, platooned with the right-handed Spud Davis to share the Cardinals' regular catching job. He became a favorite of player-manager Frankie Frisch, and performed admirably on the field, hitting .316 with 80 hits, 18 doubles, 13 home runs, 41 bases on balls and an OPS of .979 in 295 plate appearances. The catching platoon—Davis started 89 games, and DeLancey 65—was highly effective, as the veteran Davis, 29, hit an even .300 with 65 runs batted in and an .830 OPS. The Cardinals outlasted the New York Giants in a September pennant race to take the National League championship on September 29. DeLancey was behind the plate during the clincher, catching fellow rookie Paul Dean's complete game.

The Cardinals' opponents in the 1934 World Series, the American League champion Detroit Tigers, featured an all-right-handed starting rotation, and manager Frisch responded by starting DeLancey as his catcher in every contest. DeLancey caught every inning (Davis was a perfect two-for-two as a pinch hitter), as St. Louis prevailed in seven games. DeLancey collected only five hits in 29 at bats, but four of them were for extra bases, including three doubles and a home run, hit off Tommy Bridges in Game 5 at Sportsman's Park. DeLancey also drove in four runs.

The DeLancey-Davis catching platoon returned in 1935, but DeLancey got off to a sluggish start at the plate. He recovered in midyear and lifted his batting average to .321 on July 21, before fading to .279 during the heat of August and September. He also began to experience loss of energy and appetite. Still, he started half of the Cardinals' 154 regular-season games. During an off-season sandlot game, however, he collapsed and was diagnosed with tuberculosis. Realizing the seriousness of his condition while recuperating in Arizona, he voluntarily retired from the Cardinals on February 12, 1936.

== Managing career ==
In 1937, the Cardinals established a Class D farm team in Albuquerque, New Mexico, and hired the weakened DeLancey as its manager. He was able to lead the Albuquerque Cardinals for three years, 1937–1939, and win two Arizona–Texas League championships. He also regained enough strength to return to the field for brief periods as a player, for nine games in 1938 and for 19 games in 1939.

== Return to the Cardinals ==
In 1940, his health had improved to the point that he was able to return to the Cardinals, and he spent the year as the Redbirds' third-string catcher. He appeared in 15 games, 12 in the field (with two starts), and collected four hits in 18 at-bats. His final major league appearance was against the Pittsburgh Pirates on September 8, 1940. Over his short but illustrious career, Bill DeLancey played in 219 MLB games, amassing 173 hits, with 32 doubles, ten triples, 19 home runs, 85 runs batted in and a .289 batting average.

== Return to managing ==
DeLancey resumed his managerial career in the Cardinals' farm system in 1941 with the Class C Pioneer League—concluding his active career with 49 games played—and 1942 in the Class B Piedmont League. When World War II intervened, many minor leagues suspended operations or folded entirely, and DeLancey's managerial career ended in 1942.

== Major League legacy ==
Baseball Hall of Fame executive Branch Rickey, who was the general manager of the Gashouse Gang Cardinals, named DeLancey as the catcher on his all-time team, despite DeLancey's illness-shortened career. In 1963, the elderly Rickey also likened the Cardinals' young catcher, Tim McCarver—a skilled, left-handed hitter and take-charge presence behind the plate—to DeLancey.

== Personal life ==
While playing for the Danville Veterans during the 1931 season, Bill met Frances Yasaitis, a nursing student from nearby Westville, Illinois. Although he was on the road for away games that year and was transferred to the Springfield Cardinals the following year, they grew increasingly close. Following the end of the 1932 season, the couple were married in Danville. About a month before the start of the 1934 World Series, Frances gave birth to a daughter, Doris. After Bill contracted tuberculosis and retired from play, doctors advised the couple to move to the dry desert climate of the southwest U.S., so the DeLanceys took up residence in Phoenix. Frances' nursing experience helped Bill's condition improve somewhat over the next several years, however, his tuberculosis gradually developed into pleurisy, a painful lung disease. Nevertheless, the DeLanceys were able to have another child, Mary Jane, in 1945. His health then began to decline again, and he died on his 35th birthday, November 28, 1946, in Phoenix. He is interred at St. Francis Catholic Cemetery there.
