= Stan Hack =

American baseball player and manager (1909–1979)

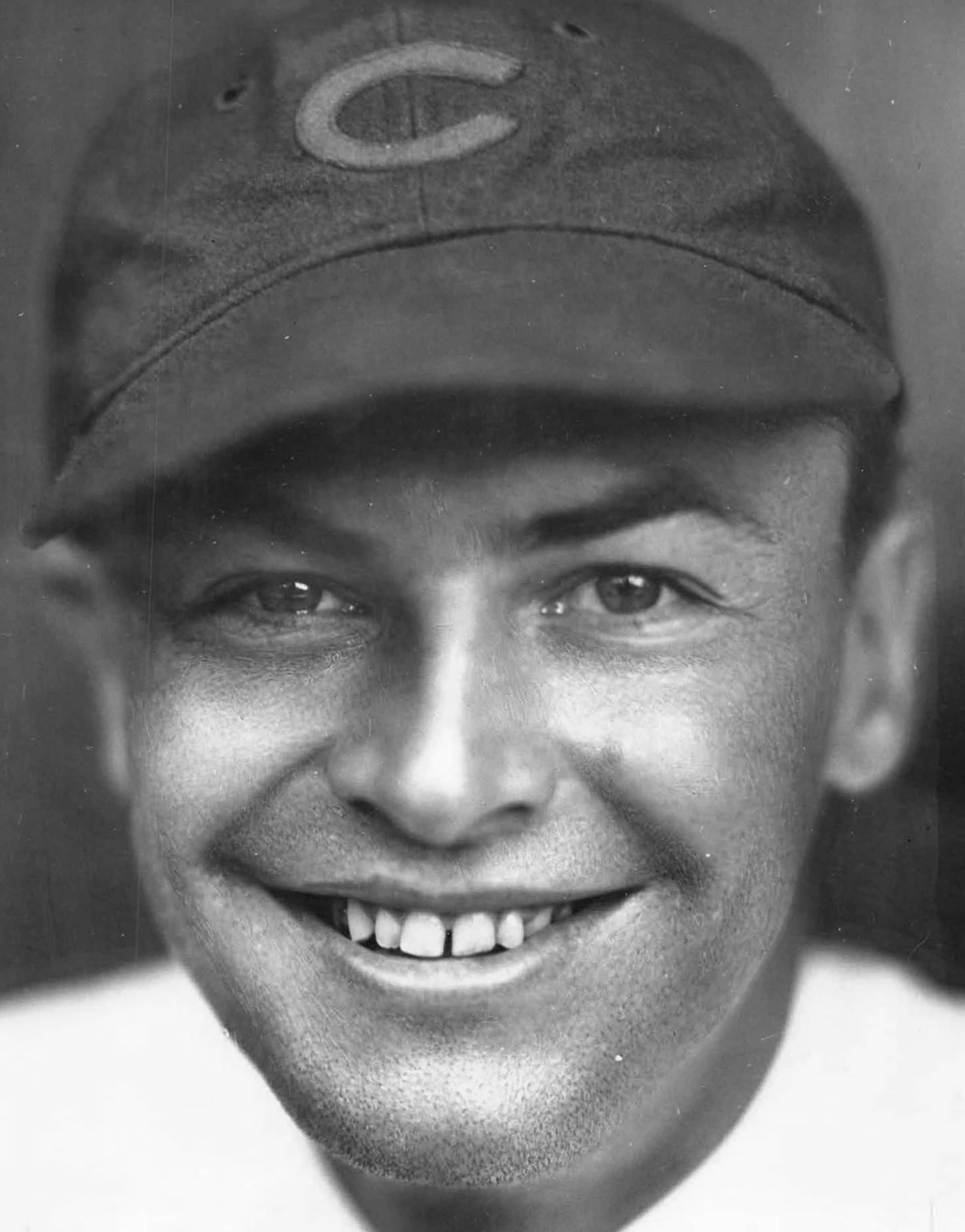
- Hack in 1938
- Third baseman / Manager
- Born: December 6, 1909; Sacramento, California, U.S.
- Died: December 15, 1979 (aged 70); Dixon, Illinois, U.S.
- Batted: Left Threw: Right

MLB debut
- April 12, 1932, for the Chicago Cubs

Last MLB appearance
- September 24, 1947, for the Chicago Cubs

MLB statistics
- Batting average: .301
- Hits: 2,193
- Home runs: 57
- Runs batted in: 642
- Managerial record: 199–272
- Winning %: .423
- Stats at Baseball Reference

Teams
- As player: Chicago Cubs (1932–1947); As manager: Chicago Cubs (1954–1956); St. Louis Cardinals (1958)

Career highlights and awards
- 5× All-Star (1938, 1939, 1941, 1943, 1945); 2× NL stolen base leader (1938, 1939); Chicago Cubs Hall of Fame

Stanley Camfield Hack (December 6, 1909 – December 15, 1979), nicknamed "Smiling Stan", was an American third baseman and manager in Major League Baseball who played his entire career for the Chicago Cubs and was the National League's top third baseman in the late 1930s and early 1940s. Usually a leadoff hitter, he batted .301 lifetime, scored 100 runs seven times and led the NL in hits and stolen bases twice each. His 1092 walks ranked fourth in NL history when he retired, and remain a franchise record; he also hit .348 in the World Series, which he competed in four times. His .394 career on-base percentage was the highest by a 20th-century third baseman until Wade Boggs exceeded it in the late 1980s, and was the top NL mark until 2001. Hack led the NL in putouts five times, in double plays three times and in assists and fielding percentage twice each. At the end of his career he ranked second in major league history to Pie Traynor in games (1836) at third base, second in NL history to Traynor in putouts (1944), assists (3494) and total chances (5684), and third in NL history in double plays (255).

== Early life ==
Hack, who batted left-handed and threw right-handed, was born in Sacramento, California, and played baseball at Sacramento High School. After high school he worked at a bank and played semi-pro baseball on weekends. He tried out for the Sacramento Solons in 1931, and was signed by Cubs president William Veeck, Sr. for $40,000 after hitting .352 in his first minor league season that year. He broke in with the Cubs in 1932, and backed up Woody English in his first two years – also hitting .299 in the International League in 1933 – before becoming the full-time third baseman in 1934.

He was later inducted into the hometown Sacramento Sports Hall of Fame.

== Pro career ==
In the 1932 World Series against the New York Yankees, his sole appearance was as a pinch runner for Gabby Hartnett in the eighth inning of the final 13–6 Game 4 loss. In his first full year in 1934, he batted a respectable .289 and tied for fifth in the league with 11 steals. In 1935 he began to assume Traynor's mantle as the league's top third baseman, batting .311 and finishing third in the NL in on-base percentage and tied for fourth in steals.

He quickly became one of the sport's most popular players, and 21-year-old team employee Bill Veeck (William's son) staged a 1935 promotion in which fans were given mirrors labeled "Smile with Stan", with Hack's face on the reverse side; but the fans used the mirrors to reflect sunlight into the eyes of opposing batters, and the umpires threatened to forfeit the game if they didn't stop. The NL office quickly banned any similar promotions in the future. Batting an unusually low seventh in the 1935 World Series against the Detroit Tigers, he hit only .227 as the Cubs lost in six games. In Game 3 he singled, stole second base and scored to give Chicago a 2–0 lead in the second inning, and singled and scored again in the ninth as the Cubs tied the game at 5, though they lost 6–5 in 11 innings. In Game 6 at Navin Field, he doubled with two out in the sixth inning, and tripled to lead off the ninth with the score tied at 3, but the Cubs were unable to drive him in. Manager Charlie Grimm opted to let starting pitcher Larry French bat with one out, and French hit a ground ball to the pitcher, Tommy Bridges, with Augie Galan flying to left to end the inning; the Tigers won the Series in the bottom of the inning when Mickey Cochrane scored on Goose Goslin's single.

In 1936 Hack batted .298, and tied for second in the NL with 17 steals – the first of five straight years in which he finished first or second. He also scored 100 runs for the first time, and had a career-high 78 runs batted in. He led the league in putouts (151), assists (247) and double plays (25) in 1937, and was second in runs (106) and steals (16) and third in walks (83) while hitting .297. 1938 marked his best season to date as he hit .320 (sixth in the league), led the NL in steals (16), was second in hits (195) and runs (109), fourth in walks (94) and fifth in on-base percentage (.411). He had 67 RBI as the team featured a remarkably well balanced offense, with seven of the eight regulars having between 56 and 67 RBI. He was among the league's top ten players in doubles, triples (a career-best 11) and total bases, led the NL in putouts (178) and double plays (26), and made his first of five All-Star teams as the Cubs won the pennant by two games; Hack finished seventh in the MVP voting. In the World Series against the Yankees, he was one of the Cubs' scarce heroes, batting .471 although they were swept in four games. In Game 1, he had three singles and drove in Chicago's only run in a 3–1 loss. He singled and scored in the first inning of Game 2, and did so again to tie the score at 2 in the third inning, though they went on to lose 6–3. He doubled and scored in the fifth inning of Game 3 for a 1–0 lead, but they lost 5–2; he had two more hits in the 8–3 Game 4 loss.

In 1939 he batted .298 and tied for the NL lead in steals with 17, also finishing second in runs (112) and pacing the league in putouts (177). He had another outstanding campaign in 1940, topping the league in putouts (175), assists (302) and double plays (27), finishing fourth with a .317 batting average, and tying for the NL lead in hits (191). He was one behind the league leader with 21 steals, and was fourth in doubles (38, a personal best), fifth in runs (101), and sixth in on-base percentage (.395) and total bases (265). Although he did not make the All-Star team, he finished eighth in the MVP balloting. On May 17 of that year, he suffered a concussion after being hit in the head by a foul ball while standing on third base as a baserunner. In 1941 he duplicated the previous year's accomplishments by again finishing fourth in the NL with a .317 batting mark and leading the league in hits; he was second in the league with a .417 on-base percentage and 111 runs, fourth in walks and fifth in doubles. And in 1942 he was third in hits and doubles, fourth in runs and walks, and fifth in on-base percentage, while again batting .300 and leading the NL in fielding average for the first time with a .965 mark. In an 18-inning game against Cincinnati on August 9 of that year he reached base nine times to tie the regular season record that had been previously set by Max Carey (1922) and Johnny Burnett (1932); no player has matched Hack in the regular season since that day (in Game 3 of the 2025 World Series, Shohei Ohtani became the first postseason player with nine times on base).

1943 saw a slight drop-off in his performance, though he was still among the league leaders in walks and on-base percentage, with a .289 batting average, and was again an All-Star; but a strained relationship with manager Jimmie Wilson led Hack to retire at season's end. He was persuaded to return in mid-1944 after Grimm returned to lead the team, and batted .282 in 98 games – his lowest mark in over ten years – with similarly lowered averages in slugging and OBP. But 1945 marked a full comeback as he enjoyed one of his best years, leading the NL again in putouts (195) and fielding average (.975), and setting a record with 54 consecutive error-less games. He hit a career-high .323 (fourth in the league), and finished third in OBP (.420), hits (193) and walks (99) and fifth in runs (110). The Cubs won the pennant by three games, and Hack finished eleventh in the MVP vote, won by teammate Phil Cavarretta. In the World Series against the Tigers, he hit .367, though memories of Game 6 of the 1935 Series lingered. In Game 1 at Detroit, he was observed staring out toward third base; when asked what he was looking at, he replied, "I was just looking to see if I was still standing there." He reached base four times in a 4–1 loss in Game 2, and had two hits in the 3–0 Game 3 win. Game 6 at Wrigley Field was a thrilling affair; after a walk and a single in his first two turns at the plate, he singled with the bases loaded in the fifth inning to give the Cubs a 2–1 lead, and went on to score himself. After another walk and single, he came to bat in the 12th inning with the score tied at 7, two out and pinch runner Bill Schuster on first base; Hack doubled to left field off Tiger pitcher Dizzy Trout, with the ball taking a sharp bounce over outfielder Hank Greenberg's shoulder, giving the Cubs an 8–7 win and tying the Series. It was the first time in the Cubs' history that any player had recorded four hits in a World Series game; a feat which was matched 71 years later by Kris Bryant in Game 6 of the 2016 Series. It was all for naught, however, as Chicago lost 9–3 in Game 7. They would not return to the Fall Classic until 2016.

In 1946, he hit .285 in only 92 games, though he was still fifth in the league with 83 walks. He ended his career in 1947 with a .271 average in 76 games. In a 16-season career, Hack had 57 home runs and 642 RBI; his totals of 1,938 games, 7,278 at-bats and 2,193 hits ranked second in Cubs history to 19th-century first baseman Cap Anson, and his totals in hits, doubles (363) and total bases (2,889) placed him behind only Traynor among NL third basemen. His 1,239 runs were the third most by a third baseman, behind only Arlie Latham (1,478) and Lave Cross (1,333); his 165 stolen bases were the fourth most by any National Leaguer between 1920 and 1950, trailing only Frankie Frisch, Max Carey and Kiki Cuyler. He was only 27 games behind Traynor's league record for games at third base, and was behind only Traynor and Heinie Groh in career double plays in the NL. In the timespan of his career, he ranked 5th in hits. His total of 1,092 walks – then the most by any third baseman – placed him behind only Mel Ott (1,708), Jimmy Sheckard (1,134) and Billy Hamilton (1,096) in NL history. At the end of the 20th century, his .394 on-base percentage still ranked first for primary third basemen with at least 1,000 games played in National League history (he was subsequently passed by Chipper Jones) and it still ranks 5th for all primary third basemen in MLB history. Baseball historian Bill James ranked Hack as the ninth best player at the position of third base ahead of a few members of the Baseball Hall of Fame.

== Managing ==
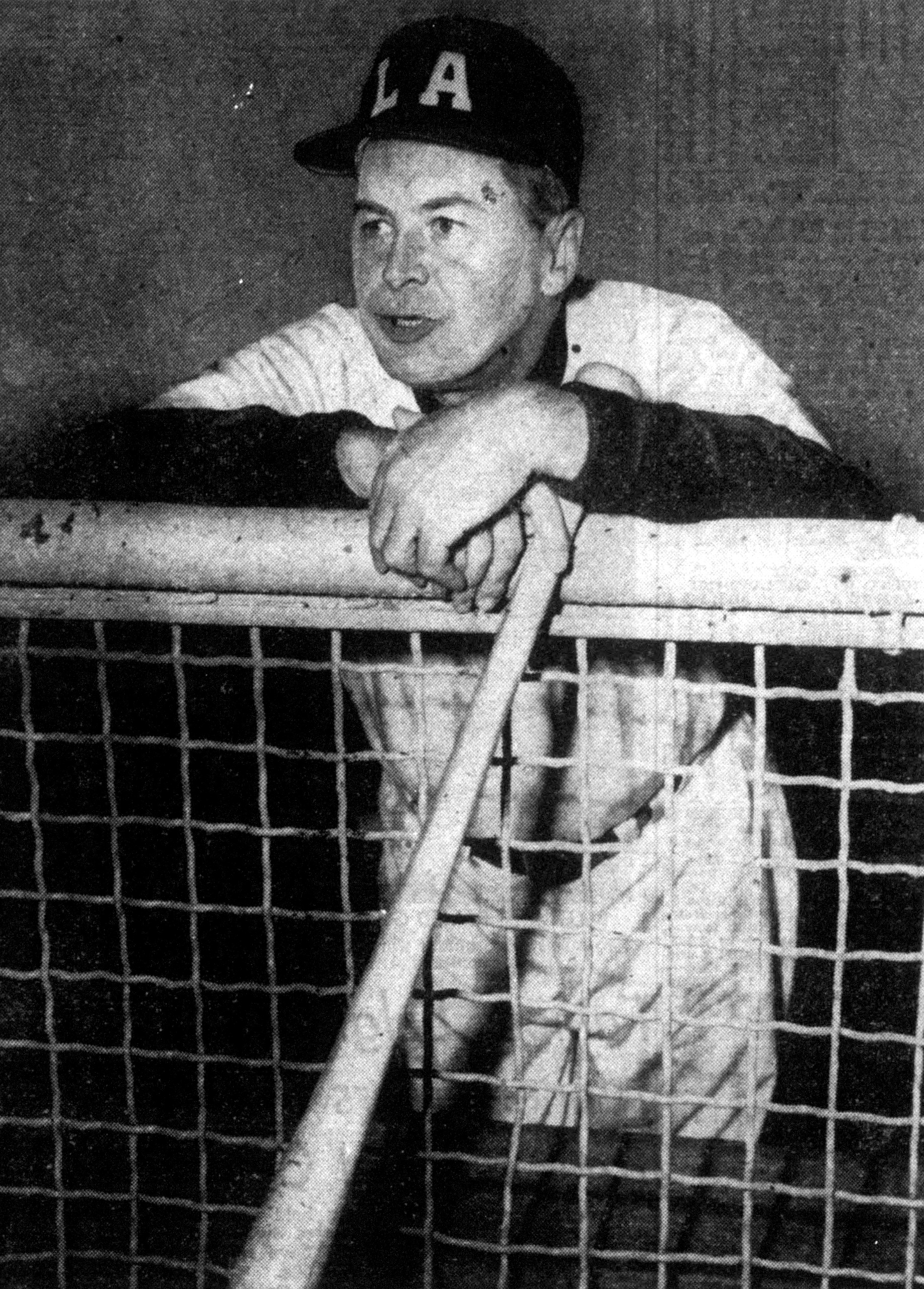
Hack managing the Los Angeles Angels in 1953.

1957 postcard of Hack for the St. Louis Cardinals

Hack became a minor league manager, leading Des Moines in 1948–49, Springfield in 1950 and the Los Angeles Angels from 1951 to 1953. He then took over as Cubs manager in spring training of 1954, replacing Cavarretta. They had losing campaigns during each of his three seasons running the team. He became a batting coach for the St. Louis Cardinals in 1957–58, managing them for the last ten games in 1958, and then returned to managing in the minor leagues in Denver (1959), Salt Lake City (1965) and Dallas-Fort Worth (1966).

== Personal life and post-career ==
Hack (left) and Seattle Rainers manager Rogers Hornsby (right) in 1951

He later became a restaurant manager, with his second wife Gwen, and died at age 70 in Dixon, Illinois in 1979 after an extended illness. His first wife Dorothy Weisel Hack was a prominent amateur tennis player. He is buried in Grand Detour Cemetery in Grand Detour, Illinois. Stan had two sons with Gwen: Stanford Hack and David Hack. David had two sons with his first wife, Diane: Michael and Robert Hack, then a son and daughter with his second wife, Deb: Steven and Rebecca.

== See also ==
- List of Major League Baseball career hits leaders
- List of Major League Baseball career runs scored leaders
- List of Major League Baseball annual stolen base leaders
- List of Major League Baseball career stolen bases leaders
- List of Major League Baseball players who spent their entire career with one franchise
- List of St. Louis Cardinals coaches
