= Gashouse Gang =

1930s St. Louis Cardinals baseball team nickname

The Gashouse Gang was the nickname of the St. Louis Cardinals baseball team that dominated the National League from the late 1920s to the early 1930s. The Cardinals won a total of five National League pennants from 1926 to 1934, and three World Series championships (1926, 1931, 1934).

== Background ==
The team started out in Major League Baseball as a member of the American Association as the Brown Stockings; they won four straight AA pennants before moving to the National League in 1892. St. Louis struggled through three decades of mediocrity, during which they finished above fourth place just six times, matching their finishes below ninth place. The Cardinals, owned by Sam Breadon with Branch Rickey as general manager and Rogers Hornsby as player-turned-manager, cultivated talent that paid off in 1926. Flint Rhem was their only twenty-game winner, while Bob O'Farrell was the National League MVP and Jim Bottomley drove in the most runs for a team that scored the most runs in the league as they narrowly beat the Cincinnati Reds by two games with an 89–65 record to win the pennant. It was their first pennant since 1888. In the 1926 World Series, the Cardinals faced the New York Yankees. After the Cardinals won two of the first three games, the Yankees came back two win the next two games to put the Cardinals on the ropes for Game 6 and 7, which the Cardinals won in New York to win their first championship. The next year's team won three more games but fell short of the pennant by 1.5 games. However, the 1928 team won the league pennant with 95 victories, with Bottomley winning the MVP Award once again as the Cardinals narrowly beat the New York Giants by two games with Bill McKechnie now as manager. In the 1928 World Series, they met the Yankees again but lost in a straight sweep. In the 1929 season, the Cardinals had three different managers—McKechnie, Gabby Street, and Billy Southworth (who had played for the Cardinals for the last three seasons of his career)—and went 78–74. Street was retained as manager for the 1930 season.

== Overview ==
The nickname Gashouse Gang, by most accounts, came from the team's generally very shabby appearance and rough-and-tumble tactics. An opponent once stated the Cardinals players usually went into the field in unwashed, dirty, and smelly uniforms, which alone spread horror among their rivals. According to one account, shortstop Leo Durocher coined the term. He and his teammates were speaking derisively of the American League, and the consensus was that the Redbirds—should they prevail in the National League race—would handle whoever won the American League pennant. "Why, they wouldn't even let us in that league over there", Durocher, who had played for the New York Yankees, observed. "They think we're just a bunch of gashousers." The phrase gas house referred to factories that turned coal into town gas for lighting and cooking. Common in U.S. cities until the widespread use of natural gas, the plants were noted for their foul smell and were typically located near railroad yards in the poorest neighborhood in the city. Another explanation holds that the name comes from Dizzy Dean, who played at City Park (renamed McKechnie Field in 1962), in Bradenton, Florida, for spring training in the 1930s. The story goes that Dean liked the city so much, he bought a local gas station and hung out there when he wasn't playing.

The team was led by general manager Branch Rickey and playing manager Frankie Frisch and included other stars such as Joe Medwick and Ripper Collins. Many of the players on the Cardinals roster, including the Dean brothers, Bill DeLancey, Pepper Martin, Spud Davis, and Burgess Whitehead, were Southerners or Southwesterners from working-class backgrounds.

The 1930 Cardinals won 92 games. Every player on the 1930 team with 300 or more at-bats had a batting average of .300 or higher, for the first and only time in baseball history. They won the pennant by two games and faced the Philadelphia Athletics in the World Series. In the 1930 World Series, the Cardinals, a high-scoring offense, only scored more than three runs once in the Series, which they lost in six games.

The 1934 team featured five regulars who hit at least .300, a 30-game winner in Dizzy Dean (the last National League pitcher to win 30 games in a single season, and the last pitcher in Major League Baseball to do so until Denny McLain accomplished the feat for the 1968 Detroit Tigers), and four All-Stars, including player-manager Frisch. Not among the All-Stars was Collins, the first baseman who led the team in sixteen offensive categories with stats like a .333 batting average, a .615 slugging percentage, 35 home runs, and 128 runs batted in. The following year was historic for the Cardinals, who went 101–53 for their first 100-win season ever, winning the pennant by thirteen games, with Bill Hallahan saving Game 7 to beat Philadelphia in the 1931 World Series. In the next two seasons, they finished sixth and fifth before Street was replaced by Frankie Frisch midway through the 1933 season. The 1934 team received the nickname that stuck. Dizzy Dean won thirty games, playing alongside player-manager Frisch and other perennial stars. In the 1934 World Series, the Cards and Tigers split the first two games in Detroit, and the Tigers took two of the next three in St. Louis. St. Louis proceeded to win the next two, including an 11–0 embarrassment of the Tigers in Detroit to win the Series. The stars for the Cards were Medwick, who had a .379 batting average with one of St. Louis's two home runs and a series-high five RBI, and the Dean brothers, who combined for all four of the team's wins with 28 strikeouts and a 1.43 earned run average.

== Aftermath and legacy ==
The Cardinals finished in second place four times in the next seven seasons with no pennants. With a new generation of players and the return of Southworth as manager in 1940, the Cardinals won three World Series titles in five seasons from 1942 to 1946. From the teams of 1926 to 1934, fourteen total individuals who played or managed the Cardinals were inducted into the National Baseball Hall of Fame and Museum: Rogers Hornsby, Grover Cleveland Alexander, Jim Bottomley, Chick Hafey, Jesse Haines, Billy Southworth, Dizzy Dean, Leo Durocher, Frankie Frisch, Joe Medwick, Dazzy Vance, Bill McKechnie, Rabbit Maranville, and Burleigh Grimes. Branch Rickey, the Cards’ general manager, was also inducted.

== In popular culture ==
- Several Cardinal players participated in the informal "Mudcat Band." Lon Warneke played guitar and sang, Pepper Martin played harmonica and guitar, Bill McGee played a fiddle, Bob Weiland blew into a jug, and outfielder Frenchy Bordagaray "played a contraption that included a washboard, a car horn, a whistle, and an electric light." The band wore variants of the Cardinal uniform (with "Mudcats" replacing "Cardinals" on the birds-on-the-bat logo) and played gigs around the Midwest and South on off-days and during the off-season.
- In Goliath season 2 episode 3 "Yeah, well, I like to think that we're the Gashouse Gang, – so fuck the Yankees."
- One of the teams in the 1946 Warner Bros. cartoon Baseball Bugs was the "Gashouse Gorillas".
- Country-bluegrass band Old Crow Medicine Show refers to them in the song "Caroline" on their 2008 album Tennessee Pusher.
- In the 1938 George Cukor remake of the 1930 Romantic comedy film Holiday, starring Cary Grant and Katharine Hepburn, Professor Potter (played by Edward Everett Horton) and his wife (played by Jean Dixon) enter a sophisticated and pompous New Year's Eve Party where they feel uncomfortably under dressed and out of place. They escape to the fourth floor where they hear simple music coming from Hepburn's room, and Professor Potter happily says, "It's the Gashouse Gang, darling."
- In 2015, author Carolyn E. Mueller and illustrator Ed Koehler, in association with Reedy Press, LLC published an illustrated book titled "Dizzy Dean and the Gashouse Gang." (ISBN 978-1-68106-002-6) The book showcases the antics of Dizzy and his brother Paul Dean, Joe Medwick, Pepper Martin, player/manager Frankie Frisch, and the 1934 St. Louis Cardinals season in their quest to win their third World Series.

== See also ==
- 1934 St. Louis Cardinals season
