= 1934 World Series =

1934 Major League Baseball championship series

Team (Wins)	Managers	Season
St. Louis Cardinals (4)	Frankie Frisch (player/manager)	95–58, .621, GA: 2
Detroit Tigers (3)	Mickey Cochrane (player/manager)	101–53, .656, GA: 7
- Dates: October 3–9
- Venue(s): Navin Field (Detroit); Sportsman's Park (St. Louis)
- Umpires: Brick Owens (AL), Bill Klem (NL); Harry Geisel (AL), Beans Reardon (NL)
- Hall of Famers: Umpire: Bill Klem; Cardinals: Dizzy Dean; Leo Durocher‡ Frankie Frisch; Jesse Haines; Joe Medwick; Dazzy Vance; Tigers: Mickey Cochrane; Charlie Gehringer; Goose Goslin; Hank Greenberg ‡ Elected as a manager

Broadcast
- Radio: NBC; CBS; WWJ (DET)
- Radio announcers: NBC: Tom Manning; Ford Bond; Graham McNamee; Don Wilson; CBS: France Laux; Pat Flanagan; Ted Husing; WWJ: Ty Tyson

The 1934 World Series was the championship series in Major League Baseball for the 1934 season. The 31st edition of the World Series, it matched the St. Louis Cardinals against the Detroit Tigers. The Cardinals' "Gashouse Gang" won in seven games for their third championship in nine years.

The Cardinals and Tigers split the first two games in Detroit, and Detroit took two of the next three in St. Louis. But St. Louis won the next two in Detroit, including an 11–0 embarrassment in Game 7 to win the Series. The stars for the Cardinals were Joe ("Ducky") Medwick, who hit .379 and one of St. Louis' two home runs, Jack Rothrock, who hit a series-high 6 RBI's, and the meteoric ("Me 'n' Paul") Dean brothers, Dizzy and Paul (or "Daffy") Dean, who won two games each with a combined 28 strikeouts and a minuscule 1.43 earned run average. The 1934 World Series was also the last in which both teams were led by player-managers, in this case the Cardinals' Frankie Frisch and the Tigers' Mickey Cochrane.

== Background ==
This was the first World Series matchup between the Tigers and Cardinals.

The Cardinals, led by the Dean brothers, used only six other pitchers in amassing a team earned-run average of 2.34 for their 1934 Series victory,

Pete Fox played for the losing team, yet became the only player in Series history, as of 2021, to hit six doubles in a World Series.

For his top-of-the-sixth triple in Game 7, Joe Medwick slid hard into Tiger third baseman Marv Owen. They tangled briefly, and when Medwick went back to his position in left field for the bottom of the inning enraged Tiger fans, knowing the game was all but lost (the score was 9–0 by then), vented their frustrations on him, pelting him with fruit, vegetables, bottles and cushions among other things. It was a feat for him to make the catch of a fly ball instead of the orange thrown close to it. Commissioner Landis ordered Medwick out of the game, ending the ruckus. Newsreel footage shows Medwick slamming his glove against the dugout bench in disgust. It was the only time a Commissioner has ejected a player from any major league game.(Audio)

Dizzy Dean nearly took himself out of the Series on a play in Game 4. In the fourth inning, he pinch-ran and broke up a double play the hard way; i.e., by taking the errant relay throw to first flush on the noggin. The great Dean lay unconscious on the field. (He was later to protest, "Hell, it was only a glancing blow.") He was rushed to a hospital for observation, where he was given a clean bill of health. Legend has it that at least one newspaper the next day featured the headline, "X-ray of Dean's head shows nothing." Be that as it may, ol' Diz recovered rapidly enough to start Game 5 (a 3–1 loss to Tiger curveballer Tommy Bridges) the very next day.

According to Charles Einstein's The Fireside Book of Baseball, in the midst of the Cardinals' Game 7 rout, player-manager Frankie Frisch, the "Fordham Flash", called time and walked out to the mound from second base to warn Diz, "If you don't stop clowning around, I'll take you out of the game." Dizzy said, "No you won't." Frisch thought about this a moment, then retreated to second.

== Summary ==
NL St. Louis Cardinals (4) vs. AL Detroit Tigers (3)

Game	Date	Score	Location	Time	Attendance
1	October 3	St. Louis Cardinals – 8, Detroit Tigers – 3	Navin Field	2:13	42,505
2	October 4	St. Louis Cardinals – 2, Detroit Tigers – 3 (12)	Navin Field	2:49	43,451
3	October 5	Detroit Tigers – 1, St. Louis Cardinals – 4	Sportsman's Park	2:07	34,073
4	October 6	Detroit Tigers – 10, St. Louis Cardinals – 4	Sportsman's Park	2:43	37,492
5	October 7	Detroit Tigers – 3, St. Louis Cardinals – 1	Sportsman's Park	1:58	38,536
6	October 8	St. Louis Cardinals – 4, Detroit Tigers – 3	Navin Field	1:58	44,551
7	October 9	St. Louis Cardinals – 11, Detroit Tigers – 0	Navin Field	2:19	40,902

== Matchups ==
=== Game 1 ===
Wednesday, October 3, 1934 1:30 pm (ET) at Navin Field in Detroit, Michigan
Team	1	2	3	4	5	6	7	8	9	R	H	E
St. Louis	0	2	1	0	1	4	0	0	0	8	13	2
Detroit	0	0	1	0	0	1	0	1	0	3	8	5
WP: Dizzy Dean (1–0) LP: General Crowder (0–1); Home runs: STL: Joe Medwick (1); DET: Hank Greenberg (1)

The series opener in Detroit pitted the Cardinals' 30-game winner, Dizzy Dean, against the Tigers' "General" Crowder. The subpar Tiger defense behind the General let him down with five errors and three unearned runs.

In the top of the second, the Gashouse Gang loaded the bases with a single and two errors; a single by Jack Rothrock then brought home both Ernie Orsatti and Dean to make it 2–0. In the third inning, St. Louis tacked on another run due to more shoddy Detroit fielding. Medwick singled and was forced out at second by Ripper Collins, but a throwing error by Tiger shortstop Billy Rogell allowed Collins to move to second and then score on another error by Detroit's star first baseman, Hank Greenberg. In the bottom of the third, Charlie Gehringer got the Tigers on the board with a single that drove in Jo-Jo White, but in the St. Louis fifth Medwick tattooed a home run off Crowder for a 4–1 Cardinal lead.

The Gang then exploded for a four-run sixth off Firpo Marberry (who had relieved Crowder) and Elon Hogsett, as Pepper Martin and Medwick each cracked RBI singles and Bill DeLancey lashed a two-run double to left. Though Detroit put up single runs in the sixth and eighth (via a Goose Goslin single that scored Greenberg and a home run by Greenberg), they could get no closer, as Dean struck out Gee Walker to give St. Louis an 8–3 win and a 1–0 lead in the series.

=== Game 2 ===
Thursday, October 4, 1934 1:30 pm (ET) at Navin Field in Detroit, Michigan
Team	1	2	3	4	5	6	7	8	9	10	11	12	R	H	E
St. Louis	0	1	1	0	0	0	0	0	0	0	0	0	2	7	3
Detroit	0	0	0	1	0	0	0	0	1	0	0	1	3	7	0
WP: Schoolboy Rowe (1–0) LP: Bill Walker (0–1)

The second game saw Bill Hallahan for St. Louis matched against Schoolboy Rowe for the Tigers in what became a tight affair, with Rowe pitching 12 innings. The Cardinals drew first blood when Bill DeLancey hit a one-out single that then saw Ernie Orsatti hit a deep fly ball to left for a triple to score DeLancey. In the next inning, Joe Medwick hit a two-out single to double the lead for the Cardinals. The Tigers responded in the fourth inning with a two-out double by Pete Fox to narrow the lead to one before the Tigers were down to their last batters in the 9th. A leadoff single by Fox and subsequent bunt sacrifice by Schoolboy Rowe led to Gee Walker stepping up to the plate. He hit a fly ball to left center that dropped in for a single to score Fox and send the game to extras. Both teams saw a runner reach second base but fail to score in extras before the 12th inning.

With the 2-3-4 coming up for Detroit in the 12th, they finally broke through. Charlie Gehringer and Hank Greenberg each drew walks with one out to set the stage for Goose Goslin, who delivered a base hit to center that scored Gehringer to give the Tigers the win.

=== Game 3 ===
Friday, October 5, 1934 1:30 pm (CT) at Sportsman's Park in St. Louis, Missouri
Team	1	2	3	4	5	6	7	8	9	R	H	E
Detroit	0	0	0	0	0	0	0	0	1	1	8	2
St. Louis	1	1	0	0	2	0	0	0	X	4	9	1
WP: Paul Dean (1–0) LP: Tommy Bridges (0–1)

The Tigers left 13 men on base as Pepper Martin's double, triple and two runs scored enabled the Cardinals to win, 4–1.

=== Game 4 ===
Saturday, October 6, 1934 1:30 pm (CT) at Sportsman's Park in St. Louis, Missouri
Team	1	2	3	4	5	6	7	8	9	R	H	E
Detroit	0	0	3	1	0	0	1	5	0	10	13	1
St. Louis	0	1	1	2	0	0	0	0	0	4	10	5
WP: Elden Auker (1–0) LP: Bill Walker (0–2)

The Tigers evened the series, winning 10–4, with five runs in the eighth. Hank Greenberg had four hits and three RBI and Billy Rogell had four RBI.

This game was the first time that the song, "Take Me Out to the Ball Game", was played during the World Series, after being played at a high school game earlier that year in Los Angeles.

=== Game 5 ===
Sunday, October 7, 1934 1:30 pm (CT) at Sportsman's Park in St. Louis, Missouri
Team	1	2	3	4	5	6	7	8	9	R	H	E
Detroit	0	1	0	0	0	2	0	0	0	3	7	0
St. Louis	0	0	0	0	0	0	1	0	0	1	7	1
WP: Tommy Bridges (1–1) LP: Dizzy Dean (1–1); Home runs: DET: Charlie Gehringer (1); STL: Bill DeLancey (1)

Tommy Bridges won after just one day of rest. Charlie Gehringer's home run in the sixth was the game-winning hit.

=== Game 6 ===
Monday, October 8, 1934 1:30 pm (ET) at Navin Field in Detroit, Michigan
Team	1	2	3	4	5	6	7	8	9	R	H	E
St. Louis	1	0	0	0	2	0	1	0	0	4	10	2
Detroit	0	0	1	0	0	2	0	0	0	3	7	1
WP: Paul Dean (2–0) LP: Schoolboy Rowe (1–1)

Paul Dean won his second game of the series and helped his own cause with a game-winning single in the seventh inning.

=== Game 7 ===
Tuesday, October 9, 1934 1:30 pm (ET) at Navin Field in Detroit, Michigan
Team	1	2	3	4	5	6	7	8	9	R	H	E
St. Louis	0	0	7	0	0	2	2	0	0	11	17	1
Detroit	0	0	0	0	0	0	0	0	0	0	6	3
WP: Dizzy Dean (2–1) LP: Elden Auker (1–1)

The Cardinals easily won Game 7, 11–0, behind Dizzy Dean. Ducky Medwick was taken out of the game for his own safety after sliding hard into third baseman Marv Owen and being pelted by the crowd with bottles and fruit when he took the field in the sixth inning.

== Composite line score ==
1934 World Series (4–3): St. Louis Cardinals (N.L.) over Detroit Tigers (A.L.)

Team	1	2	3	4	5	6	7	8	9	10	11	12	R	H	E
St. Louis Cardinals	2	5	10	2	5	6	4	0	0	0	0	0	34	73	15
Detroit Tigers	0	1	5	2	0	5	1	6	2	0	0	1	23	56	12
Total attendance: 281,510 Average attendance: 40,216; Winning player's share: $5,390 Losing player's share: $3,355

== Brothers ==
Other brothers who appeared in the same World Series, either as teammates or opponents, before the Deans were:

- – Doc Johnston and Jimmy Johnston (1920)
- – Bob Meusel and Irish Meusel (1921, 1922 and 1923)
- – Paul Waner and Lloyd Waner (1927)

== Aftermath ==
The Tigers would finally earn redemption in the World Series the following year, as they defeated the Chicago Cubs in six games to win not just their first championship, but the first professional sports championship for the city of Detroit in general.

The Cardinals would win their next championship in 1942, where they defeated the New York Yankees in five games, which marked the start of a dynasty for the Cardinals from 1942 to 1946 in which they won three titles in five seasons.

The Tigers and Cardinals would meet again in the World Series twice more. They next met in 1968, where the Tigers returned the favor and defeated the Cardinals in seven games after trailing 3–1 in the series and being nine outs away from elimination in Game 5. They also met again in 2006, where the 83-win Cardinals defeated a heavily favored Tigers squad in five games in one of the most shocking upsets in the history of the Fall Classic.
