= Tommy Bridges =

American baseball player (1906–1968)

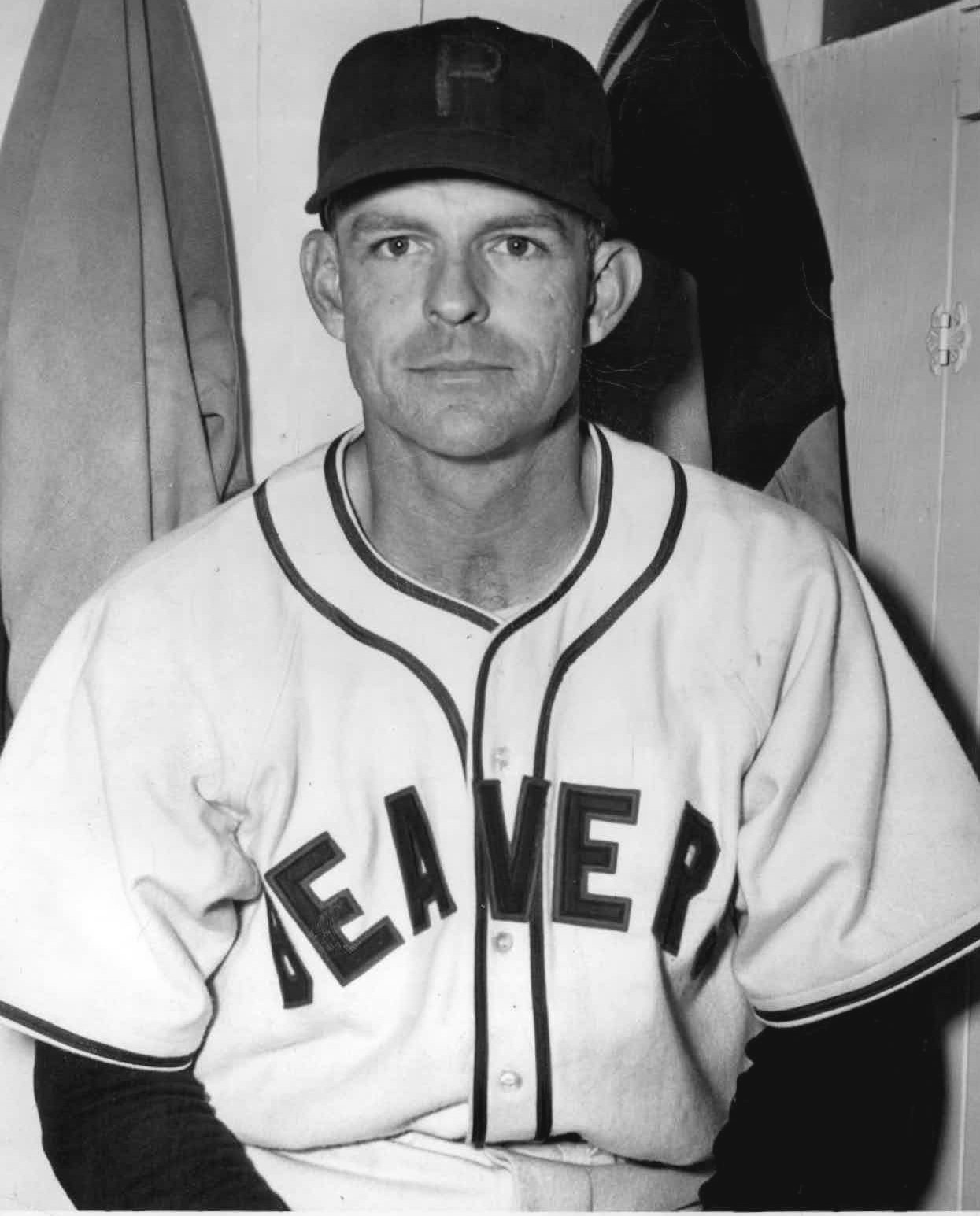
- Bridges c. 1947
- Pitcher
- Born: December 28, 1906; Gordonsville, Tennessee, U.S.
- Died: April 19, 1968 (aged 61); Nashville, Tennessee, U.S.
- Batted: Right Threw: Right

MLB debut
- August 13, 1930, for the Detroit Tigers

Last MLB appearance
- July 20, 1946, for the Detroit Tigers

MLB statistics
- Win–loss record: 194–138
- Earned run average: 3.57
- Strikeouts: 1,674
- Stats at Baseball Reference

Teams
- Detroit Tigers (1930–1943; 1945–1946)

Career highlights and awards
- 6× All-Star (1934–1937, 1939, 1940); 2× World Series champion (1935, 1945); AL wins leader (1936); 2× AL strikeout leader (1935, 1936)

Thomas Jefferson Davis Bridges (December 28, 1906 – April 19, 1968) was an American right-handed pitcher in Major League Baseball who played his entire career with the Detroit Tigers from 1930 to 1946. During the 1930s, he used an outstanding curveball to become one of the mainstays of the team's pitching staff, winning 20 games in three consecutive seasons and helping the team to its first World Series championship with two victories in the 1935 Series. He retired with 1,674 career strikeouts, then the eighth highest total in American League history, and held the Tigers franchise record for career strikeouts from 1941 to 1951.

== Early years ==
Born in Gordonsville, Tennessee, Bridges attended the University of Tennessee, and after having a 20-strikeout game for the minor league Wheeling Stogies in 1929, he joined the Tigers in 1930.

== Major league career ==
In his first major league game, he got Babe Ruth to pop out on his first major league pitch.

On August 5, 1932, he came within one out of throwing a perfect game. With two outs in the ninth inning, and the Washington Senators trailing 13–0, the Senators pitcher was due to bat. Washington manager Walter Johnson sent pinch hitter Dave Harris to bat, who led the AL that season with 14 pinch hits. Harris hit a single to break up the perfect game.

He one-hit the St. Louis Browns on April 23, 1933, at Navin Field. Bridges had another one-hitter against the Senators, on May 24, 1933, allowing a home run to Joe Kuhel in the eighth inning. On September 24, 1933, Bridges reached the ninth inning with a no-hitter for the fourth time in two years. This time, he gave up a pair of hits but beat the St Louis Browns 2–1. For the 1933 season, Bridges had a 3.09 earned run average (ERA) (139 Adjusted ERA+), second-best in the American League.

In 1934, Bridges was 22–11 with 23 complete games to help the Tigers win their first pennant in 25 years. Bridges also surrendered Ruth's 700th home run on July 13, 1934. In the 1934 World Series, Bridges pitched a complete-game victory, beating Dizzy Dean 3–1 in Game 5, but the Tigers lost the Series in seven games.

Bridges had another strong season in 1935, going 21–10 with 23 complete games. He also pitched a complete-game victory in the last game of the 1935 World Series. With the score tied 3–3 in the top of the ninth, Bridges gave up a leadoff triple to Stan Hack, but retired the next three batters without the runner on third scoring. In the bottom of the ninth, Goose Goslin drove in the winning run with two outs, and the Tigers won their first championship. After the game, manager Mickey Cochrane said the following of Bridges's gutsy performance:

A hundred and fifty pounds of courage. If there ever is a payoff on courage, this little 150 pound pitcher is the greatest World Series hero.

In a nationwide poll Bridges was named the No. 2 sports hero of 1935, behind Notre Dame football player Andy Pilney.

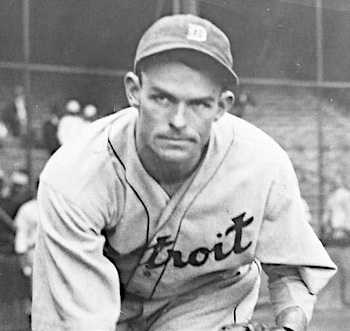
Bridges, circa 1935

After winning over 20 games in both 1934 and 1935, Bridges led the AL in 1936 with 23 wins, and finished ninth in the MVP voting.

On August 11, 1942, Bridges was involved in one of the great pitching duels of all time. Cleveland starter, Al Milnar had a no-hitter until Doc Cramer singled with two out in the 9th. Milnar's scoreless duel with Bridges ended in a 14-inning scoreless tie because the rules did not permit the game to be continued under the lights.

Bridges served in the U.S. Army during World War II, missing the entire 1944 season and coming back in time for only one start in 1945. He was a member of the Tigers 1945 World Series championship team, his fourth Series, making a relief appearance in Game 6.

Bridges and Hank Greenberg are the only players in Detroit Tigers history to play in four World Series for the team, having appeared in the 1934, 1935, 1940, and 1945 World Series.

=== Minor league career ===
Sent to the minors in 1946, he pitched for four years with the Portland Beavers in the Pacific Coast League. On April 20, 1947, pitching for Beavers, Bridges finally got his no-hitter, beating San Francisco 2–0. Bridges also led the Pacific Coast League in ERA in 1947, but never pitched in the majors again.

== Life after baseball ==
Bridges' life outside the major leagues took a downward turn, in part due to alcoholism, which developed during his war service. In 1950 Bridges left his wife for another woman; former teammates were shocked by his appearance. In 1951, he became a scout and coach for the Cincinnati Reds, and he was later a scout for the Tigers, and New York Mets.

Bridges died in Nashville, Tennessee in 1968 at age 61.

== Legacy ==
Bridges was one of the best pitchers in baseball from 1931 until 1943, when he entered the Army. He was among the league leaders in ERA 10 times between 1932 and 1943, including a career-low 2.39 ERA in 1943—the year before Bridges entered the Army. Bridges ranked 8th in wins for the 1930s with 150 and 5th in strikeouts with 1,207. Over his major league career, he compiled an Adjusted ERA+ of 126—ranking 54th best in major league history. Though his unadjusted ERA is less impressive because of the high batting averages in the years in which he pitched, Bridges had an Adjusted ERA+ in excess of 140 on six occasions: 1932–33, 1939–40, 1942–43. He was named an All-Star six times between 1934 and 1940, missing out only in 1938 due to an injury. Bridges was also a consistent leader in strikeouts. He led the AL in strikeouts in 1935 and 1936 and was among the league leaders twelve times: 1931–40, 1942–43. Even more telling, he was among the top three in the league in strikeouts per nine innings pitched on seven occasions: 1931, 1935–36, 1939–40, 1942–43. In 1941, he set the Tigers career strikeout record, surpassing George Mullin's mark of 1,380. His team record for career strikeouts was broken in 1951 by Hal Newhouser, and remained the top mark for a right-hander until Jack Morris broke it in 1988. Bridges' career record with the Tigers was 194–138 with a 3.57 ERA.

Bridges said that "Movement, location, and change of speed is the key to pitching success." He was one of future MLB pitcher Ned Garver's favorite players growing up.

== See also ==
- List of Major League Baseball annual strikeout leaders
- List of Major League Baseball annual wins leaders
- List of Major League Baseball players who spent their entire career with one franchise
- List of Detroit Tigers team records
