= 1935 World Series =

1935 Major League Baseball championship series

Team (Wins)	Managers	Season
Detroit Tigers (4)	Mickey Cochrane (player/manager)	93–58, .616, GA: 3
Chicago Cubs (2)	Charlie Grimm	100–54, .649, GA: 4
- Dates: October 2–7
- Venue(s): Navin Field (Detroit); Wrigley Field (Chicago)
- Umpires: George Moriarty (AL), Ernie Quigley (NL), Bill McGowan (AL), Dolly Stark (NL)
- Hall of Famers: Umpire: Bill McGowan; Tigers: Mickey Cochrane; Charlie Gehringer; Goose Goslin; Hank Greenberg; Cubs: Gabby Hartnett; Billy Herman; Chuck Klein; Freddie Lindstrom

Broadcast
- Radio: NBC; CBS; Mutual
- Radio announcers: NBC: Hal Totten; Ty Tyson; Boake Carter; CBS: France Laux; Truman Bradley; Jack Graney; Mutual: Bob Elson; Red Barber; Quin Ryan

The 1935 World Series was the championship series in Major League Baseball for the 1935 season. The 32nd edition of the World Series, it matched the Detroit Tigers and the Chicago Cubs. The Tigers won in six games for their first championship in five Series appearances, as they had lost in 1907, 1908, 1909, and 1934. This was the first championship ever won by a Detroit-based team, but would be followed by the Lions winning their first NFL championship, and the Red Wings in 1936 winning the Stanley Cup for their first NHL championship. The date April 18, 1936 was designated Champions Day in Michigan by the state Governor Frank Fitzgerald.

The Tigers won despite losing the services of first baseman Hank Greenberg. In Game 2, Greenberg collided with Cubs catcher Gabby Hartnett and broke his wrist, sidelining him for the rest of the Series.

The Cubs had won 21 consecutive games in September (still a club record), eventually taking the National League pennant by four games over the defending World Series champions, the St. Louis Cardinals.

In Game 6, Tommy Bridges pitched a complete-game victory to win the Series for Detroit. With the score tied 3–3 in the top of the ninth inning, Bridges gave up a leadoff triple to Stan Hack, but retired the next three batters without the runner on third scoring. In the bottom of the ninth, Goose Goslin drove in the winning run with two outs. After the game, manager Mickey Cochrane said the following of Bridges' gutsy performance: "A hundred and fifty pounds of courage. If there ever is a payoff on courage this little 150-pound pitcher is the greatest World Series hero."

In addition to Bridges, the Tigers had a hitting hero. Right fielder Pete Fox accumulated ten hits and an average of .385 for the Series. Fox hit safely in all six games.

Detroit owner Frank Navin, then 64 years old, had been running the organization for 30 years and had seen four of his teams win American League pennants, only to lose four World Series. Six weeks after the Tigers finally won the World Series in October 1935, Navin suffered a heart attack while riding a horse and died.

== Summary ==
AL Detroit Tigers (4) vs. NL Chicago Cubs (2)

Game	Date	Score	Location	Time	Attendance
1	October 2	Chicago Cubs – 3, Detroit Tigers – 0	Navin Field	1:51	47,391
2	October 3	Chicago Cubs – 3, Detroit Tigers – 8	Navin Field	1:59	46,742
3	October 4	Detroit Tigers – 6, Chicago Cubs – 5 (10)	Wrigley Field	2:27	45,532
4	October 5	Detroit Tigers – 2, Chicago Cubs – 1	Wrigley Field	2:28	49,350
5	October 6	Detroit Tigers – 1, Chicago Cubs – 3	Wrigley Field	1:49	49,237
6	October 7	Chicago Cubs – 3, Detroit Tigers – 4	Navin Field	1:57	48,420

== Matchups ==
=== Game 1 ===
Wednesday, October 2, 1935 1:30 pm (ET) at Navin Field in Detroit, Michigan
Team	1	2	3	4	5	6	7	8	9	R	H	E
Chicago	2	0	0	0	0	0	0	0	1	3	7	0
Detroit	0	0	0	0	0	0	0	0	0	0	4	3
WP: Lon Warneke (1–0) LP: Schoolboy Rowe (0–1); Home runs: CHC: Frank Demaree (1); DET: None

A pitching duel between Lon Warneke and Schoolboy Rowe, both of whom went the distance, was decided by its leadoff batter, Augie Galan, doubling, and scoring on an error by Rowe that allowed Billy Herman to reach and eventually score on a Gabby Hartnett single. Frank Demaree added a homer in the ninth inning for the visiting Cubs.

=== Game 2 ===
Thursday, October 3, 1935 1:30 pm (ET) at Navin Field in Detroit, Michigan
Team	1	2	3	4	5	6	7	8	9	R	H	E
Chicago	0	0	0	0	1	0	2	0	0	3	6	1
Detroit	4	0	0	3	0	0	1	0	X	8	9	2
WP: Tommy Bridges (1–0) LP: Charlie Root (0–1); Home runs: CHC: None; DET: Hank Greenberg (1)

In the bottom of the first, Jo-Jo White hit a leadoff single and scored on a double by Mickey Cochrane, who scored on Charlie Gehringer's single before Hank Greenberg's two-run home run knocked Cubs' starter Charlie Root out of the game. In the fourth, Roy Henshaw got two outs before letting the Tigers load the bases on a single, hit-by-pitch and walk. A wild pitch scored a run, then after a walk reloaded the bases, Gehringer's two-run single made it 7–0 Tigers. The Cubs got on the board in the fifth when Phil Cavarretta reached first on an error, moved to second on a groundout and scored on Billy Jurges's single. The Cubs got two more runs in the seventh on Billy Herman's single with runners on second and third, but the Tigers added a run in the bottom half on Pete Fox's RBI single off Fabian Kowalik. Tommy Bridges pitched a complete game as the Tigers' 8–3 tied the series heading to Chicago.

=== Game 3 ===
Friday, October 4, 1935 1:30 pm (CT) at Wrigley Field in Chicago, Illinois
Team	1	2	3	4	5	6	7	8	9	10	11	R	H	E
Detroit	0	0	0	0	0	1	0	4	0	0	1	6	12	2
Chicago	0	2	0	0	1	0	0	0	2	0	0	5	10	3
WP: Schoolboy Rowe (1–1) LP: Larry French (0–1); Home runs: DET: None; CHC: Frank Demaree (2)

In Game 3, Frank Demaree's leadoff home run in the second off Elden Auker put Chicago on the board. A one-out single and subsequent error put runners on first and third before Bill Lee's ground out made it 2–0 Cubs. They added a run in the fifth when Billy Jurges drew a leadoff walk, moved to second on a sacrifice bunt and scored on Augie Galan's single. The Tigers got on the board in the sixth when Goose Goslin singled off Lee and scored on Pete Fox's triple. In the eighth, after a walk and double, Goslin's two-run single tied the game and knocked Lee out. Reliever Lon Warneke allowed two singles, the second of which to Billy Rogell scoring a run, then Fox stole home to make it 5–3 Tigers. Detroit brought back Game 1 starter Schoolboy Rowe in relief. He allowed three straight one-out singles in the ninth, the last of which to Ken O'Dea, before Augie Galan's sacrifice fly sent the game into extra innings, but Rowe nailed down the victory after Jo-Jo White's RBI single scored the winning run off Larry French in the 11th. This game remarkably featured four ejections. The Tigers lost coach Del Baker while The Cubs lost Woody English, Tuck Stainback and manager Charlie Grimm. Neither English nor Stainback were in the game.

=== Game 4 ===
Saturday, October 5, 1935 1:30 pm (CT) at Wrigley Field in Chicago, Illinois
Team	1	2	3	4	5	6	7	8	9	R	H	E
Detroit	0	0	1	0	0	1	0	0	0	2	7	0
Chicago	0	1	0	0	0	0	0	0	0	1	5	2
WP: General Crowder (1–0) LP: Tex Carleton (0–1); Home runs: DET: None; CHC: Gabby Hartnett (1)

Alvin "General" Crowder did it all for Detroit, pitching a complete-game five-hitter, allowing only one run on Gabby Hartnett's home run in the second, singling in the third and scoring his team's first run on Charlie Gehringer's RBI double, and getting Flea Clifton home as the go-ahead run with a groundout in the sixth off Tex Carleton aided by two errors. Chicago threatened against Crowder with a pair of one-out hits in the ninth, but Stan Hack grounded into a game-ending 6-4-3 double play.

=== Game 5 ===
Sunday, October 6, 1935 1:30 pm (CT) at Wrigley Field in Chicago, Illinois
Team	1	2	3	4	5	6	7	8	9	R	H	E
Detroit	0	0	0	0	0	0	0	0	1	1	7	1
Chicago	0	0	2	0	0	0	1	0	X	3	8	0
WP: Lon Warneke (2–0) LP: Schoolboy Rowe (1–2) Sv: Bill Lee (1); Home runs: DET: None; CHC: Chuck Klein (1)

Staving off elimination, the Cubs got a two-run home run from Chuck Klein after a leadoff triple in the second. They added another run in the seventh on Billy Herman's RBI double off Schoolboy Rowe. They replaced Lon Warneke after six innings with right-hander Bill Lee, who gave up Detroit's only run in the ninth on three consecutive singles (the last of which to Pete Fox before settling down to retire the final three batters.

This was the first of three World Series games that the Cubs have won in Wrigley Field (where they had previously lost 6 Series games). The other wins were Game 6 in 1945, and Game 5 in 2016.

=== Game 6 ===
Monday, October 7, 1935 1:30 pm (ET) at Navin Field in Detroit, Michigan
Team	1	2	3	4	5	6	7	8	9	R	H	E
Chicago	0	0	1	0	2	0	0	0	0	3	12	0
Detroit	1	0	0	1	0	1	0	0	1	4	12	1
WP: Tommy Bridges (2–0) LP: Larry French (0–2); Home runs: CHC: Billy Herman (1); DET: None

In Game 6, Pete Fox's RBI double off Larry French put the Tigers on the board. Billy Herman's RBI single tied the game in the third off Tommy Bridges, who put the Tigers back in front in the fourth with an RBI groundout with two on, but Herman's two-run home run in the fifth put the Cubs ahead 3–2. The Tigers tied the game in the sixth when Billy Rogell doubled with two outs and scored on Marv Owen's single. Stan Hack tripled to lead off the top of the ninth for the Cubs, but was left stranded at third. In the bottom of the ninth, Mickey Cochrane singled and moved to second on a groundout before Goose Goslin's walk-off single won it in front of Detroit's home fans, pitcher Tommy Bridges getting his second win of the Series. (Goslin, who also had the walk-off hit in Game 2 of the previous year's series, remains the only player to date to have walk-off hits in two World Series games.)

== Composite line score ==
1935 World Series (4–2): Detroit Tigers (A.L.) over Chicago Cubs (N.L.)

Team	1	2	3	4	5	6	7	8	9	10	11	R	H	E
Detroit Tigers	5	0	1	4	0	3	1	4	2	0	1	21	51	9
Chicago Cubs	2	3	3	0	4	0	3	0	3	0	0	18	48	6
Total attendance: 286,672 Average attendance: 47,779; Winning player's share: $6,545 Losing player's share: $4,199

== Detroit: "City of Champions" ==
When the Detroit Tigers won the 1935 World Series, the city of Detroit was mired in the Great Depression, which had hit the city and its industries particularly hard. However, with the success of the Tigers and other Detroit teams and athletes in 1935/36, Detroit's luck appeared to be changing, as the city was dubbed the "City of Champions." The Lions continued Detroit's winning ways by capturing the 1935 NFL Championship Game in December, followed by the Detroit Red Wings winning the Stanley Cup in April 1936. With the Stanley Cup win, the city had seen three major league championships in less than a year. Detroit's "champions" included Detroit's "Brown Bomber", Joe Louis, the heavyweight boxing champion who won that title in 1937; native Detroiter Gar Wood who was the champion of unlimited powerboat racing and the first man to go 100 miles per hour on water; and Eddie "the Midnight Express" Tolan, a black Detroiter who won gold medals in the 100- and 200-meter races at the 1932 Summer Olympics.

== Aftermath ==
The Tigers would return to the World Series in 1940 World Series, but they would narrowly fall to the Cincinnati Reds in seven games after being nine outs away from the championship in Game 7, which would be the last time the Tigers lost in the World Series until 2006. The Tigers would win their next title in 1945 in a rematch against the Cubs in seven games.

The Cubs returned to the World Series in 1938, but were swept by the New York Yankees, becoming the third victim of a Yankees four-peat from 1936 to 1939.
