= Tom Keegan =

American sportswriter and author (born 1959)

Tom Keegan is an American sportswriter and author who is sports editor of the Chesterton Tribune, a twice-weekly newspaper in Chesterton, Ind. He was a columnist at the Boston Herald until he was laid off on July 1, 2020. He was at the Lawrence Journal-World in Lawrence, Kansas. While in Kansas, Keegan, members of his staff, and local TV personalities combined to do sports podcasts entitled "Spodcasters" on KUsports.com, one of the newspaper's four websites. Keegan also was one of four panelists on a weekly television show The Drive, which is broadcast during the college football and basketball seasons throughout Kansas and nationally on Fox College Sports.

== Early years and education ==
Keegan was born in Rochester, New York, the seventh of 10 children. He attended Bishop Kearney High School in Irondequoit. He then went on to Marquette University where he graduated with a B.A. in journalism. Keegan married his wife Angie in Claremont, California. The couple have four children together.

== Career ==
Prior to arriving in the Midwest, Keegan worked for ESPN radio AM-1050 in New York City, until being replaced by Stephen A. Smith. Before that he spent several years in newspapers, writing for the New York Post, The Baltimore Sun, Daily Southtown in Chicago, the now-defunct The National Sports Daily and the Orange County Register.

He is also well known for writing three baseball books, including Sleeper Cars and Flannel Uniforms on the late Elden Auker, a submarine-style pitcher who is known as the last living hurler to face Babe Ruth. He also wrote a book about Ernie Harwell and a story documenting the history of the first-base position.

Keegan's responsibilities in Lawrence included lead columnist, where he wrote several columns a week on the University of Kansas football and basketball teams.
