= Joe Medwick =

American baseball player (1911–1975)

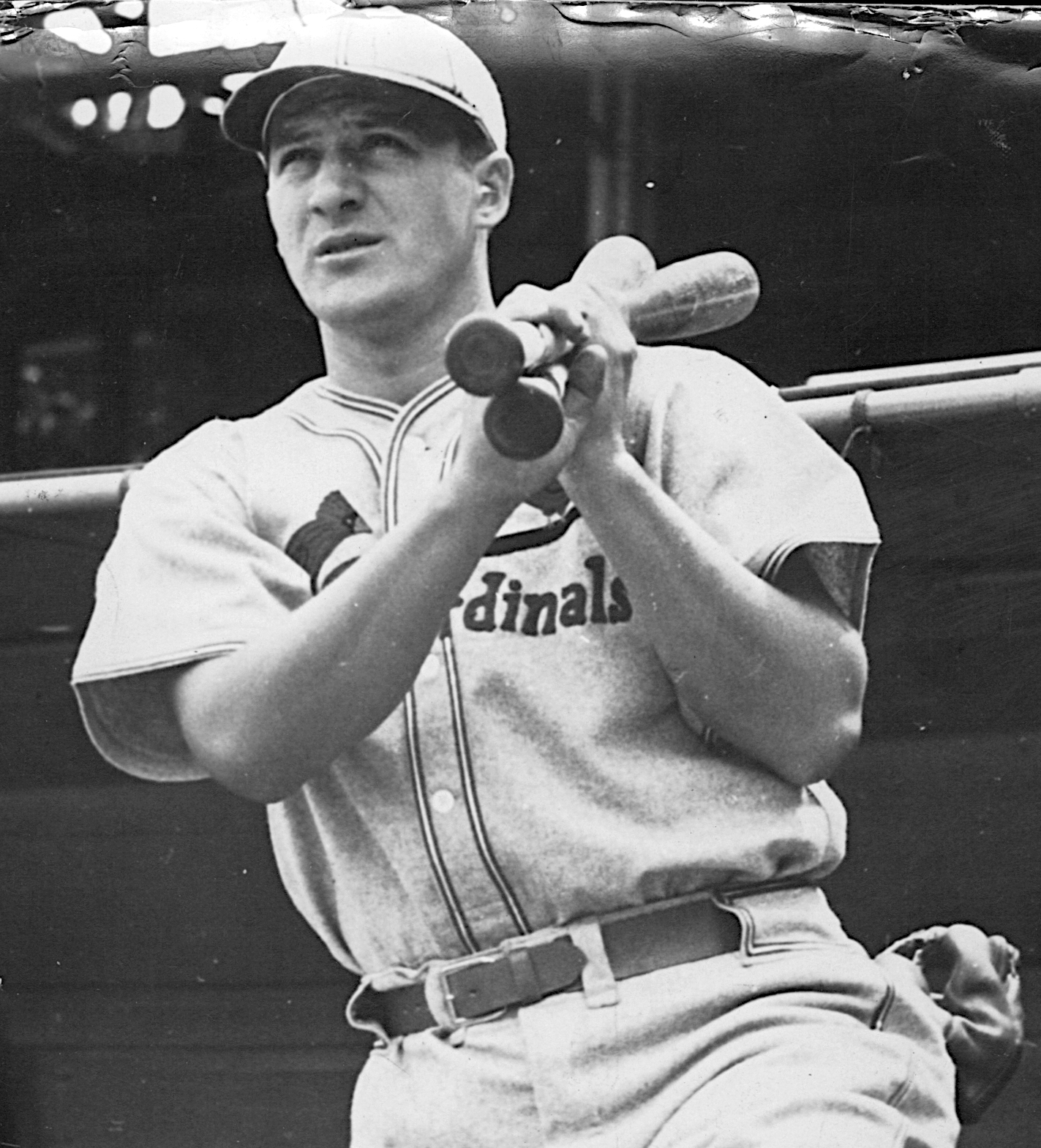
- Medwick with the St. Louis Cardinals, c. 1947
- Left fielder
- Born: November 24, 1911; Carteret, New Jersey, U.S.
- Died: March 21, 1975 (aged 63); St. Petersburg, Florida, U.S.
- Batted: Right Threw: Right

MLB debut
- September 2, 1932, for the St. Louis Cardinals

Last MLB appearance
- July 25, 1948, for the St. Louis Cardinals

MLB statistics
- Batting average: .324
- Hits: 2,471
- Home runs: 205
- Runs batted in: 1,383
- Stats at Baseball Reference

Teams
- St. Louis Cardinals (1932–1940); Brooklyn Dodgers (1940–1943); New York Giants (1943–1945); Boston Braves (1945); Brooklyn Dodgers (1946); St. Louis Cardinals (1947–1948)

Career highlights and awards
- 10× All-Star (1934–1942, 1944); World Series champion (1934); NL MVP (1937); Triple Crown (1937); NL batting champion (1937); NL home run leader (1937); 3× NL RBI leader (1936–1938); St. Louis Cardinals Hall of Fame

Member of the National

Baseball Hall of Fame
- Induction: 1968
- Vote: 84.8% (ninth ballot)

Joseph Michael Medwick (November 24, 1911 – March 21, 1975), nicknamed "Ducky", "Muscles", and "Mickey", was an American professional baseball left fielder. He played 17 major-league seasons from 1932 to 1948, all in the National League, for the St. Louis Cardinals, Brooklyn Dodgers, New York Giants, and Boston Braves. His playing days included the latter half of the Cardinals "Gashouse Gang" era and their 1934 World Series championship.

Medwick remains the most recent National League player to have won the Triple Crown award (1937). A ten-time All-Star, he was elected to the National Baseball Hall of Fame by the Baseball Writers' Association of America in 1968 with 84.81% of the votes. In 2014, he became a member of the inaugural class of the St. Louis Cardinals Hall of Fame.

== Early life ==
Medwick was born and raised in Carteret, New Jersey, the son of Hungarian immigrants. He excelled in baseball, basketball, football, and track at Carteret High School. Famed football coach Knute Rockne made arrangements for Medwick to play football at University of Notre Dame, but he chose professional baseball instead.

== Career ==
=== Early minor-league career (1930–1932) ===
Medwick entered professional baseball in 1930 with the Scottdale Scotties of the Middle Atlantic League. In 75 games he had a .419 batting average and 22 home runs. He spent most of the next two seasons with the Houston Buffaloes of the Texas League. He played 161 games for Houston in 1931, hitting .305 with 19 home runs. He played in 139 games for the team the next year, hitting .354 with 26 home runs before being called up to the major leagues.

=== St. Louis Cardinals (1932–1940) ===
He made his major-league debut with the Cardinals in 1932. By 1934, he hit .319 with 18 home runs and 106 runs batted in (RBIs). Though Medwick swung at any pitch near the strike zone, he was difficult to strike out. He became known as one of baseball's rising stars, but was competitive to the point of combativeness, and regarded by some as self-centered.

Medwick's hard-charging style of play got him pulled out of the seventh game of the 1934 World Series by Commissioner Kenesaw Mountain Landis after a hard slide into third baseman Marv Owen on a triple which caused Detroit Tigers fans to pelt Medwick with fruits and vegetables. Landis also ordered Owen benched. Medwick remains the only known player to be thrown out of a game for his own personal safety. When asked about the incident after the game, Medwick replied, "I knew why they threw them. What I don't understand is why they brought them to the ballpark in the first place."

Medwick won the National League Triple Crown and the National League Most Valuable Player Award in 1937, leading the league with a .374 batting average, 31 home runs, and 154 RBIs. He remains the last National League player to win a Triple Crown. He would have won its home run component outright, but a home run hit in a June 6 game that was later wiped out by forfeit left him tied with Mel Ott. Medwick also led the National League with 237 hits, 111 runs scored, 56 doubles, 406 total bases, and a .641 slugging percentage. Before his 26th birthday, Medwick had accumulated 1,101 hits, the 12th highest total for a 25-year-old player in MLB history.

Medwick's 64 doubles in 1936 remains the National League record. He also held the National League record with seven consecutive seasons with 40 or more doubles until Stan Musial topped it with nine.

=== Brooklyn Dodgers (1940–1943) ===
On June 12, 1940, the Cardinals traded Medwick and Curt Davis to the Brooklyn Dodgers for $125,000 and four lesser-known players. While still a solid hitter, Medwick never excelled defensively, where the Cardinals felt he was losing some of the skills he displayed in his 1937 Triple Crown season. Team president Branch Rickey and owner Sam Breadon also thought the trade would be best because they thought that Medwick was becoming increasingly discontented with being a Cardinal, having spent all season haggling with the pair over his contract.

In 1941, Medwick batted .318 in 133 games and helped Brooklyn win their first pennant since 1920. He batted .300 in 142 games in 1942, and had a .272 average through 48 games as of mid-July 1943, the end of his first stint with Brooklyn.

==== June 1940 beaning ====
Six days after joining the Dodgers, on June 18, 1940, Medwick was nearly killed by what some at the time regarded as a beanball thrown by former Cardinals teammate Bob Bowman. A mob of Dodgers led by their manager, Leo Durocher, charged the mound and had to be restrained from going after Bowman by the other Cardinals and the umpires. Uniformed members of the New York City Police Department sat with Bowman in the dugout to protect him from the crowd, and on request from Dodger president Larry MacPhail, nearly 100 were present by the end of the game.

William O'Dwyer, Brooklyn's district attorney, started an investigation to determine whether the hit by pitch was deliberate. Bowman blamed the incident on sign stealing by Dodgers coach Chuck Dressen. He said that Dressen would whistle each time he saw the sign for a curveball. Hearing the whistle, Medwick stepped toward what he thought was a curveball, but Bowman had decided to throw a high, inside fastball to confuse them. When Medwick strode forward, the ball hit him in the temple and rendered him unconscious. Medwick did not blame Bowman for the beaning, telling one of O'Dwyer's aides: "No direct threat had been made to me by Bowman. I saw the ball leave from his hand, but that was the last I saw of it."

National League president Ford Frick conducted his own investigation. Durocher and the Dodgers told him they still thought the hit by pitch was deliberate; Bowman countered that "I never meant to hurt Joe." On June 20, O'Dwyer's office dismissed the case for lack of evidence. The next day, Frick reached the same verdict.

Though contemporary baseball writers wondered if the beaning would affect Medwick's playing, baseball historian Frank Russo does not believe that it did, pointing to Medwick's strong statistics for the year—in 106 games with Brooklyn he hit .300, while in 143 total games for the season he had a .301 average.

=== Late major-league career (1943–1948) ===
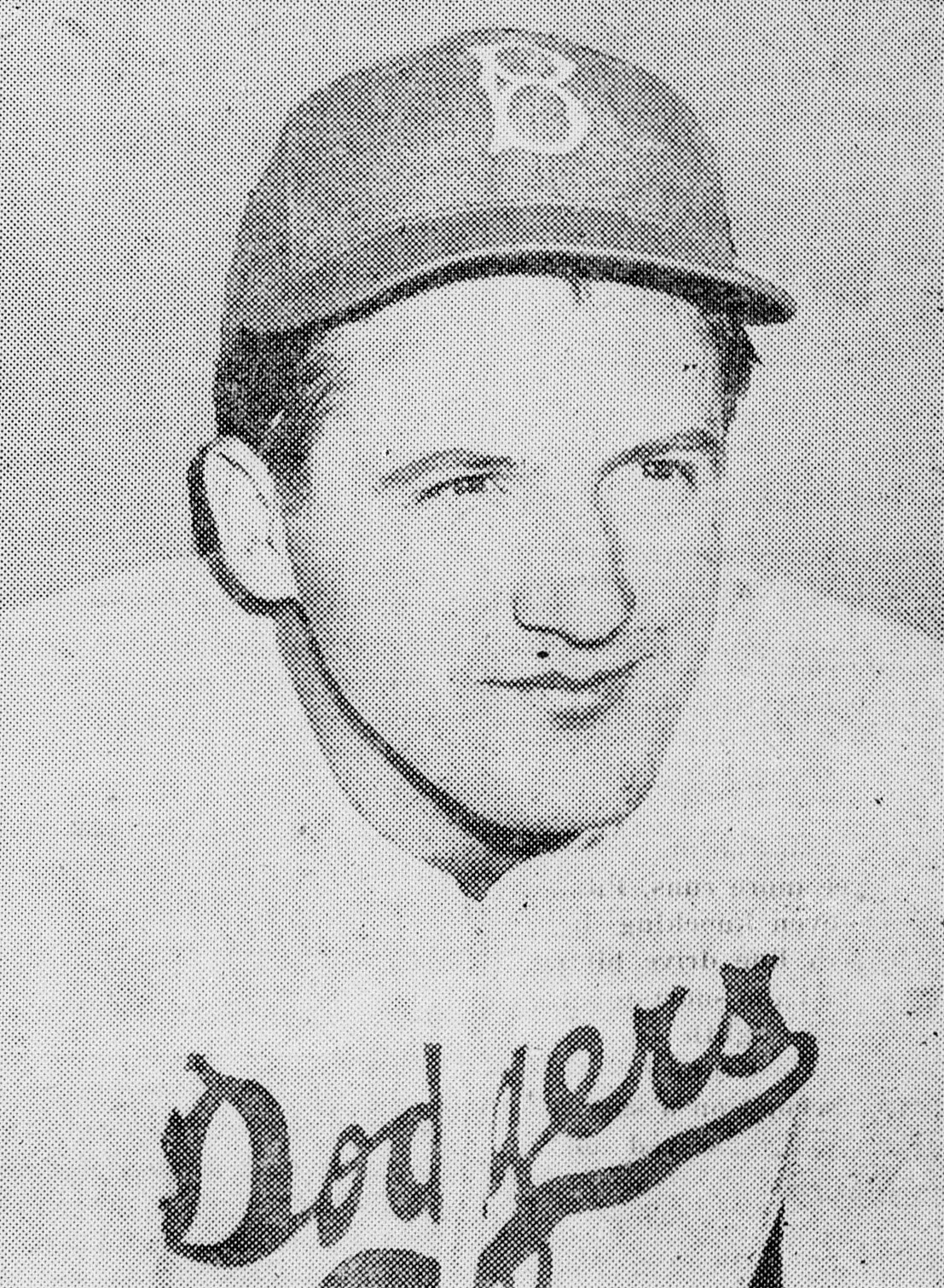
Medwick, circa 1943

Medwick was claimed off waivers by the New York Giants on July 16, 1943. During a USO tour by a number of players in 1944, Medwick was among several individuals given an audience by Pope Pius XII, who had been Cardinal Secretary of State before his elevation to the papacy. Upon being asked by the Pope what his vocation was, Medwick replied, "Your Holiness, I'm Joe Medwick. I, too, used to be a Cardinal."

On June 16, 1945, Medwick was traded from the Giants to the Boston Braves for catcher Clyde Kluttz. In 1946, Medwick was released by the Braves in February, then signed as a free agent by the St. Louis Browns, but coming out of spring training was unable to stick with the team and was seemingly out of baseball at age 34. He was signed by the Dodgers on June 25; he played in 41 games including the 1946 National League tie-breaker series. He returned to St. Louis to finish his career with the Cardinals in 1947 and 1948. As a major-league player, Medwick had a .324 batting average and was a ten-time All-Star over 17 seasons. Late in his career, Medwick said that golf was helping him to stay in good physical condition; 36 holes per day allowed him to walk more than 10 miles (16 km) "without heavy strain".

=== Late minor-league career (1948–1952) ===
Medwick stayed in the game for several seasons at the minor-league level. In 1948, he returned to the Houston Buffaloes and appeared in 35 games. In 1949, he was player-coach of the Miami Beach Flamingos, a Class 'B' team in the Florida International League. He had 375 at-bats in 106 games, with 121 hits for a .323 batting average. After sitting out the 1950 season, he played in 60 games in 1951 and 11 games in 1952 with Class 'B' Raleigh and Tampa, respectively.

== Career statistics ==
In 1984 games played over 17 major-league seasons, Medwick compiled a .324 batting average (2471-for-7635) with 1198 runs, 540 doubles, 113 triples, 205 home runs, 1383 RBI, 437 bases on balls, .362 on-base percentage and .505 slugging percentage. He recorded a career .980 fielding percentage.

In 12 World Series games (1934, 1941), he hit .326 (15-for-46) with five runs, five RBI, and one home run.

Medwick recorded two five-hit games and 49 four-hit games during his major-league career.

== Later life ==
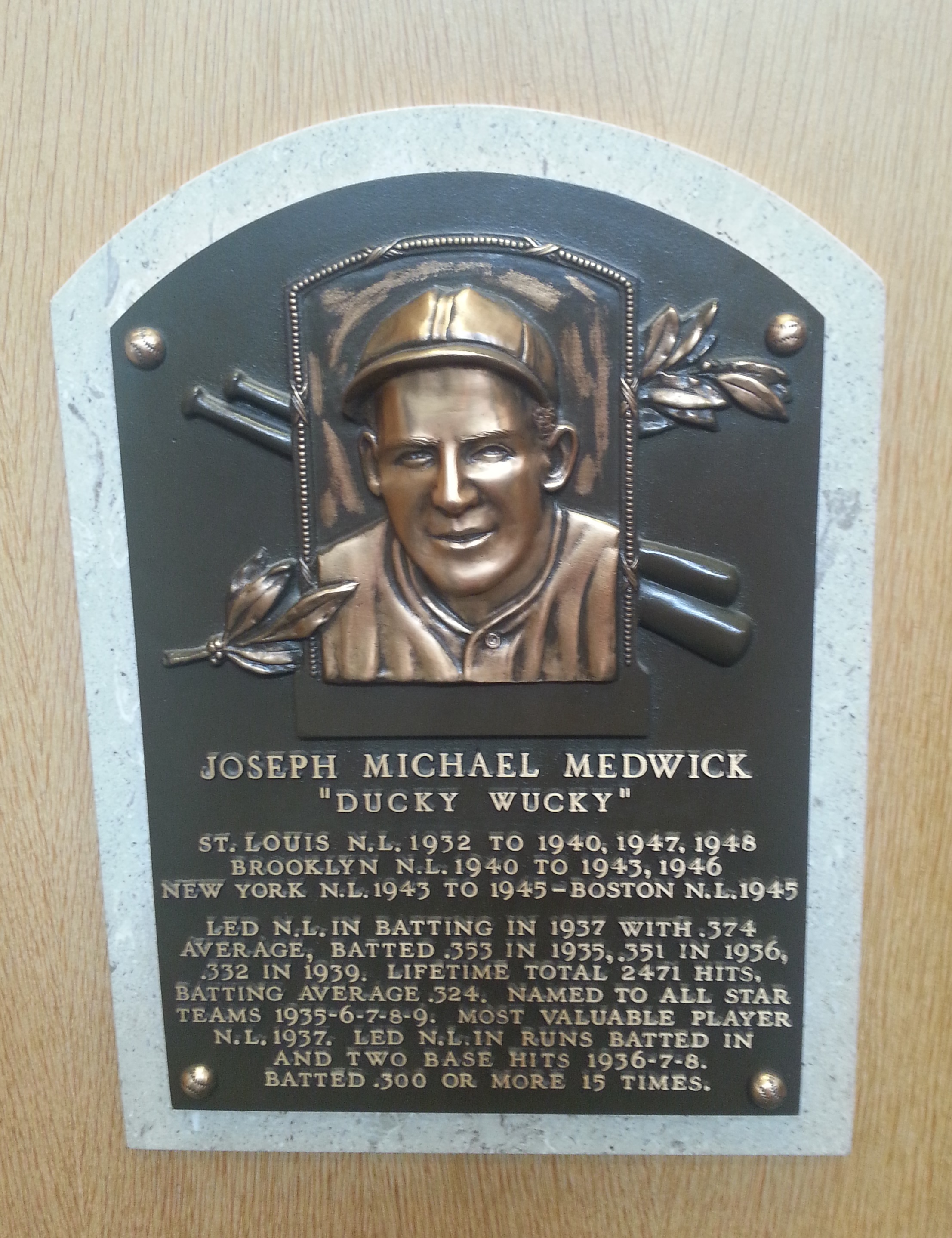
Plaque at the National Baseball Hall of Fame

In 1966, Medwick was hired as a hitting instructor in the Cardinals minor league system, a role he held until his death. During spring training in March 1975, Medwick died of a heart attack at age 63 in St. Petersburg, Florida. He was survived by his wife, and son, and a daughter; he was buried at St. Lucas Cemetery in Sunset Hills, Missouri, a suburb of St. Louis.

== Legacy ==
Medwick initially received a limited number of votes from members of the Baseball Writers' Association of America (BBWAA) in support of his election to the National Baseball Hall of Fame, possibly "caused by the antagonism felt toward him by many baseball writers, whom he often dismissed rudely when they approached him for interviews." In 1956, he appeared on 16.1% of the ballots, with 75% being the threshold for enshrinement; in 1962 he received 21.3%, and in 1964 he received 53.7%. After increasing to 61.9% in 1966, he fell just short in 1967 with 72.6%, until receiving 84.8% in 1968, his final year of eligibility. Following his election, which came 20 years after his final major-league season, he said, "This was the longest slump of my career. I had gone 0 for 20 before, but never 0 for 20 years."

In January 2014, the Cardinals announced Medwick among 22 former players and personnel to be inducted into the St. Louis Cardinals Hall of Fame for the inaugural class of 2014.

Joseph Medwick Park along the banks of the Rahway River in Woodbridge Township and Carteret in Middlesex County, New Jersey, is named in his honor.

== See also ==
- Major League Baseball Triple Crown
- List of Major League Baseball doubles records
- List of Major League Baseball career hits leaders
- List of Major League Baseball career doubles leaders
- List of Major League Baseball career triples leaders
- List of Major League Baseball career runs scored leaders
- List of Major League Baseball career runs batted in leaders
- List of Major League Baseball players to hit for the cycle
- List of Major League Baseball batting champions
- List of Major League Baseball annual home run leaders
- List of Major League Baseball annual runs batted in leaders
- List of Major League Baseball annual runs scored leaders
- List of Major League Baseball annual doubles leaders
- List of Major League Baseball annual triples leaders
- List of St. Louis Cardinals team records

Achievements
Preceded by Moose Solters	Hitting for the cycle June 29, 1935	Succeeded by Sam Leslie
