= 1968 Baseball Hall of Fame balloting =

Elections to the Baseball Hall of Fame

National Baseball

Hall of Fame and Museum
- New inductees: 3
- via BBWAA: 1
- via Veterans Committee: 2
- Total inductees: 110
- Induction date: July 22, 1968

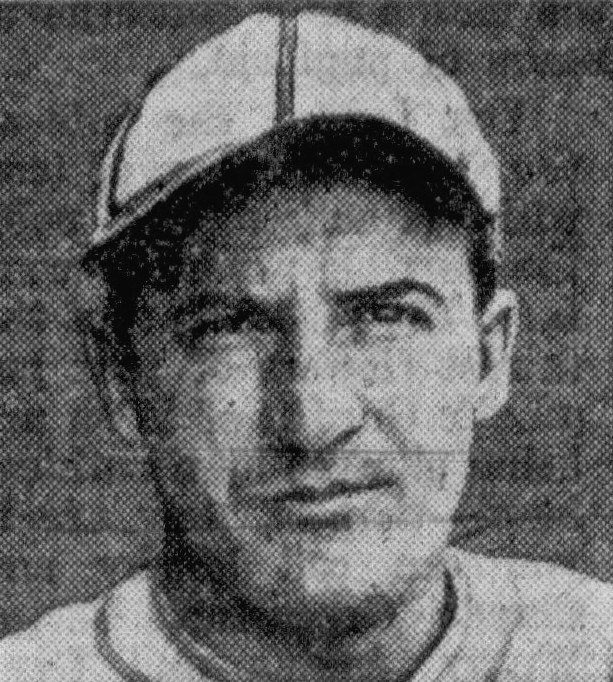
1968 BBWAA inductee Joe Medwick

Elections to the Baseball Hall of Fame for 1968 followed rules revised in June 1967, which returned the Baseball Writers' Association of America (BBWAA) to annual elections without any provision for a runoff. In the event, the BBWAA voted once by mail to select from recent major league players, and elected Joe Medwick. The Veterans Committee met in closed sessions to consider executives, managers, umpires, and earlier major league players. It selected two players, Kiki Cuyler and Goose Goslin. A formal induction ceremony was held in Cooperstown, New York, on July 22, 1968, with Commissioner of Baseball William Eckert presiding.

== BBWAA election ==
The BBWAA was authorized to elect players active in 1948 or later, but not after 1962; the ballot included candidates from the 1967 ballot who received at least 5% of the vote but were not elected, along with selected players, chosen by a screening committee, whose last appearance was in 1962. All 10-year members of the BBWAA were eligible to vote.

Voters were instructed to cast votes for up to 10 candidates; any candidate receiving votes on at least 75% of the ballots would be honored with induction to the Hall. The ballot consisted of 48 players; a total of 283 ballots were cast, with 213 votes required for election. A total of 2,109 individual votes were cast, an average of 7.45 per ballot. Candidates who were eligible for the first time are indicated here with a dagger (†). The one candidate who received at least 75% of the vote and was elected is indicated in bold italics; candidates who have since been elected in subsequent elections are indicated in italics.

Joe Medwick, Arky Vaughan, Terry Moore, Frankie Crosetti and Frank McCormick were on the ballot for the final time.

Player	Votes	Percent	Change
**Joe Medwick**	240	84.8	▲12.2%
Roy Campanella	205	72.4	▲2.5%
Lou Boudreau	146	51.6	▲2.6%
Enos Slaughter	129	45.6	▲3.5%
Ralph Kiner	118	41.7	▼0.8%
Johnny Mize	103	36.4	▲5.9%
Allie Reynolds	95	33.6	▲7.2%
Marty Marion	89	31.4	▲0.6%
Arky Vaughan	82	29.0	▲13.2%
Pee Wee Reese	81	28.6	▼1.9%
Johnny Vander Meer	79	27.9	▼1.9%
Joe Gordon	77	27.2	▲4.6%
Phil Rizzuto	74	26.1	▲1.8%
Hal Newhouser	67	23.7	▲2.5%
Bucky Walters	67	23.7	▲1.4%
Bobby Doerr	48	17.0	▲5.0%
George Kell	47	16.6	▲2.9%
Bob Lemon	47	16.6	▲4.6%
Alvin Dark	36	12.7	▼0.3%
Terry Moore	33	11.7	▲10.7%
Phil Cavarretta	23	8.1	▲3.0%
Tommy Henrich	22	7.8	-
Bobo Newsom	22	7.8	▲1.3%
Mickey Vernon	22	7.8	▲3.0%
Frankie Crosetti	15	5.3	Steady
Ted Kluszewski	14	4.9	▲1.8%
Bobby Thomson	13	4.6	▲1.2%
Charlie Keller	11	3.9	-
Sal Maglie	11	3.9	-
Carl Erskine	9	3.2	-
Don Newcombe	9	3.2	▼3.0%
Walker Cooper†	8	2.8	-
Dom DiMaggio	8	2.8	-
Johnny Sain	7	2.5	-
Richie Ashburn†	6	2.1	-
Schoolboy Rowe	6	2.1	-
Dixie Walker	6	2.1	-
Ewell Blackwell†	5	1.8	-
Dutch Leonard	5	1.8	-
Gil McDougald	4	1.4	Steady
Wally Moses	4	1.4	-
Harry Brecheen	3	1.1	-
Jackie Jensen	3	1.1	▲0.1%
Frank McCormick	3	1.1	-
Augie Galan†	2	0.7	-
Ed Lopat†	2	0.7	-
Preacher Roe	2	0.7	-
Vic Raschi	1	0.4	-

Key to colors
Elected to the Hall. These individuals are also indicated in **bold italics**.
Players who were elected in future elections. These individuals are also indicated in plain italics.
Players not yet elected who returned on the 1969 ballot.
Eliminated from future BBWAA voting. These individuals remain eligible for future Veterans Committee consideration.

Players eligible for the first time who were not included on the ballot were: Reno Bertoia, Steve Bilko, Jim Busby, Andy Carey, Bob Cerv, Harry Chiti, Billy Consolo, Dick Gernert, Joe Ginsberg, Billy Goodman, Granny Hamner, Clem Labine, Turk Lown, Hal Naragon, Bob Nieman, Danny O'Connell, Dave Philley, Sammy White, Gene Woodling, and Eddie Yost

== J. G. Taylor Spink Award ==
Damon Runyon (1880–1946) received the J. G. Taylor Spink Award honoring a baseball writer. The award was voted at the December 1967 meeting of the BBWAA, and included in the summer 1968 ceremonies.
