= Elden Auker =

American baseball player (1910–2006)

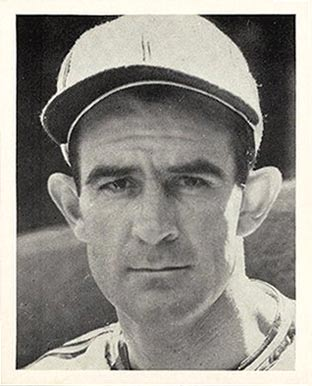
- Auker in 1941
- Pitcher
- Born: September 21, 1910; Norcatur, Kansas, U.S.
- Died: August 4, 2006 (aged 95); Vero Beach, Florida, U.S.
- Batted: Right Threw: Right

MLB debut
- August 10, 1933, for the Detroit Tigers

Last MLB appearance
- September 20, 1942, for the St. Louis Browns

MLB statistics
- Win–loss record: 130–101
- Earned run average: 4.42
- Strikeouts: 594
- Stats at Baseball Reference

Teams
- Detroit Tigers (1933–1938); Boston Red Sox (1939); St. Louis Browns (1940–1942)

Career highlights and awards
- World Series champion (1935)

Elden LeRoy "Submarine" Auker (September 21, 1910 – August 4, 2006) was an American Major League Baseball pitcher with the Detroit Tigers, Boston Red Sox and St. Louis Browns between 1933 and 1942. Auker batted and threw right-handed. Auker was noted for his submarine pitching style.

== Athletic career ==
Auker was born and raised in Norcatur, Kansas, the son of Fred and Florence Auker. He attended college at Kansas State University in Manhattan, where he was a brother of Phi Sigma Kappa. Called by former Kansas State University President James McCain, "the greatest all-around athlete in Kansas State history," Auker won nine varsity letters – three each in baseball, basketball and football – during his college career, from 1929 to 1932. He was first-team All-American in baseball and All-Big Six Conference in baseball, football, and basketball. In football, Auker starred at quarterback, was named second team All-American by Grantland Rice and was offered a $6,000 contract by the Chicago Bears. The Bears sent Bronko Nagurski to Manhattan to try to convince him to join the team. Auker turned down the Bears, however, to pitch for the Detroit Tigers.

During his ten-year Major League career, Auker played with the Tigers, Boston Red Sox and St. Louis Browns. While with Detroit, Auker went to consecutive World Series, in 1934 and 1935. In the 1934 Series against the St. Louis Cardinals, Auker was the winning pitcher in Game 4, but the loser to Dizzy Dean in the decisive Game 7. The next season, Auker led the American League in winning percentage with an 18–7 record. In the 1935 Series against the Chicago Cubs, Auker started Game 3, which Detroit won in extra innings, and the Tigers went on to win the Series four games to two.

During the 1935 World Series, Auker was interviewed by a young Cubs broadcaster, Ronald Reagan. When they met after Reagan had been elected governor of California, Reagan told him, "You probably won't remember me, but I'll remember you as long as I live." The radio interview, Reagan said, "was my first big break."

Before the 1939 season, Auker was traded by Detroit to the Red Sox for Pinky Higgins and Archie McKain. That season was Ted Williams's rookie year in Boston, and the two would develop what became a lifelong friendship during the season. However, Auker chafed playing under Red Sox manager Joe Cronin, and his 9–10 record in the year was the lowest win total of any full season he played. Auker finished his career playing three seasons with the Browns (1940–1942). During the 1941 season, he gave up hits to Joe DiMaggio during two games of DiMaggio's record 56-game hitting streak.

As a hitter, Auker was a better than average hitting pitcher, posting a .187 batting average (131-for-700) with 73 runs, 6 home runs, 72 RBI and 41 bases on balls. Defensively, he was better than average, recording a .967 fielding percentage which was 12 points higher than the league average at his position.

== Post-playing career ==
Auker retired in 1943 so that he could contribute to the war effort. From 1943 to 1945, he worked on airplane and naval guns. From 1946 until 1975, Auker worked for Bay State Abrasives in Massachusetts, a company that made armaments and abrasive materials, retiring as the company president.

He was inducted into the Kansas Sports Hall of Fame in 1969.

Auker appeared at the last game played at Tiger Stadium on September 27, 1999. Auker spoke at the ceremony and told the crowd: "Never forget us, for we live on by those that carry on the Tiger tradition and who so proudly wear the olde English D."

In 2001, Auker published his memoirs, entitled Sleeper Cars and Flannel Uniforms, written with Tom Keegan.

He died due to congestive heart failure, at age 95, in his home in Vero Beach, Florida. He was the last surviving member of the 1935 World Champion Detroit Tigers.

== Works ==
- Auker, Elden; Keegan, Tom (2001). Sleeper Cars and Flannel Uniforms: A Lifetime of Memories from Striking Out the Babe to Teeing It Up with the President. Triumph Books. ISBN 1892049252.
