= Paul Dean (baseball) =

American baseball player (1912–1981)

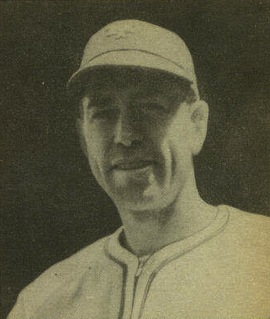
- Dean on a 1940 Bowman Gum card
- Pitcher
- Born: August 14, 1912; Lucas, Arkansas, U.S.
- Died: March 17, 1981 (aged 68); Springdale, Arkansas, U.S.
- Batted: Right Threw: Right

MLB debut
- April 18, 1934, for the St. Louis Cardinals

Last MLB appearance
- May 31, 1943, for the St. Louis Browns

MLB statistics
- Win–loss record: 50–34
- Earned run average: 3.72
- Strikeouts: 387
- Stats at Baseball Reference

Teams
- St. Louis Cardinals (1934–1939); New York Giants (1940–1941); St. Louis Browns (1943)

Career highlights and awards
- World Series champion (1934); Pitched a no-hitter on September 21, 1934

Paul Dee Dean (August 14, 1912 – March 17, 1981), nicknamed "Daffy", was an American Major League Baseball right-handed pitcher. Born in Lucas, Arkansas, he pitched for the St. Louis Cardinals (1934–1939), the New York Giants (1940–1941), and the St. Louis Browns (1943).

== Career ==
Dean played several years of baseball alongside his better-known brother, Jay. Because of his brother's nickname, "Dizzy", Dean also had a nickname, Daffy, but this did not reflect his personality as he was considered quiet and serious. The nickname was mainly a creation of the press.

During his rookie season (at the age of 22), Dean pitched a no-hitter on September 21, 1934, in the second game of a doubleheader against the Brooklyn Dodgers. Dizzy (who had pitched a three-hit shutout in the first game) would say afterwards: "Shoot! If I'da known Paul was gonna pitch a no-hitter, I'da pitched me one, too." Paul finished the year with a 19–11 record to help St. Louis win the National League pennant. Combined with his brother becoming the only NL pitcher in the live-ball era to win 30 games, the brothers bettered Dizzy's prediction that "me 'n' Paul are gonna win 45 games" by four wins. In the World Series, his brother and he won two games apiece, combining for a 4–1 record, 28 strikeouts, and a 1.43 ERA, as the Cardinals took the series against the Detroit Tigers in seven games.

The following year, Dean won 19 games again. He was injured, however, and pitched ineffectively for the rest of his career.

Dean is featured prominently in some versions of Abbott & Costello's "Who's on First?" comedy sketch. In the sketch, Abbott is explaining to Costello that many ballplayers have unusual nicknames, including Dizzy Dean, his brother Daffy Dean, and their "French cousin Goo-fay Dean". The fictitious French cousin's name is goofy pronounced with an exaggerated French accent.

Dean served in the United States Army during World War II.

Dean died at age 68 in Springdale, Arkansas, from a heart attack.

In the 1952 biographical film about Dizzy Dean, The Pride of St Louis, Paul was portrayed by actor Richard Crenna.

== See also ==
- List of Major League Baseball no-hitters

Achievements
Preceded by Bobby Burke	No-hitter pitcher September 21, 1934	Succeeded by Vern Kennedy
