= Goose Goslin =

American baseball player (1900–1971)

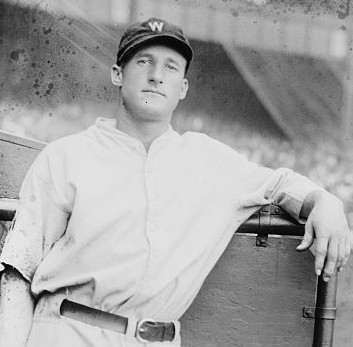
- Goslin in 1924
- Left fielder
- Born: October 16, 1900; Salem, New Jersey, U.S.
- Died: May 15, 1971 (aged 70); Bridgeton, New Jersey, U.S.
- Batted: Left Threw: Right

MLB debut
- September 16, 1921, for the Washington Senators

Last MLB appearance
- September 25, 1938, for the Washington Senators

MLB statistics
- Batting average: .316
- Hits: 2,735
- Home runs: 248
- Runs batted in: 1,612
- Stats at Baseball Reference

Teams
- Washington Senators (1921–1930); St. Louis Browns (1930–1932); Washington Senators (1933); Detroit Tigers (1934–1937); Washington Senators (1938)

Career highlights and awards
- All-Star (1936); 2× World Series champion (1924, 1935); AL batting champion (1928); AL RBI leader (1924); Washington Nationals Ring of Honor

Member of the National

Baseball Hall of Fame
- Induction: 1968
- Election method: Veterans Committee

Leon Allen "Goose" Goslin (October 16, 1900 – May 15, 1971) was an American professional baseball left fielder. He played in Major League Baseball (MLB) for the Washington Senators, St. Louis Browns, and Detroit Tigers, from 1921 until 1938.

Goslin led the American League (AL) in triples two times and finished the season with a batting average of over .300 eleven times. He won the AL batting title in 1928 with a .379 batting average which set a Washington Senators record. He led the AL in assists five times, putouts four times and his 4,141 putouts and 181 assists as a left fielder are both 5th all time. His 173 triples are 22nd all time and his .316 batting average is 7th all time among left fielders with over 2,000 games played. A two time World Series winner, he was elected to the National Baseball Hall of Fame in 1968 via the Veterans Committee.

== Early years ==
Born in Salem, New Jersey, in 1900. He grew up on his family's 500-acre (200 ha) dairy farm near Fort Mott. Goslin had responsibility for milking cows in the mornings and evenings. As his baseball skills became apparent, initially as a pitcher, he took a part-time job with DuPont on the condition that he also play for the company's baseball team.

== Professional baseball ==
=== Minor leagues (1920–1921) ===
Goslin began his professional baseball career in 1920 at age 19 as a pitcher with the Columbia Comers of the South Atlantic League. During the 1920 season, he compiled a 6-5 record with a 2.44 earned run average. He also played in the outfield and compiled a .317 batting average and a .461 slugging percentage. He returned to Columbia in 1921, appearing in 142 games with a .390 batting average, .594 slugging percentage, and 67 extra-base hits.

Goslin was discovered by famed scout Joe Engel. After hearing from Engel, Washington Senators owner Clark Griffith personally scouted Goslin and attended a game in Columbia, South Carolina. A fly ball hit Goslin on the head, and another barely missed him. Goslin hit three home runs in the game, and Griffith decided to take a chance on him.

=== "Goose" ===
Goslin's difficulty in judging fly balls contributed to his nickname "Goose." Opposing players said Goslin resembled a bird flapping its wings when he ran after a ball with his arms waving. While not a great fielder, Goslin did have a good throwing arm, leading the American League in assists by an outfielder in 1924 and 1925. However, one year during spring training, Goslin wandered to an adjacent field where a track and field team was working out. Goslin tried the shot put, and his throwing arm was never the same afterward.

=== Washington Senators (1921–1930) ===
The 20-year-old Goslin was called up to the major leagues to play for the Washington Senators for the last two weeks of the 1921 season. He had a promising .351 on-base percentage in 14 games in 1921 and became a starter for the Senators in 1922. Goslin played 93 games in 1922 and became a fixture for the Senators in left field until 1930. Goslin hit .324 in his first full season in 1922, followed by a .300 season in 1923 with 99 runs batted in (RBIs). Showing speed on the base paths, Goslin led the American League with 18 triples in 1923.

In 1924, Goslin established himself as one of the league's top run producers, as he led the American League with 129 RBIs and finished seventh in batting average (.344). At age 23, Goslin also hit for the cycle and was among the league leaders with 17 triples (second best), 299 total bases (fourth best) and 199 hits (fifth best). After the Senators had losing records in 1922 and 1923, Goslin helped to spark the team to a 92-win season and their first World Series championship in 1924. With a 36-year-old Walter Johnson contributing 23 wins and the young Goslin knocking in 129 runs (50 more RBI than any other player on the team), the Senators finished two games ahead of the Yankees and defeated the New York Giants in the 1924 World Series. Goslin hit .344 with three home runs, seven RBI and a .656 slugging percentage in that World Series. Goslin also set a World Series record in 1924 with six consecutive hits, spread across three games (3-5). That record was tied in 1976 by Thurman Munson and later broken in 1990 by Billy Hatcher, who had seven consecutive hits in that World Series.

Goslin contributed another strong performance to the 1925 Senators, batting .334, with 72 extra base hits and 113 RBI. His 20 triples led the American League. Once again, he batted in far more runs than any other Senators hitter – 26 more than Sam Rice. The Senators easily won their second consecutive pennant, finishing 8 1/2 games ahead of the Philadelphia Athletics. Despite Goslin's three home runs, six RBI and a .692 slugging percentage in the 1925 World Series, the Senators were defeated in seven games by a Pittsburgh Pirates team led by Pie Traynor, Kiki Cuyler and Max Carey after having taken a 3–1 lead earlier in the series.

The American League Most Valuable Player award for 1924 and 1925 went to Goslin's teammates Walter Johnson and Roger Peckinpaugh.

Goslin continued as one of the American League's best hitters with averages of .354 and .334 in 1926 and 1927, but his best season came in 1928. That year, he won the American League batting crown with a career-high .379 batting average. He also finished among the league leaders with a .442 on-base percentage (third best in the league), a .614 slugging percentage (third best), 17 home runs (third best) and 63 extra base hits (fourth best).

The 1928 batting title was not decided until the last day of the season. Goslin and Heinie Manush of the St. Louis Browns were tied going into the final game, and the Senators and Browns played each other in the final game. Goslin was leading Manush when his turn came to bat in the ninth inning. If Goslin made an out, he would lose the batting crown. In Lawrence Ritter's 1966 oral history, "The Glory of Their Times", Goslin described the events that followed. Manager Bucky Harris left the decision to Goslin on whether to bat or sit. Goslin decided to sit and take the batting crown, but his teammates (particularly Joe Judge) goaded him that he would appear yellow if he didn't bat. Goslin was persuaded to bat and promptly took two strikes. At that point, Goslin recalled that he unsuccessfully tried to get ejected from the game, as the at bat would then disappear. Goslin began berating the home plate umpire about the strike calls, only to have the umpire tell him that he was not going to get ejected, and wasn't going to get a walk, so he better step back up and swing. Goslin ended up with what he called a "lucky hit" to beat Manush by a fraction of a point.

=== St. Louis Browns (1930–1932) ===
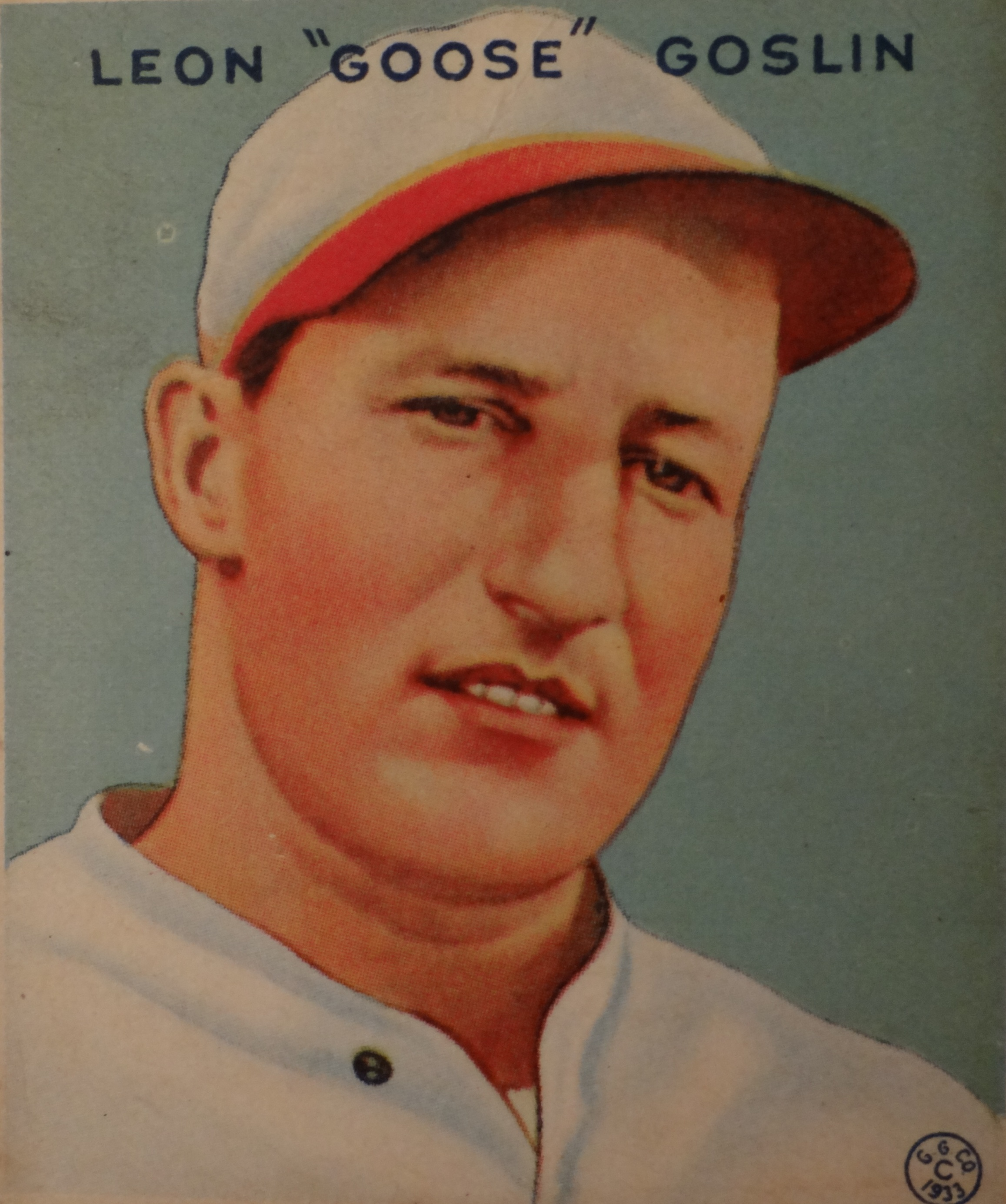
Goslin 1933 Goudey card.

On June 13, 1930, Washington traded Goslin to the St. Louis Browns in exchange for Alvin Crowder and Heinie Manush. Goslin batted .326 with a career-high .652 slugging percentage for the Browns in 1930. In 101 games for the Browns, Goslin had 30 home runs, 100 RBI, and 62 extra-base hits. Goslin had another solid year for the Browns in 1931, batting .328 with a career-high 42 doubles, 76 extra base hits and 105 RBI.

While Goslin's average slipped to .299 in 1932, he still drove in 104 runs for the Browns. On Opening Day, April 12, Goslin came up to the plate against the Chicago White Sox with a bat that featured 12 longitudinal green stripes. The bat was thrown out of the game, and on the following day, American League President William Harridge declared the "zebra bat" illegal, as it caused a distraction to the fielding team.

=== Washington Senators (1933) ===
On December 14, 1932, Goslin was traded back to the Senators. Goslin led the Senators back to the 1933 World Series. The Senators played in only three World Series in their history, and Goslin played for the Senators in every game of those Series. However, Goslin did not have his usual power in 1933. His 64 RBIs and .452 slugging percentage were Goslin's lowest numbers since his rookie season.

=== Detroit Tigers (1934–1937) ===
In December 1933, the Senators traded Goslin to the Detroit Tigers for John Stone. Goslin later recounted that owner Clark Griffith told him that he simply couldn't afford to pay him. Even though the Senators had made it to the World Series, the team was not making money. In Detroit, Goslin joined Charlie Gehringer and Hank Greenberg with the trio being known as Detroit's "G-Men". Goslin appeared in 151 games for the 1934 Tigers, including 145 as the team's starting left fielder. He ranked 14th in the American League most valuable player voting with a .305 batting average, 100 RBIs, 106 runs scored, and 38 doubles. He helped the team win the American League pennant with a 101–53 record.

Goslin had another strong season in 1935, tallying 111 RBIs, 87 runs scored, 56 bases on balls and 34 doubles. He helped the Tigers win their second consecutive American League pennant. In the 1935 World Series, he compiled a .407 on-base percentage. In the final game, Goslin came to bat with two outs with the score tied in the bottom of the ninth inning; he had a walk-off single to drive in the game-winning run.

In 1936, Goslin had his best season in Detroit, compiling a .315 batting average, .403 on-base percentage, 66 extra-base hits, 125 RBIs, and 122 runs scored. He was also selected for the first time in his career to the American League All-Star team. On July 28, 1936, Goslin hit one of the most unusual home runs in baseball history. Goslin drove the ball into the gap between right and center field. Joe DiMaggio and Myril Hoag collided in the outfield and were both knocked unconscious for several minutes. Goslin rounded the bases with an inside-the-park home run.

In 1937, Goslin's batting average plummeted by 77 points to .238—the lowest average of his career to date. He also lost his spot as the Tigers' regular left fielder, starting only 39 games at the position. On October 3, 1937, five days after Goslin's father died, he was unconditionally released by the Tigers.

=== Washington Senators (1938) ===
After his release by the Tigers, Goslin later recounted (in "The Glory of Their Times") that he received a call from his old boss, Clark Griffith, asking him if he would be interested in ending his career back where it began in Washington. Goslin accepted the offer but batted only .158 in 38 games for the Senators during the 1938 season.

=== Career statistics ===
Goslin finished his career after 18 major league seasons with a .316 batting average, a .500 slugging percentage, 2,735 hits, 1,612 RBIs, 500 doubles and 173 triples. He had 11 seasons with at least 100 RBI, and his league leadership in RBIs in 1924 deprived Babe Ruth of the triple crown. He hit .300 or better in 11 seasons. He also hit three home runs in a game three times and had five hits in a game five times, along with 40 four-hit games.

Goslin holds the record for career home runs at the first Yankee Stadium by a visiting player, with 32.

== Later years ==
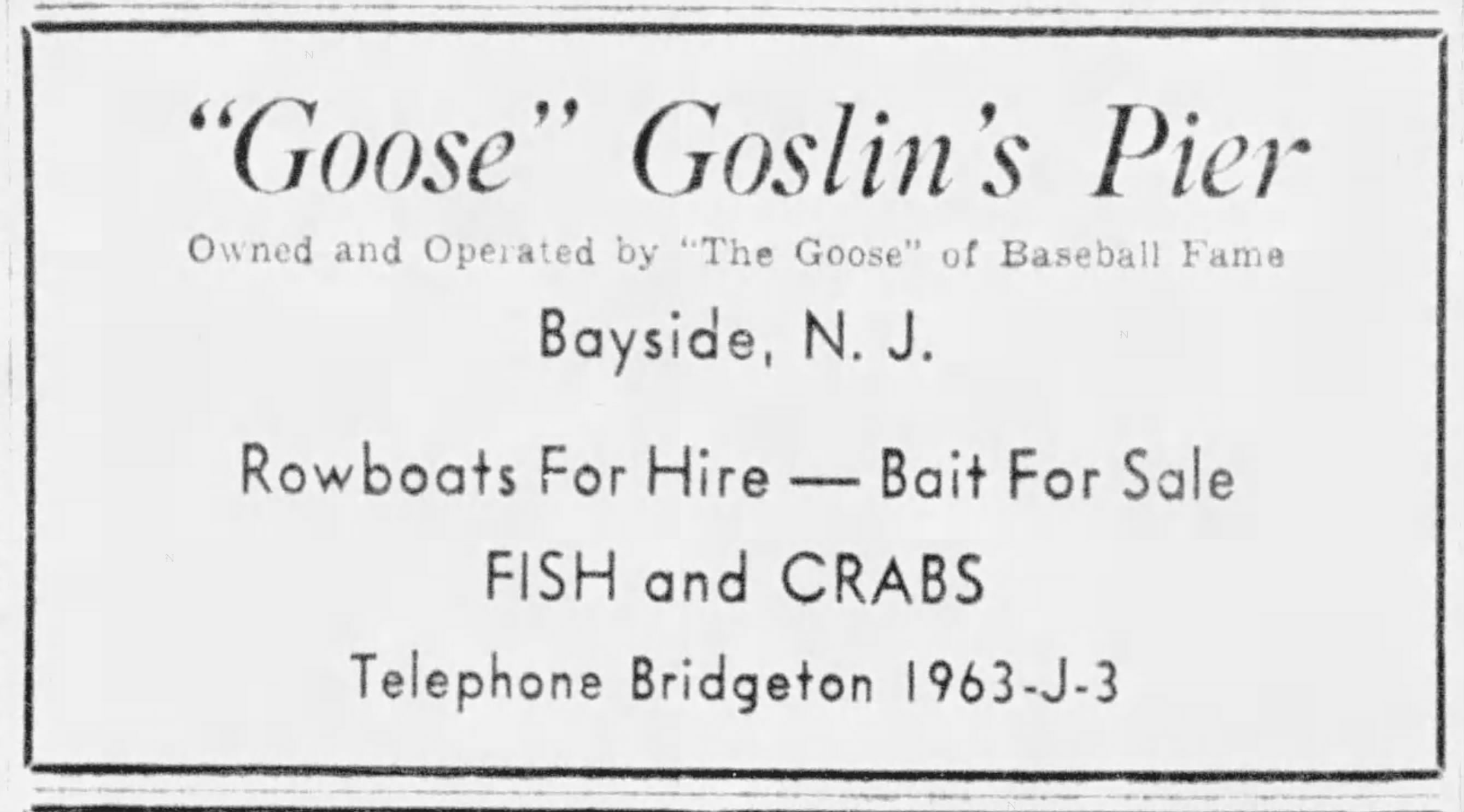
Add for Goslin's fishing camp, 1950

In April 1939, Goslin became a player-manager for the Trenton Senators of the Interstate League. He remained manager at Trenton until August 1941.

Goslin married Marion Wallace in Philadelphia in 1940. They lived in Glassboro, New Jersey. They had no children. His wife died in January 1959 after a long illness.

Goslin was a lifelong resident of South Jersey. He owned a big house in Glassboro, New Jersey, for many years, but he sold it after his wife died. In the early 1940s, he also purchased over 60 acres of meadowland in Bayside, Greenwich Township, along Stow Creek. The property included a dozen buildings, over 40 boats, a restaurant, and a sundeck with tables and chairs. Goslin spent his summers on the property during his marriage and later lived on the property, renting boats, fishing tackle, and cabins and selling fish, crabs, and lunches. At one point, he shipped 100 bushels or more each day from the property.

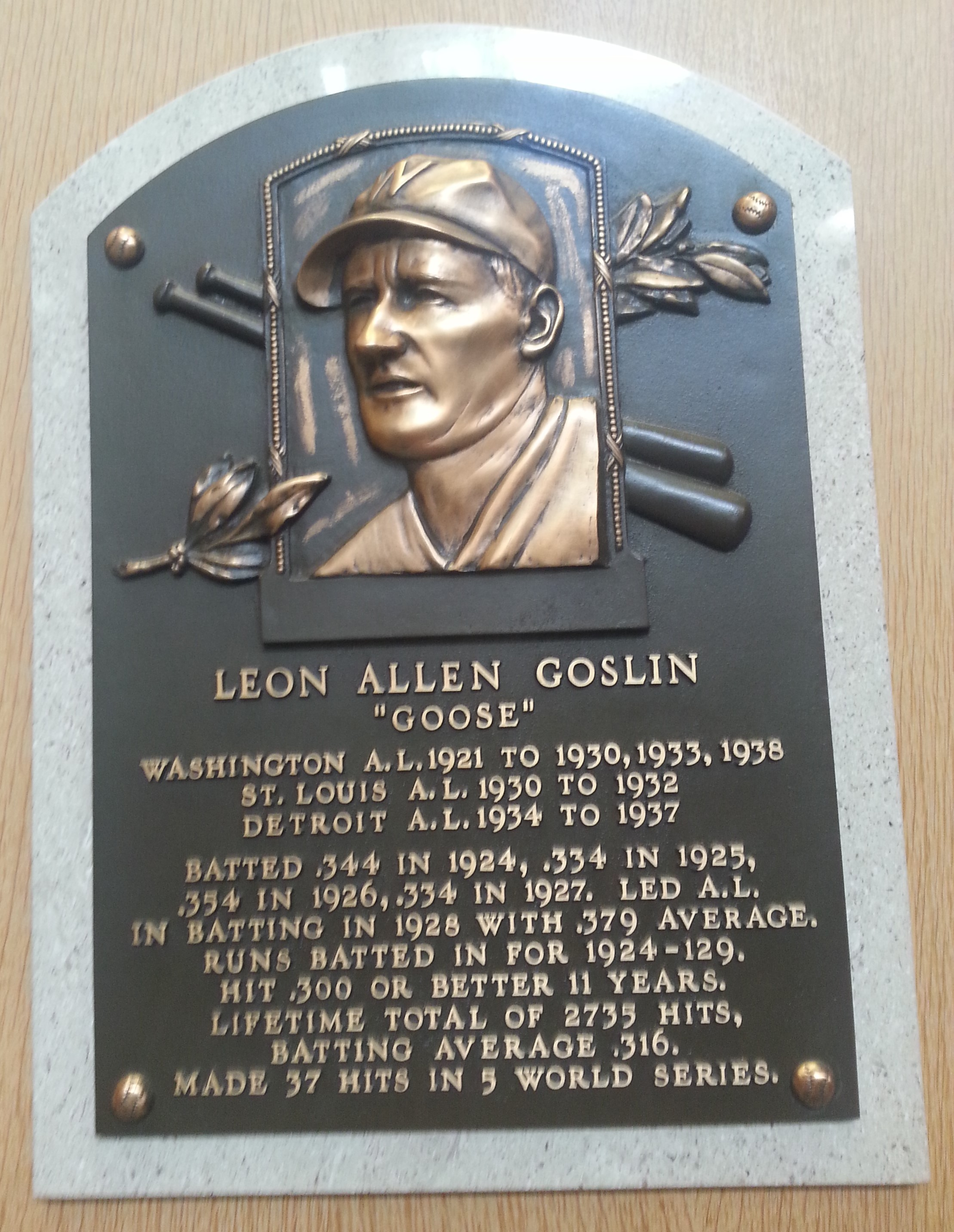
Goslin's plaque at the Baseball Hall of Fame

Goslin was elected to the Baseball Hall of Fame in 1968 by the Veterans Committee. At the induction ceremony in July 1968, Goslin became overwhelmed by emotion and said: "I have been lucky. I want to thank God, who gave me the health and strength to compete with these great players. I will never forget this. I will take this to my grave."

Goslin retired from his boat rental business in 1969 after his health declined. He was hospitalized in January 1969 for treatment of burns to his abdomen, after his couch caught fire when he fell asleep while smoking. He also had his larynx removed in July 1970. In May 1971, Goslin died at Bridgetown Hospital in Bridgeton, New Jersey, at age 70 and was buried in the Salem Baptist Cemetery in Salem, New Jersey.

== Honors and legacy ==
In 1999, Goslin ranked number 89 on The Sporting News list of Baseball's Greatest Players, and was nominated as a finalist for the Major League Baseball All-Century Team. Goslin ranked #6 on the Sports Illustrated list of The 50 Greatest New Jersey Sports Figures.

The South Jersey chapter of the Society for American Baseball Research, located in Cherry Hill, New Jersey, is named after Goslin.

== See also ==
- 1935 Detroit Tigers season
- List of Major League Baseball career home run leaders
- List of Major League Baseball career hits leaders
- List of Major League Baseball career doubles leaders
- List of Major League Baseball career triples leaders
- List of Major League Baseball career runs scored leaders
- List of Major League Baseball career runs batted in leaders
- List of Major League Baseball career total bases leaders
- List of Major League Baseball players to hit for the cycle
- List of Major League Baseball annual runs batted in leaders
- List of Major League Baseball batting champions
- List of Major League Baseball annual triples leaders
- List of Major League Baseball triples records
- List of Major League Baseball career stolen bases leaders

Awards and achievements
Preceded by Baby Doll Jacobson	Hitting for the cycle August 28, 1924	Succeeded by Kiki Cuyler
